= Psychic TV discography =

The discography of the experimental music group Psychic TV consists of over 100 full-length albums, over 15 compilation albums and over 30 singles and EPs.

== Studio albums ==
- Force the Hand of Chance (LP, cassette) (1982)
- Themes (LP) (1982)
- Dreams Less Sweet (LP, cassette) (1983)
- Pagan Day (LP, 12" picture disc) (1984)
- Those Who Do Not (2x12") (1984)
- Descending (1984)
- Mouth of the Night (CD, LP, 12" picture disc) (1985)
- Themes 2 (LP) (1985)
- Themes 3 (LP) (1986)
- The Magickal Mystery D Tour EP (1986)
- Allegory and Self (CD, LP, 12" picture disc) (1988)
- Jack the Tab – Acid Tablets Volume One (CD, LP, 12" picture disc) (1988)
- Tekno Acid Beat (CD, LP) (1988)
- Kondole (CD) (1989)
- At Stockholm (CD) (1990)
- Jack the Tab/Tekno Acid Beat (2xCD, 2X12") (1990)
- Towards Thee Infinite Beat (CD, 12", cassette) (1990)
- Beyond Thee Infinite Beat (CD, 2x12", cassette) (1990)
- Direction ov Travel (CD) (1991)
- Ultrahouse The L.A. Connection (CD) (1991)
- Cold Dark Matter (CD) (1992)
- Peak Hour (1993)
- A Hollow Cost (CD) (1994)
- AL – OR – AL (CD) (1994)
- Electric Newspaper Issue One (CD) (1994)
- Cathedral Engine (CD) (1994)
- Sugarmorphoses (CD) (1994)
- Ultradrug (CD) (1994)
- Sirens (Ultradrug – Thee Sequel) (CD) (1995)
- Electric Newspaper Issue Two (CD) (1995)
- Breathe (CD) (1995)
- Electric Newspaper Issue Three (CD) (1995)
- Trip Reset (CD) (1996)
- Cold Blue Torch (1996)
- Column One & Psychic TV – E-Lusive (1997)
- Hell Is Invisible... Heaven Is Her/e (CD) (2007)
- Mr. Alien Brain vs. the Skinwalkers (2008)
- Snakes (2014)
- Alienist (CD) (2016)

== EPs ==
- Psychic TV/PTV3 – Alien Brain Vs Maggot Brain (12" Vinyl only) (Vanity Case Records 2010)
- Psychic TV/PTV3 – Mother Sky Vs Alien Sky (12" Vinyl only) (2011)
- Psychic TV/PTV3 – Thank you (12" Vinyl only) (2011)
- Psychic TV/PTV3 – Silver Sundown Machine Vs. Alien Lightning Meat Machine (12" Vinyl only) (2012)
- Psychic TV/PTV3 – Greyhounds Of The Future / Alien Lightning Meat Machine (12" Vinyl only) (2013)

== Singles ==
- "Just Drifting" (1982)
- "The Full Pack" (1983)
- "Unclean" (7", 12") (1984)
- "Roman P" (1984)
- "Godstar" (1985)
- "Good Vibrations" (1986)
- "Magick Defends Itself" (1986)
- "Joy" (1988)
- "Tune In (Turn On the Acid House)" (1988)
- "Je T'Aime" (7", 12") (1989)
- "Love War Riot" (1989)
- "High Jack" (1990)
- "I.C. Water" (1990)
- "Ultrahouse the Twelve Inch Mixes" (1991)
- "Re-Mind" (1993)
- "Tribal" (1994)
- Column One & Psychic TV – E-Lusive (1997)
- "Snowflake/Illusive" (2002)

== Compilation albums ==
- Splinter Test 1 (3 x CD + box set) (1993)
- Splinter Test 2 (3 x CD + box set) (1993)
- Hex Sex: The Singles Part 1 (CD) (1994)
- Beauty From Thee Beast – Thee Best ov Psychic TV and Genesis P-Orridge (CD) (1995)
- Godstar: The Singles – Pt. 2 (CD) (1995)
- Origin of the Species: A Supply of Two Tablets of Acid (2 x CD) (1998)
- Best Ov: Time's Up (CD) (1999)
- "Origin of the Species" Volume Too!: A Second Supply of Two Tablets of Acid (2 x CD) (1999)
- "Origin of the Species" Volume III: The Final Supply of Two Tablets of Acid (2 x CD) (2002)
- Godstar: Thee Director's Cut (2 x CD) (2004)
- Fishscales Falling: A Smogasbord ov Delights – Mixtape Volume 1 (digital) (2016) – iTunes exclusive

== Live releases ==
- At the Edge (2 x cassette)
- Finsbury Park (cassette)
- Hackney Empire (cassette)
- Hamburg 16;9;84 (cassette)
- Hammersmith Palais 19:5:85 (cassette)
- Berlin Atonal Vol. 1 (LP) (1984)
- Berlin Atonal Vol. 2 (LP) (1984)
- N.Y. Scum (LP) (1984)
- Descending (CD) (1985)
- Live in Paris (LP) (1986)
- Live in Tokyo (LP) (1986)
- Live at Final Wars (LP) (1986)
- Live en Suisse (LP) (1987)
- Live in Glasgow (LP) (1987)
- Live in Gottingen (LP) (1987)
- Live in Heaven (LP) (1987)
- Live in Reykjavik (LP) (1987)
- Live in Toronto (LP) (1987)
- Temporary Temple (LP) (1987)
- Album 10 (LP) Picture LP. Limited Edition of 1000 numbered copies only (1988)
- Live at the 930 Club Washington, D.C. (Cassette) (1988)
- Live at Thee Circus (LP) (1988)
- Live at Thee Mardi Gras (LP) (1988)
- A Real Swedish Live Show (1989)
- Live at Thee Pyramid (LP, LP picture disc) (1989)
- Live at Thee Ritz (LP) (1989)
- Live at the Berlin Wall Part One (CD) (1990)
- Live at the Berlin Wall Part Two (CD) (1990)
- Live in Bregenz (CD, LP) (1990)
- Temporary Temple & Atonal (CD) (1993)
- Mein-Goett-In-Gen (CD) (1994)
- Live in Berlin I (CD) (2003) – reissue of Live at the Berlin Wall Part One
- Live in Berlin II (CD) (2003) – reissue of Live at the Berlin Wall Part Two
- Live in Thee East Village (CD) (2003) – reissue of Blinded Eye in Thee Pyramid
- Live in Europa I (CD) (2003) – official release of the bootleg Rare and Alive
- Black
- Live in Thee Mean Fiddler (CD) (2003)
- Live in Astoria (CD) (2003) – reissue of Live at Thee Circus
- Live in Glasgow Plus (CD) (2003)
- Live in Russia (CD) (2006)

== Other releases ==
- Two Interviews (cassette)
- Interviews (2 x cassette)
- (untitled interview cassette)
- Temple ov Psychick Youth (cassette)
- Listen Today (CD, video) (1987)
- Psychic TV / PTV3 USB (USB stick)

== Various artist compilation appearances ==
- "Boys Are Girls and Girls Are Boys" on Silver Monk Time – A Tribute to the Monks (2006)
- "Only Love Can Break Your Heart" on The Bridge – A Tribute to Neil Young (1989)

== Video releases ==
- Hyperdelia (VHS) (1986)
- 8Transmissions8 (1987)
- Joy (VHS) (1989)
- Black (VHS) (1991)
- Maple Syrup (VHS) (1991)
- Beauty From Thee Beast (VHS) (1995)
- Time's Up Live (DVD) (2001)
- Black Joy (DVD)
- Psychic TV Live at the Coral Room (DVD) (2004)

== Bootlegs and unofficial ==
- Ov Power (1984)
- Live Transmission (1984)
- Southern Comfort (1986)
