= The Grid =

English house music group

- Origin: London, England
- Genres: House
- Years active: 1988–1996, 2003–present
- Labels: East West, Virgin, Deconstruction, Some Bizzare
- Members: Richard Norris
- Past members: Sacha Rebecca Souter (vocals); David Ball

The Grid were an English electronic dance group, consisting of David Ball (formerly of Soft Cell) and Richard Norris, with guest contributions from other musicians. They are best known for the hits "Swamp Thing", "Texas Cowboys", "Crystal Clear", "Rollercoaster" and "Floatation". Ball died on 22 October 2025.

== Band members ==
- Richard Norris – keyboards, drum programming
- David Ball – keyboards, programming (died 2025)
- Sacha Souter – vocals

== History ==
The Grid formed in 1988, after both Ball and Norris had worked with Psychic TV on the Jack the Tab – Acid Tablets Volume One album. They recorded the track "Meet Every Situation Head On" together as "M.E.S.H.". The Grid had their first success with their debut single, "Floatation", released on East West Records in 1990. They went on to release a string of ten UK hit singles and four albums, and toured the UK, Europe, Asia and Australia. The group's 1994 album Evolver reached No. 14 in the UK Albums Chart. The lead single from this album, "Swamp Thing", features elaborate banjo lines played by Roger Dinsdale. "Swamp Thing" proved to be a commercial success in the UK, Europe and Australia, reaching No. 3 in the UK and Australia, and selling a total of one million copies.

In 1996, Norris and Ball agreed to a hiatus in order to pursue individual music interests. Norris formed The Droyds with Andy Chatterley, who went on to remix tracks by musicians including Armand Van Helden and Siobhan Fahey. Norris also wrote the official biography of Paul Oakenfold, published in 2007. Ball reformed Soft Cell with Marc Almond, and also wrote music scores for films. Norris has since formed the psychedelic duo, Beyond The Wizard's Sleeve, with DJ Erol Alkan, and has released a number of solo records and remixes under the name The Time and Space Machine.

The duo reunited in 2005, initially playing two gigs under the name GDM with female singer Misty Woods, before writing and recording new material as The Grid. A single, "Put Your Hands Together", was released in 2007 and an album, Doppelgänger, followed in 2008. Both were released on the Some Bizzare label. The album featured vocals by the British musician, Chris Braide.

In 2018, during the second reunion of Soft Cell, Ball and Norris released a new album as the Grid, One Way Traffic, which was recorded as part of Moog Music's "The Moog Sound Lab" program, using the Moog modular synthesizers.

In 2021, Ball and Norris collaborated with Robert Fripp on a new album, Leviathan.

== Discography ==
=== Albums ===
Year	Album	UK	AUS	SWE	SWI	Label
1990	Electric Head	–	–	–	–	East West Records
1992	456	–	199	–	–	Virgin Records
1994	Evolver	14	51	27	46	Deconstruction Records
1995	Music for Dancing	67	–	–	–	Deconstruction Records
2008	Doppelgänger	–	–	–	–	Some Bizzare Records
2018	One Way Traffic	–	–	–	–	Moog Recordings Library
2021	Leviathan (with Robert Fripp)	–	–	–	–	Discipline Global Mobile

=== Singles ===
Year	Single	Peak chart positions										Certifications (sales thresholds)	Album
Year	Single	UK	AUS	AUT	BEL (Fla)	GER	IRE	NED	NOR	SWE	SWI	Certifications (sales thresholds)	Album
1989	"On the Grid"	—	—	—	—	—	—	—	—	—	—		Single only
1989	"Intergalactia"	—	—	—	—	—	—	—	—	—	—		Electric Head
1990	"Floatation"	60	102	—	—	—	—	—	—	—	—		Electric Head
1990	"A Beat Called Love"	64	—	—	—	—	—	—	—	—	—		Electric Head
1990	"Origins of Dance"	96	—	—	—	—	—	—	—	—	—		Single only
1991	"Boom!"	—	—	—	—	—	—	—	—	—	—		456
1992	"Figure of 8"	50	—	—	—	—	—	—	—	—	—		456
1992	"Heartbeat"	72	188	—	—	—	—	—	—	—	—		456
1993	"Crystal Clear"	27	—	—	—	—	—	—	—	—	—		456
1993	"Texas Cowboys"	21	—	—	—	—	18	—	—	36	—		Evolver
1994	"Swamp Thing"	3	3	4	4	13	4	7	2	4	6	BPI: Silver; ARIA: Platinum	Evolver
1994	"Rollercoaster"	19	59	—	45	—	11	—	—	31	—		Evolver
1994	"Texas Cowboys" (re-release)	17	74	—	40	—	18	—	—	—	—		Evolver
1995	"Diablo"	32	—	—	—	—	—	—	—	—	—		Music for Dancing
2006	"Slammer" / "Slinker"	—	—	—	—	—	—	—	—	—	—		Doppelgänger
2007	"Put Your Hands Together"	—	—	—	—	—	—	—	—	—	—		Doppelgänger
"—" denotes releases that did not chart
