= Peter Christopherson =

English musician (1955–2010)

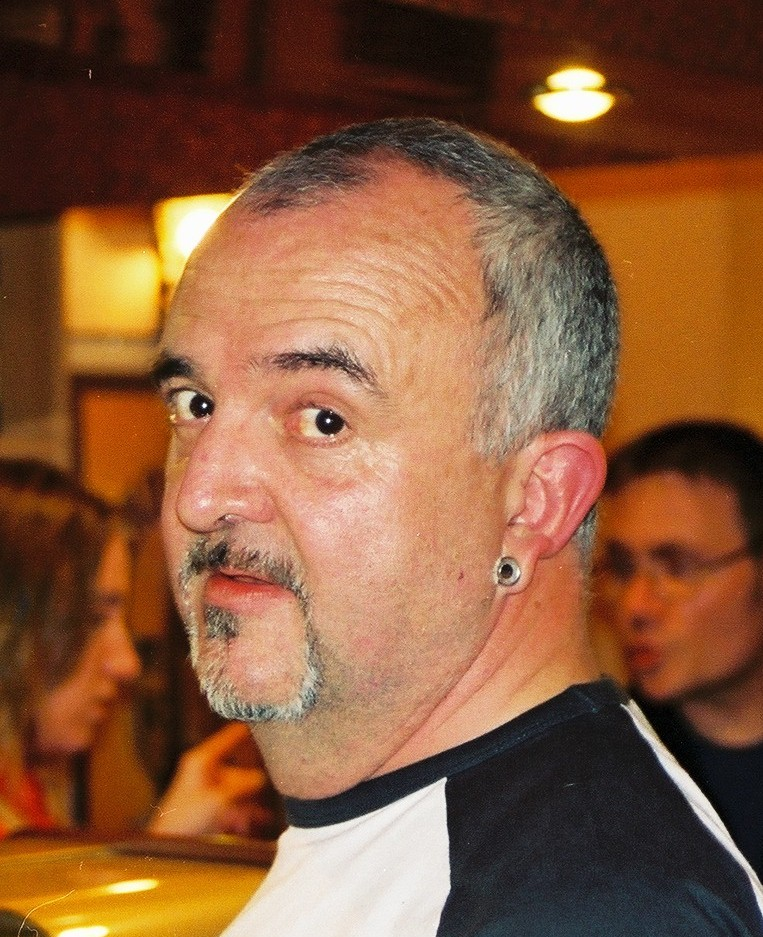
- Christopherson in 2007

Background information
- Also known as: Sleazy
- Born: Peter Martin Christopherson; 27 February 1955; Leeds, England
- Died: 25 November 2010 (aged 55) Bangkok, Thailand
- Genres: Industrial; experimental; electronic
- Occupations: Musician; songwriter; music video director; commercial artist; designer; photographer
- Instruments: Keyboards; synthesizer; electronics; sampler; cornet
- Years active: 1975–2010
- Labels: Threshold House; Eskaton; Chalice; Industrial
- Formerly of: Soisong; The Threshold HouseBoys Choir; Coil; Zos Kia; Throbbing Gristle; Psychic TV; The Nodding Folk

Peter Martin Christopherson (27 February 1955 – 25 November 2010), also known as Sleazy, was an English musician, music video director, commercial artist, designer, and photographer. He was best known as a member of design agency Hipgnosis and a co-founder of the bands Throbbing Gristle, Psychic TV, and Coil. He also directed a number of music videos, prominently the Nine Inch Nails short musical horror film Broken (1993). After his relocation to Thailand in 2005, he embarked on a solo career under the name The Threshold HouseBoys Choir.

== Early life ==
Peter Martin Christopherson was born in Leeds on 27 February 1955. His father, Derman Christopherson (1915–2000), was a professor of engineering who became master of Magdalene College, Cambridge. After school, Christopherson moved to Buffalo, New York to study computer programming, theatre design, and video at the University at Buffalo, where he developed an interest in performance art and the work of photographers such as Robert Mapplethorpe and Arthur Tress.

== Career ==
=== Throbbing Gristle, Psychic TV, and Coil ===
Christopherson was a founding member of the band Throbbing Gristle, who are credited with creating the industrial music genre. Following Throbbing Gristle's 1981 split, members Chris Carter and Cosey Fanni Tutti formed Chris & Cosey, while Christopherson and the band's other member Genesis P-Orridge formed Psychic TV.

John Balance met Christopherson as a Throbbing Gristle fan and the two became intimate partners. Christopherson worked on the first two Psychic TV albums, Force the Hand of Chance and Dreams Less Sweet, joined by Balance on the latter. The two performed live several times with Psychic TV prior to their departure to form Coil.

Coil consisted primarily of Christopherson and Balance, occasionally joined by personnel including Steven E. Thrower, Drew McDowall and Thighpaulsandra. Balance was the band's lyricist and primary vocalist, and also played the Chapman Stick and some keyboards.

Over two decades, Coil released myriad recordings, in addition to contributing to the work of other artists. They recorded parts of the album The New Backwards at Nothing Studios in New Orleans, owned by musician Trent Reznor at the time. In the liner notes of the 2008 CD release, Christopherson wrote: "Thanks to everyone there, especially Trent Reznor who made it all possible."

Despite Christopherson's long and extensive history as a musical artist, he only released two tracks under the name "Peter Christopherson". The first, "In My Head A Crystal Sphere of Heavy Fluid", appeared on the compilation Foxtrot, a benefit album for Balance's rehabilitation from alcohol dependence, while the second, "All Possible Numbers", appeared eleven years later on Autumn Blood (Constructions) released on Fourth Dimension Records.

In 2005, following Balance's death at the home he and Christopherson shared in Weston-super-Mare, Christopherson relocated from England to Bangkok, Thailand and founded the solo project The Threshold HouseBoys Choir. He also released the final Coil albums —The Remote Viewer, Black Antlers, ...And The Ambulance Died in His Arms and The New Backwards—on the band's own Threshold House label. In addition to the CD releases, Christopherson also released a 16-DVD box set following his relocation, entitled Colour Sound Oblivion, that was produced in a wooden box, in which a fifteen-page booklet, the program for Balance's funeral ceremony and a large collection of 6-inch × 4-inch postcards (mainly tour photographs) were also included.

Throbbing Gristle also reformed for a few concerts in 2004 and announced a new album called Part Two. The group announced several additional concerts in 2007 for the promotion of the album before disbanding again in 2010.

=== Other musical projects ===
In 2007 Christopherson released the debut album of The Threshold HouseBoys Choir. The album, Form Grows Rampant, consists of five "parts" or songs, and includes a DVD of the album set to video footage of Thai rituals in Krabi, Thailand. One tour promoter who organized a Threshold HouseBoys Choir concert described it as "easily the most shocking thing I have ever experienced".

In 2008 Christopherson and Ivan Pavlov (aka CoH) started a new project called Soisong. The band officially premiered in Tokyo on 9 March 2008 and later performed several shows in Europe, having self-released their debut EP. As part of the tour, Soisong performed a live soundtrack to Derek Jarman's film Blue in Rovereto, Italy. In April of the same year, Christopherson and Pavlov, alongside David Tibet, Othon Mataragas and Ernesto Tomasini, also performed a live soundtrack for The Angelic Conversation in Turin, Italy.

In 2009 Soisong recorded their first full-length album xAj3z, the release of which was followed by a European Reunion Tour and a worldwide campaign in search of the band's missing virtual vocalists featured on the record. In 2010 Soisong declared a "Split Phase 2010", during which all of the members would concentrate on their personal work; however, two independently recorded solo EPs, both entitled Soisong, were scheduled for release. Christopherson never finalized his work for the release, but Soisong Split was eventually published in September 2012, nearly two years after Christopherson's death. The release consists of a CoH Soisong EP by Pavlov, originally recorded in 2010, and a collection of four unpublished sketches by Christopherson that were made available on the band's website.

In 2010 Christopherson started collaborating with Hirsute Pursuit, featuring Harley Phoenix and Bryin Dall, via email. They finished two songs together, "One Sleazy Night in Bangkok" and "One Sleazy Night in New Orleans", for the album Tighten That Muscle Ring. The album was signed to Cold Spring Records, but Christopherson died prior to its release. Writing for the Quietus online publication, Luke Turner claimed that the album was "the most sexy and perverted album of 2012".

Also in 2010, Christopherson was sent an iPad by musician Trent Reznor that contained music for a potential collaboration. Reznor had asked for his blessing to use the moniker "How to Destroy Angels" for a musical project that Reznor was creating with his wife (Christopherson had used the phrase in 1984, as the title of the first recording released by Coil). Christopherson responded amenably, suggesting that they could potentially collaborate as part of the project. Christopherson explained that Reznor was a "perfect gentleman" in regard to the way in which the matter was negotiated; however, Christopherson died before he was able to resend the iPad back to Reznor with his contribution.

The final music that was ever recorded by Christopherson occurred in Bangkok, Thailand with a project named "Electric Sewer Age" that also involved musician Danny Hyde. The original intention of the recordings was to complete a series of releases called "Moons Milk", but an album called In Final Phase was eventually released in 2013, with only 999 numbered CD copies made available. The CD is packaged in record sleeve-style thickened cardboard, and each copy is numbered from 1 to 999, while the insert sleeve displays a picture of Christopherson in his Bangkok studio that was taken at the moment that the recording was completed.

=== Visual art ===
Prior to his musical projects, Christopherson was a commercial artist, designer, and photographer. He was one of the three partners of the album cover design group Hipgnosis, which was responsible for many notable album covers of the 1970s, such as those of Pink Floyd (Wish You Were Here) and Peter Gabriel (first three albums). He also designed the logo of UK fashion label BOY London.

As a freelance photographer, Christopherson shot the first promotional images of the Sex Pistols in 1976. He later provided design work for SEX, the fashion boutique owned by Malcolm McLaren and Vivienne Westwood.

Christopherson remained involved with commercial art up until his later life. He directed over 40 music videos—for artists such as Rage Against the Machine, The The, Van Halen, Sepultura and Robert Plant—and was responsible for many television commercials. He filmed and directed the Threshold HouseBoys Choir DVD that was filmed in Thailand, as well as the infamous Broken. November 2014 saw the publication of a big retrospective book simply called "Peter Christopherson - Photography" by Edition Timeless, collecting many previously unseen photos from all areas of his work in photography but focusing on his private work.

== Influence ==
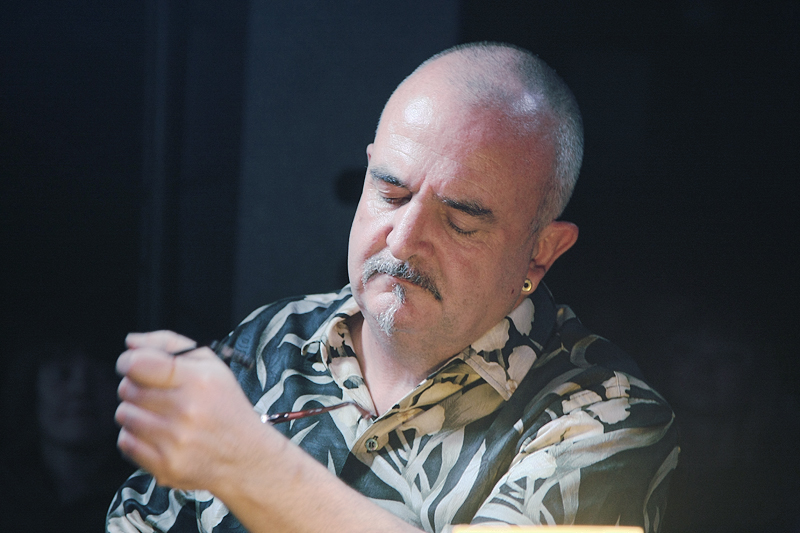
Christopherson in 2008

Writing for The Guardian, Dave Simpson credited Christopherson with using samplers on-stage before the Fairlight CMI popularised sampling. Also writing for The Guardian, Alexis Petridis described Christopherson and his Throbbing Gristle bandmate Chris Carter as "pioneers in technology", and noted a sampler that Carter had custom-built for Christopherson a number of years before sampling became popular. Christopherson explained Carter's construction and musical experimentation in a 1987 interview with Keyboard magazine:

It was a box that [TG synthesist] Chris Carter made for me, to my design that basically switched on and off – through inputs on tape recorders – six cassette machines, the output of each going to a different key. Many of the machines I used in TG were cassette machines that were stripped down and altered to play backward and forward and four tracks at once, the speed variable by flywheels. The very first sampling device there ever was, as far as I know, was manufactured by Mountain Hardware for Apple computers. It was designed to reproduce voice samples, and had a very limited selection of pitches. I was using that onstage in '79 or '80, which was before the first Fairlight was used commercially. So I've always had a soft spot for sampling.

== Death ==
On 25 November 2010, at the age of 55, Christopherson died in his sleep at his Bangkok home. The cause of death was never made public. At the time, he was working on a complete rework of Nico's album Desertshore, to be released as the Throbbing Gristle album The Desertshore Installation.

== Legacy ==
Genesis P-Orridge wrote a lengthy eulogy for Christopherson, in which they concluded:

Sleazy became a source of every suture for my heart, loving sustenance for my soul. He nurtured me with words of wise counsel garnered from his own similar and tragic losses. There had been a long sometimes desolate expanse between the seventies and now. But we had both crossed our abyss and we were blessed by Sleazy's loving nature to be able to accept his gentle embrace and, crying like a child we often are, be able to lovingly say to him, "I HAVE GOT MY FRIEND BACK." Many times, since then, we have stopped during hard times, confusing times, and we think of Sleazy and how his mastery of light went from cameras to hearts and souls, and that makes me smile and laugh. Which is as he would wish. We loved Sleazy in all he did...

Peter Gabriel paid tribute in a post on his website the day after Christopherson's death. Trent Reznor told Quietus in a February 2014 interview, "[Coil's] 'Tainted Love' video remains one of the greatest music videos of all time [...] if it's not immediately obvious: [Coil's album] Horse Rotorvator was deeply influential on me. What they did to your senses. What they could do with sound. What Jhonn was doing lyrically [...] Peter was a lovely guy. We had a respectful relationship."

== Discography ==
=== Solo as Peter Christopherson ===
- "In My Head a Crystal Sphere of Heavy Fluid" on Foxtrot (1998)
- "All Possible Numbers" on Autumn Blood (Constructions) (2009)
- "Time Machines II" (posthumously released in 2014)
- "The Art of Mirrors – Homage to Derek Jarman" (posthumously released in 2015)

=== Solo as The Threshold HouseBoys Choir ===
- ...It Just Is compilation contains the track "Mahil Athal Nadrach". (CD) (2005)
- X-Rated: The Dark Files compilation contains the track "So Young It Knows No Maturing". (CD) (2006)
- Form Grows Rampant debut album. (CD+DVD) (2007)
- Brainwaves 2008 compilation contains "Cap Rot Taxi" (CD) (2008)
- Amulet Edition limited release (200 pcs) 4 mini-cds in Amulet package (CD) (2008)

=== With SoiSong ===
- Soijin-No-Hi Octagonal CDEP / free download EP from www.soisong.com from March (2008)
- xAj3z Octagonal CD housed in fold out custom sleeve with colour inlay (2009)
- Soisong Octagonal COH CDEP / free download Sleazy EP from www.soisong.com (2010)

=== With Psychic TV ===
- Force the Hand of Chance
- Just Drifting
- Dreams Less Sweet
- Berlin Atonal Vol. 1
- Berlin Atonal Vol. 2
- N.Y. Scum
- Mein-Goett-In-Gen

=== Other contributions ===
Date of release	Song title	Released on	Group name released under	Musical role	
1980	"First/Last"	Something For Nobody	Monte Cazazza	featuring (technical supervision)	
1982		Seven Songs	23 Skidoo	featuring (production)	
1992	"First/Last"	The Worst of Monte Cazazza	Monte Cazazza	featuring (technical supervision)	
1993	"The Apocalyptic Folk in the Nodding God Unveiled"	The Nodding Folk	performer		
1996	"Videodrones; Questions"	Lost Highway soundtrack	Trent Reznor	production	
1996	"Driver Down"	Lost Highway Soundtrack	Trent Reznor	production	
1996		Who Can I Turn to Stereo etc	Nurse with Wound	guest	
2000	"Silence Is Golden"	Vox Tinnitus	CoH	vocals	
2001	"My Angel (Director's Cut)"	Love Uncut	CoH	vocals	
6 August 2001		The Michel Publicity Window E.P.	Thighpaulsandra	album artwork design	
2002	"Autumn"	Seasons	CoH	uses field recordings by Christopherson	
2005	"Unhealthy Red"	A Nature of Nonsense	Aural Rage	written by	
2008	"I'm in Black Out"	The Zsigmondy Experience	Sion Orgon	uses field recordings and vocals by Christopherson	
2012	"One Sleazy Night in Bangkok"	Tighten That Muscle Ring	Hirsute Pursuit	collaboration tracks with Harley Phoenix and Bryin Dall	1 of the last 2 tracks recorded before his death.
2012	"One Sleazy Night in New Orleans"	Tighten That Muscle Ring	Hirsute Pursuit	collaboration tracks with Harley Phoenix and Bryin Dall	1 of the last 2 tracks recorded before his death.

== Album artwork credits ==
"I [Peter Christopherson] worked as a free-lance photographer and contributor, then promoted to an assistant to Hipgnosis before becoming a partner, and continued to act also after I officially left the organization. So my contributions range from attempted but rejected artwork or design work, to partial contribution in either/both as an assistant, to being fully responsible for all design and artwork, such as the Peter Gabriel LPs. What you wish to document is up to you."

- A Certain Ratio – To Each...
- Dave Ball – In Strict Tempo
- Leather Nun – Slow Death EP
- Pink Floyd – A Nice Pair – "contributed photos as an assistant to Hipgnosis but did not do the design" – PC
- Pink Floyd – Animals (credited on LP and CD cover to Hipgnosis)
- Pink Floyd – Wish You Were Here (credited on LP and CD cover to Hipgnosis)
- Peter Gabriel – Peter Gabriel, aka "Peter Gabriel I" or "Car" (credited on LP and CD cover to Hipgnosis)
- Peter Gabriel – Peter Gabriel, aka "Peter Gabriel II" or "Scratch" (credited on LP and CD cover to Hipgnosis)
- Peter Gabriel – Peter Gabriel, aka "Peter Gabriel III" or "Melt" (credited on LP and CD cover to Hipgnosis)
