= Peak Hour (album) =

Studio album by Psychic TV
- Released: 1993
- Genre: Industrial, Acid House, Techno
- Label: Temple Records

Psychic TV Studio Album chronology
Cold Dark Matter (1992)	Peak Hour (1993)	A Hollow Cost (1994)

Peak Hour is an album by the English band Psychic TV, released in 1993.

== Critical reception ==
Professional ratings
Review scores
Source	Rating
AllMusic	2.5/5 stars

AllMusic wrote: "Electro beats and trippy electronic sounds conspire with weird vocal loops and other effects to make some of the most psychedelic dance music since early Funkadelic." Exclaim! noted that "the key to Psychic TV is the nuances in the aural distance of the sound field; it (whatever lies deep within there) is what alters your brain chemistry and causes you to relax in the long run."

== Credits and liner notes ==
- Artwork By [Cover] - Plasma Art
- Engineer – Dave Cat
- Keyboards [Additional] - Gavin Redman
- Mastered by - Keith
- Mixed by [Additional], Producer [Additional] - Deep Fry, The Greedy Beat Syndicate
- Performer - Andy Chatterley, Genesis P-Orridge, Anthony "Hugo" Longden, Matthew Best, Richard Schiessl, Sean Maher
- Producer – Richard Schiessl
- Written By - Psychic TV
- Recorded in London, San Francisco, Nepal between March and June 1993.
- Mixed in London and San Francisco July 1993.
- Mastered at JTS.

== Catalog numbers ==
- CD: Temple Records TOPY 068 CD
- 12" vinyl: Temple Records TOPY 068
- CD reissue: Tin Toy TTCD 013

== Track listing ==
=== CD version ===
1. "E-Male" - 7:49
2. "Dreamlined" - 5:40
3. "L.I.E.S." - 4:13
4. "Tribal" - 13:26
5. "Pregnant Pause" - 1:00
6. "Pain" - 6:24
7. "Everything Has To Happen" - 5:46
8. "How Does E Feel?" - 6:10
9. "Re-Mind" - 7:25

=== 12" vinyl version ===
Side A

1. "E-Male" - 7:49
2. "Dreamlined" - 5:40
3. "L.I.E.S." - 4:14
4. "Tribal" - 6:10

Side B

1. "Pain" - 6:24
2. "Everything Has To Happen" - 5:46
3. "How Does E Feel?" - 5:50
4. "Re-Mind" - 7:08

=== CD reissue version ===
1. "E-Male (ha hahahahheee oh that's funny)" - 7:49
2. "Dreamlined" - 5:40
3. "L.I.E.S." - 4:14
4. "Tribal" - 6:10
5. "Pain" - 6:24
6. "Everything Has To Happen" - 5:46
7. "How Does E Feel?" - 5:50
8. "Re-Mind" - 7:08
9. "Tribal coinci/dance mix" - 8:18
10. "Tribal analogue sex mix" - 8:38
11. "Godzilla "Return to the sea" Psychic TV remix" - 8:20
