= Moody Coup =

Studio album by Co La
- Released: May 7, 2013
- Studio: Matt Papich's kitchen studio, Baltimore; Gary’s Electric Studio, Brooklyn
- Genre: Sound collage; sound art; experimental
- Length: 37:50
- Label: Software
- Producer: Matt Papich; Joe Williams

Co La chronology
Daydream Repeater (2011)	Moody Coup (2013)	Hegemony of Delete (2014)

Singles from Moody Coup
- 1. "Melters Delight" Released: February 21, 2013; 2. "Deaf Christian" Released: April 2, 2013

Moody Coup is the second studio album of Co La, the project of Baltimore electronic music producer Matt Papich. The album follows a more indefinable music style yet cleaner sound than Co La's previous record Daydream Repeater (2011). The album uses both synthesizers and samples. It was released on May 7, 2013, by the imprint Software and garnered generally positive reviews from critics upon its release.

== Production and composition ==
Moody Coup strongly differs from Co La's previous album Daydream Repeater (2011) for its indefinable music style and "cleaner, "more defined" and "restrained" sound, as journalist Heather Phares described it. Bearded magazine's Ben Woord categorized the album as "seductively uneasy listening: genuinely odd but strangely accessible sampladelia." He reasoned that the "lurching rhythms and jarring juxtapositions have the potential to be unsettling as hell," but "he somehow makes it glossily textured and rather likeable." Moody Coup's arrangement is spacious, featuring pianos, rave music synthesizers, and samples in its sound palette. It features elements of dub, drum and bass, and jazz, with sounds deriving from reggae, barbershop, ambient, and techno.

Software's press release summarizes that on the album, "cryptic sources are enhanced and embellished to a point of transcendence." The source material varies heavily. The LP's most prominent samples are recordings of unnoticeable everyday sounds, such as dripping, sipping, birdsong, breathing, and scissor cutting, which led to Tiny Mix Tapes critic Sean Delanty to describe it as "an album that celebrates the unnoticed joys of human life itself." In terms of song samples, Moody Coup utilizes music from Neil Sedaka's "Next Door to an Angel" ("Deaf Christian") to Psychic TV's "Suspicious ("Suspicious") to "Sukiyaki" by Kyu Sakamoto ("Sukiyaki To Die For"). "Sukiyaki To Die For" only uses the melody of Sakamoto's song. As Papich explained, "It deviates to the point that the familiar bit feels elusive, and becomes something like a scent. It's processed like perfume."

== Release and promotion ==
Two singles were released from Moody Coup: "Melters Delight" on February 21, 2013, and "Deaf Christian" on April 2, 2013. "Deaf Christian"'s official video, directed by visual artist Strasser, was released on April 5, and depicts Papich crushing fruit in rhythm to the song. The video for "Make It Slay" premiered via Interview magazine on May 31, 2013. Also directed by Strasser, the video "is an alchemical blend of visuals featuring transmutable liquids, natural imagery, and a metaphysically improbable wineglass," the magazine's Nathan Reese summarized. On October 9, 2015, Software issued a bundle consisting of Moody Coup and another Co La album named No No (2015).

== Critical reception ==
Professional ratings
Review scores
Source	Rating
AllMusic	4/5 stars
Pitchfork	7.5/10
Spin	6/10
Tiny Mix Tapes	4/5 discs

Sean Delanty of Tiny Mix Tapes highlighted that Moody Coup's "disembodiment" of everyday foley gave the album "a remarkable sense of conceptual coherence and stylistic consistency." He also wrote that "there are moments on the album that transcend any sort of detached conceptualization and instead achieve an immediately satisfying viscerality," which resulted in an "intoxicating, otherworldly aesthetic." Phares opined in an AllMusic review, "Moody Coup might not be as transporting or concerned with sensual pleasures as Daydream Repeater was, but these ambitious, wide-ranging tracks are just as successful in their own right." Pitchfork called the LP better than most sound art music for "how naturally it comes together," also noting that the album had audio editing superior to Daydream Repeater's "lackadaisical" loop-based techniques: "His samples are better hidden and the tracks, while plenty rhythmic, are no longer quite so stubborn."

== Track listing ==
Derived from the liner notes of Moody Coup.

No.	Title	Length
1.	"Sukiyaki To Die For"	4:12
2.	"Melter's Delight"	3:40
3.	"Remarkable Features"	3:55
4.	"Deaf Christian"	4:14
5.	"Un"	4:04
6.	"Suspicious (Sandman Fix)"	4:06
7.	"Baby's Breath"	3:33
8.	"Head In Hole In Space"	3:14
9.	"Sympathy Flinch"	3:46
10.	"Make It Slay (Barbershop Solo)"	3:06
Total length:		37:50

== Personnel ==
Derived from the liner notes and press release of Moody Coup.

- Composed by Matt Papich in Ableton Live at his Baltimore kitchen studio
- Produced by Co La and Joe Williams
- Engineered by Al Carlson at Gary's Electric Studio in Brooklyn
- Vocals on "Sukiyaki To Die For," "Melter's Delight," "Deaf Christian," "Baby's Breath," and "Sympathy Flinch" by Angel Deradoorian
- Mastered by Andreas "Loop-o" Lubich
- Artwork by John Bohl

== Release history ==
Region	Date	Format(s)	Label
Worldwide	May 7, 2013	CD; digital download; vinyl	Software
