= Snakes (Psychic TV album) =

Studio album by Psychic TV
- Released: December 2014
- Recorded: 2014
- Genre: Experimental rock, post-punk, psychedelic rock, industrial rock, industrial, experimental,
- Length: 41:39
- Label: Angry Love Production

Psychic TV chronology
Mr. Alien Brain vs. the Skinwalkers (2008)	Snakes (2014)	Alienist (2016)

Snakes is a 2014 album by avant-garde music group Psychic TV. It was written after Genesis P-Orridge's trip to Benin and is lyrically focused on the voodoo culture.

== Track listing ==
No.	Title	Length
1.	"After You're Dead, She Said"	6:56
2.	"In Solitude of Memory"	0:28
3.	"Burning the Old Home"	13:16
4.	"(It Was) Never Enough"	4:44
5.	"Snakes"	5:10
6.	"Thee Mountaineer"	4:45
7.	"Project Expect!"	1:32
8.	"Overdriven Overload"	4:45

== Personnel ==
- Alice Genese - bass guitar, backing vocals
- Edward O'Dowd - drums, percussion, sampling, producer
- Jeff Berner - engineer, guitar, mixing, programming, synth
- Gary Atturio - engineer
- Jess Stewart - keyboards and piano (tracks: 3, 4, 5, 6, 7, 8)
- Genesis Breyer P-Orridge - lead vocals
- Alex DeTurk - mastering
- John Weingarten - piano (track: 1)
- Phillip Cope - theremin (track: 5)
- John Jackson - violin (tracks: 1, 3, 5, 6)
