= Slow Death =

Slow Death may refer to:

== Books and comics ==
- Slow Death (comics), an underground comix anthology
- Slow Death, a 1996 novel by Stewart Home
- Slow Death, a 2003 non-fiction book about the suspected serial killer David Parker Ray by Jim Fielder
- "Slow Death", a fictional drug in the novel A Scanner Darkly by Philip K. Dick

== Music ==
- Slow Death (album), a 2016 album by Carnifex
- Slow Death EP, a 1979 EP by the Leather Nun
- "Slow Death", a 1989 song by the Flamin' Groovies from Groovies' Greatest Grooves
