= Orridge =

Orridge may refer to:

- John Orridge, governor of Bury St Edmunds prison at the execution of William Corder
- Genesis P-Orridge (b. 1950), an English performer, musician, writer and artist
- Paula P-Orridge, (b. 1963), a British musician
