= Swamp Thing (song) =

1994 single by the Grid

Single by the Grid

from the album Evolver
- Released: 23 May 1994
- Genre: House; folktronica
- Length: 3:56
- Label: Deconstruction; RCA
- Songwriters: Richard Norris; David Ball
- Producer: The Grid

The Grid singles chronology
"Texas Cowboys" (1993)	"Swamp Thing" (1994)	"Rollercoaster" (1994)

Music video
- "Swamp Thing" on YouTube

"Swamp Thing" is a song by British electronic music group the Grid, released as a single on 23 May 1994 by Deconstruction and RCA Records. It was also included on the group's third album, Evolver (1994). The song peaked at number three on the UK, Australian, and Danish singles charts and reached the top five in an additional seven countries, including Finland and Norway, where it reached number two. Its computer generated music video, consisting of dancing robots and a crawling baby, received solid airplay on music television channels.

"Swamp Thing" was later sampled in "Banjo Thing" by Infernal and "Swamp Thing" by Pegboard Nerds. British magazine NME ranked "Swamp Thing" number 41 in their list of the 50 Best Songs of 1994 and it was nominated in the category for Tune of the Year at the International Dance Awards 1995.

== Background and release ==
"When we played it at Ministry of Sound with Roger, there was a girl at the front staring at his banjo like she'd never seen one before."

— Dave Ball talking to The Guardian about the song.

The Grid formed in 1988, after Dave Ball and Richard Norris had worked with Psychic TV on the 1990 album Jack the Tab – Acid Tablets Volume One, which would later be described as "Britain's first acid house record". "Swamp Thing" was made after Ball found banjo player Roger Dinsdale in an Irish pub in Marylebone and asked him to come to the studio. Dinsdale was a folk musician who also played the guitar and the mandolin. The Grid got him to lay down some riffs written by himself over a bassline and drumbeat. No digital was used apart from computers, so the group had this massive tape loop spliced together, running all over the studio. Dinsdale died in July 2009.

Norris told in a 2024-interview, "'Swamp Thing' was meant to be joyous and immediate for the dancefloor, but we also knew that a banjo house record would piss off the people who were writing long, boring articles about so-called "intelligent techno". Mike Pickering from M People gave it the dancefloor seal of approval when he played it at The Haçienda in Manchester. The duo then performed at the Radio 1 roadshow in Cleethorpes, which led to "Swamp Thing" being included on their playlist. The single ended up going to number three on the UK Singles Chart, staying in the charts for 17 weeks over the summer and autumn of 1994. It is almost completely instrumental, consisting mainly of drums, synthesizer sounds and banjo. The only vocals are "Well alright, watch out", "Feel alright" and "I just dig it", sampled from the 1973 reggae song "Papa Do It Sweet" by Lloyd & Patsy.

== Critical reception ==
Music writer and columnist James Masterton wrote, "I can detect a theme developing here over who can make the best dance record out of the silliest original idea. As if Doop wasn't bad enough we now have the Grid moving away from ambient dub and scoring their biggest hit ever with a dance track based on a banjo reel." He added that it "actually is quite inspired". Holly Barringer from Melody Maker complimented "Swamp Thing" as "a cheeky little number" and "a kind of Deliverance with disco up its butt", concluding, "You can't help but squeal like a pig at the sheer foot-tappingness of the darn thing." Maria Jimenez from Music & Media constated that the group "storms through Europe with their banjo-ignited stormer". Andy Beevers from Music Week's RM Dance Update said, "Part Two of the Grid's US travelogue takes us east from Texas [with their 1993 single "Texas Cowboys"] to the Deep South, where they successfully set frantic banjo picking against uptempo house beats to create a high energy hoe down." He also declared it as "a mad banjo and house hybrid [that] works surprisingly well."

Another RM editor, James Hamilton, described it as "a breezy progressive throbber" in his weekly dance column. Ben Willmott from NME named it Single of the Week, writing, "Bonkers cowpunk disco of the highest order from the vastly underrated Texas cowboys. No need for reams of descriptive prose here — 'Swamp Thing' is the first and last word in banjo house and, more to the point, it's damn good fun too. Roll on the kazoo-gabber crossover." NME editor John Mulvey felt "Swamp Thing" "is veteran techno-esoterics the Grid's latest whimsical sonic journey; a long, fierce trip into Deliverance country that mixes square dance-friendly banjos with the kind of sleek trance disco perfected by Underworld and Fluke. A bit of a novelty — all that finger-picking nonsense gets royally on your tits after a while — but endearing enough in its own backwoods, inbred, rabble-rousing redneck way." The magazine's Paul Moody named it a "brain-denting belter". Mark Frith from Smash Hits deemed the song a highlight of the album.

== Chart performance ==
"Swamp Thing" reached number two in Finland, Norway and Scotland. It was a top-10 hit in Austria, Belgium, Denmark, Iceland, Ireland, the Netherlands, Spain, Sweden, Switzerland and the United Kingdom. On the Eurochart Hot 100, it hit number four on 3 September 1994. In the UK, the single peaked at number three during its fifth week on the UK Singles Chart, on 26 June. It also reached number one on Music Week's Dance Singles chart. Additionally, "Swamp Thing" was a top-20 hit in Germany and a top-50 hit in France. Outside Europe, "Swamp Thing" reached number three in Australia as well as on the RPM Dance/Urban chart in Canada. It also peaked at number 17 in Israel and number 41 in New Zealand. The single was awarded with a silver record in the UK with a sale of 200,000 copies and a platinum record in Australia, after 70,000 units were sold.

== Music video ==
"Swamp Thing" was accompanied by a music video. The video switches back and forth between two scenes: computer-generated imagery of a group of robots dancing to a techno beat and a blank white landscape with a crawling baby and music synthesiser instruments. The scene with the baby and the instruments also inspired the Evolver album cover art. The video received heavy rotation on MTV Europe and was A-listed on Germany's VIVA. It was later made available by Vevo on YouTube, where it has received more than 3.5 million views as of February 2026.

== Track listings ==
- 12-inch single, UK
1. "Swamp Thing" (Grid Southern Comfort Mix)
2. "Swamp Thing" (Deep Dub Piece)
3. "Swamp Thing" (Deep Piece Mix)
- CD single, UK
1. "Swamp Thing" (Radio Mix) – 3:56
2. "Swamp Thing" (Southern Comfort Mix) – 7:10
3. "Swamp Thing" (Deep Dub Piece) – 7:10
4. "Swamp Thing" (Deep Piece Mix) – 8:53
- Cassette single, UK
1. "Swamp Thing" (Radio Mix)
2. "Swamp Thing" (Deep Piece Mix)
3. "Swamp Thing" (Radio Mix)
4. "Swamp Thing" (Deep Piece Mix)

== Charts ==
=== Weekly charts ===
Chart (1994)	Peak position
Australia (ARIA)	3
Austria (Ö3 Austria Top 40)	4
Belgium (Ultratop 50 Flanders)	4
Canada Dance/Urban (RPM)	4
Denmark (IFPI)	3
Europe (Eurochart Hot 100)	4
Europe (European Dance Radio)	14
Finland (Suomen virallinen lista)	2
France (SNEP)	45
Germany (GfK)	13
Iceland (Íslenski Listinn Topp 40)	8
Ireland (IRMA)	4
Israel (Israeli Singles Chart)	17
Netherlands (Dutch Top 40)	5
Netherlands (Single Top 100)	7
New Zealand (Recorded Music NZ)	41
Norway (VG-lista)	2
Scottish Singles Sales (Official Charts)	2
Spain (AFYVE)	8
Sweden (Sverigetopplistan)	4
Switzerland (Schweizer Hitparade)	6
UK Singles (Official Charts)	3
UK Dance (Official Charts)	13
UK Airplay (Music Week)	20
UK Dance (Music Week)	1
UK Club Chart (Music Week)	17

=== Year-end charts ===
Chart (1994)	Position
Australia (ARIA)	17
Belgium (Ultratop)	55
Europe (Eurochart Hot 100)	30
Germany (Media Control)	71
Netherlands (Dutch Top 40)	54
Netherlands (Single Top 100)	73
Sweden (Topplistan)	23
Switzerland (Schweizer Hitparade)	24
UK Singles (OCC)	17

== Certifications ==
Region	Certification	Certified units/sales
Australia (ARIA)	Platinum	70,000^{^}
United Kingdom (BPI)	Silver	200,000^{^}
^{^} Shipments figures based on certification alone.

== Release history ==
Region	Date	Format(s)	Label(s)	Ref.
United Kingdom	23 May 1994	12-inch vinyl; CD; cassette	Deconstruction; RCA	
Australia	18 July 1994	CD; cassette	Deconstruction; RCA	
