= Electric Head =

Studio album by The Grid
- Released: 1 October 1990
- Genre: Techno; house; synth-pop; electro; downtempo; ambient
- Length: 51:23
- Label: East West
- Producer: Richard Norris; Dave Ball

The Grid chronology
Electric Head (1990)	456 (1992)

Professional ratings
Review scores
Source	Rating
Allmusic	2.5/5 stars

Electric Head is the debut album by English electronic group the Grid, released in 1990. An extended, double-CD version of the album is released on Cherry Red Records in August 2013. The second CD includes remixes of the singles from Andrew Weatherall, Robert Gordon and Farley and Heller.

Alternative mixes of "Floatation" and "A Beat Called Love" were released as singles. Mixes were prepared for a single release of "This Must Be Heaven" but remained unreleased until included on the 2013 reissue of the album.

== Track listing ==
All tracks written by Grid members Richard Norris and Dave Ball.

Side one

1. "One Giant Step" – 6:11
2. "Interference" – 0:34
3. "Are You Receiving" – 4:32
4. "Islamatron" – 3:33
5. "The Traffic" – 0:14
6. "Driving Instructor" – 4:40
7. "A Beat Called Love" – 4:01
8. "The First Stroke" – 0:13

Side two

1. "Central Locking" – 0:41
2. "Intergalactica" – 6:10
3. "Beautiful and Profound" – 0:10
4. "This Must Be Heaven" – 4:15
5. "Machine Delay" – 0:09
6. "Doctor Celine" – 3:45
7. "Typical Waterloo Sunset" – 0:14
8. "Strange Electric Sun" – 4:19
9. "Floatation" – 5:06
10. "Virtual" (only on the CD) – 2:36

== Personnel ==
- Dave Ball - sampler, synthesizer, drum machine, computer, toy, grand piano
- Richard Norris - vocals, vocoder, tape, effects, drum machine, electric guitar, electric piano, computer

with:

- Sacha Souter - vocals on "A Beat Called Love" and "Floatation"
- Cobalt Stargazer (Geoff Bird) - guitar
- Andy Murray - slide guitar
- Polo - percussion
- Guy Barker - trumpet
- Julian Stringle - clarinet
- Beate Schulz, Di Wright, Gini Ball, Gloria Robakowski, Jaq Robinson, Kim Schillinglaw, Michele Oldland, Sasha Rebecca Souter, Sylvia Mason-James - backing vocals
- Paul Davis - cover artwork
