= P-Orridge =

P-Orridge is a surname. Notable people with the surname include:

- Genesis P-Orridge (1950–2020), English artist, musician and writer
- Paula P-Orridge (born 1963), English musician, writer and entrepreneur
