= Music for Dancing =

Remix album by The Grid
- Released: 1995
- Genre: House, techno, ambient house
- Length: 74:40
- Label: Deconstruction
- Producer: The Grid

The Grid chronology
Evolver (1994)	Music for Dancing (1995)	Doppelgänger (2008)

Professional ratings
Review scores
Source	Rating
Allmusic	2.5/5 stars
Muzik	3.5/5 stars
NME	(7/10)

Music for Dancing is a 1995 album released by English electronic artists The Grid. It was their last album released before their 1996 hiatus. Music for Dancing contains remixes of previously released tracks and one new track, "Diablo."

== Track listing ==
1. "Floatation" (Subsonic Grid Mix) – 7:09
2. "Crystal Clear" (456 Mix) – 4:39
3. "Boom!" (Freestyle Mix) – 7:34
4. "Figure of 8" (Tribal Trance Mix) – 6:23
5. "Rollercoaster" (Nemesis Mix) – 6:51
6. "Texas Cowboys" (Ricochet Mix) – 5:53
7. "Swamp Thing" (Southern Comfort Mix) – 7:14
8. "Crystal Clear" (Prankster Prophet Mix) – 7:41
9. "Figure of 8" (Todd's Master Dub) – 6:26
10. "Diablo" (The Devil Rides Out Mix) – 6:33
11. "Rollercoaster" (Yellow Submarine Retake) – 8:17
