= Pagan Day =

1984 album by Psychic TV

Studio album by Psychic TV
- Released: 23 December 1984
- Label: Temple Records TOPY 003

Pagan Day
- TOPY 017 1986, black vinyl

Pagan Day (originally released as A Pagan Day (Pages From a Notebook)) is a 1984 album by English experimental band Psychic TV. The cover photograph is of Caresse P-Orridge taken by Andrew Rawling.

== Recording ==
All music was recorded on a 4-track cassette machine under the guidance of Alex Fergusson, an original co-founder of the group, with Genesis P-Orridge. A Pagan Day was subtitled Pages From a Notebook as the material was a sketch of the songs, revealing of the process itself.

All songs were written by Genesis P-Orridge and Alex Fergusson, with the exception of "Translucent Carriages" written by Tom Rapp of the group Pearls Before Swine.

"Cold Steel" is a demo version (with vocals by Fergusson) of "The Orchids", originally released on 1983's Dreams Less Sweet. Different arrangements of "We Kiss" and "Baby's Gone Away", and a completely rearranged "New Sexuality" with new lyrics (retitled "She Was Surprised") appeared on 1988's Allegory and Self.

== Release ==
This recording was first released as TOPY 003 on 23 December 1984 at 11pm (the 23rd hour of the 23rd day) as a picture disc, limited to 999 copies. It was only available at the Rough Trade record shop in London.

One side of the original vinyl was a full-color photograph of Carresse P-Orridge as a baby, the other side had text in red on white. It was only available to shops and distributors between 11 am and 12 am on launch day. The 1984 picture disc release was limited to 999 copies (TOPY 003) and had the scratched message "Just Like Arcadia". High collector prices are paid for the original picture disc.

In 1986, the band re-released the album in a non-limited edition. The 1986 black vinyl unlimited edition (TOPY 017) had the scratched message "TOPY 017: for Alex".

Cleopatra Records re-released the album in 1994 as "Genesis P-Orridge & Psychic TV – Pagan Day", with a cover incorrectly noting the original release date as 25 December 1986 (CLEO94692).

Pagan Day and the related 1988 album Allegory and Self were re-released in 2017 by Sacred Bones Records and Dais Records.

== Reception ==
AllMusic described the album as "less extreme" than previous albums, writing "Song structure is observed, and Orridge and cohort Alex Fergusson keep a fairly tight rein on things. The 14 songs include two untitled fragments originally released as a seven-inch single with early copies of the album, and most of them have a clearly defined musical logic and progression. Fans of Psychic TV's more out-there work might find this distressingly restrained, but it's a remarkable performance nonetheless." Pitchfork, reviewing the 2017 re-issue noted that Pagan Day (1984) and Allegory and Self (1988) represent extremities in the early Psychic TV catalog—the former was once the rarest and rawest of their recordings, the latter was their most pop-oriented and commercially successful. But these two oppositional records share a significant amount of DNA".

== Temple Records releases ==
All tracks composed by Genesis P-Orridge and Alex Fergusson; except where indicated

=== Side One ===
1. "Cadaques"
2. "We Kiss"
3. "Opium"
4. "Cold Steel"
5. "L.A."
6. "Iceland"

=== Side Two ===
1. "Translucent Carriages" (Tom Rapp)
2. "Paris"
3. "Baby's Gone Away"
4. "Alice"
5. "New Sexuality"

== Cleopatra Records CD release ==
Pagan Day

Studio album
- Label: Cleopatra Records CD, CLEO 94692,1994

=== Track listing ===
1. Cadaques
2. We Kiss
3. Opium
4. Cold Steel
5. Lost Angeles
6. Iceland
7. Translucent Carriages
8. Paris
9. Baby's Gone Away
10. Alice
11. New Sexuality
12. Farewell

Bonus Tracks (listed on sticker on shrinkwrap only):

- As Tears Go By - originally issued on the "Live In Toronto" LP
- Unclean (Gen's mic mix) - previously unreleased
- Pirates - originally issued on the William S. Burroughs "Thee Films" VHS soundtrack
