= Holophonic =

Holophonic may refer to:

- Holophonics, a binaural recording system created by Hugo Zuccarelli
- Wave field synthesis, a spatial audio rendering technique, creating virtual acoustic environments
