= Evolver (The Grid album) =

Studio album by the Grid
- Released: 19 September 1994
- Recorded: 1993–1994
- Studio: Eastcote; Battery; (London, England)
- Length: 66:17
- Label: Deconstruction
- Producer: The Grid

The Grid chronology
456 (1992)	Evolver (1994)	Music for Dancing (1995)

Evolver is the third album by English electronic dance group the Grid, released on 19 September 1994 by Deconstruction Records. "Swamp Thing" is the best-known song from the album, becoming a dance club favourite and chart-hit in the UK, Europe and Australia. "Texas Cowboys" and "Rollercoaster" were also released as singles. Evolver reached number 14 on the UK Albums Chart.

== Critical reception ==
Professional ratings
Review scores
Source	Rating
AllMusic	2/5 stars
Melody Maker	(favorable)
Music Week	3/5 stars
NME	6/10
Smash Hits	4/5 stars

Paul Mathur from Melody Maker said, "Evolver is packed with potential incidental music for sporting highlights, but manages to cram in a heap of hitherto techno-unfriendly sounds just to further irritate those who believe in the sanctity of the dancefloor metronome." Alan Jones from Music Week noted, "The enormity of The Grid's 'Swamp Thing' (one of the year's 10 biggest sellers) and their cult status is such that this album will undoubtedly sell well, at least initially, but a little more adventurousness with their hybrid house/techno/trance style wouldn't have gone amiss."

Johnny Dee from NME wrote, "Like magicians conjuring white rabbits, doves and ham sandwiches from top hats into the foreign land of the theatre, The Grid's Evolver gameplan centres around their fantastic techno handbag and the ensuing merry cavalcade of a thousand comical wedding reception dances." Mark Frith from Smash Hits named it Best New Album, adding, "Best is a stunning track called 'Texas Cowboys' which is a frenetic hi-energy romp with Orb-type samples. Silver dreadlocks are going to be very big this autumn."

== Track listing ==
No.	Title	Length
1.	"Wake Up"	7:53
2.	"Rollercoaster"	6:34
3.	"Swamp Thing"	6:41
4.	"Throb"	5:04
5.	"Rise"	6:07
6.	"Shapes of Sleep"	6:44
7.	"Higher Peaks"	6:11
8.	"Texas Cowboys"	5:51
9.	"Spin Cycle"	5:31
10.	"Golden Dawn"	9:38

Note

- Although "Golden Dawn" is listed as being 9:38 long on the cover it is actually only approximately 7:21 long. After the music finishes there is one minute of silence followed by a hidden track at 8:21. This consists of a jocular message left on a telephone answering machine.

== Personnel ==
Adapted from the album's liner notes.

Additional musicians

- Pablo Cook – percussion (track 5)
- Roger Dinsdale – banjo (track 3)
- Robert Fripp – guitar (tracks 4, 6, 7)
- Donna Gardier – vocals (track 5)
- Alex Gifford – saxophone (track 1), synthesizer (tracks 4, 6, 9), piano (track 10)
- Susannah Melvoin – vocals (track 2), rhythmic vocals (track 7)
- Martyn Sharp – opera vocals (tracks 7, 10)

Technical

- The Grid – producer (all tracks)
- Ingo Vauk – recording engineer (all tracks), programming (all tracks); assisted by Lee, Richard, Tim & Jamie
- Philip Bagenal – recording engineer (tracks 4, 6, 9)
- Ren Swan – mix engineer (tracks 1–3, 5, 8)
- Chris Potter – mix engineer (tracks 4, 6, 7, 9, 10)
- Tony Cousins – mastering (all tracks)
- Richard Dowling – editing
- Andrew Sutton – album design
- Adrian Green – photography
- Mu Media – videography
- Recorded at Eastcote (all tracks) & Battery (tracks 4, 6, 7, 9, 10), London
- Mixed at Sarm East (tracks 1–3, 5, 8) & Metropolis (tracks 4, 6, 7, 9, 10), London

== Charts ==
Chart (1994)	Peak position
Australia (ARIA)	51
Hungarian Albums (MAHASZ)	37
Sweden (Sverigetopplistan)	27
Switzerland (Swiss Hitparade)	46
UK Albums (OCC)	14
