= Roman P =

1984 single by Psychic TV

Single by Psychic TV
- Released: 1984
- Label: Sordide Sentimental SS 33 009

"Roman P" is a song by Psychic TV about director Roman Polanski.

"Roman P." was first performed in nascent form during Psychic TV's 1983 gigs. This early version can be found on the live albums N.Y. Scum and Those Who Do Not. Of the many versions of the song, the best known is the "Fireball Mix" (from the Magickal Mystery D Tour EP), which was featured in a mid-1990s Volkswagen commercial, to the confusion of many fans.

== Single ==
The A-side of the original 7" single release features the "Short Version" of the titular song. The B-side, credited to Thee Temple Ov Psychick Youth and entitled "Neurology," contains a message from Mr. Sebastian, a spokesman for TOPY, as well as collaged speeches by Charles Manson and Jim Jones which run simultaneously in different stereo channels, and references to Sharon Tate. The B-side is double-grooved, which results in hearing either one of the two tracks when it is played from the start. The B-sides, the Fireball Mix, and the full-length recording of the original studio version of "Roman P" (which Sordide Sentimental previously released on the 1987 CD-Video Listen Today...), later appeared on the compilation CD Godstar: The Singles - Pt. Two.

The first edition was limited to 3003 numbered copies. There is a second edition of unknown unnumbered copies.

"Roman P" gave the band their first hit, reaching number 13 on the UK Independent Chart and staying on the chart for nine weeks.

== Track listing ==
Side A
Psychic TV (PTV): "Roman P (Short Version)"
Side B
Thee Temple Ov Psychick Youth (TOPY): "Neurology"
1. TOPY Spokesman (spelled "TOPY's Spokeman" on the single sleeve)
2a. Jim Jones (right)
2b. Charles Manson (left)

== Reissue with "Good Vibrations" ==
"Roman P" was re-issued as a double A-side in 1986 with a cover version of "Good Vibrations". The single reached number 48 on the UK Singles Chart and number 65 on the Billboard Hot 100.

== Covers ==
A version of this song was recorded by the electro-industrial band Asmodeus X on their album Morningstar.
