= The Magickal Mystery D Tour EP =

EP by Psychic TV
- Released: 1986
- Label: Temple Records

The Magickal Mystery D Tour EP is an EP by Psychic TV.

It charted in the UK Top 75 at No 65 on 20 September 1986.

== Track listing ==
=== Temple Records TOPY 023, 7" vinyl ===
Side A

1. "Good Vibrations"

Side B

1. "Roman P."

=== Temple Records TOPY 23T & TOPY 23 DJ, 12" vinyl ===
Side A

1. "Good Vibrations (Kundalini Mix)"
  - Co-producer - Ken Thomas
  - Mixed By - Phil Harding
2. "Hex-Sex (Voodoo Mix)"

Side B

1. "Roman P. (Fireball Mix)"
  - Co-producer - Ken Thomas
  - Mixed By - Mark Freegard
2. "Interzone"

=== Temple Records TOPY 23P & RCA Limited Australia and New Zealand 104611, 7" vinyl ===
Side A

1. "Good Vibrations"
  - Co-producer - Ken Thomas
2. "Interzone"

Side B

1. "Roman P."
  - Co-producer - Ken Thomas
2. "Hex-Sex"

=== Temple Records TOPY 23 D, 2x7" vinyl ===
Side "A"

1. "Good Vibrations"
  - Mixed By - Phil Harding
2. "Interzone"

Side "AA"

1. "Roman P."
  - Mixed By - Mark Freegard
2. "Hex-Sex"

Side "AAA"

1. "Godstar (Ugly Mix)"

Side "AAAA"

1. "Je T'aime (Menstrual Mix)"

== Charts ==
Chart (1986)	Peak position
UK Singles (OCC)	65
