= The Threshold HouseBoys Choir =

Musical project by Peter Christopherson

- Also known as: Peter Christopherson, Sleazy
- Genres: Industrial music Electronic music Post-industrial
- Instruments: Macintosh Computer; Synthesizers; Electronics
- Years active: 2005–2010

The Threshold HouseBoys Choir was a musical guise for Peter Christopherson, announced in 2005 as a follow-up endeavor to his former group Coil. Despite the name, it was a solo project which relied heavily on computer-generated vocals, of which he was formally credited as the "director". The name was derived from a play on words, combining the terms 'houseboy', 'house of boys', 'boys' choir' and 'Threshold House'. THBC was based in Bangkok, Thailand.

One of its last performances was held in 2008 at the historic Ambrosio Cinema in Turin, Italy. Christopherson (featuring David Tibet, Othon Mataragas and Ernesto Tomasini) performed a new live soundtrack to Derek Jarman's film The Angelic Conversation (the original score for the film was created in the 1980s by Coil).

The last performance of The Threshold HouseBoys Choir was on 14 June 2009, at Conway Hall, London as part of the Equinox Festival.

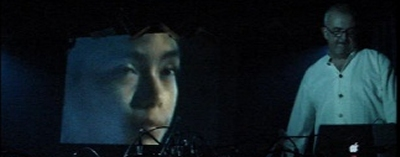
2005 Russian performance

== Releases ==
- Form Grows Rampant CD + DVD, released on 19 April 2007
- The Threshold HouseBoys Choir Amulet Edition 4 x 3" CD-R set, released on 22 November 2008

== Contributions on compilations ==
- ...It Just Is compilation CD released on 23 December 2005. Contained the track "Mahil Athal Nadrach".
- X-Rated: The Dark Files compilation CD released in 2006. Contained the track "So Young It Knows No Maturing".
- Brainwaves 2008 compilation triple CD released on 21 November 2008. Contained the track "Cap Rot Taxi".
