= Holophonics =

Binaural recording system

Holophonics is a binaural recording system created by Hugo Zuccarelli that is based on the claim that the human auditory system acts as an interferometer. It relies on phase variance, just like stereophonic sound. The sound characteristics of holophonics are most clearly heard through headphones, though they can be effectively demonstrated with two-channel stereo speakers, provided that they are phase-coherent. The word "holophonics" is related to "acoustic hologram".

== History ==
Holophonics was created by Argentine inventor Hugo Zuccarelli in 1980, during his studies at the Politecnico di Milano university. In 1983, Zuccarelli released a recording entitled Zuccarelli Holophonics (The Matchbox Shaker) in the United Kingdom (UK) that was produced by CBS. The recording consisted entirely of short recordings of sounds designed to show off the Holophonics system. These included a shaking matchbox, haircut and blower, bees, balloon, plastic bag, birds, airplanes, fireworks, thunder and racing cars. In its early years, Holophonics was used by various artists, including Pink Floyd for The Final Cut, Roger Waters solo album, The Pros and Cons of Hitch Hiking and Psychic TV's Dreams Less Sweet. The system has been used in film soundtracks, popular music, television and theme parks. Most famous sound effects were recorded in Modena at Umbi's Studios by sound engineer Maurizio Maggi. Holophonic is patented and registered by Umberto Maggi (Italy). Zuccarelli states that the human auditory system is a sound emitter, producing a reference sound that combines with incoming sound to form an interference pattern inside the ear. The nature of this pattern is sensitive to the direction of the incoming sound. According to the hypothesis, the cochlea detects and analyzes this pattern as if it were an acoustic hologram. The brain then interprets this data and infers the direction of the sound. An article from Zuccarelli presenting this theory was printed in the magazine New Scientist in 1983. This article was soon followed by two letters, casting doubt on Zuccarelli's theory and his scientific abilities.

To date, there has been no evidence provided that any acoustic emissions are used for sound localization. Holophonics, like binaural recording, instead reproduces the interaural differences (arrival time and amplitude between the ears), as well as rudimentary head-related transfer functions (HRTF). These create the illusion that sounds produced in the membrane of a speaker emanate from specific directions.

== Otoacoustic emissions ==
While otoacoustic emissions do exist, there is no evidence to support the assertion that these play a role in sound localization, nor is any mechanism for this "interference" effect claimed by Zuccarelli supported. On the contrary, there is abundant literature proving that properly presented spatial cues via head-related transfer functionHRTF synthesis (mimicking binaural heads) or binaural recording is adequate to reproduce realistic spatial recordings comparable to real listening, and comparable to the Holophonics demonstrations.

== Recordings released using holophonics ==
- Pink Floyd, The Final Cut Harvest/E.M.I, 7243 8 31242 2 0 (1983).
- Paul McCartney, "Keep Under Cover", 1983.
- Roger Waters, The Pros and Cons of Hitchhiking, Harvest, CDP 7 46029 2 (1984).
- Psychic TV, Dreams Less Sweet, Some Bizzare (1983).
