= Dreams Less Sweet =

Studio album by Psychic TV
- Released: 1983
- Recorded: February–March 1983
- Studio: Jacobs Studio, Farnham, Surrey; Hell Fire Club; Caxton Hall, London; Banks Farm, Essex; Sylvester Sports Centre, Hackney, London; Christ Church, Hampstead, London
- Genre: Avant-garde; industrial
- Length: 43:20
- Label: Some Bizzare
- Producer: Ken Thomas; Psychic TV

Psychic TV chronology
Force the Hand of Chance (1982)	Dreams Less Sweet (1983)	Those Who Do Not (1984)

Dreams Less Sweet is the second studio album by English experimental band Psychic TV, released in 1983. It was the last Psychic TV album to feature co-founder Peter "Sleazy" Christopherson.

== Recording ==
The album was recorded using Zuccarelli Holophonics technology, a binaural recording system optimized for headphone listening also used by Pink Floyd on The Final Cut. The band took advantage of the spatial effect (sometimes described as 3D) achieved by Holophonics to record in unusual locations like The Hellfire Club caves, Christ Church in Hampstead, and Caxton Hall.

"Always Is Always" is the Charles Manson composition also known as "Always Is Always Forever" and "I'll Never Say No to Always".

"White Nights" incorporates lyrics derived from the last sermon of cult leader Jim Jones.

The "Eden" suite incorporates a recording of body art pioneer Mr. Sebastian reassuring Psychic TV associate John Balance about a tattoo he is about to give him.

A demo version (with vocals by Fergusson) of "The Orchids", surfaced on 1984's Pagan Day under the title "Cold Steel".

== Release ==
It was released in 1983 by record label Some Bizzare. The album was released in Holophonic sound. Early copies came with a limited 12-inch EP, Thee Full Pack, containing additional unreleased tracks.

The cover is a photograph of an orchid with a ring inserted in the manner of a genital piercing.

In 2013 Angry Love Productions reissued Dreams Less Sweet as in a limited edition run of 1,000, 320 of which were pressed on red vinyl and also featured an extra CD with bonus material and a 12-page booklet with liner notes by Psychic TV's leader Genesis P-Orridge.

== Reception ==
Professional ratings
Review scores
Source	Rating
AllMusic	3/5 stars
Trouser Press	favourable

Trouser Press called it "another remarkable record, no less appealing for its equally abundant bizarrity. [...] PTV display an ineffable mastery of avant-garde dadaism as well as traditional musicmaking. Like tuning into a radio station overrun by university-educated acid-freaks, Dreams Less Sweet provides a thoroughly unpredictable and unsettling, yet profound, experience." Dreams Less Sweet, according to the Industrial People blog, "approaches the idea of an album with a unique formula. 'Force the Hand of Chance' was a song album. Most of its ten tracks follow a recognizable song structure, containing lyrics, enjoyable melodies and even the occasional verse/chorus/verse structure. 'Dreams Less Sweet' is more like a series of vignettes, sound sketches designed to set a mood or transport the listener to a place".

== Track listing ==
All tracks composed by Psychic TV; except where indicated

Side A
No.	Title	Writer(s)	Length
1.	"Hymn 23"	Thomas Tallis; arranged by Psychic TV
2.	"The Orchids"
3.	"Botanica"
4.	"Iron Glove"	lyrics: Monte Cazazza
5.	"Always Is Always"	Charles Manson
6.	"White Nights"
7.	"Finale"
8.	"Eleusis"
9.	"Medmenham"
10.	"Ancient Lights"
11.	"Proof on Survival"

Side B
No.	Title	Length
1.	"Eden 1"
2.	"Eden 2"
3.	"Eden 3"
4.	"Clouds Without Water"
5.	"Black Moon"
6.	"Silver and Gold"
7.	"In the Nursery"
8.	"Circle"

== Personnel ==
Psychic TV

- Peter Christopherson – emulator (synth), digital loops, bells, church organ, voice, production
- Alex Fergusson – guitar, bells, tambourine, voice, production
- Genesis P-Orridge – vocals, bass guitar, violin, emulator (synth), drums, kangling, Tibetan singing bells, production

Additional personnel

- Andrew Poppy – original choral and orchestral arrangements; emulator on "Hymn 23"
- Geff Rushton – bass guitar, vibraphone, kangling, Tibetan thigh bones, Tibetan singing bells
- Paula P-Orridge – drums, vibraphone, percussion
- David Tibet – kangling, bells, singing bowls
- Monte Cazazza – vocals and lyrics in "Iron Glove"
- Steve Broughton – Hammond organ on "White Nights"
- Micky Groome – harmony vocals on "White Nights"
- Bob Breen – backing vocals on "Ancient Lights"
- Mr. Sebastian – voice on "Eden 1"
- Dennis Guiver – voice on "Eden 3"
- Jeremy Birchill – bass vocals
- Anthony Scales – tenor vocals
- Rob Scales – tenor vocals
- Mark Lintern Harris – counter-tenor vocals and recorder
- Simon Limbrick – marimba, snare drums, percussion (temple blocks)
- Chris Redgate – oboe, English horn
- Jessica Ilbert – oboe, English horn
- Andy Calard – trumpet
- Bill Stokes – trumpet
- David Powell – tuba

Technical

- Ken Thomas – production
- Mike King – engineer
