= CoH (musician) =

- Birth name: Иван Павлов
- Also known as: Ivan Pavlov; Frankie Gothard
- Origin: Russia
- Genres: Glitch, industrial, IDM
- Website: http://www.post-pop.org

CoH is the musical alias of Ivan Pavlov (Russian: Иван Павлов), a Russian-born musician, sound artist and engineer. He has lived in Sweden since 1995. After moving to Sweden, he adopted the alias CoH which can be read in both the Cyrillic and Latin alphabets. It means sleep or dream in Russian. CoH worked with singer Annie Anxiety, with Cosey Fanni Tutti, with American artist Richard Chartier (under names Chessmachine and Nice Box) as well as with the British band Coil. Together with Peter Christopherson from Coil he launched the band Soisong in 2007.

== Discography ==
- Enter Tinnitus on CD (1998)
- Grain on CD (1999)
- Into Memories Of S-Tone. For Gavin Bryars on CD (1999)
- Vox Tinnitus on CD and 2X7" vinyl (1999)
- Iron on CD (2000)
- Love Uncut on CD (2000)
- Mask Of Birth on 12" vinyl (2000)
- Hide & Seek on mp3 (2001)
- Москве on CD (2002)
- Mask Of Birth on CD (2002)
- Mort Aux Vaches on CD (2002)
- Netmörk on CD (2002)
- Seasons on 2x12" (2002)
- Electric Electric on 12" vinyl (2003)
- 0397 Post-Pop on 2xCD (2005)
- Above Air on CD (2006)
- Patherns EP on CD (2006)
- Super Suprematism on CD (2007)
- Strings on 2xCD (2007)
- Plays Cosey on CD (2008)
- Dzerzhinsk-9 on 12" vinyl (2009)
- Z-Rated on CD (2010)
- IIRON on CD and vinyl (2011)
- Soisong EP on CD (2012)
- RETRO-2038 on CD and vinyl (2013)
- TO BEAT on CD (2014)
- TO BEAT OR NOT TO BEAT on 2xLP (2015)
- Return to Mechanics on 12" vinyl + CDr (2016)
- MUSIC VOL. on CD (2016)
- Plays Everall on Picture disc LP + CD (2017)
- DOMA on CD (2018)
- MUSIC VO on CD and vinyl (2020)
- Catnata Ariosa EP on CD (2020)

=== Compilation appearances ===
- "C Is For Sleep" on Interiors (1998)
- "Netmörk" on Emre (Dark Matter) (2000)
- "No Balance" on ...It Just Is (2005)
