= Soisong =

Background information
- Genres: Electronic music, experimental music
- Years active: 2007–2010
- Past members: Peter Christopherson; Ivan Pavlov

Soisong was a musical collaboration between Peter Christopherson and Ivan Pavlov (a.k.a. CoH). They released an EP and an album. Their website allows you to access a gallery of images of Peter, published upon his death, along with a password bar which provides access to various sections of the website by typing a password. The sections offer additional images or information on Soisong albums and live shows. All early Soisong CD releases have an octagonal shape, this was continued in packaging later on.

== Releases ==
- qXn94... CDEP / housed in a "disposable design" package wrap, which can not be re-used once broken (2008)
- xAj3z CD / housed in a fold out custom sleeve with colour inlay (2009)
- Soisong Split 2xEP CDEP (COH tracks) + free download from www.soisong.com (unreleased Sleazy material) (2012)
- Test Run #7 Bonobo Ltd Release CD / recording of the first live performance Test Run #7 in Bar Bonobo, Tokyo, sealed in a CD Player (2012)
- n36BwG7H or Soisong Blue CD / recording of the second live performance in Rovereto, Italy on 09.05.2008 (2021)
- h4u2bRLN or Soisong Orange CD / recording of the last live performance in Berlin, Germany on 05.06.2010 (without Sleazy) (2021)
- kAm1e or Soisong White CD / unfinished album recorded in Bangkok in 2007, mixed by Ivan Pavlov after Sleazy's death (2022)

== Live performances ==
- Test Run Tour 2008

09.03.2008 Bar Bonobo, Tokyo, Japan (TEST RUN #7)
09.05.2008 Futuro Presente Festival, Rovereto, Italy (SOISONG BLUE)
11.05.2008 Culture Box, Copenhagen, Denmark
17.05.2008 Guggenheim Museum, Bilbao, Spain
24.05.2008 Sugar Factory, Amsterdam, the Netherlands
28.05.2008 Club Ikra, Moscow, Russia
13.06.2008 Synch 2008 Festival, Athens, Greece

- Soisong Reunion Tour 2009

23.10.2009 OK Offenes Kulturhaus, Linz, Austria
29.10.2009 Club Ikra, Moscow, Russia
30.10.2009 A2, St. Petersburg, Russia
06.11.2009 Wroclaw Industrial Festival, Wroclaw, Poland
09.11.2009 Stadtgarten, Cologne, Germany

- Soisong Split Show 2010

05.06.2010 Hau 2 Hebbel am Ufer, Berlin, (without Peter Christopherson)
