= 456 (album) =

Studio album by The Grid
- Released: 1992
- Genre: House; Techno; Ambient house
- Length: 46:41
- Label: Virgin
- Producer: The Grid

The Grid chronology
Electric Head (1990)	456 (1992)	Evolver (1994)

456 (Four Five Six) is a music album by electronic artists The Grid which was released in 1992.

== Critical reception ==
Professional ratings
Review scores
Source	Rating
AllMusic	4/5 stars

== Track listing ==
All tracks composed by Dave Ball and Richard Norris; except where indicated

1. "Face the Sun" (Ball, Norris, Sun Ra) – 6:45
2. "Ice Machine" (Ball, Norris, Dieter Meier) – 3:45
3. "Crystal Clear" – 4:39
4. "Aquarium" – 6:07
5. "Instrument" – 0:31
6. "Heartbeat" – 4:41
7. "Oh Six One" – 0:09
8. "Figure of 8" – 5:31
9. "Boom!" – 4:14
10. "Leave Your Body" – 4:53
11. "Fire Engine Red" – 5:24

== Personnel ==
- Dave Ball - synthesizer, sampler, vocoder
- Richard Norris - drum machine, effects, machines, sampler

with:

- Sun Ra - vocals on "Face The Sun"
- Andrew "Sjaak" Duff - guitar break and solo on "Face The Sun"
- Dieter Meier - vocals on "Ice Machine"
- Zodiac Mindwarp - vocals on "Fire Engine Red"
- Robert Fripp - guitar on "Ice Machine" and "Fire Engine Red"
- Cobalt Stargazer, Rob Marche - guitar
- Alex Gifford - piano, Hammond organ
- Andy Mackay - saxophone, oboe
- Steve Sidelnyx - percussion
- Michele Oldland, P.P. Arnold, Dagmar Krause - backing vocals
- Malcolm Garrett, Norman Hathaway - sleeve design

== Charts ==
Chart performance for 456
Chart (1992)	Peak position
Australian Albums (ARIA)	199
