= Co La =

- Birth name: Matthew Papich
- Born: 1982-83; United States
- Genres: Pop, electronic, sound art, avant-rock
- Occupation(s): Musician, record producer, guitarist
- Instrument(s): Ableton Live, guitar
- Labels: Software

Matthew Papich (b. 1982–83) is an American electronic musician based in Baltimore who performs under the alias Co La. As Co La, he creates pop music created with loops on Ableton Live. He was also the guitarist in the avant-rock duo Ecstatic Sunshine. As a graduate of the Maryland Institute College of Art, Papaich is also an active art handler.

Co La's first releases were a number of cassettes issued in 2011, followed by Papaich's proper debut album Daydream Reporter, which incorporated styles of exotica, reggae and girl group music. 2013's Moody Coup was hailed by Pitchfork for being superior to other sound art music for "how naturally it comes together." His 2015 album No No, released on the label Software, applied field recordings to computer-programmed beats, resulting in what The Wire described as "[flittering] between the comical and the disturbing, as fragments of sound flow in and out of its sonic peripheries at an alarming rate."

== Discography ==
- Rest in Paradise (2011)
- Dial Tone Earth (2011)
- Daydream Reporter (2011)
- Moody Coup (2013)
- Hegemony of Delete (2014)
- No No (2015)
- Sensory Dub Example (2018)
