= Mr. Floppy's Flophouse =

Coordinates: 37.7893°N 122.2485°W

Mr. Floppy's Flophouse was a mansion on East 12th Street in East Oakland, Oakland, California, that at one time housed a bordello and saloon patronized by writer Jack London; in later years a picture of the writer was placed behind the elegant bar. In the early 1990s it was also the home to a well-known, wild underground party and rave. Mr. Floppy himself was said to be an elusive archeologist from Finland who, when not busy excavating an inverted pyramid thought to house the knowledge of all mankind, was hosting late night events in the bowels of one of Oakland's most notorious districts. In 2009, an intended party with the theme "Go Native" was shut down after protests from Native American communities in Texas from online social networks.

The flophouse had around 15-20 different rooms, with something different going on in each. In the main ballroom, DJ's and acts such as Psychic TV or Olli Wisdom would perform, while upstairs boasted any variety of acts ranging from a naked man playing sitar, to freestyle house, to a black light mushroom garden paradise.

At dawn it was not uncommon for George, the owner of the property, to appear in a wizard cape serving shrimp cups or noodle soups from behind his piano.
