= Paula P-Orridge =

British musician

Paula P-Orridge (born Paula Jean Brooking, 23 February 1963), also known as Alaura O'Dell, is a British interdisciplinary artist, musician, writer and entrepreneur.

== Life and career ==
Paula Brooking met musician and artist Genesis P-Orridge in 1979 while she was working as a Saturday girl (whilst she was also studying for her A-level exams for entrance into University to study Sociology) at Tesco supermarket in Hackney, East London.

=== 1980s ===
Genesis was a member of the band Throbbing Gristle. During a visit to Los Angeles in 1981 for the group's final shows, Paula married Genesis in Tijuana, Mexico. They had two daughters.

In 1982 Paula performed onstage with the band 23 Skidoo at some of their early gigs.

Paula joined Genesis' second band Psychic TV in 1983, playing drums and creating sound collages. A photograph of her appears on the cover of group's first single "Just Drifting", which originated as a love song written for her by Genesis. Paula also performed as part of Psychic TV at their first full concert at The Ritz in Manchester in 1983 and she is credited as playing drums, vibraphone and percussion on the group's second album Dreams Less Sweet which was released in the same year.

Paula ran the mail order section of Temple Records and sometimes acted as Psychic TV's tour manager and record company liaison. She also wrote the liner notes for Psychic TV releases including the Live In Toronto album and 8 Transmissions 8 video compilation.

Paula and her eldest daughter Caresse are depicted in the 1985 collage artwork by Helen Chadwick entitled One Flesh, which is part of the collection at the V&A Museum.

From 1988 she adopted the Mistress Mix alias for rave and acid house releases, including tracks on the Tekno Acid Beat compilation album.

In 1989 Paula was featured extensively in the RE/Search book Modern Primitives discussing body modification, piercings and tattoos.

=== 1990s ===
"We still occasionally get people at our shows who are sort of holdovers from Industrial music. And they don't really understand what we're doing. [...] But we're going into the future, not back into the past. And we're really attracting the audience that we want, people who dance and move. And smile. They understand what we're saying, which is 'Enjoy yourself. Be happy. Enjoy your body. Enjoy your brain and your thoughts.' And what really makes me optimistic now is I see people come along and they have Throbbing Gristle tee-shirts on. And I think, 'Oh No.' But they start dancing and they get into it."

In the early 1990s, Paula and Genesis left the United Kingdom to live in Nepal and the United States in a self-imposed exile. In late 1992 the couple divorced and her involvement with Psychic TV ceased. Following their separation, Genesis removed Paula's credits from reissues of Psychic TV material.

In December 1994 while in the United States, Paula recorded a solo ambient music and spoken word album, Sacred Dreams, in collaboration with Justin Beck, a Californian electronica artist. The album was released in 1995 on the San Francisco-based record label, Silent Records. Sacred Dreams differed significantly from her previous work and she released the album under her new name of Alaura O'Dell. This album marked the debut of her interest in new-age mysticism. Sacred Dreams was subsequently re-released on Sanctioned Records as an mp3.

During this period she also provided soundscapes for public readings by Timothy Leary on the West Coast of the USA.

To complement her interest in New Age Goddess worship, in 1996 Paula P-Orridge/ Alaura O'Dell established an independent, niche travel company, Sacred Journeys for Womyn. The company offers educational, experiential and healing tours exclusively to women, visiting sites of significance revered for a tradition of Goddess worship.

=== 21st century ===
In 2023, Alaura was quoted extensively in Wesley Doyle's book Conform To Deform: The Weird & Wonderful World of Some Bizzare, reflecting on her experiences with this record label in the early 1980s. In September 2023 an exhibition of O'Dell's "archive and artefacts" was held in Yucca Valley, California.

In 2025 it was announced that Alaura would be performing her first Mistress Mix show for many years at the Gray Area venue in San Francisco.

== Discography ==
=== Major works with Psychic TV ===
Albums

- Themes (LP) (1982)
- Dreams Less Sweet (LP, cassette) (1983)
- Those Who Do Not (2x12") (1984)
- Mouth of the Night (CD, LP, 12" picture disc) (1985)
- Themes 2 (LP) (1985)
- Allegory and Self (CD, LP, 12" picture disc) (1988)
- Jack the Tab – Acid Tablets Volume One (CD, LP, 12" picture disc) (1988)
- Tekno Acid Beat (CD, LP) (1988)
- Towards Thee Infinite Beat (CD, 12", cassette) (1990)
- Beyond Thee Infinite Beat (CD, 2x12", cassette) (1990)
- Ultrahouse (The L.A. Connection) (CD, cassette) (1991)

Singles

- "Unclean" 12" (Temple Records, 1984)
- "Roman P" 7" (Sordide Sentimental, 1984)
- Psychic TV and The Angels Of Light - "Godstar" 7", 12", picture disc, etc (Temple Records, 1985)
- Mistress Mix & Psychic TV - "Je T'Aime" 12" (Temple Records, 1989)

=== Solo ===
- Alaura - Sacred Dreams (Silent, 1995)
- The Electronica Sound of Sonoma County Northern California Vol. 1 (Sanctioned Records, 2006) - compilation album including Alaura track "Magik".
