= Doppelgänger (The Grid album) =

Studio album by The Grid
- Released: 24 March 2008
- Recorded: 2007
- Studio: Elephant Studios, Wapping, London; Castle Studios, Lewes
- Genre: Techno, house, electronica
- Label: Some Bizzare
- Producer: The Grid

The Grid chronology
Music for Dancing (1995)	Doppelgänger (2008)

Doppelgänger is the fourth studio album by The Grid, released in 2008, after a break of more than ten years. Guest artists include Robert Fripp on "Mighty Heroik" and Chris Braide on "Closer", "Be Here With You", "Fools Rush In" and "Feed Your Mind". The album was reissued by One Little Indian in 2017.

== Track listing ==
All tracks composed by The Grid (Dave Ball and Richard Norris); except where noted.

No.	Title	Length
1.	"8 Miles from Memphis"	4:49
2.	"Vibration"	3:38
3.	"Pleasure Control"	5:13
4.	"Put Your Hands Together"	5:23
5.	"Slinker" (The Passions)	4:48
6.	"Pure Statik"	4:18
7.	"Mighty Heroik"	4:58
8.	"Saturday"	5:42
9.	"Closer"	4:18
10.	"Three Floors Above You"	3:42
11.	"Feed Your Mind"	5:40
12.	"Fools Rush In"	4:07
13.	"Be Here with You"	4:35
Total length:		66:11
