= Force the Hand of Chance =

1982 studio album by Psychic TV

Studio album by Psychic TV
- Released: 1982
- Recorded: 1982
- Genre: Post-punk, psychedelic rock, avant-garde, experimental
- Length: 47:01
- Label: Some Bizzare
- Producer: Ken Thomas; Psychic TV

Psychic TV chronology
Force the Hand of Chance (1982)	Themes (1982)

Singles from Force the Hand of Chance
- 1. "Just Drifting" Released: 1982

Themes

Studio album by Psychic TV
- Released: 1982
- Recorded: 1982
- Label: Some Bizzare

Psychic TV chronology
Force the Hand of Chance (1982)	Themes (1982)	Dreams Less Sweet (1983)

Alternate cover
- Themes Part 1 Cleopatra Records re-issue cover.

Force the Hand of Chance is the debut studio album by English experimental group Psychic TV, released in 1982 by record label Some Bizzare. The first 5,000 pressings came with a bonus album, Themes.

A single, "Just Drifting", was released from the album.

== Release ==
The album has a complex reissue history. In 1994, the Tempus Records label issued it on CD. Tempus retitled it Force Thee Hands ov Chants, packaged it with a completely different cover design (P-Orridge's 1980's collage "Twisted"), and credited it to Genesis P-Orridge and Psychic TV. The Tempus edition includes four bonus tracks and a second CD titled Blinded Eye in the Pyramids featuring music created by Genesis P-Orridge and Fred Giannelli in 1988.

It was again issued on CD by Cleopatra Records in 1995 with a different cover, bonus tracks taken from the Just Drifting 12-inch (the 7-inch B-side was not included) and the bonus 12-inch from the Dreams Less Sweet album, but missing all of the Themes LP. The sound quality was very poor and some tracks were remixed. A later reissue by Some Bizzare spread the same material (with the same flawed mastering) over two discs. A 2-CD set of the complete original 2-LP set was issued by WEA Japan.

The Themes LP has been issued on CD separately, first by Syard Records under the title Cold Dark Matter, remixed from the original master tapes and with an extra 3-minute spoken word coda added, then by Cleopatra Records under the title Themes Part One, mastered from an extremely noisy vinyl source, then by Syard Records yet again with a new cover and liner notes (identical audio to their initial release) and, most recently, by Cold Spring on their 7-CD Themes box set, remastered from the original tapes (original mix), but not including the coda from the Cold Dark Matter edition.

== Reception ==
Professional ratings
Review scores
Source	Rating
AllMusic	4/5 stars
Head Heritage	favourable
Trouser Press	generally favourable

Ned Raggett of AllMusic wrote "The first Psychic TV album in many ways remains its best". Trouser Press wrote "Force the Hand of Chance, regardless of its sincerity or utter lack thereof, is an amazing package [...] Musically, the main disc is a weird assortment of quiet ballads, screeching white noise, simple pop and more, with lyrics by P-Orridge that drift over terrain not all in keeping with the mystical concept. At times, form far outweighs function and some songs become merely effect without substance; others stand up nicely on their own regardless of the accompanying baggage. The adjunct record, Psychick TV Themes, uses real and imagined ethnic instruments from various exotic cultures to produce instrumentals that range from crazed to cool, intense to ephemeral". Head Heritage described it as "one of the two or three crucial PTV recordings".

== Track listing ==
=== Original release ===
All lyrics are written by Genesis P-Orridge; all music is composed by Psychic TV (Peter Christopherson, Alex Fergusson and P-Orridge).

Side A
No.	Title	Length
1.	"Just Drifting"	3:40
2.	"Terminus"	13:19
3.	"Stolen Kisses"	3:51
4.	"Caresse"	2:13

Side B
No.	Title	Length
1.	"Guiltless"	8:47
2.	"No Go Go"	3:47
3.	"Ov Power"	6:21
4.	"Message from the Temple"	5:03

Side C: Themes (first 5,000 pressings)
No.	Title	Length
1.	"Part I. Piano and Clarinet."	7:35
2.	"Part II. 23 Tibetan Human Thigh Bones."	5:55
3.	"Part III. Cowbell, Bicycle Wheels and Vibes"

Side D
No.	Title	Length
1.	"Part IV. New Guinea Headhunters Pipe, Large and Small Drum."
2.	"Part V. Piano and String Machine."
3.	"Part VI. Recording made at Jonestown, Guyana at the Time of the Suicides."
4.	"Part VII. African Initiation Drum and Animal Tusk Horn."
5.	"Part VIII. Various Temple Bells, Gongs, Cymbals and Vibes."

=== 1994 CD version ===
CD 1: Force Thee Hands ov Chants
No.	Title	Length
1.	"Just Drifting (for Caresse)"
2.	"Terminus-Xtul (for Robert De Grimston)"
3.	"Stolen Kisses"
4.	"Caresse"
5.	"Guiltless (for The Process)"
6.	"No Go Go"
7.	"Ov Power"
8.	"Message from Thee Temple"
9.	"Thee Full Pack (for Bachir Attar)" (bonus track)
10.	"The Mad Organist" (bonus track)
11.	"Just Drifting (Midnight)" (bonus track)
12.	"Bubbles" (bonus track)
13.	""?"" (bonus track)

Track 13 is related to the 1993-1995 concept album project The Process by Skinny Puppy.

CD 2: Blinded Eye in Thee Pyramids
No.	Title	Length
1.	"Yes/Hello/Bliss"
2.	"Thee Infinite Beat"
3.	"Forced S.M.I.L.E."
4.	"Temptation/Let's Make Love"
5.	"Goddess-Priestess-Endless"
6.	"Blinded Eye in Thee Pyramids"
7.	"Are You X-Spear Incense?"

CD 2: All lyrics written/improvised by Genesis P-Orridge. All music written by Fred Giannelli and Genesis P-Orridge. Special guest on tracks 1 and 7, Bachir Attar, Master Musician of Jajouka.

== Personnel ==
Psychic TV

- Peter Christopherson – keyboards, electronic percussion, tubular bells, vocals, production
- Alex Fergusson – lead, bass and acoustic guitars, tambourine, vocals, production
- Genesis P-Orridge – vocals, keyboards, real percussion, bass guitar, production

Additional personnel

- David Tibet, Paula P-Orridge, Stan Bingo – instruments
- Kenny Wellington and Claude Deppa – brass on "Ov Power"
- Marc Almond – vocals on "Guiltless" and "Stolen Kisses"
- Mr Sebastian – vocals on "Message from the Temple"
- Andrew Poppy – string arrangements and conductor

Technical

- Ken Thomas – production, engineering
- Craig Milliner – additional engineering
- Neville Brody – artwork
