= Hell Is Invisible... Heaven Is Her/e =

Hell is Invisible... Heaven is Her/e

Studio album by Psychic TV
- Released: 9 June 2007
- Genre: Post-punk, psychedelic rock, experimental rock, punk rock, electronic rock
- Length: 73:57
- Label: Sweet Nothing
- Producer: Edward O'Dowd, Baba Larraji, Genesis P-Orridge

Psychic TV chronology
Trip Reset (1996)	Hell is Invisible... Heaven is Her/e (2007)	Mr. Alien Brain vs. the Skinwalkers (2008)

Professional ratings
Review scores
Source	Rating
AllMusic	3.5/5 stars
PopMatters	4/10 stars

Hell Is Invisible... Heaven Is Her/e is the 2007 album by counter-cultural provocateur Genesis P-Orridge and the reactivated Psychic TV a.k.a. “PTV3”. This line-up had been active for the previous two years and much of the material on the album developed from ideas that emerged during PTV3's extensive touring in North America and Europe. The album was produced by Edward O'Dowd, Baba Larraji and Genesis P-Orridge.

Special guests were invited to add finishing flourishes: the Yeah Yeah Yeahs' Nick Zinner contributes his distinctive guitar playing to "In Thee Body" and "Maximum Swing", the Butthole Surfers' Gibby Haynes adds vocals to "Maximum Swing" and "I Don't Think So" and author Douglas Rushkoff — the original keyboardist for PTV3 — plays on "Lies and Then".

Whilst this album is not a concept album or a musical play per se it does centre on a more or less chronological journey through death to resurrection of the physical body and through confusion via revelation to spiritual epiphany.

== Track listing ==
1. "Higher And Higher" – 6:20
2. "In Thee Body" – 6:55
3. "Lies And Then" – 5:15
4. "Maximum Swing" – 5:55
5. "New York Story" – 6:32
6. "I Don't Think So" – 9:23
7. "Hookah Chalice" – 9:33
8. "Just Because" – 10:15
9. "Bb" – 6:31
10. "Milk Baba" – 7:18
