= Richard Norris (musician) =

- Born: Richard Graham Thomas Norris; 23 June 1965 (age 61)
- Occupations: Record producer; DJ; musician; sound engineer; author
- Years active: 1979–present

Richard Norris (born 23 June 1965) is a London-based record producer, songwriter, sound engineer, musician, DJ and author. He is best known as a member of electronic dance band The Grid. Norris has also worked as a producer and engineer since the '80s with artists such as Genesis Breyer P-Orridge, Marc Almond and Joe Strummer.

Norris began making music as a teenage member of St. Albans punk band Innocent Vicars. Vicars recorded two singles in 1980: "Antimatter" and "Funky Town" for the independent No Brain Records. Norris started working in the music industry as the label manager for the British psychedelic record label Bam Caruso before becoming a writer for NME in 1987.

== Bands ==
=== The Grid ===
Norris and David Ball collaborated together as M.E.S.H, one of the groups formed by Psychic TV members for the fake compilation Jack The Tab – Acid Tablets Volume One in 1988. They released their track, Meet Every Situation Head On, as a single.

They then changed their name to The Grid and signed to Warner Bros Records/East West Records the same year. The Grid had six Top 40 UK Singles Chart hits between 1990 and 1995 including: "Floatation", "Crystal Clear", "Texas Cowboys", "Rollercoaster" and the million-selling "Swamp Thing." "Swamp Thing" reached no.3 in the UK charts and was Top Ten in nine other countries. It was certified a Silver Disc.

The Grid has been in existence from their formation in 1988 until the present day with a 5-year hiatus between 1998-2003. During the break, Norris formed the band The Droyds and under that name mixed tracks for Armand Van Helden and Siobhan Fahey.

The Grid have released five albums (as of 2018).

=== Beyond The Wizard's Sleeve ===
Along with British DJ Erol Alkan Norris formed the remix/DJ duo Beyond the Wizard's Sleeve. Under this name Norris and Alkan initially released four remix/re-edit EPs: "Birth", "Spring", "George" and "West", followed by several singles. In 2016 they released their debut album The Soft Bounce which was rated album of the week by The Guardian's music critic Alex Petridis

Beyond the Wizard's Sleeve have also remixed The Chemical Brothers, Tracey Thorn, Badly Drawn Boy, Midlake and Goldfrapp. Their own compilation of other band remixes: Reanimations Volume One, was released in 2009. Norris has also compiled the techno compilation album Flux Trax.

Norris formed the electronic band Circle Sky with DJ Martin Dubka. Circle Sky remixed a number of artists including: Yello, Jagwar Ma, and Imarhan.

=== The Time & Space Machine ===
Norris formed a new project in 2009 called The Time and Space Machine. The Time and Space Machine signed to Tirk Records in 2009 and released a 7" single "Children of the Sun," an EP You Are The One, and an album Set Phazer to Stun. A second Time and Space Machine album Taste the Lazer was released in 2012.

A The Time and Space Machine remix collection The Way Out Sound From In was released in 2015. This featured remixes of: Warpaint, Jagwar Ma and Temples.

The band also collaborated with designer Luke Insect and the street wear label Stüssy to create a series of Time and Space Machine Stüssy T-shirts.

== Collaborations ==
=== Joe Strummer ===
Norris was also a friend of Joe Strummer and the two worked together on the soundtrack for Grosse Pointe Blank. Norris later appeared on The Mescaleros debut album Rock Art and the X-Ray Style co-writing and producing tracks: "Sandpaper Blues" and "Yalla Yalla."

=== Psychic TV ===
Norris and Genesis P-Orridge of Psychic TV collaborated to release two fake compilations of acid house songs in 1988—contributing to each under variety of aliases such as: DJ Doktor Megatrip and Mista Luv. The two albums Jack the Tab and Tekno Acid Beat were released with the intention to fool people into believing that the genre had already taken off in Britain—thereby encouraging its popularization and acceptance.

Jack the Tab also features Soft Cell's David Ball and was notable for sampling dialogue from the film The Wild Angels - We Want to be free! We want to do what we want to do! - two years before it was used by Primal Scream in their Top 20 hit "Loaded."

=== Moog ===
Moog Music—contemporary makers of the famous Moog synthesisers—constructed a bespoke sound lab for the creation of live synthesised music as an open access, experimental music resource to celebrate the life and work of electronics inventor Dr. Robert Moog in 2015. The Grid were the first band to be invited to play and record in the new studio at the Sound Lab at The Institute of Sound Recording (Surrey University) three years later. The resulting work was a 6-track album called One Way Traffic. The other albums—making up a series of three were: Hieroglyphic Being's The Replicant Dream Sequence and the late Mika Vainio's Lydspor One & Two. The Guardian's music critic described the event as: 'The synth revival; why the Moog is back in vogue' commenting: 'Both Grid members are bona fide synth pioneers.'

=== Robert Fripp ===
The Grid collaborated with the King Crimson guitarist Robert Fripp on the Grid album 456. The Grid also remixed David Sylvian and Robert Fripp's track "Darshan (1993)" and released the previously unheard Grid/Fripp collaboration "A Cabala Sky" in 2014

=== Finnur Bjarnasson ===
Norris collaborated with classically trained Icelandic opera singer Finnur Bjarnasson on a music project called Restoration under the band name The Long Now. It was released on Curved Space Records in 2018 .

== Remixes ==
Norris has been remixing music since the eighties and has worked with artists including: Soft Cell, Psychic TV, Black Grape, Space, Yello, Shakespears Sister, Armand Van Helden, Lambchop, Joe Strummer, Cornershop, Saint Etienne, Marc Almond, Momus and Mylène Farmer.

Norris remixed former The Verve singer Richard Ashcroft's "Out of my Body" Flamingods "Mixed Blessings" and Mary Epworth's "Me Swimming" in 2017.

== Festivals ==
The Lewes Psychedelic Festival in Lewes, south England was founded by Norris and Chris Tomsett in 2009. The ongoing festival is still curated by Tomsett (as of 2018)--hosting in the past bands such as: The Notorious Hi-Fi Killers, Voice of the Seven Thunders, The Sound Carriers and Norris's own The Time & Space Machine.

Norris regularly DJs at UK festivals including Glastonbury and the Green Man Festival

== Soundtracks ==
Norris's bands and songs have appeared in several feature films, television shows and documentaries:

- Grosse Point Blank (song "War Cry")
- Pecker (song "Swamp Thing")
- Let's Rock Again! (song "Yalla Yalla")
- My Mad Fat Diary ("England's Irie")
- Everybody Street
- Viva Joe Strummer (personal appearance)

== Author ==
Norris was the official biographer of Paul Oakenfold and the writer of Paul Oakenfold: The Authorized Biography in 2007.

His memoir, Strange Things Are Happening, is scheduled to be released April 25, 2024.
