= The Leather Nun =

Swedish rock band

Background information
- Also known as: Lädernunnan
- Origin: Gothenburg, Sweden
- Genres: Post-punk, industrial, garage rock, gothic rock, pop rock
- Years active: 1978–1995, 2014–present
- Labels: Industrial, Wire, Wild Kingdom
- Members: Jonas Almquist
- Past members: Jonas Almqvist; Bengt Aronsson; Freddie Wadling; Gert Claesson; Nils Wohlrabe; Ulf Widlund

The Leather Nun, also known as Lädernunnan, is a Swedish rock band. The band was formed in 1979 in Gothenburg by Jonas Almquist (vocals, guitar) to record a b-side to a single for the English record label Industrial Records. He recruited Bengt "Aron" Aronsson (guitar), Freddie Wadling (bass) and Gert Claesson (drums). Wadling, Aronsson and Claesson had already played together in Straitjacket, a band that had split up due to disagreements.

== History ==
The Leather Nun (a.k.a. Swedish: Lädernunnan) was formed in 1978 in Gothenburg, Sweden by radio DJ and fanzine editor Jonas Almquist (vocals) who, after getting agreement from Genesis P. Orridge to release a single on the Industrial Records label, recruited Bengt "Aron" Aronsson (guitar), Freddie Wadling (bass) and Gert Claesson (drums), all from punk band Strait Jacket.

Inspired by Velvet Underground and Lou Reed, Iggy Pop and Rory Gallagher, The Leather Nun released the debut EP, Slow Death in November 1979, featuring three newly recorded songs and the recording of "Death Threats" from 1978. John Peel played the title song each night for two weeks on his BBC radio programme.

Although many people think so, Jonas Almquist says the band did not take their name from the American underground comic Tales from the Leather Nun. He also tells that it was not taken from the stage name of a London stripper, but chosen because "it felt just as a clockwork name for a band who based its music on the dynamics between the pure innocent and the black shameful ...".

In the early 1980s, the band soon attracted controversy by showing adult movies as part of their live shows and often shocked some audiences by being accompanied by strippers when on stage and over their use of hard-core gay pornography. A handful of singles followed before The Leather Nun released their first LP, Alive in 1985, a live album recorded in Denmark.

Covering ABBA's "Gimme, Gimme, Gimme" earned the group respect in Sweden and Europe and was performed live on the UK Channel 4 all-night tv-show Euro Tube in June 1986. Several successful tours followed. Meanwhile, the group's imported singles found their way onto US college radio stations, earning airplay with "Pink House", a deadpan mockery of John Mellencamp's "Pink Houses". It also appeared on the Mini-LP Lust Games, which was only released in the UK and reached number 5 in the UK Indie Chart.

In 1987 the group released the top-selling compilation LP Force of Habit (consisting of the handful of singles plus other tracks from Lust Games), first in the US, adorned with a controversial cover shot by photographer Mick Rock. Also in 1987 "Jesus Came Driving Along" appeared in the soundtrack of the film Dudes and gained them more airplay and success.

1987 saw the release, but only in the EU, of their second studio album, Steel Construction, which was critically acclaimed and also reached No. 5 in the UK Indie Chart.

In 1988 The Leather Nun were reviewed in Rolling Stone and quoted to be the first rock act to sell condoms as tour merchandise. It was during a sold-out Leather Nun-show at the Scream club in Los Angeles, that The Cult-vocalist Ian Astbury (major Leather Nun-fan) met with Swedish Leather Nun-fan and to-be video director Jonas Åkerlund (Madonna, The Prodigy, Metallica, Lady Gaga) and forming a long-standing friendship. Jonas Åkerlund used music by The Leather Nun in his debut movie Spun feat Mickey Rourke.

In August 1988 the band played at the 'Glasnost Rock' festival in Tallinn, Estonia, the first international rock festival to be staged in the Soviet Union, together with amongst others Big Country and PiL.

Their third studio album, International Heroes, was produced by Kim Fowley and was released in 1990, again only in Europa! While releasing their fourth studio album Nun Permanent (produced by Mick Ronson) in winter 1991, their record company went bankrupt and could no longer deliver copies of the album. Being without a record company The Leather Nun continued to play gigs for a few years, but never got so successful again. The group finally broke up in 1995, but has reunited on some occasions since then. In 2005 they had a short comeback, but did not release any new albums.

Commemorating the 30th Anniversary of Leather Nun, Jonas Almquist formed a tribute band in 2009 with celeb Swedish rock musicians (amongst them guitarist Thomas Silver of Hardcore Superstar), under the name Leather Nun: Reloaded. In native Gothenburg on 12 September 2009 they played their last live gig, with guest appearances by original Leather Nun-members. Jonas Almquist then focused on his new band project Godtherapy, releasing the sold-out limited edition debut cd ... and there will be Godtherapy in the summer of 2010.

In late 2013, they finally got the rights of the back catalogue and the use of the band name 'The Leather Nun' back and started recording a new album, which was released in 2015 and titled Whatever, plus a live album (with a cover shot by Lou Reed) followed, and finally after 28 years, the live concert in the U.S.S.R. could be released.

Leather Nun has been cited a major influence by European, British and US bands of the punk and post-punk era. Leather Nun songs have been covered by countless bands, amongst them the Butthole Surfers, Turbonegro and Mudhoney. Mark Lanegan (QOTSA et al) claims the compilation album Force of Habit is one of the albums that changed his life, and stated "I know that everything I have done since I heard this record has a piece of this album in it. It's a huge influence on me."

== Members ==
- Jonas Almquist – vocals
- Bengt Aronsson – guitar
- Gert Claesson – drums
- Freddie Wadling – bass (original bass-player, 1979–83)

Touring musicians:

- Ulf Widlund – bass
- Svävarn – bass
- Apis – bass
- Stefan Bellnäs – bass
- Michael Krönlein – bass
- Nils Wohlrabe – guitar
- Frederik Adlers – piano/keyboards/producer/arranger
- Pelle Blom – piano/keyboards
- Kalle Stintzing – piano/keyboards
- Martin Hederos – piano/keyboards
- Jeff Virgo – bass
- Staffan Brodén - Drums

== Discography ==
=== Albums ===
Studio

- Lust Games (1986), Wire – 12-inch Mini-LP, UK Indie no. 5
- Steel Construction (1987), Wire – LP/CD, UK Indie no. 5
- International Heroes (1990), Wire – LP/CD
- Nun Permanent (1991), Wire/Rough Trade – LP/CD
- Whatever (2015), Wild Kingdom/Sound Pollution – LP/CD/download, Swedish vinyl chart no. 1

Live

- At Scala Cinema, London / Music Palais Kungsgatan (1980), Industrial – cassette
- Alive (1985), Wire Records – LP
- Vive la Fête! Vive La Révolution! (2016), Wild Kingdom – LP/CD, Recorded live in Tallinn, Estonia/U.S.S.R. Aug 26th 1988
- Live (2016), Wild Kingdom – LP

Compilations

- Slow Death, Extended Version re-release (1984), Criminal Damage – Mini-LP
- Force Of Habit (1987), Wire – LP
- A Seedy Compilation (1994), MVG/SPV – CD

=== Singles and EPs ===
- "Slow Death EP" (1979), Industrial – 7-inch EP, UK Indie no. 26 and Germany's Musik Express Alternative Charts no. 1
- "Ensam i Natt" (1982), Sista Bussen – 7-inch single (released under the Swedish name Lädernunnan)
- "Prime Mover" (1983), Scabri/Subterranean – 7-inch single, reissued in 1984 and 1986 on 12-inch single, UK Indie no. 22
- "506" (1985), Wire – 7-inch/12-inch single
- "Desolation Ave" (1985), Wire – 7-inch/12-inch single, UK Indie no. 20
- "Gimme Gimme Gimme!" (1986), Wire – 7-inch/12-inch single, UK Indie no. 16
- "Gimme Gimme Gimme! (The Rejected Version)" (1986), Wire – 12-inch single
- "Pink House" (1986), Wire – 7-inch/12-inch single, UK Indie no. 12
- "Lust for Love" (Live) (1987) – 7-inch flexi disc with Bucketfull of Brains magazine
- "I Can Smell Your Thoughts" (1987), Wire – 7-inch/12-inch single, UK Indie no. 25
- "Cool Shoes" (1987), Wire – 7-inch/12-inch single, UK Indie no. 17
- "Lost and Found" (1987), Wire – 7-inch/12-inch single, UK Indie no. 35
- "Pink House (Special 1988 Mix)" (1987), IRS – 12-inch single, Promo only
- "I Can Smell Your Thoughts" (2 Remixes) (1988), IRS – 12-inch single, Promo only
- "Radio One Sessions: The Evening Show" (1988) (1986 July 13 BBC Session), Strange Fruit – 12-inch EP
- "Demolition Love" (1988), Wire – 7-inch/12-inch single
- "A Thousand Nights" (1989), Wire – 7-inch/12-inch single
- "Ride Into Your Town" (1990), Wire – 7-inch/12-inch single
- "Girls" (1991), Wire – 7-inch/CD single
- "Save My Soul" (1994), MVG – CD single, Promo only

=== Compilation appearances ===
- The Industrial Records Story (1984), Illuminated: "Slow Death"
- Backlash! (Original Film Soundtrack) (1985), Criminal Damage: "No Rule"
- No Rules (1986), Conifer: "No Rules", "Slow Death"
- Dudes – The Original Motion Picture Soundtrack Album (1987), MCA: "Jesus Came Driving Along"
- Sounds Showcase 3 (1987), 7-inch EP: "Jesus Came Driving Along" (live version)
- Muzak Distortion (1988), Musikdistribution: "Lost and Found"
- Indie Top 20 Volume III – War of Independents (1988), Beachwood: "Lost and Found"
- Song and Legend (1988), Abstract Sounds: "Prime Mover"
- Sweden 88 (1988), InfoGram: "Someone Special Like You (Edit)"
- Tapped (1988), Wire: "I Can Smell Your Thoughts (US Mix)", "Desolation Avenue"
- The Best of the Radio 1 Sessions Vol. One (1989), Nighttracks: "Pure Heart"
- Radio Ffn Powerstation (1990), SPV: "506"
- Big Deal! (1990), Sista Bussen: "No Rule", "Ensam i Natt"
- GBG Punk volym 2 (1993), Nonstop: "Ensam i Natt"
- Ny Våg 78-82 (1993), MNW: "No Rule"
- Back To Front Vol. 5 (1994), Incognito: "Ensam i Natt"
- Fi-Fi Dong – A Gasolin Tribute (1995), Columbia: "Fi-Fi Dong"
- Spirit of the 80's (1996), Facedown: "I Can Smell Your Thoughts"
- Voll auf die Zehn! (1997), Public Propoaganda: "Cool Shoes"
- Svenska Punk Klassiker (2003), MNW: "Ensam i Natt"
- Abba Forever (2004), Polystar: "Gimme Gimme Gimme"
- Svensk Postpunk (2007), MNW: "Gimme Gimme Gimme"
- New Wave Club Class•X – Sinner's Day 11 (2011), EMI: "Gimme Gimme Gimme"
- Too Old to Die Young soundtrack (2019), Amazon Content Services: "F.F.A"
