= Alienist (album) =

Studio album by Psychic TV
- Released: 16 September 2016
- Genre: Psychedelic rock, space rock, acid rock
- Length: 34:26
- Label: Dais Records; Angry Love Production
- Producer: Edward O’Dowd; Jeff Berner

Psychic TV chronology
Snakes (2014)	Alienist (2016)

Professional ratings
Review scores
Source	Rating
AllMusic	3.5/5 stars
Pitchfork	7.0

Alienist is the final studio album by avant-garde music group Psychic TV. It was announced on 11 August 2016, and released on 16 September 2016, by Angry Love Productions.

"Jump into the Fire" is a cover of the 1971 Harry Nilsson song. "How Does It Feel" is a cover of the 1967 song "How Does It Feel to Feel" by UK mod/freakbeat group The Creation.

== Reception ==
According to Pitchfork.com "if Psychic TV sound like a bar band on these covers, it’s a bar band that puts a lot of thought into its choice of songs. Since 2009, Psychic TV have recorded covers of Funkadelic’s “Maggot Brain,” Hawkwind’s “Silver Machine,” Can’s "Mother Sky," and Captain Beefheart’s “Dropout Boogie,” releasing the covers as 12-inches once a year with new original tunes as B-sides. Alienist presents two covers and two originals that together clock-in at 34 minutes—long enough to qualify as a full-length but slanted closer to the mixed-bag personality an EP".

== Track listing ==
All tracks are written by Psychic TV, except noted

No.	Title	Writer(s)	Length
1.	"Jump into the Fire"	Harry Nilsson	9:48
2.	"Looking for You"		11:51
3.	"How Does It Feel?"	Bob Garner; Eddie Phillips	3:50
4.	"Alienist"		8:57

== Charts ==
Chart (2016)	Peak position
UK Physical Singles (OCC)	5
