= Trip Reset =

Studio album by Genesis P-Orridge and Psychic TV
- Released: 6 February 1996
- Genre: Psychedelia
- Length: 78:00
- Label: Cleopatra
- Producer: Genesis P-Orridge, Larry Thrasher

Genesis P-Orridge and Psychic TV chronology
Breathe (1995)	Trip Reset (1996)	Cold Blue Torch (1996)

Trip Reset is a 1996 album credited to Genesis P-Orridge and Psychic TV featuring The Angels of Light.

The title is a colloquialism of P-Orridge's. S/he used this term to describe the act of taking a psychedelic to "reset" patterns of personal thought and behavior.

It includes a cover of Pink Floyd's "Set the Controls for the Heart of the Sun", a tribute to Syd Barrett called "A Star Too Far", and a tribute to The West Coast Pop Art Experimental Band called "Suspicious".

== Track listing ==
1. "The La La Song"
2. "Set the Controls for the Heart of the Sun"
3. "I Believe What You Said"
4. "Mother Jack (A Children's Story)"
5. "Wrongs Of Spring"
6. "Lady Maybe"
7. "White Sky"
8. "Black Cat"
9. "A Star Too Far" (Lullaby For Syd Barrett)
10. "Suspicious (West Coast Experimental Pop Art Mix)"
11. "Firewoman (Exhuma Exhortation)"

== Personnel ==
- William Breeze - Electric Viola and Viola Synthesizer
- Michael Campagna - Lead Guitar and Guitar Synthesizer
- Billy "Pink" Goodrum - Keyboards
- Genesis P-Orridge - Lead Vocals, Harmonies, Analog Effects, Analog Samples
- Larry Thrasher - Lead Guitars, Bass Guitars, Analog Synthesizer, Tabla, Percussion, Backing Vocals
- Mother Jack - Children's Method Storytelling, Background Voices
- Caresse P-Orridge - Backing Vocals, Harmonies, Analog Keyboards
- Genesse P-Orridge - Backing Vocals, Harmonies, Analog Keyboards

== Cold Blue Torch ==
Cold Blue Torch

Remix album by Psychic TV
- Released: 1996
- Label: Cleopatra Records CLP 9711-2

Psychic TV chronology
Trip Reset (1996)	Cold Blue Torch (1996)	Hell is Invisible... Heaven is Her/e (2007)

Cold Blue Torch is a remix album of some songs from the album Trip/Reset.

=== Track listing ===
1. "Wrongs Of Spring (Paul Raven Mix)" - 6:00
  - Remix - Paul Raven
2. "Fire Woman (cEvin Key Mix)" - 4:51
  - Remix - cEvin Key
3. "Lady Maybe (Dub Me Maybe Mix)" - 6:06
  - Remix - DJ Cheb I Sabbah Wa Mektoub
4. "I Believe What You Said (Leæther Strip Version)" - 6:08
  - Remix - Leæther Strip, Claus Larsen
5. "Suspicious (Unfaithful Mix)" - 4:24
  - Remix - Tom Muschitz
6. "Fire Woman (Fabrique Club Mix)" - 5:10
  - Remix - Martin Atkins
7. "I Believe What You Said (Spahn Ranch Mix)" - 4:33
  - Remix - Spahn Ranch, Matt Green
8. "I Believe What You Said (Oneiroid Psychosis Mix)" - 4:29
  - Remix - Oneiroid Psychosis

=== Personnel ===
- Judson Leach, Lori Sprester, Larry Thrasher, Chris Peterson, Anthony Valcic, Martin Atkins - engineers
- Curse Mackey - sampler
- BobDog - guitar
- William Breeze - viola
- Roberto Castello - congas
- Genesis P-Orridge - artwork
