= Slow Death EP =

Slow Death

EP by The Leather Nun
- Released: November 1979
- Recorded: Dec 1978, May 1979
- Genre: Punk rock, post-punk, industrial
- Length: 12:14
- Label: Industrial Records

The Leather Nun chronology
Slow Death (1979)	Primemover (1981)

LP cover
- cover of re-release as LP

Slow Death, an EP, is the debut release by Swedish rockers The Leather Nun.

== History ==
Singer Jonas Almquist landed a recording contract for a single with Industrial Records. He recorded "Death Threats" at Bagger Studio engineered by Magnus Bagger on December 14, 1978. In order to record a b-side he formed The Leather Nun in Gothenburgh, Sweden, in February 1979.

The band was road-tested during a festival in March 1979 and then recorded "No Rule", "Ensam I Natt" and "Slow Death" at Chall Sound Studio on May 25, 1979, engineered by Challe Åström to choose from for the b-side.

Industrial Records could not decide and the single ended up a 7-inch EP and was released in November 1979. In the same year "Slow Death" hit No. 1 in Germany's Musik Express Alternative Charts.

The cover art by Peter Christopherson shows the corpse of Roberto Crescenzio, who was killed in a 1977 firebombing.

Compared to the group's later recordings the songs are heavily industrial and abrasive.

When re-released as LP in August 1986 a long live version of "Slow Death", recorded live at the Scala Cinema in London on February 29, 1980, was added as new b-side. The live version featured Genesis P-Orridge on violin and Monte Cazazza on synthesizer, and had been previously released on the Live at Scala cassette by Industrial Records. The songs from the original EP filled now the a-side, but "Ensam I Natt" was exchanged with a different version, previously released in July 1984 on Criminal Damage Records.

The cover art was changed to show a pattern of skulls resembling the shape of the African continent.

The record has not been re-released as CD.

== Track listing (original release) ==
All compositions and arrangements by The Leather Nun.

1. "No Rule" – 2:50
2. "Death Threats" – 3:38
3. "Slow Death" – 5:33
4. "Ensam I Natt" – 0:13

== Track listing (re-release) ==
All compositions and arrangements by The Leather Nun.

1. "No Rule"
2. "Slow Death"
3. "Ensam I Natt" full version
4. "Death Threats"
5. "Slow Death" (Live) with Monte Cazazza on synthesizer, Genesis P-Orridge on violin

== Personnel ==
- Jonas Almquist: vocals
- Bengt Aronsson: guitars
- Gert Claesson: drums
- Freddie Wadling: bass
