= Allegory and Self =

Studio album by Psychic TV
- Released: 1988
- Genres: Psychedelia; avant-garde; post-punk; new wave
- Labels: Temple Records; Dais Records
- Producer: Genesis P-Orridge

Psychic TV chronology
| Themes 2 (1985) | Allegory and Self (1988) | Jack the Tab/Tekno Acid Beat (1988) |

Professional ratings
Review scores
| Source | Rating |
|---|---|
| AllMusic | 4/5 stars |

Allegory and Self: Illustrations in Sound is a studio album released by Psychic TV in 1988. It was initially released on the band's label Temple Records, before being reissued as a remaster in 2017 by Dais Records.

== Background ==
Psychic TV's line-up for Allegory and Self included Rose McDowall as a vocalist and musician, with Monte Cazazza, Dave Ball and Hilmar Örn Hilmarsson also contributing instrumentation and production. "Caresse Song" is a recording by P-Orridge's daughter Caresse, singing as she toys around with a keyboard. "Starlit Mire" takes its title from the book of epigrams of the same title (written by two doctors, James Bertram and F. Russell), illustrated by Spare around 1910, in which his illustrations once more displayed his interest in the abnormal and the grotesque.

Several editions of Allegory and Self were produced, including the original picture disc (TOPY 035) and black vinyl (TOPY 038) versions in 1988 on Temple Records, Fundamental Records (SPIN 1006) and on pink marbled vinyl (666 copies). It has also appeared on CD in at least two versions, on Spin and Cleopatra (CLEO94912 - with 3 bonus remixed tracks). The cover graphics feature Austin Osman Spare's General Allegory and other illustrations from his Automatic Drawings and Book of Satyrs. In the original release a book of what seems to be P-Orridge's own Book of Satyrs was included, with pen-and-ink drawings and illuminations and key lyrics, handwritten in a manner influenced by Spare.

== Reception ==
Trouser Press described "Godstar" (which is about musician Brian Jones) as "a catchy pop single".

== Track listing ==
=== 12" vinyl ===
Side One:

1. "Godstar"
2. "Just Like Arcadia"
3. "Southern Comfort"
4. "We Kiss"
5. "She Was Surprised"
6. "Caresse Song"

Side Two:

1. "Starlit Mire"
2. "Thee Dweller"
3. "Being Lost"
4. "Baby's Gone Away"
5. "Ballet Disco"

== Personnel ==
- Genesis P-Orridge
- Caresse P-Orridge
- Alex Fergusson
- Dave Ball
- Hilmar Örn Hilmarsson
- Monte Cazazza
- Rose McDowall
