= Beyond Thee Infinite Beat =

Remix album by Psychic TV
- Released: 1990
- Label: Temple Records

Professional ratings
Review scores
Source	Rating
AllMusic	mixed

Beyond Thee Infinite Beat (subtitled Ravemaster Mixes) is a remix album by Psychic TV. The album is composed of remixed songs from Towards Thee Infinite Beat.

== Track listing ==
=== CD version ===
1. "Money For E. (Remix By David Ball)" - 5:24
  - Remix - David Ball
2. "S.M.I.L.E. (Remix By Greedy Beat Syndicate)" - 7:22
  - Remix - The Greedy Beat Syndicate
3. "Bliss (Remix By Andy Falconer)" - 4:46
  - Remix - Andy Falconer
4. "Horror House (Remix By DJ Sugar Jay)" - 6:46
  - Remix - DJ Sugar Jay
5. "I.C. Water (Remix By Evil Eddie)" - 7:01
  - Remix - Evil Eddie
6. "Stick Insect (Remix By Dj Global)" - 8:12
  - Remix - DJ Global
7. "Money For E. (Remix By Jack The Tab)" - 10:50
  - Remix - Jack The Tab
8. (untitled) - 3:16

=== 12" vinyl version ===
Side A

1. "Money For E (Remix)" - 5:22
  - Remix - David Ball

Side B

1. "Horror House (Remix) (6:49)
  - Remix - DJ Sugar Jay

Side C

1. "S.M.I.L.E. (Remix)" - 7:31
  - Remix - The Greedy Beat Syndicate
2. "Bliss (Remix)" - 4:44
  - Remix - Andy Falconer

Side D

1. "Stick Insect (Remix)" - 5:59
  - Remix - Evil Eddie
2. "I. C. Water (Remix)" - 8:11
  - Remix - DJ Global
- The A and B record runs at 45 rpm.
- The C and D record runs at 33 1/3 rpm.
