= Jack the Tab/Tekno Acid Beat =

Compilation album by Psychic TV

Compilation album by Psychic TV
- Released: 1990
- Label: Wax Trax! Records WAX 7127

Jack The Tab - Acid Tablets Volume One

Studio album by Psychic TV
- Released: 1988
- Genre: Acid house
- Label: Castalia Recordings ACID 001

Tekno Acid Beat

Studio album by Psychic TV
- Released: 1988
- Label: Temple Records; 12" vinyl: TOPY 039, CD: TOPY 041

Professional ratings
Review scores
Source	Rating
AllMusic	2.5/5 stars

Jack the Tab/Tekno Acid Beat is a compilation of material by Psychic TV released under the guise of two various artists compilation albums, Jack the Tab – Acid Tablets Volume One and Tekno Acid Beat.

== Legacy ==
Jack the Tab was described by The Guardian as "Britain's first acid house record".

== Track listing ==
This list gives alias, then track name
All tracks composed by Dave Ball, Genesis P-Orridge and Richard Norris; except where indicated

=== CD ===
CD 1:

1. King Tubby: "Psyche Out" - 3:53
2. Pearl Necklace: "Rapid Bliss" - 4:07
3. Thee Loaded Angels: "Aquarius Rising" - 1:36
4. Wolves Of The Sun: "Last Night" - 1:07
5. Mistress Mix: "Blue Heart" (Genesis P-Orridge) - 5:54
6. Griselda: "Oxygen" - 3:46
7. Psychic TV: "Jump Thee Gun" - 8:29
8. Over Thee Brink: "Terminate" - 5:52
9. Vernon Castle: "Youth" - 1:31
10. Nobody Uninc: "Only Human" (Nobody Uninc - Genesis P-Orridge, Richard Norris, Scott "Nobody" Hosterman) - 6:15
11. Alligator Shear: "Balkan Red Alert" - 4:59
12. M.E.S.H.: "Meet Every Situation Head On" - 5:25
13. Psychic TV: "Your Body" - 9:14
14. Godstar: "Abstract Reality" - 3:45

CD 2:

1. Virginia featuring Mista Luv: "Blue Pyramid" (Gini Ball) - 5:21
2. Sugardog: "Groove To Get Down" (Jim Whelan, John Gosling) - 4:52
3. Mistress Mix: "Wicked" (Genesis P-Orridge) - 6:32
4. Psychic TV: "Scared To Live" - 4:52
5. DJ Doktor Megatrip & Mista Luv: "Liquid Eyeliner" - 5:57
6. Sickmob: "Sandoz Tabman" (Fred Giannelli) - 5:25
7. Psychic TV: "Tune In (Turn On The Acid House)" - 5:33
8. DJ Doktor Megatrip with Luv Bass: "Joy" - 5:22
9. DJ Doktor Megatrip: "Discomen" - 9:30
10. Psychic TV: "Tune In" (Greedy Beat Syndicate remix) - 4:32
11. Psychic TV: "Love-War-Riot" (Vocoder mix) - 6:56
12. DJ Doktor Megatrip: "Neuropolitiks" - 2:31

=== 2X12" vinyl ===
Side A:

1. King Tubby: "Psyche Out"
2. Pearl Necklace: "Rapid Bliss"
3. Thee Loaded Angels: "Aquarius Rising"
4. Wolves Of The Sun: "Last Night"
5. Mistress Mix: "Blue Heart"
6. Griselda: "Oxygen"

Side B:

1. Psychic TV: "Jump Thee Gun"
2. Over Thee Brink: "Terminate"
3. Vernon Castle: "Youth"
4. Nobody Uninc: "Only Human"
5. Alligator Shear: "Balkan Red Alert"
6. M.E.S.H.: "Meet Every Situation Head On"

Side C:

1. Virginia: "Blue Pyramid"
2. Sugardog: "Groove To Get Down"
3. Mistress Mix: "Wicked"
4. Psychic TV: "Scared To Live"

Side D:

1. DJ Doktor Megatrip & Mista Luv: "Liquid Eyeliner"
2. Sickmob: "Sandoz Tabman"
3. Psychic TV: "Tune In (Turn On Thee Acid House)"
4. DJ Doktor Megatrip with Luv Bass: "Joy"
