= Psychic TV =

British-American multimedia collective

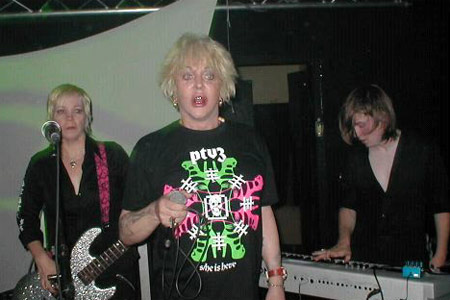
- Psychic TV performing in Cologne in 2004. Left to right: Alice Genese (bass), Genesis P-Orridge (vocals), Markus Persson (keyboards).

Background information
- Also known as: PTV; PTV3; Psychic TV & Genesis P-Orridge; Psychic Television; Psychic TV; Deep Fry; ESsence; Griselda; Homeboy Posse; Jack the Tab; King Cut Groovers; The; Love in Life; M.E.S.H.; Nobody Uninc; Over Thee Brink; Pearl Necklace; Safe; Too See Bee; White Dove; Wolves of the Sun; Ecstasy Boys
- Origin: London, England
- Genres: Experimental; acid house; industrial; psychedelic rock; post-punk
- Years active: 1981–1999; 2003–2020
- Labels: Some Bizzare; Temple Records; Wax Trax!; Sacred Bones; Dais; Mishka
- Spinoffs: Coil; Thee Majesty; Splinter Test
- Past members: Members and collaborators

Psychic TV (aka PTV or Psychick TV or several other aliases) were an English experimental video art and music collective, formed by performance artist Genesis P-Orridge and songwriter Alex Fergusson in 1981 after the break-up of Throbbing Gristle. They have released over one hundred full-length albums to date.

Contributors include artists such as Coil, Current 93, Monte Cazazza, Larry Thrasher, Hilmar Örn Hilmarsson, Soft Cell, Fred Giannelli, Hafler Trio, The Cult, Master Musicians of Jajouka, William Breeze, Derek Jarman, John Gosling, Timothy Leary, Rose McDowall, Andrew Weatherall, and Z'EV. Thee Temple ov Psychick Youth (a.k.a. T.O.P.Y.) formed as an organisation at the inception of the band, who conceived it as a magical order and the philosophical wing of Psychic TV. T.O.P.Y. functions as a cult-like fan-club for the group.

Psychic TV was influential in pioneering the acid house genre, releasing several fake compilations in an effort to popularize the sound, such as Jack the Tab and Tekno Acid Beat. According to some, acid house was given its name by Genesis Breyer P-Orridge. After breaking up in 1999, they reformed as PTV3 with a new line-up in 2003, but disbanded in 2020 when their core member Genesis Breyer P-Orridge died.

== History ==
Since Genesis P-Orridge primarily wrote the lyrics instead of the music for Psychic TV, the history of Psychic TV can be broken up into the periods of the main songwriter that was working with them at the time.

=== 1981–87: Alex Fergusson period ===
Psychic TV was formed with the core membership of Genesis P-Orridge (ex-Throbbing Gristle) and Alex Fergusson in 1981. Alex Fergusson was a member of the punk/experimental outfit Alternative TV, with whom P-Orridge performed at one point throughout Throbbing Gristle's run. The band name was derived from P-Orridge's use of the word 'Psychic', and 'TV' from Fergusson's old band. Later, in 1982, ex-Throbbing Gristle member Peter Christopherson got involved and claimed that the 'TV' component of the name was intended to focus on the visual elements of the outfit. P-Orridge once claimed that "Psychic TV is a video group who does music unlike a music group which makes music videos".

Psychic TV made their live debut in Autumn 1982 as a part of the "Final Academy", a multi-performance event dedicated to and featuring William S. Burroughs. In November 1982, Psychic TV's debut studio album, Force the Hand of Chance, was released by Some Bizzare Records and distributed by WEA International; its accompanying single, "Just Drifting", came out in the same year's December. Dreams Less Sweet, a follow-up to Force... was released in 1983. Lyrics were handled by P-Orridge while the music was written by Fergusson and sound experiments by Christopherson and John Balance – foreshadowing the pair's later work as Coil. Marc Almond of Soft Cell also contributed vocals.

The live shows, such as those at the Berlin Atonal festival, continued to include improvised noise elements until Christopherson left and Fergusson brought in new musicians. In 1986, Psychic TV began a series of 23 live show performances being recorded and released, each from a different nation, on the 23rd of each month for 23 months. Though the series was discontinued after 17 albums, it earned the band an entry in The Guinness Book of World Records for 'Most recordings'. Towards the end of this period Fergusson and P-Orridge completed their third proper studio album, Allegory and Self, recorded in 1986 and released in 1988. Fergusson left in early 1987 due to disagreements with band management.

=== 1988–92: Fred Giannelli period ===
During this period Fred Giannelli, Dave Ball from Soft Cell, Richard Norris (who later formed the Grid with Dave Ball), John Gosling, engineer Richard Evans and other techno artists released music not only as Psychic TV but also under a variety of fake names. The idea behind this was to release fake "compilations" by imaginary artists, creating a sense that a healthy acid house scene existed in the UK. The key studio albums of this period were Jack the Tab – Acid Tablets Volume One (1988), Tekno Acid Beat (1988), Towards Thee Infinite Beat (1990; credited to Psychic TV) and Beyond Thee Infinite Beat (1992; credited to Psychic TV; 12" remixes of Towards tracks which could be played at 33 or 45 rpm). Almost all of the live shows in this period were based around the songs on these albums. From '88–'90 PTV was very stable as a live unit and did more gigs and touring than any other version of PTV before or after. They embarked on a long tour of the US and UK in 1988, Europe in 1989 and another long tour of the United States in 1990.

In 1990, Psychic TV released the song "I.C. Water" from the album Towards Thee Infinite Beat as a 7" and 12" single on the 10-year anniversary of the death of Joy Division vocalist Ian Curtis. The sleeve was a hand drawn image of Ian Curtis derived from a famous photograph.

In the early 1990s, vice-president of Elektra Records, Howard Thompson took an interest in signing Psychic TV. He explained that he was going to take a one-year sabbatical from the music industry and he had been asked to run a major independent record label and he wanted to sign Psychic TV to that label. The label was in fact, Herb Alpert's and Jerry Moss's new imprint Almo Sounds, after the sale of A & M Records. Studio time was booked and Genesis P-Orridge, Fred Giannelli and Matthew Best went into Brilliant Studios in San Francisco to record demos. Four tracks were recorded and rough mixes delivered and were rejected by Almo Sounds. The songs were entitled: "Snowflake", "Intoxication", "E-Lusive" and "Avatar". During this period, the band famously performed at Mr Floppy's Flophouse events in Oakland.

=== 1992–93: exile ===
In 1992, a video apparently created by Psychic TV was falsely presented as evidence of Satanic ritual abuse in an edition of Channel 4 TV's Dispatches. As a result, P-Orridge claimed initially that they were deported, although later admitted that they decided not to return to England from Kathmandu, where they and their family had been on holiday after selling an Austin Osman Spare painting to Chris Stein from Blondie for US$10,000 which financed the trip. They also spent some time with Tibetan refugees, and instead of returning to the UK chose to go into "self-imposed exile". The programme was later discredited, though not before their house was raided by the police and the allegations had been repeated in the tabloid press. They said that they felt they would not get a fair hearing if they returned to England, so the family moved to California.

Shortly after moving to the US, P-Orridge underwent a divorce which traumatised them immensely. Most of the output during this period was made up of re-releases of earlier albums, especially by industrial music record labels who released the albums as a "paying of respects" to the founder of industrial music.

=== 1993–1999: Larry Thrasher period ===
In 1992 Kim Cascone, founder of Silent Records, introduced P-Orridge to Larry Thrasher, co-founder of the mid 80's American experimental noise band Thessalonians. This began a new period with Psychic TV returning to its psychedelic pop roots with Thrasher co-producing and co-writing the critically acclaimed Trip/Reset as well as the album "Cold Blue Torch" and new experimental explorations which centred around the spoken word poetry of P-orridge in releases like "Thee Fractured Garden" and "Breathe". "Thee Fractured Garden" was a seminal example of this period where Psychic TV blended ambient music, samples and sound collages with spoken word. This eventually led P-Orridge and Thrasher to the create several offshoot groups Splinter Test and later Thee Majesty, which focused on the spoken word and sonic experiments.

Other notable releases upon which P-Orridge collaborated with Thrasher were the Electric Newspapers, a series of open source sample releases that blurred the sampling CD concept with a stream of consciousness listening experience. Material from the Electric Newspaper series of releases (there are six in total, but only four have been released) is mostly taken from the CDs PTV released with Thrasher along with contributors such as Skinny Puppy and other notable musical allies of this time. The original motivation for the Electric Newspaper series was to ensure that the PTV sample files were archived after the loss of the entire PTV sampling library in the dramatic five alarm fire at the Houdini Mansion on Laurel Canyon in Hollywood. This fire, which burned down the 18,000 sq ft (1,700 m^{2}) mansion, left P-Orridge in the intensive care unit at Cedar Sinai hospital with life-threatening injuries after they (along with members of the band Love and Rockets) jumped from their bedroom windows to escape the flames. Results of this event sent P-Orridge on a two-year health sabbatical to recover, during which they were involved in a million dollar lawsuit against Rick Rubin, who owned the Houdini Mansion. P-Orridge won the case, but was left with a metal plate and eight screws in their permanently disabled and reconstructed arm.

In 1998 P-Orridge announced that they primarily wanted to move into spoken word, which is when Campagna left the band to pursue his own projects, and turned to focus on Thee Majesty with musical line-up of Larry Thrasher and Bryin Dall.

In 2005, the Voiceprint record label in England re-released several older Psychic TV and Genesis P-Orridge albums under the name Thee Majesty, and also a new album recorded with the band Cotton Ferox. Also, a 2005 release, Mary Never Wanted Jesus, credited to Genesis P-Orridge & Thee Majesty featured archive PTV material alongside new Thee Majesty recordings. PTV, as a rock entity, had a "final show" in 1999 at The Royal Festival Hall in London. This show also marked the end of P-Orridge's exile from the UK.

=== 2003–2020: reformation, PTV3/Edley ODowd period ===
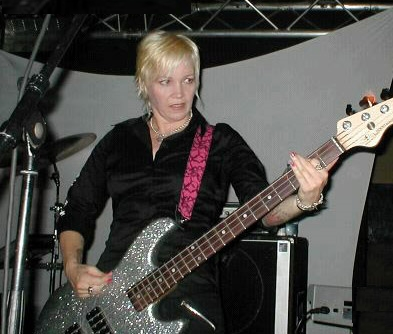
Genese with Psychic TV in Germany 2004

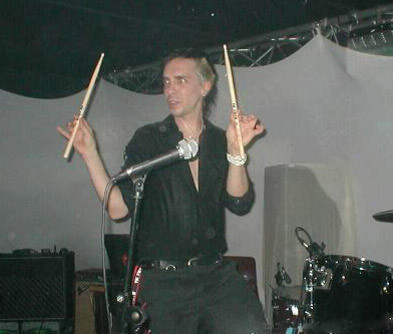
ODowd with Psychic TV in Germany 2004

With encouragement from drummer Edley ODowd of Toilet Böys, Genesis reformed Psychic TV with an all new line-up, returning to the stage in 2003 with a concert in New York under the guise of PTV3, with a lineup including Edley ODowd, Alice Genese (bass), Douglas Rushkoff (keyboards) and Lady Jaye Breyer P-Orridge (sampler). The concert featured video projections by Sam Zimmerman (Crash Worship). In September 2004, an extensive tour of Europe (covering sixteen countries) and North America was launched. 2005 saw the band return to the studio, recording their first album in over ten years (P-Orridge also spent 2005 working with Throbbing Gristle on their first album in over twenty-five years). Additionally, a few more dates were performed in Europe throughout the year.

In January 2006, a new PTV album was announced by P-Orridge on their website entitled Hell Is Invisible... Heaven Is Her/e. The album was recorded in New York and features Nick Zinner (Yeah Yeah Yeahs) and Gibby Haynes (Butthole Surfers) guesting on some tracks. P-Orridge described it as "The Dark Side of the Moon for the 21st century".

Concerts in 2006 included Sheffield, Birmingham and London as well as Brussels, Amsterdam and Moscow. The 2006 line up consisted of Genesis Breyer P-Orridge (vocals, "noise bass"), Lady Jaye Breyer P-Orridge (samples), Edley ODowd (drums), Alice Genese (bass), David Max (guitar), Markus Aurelius Cirkus Maximus Dangerous Fabulous Persson (keyboards) and Zef Noi$e (electric violin). The 2006 shows included an 'all new video light show' by Sterile Cowboys & Co. (a.k.a. Nicolas Jenkins) – three screens of heavily overlaid video with the middle screen overlaid by yet another layer of "analog" projections, including moiréd overlays and liquid/oil effects performed by "something human" a.k.a. Caleigh Fisher, a friend from the TOPY years. Videos from the upcoming album and DVDs were previewed as works in process. Much of the video work revolves around Breyer P-Orridges exploration of the 'pandrogyne'.

P-Orridge and Mo Edley performed a DJ set and were interviewed on New York's station WNYU on 5 September 2006. PTV3 performed several songs on WFMU in Jersey City on 7 September. The band were interviewed as well. This was the first time ever Psychic TV had played live on air. To inaugurate the release of Hell Is Invisible... Heaven Is Her/e, PTV3 hosted a five night residency in September 2006 at Galapagos Art Space in Williamsburg, Brooklyn, USA, followed by the above-mentioned tour. Hell Is Invisible... Heaven Is Her/e was released in 2007.

In February 2007 the website Side-Line announced the news that the Fee Lee record label released a Psychic TV live album, Live in Russia. In the same year Psychic TV played at the ZXZW festival.

Lady Jaye died suddenly on 9 October 2007 at home in Brooklyn, New York, from a previously undiagnosed heart condition which is thought to have been connected with her long-term battle with stomach cancer. Lady Jaye collapsed and died in Genesis' arms, as described in the 2011 movie "The Ballad Of Genesis And Lady Jaye" by Marie Losier.

PTV3 released the CD-DVD set Mr. Alien Brain vs. The Skinwalkers in December 2008, the first full-length release since the death of Genesis' "other half" Jaye Breyer (best known as Lady Jaye). The two had previously embarked on a years-long pursuit of "pandrogyny", undergoing painful plastic surgery procedures to become gender-neutral human beings that looked like each other.

We started out, because we were so crazy in love, just wanting to eat each other up, to become each other and become one. And as we did that, we started to see that it was affecting us in ways that we didn't expect. Really, we were just two parts of one whole; the pandrogyne was the whole and we were each other's other half.

Band leader Genesis P-Orridge was diagnosed with chronic myelomonocytic leukaemia in October 2017, and died in New York City on 14 March 2020, aged 70.

== Live performances ==
Psychic TV have performed live many times in their career with an ever-changing and eclectic selection of musicians. Live releases account for about half of Psychic TV's discography and with one series of live releases they released seventeen live albums in eighteen months, enough to earn them a place in the Guinness Book of World Records.

On 4 November 2009, Genesis P-Orridge announced via their website, "Genesis Breyer P-Orridge is retiring from touring in any and all bands including TG to concentrate on art, writing and music." However, with PTV3 they eventually went on a short European tour in 2013 and were performing occasionally in the US and elsewhere.

In 2016 Psychic TV toured internationally to support their Alienist release.

== Members and collaborators ==
=== Timeline ===
Final line-up

- Genesis P-Orridge – lead vocals and lyrics, production (1981–2020; died 2020)
- Edward "Edley" ODowd – drums, production (2003–2020)
- Jeff Berner – guitar (2010–2020)
- Alice Genese – bass guitar (2003–2020)
- John Weingarten – keyboards (2014–2020)

Principal former members

- Alex Fergusson – guitar, bass, vocals, tunes, production (1981–1987)
- Peter Christopherson – keyboards, production (1982–1983; died 2010)
- Paula P-Orridge – vocals, percussion, tapes (1982–1994)
- Matthew Best – drums (1985–1999)
- Fred Giannelli – guitar, keyboards, production (1988–1993)
- Craig Ellenwood – live video projections, keyboards, production (1990–1993)
- Larry Thrasher – instruments, production (1993–1999)
- Jessica Stewart – keyboards, flute (2010–2014; died 2021)
