= Zurich (disambiguation) =

Zurich or Zürich is the largest city in Switzerland.

Zurich or Zürich may also refer to:

== Places ==
=== Switzerland ===
- Canton of Zurich, Swiss canton of which the city is the capital
- Zurich District
- Zurich Airport
- Lake Zurich, lake in Switzerland

=== United States ===
- Zurich, California
- Zurich, Kansas
- Zurich, Montana
- Zurich, New York, in Wayne County
- Lake Zurich, Illinois, town in Illinois

=== Other ===
- Zurich, Ontario, Canada
- Zurich, Friesland, Netherlands

== Organisations ==
- University of Zurich
- ETH Zurich, Swiss Federal Institute of Technology in Zurich
- Zurich Insurance Group, an insurance and risk management company
- FC Zürich, football (soccer) club
- Grasshopper Club Zurich, football (soccer) club

== Other uses ==
- Battle of Zürich (disambiguation), several battles
- 13025 Zürich, an asteroid
- Zürich ware, porcelain
- Zurich (film), a 2013 German film
- Zurich (Borbetomagus album), a 1984 live album by Borbetomagus
- Zurich (The White Foliage album)
- Zurich, a 2005 live album by Praxis
- Lake Zurich, a song by Gorillaz from the 2018 album The Now Now

== See also ==
- Stadion Zürich, multi-sport stadium
- Weltklasse Zürich, Golden League athletics meeting
- Zurich Bible, a bible translation historically based on the translation by Ulrich Zwingli
- Zurich 4 and 6, first postage stamp issued in mainland Europe
- Zurich German, dialect of German spoken in the Swiss canton
- Zurich model, of public transport, based on that of the city
- Zurich number, or Wolf number, a measure of sunspot activity
- Zurich Open, WTA Tour tennis tournament
- Zurich Classic of New Orleans, a professional golf tournament on the PGA Tour
