= Industrial Strength =

Industrial Strength may refer to:

- Industrial strength
- Industrial Strength, potato chips produced by Dakota Style
- Industrial Strength (album), a 1983 album by Borbetomagus
