= John McBride (photographer) =

American photographer

John McBride (born 1967) is an American photographer probably best known for his photographs taken in New York City of the riots surrounding Tompkins Square Park in 1988 and the eviction of Lower East Side squatters in 1989, although much of his work is not in the style of photojournalism.

John McBride attended Houston's High School for the Performing and Visual Arts (HSPVA), after which he studied under the direction of photographer George Krause at the University of Houston. McBride moved to the East Village neighborhood of New York City in 1986 at the age of nineteen and began his photographic career by assisting numerous commercial photographers on shoots in the United States and Europe. He also took courses at the School of Visual Arts and, later, attended Hunter College where he majored in Geography and Energy and Environmental Policy Studies.

John McBride's work includes fine art photography, fashion, portraits and photojournalism. The subjects of McBride's photographs include friends and lovers, the famous and the unknown, protesters, passersby as well as landscapes, cemeteries and religious and secular iconography. In 1985 McBride took many photographs of the people who frequented the clubs and street scene along Westheimer Road in Houston's Neartown area. Some of McBride's better-known work includes photographs of the 1988 riots surrounding New York City's Tompkins Square Park that were published in The Village Voice and the 1989 arrests of Lower East Side squatters and the demolition of their homes, many of which were published in the East Villager, as were photos of civil rights attorney William Kunstler and artist Keith Haring. Other work includes photographs taken in 1989 in Tututepec and Puerto Escondido, Mexico. More recent work includes pictures taken in Texas, Europe and in Tokyo, Japan (2008).

In 2007 a selection of McBride's photographs were chosen for inclusion in the permanent collection of the Museum of Fine Arts, Houston.

John McBride currently lives and works in New York City.

== Publication Credits ==
Publication credits include The New York Times, The Village Voice, The New York Daily News, The East Villager, The Houston Chronicle, The Houston Post, Public News and Entrepreneur Japan. His portrait of the band Masters of Reality, signed by producer Rick Rubin, was used inside their self-titled album released by Def American Recordings in 1988. In 1989 McBride's photograph of an angel statue in a Mexican graveyard was chosen by Profile Records for the cover of the 12-inch single "Hee-Haw" by the Sicilian Vespers.

== Popular culture ==
McBride was injured in the 1988 Tompkins Square Park riots when he was struck by a nightstick swung by a New York City police officer as he was taking still photographs atop a parked van on Avenue A alongside video artist Paul Garrin, who was also assaulted by the police. Garrin's videotaping of the police assault on them both and the subsequent worldwide broadcast of the footage is said to have been the possible inspiration behind the decision to make the character of Mark a documentary filmmaker in the Broadway musical Rent by the late Jonathon Larson, and the riots as a whole inspired the scenes of protest and violent conflict in the first act of the musical.
