= Snuff Jazz =

Live album by Borbetomagus
- Released: 1989
- Recorded: November 24, 1988–August 25, 1989
- Studio: Various: ABC No Rio; (New York City, NY); DC Space; (Washington, D.C.)
- Genre: Free improvisation
- Length: 33:10
- Label: Agaric

Borbetomagus chronology
Seven Reasons for Tears (1989)	Snuff Jazz (1989)	Asbestos Shake (1991)

Snuff Jazz is a live album by free jazz band Borbetomagus. It was released in 1989 on Agaric Records.

== Track listing ==
Side one
No.	Title	Length
1.	"11/24/88 at ABC No Rio, New York"	16:44

Side two
No.	Title	Length
1.	"8/25/89 at DC Space, Washington"	16:28

CD track listing
No.	Title	Length
1.	"ABC"	16:42
2.	"BBC"	7:40
3.	"CBC"	9:42
4.	"DC"	16:27

== Personnel ==
Adapted from Snuff Jazz liner notes.

Borbetomagus

- Don Dietrich – saxophone
- Donald Miller – electric guitar
- Jim Sauter – saxophone

Production and additional personnel

- Bruce Hanke – cover art
- Wharton Tiers – engineering

== Release history ==
Region	Date	Label	Format	Catalog
United States	1989	Agaric	LP	Ag 1988
United States	1990	Agaric	CD	Ag 1988
