= Borbetomagus (1980 album) =

Studio album by Borbetomagus
- Released: 1980
- Recorded: April 12, 1980
- Studio: Skunk Hollow (Pomona, NY)
- Genre: Free improvisation
- Length: 40:38
- Label: Agaric

Borbetomagus chronology
Borbetomagus (1980)	Work on What Has Been Spoiled (1981)

Professional ratings
Review scores
Source	Rating
Allmusic	4/5 stars

Borbetomagus is the debut studio album of Borbetomagus, released in 1980 by Agaric Records.

== Track listing ==
Side one
No.	Title	Length
1.	"Concordat 1"	12:13
2.	"Concordat 2"	5:48

Side two
No.	Title	Length
1.	"Concordat 3"	5:19
2.	"Concordat 4"	9:28
3.	"Concordat 5"	7:34

CD bonus tracks
No.	Title	Length
6.	"The Lost Concordat"	7:55

== Personnel ==
Adapted from Borbetomagus liner notes.

Borbetomagus

- Don Dietrich – saxophone, design
- Brian Doherty – electronics
- Donald Miller – electric guitar
- Jim Sauter – saxophone

Production and additional personnel

- Joseph Quesada – engineer
- Michael "Maiden" Smirnoff – cover art

== Release history ==
Region	Date	Label	Format	Catalog
United States	1980	Agaric	LP	Ag 1980
United States	1995	Agaric	CD	Ag 1980
