= 1933 Your House Is Mine =

Studio album by Missing Foundation
- Released: 1988
- Recorded: Music Box (New York City, NY)
- Genres: Industrial, post-punk
- Length: 36:55
- Label: Purge/Sound League
- Producers: Missing Foundation, Jim Waters

Missing Foundation chronology
Missing Foundation (1987)	1933 Your House Is Mine (1988)	Demise (1989)

1933 Your House Is Mine is the second studio album by Missing Foundation, released in 1988 by Purge/Sound League.

== Track listing ==
Side one
No.	Title	Length
1.	"Kingsland 61"	2:18
2.	"Burn Trees"	6:28
3.	"Invasion of Your Privacy"	1:40
4.	"Go Sit on the Beach"	2:34
5.	"Death of a Wolf"	1:05
6.	"At the Gates"	1:36
7.	"Journey from the Ashes"	1:47

Side two
No.	Title	Length
1.	"Jameels/Turmoil"	5:42
2.	"Your House Is Mine"	4:04
3.	"Martyr of the City"	3:23
4.	"Message from Hell"	0:20
5.	"CIA World's Fair"	3:25
6.	"1933"	2:33

== Personnel ==
Adapted from 1933 Your House Is Mine liner notes.

Missing Foundation

- Mark Ashwill: drums, metal
- Chris Egan: drums
- Adam Nodelman: bass
- Florian Langmaack: drums
- Peter Missing: vocals, guitars, drums, percussion

Production and additional personnel

- Missing Foundation – production
- Jim Waters – production

== Release history ==
Region	Date	Label	Format	Catalog
United States	1988	Purge/Sound League	LP	PURGE 023
United States	1990	Restless	CD, CS	7 72389
United States	2013	Dais	LP	DAIS 049
