= Live in Allentown =

Live album by Borbetomagus
- Released: 1985
- Recorded: October 29, 1985
- Studio: Allentown, PA
- Genre: Free improvisation
- Length: 30:50
- Label: Agaric

Borbetomagus chronology
Borbeto Jam (1985)	Live in Allentown (1985)	New York Performances (1986)

Live in Allentown is a live performance album by Borbetomagus, released in 1985 by Agaric Records.

== Track listing ==
Side one
No.	Title	Length
1.	"[untitled]"	30:50

CD track listing
No.	Title	Length
1.	"[untitled]"	32:30
2.	"[untitled]"	21:27

== Personnel ==
Adapted from Live in Allentown liner notes.

Borbetomagus

- Don Dietrich – saxophone
- Donald Miller – electric guitar
- Adam Nodelman – bass guitar
- Jim Sauter – saxophone

Production and additional personnel

- Scott Legath – engineering
- Kenn Michael – photography
- Masahiko Ohno – cover art

== Release history ==
Region	Date	Label	Format	Catalog
United States	1985	Agaric	CS	
United States	1986	LowLife	CS	LL02
United States	2013	Agaric	CD	Ag 1996
