= Work on What Has Been Spoiled =

Studio album by Borbetomagus
- Released: 1981
- Genre: Free improvisation
- Length: 34:16
- Label: Agaric

Borbetomagus chronology
Borbetomagus (1980)	Work on What Has Been Spoiled (1981)	Borbetomagus (1982)

Work on What Has Been Spoiled is the second studio album by Borbetomagus, released in 1981 by Agaric Records. It features musical input from power electronics composer and pioneer Hugh Davies.

== Track listing ==
Side one
No.	Title	Length
1.	"Concordat 6"	7:13
2.	"Concordat 7"	4:57
3.	"Concordat 8"	6:38

Side two
No.	Title	Length
1.	"Concordat 9"	1:31
2.	"Concordat 10"	6:02
3.	"Concordat 11"	7:55

== Personnel ==
Adapted from Work on What Has Been Spoiled liner notes.

Borbetomagus

- Hugh Davies – electronics
- Don Dietrich – saxophone
- Donald Miller – electric guitar
- Jim Sauter – saxophone, cover art

Production and additional personnel

- Paul Laliberté – cover art
- Mike Smirnoff – photography

== Release history ==
Region	Date	Label	Format	Catalog
United States	1981	Agaric	LP	Ag 1981
