= Buncha Hair That Long =

Live album by Borbetomagus
- Released: 1992
- Recorded: March 1 – September 21, 1991
- Studio: Various: Babylon a Go Go; (Cleveland, OH); CBGB's; (New York City, NY); The Hunter Museum of Art; (Chattanooga, TN)
- Genre: Free improvisation
- Length: 58:00
- Label: Agaric

Borbetomagus chronology
Asbestos Shake (1991)	Buncha Hair That Long (1992)	Experience the Magic (1993)

Professional ratings
Review scores
Source	Rating
Allmusic	4/5 stars

Buncha Hair That Long is a live performance album by Borbetomagus, released in 1992 by Agaric Records.

== Track listing ==
No.	Title	Length
1.	"Friendly Fire"	11:30
2.	"Buncha Hair"	16:00
3.	"One for Tram"	6:47
4.	"In the Nursery"	7:15
5.	"Blue Jay Way" (Beatles cover)	16:28

== Personnel ==
Adapted from Buncha Hair That Long liner notes.

Borbetomagus

- Don Dietrich – saxophone
- Donald Miller – electric guitar
- Jim Sauter – saxophone

Production and additional personnel

- Bruce Hanke – cover art

== Release history ==
Region	Date	Label	Format	Catalog
United States	1991	Agaric	CD	Ag 1990
