= Borbetomagus (1982 album) =

Studio album by Borbetomagus
- Released: 1982
- Recorded: June 24, 1979–December 1, 1981
- Studio: Various: Aimi Studio; (New York City, NY); Bergen Community College; (Paramus, NJ); In Roads; (New York City, NY); The Wreck Room; (Nyack, NY)
- Genre: Free improvisation
- Length: 41:38
- Label: Agaric

Borbetomagus chronology
Work on What Has Been Spoiled (1981)	Borbetomagus (1982)	Barbed Wire Maggots (1983)

Professional ratings
Review scores
Source	Rating
Allmusic	3/5 stars

Borbetomagus is the third studio album by Borbetomagus, released in 1982 by Agaric Records.

== Track listing ==
Side one
No.	Title	Length
1.	"Aimi Studio"	18:16
2.	"In Roads"	6:34

Side two
No.	Title	Length
1.	"Bergen Community College"	9:24
2.	"The Wreck Room"	7:24

== Personnel ==
Adapted from Borbetomagus liner notes.

Borbetomagus

- Don Dietrich – saxophone
- Donald Miller – electric guitar
- Jim Sauter – saxophone

Additional musicians

- Brian Doherty – electronics (2)

Production and additional personnel

- Larry Alexander – assistant engineer
- Serban Stanciulescu – recording (1)
- Ted Goldberg – recording (2)
- Elizabeth McGuy – photography

== Release history ==
Region	Date	Label	Format	Catalog
United States	1982	Agaric	LP	Ag 1982
United States	1990	Agaric	CD	Ag 1982
