= Experience the Magic =

Live album by Borbetomagus
- Released: 1993
- Recorded: April 12 – December 23, 1993
- Studios: CBGB's (New York City, NY)
- Genre: Free improvisation
- Length: 58:50
- Label: Agaric

Borbetomagus chronology
Buncha Hair That Long (1992)	Experience the Magic (1993)	L'atlas des galaxies étranges (1995)

Professional ratings
Review scores
Source	Rating
Allmusic	4/5 stars

Experience the Magic is a live performance album by Borbetomagus, released in 1993 by Agaric Records.

== Track listing ==
No.	Title	Length
1.	"Bathed in the Blood of the Lamb"	33:35
2.	"Grunion Run"	25:15

== Personnel ==
Adapted from Experience the Magic liner notes.

Borbetomagus

- Don Dietrich – accordion
- Donald Miller – harp
- Jim Sauter – glass harmonica, design

Production and additional personnel

- Paul Laliberté – cover art
- Gary Solomon – additional engineering

== Release history ==
Region	Date	Label	Format	Catalog
United States	1993	Agaric	CD	Ag 1992
