= Ignore the White Culture =

Studio album by Missing Foundation
- Released: 1990
- Recorded: Music Box (New York City, NY)
- Genre: Industrial, post-punk
- Length: 70:16
- Label: Restless
- Producer: Missing Foundation, Jim Waters

Missing Foundation chronology
Demise (1989)	Ignore the White Culture (1990)	Go into Exile (1992)

Professional ratings
Review scores
Source	Rating
Robert Christgau	(D)

Ignore the White Culture is the fourth studio album by Missing Foundation, released in 1990 by Restless Records.

== Track listing ==
No.	Title	Length
1.	"Ignore the White Culture"	5:15
2.	"Rise Up"	5:10
3.	"Shining Path"	4:15
4.	"Back to the Square"	4:30
5.	"Who Are We"	6:16
6.	"Posada"	6:41
7.	"Turning the Tongue"	4:36
8.	"Tooth and Bolt"	4:37
9.	"Spiritual Hatred R.T.F.W."	6:09
10.	"Terrorism"	7:06
11.	"Fierce People Yanomamo"	3:38
12.	"Nations Fall"	5:01
13.	"Suckerbastards"	7:02

== Personnel ==
Adapted from Ignore the White Culture liner notes.

Missing Foundation

- Mark Ashwill – drums-metal
- Chris Egan – drums
- adam nodelman;- bass
- Florian Langmaack – drums-sax
- Peter Missing – metal-vocals

Production and additional personnel

- Missing Foundation – production
- Jim Waters – production

== Release history ==
Region	Date	Label	Format	Catalog
United States	1990	Restless	CD	7 72387
