= Seven Reasons for Tears =

Live album by Borbetomagus
- Released: 1989
- Recorded: December 6, 1987
- Studio: Music Box (New York City, NY)
- Genre: Free improvisation
- Length: 43:03
- Label: Purge/Sound League

Borbetomagus chronology
Fish That Sparkling Bubble (1988)	Seven Reasons for Tears (1989)	Snuff Jazz (1990)

Professional ratings
Review scores
Source	Rating
Allmusic	4/5 stars

Seven Reasons for Tears is a live performance album by Borbetomagus, released in 1989 by Purge/Sound League.

== Track listing ==
Side one
No.	Title	Length
1.	"1"	8:38
2.	"2"	3:58
3.	"3"	5:00
4.	"4"	5:18

Side two
No.	Title	Length
1.	"5"	4:40
2.	"6"	5:33
3.	"7a"	9:56
4.	"7b"	1:00

== Personnel ==
Adapted from Seven Reasons for Tears liner notes.

Borbetomagus

- Don Dietrich – saxophone
- Donald Miller – electric guitar
- Adam Nodelman – bass guitar
- Jim Sauter – saxophone

Production and additional personnel

- Jacques Kralian – recording
- Kenn Michael – cover art
- Dana Vlcek – additional engineering

== Release history ==
Region	Date	Label	Format	Catalog
United States	1989	Purge/Sound League	LP	Purge 027
United States	1993	Agaric	CD	Ag 1993
