= At In Roads =

Live album by Borbetomagus
- Released: 1983
- Recorded: November 27, 1982
- Studio: In Roads (New York City, NY)
- Genre: Free improvisation
- Length: 60:40
- Label: Cluster Project

Borbetomagus chronology
Barbed Wire Maggots (1983)	At In Roads (1983)	Industrial Strength (1983)

Professional ratings
Review scores
Source	Rating
Allmusic	4/5 stars

At In Roads is a live performance album by Borbetomagus, released in 1983 by Cluster Project.

== Track listing ==
Side one
No.	Title	Length
1.	"[untitled]"	28:50

Side two
No.	Title	Length
1.	"[untitled]"	16:28
2.	"[untitled]"	15:22

== Personnel ==
Adapted from At In Roads liner notes.

Borbetomagus

- Don Dietrich – saxophone
- Brian Doherty – electronics
- Donald Miller – electric guitar, cover art
- Jim Sauter – saxophone

Production and additional personnel

- Ted Goldberg – co-producer

== Release history ==
Region	Date	Label	Format	Catalog
United States	1983	Cluster Project	CS	SAX 001
Japan	2005	P.S.F.	CD	PSFD-19
