= Take, Take, Take =

Take, Take, Take may refer to:

== Music ==
- "Take, Take, Take", song by Missing Foundation from the album Go into Exile (1992)
- "Take, Take, Take", song by Killing Joke from Ha
- "Take, Take, Take", song by The White Stripes from Get Behind Me Satan (2005)
- "Take, Take, Take", song by This Condition from Sessions
- "Take, Take, Take", song by The Helio Sequence from Young Effectuals (2001)
- "Take, Take, Take", song by Hot Leg from Red Light Fever (2009)

== Other ==
- Take Take Take, a chess media and technology company co-founded by Magnus Carlsen
