= John McBride =

John McBride or John MacBride may refer to:

- John R. McBride (1832–1904), U.S. Representative from Oregon
- John McBride (labor leader) (1854–1917), American labor union leader
- John MacBride (1868–1916), Irish republican
- John C. McBride (1908–1979), American politician in Wisconsin
- John McBride (footballer) (born 1923), Scottish footballer and coach
- John McBride (photographer) (born 1967), American photographer based in New York City
- John Paul McBride (born 1978), Scottish footballer
- John Evangelist McBride, Irish prelate of the Catholic Church
- John McBride (minister) (1651?–1718), Irish minister

== See also ==
- John McBryde (disambiguation)
- McBride (surname)
