= Missing Foundation (album) =

Studio album by Missing Foundation
- Released: 1987
- Recorded: Music Box (New York City, NY)
- Genre: Industrial, post-punk
- Length: 39:09
- Label: Purge/Sound League
- Producer: Missing Foundation, Jim Waters

Missing Foundation chronology
Missing Foundation (1987)	1933 Your House Is Mine (1988)

Missing Foundation is the debut studio album of Missing Foundation, released in 1987 by Purge/Sound League.

== Track listing ==
Side one
No.	Title	Length
1.	"Kill the Hypnotic Bastards"	4:04
2.	"Posada"	4:18
3.	"Awesome Blacks"	5:17
4.	"Eat by the Pool"	5:47
5.	"Star of David"	0:09

Side two
No.	Title	Length
1.	"All Washed Up"	4:52
2.	"Little Jean of France"	5:33
3.	"Sucked Into Eternity"	1:14
4.	"Waco Waco"	4:24
5.	"Perversion"	3:39

== Personnel ==
Adapted from Missing Foundation liner notes.

Missing Foundation

- Mark Ashwill – drums-metal
- Chris Egan – drums
- VKP-bass
- Chris Tsakis- guitar sample
- Peter Missing – vocals / percussion
- Adam Nodelman – bass
- Mudhut-violin

Production and additional personnel

- Missing Foundation – production, Audio engineering
- Jim Waters – production, engineering

== Release history ==
Region	Date	Label	Format	Catalog
United States	1987	Purge/Sound League	LP	PURGE 002
United States	1990	Restless	CD	7 72388
United States	2013	Dais	LP	DAIS 048
