= Fish That Sparkling Bubble =

Studio album by Borbetomagus & Voice Crack
- Released: 1988
- Recorded: March 12, 1988
- Studio: Music Box (New York City, NY)
- Genre: Free improvisation
- Length: 39:28
- Label: Agaric
- Producer: Don Dietrich, Andy Guhl, Donald Miller, Norbert Möslang, Adam Nodelman, Jim Sauter

Borbetomagus chronology
New York Performances (1986)	Fish That Sparkling Bubble (1988)	Seven Reasons for Tears (1989)

Professional ratings
Review scores
Source	Rating
Allmusic	4/5 stars

Fish That Sparkling Bubble is a collaborative studio album by Borbetomagus and Voice Crack, released in 1988 by Agaric Records.

== Track listing ==
Side one
No.	Title	Length
1.	"We Don't Need No Warrior Goddess"	8:38
2.	"Vungavunga"	10:56

Side two
No.	Title	Length
1.	"Cracked Magus"	7:15
2.	"Floonder King"	3:12
3.	"My Tongue in Your Cheek"	9:27

== Personnel ==
Adapted from Fish That Sparkling Bubble liner notes.

Musicians

- Don Dietrich – saxophone, producer
- Andy Guhl – electronics, producer
- Donald Miller – electric guitar, producer
- Norbert Möslang – electronics, producer
- Adam Nodelman – bass guitar, producer
- Jim Sauter – saxophone, producer

Production and additional personnel

- Jacques Kralian – engineering
- Ingeborg Strobl – cover art

== Release history ==
Region	Date	Label	Format	Catalog
United States	1988	Agaric	LP	Ag 1987
United States	1998	Agaric	CD	Ag 1987
