= Demise (Missing Foundation album) =

Studio album by Missing Foundation
- Released: 1989
- Recorded: Music Box (New York City, NY)
- Genres: Industrial, post-punk
- Length: 35:17
- Label: Humanity
- Producers: Missing Foundation, Jim Waters

Missing Foundation chronology
1933 Your House Is Mine (1988)	Demise (1989)	Ignore the White Culture (1990)

Demise is the third studio album by Missing Foundation, released in 1989 by Humanity Records.

== Track listing ==
Side one
No.	Title	Length
1.	"A Hunting We Will Go"	6:36
2.	"Humanity"	4:04
3.	"292 CC"	2:30
4.	"Hate."	3:39
5.	"When Right Was Wrong"	3:19

Side two
No.	Title	Length
1.	"Liberty Under Siege"	4:24
2.	"Pistol Archive"	1:42
3.	"VKP"	3:08
4.	"Conspiracy"	0:52
5.	"Demise"	5:03

== Personnel ==
Adapted from Demise liner notes.

Missing Foundation

- Mark Ashwill – instruments
- Chris Egan – instruments
- adam nodelman;-instruments
- Florian Langmaack – instruments
- Peter Missing – instruments-vocals

Production and additional personnel

- Missing Foundation – production
- Jim Waters – production

== Release history ==
Region	Date	Label	Format	Catalog
United States	1989	Humanity	LP	
United States	1990	Restless	CD, CS	7 72390
