= Asbestos Shake =

Studio album by Borbetomagus and Voice Crack
- Released: 1991
- Recorded: December 12, 1990
- Studio: The Stutz (Zürich, CH)
- Genre: Free improvisation
- Length: 54:12
- Label: Agaric

Borbetomagus chronology
Snuff Jazz (1989)	Asbestos Shake (1991)	Buncha Hair That Long (1992)

Professional ratings
Review scores
Source	Rating
Allmusic	3/5 stars

Asbestos Shake is a collaborative studio album by Borbetomagus and Voice Crack, released in 1991 by Agaric Records.

== Track listing ==
All music is composed by Don Dietrich, Andy Guhl, Donald Miller, Norbert Möslang, Knut Remond and Jim Sauter.

No.	Title	Length
1.	"1"	15:53
2.	"2"	10:12
3.	"3"	4:29
4.	"4"	7:32
5.	"5"	8:35
6.	"6"	7:31

== Personnel ==
Adapted from Asbestos Shake liner notes.

Musicians

- Don Dietrich – saxophone
- Andy Guhl – electronics
- Donald Miller – electric guitar
- Norbert Möslang – electronics, mixing
- Knut Remond – percussion, electronics
- Jim Sauter – saxophone

Production and additional personnel

- Alex Hanimann – cover art
- Andy Rathgeb – recording

== Release history ==
Region	Date	Label	Format	Catalog
United States	1991	Agaric	CD	Ag 1989
