= Barbed Wire Maggots =

Studio album by Borbetomagus
- Released: 1983
- Recorded: May 7, 1982
- Studio: In Roads (New York City, NY)
- Genre: Free improvisation, free jazz
- Length: 43:31
- Label: Agaric

Borbetomagus chronology
Borbetomagus (1982)	Barbed Wire Maggots (1983)	At In Roads (1983)

Professional ratings
Review scores
Source	Rating
Allmusic	4/5 stars

Barbed Wire Maggots is the fourth studio album by Borbetomagus, released in 1983 by Agaric Records.

== Track listing ==
Side one
No.	Title	Length
1.	"[untitled]"	21:44

Side two
No.	Title	Length
1.	"[untitled]"	21:47

== Personnel ==
Adapted from Barbed Wire Maggots liner notes.

Borbetomagus

- Don Dietrich – saxophone
- Donald Miller – electric guitar, cover art
- Jim Sauter – saxophone

Production and additional personnel

- Larry Alexander – assistant engineer
- Don Sigal – assistant producer

== Release history ==
Region	Date	Label	Format	Catalog
United States	1983	Agaric	LP	Ag 1983
United States	2005	Agaric	CD	Ag 1983
