= Borbeto Jam =

Studio album by Borbetomagus and Friends
- Released: 1985
- Recorded: October 18, 1981
- Studio: Nyack Sound Studio (New York City, NY)
- Genre: Free improvisation
- Length: 39:36
- Label: Cadence Jazz
- Producer: Bob Rusch

Borbetomagus chronology
Zurich (1985)	Borbeto Jam (1985)	Live in Allentown (1985)

Professional ratings
Review scores
Source	Rating
Allmusic	3/5 stars

Borbeto Jam is the sixth studio album by the jazz band Borbetomagus. It was released in 1985 through Cadence Jazz Records.

== Track listing ==
Side one
No.	Title	Length
1.	"Concordat 12"	6:25
2.	"Concordat 13"	11:27
3.	"Concordat 14"	3:50

Side two
No.	Title	Length
1.	"Concordat 15"	17:54

== Personnel ==
Adapted from Borbeto Jam liner notes.

Borbetomagus

- Don Dietrich – saxophone
- Donald Miller – electric guitar
- Jim Sauter – saxophone

Additional musicians

- Milo Fine – piano, clarinet, drums, whistle
- Tristan Honsinger – cello, voice
- Toshinori Kondo – trumpet
- Peter Kowald – bass guitar

Production and additional personnel

- Larry Alexander – recording
- Katherine Joyce – cover art
- Tom Lord – executive producer
- Bob Rusch – producer

== Release history ==
Region	Date	Label	Format	Catalog
United States	1985	Cadence Jazz	LP	CJR 1026
