= New York Performances =

Live album by Borbetomagus
- Released: 1986
- Recorded: June 28 – September 21, 1986
- Studio: Various: ABC No Ric; (New York City, NY); Alchemical Theater; (New York City, NY)
- Genre: Free improvisation
- Length: 49:12
- Label: Agaric

Borbetomagus chronology
Live in Allentown (1985)	New York Performances (1986)	Fish That Sparkling Bubble (1988)

New York Performances is a live performance album by Borbetomagus, released in 1986 by Agaric Records.

== Track listing ==
Side one
No.	Title	Length
1.	"[untitled]"	10:40
2.	"[untitled]"	14:20

Side two
No.	Title	Length
1.	"[untitled]"	17:46
2.	"[untitled]"	6:26

== Personnel ==
Adapted from New York Performances liner notes.

Borbetomagus

- Don Dietrich – saxophone, cover art
- Donald Miller – electric guitar
- Jim Sauter – saxophone

Production and additional personnel

- Louis Fleck – engineering
- Kenn Michael – photography

== Release history ==
Region	Date	Label	Format	Catalog
United States	1986	Agaric	LP	Ag 1986
