= John McBryde =

John McBryde may refer to:

- John McLaren McBryde (1841–1923), president of Virginia Tech, 1891–1907
- John McBryde (field hockey) (born 1939), Australian former field hockey player
- John H. McBryde (born 1931), United States federal judge

== See also ==
- John McBride (disambiguation)
