= Industrial Strength (album) =

Studio album by Borbetomagus and Friends
- Released: 1983
- Recorded: October 18, 1981
- Studio: Nyack Sound Studio (New York City, NY)
- Genre: Free improvisation
- Length: 40:54
- Label: Leo

Borbetomagus chronology
At In Roads (1983)	Industrial Strength (1983)	Zurich (1985)

Professional ratings
Review scores
Source	Rating
Allmusic	4/5 stars

Industrial Strength is the fifth studio album by the avant garde band Borbetomagus. It was released in 1983 through Leo Records.

== Track listing ==
Side one
No.	Title	Length
1.	"Improv. 3"	19:43

Side two
No.	Title	Length
1.	"Improv. 7"	3:49
2.	"Improv. 4"	6:50
3.	"Improv. 8"	10:32

== Personnel ==
Adapted from Industrial Strength liner notes.

Borbetomagus

- Don Dietrich – saxophone
- Donald Miller – electric guitar
- Jim Sauter – saxophone

Additional musicians

- Milo Fine – piano, clarinet
- Tristan Honsinger – cello, voice
- Toshinori Kondo – trumpet, voice
- Peter Kowald – bass guitar

== Release history ==
Region	Date	Label	Format	Catalog
United States	1983	Leo	LP	LR 113
