= Theodore Ward Barrow =

American art historian and skateboarder

Ted Barrow
- Born: Theodore Ward Barrow; United States
- Education: Ph.D. The Graduate Center, City University of New York
- Website: Berate the Birds

Theodore Ward Barrow, also known as Ted Barrow, is an American art historian, writer, professor, skateboarding critic, social media persona, lecturer, and skateboarder.

== Creative practice ==
=== This Old Ledge ===
Barrow hosts, researches, and produces a series of videos on Thrasher Magazine's Youtube Channel, titled This Old Ledge, that explore the built and cultural history of past and present skate spots. Unlike other videos, that list tricks chronologically, This Old Ledge considers architectural and urban history as factors that impact the history of skateboarding, illustrated by archival photos and video clips.

=== Feedback TS ===
Barrow ran a satirical Instagram account about skateboarding and culture, @feedback_ts. Barrow built his following critiquing submitted video clips from skaters skating in skate parks. Feedback TS was no longer accepting clips but has returned to his critiques, also posting on his stories about works of art. @feedback_ts was terminated by Instagram in late 2020.

=== Writing ===
In addition to posting his writing and thoughts on instagram via the Feedback TS account, Barrow writes about a range of topics including skateboarding history, art history, and the relationship between the two. Barrow often uses the stories feature in Instagram to reach his audience. Barrow has contributed writing to a variety of publications including The New York Times, Jenkem, Skateism, Transworld Skateboarding, Smithsonian Associates, Bucknell University Press, and the Boscobel House.

In 2019, Barrow released a zine, titled "Man Proposes God Disposes," and a guest deck both with StrangeLove skateboards.

==== On skateparks ====
One avenue of Barrow's critical discourse analyzes the changing use of skateparks, highlighting a generational shift between skateboarders raised on the pre-built terrain of skateparks and those raised before the proliferation of skateparks. Barrow explains that "skateparks have always been designed to contain an activity that is about roaming, and often dangerous, or at least unlawful trespassing... As skateparks themselves have proliferated, they have become more central to that idea of performance, both fashionable and athletic”

=== Public speaking ===
In 2019, the Brooklyn Patch reached out to Barrow for his opinions on the Tompkins Square Park turfing controversy. Also in 2019, Barrow spoke at the Pushing Boarder conference in Malmö during the Tech Will Save Us panel. Additionally, Barrow moderated a panel titled: What We Do is Secret: The Challenge of Writing about Skateboarding, at the 2018 Pushing Boarders conference held in London.

== Teaching career ==
Barrow has taught at Baruch, City College, the College of Staten Island, Brooklyn College, Cooper Union, and Barnard Pre-College.
