= Adam Nodelman =

American bassist

- Born: April 12th, 1966; New York City, U.S.
- Died: August 25, 2008 Woodstock, New York, U.S.
- Genres: Post-punk, experimental rock
- Occupation: Musician
- Instrument: Bass guitar
- Years active: 1984–2008

Adam Nodelman (1966 – 2008) was an American bassist. A native of Nyack, NY, he was known for his contributions to the jazz trio Borbetomagus, hardcore punk band, Borscht, and also worked with Motherhead Bug, Crash Worship, Missing Foundation, Sunburned Hand of the Man and Sulfur. He died in 2008 at the age of forty-three.

== Discography ==
Borbetomagus

- Live in Allentown (1985)
- Fish That Sparkling Bubble (1988)
- Seven Reasons for Tears (1989)

Missing Foundation

- Missing Foundation (1987)

Guest appearances

- Motherhead Bug: Zambodia (1993)
