= East Villager =

The East Villager was a newspaper published monthly in New York City by Everything for Everybody, a group founded by Jack Scully.

== Background ==
Targeting the neighborhood for which it was named, East Village, Manhattan, the paper's masthead stated that it had been published monthly since June 1966 and said of itself, "No One Slighted, Nothing Overlooked." Notable editors included Heidi Boghosian, presently executive director of the National Lawyers Guild, and Steven Vincent, an author and journalist who was abducted and murdered while working freelance in Iraq in 2005.

From 1974 to 1977 the newspaper had been called "Everything for Everybody" which was edited by Alec Clayton and published out of the organization's West Village branch at 406 West 13th Street. Clayton is now a novelist and freelance writer in Olympia, Washington.

== Controversy ==
The paper was criticized by some and supported by others as it took a somewhat more conservative turn under editor Steven Vincent, who was said to oppose the neighborhood squatters who had moved into vacant buildings and the "Tent City" of homeless people in Tompkins Square Park. Vincent was also a key organizer of the successful effort to elect Antonio Pagan, one of New York City's first openly gay councilpersons and a conservative Democrat who would later support Mayor Rudy Giuliani.
