= Go into Exile =

Studio album by Missing Foundation
- Released: June 2, 1992
- Recorded: Music Box (New York City, NY)
- Genre: Industrial, post-punk
- Length: 67:16
- Label: Restless
- Producer: Missing Foundation, Jim Waters

Missing Foundation chronology
Ignore the White Culture (1990)	Go into Exile (1992)

Go into Exile is the fifth album by Missing Foundation, released in 1992 by Restless Records.

== Track listing ==
No.	Title	Length
1.	"Assault on Your Life"	4:18
2.	"World Peace Is Dead"	7:14
3.	"Party's Just Begun"	5:33
4.	"Parade of Pain"	5:07
5.	"Shunga Satori"	3:16
6.	"I Wait"	4:46
7.	"Go into Exile"	2:43
8.	"Take Take Take"	6:07
9.	"No Return"	5:15
10.	"Lost: 1994 (New World Order)"	22:37

== Personnel ==
Adapted from Go into Exile liner notes.

Missing Foundation

- Mark Ashwill – drums-metal
- Chris Egan – drums, photography
- Florian Langmaack – drums
- Peter Missing – drums-metal-vocals
- adam nodleman-bass
- Mark Laramie (Laramee) – Bass and Guitar

Production and additional personnel

- Missing Foundation – production
- Jim Waters – production

== Release history ==
Region	Date	Label	Format	Catalog
United States	1992	Restless	CD	7 72594
