= Missing Foundation =

Industrial music and performance art project

- Origin: Hamburg, Germany
- Genres: Industrial, Electronic
- Years active: 1984–present
- Labels: Restless, Dais Records; Humanity Records
- Members: Peter Missing; Florian Langmaack Cyril Mazard, Joshua Slusher; Lawry Zilmrah; Weasel Walter; Joseph I
- Past members: Mark Ashwill; Chris Egan; En Esch; Sascha Konietzko; Florian Langmaack; Jim Moffitt; Mark Laramee; Adam Nodelman ChazBones23 Cardoza

Missing Foundation is an industrial music and performance art project started in the late 1980s and led by Peter Missing. Their live shows were notorious for sparking civil disobedience (including the occasional riot) and causing serious damage to venues at which they performed. The group was also infamous for their "The Party's Over" graffiti of an upside-down martini glass, and was heavily involved in the Tompkins Square Park Riot in August 1988. While the band continued to produce music and concerts, a small anarchist social movement continued to exist under the same name for several years.

== History ==
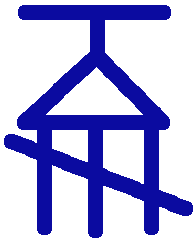
Party's over logo

The earliest incarnation of the group, which was founded in Hamburg in 1984 by Peter Missing, included Sascha Konietzko and En Esch of industrial act KMFDM, who were only with Missing Foundation briefly before going their own way.

After Missing moved back to New York City in 1985, he started a new version of the group, and the line-up became more stable, with a core group of Missing, Florian Langmaack, Adam Nodelman, Chris Egan, and Mark Ashwill. The band's second album, 1933 Your House Is Mine, was released in 1988, when the band's social-unrest-fomenting activities began to increase dramatically. The group's upside-down martini logo had been spray painted all over the East Village that year. At a show in mid-1988 in New York, the group doused oil barrels in kerosene and set them on fire, then rolled them into the audience, causing major damage to CBGB, the club where they were performing. In a July 31 protest, one of the band members was arrested. A week later, Missing helped organize another initially peaceful protest at Tompkins Square Park, which grew violent after the band performed a concert.

The group's biggest cultural impact, other than their disruptive live performances, was the creation of their infamous "The Party's Over" image of an upside-down martini glass, which became a symbol for political and social dissent. The logo was part of a major graffiti campaign in New York's Lower East Side during the band's residence in the city. An accompanying phrase, 1933–1988, was added as a way to draw comparisons between contemporary New York and the Weimar Republic.

After releasing 21 albums, the group continues to produce new music and Missing initially moved to Berlin, then relocated to Copenhagen.

In 2013, Dais Records reissued the first two Missing Foundation albums, Missing Foundation and 1933 Your House Is Mine, in a limited-edition vinyl format. In 2018 the entire discography of Missing Foundation was released under Humanity Records on Bandcamp.

== Musical style ==
Missing Foundation patterned itself after early industrial acts such as Throbbing Gristle and Einsturzende Neubauten. The group used a variety of found metal objects to create its percussion, and only rarely used traditional instruments such as guitars. Lead vocalist Missing often shouted through a bullhorn, on many occasions because the club owners had turned off the in-house speaker system. Missing and his cohorts were once described as "a scattered collection of anarchists and antigentrification militants".

== Discography ==
All albums released on Restless Records, unless noted.

- Missing Foundation (1987)
- 1933 Your House Is Mine (1988)
- Demise (1989)
- Ignore the White Culture (1990)
- Go into Exile (1992)
- Just Another Hit (1993) eye yamasuka self-released
- Electronic Collection (2010) Humanity Records
- Live In La Plaza N.Y.C. (2016) self-released
- Nature Is Watching You (2018) self-released
- World In Chains (2019) self-released
- Hard Surface (2021, self-released)
- River Of Creative Forms (2022) Humanity Records
