= Howl Festival =

Event

The Howl Festival (sometimes styled Howl! Festival or HOWL! Festival) was an event that took place in Manhattan's Tompkins Square Park. It was founded in 2003 and held each spring through 2013 as a celebration of the arts history of the East Village and the Lower East Side. It was named for and inspired by Allen Ginsberg's poem Howl and Other Poems and the Festival honors Ginsberg. From 2004-2006, the managing director was Greg Fuchs.

The 2014 Festival was postponed indefinitely due to issues surrounding the permits for and use of the Park.

Howl Arts Inc., an arts organization with a permanent location in the East Village, emerged in part from the Howl Festival. Its work includes carrying forward some of the programming that was formerly a part of the Howl Festival, including an annual celebration marking Allen Ginsberg's birthday among other programs that celebrate the cultural history of the East Village and Lower East Side.
