= Borbetomagus =

Free jazz/noise rock band

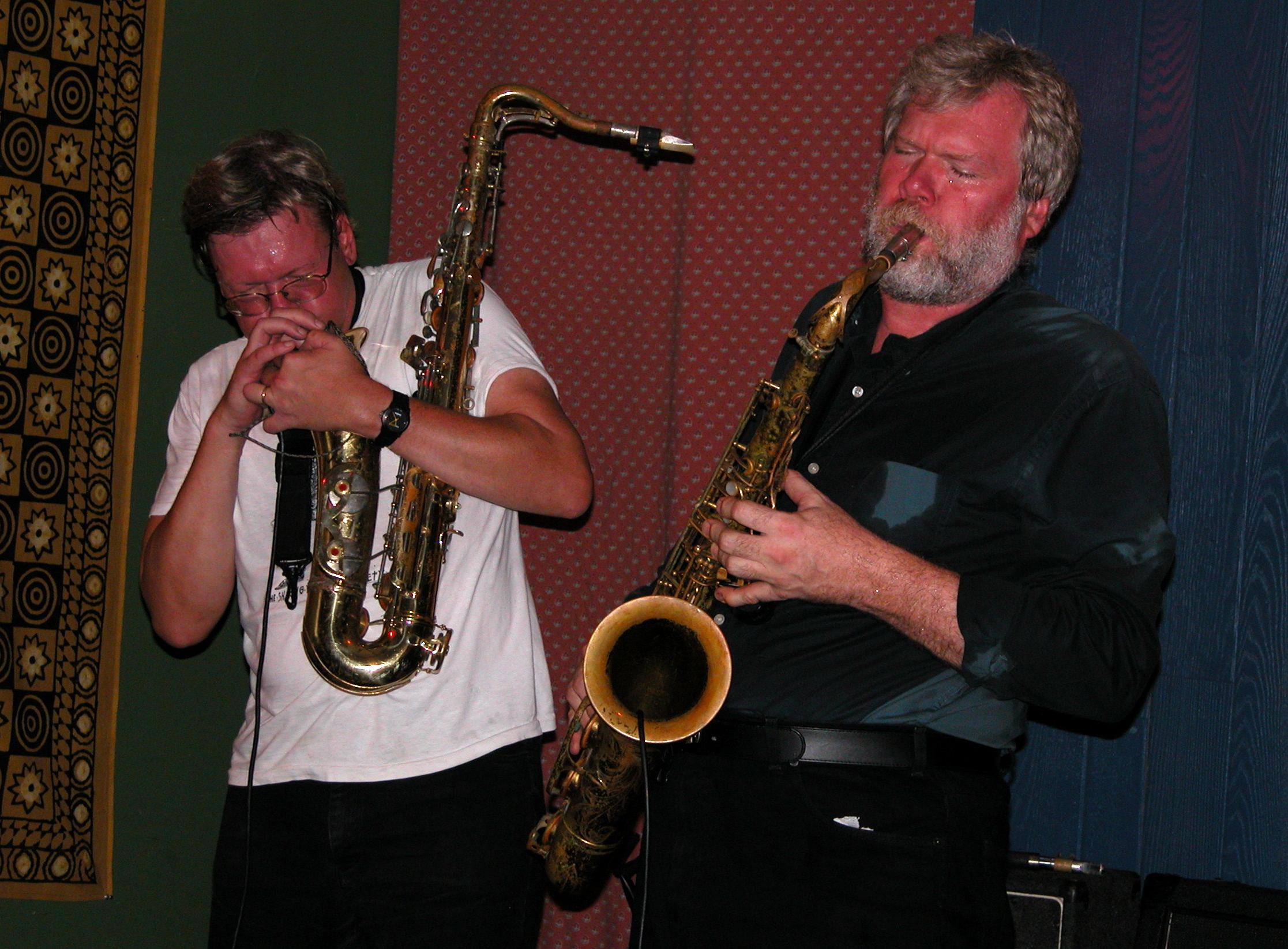
- Don Dietrich and Jim Sauter

Background information
- Genres: Free jazz, noise rock
- Years active: 1979—present
- Label: Agaric
- Members: Don Dietrich; Donald Miller; Jim Sauter
- Past members: Adam Nodelman
- Website: borbetomagus.com

Borbetomagus are a free jazz/noise rock group. They are cited by critics as pioneers of aggressive improvised noise music.

== Biography ==
Borbetomagus formed in 1979 when saxophone players Jim Sauter and Don Dietrich joined with electric guitarist Donald Miller. Sauter and Deitrich were fans of and frequent callers to Miller's radio show on WKCR (Columbia University) which lead to them collaborating. Bass guitarist Adam Nodelman was briefly a member, and they have occasionally collaborated with others.

Their aggressive music has been described as "a huge, overpowering, take-no-prisoners mass of sound." One extended technique they use is called "bells together" where Sauter and Dietrich place the bells (openings) of their saxophones against one other while playing.

While the core trio listed above has been responsible for most of Borbetomagus's music, they have collaborated with Swiss circuit bending duo Voice Crack, Dutch cellist Tristan Honsinger, German double-bassist Peter Kowald, multi-instrumentalist Milo Fine, the band Fat on their album Hit, and others. In 2006, they recorded a collaborative album with Hijokaidan live at the Festival International de Musique Actuelle de Victoriaville, Canada, and in 2007 their long out-of-print cassette Live In Allentown was released on CD with nearly twice as much material as the original. Sauter and Dietrich have also recorded a duo album and a collaborative album with Sonic Youth guitarist Thurston Moore. Miller died in 2024 at age 62.

== Name ==
Borbetomagus refers to the Celtic origin of the German city of Worms.

== Influence ==
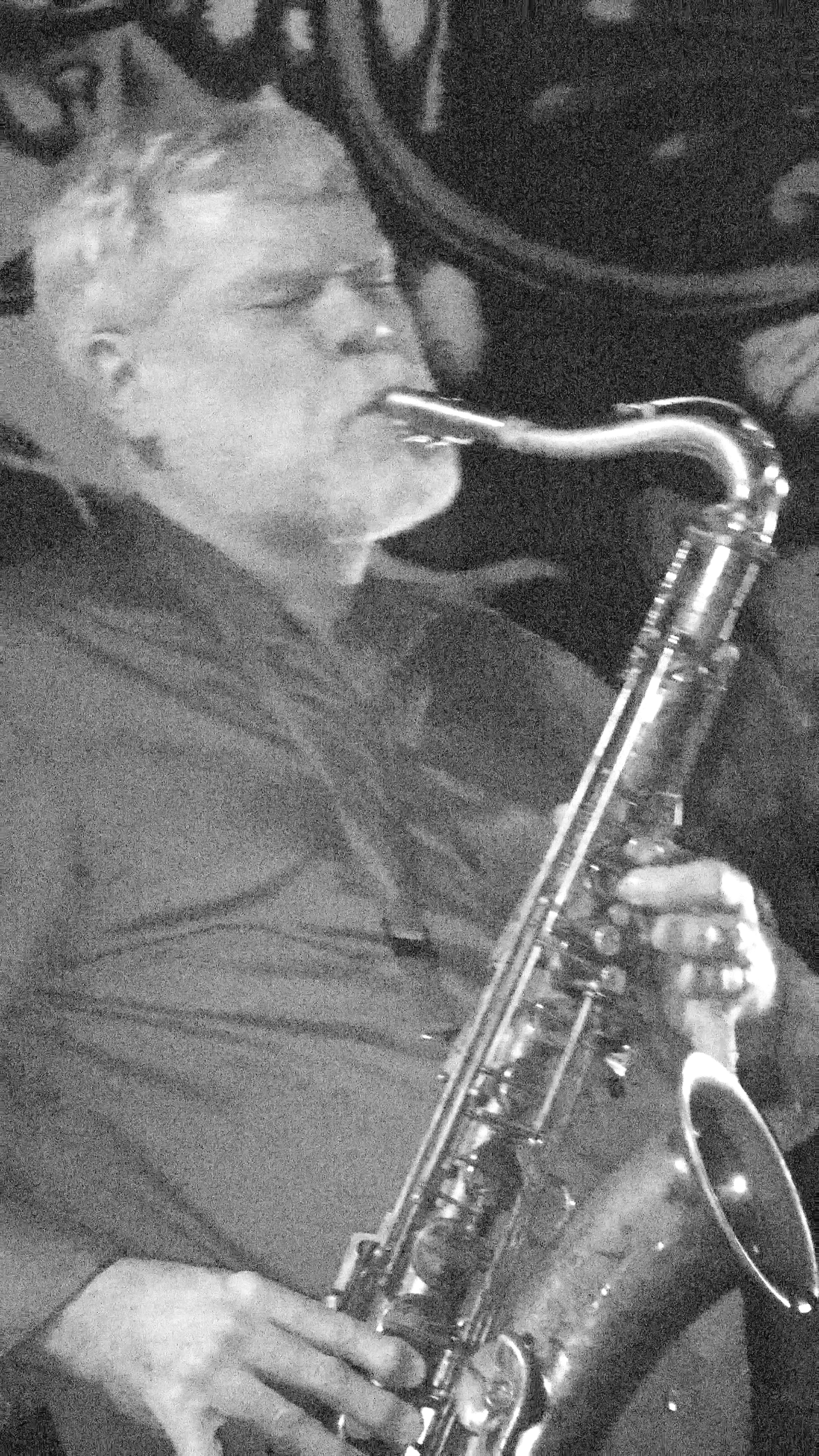
Jim Sauter performing at Palisades

They are considered widely influential on the Japanese noise music scene, as demonstrated by the re-release of their limited Live At Inroads cassette on CD by the Japanese label P.S.F. Records, as well as having a CD released by Osaka-based noise label Alchemy Records.

They have been influential on many American rock, free jazz, and noise musicians, such as Sonic Youth, Pelt, Thomas Ankersmit, and Kevin Drumm. Miller has worked with Pelt; he resided in New Orleans for many years, where he frequently collaborated live with Rob Cambre and others on E-Bowed guitars.

== Discography ==
- Borbetomagus (Agaric 1980)
- Work on What Has Been Spoiled (Agaric 1981)
- Borbetomagus (Agaric 1982)
- At In Roads (Sound Cluster 1982, Cause And Effect, P.S.F PSFD-19 1993)
- Industrial Strength (Leo LR113 1983)
- Barbed Wire Maggots (Agaric 1983)
- Borbeto Jam (Cadence CJR 1026)
- Zurich (Agaric 1984)
- Bells Together (Agaric 1985)
- New York Performances (Agaric 1986)
- Live in Allentown (LowLife LL02 1986, Agaric 1998)
- Seven Reasons for Tears (Purge Sound League 027, Agaric 1993)
- Fish That Sparkling Bubble (Agaric 1987 / Uhlang Produktion UP 06) with Voice Crack
- Snuff Jazz (Agaric 1988, 1990)
- Barefoot in the Head (Forced Exposure 1990) with Thurston Moore and liner notes purportedly by Thomas Pynchon
- Asbestos Shake (Agaric 1989, Uhlang Produktion UP 08, V-Records V2) with Voice Crack
- Buncha Hair That Long (Agaric 1990)
- Coelacanth (Agaric 1991) with Shaking Ray Levis
- Experience the Magic (Agaric 1992)
- L'Atlas Des Galaxies Etranges (Non Mi Piace NMPR 01 OK, 1993)
- Live in Tokyo (Alchemy ARCD-095)
- Songs Our Mother Taught Us (Agaric 1995)
- Both Noise Ends Burning (Les Disques Victo 2007) with Hijokaidan
- Borbetomagus à Go Go (Agaric 1997)
- The Rape of Atlanta (Eyedrum 2010)
- Trente belles années (Agaric 2012)
- Vole Lotta Love (Tyyfus/Verdura 2013)
- The Eastcote Studios Session (Dancing Wayang 2016)
