= Steven Vincent =

American author and journalist (1955-2005)

Steven Charles Vincent (December 31, 1955 – August 2, 2005) was an American author and journalist. In 2005 he was working as a freelance journalist in Basra, Iraq, reporting for The Christian Science Monitor, National Review, Mother Jones, Reason, Front Page and American Enterprise, among other publications, when he was abducted and murdered in southern Iraq after investigating corruption by Shia militias.

== Early life ==
Vincent was born in Washington, DC, but his family would soon move to northern California. The family spent four years in Palo Alto before moving to Sunnyvale, now the heart of Silicon Valley, in 1960. He graduated from Homestead High School in 1974, went to the University of California, Santa Barbara, then to University of California, Berkeley, from which he graduated summa cum laude with a degree in English and Philosophy. After a summer spent traveling around Europe, he hitchhiked to New York in 1980 to pursue a writing career, supporting himself by taking a series of jobs in the restaurant industry, driving a cab and doing temp work.

== Writing career ==
His first professional experience came when he was offered the editorship of a local newspaper, The East Villager. From 1984 to 1991 he wrote, edited, laid out and oversaw the publication of each month's edition; during his tenure he also became deeply involved in local issues, and successfully used the paper as a forum to influence neighborhood politics. In the late 1980s he began his career as a writer of fiction and essays, publishing in various literary magazines and booklets. In 1997, he received a Dactyl Foundation Award for his essay on Pop Art, "Listening to Pop." He also self-published two issues of a poetry magazine, The Plowman. In 1990 he was hired by Art+Auction magazine, where he quickly became the senior writer, specializing in investigative stories of art theft, fraud, counterfeiting and malfeasance. After an abortive six-month stint at The Wall Street Journal, he returned to Art+Auction as a freelancer until his death.

After watching United Flight 175 crash into the World Trade Center on September 11, 2001, and the subsequent collapse of the Twin Towers, Vincent scaled back his art critic job to write instead about what he considered more timely and pressing issues. In 2003, after learning that his friend, the artist Steve Mumford, had gone to Baghdad following the start of the Iraq War, Vincent went as well, first in 2003, then again in 2004, operating freely as a journalist, traveling through the country without so much as a cell phone, interviewing the local populace, observing the reality of life on the ground. In 2004, he would publish In the Red Zone: A Journey Into the Soul of Iraq, as well as a blog about his travels.

Vincent returned to Iraq in April 2005, this time to the south, basing himself in Basra as the only Western journalist in the region. Initially he pursued stories such as the reconstruction of the marshlands drained by Saddam Hussein, but in the process of meeting and speaking to locals on all levels, from people in the street to government officials, he uncovered and began investigating reports of Iran's growing logistical and financial support for the local insurgency and the unchecked movement over the border of Iranian agents, drug smuggling to support the area's militias, the killing of Basra's Christian populace, increasing corruption and violence in the local police force and the inexplicable unwillingness of the British forces stationed there to address such dangerous issues.

== Death ==
On August 2, 2005, three months to the day after he had arrived in Iraq, Vincent and his translator Nouriya Itais Wadi went to a Basra money exchange after spending the day doing interviews; when they came back out, they were kidnapped off the street in broad daylight by men in police uniforms driving a white police truck. They were bound, gagged, taken to an undisclosed location where for five hours they were beaten and interrogated, then taken to the outskirts of town and shot. They were found by British and Iraqi policemen but Vincent was dead, shot in the back at close range. Wadi survived despite having been shot three times, since she was farther from the truck when their captors opened fire. It is generally accepted that Vincent was murdered because of his criticism of religious extremism in the area, expressed three days before his murder in "Switched Off in Basra", a July 31 op-ed for The New York Times, in which he noted the increasing infiltration of the Basra police force by Islamic extremists loyal to Muqtada al Sadr.

Vincent is buried in Brooklyn's Green-Wood Cemetery; his widow, Lisa Ramaci-Vincent, to whom he was married from 1992 until his death, still lives in Manhattan. They had lived together in the East Village. Two months after Vincent's murder, she established the Steven Vincent Foundation in his memory; the foundation donates money to the families of indigenous journalists, translators, drivers and other media workers and aides killed simply because of the job they are doing. In 2007, after 18 months of working with the US Embassy in Baghdad, the State Department, the International Rescue Committee, the United Nations High Commission for Refugees and Senator Edward Kennedy's Iraq Refugee Crisis Committee, she was successful in bringing Vincent's translator Nouriya to safety and asylum in New York.

In November 2006, Vincent was posthumously awarded the Kurt Schork Award for International Journalism for his article uncovering police death squads, which the press release called "the most sensitive story possible."
