= 1988 Tompkins Square Park riot =

Riot and civil disorder in New York City

Tompkins Square Park riot
- Date: August 6–7, 1988
- Location: New York City; 40°43′43″N 73°58′53″W
- Goals: Opposition to gentrification, homelessness, park curfew
- Methods: Riot, protest, demonstration

Parties
Protesters, reporters	New York City Police Department

Number
200	450

Casualties and losses
35 injured, 9 arrested	3 injured
- Tompkins Square Park's location in New York City

The Tompkins Square Park riot occurred on August 6–7, 1988, in Tompkins Square Park, located in the Alphabet City section of the East Village neighborhood in Manhattan, New York City. Groups of "drug pushers, homeless people and young people known as squatters and punks," had largely taken over the park. The East Village and Alphabet City communities were divided about what, if anything, should be done about it. The local governing body, Manhattan Community Board 3, recommended, and the New York City Parks Department adopted a 1 a.m. curfew for the previously 24-hour park, in an attempt to bring it under control. On July 31, a protest rally against the curfew saw several clashes between protesters and police.

Another rally was held on August 6. Here, the police charged a crowd of protesters, and a riot ensued. Bystanders, activists, police officers, neighborhood residents and journalists were caught up in the violence. Despite a brief lull in the fighting, the melee continued until 6 a.m. the next day. Mayor Ed Koch temporarily rescinded the curfew. The neighborhood, previously divided over how to deal with the park, was unanimous in its condemnation of the heavy-handed actions of the police.

Over 100 complaints of police brutality were lodged following the riot. Much blame was laid on poor police handling and the commander of the precinct in charge was deprived of office for a year. In an editorial entitled "Yes, a Police Riot", The New York Times commended Commissioner Benjamin Ward and the New York City Police Department for their candor in a report that confirmed what ubiquitous media images made clear: the NYPD were responsible for inciting a riot.

== Background ==
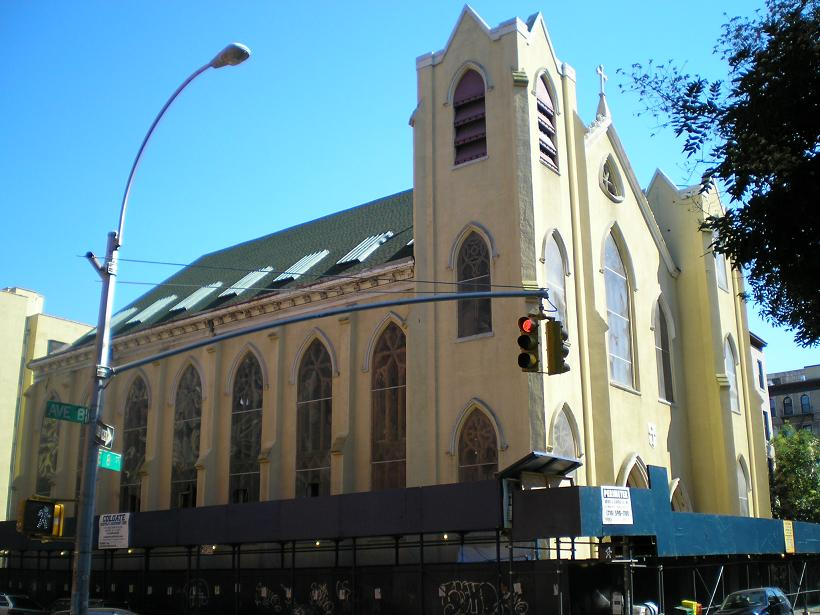
St. Brigid's Church on Avenue B overlooks Tompkins Square Park. It served as a place for protesters to organize and receive medical attention during the riot.

After the Tompkins Square Riot of 1874, the park held a symbolic place in the New York labor movement. In the years leading up to 1988, the East Village — and Tompkins Square Park in particular — had become a gathering place and home for the wayward and contingents of the homeless and rowdy youth, growing into a large tent city.

Neighborhood residents, voicing their preferences through at least four community organizations, had differing perspectives on the evolving nature of the park, and what actions should or should not be taken. The Avenue A Block Association (made up of local businesses) insisted a curfew be introduced. Other groups such as Friends of Tompkins Square Park and political organizers on the poorer east side of the park preferred that no curfew be imposed, and Manhattan Community Board 3 took the middle ground.

On June 28, 1988, the Community Board 3 approved a report that included a proposal for a 1 a.m. curfew. While there was some controversy about how well-informed the voting board members were, board manager Martha Danziger affirmed the validity of the decision. The New York City Parks Department later adopted the curfew. Park workers painted a warning on the ground days after the Association made its decision. On July 11 the police, under the direction of Captain Gerald McNamara of the 9th Precinct, confined homeless people to the park's southeast quadrant, and evicted all others. They closed the park down periodically over the next two weeks.

== Riot ==
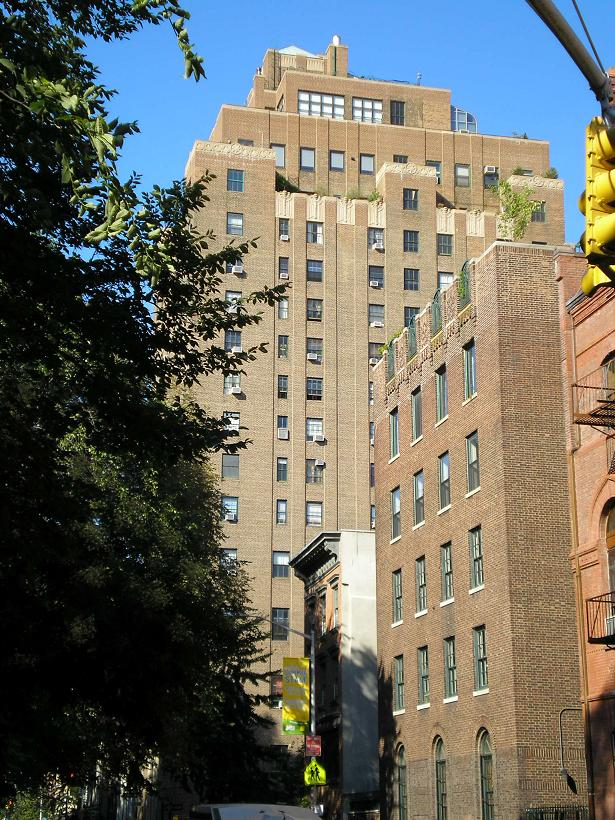
Christodora House, for many the first sign of East Village gentrification, and scene of the riot

=== Initial rally and protests ===
Though the park was a de facto homeless shelter, some residents considered the police department's actions an attempt to take the park away from the public. Protests were organized and a rally called for July 31. That night, police entered the park in response to alleged noise complaints, and by the end of the call several civilians and six officers were treated for injuries, and four men were arrested on charges of reckless endangerment and inciting to riot. Sarah Lewison, an eyewitness, said the protest was over rumors of a midnight curfew at the park and another witness, John McDermott, said the police provoked the melee. Angry organizers planned another rally for August 6.

=== Escalation ===
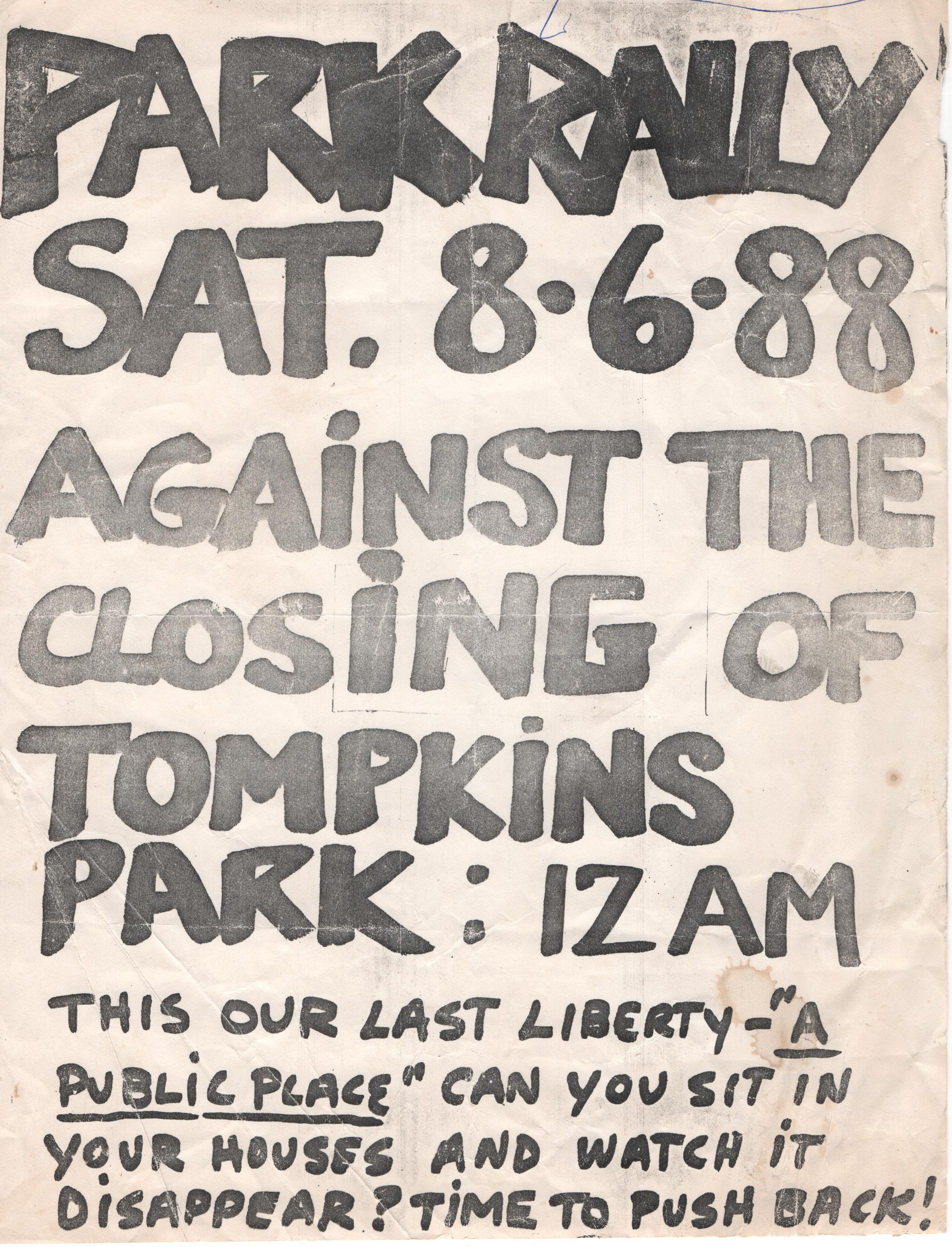
Flyer for the August 6, 1988 Tompkins Square Park rally.

On August 6, police were present to meet the protesters. "It's time to bring a little law and order back to the park and restore it to the legitimate members of the community," said Captain McNamara. "We don't want to get into a situation where we under-police something like this and it turns into a fiasco."

The city was on edge and in the midst of this, the park was turned into what Times reporter McFadden described as a bloody "war zone." Around 11:30 p.m., 150 or 200 (police estimates were 700) protesters came through the St. Mark's Place entrance to the park, holding banners proclaiming "Gentrification is Class War". By the time dawn broke, 38 people, including reporters and police officers, suffered injuries. In total, nine people were arrested on riot, assault and other charges, and six complaints of police brutality were logged with the Civilian Complaint Review Board.

=== Police actions ===
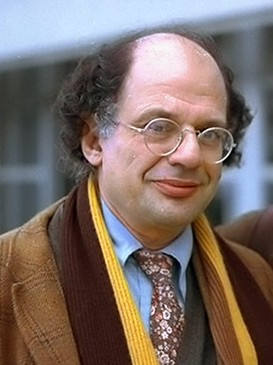
Allen Ginsberg was an eyewitness to the riots

Although bottles were reportedly thrown, it was the police who charged the crowd. Despite NYPD protestations that their actions were measured, "The police panicked and were beating up bystanders who had done nothing wrong and were just observing," said poet Allen Ginsberg, a local resident and witness. Captain McNamara countered, "We did everything in our power not to provoke an incident. They didn't charge the crowd until the bricks and bottles started flying." New York Times photographer Angel Franco saw the police beat a couple who emerged from a grocery store; when he tried to take photographs, an officer clubbed him. A New York Daily News reporter, Natalie Byfield, was also clubbed on the head. Both were wearing cards identifying them as the press. Jeff Dean Kuipers, a reporter for Downtown Magazine, was clubbed after an officer told his African-American companion, Tisha Pryor, to "move along, you black nigger bitch."

[The police] ran into the crowds with horses. I saw residents pulled off their stoops ... They cracked my friend's head open. It didn't matter if you were a journalist or a resident or a storekeeper.

— Jeff Dean Kuipers, to the Newsday press

Pryor is in tears, with blood running down her neck, in a videotape made by artist Clayton Patterson. Another video made by freelance cameraman Paul Garrin shows officers swinging clubs at him and slamming him against a wall. Photographer John McBride, taking still photos of the riot that were to be published in The Village Voice, was also struck by a policeman's nightstick in the same attack taped by Garrin. Mr. Fish, a travel promoter out for an evening on the town, attempted to hail a taxi on Avenue A near Sixth Street when he was suddenly struck on the head. "I was just standing there watching," he said. "The next thing that I remember is seeing the stick, and then a young woman who was helping me." Patterson's videotape showed that no officers helped Fish until an ambulance arrived. A police helicopter hovered over the scene, contributing to a sense of chaos. Billy Erb was partying in a nearby club when he realized police had barricaded him in, "The front gates had been locked by the police, and we were all now trapped. That’s a pretty clear memory. Again, blood being a factor as we sat in the windows watching policemen with their badges covered bashing bloody heads in beyond the glass."

During a lull in the riot, a young officer on Patterson's video appealed for understanding from the protesters. He tried to calmly tell them how unhappy the police were with the assignment and its aftermath. "We've got cops back there in ambulances who've been hit." But the lull ended. Thirty to seventy protesters re-entered the park. A witness said the mob rammed a police barricade through the glass door of the Christodora House, a high-rise luxury building on Avenue B. They overturned planters and tore a lamp out of the wall, threatened residents and staff with bodily harm, and screamed and chanted "Die Yuppie Scum". At 6 a.m., the last protesters dispersed, vowing to demonstrate again.

When questioned about the brutality, Captain McNamara said, "It was a hot night. There was a lot of debris being thrown through the air. Obviously tempers flared. But all these allegations will be investigated." Mayor Ed Koch was forced to temporarily revoke the curfew.

== Aftermath ==
Eventually the brutality complaints ballooned to over 100. Video and images of "police officers striking demonstrators with nightsticks and kicking other apparently defenseless people while they were lying on the ground" were flashed continuously across the media. New York Police Commissioner Benjamin Ward issued a scathing report laying the blame for the riot squarely on the precinct. The police actions were "not well planned, staffed, supervised or executed... which culminated in a riot." Ward announced the retirement of Deputy Chief Thomas J. Darcy, who was absent from the scene and derelict in his duties. Deputy Inspector Joseph Wodarski, the senior officer at the scene in Darcy's absence, was not demoted but transferred from his prestigious post as commander of the Midtown South precinct to a "less sensitive" command. Captain McNamara, the lowest-ranking commander at the scene, was temporarily relieved of his post, but was allowed to resume command of the precinct the next year. Ward said that McNamara's actions were "not well planned, staffed, supervised or executed, [but he] acted in good faith and made judgments that were within the level of his experience," after Darcy and Wodarski failed to act.

A city review of the riot turned up numerous problems with the police department's actions that night, including a failure to contact either Commissioner Ward or Mayor Koch. In the middle of the riot the commander left the scene to go to the bathroom at the station house, several blocks away from the fighting. The police helicopter used to illuminate the area only attracted bigger crowds. Several nearby rooftops were not secured by police and were used to throw bottles and debris at people on the street. Ward said the mounted police were brought to the scene too soon and acted too rashly to confront protesters. A temporary headquarters was set up right in the middle of the park, causing officers unfamiliar with the East Village—who rushed to the scene from throughout the city—to push their way through demonstrators to reach it. Once at the headquarters, they found no high-ranking officer on duty.

=== City's reaction ===
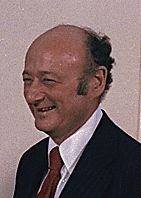
Mayor Ed Koch

Mayor Koch called the park a "cesspool" where "sandboxes are soiled with feces and urine." Koch admitted he had not seen the feces and urine himself. "There are people, hundreds of them, I'm told, who park there all 24 hours a day, and obviously there are bodily needs."

Hundreds of officers were called out on a steamy Saturday for the worst violence the city had seen in years, yet Koch did not know about it until the next day and said he did not speak to Ward about it until Monday.

Ward himself had been the subject of controversy in the past, and the riot became a cause to reflect on the negative aspects of his record as Commissioner. After 10 people were shot in Brooklyn in 1984, nobody could find him for days. He appeared drunk at a Patrolmen's Benevolent Association convention in 1984; under his watch in 1985, officers in Queens used stun guns on suspects and in 1986 officers in Brooklyn stole and sold drugs. He was lambasted in 1987 for telling African American journalists that most crime in New York City was committed by young black men and later told black ministers in reference to that remark, "our little secret is out." He told a woman who was scared about a series of rapes that she was the type of woman a rapist would go after.

It was noted that Mayor Koch held steadfast in his support of Ward. Although Koch said he was "shocked" by the videotape of the police response, as he had done in the past he refused to utter a negative word about Ward. "The day I think that a commissioner, including a police commissioner, isn't as good as he should be to run whatever he's running, that's the day I will ask him to submit his resignation," said Koch. "I think Ben Ward will go down as one of the greatest police commissioners this city has ever had. Bob McGuire is the other, and I appointed both of them." However, Koch's support eroded as evidence mounted that municipal disorganization and a lack of police leadership that night likely sparked the riots. "The film that I saw causes me to believe that there may have been an overreaction. I was not happy with what I saw on film. Those films were disturbing to me, and I think they disturbed Ben Ward as well."

Two officers were charged with use of excessive force. Officer Karen Connelly was accused of using her nightstick "wrongfully and without just cause" to strike a civilian, and Philip O'Reilly, who was accused of interfering with Times photographer Franco, and of using his nightstick to injure Franco's hand. The Civilian Complaint Review Board recommended the officers be charged, and Commissioner Ward endorsed the recommendations. The officers were tried before the Office of Administrative Trials and Hearings (OATH); in Police Department v. ÓReilly, OATH recommended that the charges against Philip ÓReilly be dismissed, while in Police Department v. Connelly OATH recommended that Karen Connelly's employment be terminated.

=== Neighborhood reactions ===
A neighborhood divided over their feelings about police were united against their aggression. "The streets were full of people who I see coming out of their houses every morning with briefcases...I mean people who work on Wall Street, and they're standing in the street screaming 'Kill the pigs!'" said Phil Van Aver, a member of Manhattan Community Board 3. Board 3 and the nonprofit social service organizations supported the goal of clearing Tompkins Square Park of the drug dealers, drunks, addicts and anti-social elements that considered it home. Instead, the police riot ripped open old wounds about brutality and the neighborhood's housing problem many longtime residents faced. "The police, by acting in the brutal fashion that they did, managed to link a small group of crazies to the legitimate sentiments of opposition to gentrification," said Valerio Orselli, director of the Cooper Square Committee, a nonprofit housing group. "Now the issue has become police brutality, not housing. It's set everyone back."

Many people relished the neighborhood as a home for society's outcasts. Getrude Briggs, owner of East 7th Street store Books 'n' Things, and a resident of forty-one years: "Of course [the East Village] still attracts a lot of freaks, because it's still a place you can be free. For a lot of kids, coming here is a way to get away from the choking atmosphere of suburbia." Thirty-year resident Barbara Shawm protested the East Village's dangerous reputation: "A 90-pound woman can easily fend off a down-and-outer or an addict. They're not dangerous. It's more dangerous uptown — what people do to each other in elevators."

== Music and the riots ==
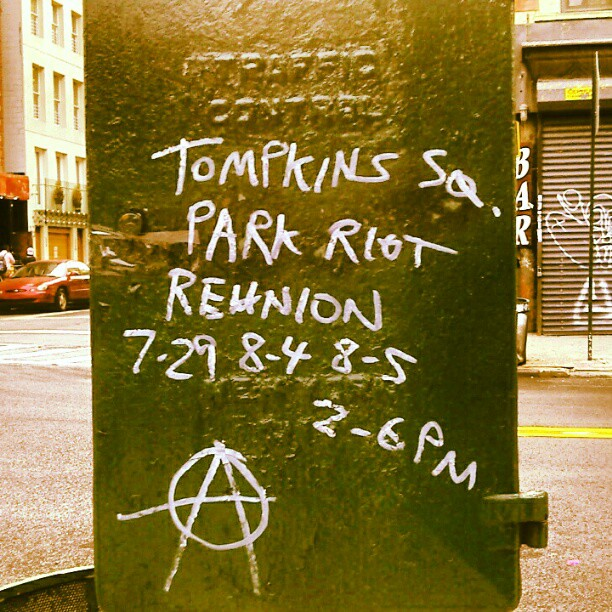
Graffiti on a traffic signal box in the East Village advertising riot reunion concerts in 2012

According to Times reporter Todd Purdum, the clash had its roots in music. News articles about the riots described some of the music groups who were involved in the melée . The New York Times quoted a handbill for The Backyards, a band looking for a drummer: "Must be dedicated, hard-hitting, in it for life. Willing to die naked in an alley for your anti-art. Outcasts and social rejects preferred but not essential." The industrial anarchist Missing Foundation were active in the riots and their logo—an overturned martini glass and "1988 - 1933"—was found everywhere on the walls of the East Village. The band's singer, Peter Missing, sang through a bullhorn and claimed industrial society was on the verge of collapse and that a police state was imminent. The overturned glass signified the band's slogan "the party's over," and the dates an allusion to the year the Nazis took over the Weimar Republic.

Lou Reed's song "Hold On", from his 1989 album New York, commemorates the riots and typifies the post-riot public outcry, in which the issue of police brutality outshined the issues of gentrification. The Undead's 1993 song "There's a Riot In Tompkins Square" also responded to the continued unrest in the area.

The Tompkins Square riots also parallel the riot scene in the Broadway play, Rent, by Jonathan Larson. The main character, Mark Cohen, films the riots which ...[made] the nightly news. Paul Garrin is the real-life person who witnessed the riots, videotaped them as he was being beaten by the police. Rent also takes place in an abandoned lot, located in Alphabet City, where the homeless people have set up a tent city.

=== Riot anniversary concerts ===
On November 7, 2004, about 1,000 people gathered in Tompkins Square Park to attend a concert by the punk band Leftöver Crack. The concert has become a yearly ritual to mark the 1988 riots. According to the NYPD, when officers attempted an arrest for an open container of alcohol, concertgoers "surrounded and assaulted" the officers. Six arrests were made on charges including assault inciting to riot. "It was a confrontation obviously. I don't know if 'riot' is the right word", said Detective Gifford, a Police Department spokesperson. Reportedly, some of the punks spit upon and jumped on officers. Beer bottles were thrown, causing some in the crowd to pour beer over fellow concertgoers. On August 6, 2006, a fight broke out in a mosh pit when Leftöver Crack again played the riot anniversary concert.

== See also ==
- List of incidents of civil unrest in New York City
- List of riots
- List of incidents of civil unrest in the United States
- Protest
