= Zurich (Borbetomagus album) =

Live album by Borbetomagus
- Released: 1984
- Recorded: October 13, 1984
- Studio: Rote Fabrik (Zürich, CH)
- Genre: Free improvisation
- Length: 75:01
- Label: Agaric

Borbetomagus chronology
Industrial Strength (1983)	Zurich (1984)	Borbeto Jam (1985)

Professional ratings
Review scores
Source	Rating
Allmusic	3/5 stars

Zurich is a live performance album by Borbetomagus, released in 1984 by Agaric Records.

== Track listing ==
Side one
No.	Title	Length
1.	"Fleetwood DeKooning"	18:00

Side two
No.	Title	Length
1.	"Pink Pants"	2:50
2.	"Ohne Fleisch Loaf"	4:32
3.	"Ms. Fisch Brotchen"	5:31
4.	"Fried Tampons"	3:42

Side three
No.	Title	Length
1.	"Schwarma Death"	7:43
2.	"Nein Is the Loneliest Number"	10:47

Side four
No.	Title	Length
1.	"Elaine DeFleetwood"	21:56

== Personnel ==
Adapted from Zurich liner notes.

Borbetomagus

- Don Dietrich – tenor saxophone, alto saxophone, electric guitar (B4)
- Donald Miller – electric guitar, alto saxophone (B4), cover art
- Jim Sauter – baritone saxophone, alto saxophone, tenor saxophone, electric guitar

Production and additional personnel

- Gary Solomon – engineering
- Mike Smirnoff – cover art

== Release history ==
Region	Date	Label	Format	Catalog
United States	1984	Agaric	LP	Ag 1984
United States	2013	Agaric	CD	Ag 1984
