= Zurich porcelain =

Zurich ware is a type of porcelain that was made in Zurich, Switzerland.

It was made in the Zurich Pottery and Porcelain Factory, which was founded in 1763 by decorator Salomon Gessner. The factory was based in Kilchberg-Schooren on Lake Zurich and produced a mixture of faience (tin-glazed pottery) and faience fine (lead-glazed earthenware) alongside the more traditional Zurich ware. Pieces were initially painted by hand, but after 1775, both faience and faience fine were transfer printed. The most popular floral decorations included indianische Blumen (formal) and deutsche Blumen (natural). The factory closed in the 19th century, and Zurich ware's popularity died off.

From 1775 until 1779, German/Swiss sculptor Johann Valentin Sonnenschein worked at the factory and created porcelain figures in the style of Zurich ware.
