= Battle of Zurich =

The Battle of Zurich may refer to:

- The siege of Zurich during the Old Zürich War (1443–1446)
- Either of two battles during the war between revolutionary France and the Second Coalition (1798–1800):
  - First Battle of Zurich, (June 1799)
  - Second Battle of Zurich, (September 1799)
- The Züriputsch (6 September 1839)
