= Paul Garrin =

American artist

- Born: 1957 (age 68–69)
- Education: Cooper Union A'82
- Occupations: Media Artist, Internet Social Entrepreneur
- Years active: 1981–present

Paul Garrin (born 1957) is an interdisciplinary artist and social entrepreneur whose work explores the social impact of technology and issues of media access, free speech, public/private space, and the digital divide. Starting as his assistant in 1981, Garrin eventually emerged as one of the most important collaborators of video art superstar Nam June Paik, working closely together from 1982 to 1996.

Since the 1990s, Garrin has carried his politicized style of action art-making onto the Internet, founding companies and projects that work to free the Internet from corporate and government control. His work spans between the highest technology available and hands-on street video, all for a common political cause. The New York Times art critic Grace Glueck describes Paul Garrin as a politically active video artist.

Founded in 1996, Garrin's social enterprise Name.Space is among the earliest Internet top-level domain registries offering affordable and expressive TLDs. Manifested in the Name.Space.Charter, Name.Space champions freedom of speech, and free, self-supporting commerce as an important counterbalance to government's monopoly powers. Name.Space challenged the status-quo in an antitrust lawsuit with ICANN.

== Early life and education ==
Garrin grew up in Camden, New Jersey. He took night classes at the Philadelphia College of Art, and worked at an offset printing shop in the day to support himself.

Garrin began working with video while studying fine arts at the Cooper Union for the Advancement of Science and Art in New York City (1977–82) where he enrolled after two years of classical art training in painting, drawing, sculpture, materials, and printmaking at the Pennsylvania Academy of the Fine Arts in Philadelphia (1977). At Cooper Union, Garrin studied with many well-known artists including Hans Haacke, Vito Acconci, Robert Breer and Martha Rosler, all of whom had a major impact on Garrin's aesthetics and critical social content in his works.

In 2001, Paul Garrin (A'82), was awarded the Cooper Union President Citation for outstanding attainments and contributions to his profession, and was inducted into the Cooper Union Alumni Hall of Fame.

== Video & Media Artworks ==
=== Art Videotapes ===
Garrin belongs to the second generation of video artists whose works mix technological innovation with social criticism. Along with Jenny Holzer, Julia Scher, Lowell Darling, Laurie Anderson, Garrin was among a group of autonomous artists creating works of art within the Web, tapping into the potential of the Web as a creative medium, thereby transcending the basic nature of the medium at the time.

From the time he was a student at Cooper Union, Paul's video works focused on single and double channel pieces. After graduation, Garrin's work was heavily influenced by the experimental works of Nam June Paik. This influence is seen emerging in such works as "A Place to Hide", 1985, and a series of pieces in collaboration with musician and composer Ryuichi Sakamoto and video artist Kit Fitzgerald sponsored by SONY Corporation, 1985–86, most notably "A Human Tube".

In 1988, Garrin created one of his most groundbreaking videos entitled "Free Society" featuring original music by downtown composer and musician Elliott Sharp. Featuring uniquely layered digital effects and hand-cutout images edited in a staccato pace that reflects the violence and brutality of the subject matter, "Free Society" went on to win numerous awards, was featured in video and film festivals around the world, and is in the permanent collection of the U.S. Library of Congress. It also contains footage from his 1988 video of the Tompkins Square Park Police Riot.

==== Art Videography ====
- A Place to Hide, 1985
- A Human Tube, 1985–86 with Ryuichi Sakamoto
- Free Society, 1988
- Man with a Video Camera (Fuck Vertov), 1989
- Reverse Big Brother & Home(Less) is Where the Revolution is, 1990
- By Any Means Necessary, 1990

=== Fashion Video ===
Between the years 1984 to 1997, Garrin was among the pioneers in the field of fashion videography. He worked with a number of popular fashion designers of the day. Highly attuned to the arts, they hired Garrin because of his background in fine arts, his experimental video works and collaborations with video artist Nam June Paik. Most notably were the designers Willi Smith, Carmelo Pomodoro and David Cameron. Some of his fashion videos are in the collection of the Fashion Institute of Technology.

=== Interactive Installations ===
Since 1989, Garrin has been working with interactive media, and developed three highly acclaimed works, "Yuppie Ghetto with Watchdog", 1989–90, "White Devil", 1992-93 and "Border Patrol" 1995–97, all of which were produced with the technical collaboration of friend and artist David Rokeby, creator of the "Very Nervous System", evolutions of which formed the basis of "Yuppie Ghetto", "White Devil", and "Border Patrol". Garrin also enlisted Don Ritter, another friend and artist working in the same realm to create the live targets in the Border Patrol installation.

- Border Patrol, 1995-1997
- White Devil, 1992-1993
- Yuppie Ghetto with Watchdog, 1989-1990

== Exhibitions, Reviews, Publications ==
Garrin's works have been widely exhibited and broadcast internationally including the Biennale d'art contemporain de Lyon, 1995–96, Kwangju Biennale, 1995, São Paulo Art Biennial, 1994, Holly Solomon Gallery in New York, Musee d'art contemporain de Montreal, 1997, Galleri Faurschou, Copenhagen, 1997, Offenes Kulturhaus, Linz, 1998, Lehmbruck Museum, Duisburg, Germany, 1999, and has been reviewed in The New York Times, Art in America, Artforum, and others.

Garrin's works have been documented in numerous publications worldwide including "History of 20th Century Art" by Taschen.

His major works "Yuppie Ghetto with Watchdog", "White Devil" and "Border Patrol" are in the permanent collection of the Center for Art and Media Karlsruhe, Germany.

=== List of Exhibitions ===
The following is a list of exhibitions that showcased Garrin's art videos and interactive installations:

1985

- The Kitchen, New York
- Musee d'Art Moderne de la Ville de Paris, Paris
- New Video Music, EUA

1987

- Artists in the Electronic Age, Davis Hall, City College of New York, New York
- Medienwerkstatt, Vienna
- Westfalisches Landesmusuem für Kunst und Kulturegeschichte, Munster, Germany
- Kunsthaus, Zurique
- American Video Festival
- American Film Institute, Los Angeles
- Folkwang 3 Video, Museum Folkwang, Essen, Germany
- Bonn Videonale, Bonn, Alemaha
- US Videovisit, Video Offensive, Dortmund, Germany

1988

- Hayward Gallery (with Nam June Paik), South Bank Centre, London
- The American Festival, American Film Institute, Los Angeles
- Bonn Videonale, Bonn, Germany
- Dallas Video Festival, Dallas Museum of Art, Dallas
- La Diade, Centro di Studi i Diffusione d'Arte Contemporanea, Bergamo, Italy

1989

- Festival de Cinema de Berlin
- Strange Attractors: Signs of Chaos, New Museum of Contemporary Art, New York

1990

- Featured Artist, Festival de Cinema de Berlin, Germany
- "Yuppie Ghetto with Watchdog" Premiere, The Clocktower Gallery, New York
- Amerika Haus, Berlin, Germany
- Videofest, Kunstler, Berlin, Germany
- Image World: Art and Media Culture, Whitney Museum, New York

1992

- Videoforms, Clermont-Ferrand, France
- Monstra de Arte
- Galeria Otso, Helsinki, Finland

1993

- Eisfabrik, Hanover, Germany
- Mediale, Hamburg, Germany

1994

- Holly Solomon Gallery, New York
- 22a Bienal Internacional de São Paulo, Brazil

1995

- Gwanju Biennale, Gwangju, South Korea
- Installation, cinema, video, informatique, 3e Biennale d'art contemporain de Lyon, France

1995–96

- Installation, cinema, video, informatique, 3e Biennale d'art contemporain de Lyon, France

1997

- Border Patrol, Galleri Faurschou, Copenhagen, Denmark
- Musee d'art contemprian de Montreal, Canada
- The Video Living Room

1998

- Offenes Kulturhaus, Linz, Austria

1999

- Lehmbruck Museum, Duisbrg, Germany

== Honors and awards ==
Garrin was the Artist in Residence at the Berlin Videofest, 1990, and has received numerous awards for excellence including New York Foundation for the Arts Fellowship, 1988; Special Prize, Bonn Videonale, 1988; New York State Council on the Arts Media Grant, 1990; Prize, Video Shorts, Seattle, 1990 & 91; Prix Ars Electronica, 1997; ZKM | Karlsruhe Medienkunstpreis, 1992. In 2001, Garrin was awarded the Cooper Union President's Citation for outstanding attainments and contributions to his profession.

=== List of Honors, Awards & Grants ===
The following is a list of awards Garrin received for his artworks and accomplishments:

1988

- Special Prize, Bonn Videonale, Bonn, Germany
- New York Foundation Arts Fellowship

1990

- New York State Council on the Arts Media Grant
- Prize, Video Shorts, Seattle, U.S.
- Artist in Residence, Berlin Videofest

1991

- Prize, Video Shorts, Seattle, U.S.

1992

- Siemens Media Art Prize 1992, Medienkunstpreis, Karlsruhe, Germany

1993

- Mediale, Hamburg, Germany

1997

- Award of Distinction in Interactive Art, Prix Ars Electronica

2001

- President's Citation, The Alumni Hall of Fame, Cooper Union, New York

== Paul Garrin and Nam June Paik ==
Starting as his assistant in 1981, Garrin eventually emerged as one of Nam June Paik's most important and longtime collaborators, working closely with him from 1982 to 1996. Garrin started working for Paik on March 30, 1981, the day that Ronald Reagan was shot, and spent the day recording TV news broadcasts of the event. Evident in Paik's later pieces, Garrin produced hundreds of works with his richly layered and textured tour-de-force imaging techniques, where images multiply and divide within the frame; temporal and spatial shifts proliferate, visuals and sound are juxtaposed in ironic contexts.

These were exhibited and remain in the collections of major museums worldwide including the Museum of Modern Art (MoMa), Solomon R. Guggenheim Museum, Los Angeles County Museum of Art, Smithsonian American Art Museum, Centre Georges Pompidou, Museum Ludwig, and elsewhere.

One such collaboration was Garrin and Paik's Two Channel Music Tape Spring/Fall (1986) comprising two different but complementary videos playing simultaneously on monitors. The visual interplay creates a rapid visual assault. Scenes are multi-layered, fleeting and hard to register. Aesthetically pleasing and amusing footage of the news, pop-culture, and art world are altered and synthesized with the pair's signature image-processing techniques. This piece was acquired by the Long Beach Museum of Art (LBMA) by museum curator Michael Nash in 1989.

=== List of Exhibitions ===
The following is a list of exhibitions that showcased Paul Garrin and Nam June Paik's media art collaborations:

1988

- Hayward Gallery (with Nam June Paik), South Bank Centre, London

1989

- Reconstructed Realms: Recent Acquisitions of LBMA's Video Collection
- Living with the Living Theatre, Smithsonian American Art Museum

1990

- Waterworks

1991

- Art of Music Video: 10 Years After

== Social Impact ==
=== Tompkins Square Park Riot ===
As an early citizen journalist, Garrin's noted video document of the Tompkins Square Park Riot (1988) became iconic in exposing the coverup of police misconduct. Shot with a home video camcorder, the tape exposed through the media the willful police violence against demonstrators and bystanders, and became known as the spark which ignited the "camcorder revolution".

Garrin, who was taking video pictures from atop a van was clubbed by two police officers (with other officers looking on) as he pleaded that he was climbing off the vehicle at their instruction and urged not to be hit. With his potentially incriminating video shown on many television stations, Garrin was one of the most prominent of the Tompkins Square victims. On the day after the riot, he received two anonymous threatening phone calls, and the day after that another two. He recalls the language in some of them: "You better get the fuck away -- they're gonna get you." "Paul, you stupid motherfucker, you got the whole Police Department against you." "You can run, but you can't hide."

Pummeled by at least five officersand video-documented by Clayton Patterson, a class action lawsuit was filed on behalf of Garrin. In addition to seeking damages for Garrin, the suit sought to end a longstanding pattern of police abuse, namely, interference with persons photographing and otherwise recording police actions.

=== Popular culture ===
The media notoriety of the riot video with Garrin as videographer is believed to have inspired the late playwright and then East Village, Manhattan resident Jonathan Larson to create the character "Mark Cohen" in Rent (musical).

=== Community engagement ===
Officially serving on the Cooper Union Alumni Association (CUAA) Communications Committee, Garrin has been an active member of the CUAA since 2011.

From the fall of 2011, Garrin participated in the Friends of Cooper Union and Free Cooper Union brainstorming events, and contributed to "The Way Forward" – a document of proposals to help restructure the Cooper Union to aid it out of the Cooper Union financial crisis and tuition protests, and restore full tuition scholarships to all of its students.

In 2013, Garrin co-organized a CUAA/CUES event in the Great Hall in conjunction with the MIT Enterprise Forum of NY on surveillance. Entitled "Ethics, Law & Surveillance Culture" the program featured author James Bamford, criminal defense attorney Stanley L. Cohen, New York Civil Liberties Union Director Donna Lieberman, and independent journalist Paul DeRienzo.

By January 2014, Garrin successfully crowd-funded the Cooper Lumen Design Challenge, partnering with non-profit Two Bridges Neighborhood Council to directly fund interdisciplinary student work for credit in the 2014 semester, all of which has generated positive media for Cooper Union.

==== Summary ====
- Represented Cooper Union as panel member at Ruckus NYC–a one-day conference and concert on art and the web, 29 September 2012.
- Participated in the Law Affinity Group Pop-up on 6 December 2012.
- Co-organized and hosted "Ethics, Law & Surveillance Culture" on 23 September 2013.
- Successfully crowdfunded over 10K for the Cooper Lumen Design Challenge on 15 January 2014.
- Represented CUAA as docent at the Ken Burns Charity Event on 26 March 2014.
- Co-organizer of the Peter Cooper Block Party on Founders Day, 13 April 2014.

== From Media Artist to Internet Social Entrepreneur ==
In 1992, Garrin was a UNESCO Fellow at the Academy of Media Arts Cologne, Germany, where he was first introduced to the Internet.

=== Name.Space ===
Formerly PG Media, Garrin founded Name.Space in 1996, an independent top-level domain (TLD) registry with a primary mission to develop, publish and provide registry services for new TLDs on the Internet, to introduce competition, diversity and localism in the domain name market, and support the balanced interests of commercial, non-commercial, and political speech on the internet.

Through online crowd-sourcing, Name.Space was the first to create hundreds of new Internet TLDs including .NYC, .ART, .MUSIC,.SPACE, .SUCKS and .GREEN, pioneering the expansion of the Internet Domain Name System while others opposed it. Some even spread untruths that the addition of hundreds or more TLDs would "break the Internet". In reality, there are no technical constraints preventing the addition of thousands of new top-level names to the DNS root.

Name.Space's creation of hundreds of TLDs predates the formation of the Internet Corporation for Assigned Names and Numbers (ICANN) which incorporated in 1998 As an early proponent of a shared TLD registry system, Name.Space helped shape the adaptation of a wholesale-retail domain registration market that is in practice today.

Name.Space endeavored to bring its TLDs to market by means of an antitrust case against Network Solutions 1997–2000 (based on the successful MCI v. ATT that broke up the telephone company monopoly in the US in 1983). The Name.Space v. Network Solutions, Inc. antitrust lawsuit gave momentum to the restructuring of the domain name registration market from a single monopoly based system to a wholesale-retail one.

Although Network Solutions got immunity from the antitrust law, the public benefited from the Name.Space v. NSI lawsuit with the introduction of the wholesale-retail structure that transformed the domain registration market lowering fees from $100 to less than $10 to register a domain name, depending on the TLD and the retailer.

ICANN held its first generic top-level domain (gTLD) application process in 2000. Name.Space was considered in the top 10 "strong candidates" out of 44 applicants, but delegation was deferred in favor of a very limited group of domain industry incumbents, almost all closely tied to ICANN, to the exclusion of many viable new entrants. A number of ICANN Board members recused themselves from the gTLD selection process because of involvement with applications under consideration. Particularly controversial was a proposal by Afilias LLC, an organization that includes 19 registrars, including Herndon, Va.-based Network Solutions Inc., the domain registration unit of VeriSign Inc., to run the registry for a .web domain.

Nevertheless, former ICANN Chair Esther Dyson supported Name.Space's application. In her syndicated column in SFGate, an online version of the San Francisco Chronicle, she wrote:

"... the proposal of Name.Space appealed to me precisely because it was a mix of commerce and principle. If the company that wanted to offer .star and .jazz was prepared to subsidize .sucks, more power to it.

Name.Space exists today as a social enterprise corporation and continues to challenge status-quo entities that it views as corrupt with a lawsuit against ICANN.

=== WiFi-NY ===
In 2003, Garrin launched WiFi-NY, an independent, cooperative community wireless broadband network that serves downtown Manhattan and Brooklyn. Since 2013, the WiFi-NY Peoples Emergency Network has been in partnership with Two Bridges Neighborhood Council, LES community groups, Cooper Union Alumnus, Toby J. Cumberbatch, Professor of Engineering, Cooper Union and students from the Cooper Union schools of Art, Architecture, and Engineering to design a solar-powered product that can simultaneously provide public wireless Internet, emergency lighting and a charging station for computers or cell phones to enhance community resiliency post Hurricane Sandy. Community leaders supporting the Cooper Lumen Design Challenge hope to install the resulting three-in-one power innovation(s) around public spaces — starting near the East River waterfront, and in common areas in Two Bridges, Lower East Side, Chinatown, Manhattan East Village and other New York City neighborhoods, where many suffered after losing power after Superstorm Sandy struck.
