= Dakota Style =

American snack food company

- Company type: Private
- Industry: Snack food
- Founded: 1985; 41 years ago
- Founders: Bob and Betty Campbell
- Headquarters: Clark, South Dakota
- Area served: United States
- Products: Potato chips, sunflower seeds, popcorn
- Owner: Kevin Dandurand
- Number of employees: 22 (2,000)
- Website: dakotastyle.com

Dakota Style is a snack food company (Dakota Style Chips, Inc.) and brand of snack foods produced by that company. It operates out of Clark, South Dakota. The brand's flagship product remains the original Industrial Strength kettle cooked potato chips, though Dakota Style now produces other snack foods as well, including jumbo sunflower seeds, sunflower kernels, and flavored popcorn.

Bob and Betty Campbell started Dakota Style on their family farm in 1985, as a way to add value to their potato crop by processing it into potato chips. The "Industrial Strength" kettle cooked chips were the product of Betty Campbell's kitchen experiments, based on textures and tastes that were variants of Hawaiian "Maui Chips." The Campbells and their sons grew Dakota Style into a successful business before selling it in 1998.

In 2006, Dakota Style focused on expanding distribution of sunflower seeds, and by 2012, seeds accounted for 70 percent of distribution.

Dakota Style is a sponsor of Jared Allen's Pro Bull Team.

On 21 February 2016, the Dakota Style potato chip production facility was destroyed by fire.

In May 2016, Dakota Style recalled 6,930 cases of sunflower seeds packaged between February and April 2016, sourced from SunOpta, due to potential contamination with Listeria monocytogenes. Later that month, the recall was extended to include 15,158 cases, packaged from February through May 2016.
