= Tompkins Square Park =

Public park in Manhattan, New York

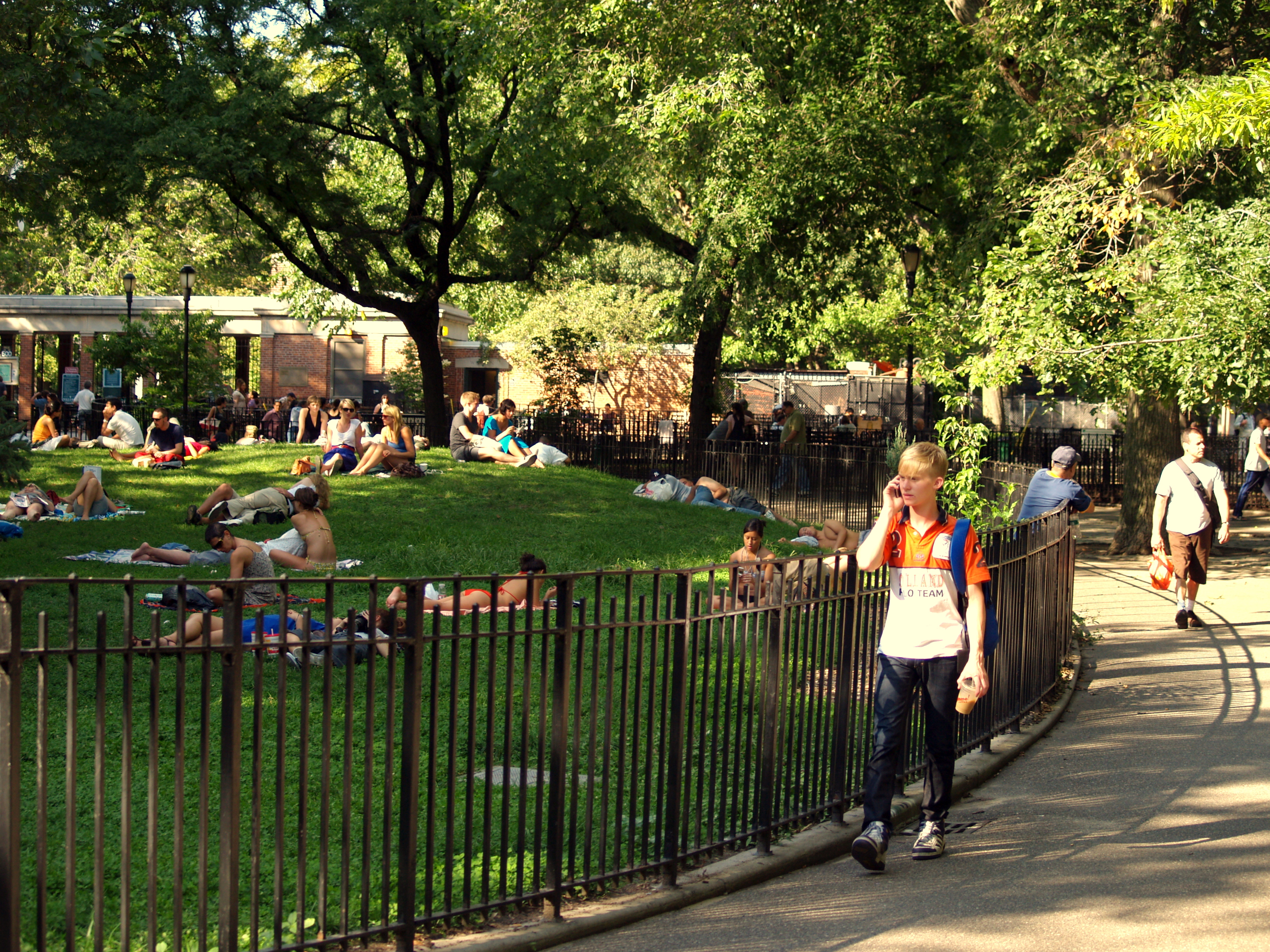
- The main lawn of the park
- Interactive map of Tompkins Square Park
- Type: public
- Location: Alphabet City/East Village, Manhattan, New York City
- Coordinates: 40°43′35″N 73°58′54″W
- Area: 10.5 acres (4.2 ha)
- Created: 1834
- Operator: New York City Department of Parks and Recreation
- Open: 6 a.m. to 1 a.m.
- Status: Open all year
- Public transit: Subway: to First Avenue station

Tompkins Square Park is a 10.5-acre (4.2 ha) public park in the Alphabet City portion of East Village, Manhattan, New York City. The square-shaped park, bounded on the north by East 10th Street, on the east by Avenue B, on the south by East 7th Street, and on the west by Avenue A, is abutted by St. Marks Place to the west. The park opened in 1834 and is named for Daniel D. Tompkins, Vice President of the United States.

== History ==
=== 19th century ===
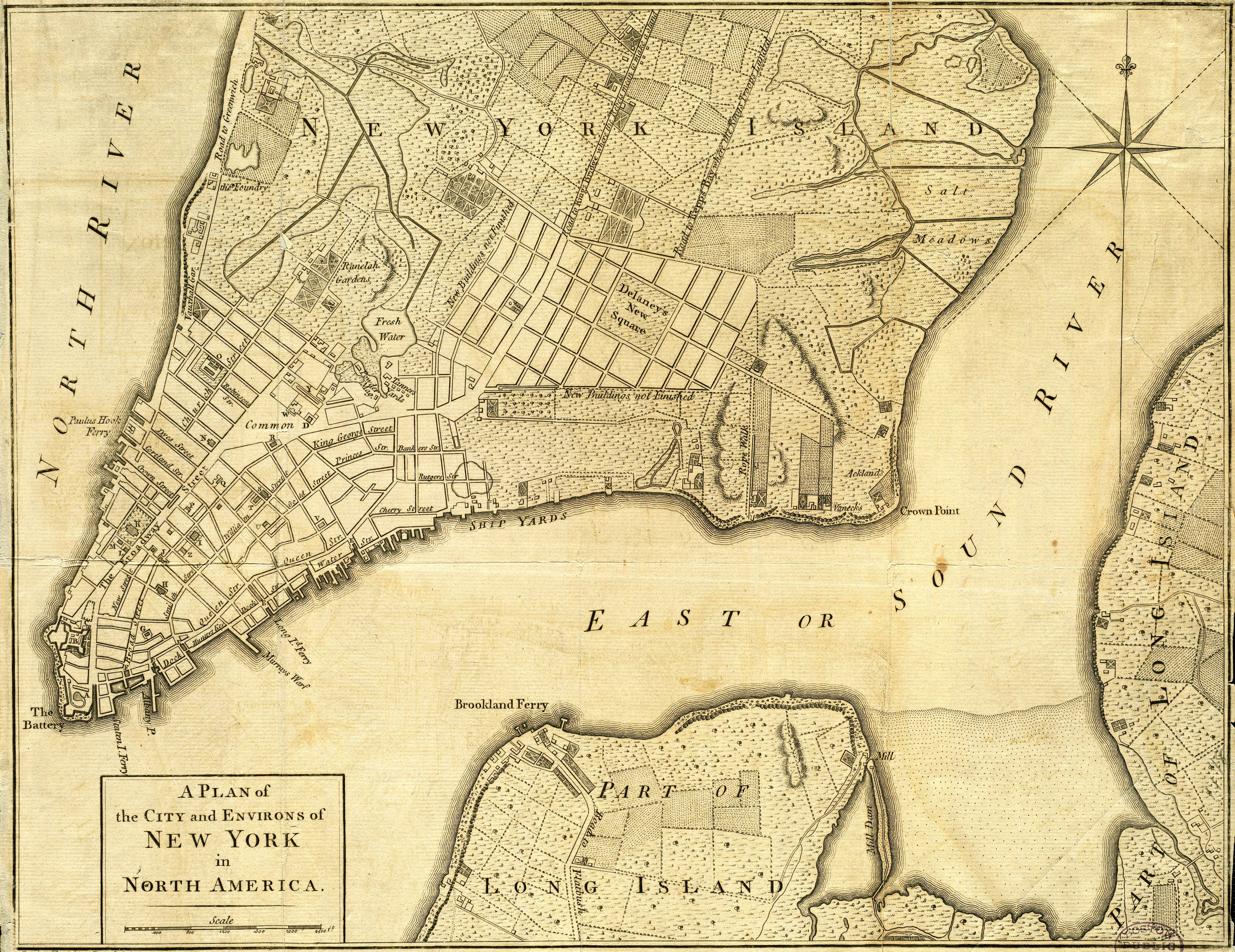
"Salt Meadows" in a British map of 1776

Tompkins Square Park is located on land near the East River, that originally consisted of salt marsh and open tidal meadows, "Stuyvesant meadows", the largest such ecosystem on Manhattan island, but has since been filled in. The unimproved site, lightly taxed by the city as most agricultural properties were, seemed scarcely worth the expense of improving to its owners, the Stuyvesants, who inherited it from the 17th-century grant awarded to Peter Stuyvesant, and their Pell and Fish relatives. The City aldermen, to raise the tax base of the city, accepted a gift of land in 1829 from Peter Gerard Stuyvesant (1778–1847) with the understanding that it would remain a public space, and compensated other owners with $62,000 in city funds to set aside a residential square; transforming the muddy site took another $22,000 before Tompkins Square was opened in 1834. Surrounded by a cast-iron fence the following year and planted with trees, the square was expected to have a prosperous and genteel future, which was undercut, however, by the Panic of 1837 that brought the city's expansion to a halt.

Tompkins Square Park is named for Daniel D. Tompkins (1774–1825), Vice President of the United States under President James Monroe and the Governor of New York from 1807 until 1817. He had overseen some early drainage in the locality in connection with minor fortifications in the War of 1812. The park was opened in 1850.

In 1857, immigrants protesting unemployment and food shortages were attacked by police. In 1863 the deadly Draft Riots occurred in the park.

On January 13, 1874, the Tompkins Square Riot occurred in the park when police crushed a demonstration involving thousands of workers. The riot marked an unprecedented era of labor conflict and violence. The riot occurred in the midst of the Panic of 1873, a depression that began in 1873 and lasted for several years. Workers movements throughout the United States had been making demands of the government to help ease the strain of the depression. Organizations rejected offers of charity and instead had asked for public works programs that would provide jobs for the masses of unemployed.

In 1877, 5,000 people fought with the National Guard when a crowd gathered at the park to hear Communist revolutionary speeches.

On April 7, 1897, a rabbi was arrested for not obtaining a permit for the performance of Birkat Hachama, a Jewish ritual done once every 28 years.

=== 20th century ===
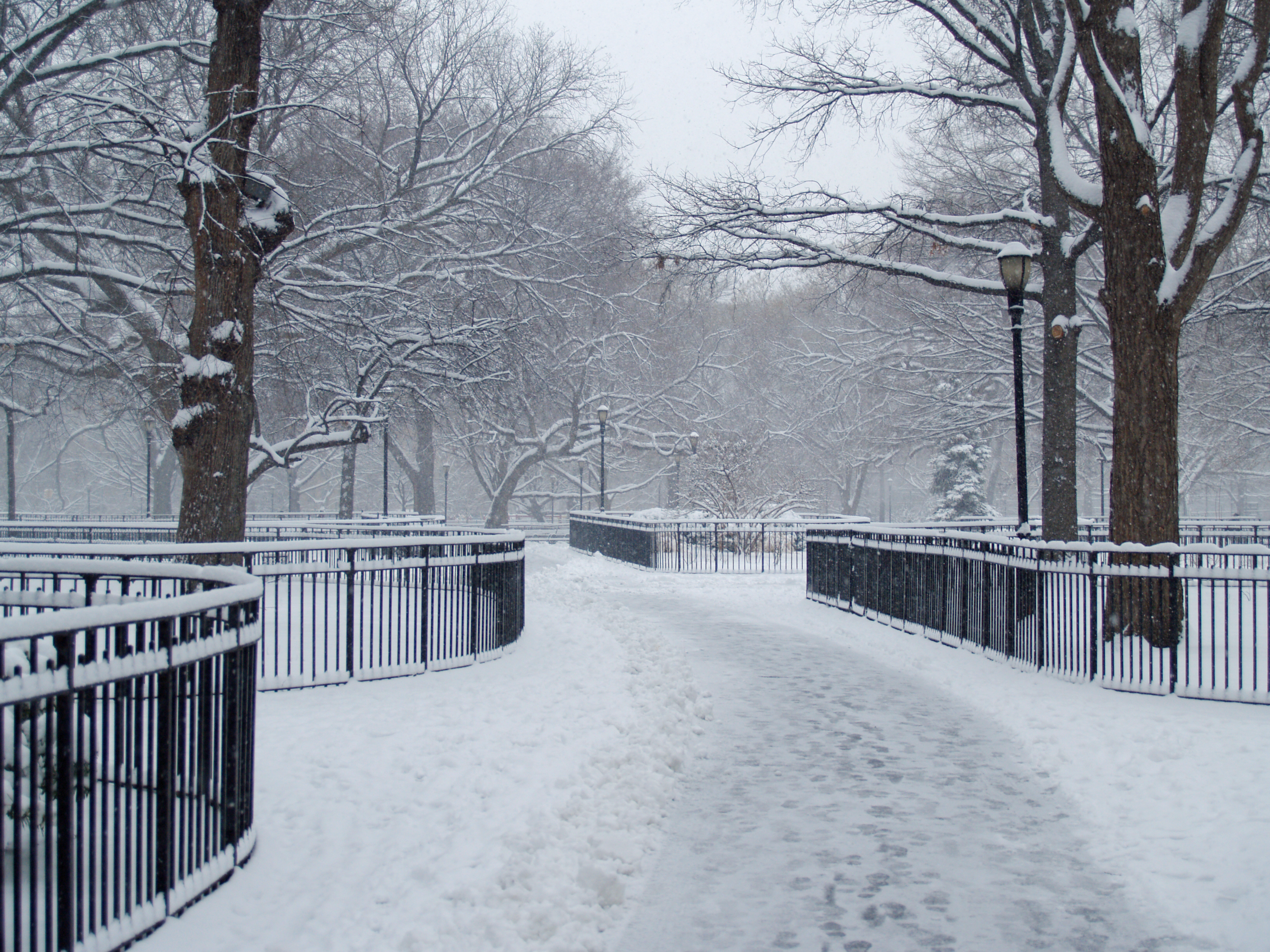
Snow in February 2008

In the middle 19th century the "Square" included a large parade ground for drilling the New York National Guard. The modern layout of the park by Robert Moses in 1936 is said to be intended to divide and manage crowds that have gathered there in protest since the 1870s. That tradition was rekindled as the park became the nursery of demonstrations against the Vietnam War in the 1960s.

By the 1980s, the park had become for many New Yorkers synonymous with the city's increased social problems. The park at that time was a high-crime area that contained encampments of homeless people, and it was a center for illegal drug dealing and heroin use.

In August 1988, a riot erupted in the park when police attempted to clear the park of homeless people; 38 people were injured. Bystanders as well as homeless people and political activists got caught up in the police action that took place on the night of August 6 and the early morning of August 7, after a large number of police surrounded the park and charged at the hemmed-in crowd while other police ordered all pedestrians not to walk on streets neighboring the park. Much of the violence was videotaped and clips were shown on local TV news reports (notably including one by a man who sat on his stoop across the street from the park and continued to film while a police officer beat him up), but ultimately, although at least one case went to trial, no police officers were found culpable. A punk rock festival has been held in the park in the years since, in commemoration of the event.

The park had become a symbol of the problems in the city, including homelessness—which had prompted the 1988 riot. Against that backdrop, Daniel Rakowitz shocked the neighborhood in 1989 when he murdered Monika Beerle, dismembered her, made a soup out of her body and served it to the homeless in the park. Rakowitz, called the Butcher of Tompkins Square, was found not guilty by reason of insanity and remains incarcerated at the Kirby Forensic Psychiatric Center on Wards Island.

Further clashes occurred during May Day festivities of 1990, the culmination of a "Resist 2 Exist" Festival, which featured notable local acts and artists. Twenty-nine protesters were arrested and 25 charged with felony charges.

From June 3, 1991, to July 25, 1992, the park was closed to the public for restoration, but also to keep out the homeless and in attempt to calm tensions. The Tompkins Square Park Bandshell, a key feature of the park, was one of the first targets of these renovations.

=== 21st century ===
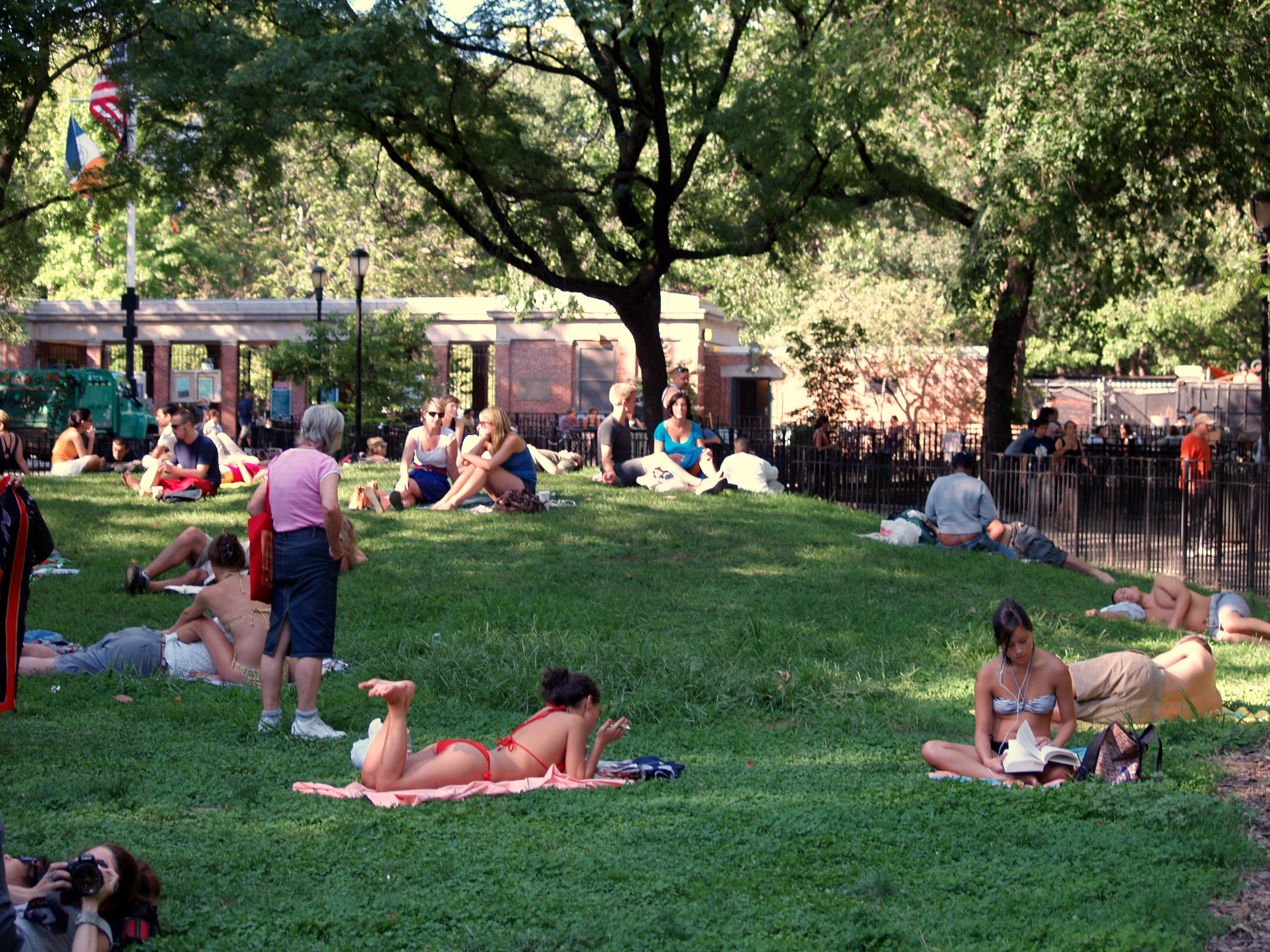
People relaxing and sunbathing on the park's central knoll

Increasing gentrification in the East Village during the 1990s and 2000s, and enforcement of a park curfew and the eviction of homeless people have changed the character of Tompkins Square Park. As noted above, the park was closed and refurbished in 1991 and reopened in 1992. Today, with its playgrounds and basketball courts, dog run, ping pong table, handball courts, and built-in outdoor chess tables, the park attracts young families, students and seniors and tourists from all over the globe. Since the 1980s, the asphalt that covers the multi-purpose courts at Tompkins Square Park has served as a skatepark and training grounds for multiple generations of skateboarders.

In 2024, the New York state government provided $6 million to replace Tompkins Square Park's elevated swimming pool with an enlarged swimming pool at ground level. The same year, NYC Parks temporarily installed an electronic basketball hoop, with a video screen, at the park. A renovated bathroom opened at the park in 2025. Work on the ground-level swimming pool had still not started by 2026. By that October, the local community board's parks committee had approved plans to renovate the fitness area, basketball courts, and swimming pool for about $10 million. The plans triggered some opposition from frequent users of the fitness equipment.

== Events ==
The outdoor drag festival Wigstock, held in the park, later became part of the Howl Festival, which ran annually until 2013. The Charlie Parker Jazz Festival is a musical tribute to the famous former resident of Avenue B. In 2007, the New Village Music Festival was formed. This is a community music festival dedicated to celebrating New York's diverse music scene. In addition, the event highlights the importance of music and cultural arts programs throughout the city.

There is also an annual event in early August commemorating the 1988 Police Riot that features neighborhood bands.

The Food Not Bombs Manhattan chapter serves every Sunday in the park, rain or shine.

Cultural Services of the French Embassy in the United States and the New York City Department of Parks and Recreation have a popular free outdoor French film festival which shows a critically acclaimed French films each Friday at sunset in city parks including Tompkins during June and July.

== Fauna and flora ==
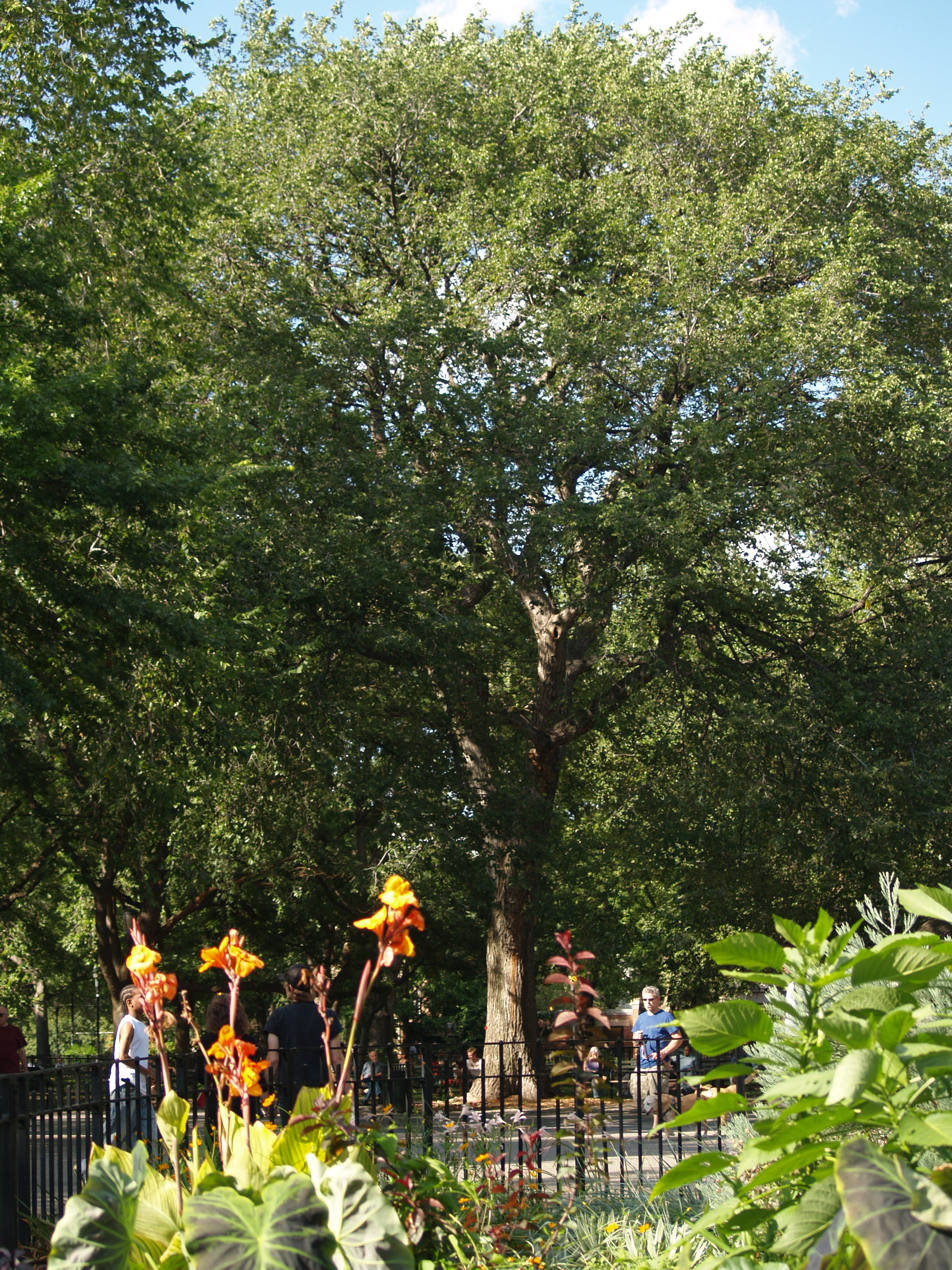
The Hare Krishna Tree 40°43′33.9″N 73°58′54.8″W

The park contains a number of elm trees. One of these, known as the Hare Krishna Tree, for its association with the 1966 founding of the Krishna movement in the United States.

== Recreational facilities ==
=== Playgrounds ===
The main playground, closest to Avenue A, features jungle gyms, rock climbing features, and a water fountain flush with the ground. There is a large sandbox, swing sets, and benches. There are two smaller playgrounds in the section of the park near 7th Street and Avenue B. The main playground reopened in August 2009 after a year-long renovation.

=== Multi-purpose courts ===
==== Skateboarding training facility ====
Since the 1980s, the asphalt that covers the multi-purpose courts at Tompkins Square Park has served as a skatepark and training grounds for generations of skateboarders. In 1989, Shut Skateboards hosted a contest at the park featuring ramps and other skate obstacles. The multi-purpose courts' asphalt is known as T.F., as well as; Thompson's, a misnomer. T.F. stands for “training facility”. Many acclaimed skateboarders, including Tyshawn Jones, Alex Olson, Yaje Popson, Jarrod Brandreth, Harold Hunter, Ted Barrow, Andy Kessler, Zered Bassett, Jake Johnson, and others, have skated Tompkins Square Park, using it as a training facility.

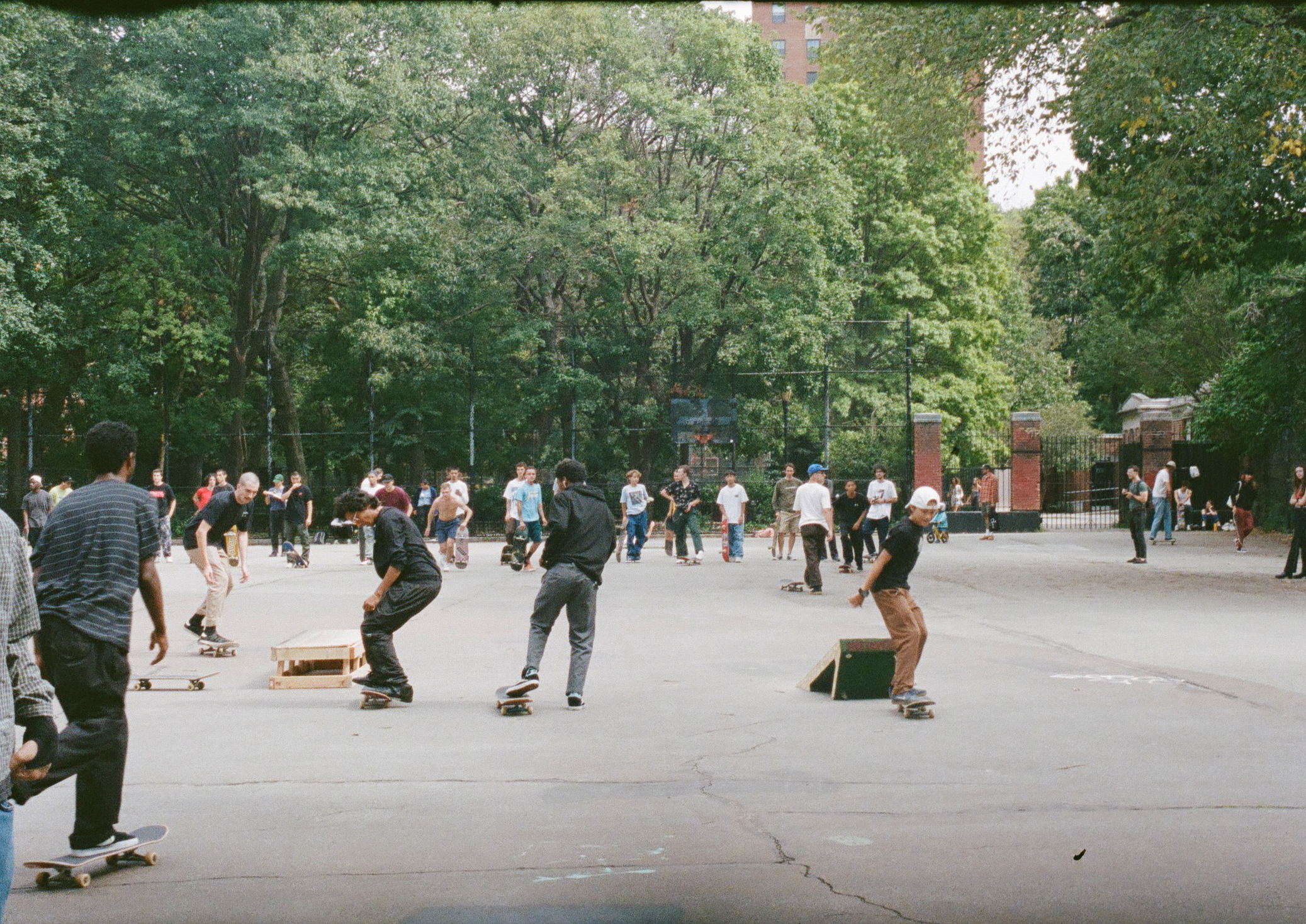
Skateboarders skate at Tompkins Square Park during the September 7th, 2019 'Save Tompkins' rally

=== Turfing controversy ===
In 2019, the Parks Department announced plans to cover over the asphalt lot in the park's northwest corner with synthetic turf by 2020. Skateboarders have protested this plan, with TF local Adam Zhu starting an online petition that garnered over 30,000 signatures. Zhu and others in the TF community planned a rally to support saving the historic skating grounds. Zhu worked with Steve Rodriguez, Carlina Rivera, Mitchell Silver, Supreme, and others to bring awareness to the turfing controversy. On Friday September 6, 2019, one day before the rally was set to take place, the Parks Department announced that they intend to keep the asphalt, scrapping plans to put down synthetic turf. As a result of the skateboarding community organizing, the asphalt in the multi-purpose courts will not be disturbed.

=== Tompkins Square Dog Run ===
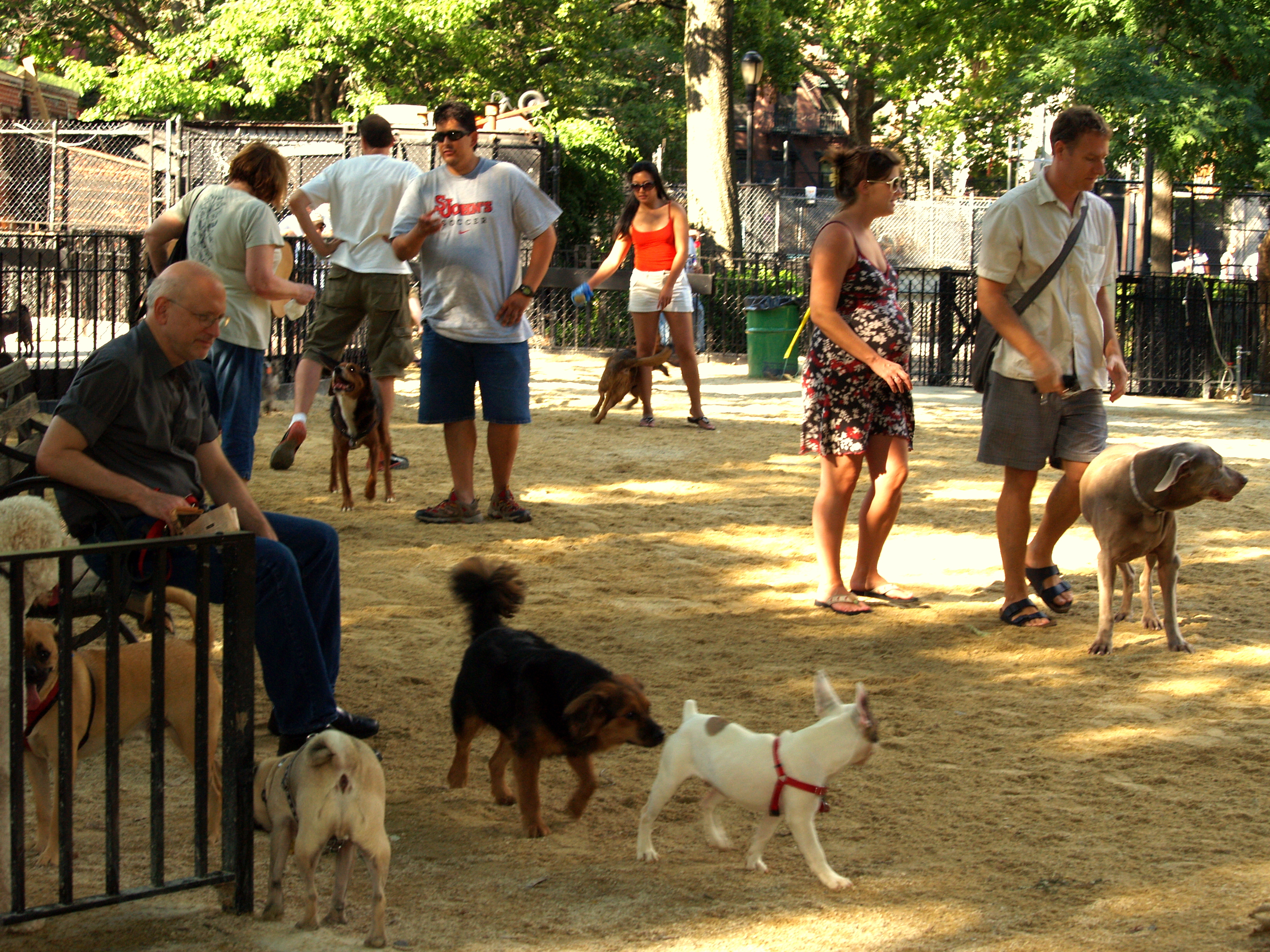
The renovated Big Dog Run

The Tompkins Square Dog Run was the first dog run in New York City. It opened in 1990 as part of a large-scale renovation of the dilapidated park. It recently underwent a $450,000 renovation, much of which was funded by the New York City government and fund-raising by dog run patrons. It now includes a surface of crushed stone [sand], three swimming pools, a tree deck, and bath areas and hoses to spray off one's pet.

The run hosts the annual Tompkins Square Halloween Dog Parade to raise money for its own maintenance. The event claims to be the biggest dog Halloween party in the United States, boasting an annual attendance of more than 400 dogs in costume and 2,000 spectators. In 2026, the parade returned for its 36th year.

== Monuments ==
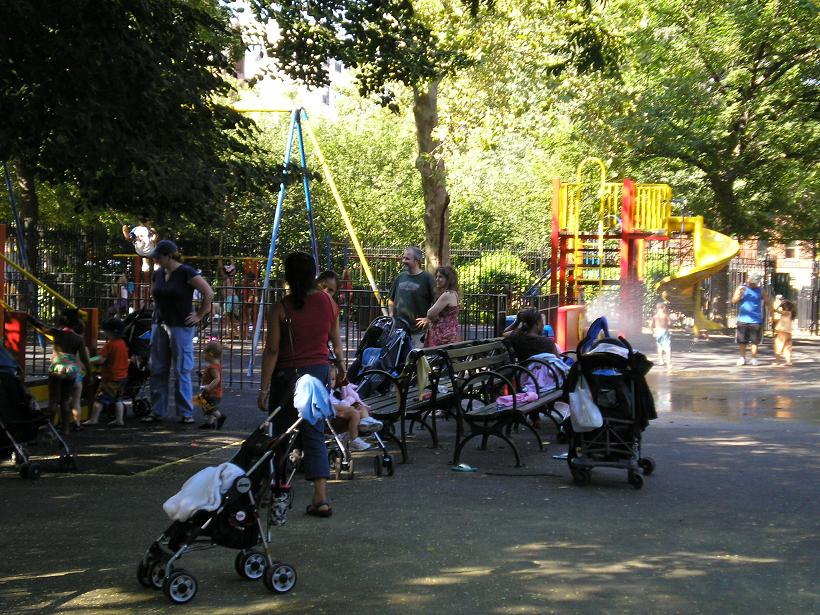
One of the park playgrounds in 2006

The park contains three monuments. There is a monument in the north side of the park to the General Slocum boating disaster on June 15, 1904. This was the greatest single loss of life in New York City prior to the September 11, 2001 attacks. Over a thousand people, mainly German immigrant mothers and children, drowned in the East River that day. The area near the park, formerly known as Kleindeutschland, effectively dissolved in grief as shattered German families moved away. This disaster is also memorialized in James Joyce's novel Ulysses.

Indian Sadhu A.C. Bhaktivedanta Swami Prabhupada came to sing and preach at the park in 1966, beginning the worldwide Hare Krishna movement. An elm tree in the park's southern plaza that he chanted beneath is now considered sacred to the Hare Krishna faith, as noted by a New York City Department of Parks and Recreation plaque.

The southwest corner of the park contains a statue of Samuel S. Cox (1824–1889), a New York City politician who served in the U.S. House of Representatives from Ohio and New York, and as U.S. Minister to the Ottoman Empire in 1885–1886.

The Temperance Fountain located near Avenue A, South of 9th Street Transverse, was erected in 1888, during the temperance movement, to give people free access to clean drinking water so they would not have to drink alcohol for refreshment. This neo-classical fountain was a gift of the wealthy San Francisco dentist, businessman, and temperance crusader Henry D. Cogswell (1820–1900). The fountain is a square granite kiosk with four stone columns supporting a canopy on whose sides the words "Faith," "Hope," "Charity," and "Temperance" are chiseled. Atop this canopy is the Greek goddess, Hebe, cupbearer to the gods and goddesses on Mount Olympus.

== Transportation ==
The First Avenue station is located around four blocks (0.4 miles) away from Tompkins Square Park.

== See also ==
- Tompkins Square Park (song)
