= Peter Missing =

American artist (born 1953)

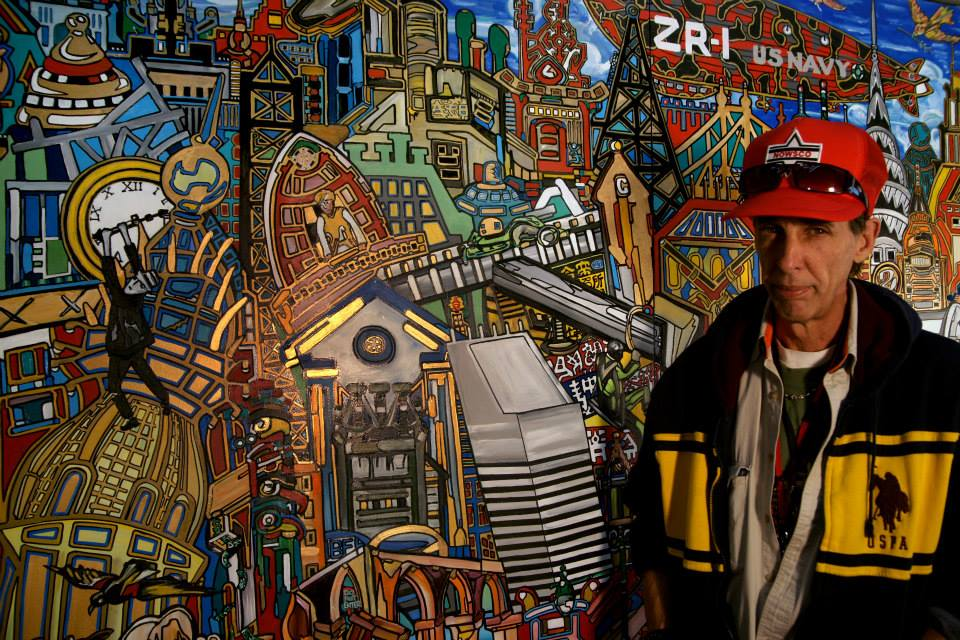
- Missing with Global Warning

Background information
- Born: Peter Colangelo; November 26, 1953 (age 72); Bronx, New York, U.S.
- Origin: Bronx, New York, U.S.
- Genres: Electronic; Industrial Noise; Experimental Vocal Sampling; Crossover
- Years active: 1979 - present
- Label: Humanity Records
- Website: www.petermissing.de

Peter Missing (born Peter Colangelo; November 26, 1953) is a New York City artist, poet, musician, and activist who relocated to Berlin in 1993. As of 2025, Missing is residing in Pittsburgh, PA.

== History ==
Missing grew up in the Bronx during the 1950s and 1960s, as a middle child of three siblings. He's Italian and one-third Danish. His father was a postal worker who delivered to the Empire State Building.

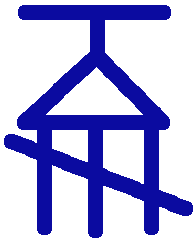
Party's over logo

He was one of the organizers of the protest against the Tompkins Square Park curfew that led to the Tompkins Square Park Riot. His symbol, an upside down martini glass with three strikes crossed out, means "party's over". The symbol used to be spotted all over the Lower East Side. It was often accompanied by anti-gentrification, anti-police brutality, anti-corporations, and pro-environment slogans. The symbol was originally designed for a band Missing founded in 1980 called Drunk Driving and has grown to symbolize the decline of our planet and a warning to start something new; time for a change.

He founded the influential underground industrial band Missing Foundation while living in Hamburg, Germany in 1984 and imported it to the U.S. in 1985 with new members. The band has included about 20 members over its history. The name came from the East German police unit whose job it was to track down people who fled to West Germany. At shows Missing would sometimes set himself on fire as part of the performance. The band released five albums with Restless Records in L.A. including Your House Is Mine which was named Rock Album of the Week in The New York Times in 1988.

Missing has been painting for the past 30 years and has works in over 30 museums in the U.S. and Europe including The Museum of Modern Art, The Whitney Museum of American Art, The Getty Institute, and the Stadt Museum in Berlin. Until October 2011, Missing had his gallery, Conto Gallery, in Kunsthaus Tacheles in Berlin. In 2012, Missing opened a new art space called Transmission Gallery in Copenhagen, Denmark.

Missing worked many years as a film set designer in Hamburg and taught art to troubled youth in different German schools.

Missing now resides in Denver, Colorado, where his gallery, Gallery Late Realism, is open by appointment.

Besides the gallery and creative work, including music performances, Missing runs creative artwork classes to the local kids in the area at a nearby youth center / artwork / music : Peter Missing Instagram and Facebook 2021 / In 2018 The full collection of Missing Foundation albums was released on bandcamp.com / new release Hard Surface / MissingFoundation 2 bandcamp.com 2021

== Discography ==
=== Solo ===
- Electronic Collection 1993-2010 (2010)

=== With Drunk Driving ===
- Drunk Driving (1983)

=== With Missing Foundation ===
- Frontline 2185 (with KMFDM, 1984)
- The 20th Anniversary of the Summer of Love 1987-1967 (with various, 1987)
- Missing Foundation (1987)
- Your House Is Mine 1933 (1988)
- Humanity Demise (1989)
- Song and Legend (with various, 1989)
- Ignore the White Culture (1990)
- Go into Exile (1992)
- Assault on Your Life (1992)
- Live in Europe 1992 (1992)
- Just Another Hit (1993)
- State of the Union 2.001 (with various, 2001)
- Live in La Plaza (2016)
- Nature is Watching You (2018)
- World in Chains (2019)
- Hard Surface (2021)

=== With Missing Seven Hazard ===
- Global Warning (Single, 2007)
- Rocket the U.S. (2008)
- Nature Revolt Remix (2009)
- War of the Minds (2010)
- Real Freedom (2018)

=== Peter Missing solo ===
- Rotation (1997)
- Insel 138 (1998)
- Cracked Ocean (1998)
- Low Denominator (1999)
- Redirect (2021)
- river of creative forms (2022)
