= Don Dietrich (musician) =

American saxophonist

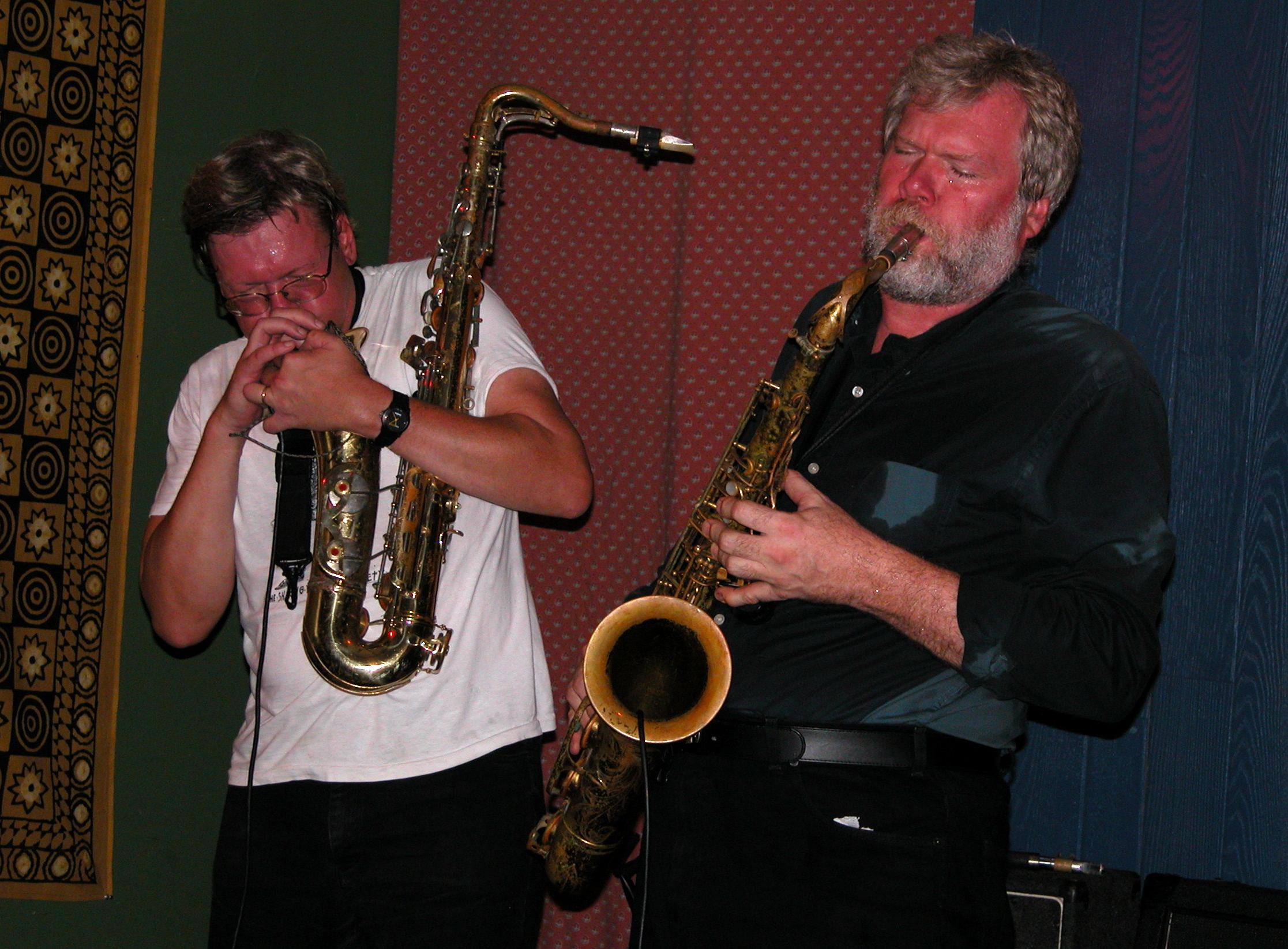
Don Dietrich (left) & Jim Sauter; original photo courtesy Seth Tisue

Don Dietrich is a saxophonist and founding member of New York City based improvisational group, Borbetomagus.

Recently, he has become involved with the noise/free jazz "supergroup" The New Monuments (with C. Spencer Yeh and Ben Hall).
