= Spirits Burning =

American musical collective

- Also known as: Spirits Burning & Bridget Wishart; Spirits Burning & Clearlight; Spirits Burning & Daevid Allen; Spirits Burning & Michael Moorcock; Spirits Burning & Thom The World Poet; Spirits Burning vs. Spaceship Eyes
- Origin: San Francisco, California, USA
- Genres: Space rock; progressive rock; psychedelic rock
- Years active: 1986-91, 1996–present
- Labels: Purple Pyramid Records / Cleopatra Records, Deko Entertainment, Noh Poetry Records, Gonzo Multimedia, Voiceprint, Black Widow, Mellow Records, Musea (Gazul)
- Members: Don Falcone; Bridget Wishart; Full List of Spirits Burning crew members, by album.
- Past members: Daevid Allen (d. 2015)
- Website: spiritsburning.com

Spirits Burning is a musical collective that features musicians associated with space rock and progressive rock, including input from members of Blue Öyster Cult, Clearlight, Gong, and Hawkwind. Spirits Burning is overseen by American composer/producer Don Falcone.

== History ==
In 1996, Falcone resurrected Spirits Burning. Spirits Burning was one of his first San Francisco bands, for which Falcone played bass and keyboards. Their first recording for a CD was a cover of the King Crimson song Red, on the tribute album “Schizoid Dimension,” released in 1997. Spirits Burning signed with French label Musea Records in 1998 and the group released their first album New Worlds By Design on Musea affiliate Gazul Records.

Falcone set Spirits Burning on their continuing mission just as the internet began to open up an index of collaborative possibilities that studio recordings and logistics previously precluded: the chance for content-creators to recruit musicians on an ad hoc basis across the ether; musicians they’d have scant hope of playing with face-to-face.

In the space rock community, Falcone has gotten success out of this approach. A survey of his first 10 years under the Spirits Burning banner throws up some different contributors (including Daevid Allen, Porcupine Tree’s Steven Wilson, and High Tide’s Simon House).

In 2017, Spirits Burning performed live twice in England. The line-up was Steve Bemand, Richard Chadwick, Kev Ellis, Don Falcone, Colin Kafka, Martin Plumley, and Bridget Wishart.

== Notable collaborations ==
Falcone, Albert Bouchard (formerly of Blue Öyster Cult), and writer Michael Moorcock have collaborated in Spirits Burning (under the name Spirits Burning & Michael Moorcock) to adapt three of Moorcock's novels: An Alien Heat, The Hollow Lands, and The End of All Songs. Moorcock also plays harmonica on three songs on the 2021 Spirits Burning album Evolution Ritual and appeared on five tracks on the Spirits Burning CD Alien Injection, released in 2008. He is credited with singing lead vocals and playing guitar and mandolin. The performances used on the Alien Injection CD were from The Entropy Tango & Gloriana Demo Sessions.

Falcone and Bridget Wishart (formerly of Hawkwind) have collaborated in Spirits Burning (including releases under the name Spirits Burning & Bridget Wishart).

Falcone and Cyrille Verdeaux of Clearlight have collaborated in Spirits Burning (including releases under the name Spirits Burning & Clearlight).

Falcone and Daevid Allen (of Gong) have collaborated in Spirits Burning (including a single released under the name Spirits Burning & Daevid Allen).

Robert Calvert's Centigrade 232 tape recitation was first used with music on the second Spirits Burning album Reflections In A Radio Shower, released in 2001. Don Falcone took the original recording of Calvert reading his poem Centigrade 232 and integrated it into the track Drive-By Poetry. Lines from another Centigrade 232 poem ("Ode To A Crystal Set") appear on the CD's opening track Second Degree Soul Sparks.

== Discography ==
- 1999: New Worlds by Design
- 2002: Reflections in a Radio Shower
- 2006: Found in Nature
- 2008: Alien Injection
- 2008: Earth Born (by Spirits Burning & Bridget Wishart)
- 2009: Our Best Trips: 1998 to 2008
- 2009: Golden Age Orchestra (by Spirits Burning & Thom The World Poet)
- 2009: Bloodlines (by Spirits Burning & Bridget Wishart)
- 2010: Crazy Fluid
- 2011: Behold The Action Man
- 2013: Healthy Music In Large Doses (by Spirits Burning & Clearlight)
- 2014: Make Believe It Real (by Spirits Burning & Bridget Wishart)
- 2015: Starhawk
- 2016: The Roadmap In Your Head (by Spirits Burning & Clearlight)
- 2017: "The Roadmap In Your Heart" b/w "Another Roadmap In Your Head" and "An Ambient Heat" (7-inch single, by Spirits Burning & Daevid Allen)
- 2018: An Alien Heat (by Spirits Burning & Michael Moorcock)
- 2020: The Hollow Lands (by Spirits Burning & Michael Moorcock)
- 2021: Evolution Ritual
- 2022: Recollections Of Instrumentals
- 2023: The End Of All Songs - Part 1 (by Spirits Burning & Michael Moorcock)
- 2024: Live At Kozfest
- 2025: The End Of All Songs - Part 2 (by Spirits Burning & Michael Moorcock)
- 2026: Fragments (by Spirits Burning & Bridget Wishart)

== Crew members and some of their sightings ==
The liner notes for each Spirits Burning album include the crew members (a list of musicians or lyricists who contributed to the album) and some of their sightings (a list of some of the bands or artists that each crew member has played with or is associated with).

This list includes crew members who have contributed to a Spirits Burning song or album. Notable associations are included.

=== A ===
- Igor Abuladze: The Humans
- Dave Adams
- Daevid Allen: Gong, Brainville, Planet Gong, Soft Machine
- Andy Anderson: The Cure, Hawkwind
- Bruce Anderson
- Dave Anderson: Hawkwind
- Karen Anderson
- Yanik Lorenzo Andreatta
- Carroll Ashby
- Jsun Atoms: The Upsidedown
- Takahashi Atsuki (Tsuyama Atsushi): Acid Mothers Temple
- Ryan Avery

=== B ===
- Ileesha Bailey
- Harvey Bainbridge: Hawkwind, Hawklords, Sonic Assassins
- Mark Barkan
- Giuliano Beber
- Steve Bemand: Hawkwind
- K. Soren Bengtsson
- Erin Bennett Syren (band), Rockbitch
- Bond Bergland: Cluster, Factrix
- Robert Berry: 3, The Greg Kihn Band
- Louise Bialik
- Jon Birdsong: Beck Mushroom
- Eric Bloom: Blue Öyster Cult
- Andy Bole
- Paul Booth: Steve Winwood
- Albert Bouchard: Blue Öyster Cult
- Joe Bouchard: Blue Öyster Cult
- Paul Braunbehrens
- Scott Brazieal: 5uu's
- Alan Sitar Brown
- Roz Bruce
- Vaughan Burton Jr.

=== C ===
- J. J. Cache
- Robert Calvert: Hawkwind, Hawklords, Sonic Assassins
- Michael Camaro
- Dave Cameron: ST 37
- Marc Capelle
- Kevin Carnes: The Beatnigs, Consolidated
- Nat Carsten
- Daniel Todd Carter
- Cotton Casino: Acid Mothers Temple
- Anne Marie Castellano
- Richie Castellano: Blue Öyster Cult
- Richard Chadwick: Hawkwind
- Keith Christmas: David Bowie
- Michael Clare
- Graham Clark: Gong
- Andy Colquhoun The Deviants, Pink Fairies
- Alisa Coral
- Jaime Cortinas
- Chas Cronk: Strawbs
- David Cross: King Crimson
- Crum Hawkwind
- Carlton Crutcher: ST 37
- Joel Crutcher: ST 37

=== D ===
- Andy Dalby: Arthur Brown's Kingdom Come
- Tom Dambly: Simpático
- Roger Davenport
- Alan Davey: Hawkwind, Hawklords
- Marcus Davis
- Dead Fred: Hawkwind, Hawklords
- Len Del Rio
- Herb Diamant
- Joe Diehl
- Matt Dowse
- Jim Dunn
- Judy Dyble: Fairport Convention

=== E ===
- Ian East: Gong
- Paul Eggleston
- John Ellis: The Vibrators, Peter Gabriel, The Stranglers, Peter Hammill
- Kev Ellis
- Doug Erickson
- Sarah Evans
- Thom Evans
- Detlev Everling
- Renate Everling

=== F ===
- David Falcone
- Don Falcone
- Ernie Falcone
- Stella Ferguson
- Francesco Festi
- Dave Figoli
- Don Fleming
- Catherine Foreman
- Paul Fox
- Ana Torres Fraile
- Michael Freitas
- Ross the Boss Friedman: The Dictators, Manowar, Shakin' Street
- Craig Fry
- Erin Fusco

=== G ===
- Knut Gerwers
- Steve Gianolio-jones
- Andy Glass: Solstice
- Jack Gold-Molina
- Fabio Golfetti: Gong
- Uto G. Golin
- Claire Grainger
- Grawer
- Chris Green
- Tommy Grenas: Chrome, Nik Turner
- Mike Grimes

=== H ===
- Rick Hake
- Caron Hansford
- Ami Hassinen: Nemesis
- Steve Hayes
- Paul Hayles: Hawkwind, Sonic Assassins
- Tom Heasley
- Amy Hedges
- Scott Heller
- Frank Hensel
- Sam Herzberg
- Keith Hill
- Steve Hillage: Gong, System 7, Clearlight
- Higashi Hiroshi: Acid Mothers Temple
- David Hirschberg The Brain Surgeons
- Chris Hopgood
- Michael Holt: Mushroom
- Niall Hone: Hawkwind, Mandragora
- Simon House: Hawkwind, David Bowie, Third Ear Band
- Carl Howard
- Ron Howden: Nektar
- Mike Howlett: Gong
- Warren Huegel
- Edward Huson

=== I ===
- Indy

=== J ===
- David Jackson: Van der Graaf Generator
- David James: Spearhead, Thessalonians
- Jerry Jeter
- Barney Jones
- Langdon Jones: New Worlds (magazine)
- Mason Jones
- Nigel Mazlyn Jones

=== K ===
- Colin Kafka
- Jyrki Kastman: Nemesis
- Makoto Kawabata: Acid Mothers Temple
- Kenny Kearney
- Simon Keevil
- Keith The Bass: Planet Gong, Here & Now
- Suharo Keizo: Acid Mothers Temple
- Peter Knight: Steeleye Span
- Keith Kniveton: Hawkwind
- William Kopecky
- Chris Kovacs

=== L ===
- David L
- Mika Laakso (Dark Santtu)
- Tiffany Lamson
- Rick Landar: King Black Acid
- Jon Leidecker (Wobbly): Negativland
- Alison Lewis
- Susie Loraine

=== M ===
- Gitta Mackay (Gitta Walther): Silver Convention
- Bert MacKenzie
- Emma MacKenzie
- Kenneth Magnusson
- Didier Malherbe: Gong
- Matt Malley: Counting Crows
- Mack Maloney
- Tony Mann
- Fabrizio Mattuzzi
- Nick May
- Michael Mayr
- Toby Marks (Banco de Gaia)
- Dana McCoy
- George McDonald
- Pierce E. McDowell
- Buck McGibbony
- Mac McIntyre
- Greg McKella
- Mychael Merrill
- Judy Merryweather
- Sindisiwe Mhlanga
- Dave Mihaly: Mushroom
- Bob Mild: The Upsidedown
- Danny Miranda: Blue Öyster Cult, Queen + Paul Rodgers
- Gabriel Monticello
- Mal Mooney: Can
- Michael Moorcock: Hawkwind
- Mike Moskowitz
- Mr Dibs: Hawkwind

=== N ===
- Deb Nash
- Giorgio Cesare Neri
- Roger S. Neville-Neil
- David Newhouse: The Muffins
- Juliette Norrmén-Smith

=== O ===
- Sean Orr
- Monty Oxymoron: The Damned

=== P ===
- John Pack
- Alec Palao: Mushroom
- Stephen Palmer
- Ursula Pank Third Ear Band
- Jasper Pattison
- Gary Parra
- Pete Pavli: High Tide
- Doug Pearson
- Erik Pearson: Mushroom
- Stefanie Petrik
- John Pierpoint
- Neil Pinnock
- Martin Plumley
- John Pluth
- Josh Pollock: Gong, Mushroom
- Nic Potter: Van der Graaf Generator
- Nigel Potter
- Lee Potts
- Mark Poulin
- John Purves (Purjah)
- Ken Pustelnik: The Groundhogs

=== R ===
- Jay Radford
- Jules Radino: Blue Öyster Cult
- Randy Raine-Reusch
- Kent Randolph: Amoeba Music
- Robert Rich
- Jerry Richards: Hawkwind, Hawklords
- Teed Rockwell
- Donald Roeser (Buck Dharma): Blue Öyster Cult
- Paul Rudolph (musician) Pink Fairies, Hawkwind, The Deviants
- Cyndee Lee Rule

=== S ===
- Trey Sabatelli: Jefferson Starship
- Nick Saloman: The Bevis Frond
- Camilla Saly
- Dean Santomeiri
- Andrew Scott
- Paul Sears: The Muffins
- Jonathan Segel: Camper Van Beethoven, Sparklehorse
- Karl E. H. Seigfried
- Steffe Sharpstrings: Planet Gong, Here & Now
- Adrian "Ade" Shaw: Hawkwind, The Bevis Frond, Hawklords
- Andy Shernoff: The Dictators, Ramones
- Billy Sherwood: Yes, William Shatner, Asia
- Fabienne Shine:Shakin' Street, Chrome
- Chris Shropshire
- Mick Slattery: Hawkwind
- Jessie May Smart: Steeleye Span
- Bruce Smith
- Graham Smith String Driven Thing, Van der Graaf Generator
- Judge Smith: Van der Graaf Generator
- Scotty Smith
- David Speight
- Karen Stackpole
- Kurt Statham: Mushroom
- Craig Stewart
- Mark Stone: ST 37
- Dave Sturt: Gong
- Dave Susser
- Steve Swindells: Hawkwind, Hawklords

=== T ===
- Jay Tausig
- Brian Tawn
- Steve Taylor
- Shannon Taylor-Wishart
- Scott L . Telles: ST 37
- Thom The World Poet
- Huw Thomas
- Pat Thomas: Mushroom
- PJ Thomas
- Danny Thompson Jr: Hawkwind
- Trev Thoms: Inner City Unit
- Larry Thrasher: Psychic TV, Thee Majesty, Pigface
- Vicente Tiburcio
- Kavus Torabi: Gong
- Melissa Trancess
- Theo Travis: Gong, Soft Machine Legacy, Robert Fripp
- Nik Turner: Hawkwind, Inner City Unit
- Twink: Pretty Things, Pink Fairies

=== V ===
- Jean van den Elsen
- Cyrille Verdeaux: Clearlight
- Lux Vibratus: Nektar, Chrome

=== W ===
- Alan Wall
- Miles Walsh
- Tim Walters
- Darryl Way: Curved Air
- Carol Weeks
- Marc Weinstein: Amoeba Music
- Brian Wensing
- Peter Wetherbee: Praxis
- Richard Wileman
- Dave Willey: Hamster Theatre, Thinking Plague
- Paul Williams
- Tracy Lee Williams
- Harry Williamson
- Randy Wilson
- Steven Wilson: Porcupine Tree
- Bridget Wishart: Hawkwind
- Alisa Wood
- Brooke Lynn Wright
- Pete Wyer
- Max Wynter

=== X ===
- Don Xaliman

=== Y ===
- Hoshiko Yamane: Tangerine Dream
- Pete Yarbrough
- Greg Yaskovic
- Steve York: Vinegar Joe, Manfred Mann Chapter Three

=== Z ===
- Yur Zappa
- Duane Zarakov
- Zero (Luis Davila)
