= Centigrade 232 =

Studio album by Robert Calvert
- Released: 8 October 2007
- Recorded: 1986
- Genre: Spoken word
- Label: Voiceprint Records

Robert Calvert chronology
| At the Queen Elizabeth Hall (1989) | Centigrade 232 (2007) |

Centigrade 232 is an album and a book of poems by English writer and musician Robert Calvert, recorded in 1986 and released in 2007. The poem Centigrade 232 was set to music by Spirits Burning in 2001. Some titles were set to music by Hawkwind and issued as The Brock/Calvert Project in 2007.

== Overview ==
Calvert had regarded himself first and foremost as a poet and writer and his original involvement with the English rock group Hawkwind from 1971 was as a lyricist and narrator of "space-age poetry" at gigs. It was later as a solo performer and his second spell with Hawkwind from 1976 that he had become more recognised as being a singer and front-man of a rock band, but he continued actively writing poems and plays during this time.

In 1977 a collection of his poems were compiled and published by Quasar books, the title being (allegedly) the temperature at which writing paper burns "signifying the writer destroying his rough drafts". This is an allusion to the Ray Bradbury novel Fahrenheit 451 and possibly the film thereof, 451 °F being equivalent to 232 Centigrade.

Some of the poems are pieces he had performed with Hawkwind during the Space Ritual show, such as "The First Landing on Medusa" which was performed as "The Awakening". Others would be adapted into Hawkwind songs, such as "The Starfarer's Despatch" and "The Clone's Poem" which were combined into "Spirit of the Age". The poem "Circle Line" won the Capital Radio Poetry Award in 1975. The book received a launch party at Battersea Arts Centre, London, which also featured performances from Cream lyricist Pete Brown and Gong's Daevid Allen and Gilli Smyth.

In 1986 Calvert started issuing cassette tapes of his work under the imprint of Harbour Publications. One of these tapes was the full recitation of the Centigrade 232 collection. Other releases comprised recitations of the unpublished Earth Ritual poems collection and two music tapes, Blueprints from the Cellar Volumes 1 and 2, which contained home demos of songs, some of which would be released in completed form on the albums Freq and Test Tube Conceived.

Calvert's Centigrade 232 tape recitation was first used with music on the second Spirits Burning album Reflections in a Radio Shower, released in 2001. Don Falcone took the original recording of Calvert reading his poem Centigrade 232 and integrated it into the track Drive-By Poetry. Lines from another Centigrade 232 poem ("Ode To A Crystal Set") appear on the CD's opening track Second Degree Soul Sparks.

In October 2007, Voiceprint Records re-issued Centigrade 232 in a package containing both a reprint of the 1977 book and a CD of the 1986 recitations.

Voiceprint Records label head Rob Ayling passed a copy of the cassette tape of Calvert's recitations to Dave Brock and asked him to set some of the titles to music. The music was played by the then current line-up of Hawkwind, but some titles were lost at the mixing stage delaying the release until August 2007. The release was credited to the Brock/Calvert Project.

== Centigrade 232 album ==
=== Track listing ===
All titles by Robert Calvert

The First Landing on Medusa

1. "Swing"
2. "Ode to a Crystal Set"
3. "The First Landing on Medusa"
4. "Ode to a Time Flower"
5. "Some Sketches of a Hand"
6. "The Starfarer's Despatch"
7. "Song of the Gremlin"
8. "The Pause"
9. "The Clone's Poem"
10. "Centigrade 232"
11. "Fahrenheit 451"
12. "The Naked And Transparent Man Gives Thanks"

Buster Keaton and the Virgin Sperm Dancer

1. "Dance Steps"
2. "Lines for a Conception Card"
3. "Lady with a Looking Glass"
4. "The Siren"
5. "Buster Keaton and the Virgin Sperm Dancer"
6. "Your Time"
7. "A Refusal To Mourn The Removal, By Surgery, Of Two Benign Tumours"
8. "Circle Line"
9. "An Unposted Letter"

The Urban Mountaineer

1. "The Clerk"
2. "Cleaning A Rapidograph"
3. "A Letter of Complaint to the Council"
4. "Fly on the Screen"
5. "The Recovery"
6. "Nail Biter"
7. "Mountaineering in Suburbia"
8. "The Last Kitten"
9. "Caterpillar"
10. "Snowfall"
11. "Insomnia"
12. "Storm"
13. "Overslept"
14. "The Day We Hunted Birdsong"
15. "Fountains in the Park"
16. "Coots"
17. "Ragworm in a Rock Pool"
18. "Shell"
19. "Beachcombing"

Ragworm in a Rock Pool

1. "Seagulls (1)"
2. "Seagulls (2)"
3. "Recollections of a Seaside Love Affair"
4. "The Drowned Man"

The Red Baron Regrets

1. "Churchill's Secret Rock Deal"
2. "The Red Baron Regrets"
3. "John Keats at Margate"
4. "Voodoo Child (In Memory of Jimi Hendrix)"
5. "The Legend of Ezra Pound"

== Use by Spirits Burning ==
=== Tracks with Calvert ===
Calvert appears on two tracks on the CD Reflections In a Radio Shower. All words by the vocalists and lyricists on the track. All music by all personnel on the track.

- Track 1: "Second Degree Soul Sparks"
- Track 3: "Drive-By Poetry"

=== Personnel ===
- Daevid Allen – track 1 guitar, end vocals' track 3 haiku voice
- Karen Anderson - track 3 chorus
- Robert Calvert – track 1 recitation of lines from "Ode To A Crystal Set"; track 3 "Centigrade 232" reading
- Michael Clare – track 1 bass
- Don Falcone – track 1 bass synth, samples, outro vibes; track 3 bass, digi scrubs, chorus
- Carl Howard – track 3 main synth
- Jerry Jeter – track 3 guitar
- Roger Neville-Neil – track 1 and 3 lyricist
- Steve Palmer – track 1 swirling synths; track 3 additional synth and Mac sounds
- Neil Pinnock – track 1 and 3 didgeridoo
- Bruce Smith – track 3 drums
- ST 37 – track 3 intro crashes and godzilla spikes
- Thom The World Poet – track 1 and 3 vocals
- Trevor Thoms – track 1 guitar
- Paul Williams – track 1 vibes, synths, trons

== Use by The Brock/Calvert Project ==
=== Track listing ===
All words by Robert Calvert. All music by Dave Brock, except 9 and 11 by Brock and Jason Stuart

1. "First Landing on Medusa"
2. "The Siren"
3. "Ode to a Timeflower"
4. "Small Boy (The Swing)"
5. "Centigrade 232"
6. "Dance Steps"
7. "The Naked and the Transparent Man Gives Thanks"
8. "The Cupboard"
9. "Long Time Friend"
10. "Letter of Complaint to the Council"
11. "Locked In"
12. "Some Sketches of a Hand"

=== Personnel ===
- Robert Calvert – recitation
- Dave Brock – guitar, synths, keyboards, vocals
- Jason Stuart – keyboards
- Alan Davey – bass
- Richard Chadwick – drums
- Trixie Smith – vocals

== Release history ==
- 1977 – Quasar Publications – book
- 1986 – Harbour Publications – Cassette tape
- 2001 – Gazul Records (GA 8647.AR) – Spirits Burning Reflections in a Radio Shower CD
- October 2007 – Voiceprint Records (VP403CDMO) – CD and book
- August 2007 – Voiceprint Records (HAWKVP42CD) – The Brock/Calvert Project CD
