= Les Contes du singe fou =

Studio album by Clearlight
- Released: 1977
- Recorded: Léo Clarens Studio, France; November 1976
- Genre: Progressive rock
- Length: 41:54
- Label: Isadora
- Producer: Joël Dugrenot

Clearlight chronology
Forever Blowing Bubbles (1975)	Les Contes du singe fou (1977)	Visions (1978)

Les Contes du singe fou (roughly translated, Tales of the Mad Monkey) is a progressive rock album by Clearlight, released in 1977, on Isadora Records in France.

Returning again to France, Clearlight turned to conceptual space rock with science fiction lyrics. (The lyrics do not have anything to do with a mad monkey, however.) Les Contes du singe fou is the only Clearlight album in which vocals and lyrics play a significant role. In reverse of the previous album, the title is in French, but all lyrics are in English. This is not apparent from the cover, which contains no song titles on the outside. English Lyrics with French translations are printed on the cover's gatefold. Musically, the album contains psychedelic, new age, and jazz fusion elements.

== Cover art ==
The cover has an elaborate fantasy illustration that makes reference to song titles, previous album covers, and a member of the group. The artist is not explicitly credited, but his signature, "Solé" is visible. The picture, which continues onto the back cover, shows a character on the front with a monkey's head on a human body, chest and one hand visible but otherwise wearing a fantastic multi-coloured suit with cape. On the back there is an unclothed monkey with a human's head, suggesting the heads of a human and a monkey have been exchanged. The character on the front is wearing skates, and the character on the back is holding a large key, referencing the two suite titles. The two characters are connected by a cable which is an electrical connection to a box on the front cover character's chest, similar to the box of dials and cables on the cover of Clearlight Symphony. The cable turns into an umbilical cord where it attaches to the character on the back cover. Other cables from the box lead to the monkey's head and ears, and some lead out of sight, as also seen on the covers of Clearlight Symphony and Forever Blowing Bubbles.

Although planets appear to be suspended in space, the characters are sitting upon and hanging from crescent moons, and the front cover moon and one of the planets on the back are made of a substance that is dripping, suggesting there is gravity present in a downward direction. The crescent moons are physically crescent, rather than in shadow, making the whole cover look like a stage prop background. The monkey on the back holds a miniature planet Earth between its feet. A rainbow hangs impossibly in space, despite the supposed lack of atmosphere. (Rainbows appear on all Clearlight covers, with the exception of Delired Cameleon Family.) A bubble also floats in space, similar to those seen on Forever Blowing Bubbles.

On the back, there is a planet made of bricks, and a keyhole in one brick exactly matches the key held by the monkey. A small moon inscribed with an aum symbol orbits the brick planet, almost touching it. Finally, the crescent moon on the back is sprouting a huge weed-like plant with berries, undoubtedly a reference to "Moonweed", Tim Blake's nickname.

== Track listing ==
=== Side one ===
1. "The Key (La Clé)"
  - "The Outsider (Je suis d'ailleurs)" (Francis Mandin / Cyrille Verdeaux) – 5:27
  - "A Trip to Orient" (Verdeaux)
  - "Lightsleeper's Despair (Angoisses d'un insomniaque)" (Mandin / Verdeaux) – 8:38 (parts 2 and 3)
2. "Soliloque" (Verdeaux) – 5:35

The track list and composer credits on the label are incomplete and possibly mixed up. It is likely the vocal tracks were to be credited to Mandin / Verdeaux, and instrumental tracks to Verdeaux, as shown here.

=== Side two ===
1. "Time Skater (Le Patineur du temps)" (Mandin / Verdeaux) – 22:14
  - "Countdown to Eternity (Compte à rebours pour l'eternité)"
  - "The Cosmic Crusaders (Les Croisés du cosmos)"
  - "Stargazer (Voyeur d'étoiles)"

== Personnel ==
- Cyrille Verdeaux – piano, harpsichord, organ, ARP Odyssey, timbales
- Ian Bellamy – vocals
- Didier Lockwood – violin, bass violin
- Yves Chouard – guitars
- Francis Mandin – ARP Odyssey
- Tim Blake – EMS and VCS3 synthesizers
- Joël Dugrenot – bass, producer
- Serge Aouzi – drums, percussion
