= The Black Field =

Studio album by PGR/Thessalonians
- Released: 1989
- Recorded: April – June 1986
- Studio: Poolside Studios (San Francisco, California)
- Genre: Experimental; industrial; ambient
- Length: 35:42
- Label: Silent
- Producer: Kim Cascone

Thessalonians chronology
Imbrication 2 (1988)	The Black Field (1989)	Soulcraft (1993)

The Black Field is the third split album by PGR/Thessalonians, released in 1989 by Silent.

== Reception ==
Factsheet Five awarded The Black Field five out of five stars and said described the music as "spare, almost minimal in much of its sound, with a "late night experimental radio" appeal" Option described the music as "not a noise fest, it is usually low key, sparse in a way, and nearly ambient" and the "ebb and flow of rumbling guitar feedback opens things up as zips and drips irregularly occur."

== Track listing ==
All lyrics are written by Jorge Luis Borges.

Side one
No.	Title	Length
1.	"Knots"	2:20
2.	"Latitude"	4:49
3.	"Code"	0:56
4.	"Spherics"	5:50
5.	"Spherics"	5:45

Side two
No.	Title	Length
1.	"Appassionata"	1:52
2.	"The Black Field"	9:14
3.	"Tabula Rasa"	4:46

== Personnel ==
Adapted from The Black Field liner notes.

Thessalonians

- Kim Cascone – instruments, production
- David Gardner – instruments
- David James – instruments
- Kurt Robinson – instruments
- Larry Thrasher – instruments

Additional performers

- Gary Weisberg (as G. Richard Weisberg) – spoken word

Production and design

- Jorge Luis Borges – text
- Kathleen Cascone – typography
- Leonard Marcel – engineering

== Release history ==
Region	Date	Label	Format	Catalog
United States	1989	Silent	LP	SR8905
