= Imbrication 2: An Investigaton Into Documenting Change Systems =

Studio album by PGR/Thessalonians
- Released: 1988
- Recorded: May – June 1986
- Studio: Poolside Studios (San Francisco, California)
- Genre: Experimental; industrial
- Label: Angakok
- Producer: Kim Cascone

Thessalonians chronology
| The Unwinding (1986) | Imbrication 2: An Investigaton Into Documenting Change Systems (1988) | The Black Field (1989) |

Imbrication 2: An Investigaton Into Documenting Change Systems the second split album by PGR/Thessalonians, released in 1988 by Angakok.

== Track listing ==
Side one
| No. | Title | Length |
|---|---|---|
| 1. | "The Sadness of Saints" |
| 2. | "Spherics" |

Side two
| No. | Title | Length |
|---|---|---|
| 1. | "Mapping Again" |
| 2. | "Ornament on a Rotated Grid" |

== Personnel ==
Adapted from the Imbrication 2: An Investigaton Into Documenting Change Systems liner notes.

Thessalonians

- Kim Cascone – instruments, production, mixing
- David Gardner – instruments
- David James – instruments
- Kurt Robinson – instruments
- Larry Thrasher – instruments

Production and design

- Jerry Beasley – engineering
- Kathleen Cascone (as Kathleen Parker) – typography
- Anthony Michael King (as AMK) – design
- Leonard Marcel – mixing

== Release history ==
| Region | Date | Label | Format | Catalog |
|---|---|---|---|---|
| Japan | 1988 | Angakok | CS | AKT011 |
