= The Unwinding (album) =

Live album by Thessalonians
- Released: 1986
- Recorded: May 1986
- Studio: Various: Farm; (San Francisco, California); KZSC; (Santa Cruz, California)
- Genre: Experimental; drone
- Label: Silent

Thessalonians chronology
| The Concentration of Light Prior to Combustion (1986) | The Unwinding (1986) | Imbrication 2: An Investigaton Into Documenting Change Systems (1988) |

The Unwinding a live album by Thessalonians, released in 1986 by Silent.

== Track listing ==
Side one
| No. | Title | Length |
|---|---|---|
| 1. | "Wander" |
| 2. | "Unwind Pt I" |
| 3. | "Return to the Farm" |

Side two
| No. | Title | Length |
|---|---|---|
| 1. | "III Staggers and Falls" |
| 2. | "Unwind Pt II" |

== Personnel ==
Adapted from the liner notes of The Unwinding.

Thessalonians

- Kim Cascone – instruments
- David Gardner – instruments
- David James – instruments
- Kurt Robinson – instruments
- Larry Thrasher – instruments

== Release history ==
| Region | Date | Label | Format | Catalog |
|---|---|---|---|---|
| United States | 1986 | Silent | CS | SR9010 |
| United States | 1990 | Silent | CS | SR9012 |
