= The Concentration of Light Prior to Combustion =

Studio album / Live album by PGR/Thessalonians
- Released: 1986
- Recorded: June 16, 1986
- Studio: Various: Club Foot; (San Francisco, California); Poolside Studios; (San Francisco, California)
- Genre: Experimental; drone
- Length: 58:56
- Label: Banned

Thessalonians chronology
The Concentration of Light Prior to Combustion (1986)	The Unwinding (1986)

The Concentration of Light Prior to Combustion the debut split album of PGR/Thessalonians, released in 1986 by Banned Production.

== Track listing ==
Side one
No.	Title	Artist	Length
1.	"Weaponry in Four Stages (Extractions)" (Stage 1)	PGR	3:02
2.	"Weaponry in Four Stages (Extractions)" (Stage 2)	PGR	9:09
3.	"Weaponry in Four Stages (Extractions)" (Stage 3)	PGR	9:56
4.	"Weaponry in Four Stages (Extractions)" (Stage 4)	PGR	8:44

Side two
No.	Title	Artist	Length
1.	"Cries of Children, Cries of Stone"	Thessalonians	7:18
2.	"The Grid Loses Importance"	Thessalonians	13:35
3.	"Twilight Becomes You"	Thessalonians	7:12

== Personnel ==
Adapted from the liner notes of The Concentration of Light Prior to Combustion.

Thessalonians

- Kim Cascone – instruments, mixing (B1-B3)
- David Gardner – instruments, mixing (B1-B3)
- David James – instruments, mixing (B1-B3)
- Kurt Robinson – instruments, mixing (B1-B3)
- Larry Thrasher – instruments, mixing (B1-B3)

PGR

- Kim Cascone – instruments
- Dine Forbate – instruments
- Larry Thrasher – instruments

Production and design

- Anthony Michael King (as AMK) – design
- Leonard Marcel – engineering (B1-B3)
- Kevin McMahon – assistant engineering (B1-B3)

== Release history ==
Region	Date	Label	Format	Catalog
United States	1986	Banned Production	CS	bP/15
