= Soulcraft =

Studio album by Thessalonians
- Released: October 1993
- Recorded: 1990 – 1992
- Studio: Poolside Studios (San Francisco, California)
- Genre: Ambient; electronic; experimental
- Length: 57:12
- Label: Silent
- Producer: Kim Cascone

Thessalonians chronology
| The Black Field (1989) | Soulcraft (1993) | Solaristics (2005) |

Soulcraft is the debut studio album of Thessalonians, released in October 1993 by Silent. The album has been described as musically stunning and groundbreaking.

== Track listing ==
All music is composed by Kim Cascone, Don Falcone, David James, Larry Thrasher, Doug Murdock and Paul Neyrinck, except for Soulcraft, which was written by Cascone. The lyrics for Be Here Now were written by Falcone.

| No. | Title | Length |
|---|---|---|
| 1. | "Absolute Equinox" | 9:37 |
| 2. | "Astronaut Voices" | 5:08 |
| 3. | "Shellac" | 5:35 |
| 4. | "Liquid Legs" | 8:14 |
| 5. | "Serious Ancient Rhythm" (Blood Red Crescent Moon Mix) | 6:37 |
| 6. | "Poverty and Solitude" | 5:33 |
| 7. | "Be Here Now" (Red Devil Mix) | 4:54 |
| 8. | "Soulcraft" (Astral Mix) | 6:35 |
| 9. | "Be Here Now" (707 Mix) | 4:59 |

== Personnel ==
Adapted from the Soulcraft liner notes.

Thessalonians

- Kim Cascone – sampler, effects, production, mixing
- Don Falcone – synthesizer
- David James – bass guitar, percussion, drum programming
- Larry Thrasher – tabla, percussion, sampler, shortwave radio
- Doug Murdock – percussion, congas
- Paul Neyrinck – computer, sampler, voice

== Release history ==
| Region | Date | Label | Format | Catalog |
|---|---|---|---|---|
| United States | 1993 | Silent | CD | SR9334 |
