= Solaristics =

Studio album by Thessalonians
- Released: May 2005
- Recorded: Springs 1992 – 1996
- Studio: Various: (Berkeley, California); (San Francisco, California)
- Genre: Ambient; experimental; trip hop
- Length: 60:04
- Label: Noh Poetry Records
- Producer: Kim Cascone

Thessalonians chronology
Soulcraft (1993)	Solaristics (2005)

Solaristics is the second studio album by Thessalonians, released in May 2005 by Noh Poetry Records. The album comprises recording sessions that were completed between 1992 and 1996.

== Reception ==
Backroad Music called Solaristics "a great lost recording" and noted the lead track "Solaristics" as being a highlight of the sessions. Stefaan Van Ryssen of Leonardo On-Line gave the album a mixed review, stating that composers Kim Cascone and Larry Thrasher have created higher quality work elsewhere but noting that "each piece brings its own atmosphere, ranging from pensive to thoughtful, or from melancholy to gloomy." The critic went on to conclude that the album is an "interesting release for historic reasons but very dated for contemporary ears."

== Track listing ==
All music is composed by Kim Cascone, Don Falcone, Paul Neyrinck and Larry Thrasher, except as noted.

No.	Title	Length
1.	"Solaristics"	8:14
2.	"Bridge 1" (Neyrinck)	0:59
3.	"E-Space"	8:32
4.	"Bridge 2" (Neyrinck)	0:42
5.	"Dust"	6:39
6.	"Bridge 3" (Falcone)	0:35
7.	"Drowning Weather"	7:09
8.	"Bridge 4" (Cascone)	0:32
9.	"Mining Camel"	5:37
10.	"Bridge 5" (Falcone)	1:06
11.	"Thinking Mouse"	3:57
12.	"Bridge 6" (Cascone)	0:30
13.	"Enharmonik"	3:15
14.	"Bridge 7" (Thrasher)	1:05
15.	"360"	11:12

== Personnel ==
Adapted from the Solaristics liner notes.

Thessalonians

- Kim Cascone – instruments, production
- Don Falcone – instruments
- Paul Neyrinck – instruments
- Larry Thrasher – instruments

Additional credits

- Karen Anderson – graphic design

== Release history ==
Region	Date	Label	Format	Catalog
United States	2005	Noh Poetry Records	CD	NPR005
United States	2012	Noh Poetry Records	DL	
