= MT-TV =

MT-TV can refer to:

- MT-TV (band)
- MT-TV (mitochondrial)
