= Splinter Test =

UK musical group

Splinter Test was used as a group name for Larry Thrasher and Genesis P-Orridge. The name was first used for a box set of reissues of the more experimental material by Psychic TV, and then it was used to issue the spoken word projects of Psychic TV or their instrumental music, before the foundation of Thee Majesty. The name refers to an essay on sampling as holographic magick by P-Orridge.

== Discography ==
- Splinter Test 1 Box Set (1993)
  - Disc A: Elipse Ov Flowers
  - Disc B: Tarot Ov Abomination
  - Disc C: Stained By Dead Horses
- Splinter Test 2 Box Set (1993)
  - Disc D: Mouth Ov Thee Knight
  - Disc E: Sugarmorphoses
  - Disc F: Cold Dark Matter
- Thee Fractured Garden (1996)
- Spatial Memory (1996)
- Electric Newspaper Issue Four: The Human Voice (1997)
- Sulphur - Low Seed Replication (1997)

== See also ==
- Psychic TV
- Thee Majesty
