= I Hear Voices =

I Hear Voices may refer to:

- I Hear Voices, a 1958 novel by Paul Ableman
- "I Hear Voices", a song by Kasabian on their 2011 album Velociraptor!
- "I Hear Voices Pt. 1", a song by MF Doom on their 2001 remastered album Operation: Doomsday
- "I Hear Voices", a song by Psychic TV on their 1987 live album Live in Heaven
- "I Hear Voices", a song by Puff Daddy on their 1999 album Forever
- "I Hear Voices", a song by Robert Calvert on their 1986 album Test-Tube Conceived
- "I Hear Voices", a song by Statik Selektah and KXNG Crooked on their 2016 album Statik KXNG
- "I Hear Voices", a song by The Hassles on their 1967 album The Hassles
- "I Hear Voices", a song by Uriah Heep on their 1998 album Sonic Origami
- "I Hear Voices", a song by Waltari on their 2009 album Below Zero

== See also ==
- "Voices", a song by Split Enz on their 1984 album See Ya 'Round
