= Siegfried (disambiguation) =

Siegfried is a masculine German given name.

Siegfried may also refer to:

- Siegfried (opera) (1876), an opera by Richard Wagner
- Siegfried (play) (1928), a play by Jean Giraudoux
- Siegfried-class coastal defense ship of the German Imperial Navy
  - SMS Siegfried, the lead ship of the class
- Siegfried Line, German defensive lines in World War I and World War II; the Germans themselves called the World War II line the Westwall
- Siegfried (band), a heavy metal band from Austria featuring singer Sandra Schleret
- Siegfried & Roy, magicians
- Siegfried Creek, a stream in Minnesota
- Wolf pack Siegfried, a wolf pack of German U-boats that operated during the Battle of the Atlantic
- The Siegfried, a type of Knightmare Frame piloted by Jeremiah Gottwald in Code Geass
- Siegfried Hall (University of Notre Dame), a residence hall at the University of Notre Dame
- "Seigfried", a song from Frank Ocean's 2016 album Blonde

== See also ==
- Karl E. H. Seigfried, musician
- Seigfried (disambiguation)
- Sigurd (disambiguation)
- Walter Siegfried, performer
