= Seganfredo =

Origin
- Meaning: "Victory and peace"
- Region of origin: Veneto, Piedmont, Aosta Valley, Italy

Other names
- Variant forms: Seganfreddo, Segafredo, Siffredi, and Siegfried

Seganfredo (variants: Segafredo, Segafreddo, Seganfreddo, Siffredi and Sifredi) is an Italian surname. The famous Segafredo coffee company was founded by a member of this family. Rocco Tano adopted the stage name "Siffredi" taking inspiration from a character played by Alain Delon in the French film Borsalino, thus is not a member of this family.

== Distribution ==
Seganfredo and Segafredo are from Veneto, particularly from the province of Vicenza. Seganfreddo is from Aosta Valley. Siffredi and Sifredi are mainly Piedmontese.

== Etymology ==
The root is a medieval given name Sigefredo or Siffredo, of Germanic (Lombard or Frankish) origin. Latinized in Sigefredus, Sigifredus, Sichefredus, Sichifredus, Sifredus, it is analogous to the German name Siegfried. It is composed by *sigu- "victory" and *frithu- "peace, friendship", having an original meaning of "victory and peace", probably a well wishing expression.

== Theories about the origin of the surname ==
It was probably brought to Italy from some Lombard or Frankish tribe members; however, at least the Venetian branch, could have a more specific origin. Seganfredo and related variants could be originated from the Cimbrian ethnic group of Northeast Italy, of Bavarian origin.

== Demographics ==
Being a linguistically Italian surname in its present form, the members of this family are mostly concentrated on the north of Italy, as well as many having immigrated from Europe to the south of Brazil, especially to the state of Rio Grande do Sul.

== See also ==
- Cimbri
- Cimbrian language
- Sette Comuni
