= Forever Blowing Bubbles =

Studio album by Clearlight
- Released: 1975
- Recorded: The Manor Studio, UK
- Genre: Progressive rock
- Length: 36:15
- Label: Virgin
- Producer: Cyrille Verdeaux, Mick Glossop

Clearlight chronology
| Clearlight Symphony (1975) | Forever Blowing Bubbles (1975) | Les Contes du Singe Fou (1976) |

Forever Blowing Bubbles is a progressive rock album by Clearlight, released in 1975 on Virgin Records in the UK.

== Background and promotion ==
Its predecessor Clearlight Symphony having been released earlier in 1975, Cyrille Verdeaux was offered to record a follow-up effort. This time, he decided to work with a full band, using several musicians he had played with on the one-off Delired Cameleon Family project, most notably bassist Joël Dugrenot (formerly of Zao), and during the summer of 1975 studio time was booked at Virgin's Manor studio in England. English musicians sat in alongside their French counterparts, including former King Crimson violinist David Cross and two of Hatfield and the North's occasional backing vocalists The Northettes.

Following the release of the album, Clearlight embarked on a UK tour supporting Gong, with an altered line-up comprising Verdeaux, Dugrenot, Jeanneau, D'Agostini, and new members Coco Roussel (drums, ex Heldon, and later in Happy The Man), Jorge Pinchevsky (violin, later in Gong) and Francis Mandin (synthesizers).

== Music ==
The album covers many contrasting genres including psychedelic, new age, folk, rock and jazz fusion jamming, and the closing track of abstract electronic music experimentation. Only two songs have vocals, and are sung in French.

== Artwork ==
The cover depicts connections with previous albums, which became a trend in Clearlight album covers from this point onward. On the cover of Clearlight Symphony, cables connect an electrical box to a head, with one cable leading off in the distance, over the horizon. On the cover of Forever Blowing Bubbles, the same cable comes over the horizon, and ends in a disconnected DIN plug lying in the grass, blowing bubbles. The grass appears to be a redrawing of the marijuana leaves from the back cover of Delired Cameleon Family, but are now just ordinary lawn grass.

== Track listing ==
=== Side one ===
1. "Chanson" (Joël Dugrenot) – 4:50
2. "Without Words" (Cyrille Verdeaux) – 7:30
3. "Way" (Dugrenot) – 8:00

=== Side two ===
1. "Ergotrip" (Verdeaux) – 6:35
2. "Et pendant ce temps la" (Verdeaux) – 4:10
3. "Narcisse et Goldmund" (Verdeaux / Beatrice d'Eaubonne) – 2:30
4. "Jungle Bubbles" (Verdeaux) – 2:40

== Personnel ==
- Cyrille Verdeaux – grand piano, harpsichord, synthesizer, organ, glockenspiel, Mellotron, gongs, congas
- Joël Dugrenot – bass, lead vocals
- Jean-Claude d'Agostini – electric guitar, 12-string guitar, flute in C
- François Jeanneau – saxophones, flutes
- Bob Boisadan – electric piano, organ, synthesizer
- Chris Stassinopoulos – drums, congas
- David Cross – violin, electric violin
- Christian Boulé – cosmic guitar
- Gilbert Artman – percussion, drums, maracas, vibraphone
- Amanda (Parsons) and Ann (Rosenthal, of the Northettes who are mentioned in the thank-yous; see Hatfield and the North) – celestial choir
- Bruno Verdeaux – synthesizer, aquatic congas
- Brigitte Roy – vocals (on "Narcisse et Goldmund")

produced by Cyrille Verdeaux and Mick Glossop
