= Seigfried =

Seigfried is another spelling of Sigurd.

Seigfried may also refer to:

== People ==
=== Surnames ===
- Karl E. H. Seigfried, American musician
- Ray Seigfried (born 1950), American politician from Delaware

=== Given names ===
- Seigfried Gande, Papua New Guinean rugby player

== Other ==
- Seigfried Line, defensive line in World War II
- "Seigfried", a 2016 song by Frank Ocean from his album Blonde

== See also ==
- Siegfried (disambiguation)
