= David Celia =

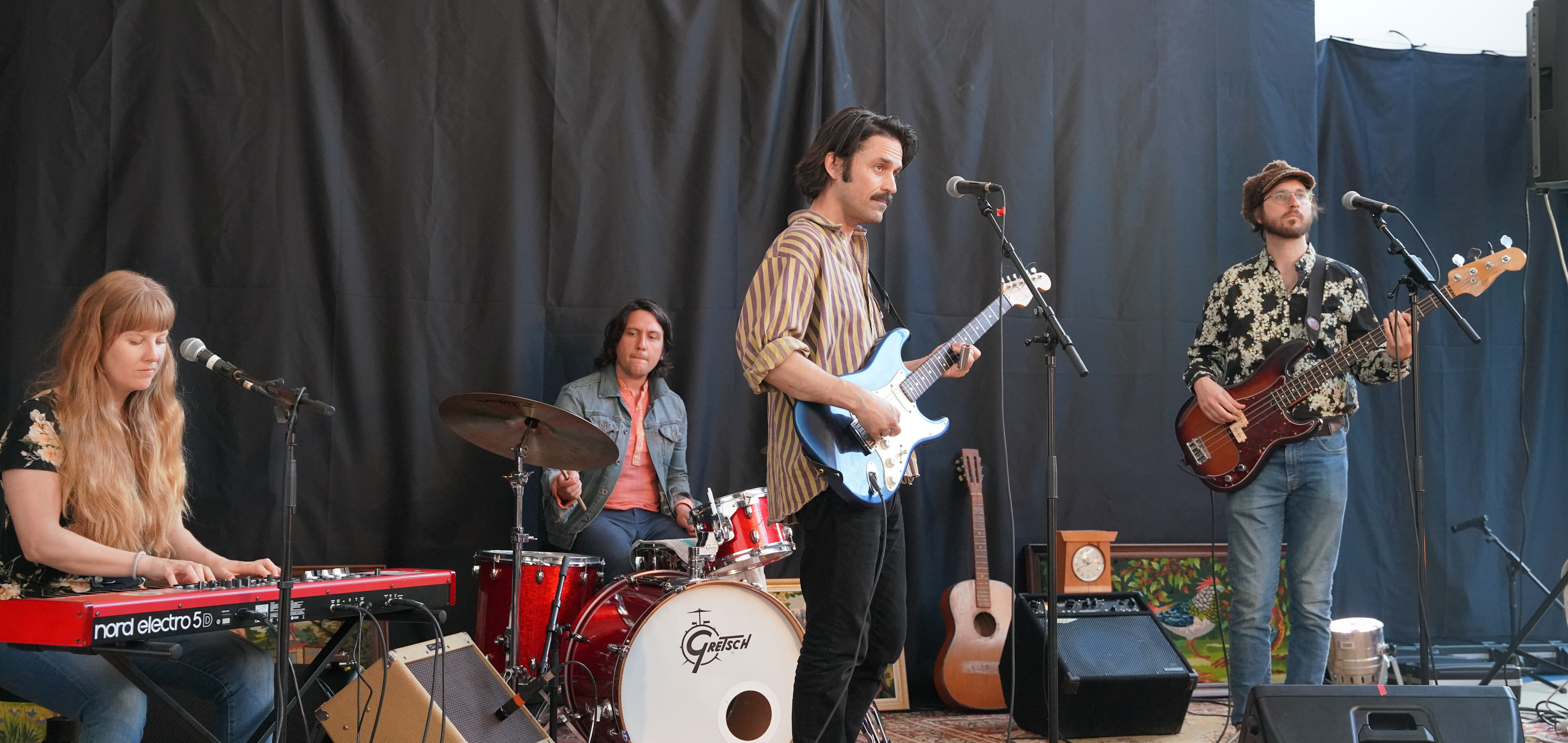

Background information
- Origin: Toronto, Ontario, Canada
- Genre: Folk rock
- Occupation: Singer-songwriter
- Instrument: Guitar
- Years active: 1989–present
- Website: www.davidcelia.com

David Celia is an independent singer-songwriter based in Toronto, Ontario, who has built an audience across Canada and in Europe. He has toured regularly since 2005.

Beginning in 1989, Celia was a member of Tarnished Gallahad featuring Matei Kajs (drums), Richard Hamelin (lead vocals, bass), Chris Mavridis (keys, vocals) and Celia (guitar, vocals). They toured Ontario and Manitoba until they disbanded in 1996.

In 1996, Celia met guitarist and songwriter Mark Stewartson and formed the band Roundhouse with Scott Reynolds (guitar), Michael Lerner (keyboards) and Geoff Hen (drums). Later, Reynolds and Lerner left the band and David Headon (bass) joined. Invisible Inc. was then formed and soon recorded a twelve-song CD entitled Poor Folks Welcome (2000). With help from engineer and studio owner Rich Dubeau, it was recorded at Taxi Stand Studio in North Toronto. Invisible Inc. played clubs in southern Ontario for several years and also embarked on a tour of the United Kingdom. The band broke up in 2001.

As a solo artist, Celia released Organica in 2002 and This Isn't Here (Universal) in 2006. He has played his guitar behind such acts as Ian & Sylvia, Andy Kim, Quartette and Icelandic artist Emiliana Torrini as well as indie artists Mike Evin and Michael Holt.

During the summers of 2003 to 2006, Celia was an instructor at the National Guitar Workshop, including week-long songwriting workshops in Canada and at the Workshop headquarters in New Milford, Connecticut.

Celia's third album, I Tried, features, among others, Joan Besen of Prairie Oyster on keyboards, Don Kerr (Ron Sexsmith, Rheostatics) and Cleave Anderson (formerly of Blue Rodeo) on drums, Gurf Morlix (Lucinda Williams) on guitar and Ben Mink (k.d. lang, FM) on violin. The album was produced by Celia, mixed by John Switzer (Jane Siberry, Andrew Cash) and mastered by Joao Carvalho.

In 2015, Celia released his 4th solo album entitled Double Mind. In that same year, he met up with Marla and they gradually formed the new project Marla & David Celia. After countless touring, including an 11-date tour across Russia, they began co-writing songs which lead to their debut Daydreamers, released in 2018 and then later with their Sophomore album Indistinct Chatter in 2021.

Celia has toured and continues to tour Canada, the UK and continental Europe regularly, including an appearance at the Glastonbury Festival in 2010.

== Discography ==
With Tarnished Gallahad

- Tarnished Gallahad, 1992
- Trapped On Earth, 1997

With Invisible Inc.

- Poor Folks Welcome, 2000

Solo

- Organica, 2002
- This Isn't Here, 2006
- I Tried, 2010
- Double Mind, 2015

With Marla & David Celia

- Daydreamers, 2018
- Indistinct Chatter, 2021
