= Hype (album) =

Studio album by Robert Calvert
- Released: September 1981
- Recorded: 1981
- Studio: Free Range Studios, Covent Gardens, London
- Genre: Rock
- Label: A-Side Records
- Producer: Robert Calvert

Robert Calvert chronology
Lucky Leif and the Longships (1975)	Hype (1981)	Freq (1984)

Hype is a 1981 album by singer Robert Calvert, the former frontman of British space-rock band Hawkwind.

It is subtitled The Songs of Tom Mahler as a tie-in to Calvert's only published novel Hype, the novel being a fictional account of the rise and death of a rock star.

The musicians used for the recording include three members of the band Bethnal, whom Calvert befriended during their support slot on Hawkwind's 1977 UK tour.

== Track listing ==
All songs written by Robert Calvert.

1. "Over My Head" - 3:11
2. "Ambitious" - 3:37
3. "It's the Same" - 2:40
4. "Hanging Out On the Seafront" - 3:46
5. "Sensitive" - 3:37
6. "Evil Rock" - 4:39
7. "We Like to Be Frightened" - 2:59
8. "Teen Ballad of Deano" - 3:01
9. "Flight 105" - 3:53
10. "The Luminous Green Glow of the Dials of the Dashboard (At Night)" - 3:52
11. "Greenfly and the Rose" - 3:51
12. "Lord of the Hornets" - 3:58

Bonus Tracks

1. "Over My Head" (different lyrics)
2. "Flight 105" (instrumental)
3. "Hanging Out On the Seafront" (different lyrics)
4. "Lord of the Hornets" (different version)

== Personnel ==
- Robert Calvert – lead vocals, guitar, synthesizer, percussion
- George Csapo – keyboards, violin, backing vocals
- Nick Michaels – rhythm guitar
- Pete Dowling – drums, electronic drums, percussion
- Trev Thoms – lead guitar
- Nik Turner – saxophone, backing vocals
- Michael Moorcock – 12-string guitar, backing vocals
- Peter Pavli – cello
- Simon House – keyboards, violin, backing vocals
- Jaqui – "hold me tight" vocals on "We Like to Be Frightened"

== Release history ==
- September 1981 – UK – A-Side Records (IF0311) vinyl
- September 1989 – UK – See For Miles Records (SEECD 278) vinyl and CD
- August 2003 – UK – Voiceprint Records (VP261CD) CD – with bonus tracks
