= Bethnal =

UK musical group

Bethnal were a British rock band formed in 1972, gaining an audience in the late 70s punk rock period. In 1978, they released two albums on Vertigo Records: Dangerous Times, produced by Kenny Laguna; and Crash Landing; produced by Jon Astley and Phil Chapman, with special thanks to Pete Townshend. They supported a number of early UK punk rock bands, including 999, Eater, The Boys, Slaughter & the Dogs, Buzzcocks and spacerock proto-punk psychedelic rock outfit, Hawkwind on their 1977 UK tour and, after disbanding, three of the members formed part of the backing band for the 1981 album Hype by former Hawkwind frontman Robert Calvert.

Key members were George Csapo (vocals, keyboards, violin), Pete Dowling (drums), Nick Michaels (guitar) and Everton Williams (bass).
