= Thessalonians (band) =

American electronic music group

- Origin: San Francisco, California, United States
- Genres: Ambient; drone; experimental; industrial
- Years active: 1986–1996
- Label: Silent
- Past members: Kim Cascone; Don Falcone; David Gardner; Pejman Hakimi; David James; Doug Murdock; Paul Neyrinck; Kurt Robinson; Larry Thrasher

Thessalonians (also known as PGR/Thessalonians) were a San Francisco-based electronic music group founded by Kim Cascone, Larry Thrasher and David James. Originally, their compositions focused on infusing collage, noise, drone and experimental music and later integrated elements of ambient, industrial and psychedelic music. Their final line-up was Cascone, Thrasher, Don Falcone, and Paul Neyrinck.

== History ==
Thessalonians were formed as a collaborative project in 1986 by keyboardist Kim Cascone, David James and percussionist Larry Thrasher. They were joined by David Gardner, and Kurt Robinson to form a quintet. This line-up released four albums, three under the name PGR/Thessalonians (the former being the name of an ambient music project by Cascone). Two of the albums were released by Silent Records, the label run by Cascone. The last release by this line-up was the PGR/Thessalonian album The Black Field.

In 1990, Cascone, Thrasher, and James were joined by Don Falcone on synthesizer, Doug Murdock on percussion, and Paul Neyrinck on sampler. They recorded the 1993 album Soulcraft for Silent. In 1996, Thessalonians disbanded and Cascone sold Silent.

Twelve years after their previous album, the band released Solaristics, which comprised music recorded by Cascone, Falcone, Neyrinck, and Thrasher between 1992 and 1996.

== Members ==
=== Final line-up ===
- Kim Cascone
- Don Falcone
- Paul Neyrinck
- Larry Thrasher

=== Previous members ===
- David Gardner
- Pejman Hakimi
- David James
- Doug Murdock
- Kurt Robinson

== Discography ==
Studio albums

- PGR/Thessalonians: The Concentration of Light Prior to Combustion (1986, Banned)
- Thessalonians: The Unwinding (1986, Silent)
- PGR/Thessalonians: Imbrication 2: An Investigaton Into Documenting Change Systems (1988, Angakok)
- PGR/Thessalonians: The Black Field (1989, Silent)
- Thessalonians: Soulcraft (1993, Silent)
- Thessalonians: Solaristics (2005, Noh Poetry)
