= Michael Holt (musician) =

American rock musician (born 1968)

- Born: 1968 (age 57–58); Boston, Massachusetts, U.S.
- Occupations: Musician; composer
- Instruments: Keyboards; vocals

Michael Holt (born 1968) is an American musician based in Truro, Massachusetts.

== Early life ==
Holt was born in Boston, Massachusetts, in 1968, and raised in New York City, where he learned to play the piano as a child.

Attending Hunter College High School in the early 1980s, he formed a band called The Connotations, which played regularly at CBGB and other downtown clubs in New York. Holt played keyboards, sang, and wrote most of the group's songs. Other members included (at various times) Dan Seiden (guitar, vocals), Dan Fisherman (drums, vocals), Simon Walsh (bass guitar, vocals), Bob Dee (guitar), Sam Bardfeld (violin, percussion, vocals), Oren Bloedow (bass guitar), Jenny Wade (bass guitar), and Alexis Stern (vocals). The band's style was a combination of ska, new wave, reggae, pop, and a dissonant, angular style they called "Bug Music".

In 1988, The Connotations broke up and Holt formed a new band called Pajama Garden, with Connotations drummer Dan Fisherman and bassist Oren Bloedow. In 1990, Holt began playing with the progressive pop band The Mommyheads, and in 1991 released his first solo album, the experimental pop Pajama Garden.

== The Mommyheads ==
In 1992, Holt and Fisherman moved to San Francisco, California, to join The Mommyheads as permanent members. Other members of The Mommyheads included Adam Cohen (now Adam Elk; guitar), Jeff Palmer (bass), and Matt Patrick (now Devin Patrick; bass, guitar). Through the '90s, The Mommyheads toured North America extensively and released several albums, the last of which was co-produced by Don Was for Geffen Records. In 1996, Holt married Cora Simone, a Canadian woman he had met on tour, who had come to live with him in San Francisco.

In 1998, The Mommyheads broke up and Holt released his contemplative folk album I'm Here With You, featuring just voice and a single nylon-stringed guitar. (The Mommyheads would reunite in 2008.) Shortly after, he began work on his alternative power-pop album Pilot Single and moved with Simone to her native Toronto.

== Toronto ==
In Toronto, Holt started a band called The Kids, with bassist Peter Murray, guitarist David Celia, and longtime Ron Sexsmith drummer Don Kerr. All four members were singers, songwriters, multi-instrumentalists, and record producers in their own right.

While living full-time in Toronto, Holt finished and released Pilot Single, released his classical-influenced album Windows, made a lo-fi split-CD with American indie-rock band Someone Still Loves You Boris Yeltsin, and toured Germany with San Francisco–based psychedelic jam-band Mushroom. He played and recorded with numerous Canadian artists, including Ron Sexsmith, David Celia, Owen Pallett, Michelle Rumball, Waleed Abdulhamid, The Hidden Cameras, Ronley Teper, Ben Gunning, Wooden Stars, Tanya Philipovich, Brian MacMillan, Karyn Ellis, and Adam Warner. He played the title track at the 20th anniversary of Bob Wiseman's record, "In Her Dream", a song he would later record for his own album Jubilation!.

In his first years in Canada, Holt became involved with a Toronto-area community called Living Circle, which explored holistic health, spirituality, and community-building, in intimate groups called "circles".

== On the road ==
In 2007, Holt began spending an increasing amount of his time on the road, mainly as a solo artist, and also with The Mommyheads, who reunited in 2008. In 2010, he made his folk-rock flavored album "The Dawn Chorus" with his band The Kids. Discovering a passion for house concerts, he began focusing his tours on them. His 2011 "Make Our Own Culture Tour" consisted of 60 intimate living room gatherings across North America and Europe, featuring a variety of other performers and participatory activities. In 2012, he released his '70s-pop tinged album "Jubilation!" and played on Bob Wiseman's record "Giulietta Masina at the Oscars Crying." He also played a European "Transition Culture Tour" of 40 intimate concerts followed by talking circles, in support of the Transition Towns sustainability movement.

In 2009, with https://marcelaucoin.bandcamp.com/, Holt founded music and conversation series called The Piano Salon. It occurred each month in a different Toronto home, featuring two sets by local acts, and between them, a conversation led by a guest speaker. The series lasted for nine years.

== "Slow" Music ==
In 2010, Holt began work on a book applying the principles of the Slow Food movement, and the Slow movement in general, to music, advancing ten practices by which the ordinary consumer can discover a more mindful, socially conscious, community-oriented, and fulfilling relationship to music.

== Cultural activities ==
Holt's interest in house concerts widened to include all kinds of cultural activities in the home. In 2014, he co-organized Toronto's First Annual Festival of House Culture, a weekend of theater, music, visual arts, poetry, comedy, film, food, conversations, and workshops, all in people's homes. Ten events were programmed within walking distance of each other, to build community by encouraging neighbors to connect through culture in their own homes.

In 2013, with Luke Jackson, Holt founded Catweazle Toronto, a monthly, public, no-microphones performance gathering based on the weekly Catweazle Club in Oxford, England.

== 24 Preludes for Piano ==
In 2015, Holt released "24 Preludes for Piano," a double album of original classical pieces inspired by early 20th Century composers such as Maurice Ravel, Alexander Scriabin, and Erik Satie. He also put on Toronto's Second Annual Festival of House Culture, this time with 19 events, and simultaneous programming in two different neighborhoods.

In 2016, Holt mounted Toronto's Third Annual Festival of House Culture, with 45 events all over the city. In 2017, he moved to Truro, Massachusetts, to provide live-in care for his aging parents.
