= MT-TV (band) =

British all-female rock band

MT-TV are a British female rock band, formed of former members of Rockbitch.

Bassist Fuse and late drummer Jo also performed in the acoustic alternative rock band Syren, along with Erin Bennett.

== Personnel ==
- Krow (Julie Worland) : vocals, songwriter
- Alex: lead guitar
- Brooke (Luci): guitar
- Fuse (Amanda Smith-Skinner): bass
- Nikki: keyboards
- Jo (Joanne Heeley) (2 November 1972 – 11 January 2012) : drums
- The Stereotypes: Bunny (Chloe), Erzulie, Kali: Backing vocals and stage show

== Discography and videography ==
- Live in France (CD mini-album) (2005)
- Shevolution (DVD) (2006)
- East/West (CD) (2008)
- North/South (DVD) (2008)
