= Themes 2 =

Studio album by Psychic TV
- Released: 1985
- Label: Temple Records TOPY 004

Cold Springs Reissue
- Psychic TV Themes 2: A Prayer For Derek Jarman

Professional ratings
Review scores
Source	Rating
AllMusic	4/5 stars

Themes 2, also referred to as Themes, Vol. 2, is a studio album by multimedia collective Psychic TV, released by Temple Records in 1985. It is the second album in the Themes series, predeced by Themes – initially an accompanying release to Force the Hand of Chance – and followed up by Themes 3, and was recorded as a soundtrack for videos by a British filmmaker Derek Jarman.

== Track listing ==
Adapted from a 1997 Cold Spring release.

All tracks are written by Genesis P-Orridge, except track 6 (co-written by P-Orridge and Larry Thrasher).

No.	Title	Length
1.	"The Loops of Mystical Union"	17:55
2.	"Elipse of Flowers"	10:58
3.	"Mylar Breeze" (Parts 1 and 2)	7:50
4.	"Mylar Breeze" (Part 3)	11:56
5.	"Prayer for Derek"	17:20
6.	"Rites of Reversal"	7:39

== Personnel ==
Adapted from the liner notes of both vinyl and CD versions of Themes 2.

- Psychic TV (namely Genesis P-Orridge, Paula P-Orridge, Alex Fergusson and John Gosling) – recording and performing
  - Genesis P-Orridge – production, artwork, liner notes, remastering (1997 release)
- Larry Thrasher – co-production and remastering (1997 release)
- Raymond Watts – engineer (credited as “Nains”)
- Steve Angel – mastering (1985 release)
