= Don Falcone =

American musician and producer

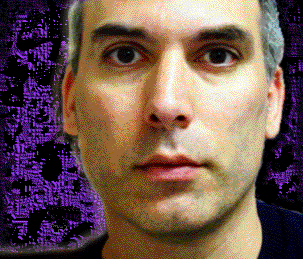

Background information
- Also known as: Don Marino Falcone, Spaceship Eyes
- Born: 5 November 1958 (age 67)
- Origin: (United States) Pennsylvania, US
- Genres: Progressive rock, psychedelic rock, space rock, ambient
- Occupations: Keyboardist, composer, bandleader, record producer, author
- Instruments: Keyboard, synthesizer, bass guitar, vocals
- Years active: 1980–present
- Labels: Noh Poetry Records, Cleopatra, Deko Entertainment, Gonzo Multimedia, Voiceprint, Black Widow, Mellow Records, Musea, Silent Records
- Member of: Spirits Burning
- Formerly of: Astralfish, Fireclan, Daevid Allen Weird Quartet (and Weird Biscuit Teatime), Grindlestone, Melting Euphoria, Quiet Celebration, Spaceship Eyes, Spice Barons, Thessalonians
- Website: Official website

Don Falcone (born November 5, 1958) is an American producer and multi-instrumentalist, and the guiding light behind the Spirits Burning space-rock collective. In Spirits Burning and other offshoot bands and projects, his primary collaborations have been with Albert Bouchard, Bridget Wishart, Cyrille Verdeaux, Daevid Allen, and English writer and musician Michael Moorcock.

Falcone was a member of Thessalonians and the original Melting Euphoria, and had a solo project called Spaceship Eyes.

In 2025, Don Falcone’s first book, One Of The Spirits Burning, A Musical Memoir, was published by Stairway Press.

== Biography ==
=== Early recordings ===
Falcone appeared on three albums released by Silent Records in 1993. He played keyboards and synthesizer on the album In A Garden of Eden by Heavenly Music Corporation, was in Satellite IV, which did the track “In A Sugarcube,” on the Fifty Years Of Sunshine compilation, and became a member of Thessalonians. On the Thessalonians album Soulcraft, Falcone played synthesizer.

In 1994, Falcone formed Melting Euphoria with Mychael Merrill and Anthony Who. Focusing on space rock, their debut recording was "Through the Strands of Time"; Falcone left the group soon after its release.

Falcone played on two more Silent Records full-length albums as part of a trio, with fellow Thessolonians Kim Cascone and Paul Neyrinck, primarily under the name Spice Barons. Spice Barons also recorded as Astralfish, Hydrosphere, Patternclear, and Satellite IV. Spice Barons, Patternclear, Astralfish and Hydrosphere appear on the Silent Records compilation UFA. The trio subsequently did an album under the name Spice Barons in 1995.

=== As Spaceship Eyes ===
In the mid-‘90's, Falcone started a solo project, Spaceship Eyes. It began as a synth project, and moved towards experimental drum ‘n' bass when he got signed to Cleopatra Records. The project was included on several drum and bass compilations and released the single "Cheebahcabra" on Hypnotic Records in 1997, followed by the LPs "Truth in the Eyes of a Spaceship" in 1998 and "Of Cosmic Repercussions" in 2000. Three of Falcone's Spaceship Eyes pieces appeared in the 1999 cult rave film Better Living Through Circuitry. Most notably, Mind The Alien from Truth In The Eyes Of A Spaceship was used as the film's opening track.

=== With Spirits Burning ===
In 1996, Falcone resurrected Spirits Burning. Spirits Burning was one of his first San Francisco bands, for which Falcone played bass and keyboards. Falcone set Spirits Burning on their continuing mission just as the internet began to open up an index of collaborative possibilities that studio recordings and logistics previously precluded: the chance for content-creators to recruit musicians on an ad hoc basis across the ether; musicians they’d have scant hope of playing with face-to-face. In the space-rock community, Falcone has done particularly well out of this approach. A survey of his first 10 years under the Spirits Burning banner throws up some surprising contributors (including Daevid Allen, Porcupine Tree’s Steven Wilson, and High Tide’s Simon House).

In 2017, Falcone performed live with Spirits Burning, alongside Steve Bemand, Richard Chadwick, Kev Ellis, Colin Kafka, Martin Plumley, and Bridget Wishart. Falcone played keyboards and also sang lead vocals on two songs.

=== Various collaborations ===
Falcone, Albert Bouchard (formerly of Blue Öyster Cult), and writer Michael Moorcock have collaborated in Spirits Burning (under the name Spirits Burning & Michael Moorcock) to adapt three of Moorcock's novels: An Alien Heat, The Hollow Lands, and The End of All Songs. Additionally, Falcone produced the 2019 Michael Moorcock & The Deep Fix release Live At The Terminal Café and was the executive producer for the band's Entropy Tango & Gloriana Demo Sessions release in 2012.

Falcone and Bridget Wishart (formerly of Hawkwind) have collaborated in Spirits Burning (including CDs released under the name Spirits Burning & Bridget Wishart), plus have an instrumental project called Astralfish.

Falcone and Cyrille Verdeaux of Clearlight have collaborated in Spirits Burning (under the name Spirits Burning & Clearlight). Additionally, Falcone produced the 2014 Clearlight release Impressionist Symphony.

Collaborating with Daevid Allen, Falcone released Glissando Grooves on Voiceprint Records in 2006. Falcone and Allen were part of Weird Biscuit Teatime, which released their first album on Voiceprint in 2005, and the 2015 follow-up, "Elevenses," which was released under the band name Daevid Allen Weird Quartet. Falcone and Allen have collaborated in Spirits Burning (including a single released under the name Spirits Burning & Daevid Allen). In addition to Spirits Burning, Allen has contributed to other Falcone bands: Astralfish, Fireclan (which included members of Melting Euphoria), and Quiet Celebration (an ambient-ethno-jazz quartet).

== Discography ==
=== Don Falcone ===
- One Of The Spirits Burning (2025) – CD compilation included with the book *One Of The Spirits Burning, A Musical Memoir*.

=== As Spaceship Eyes ===
- Kamarupa (1997)
- Truth In The Eyes Of A Spaceship (1998)
- Of Cosmic Repercussions (2000)

=== With Spirits Burning ===
- New Worlds By Design (1999)
- Reflections In A Radio Shower (2001)
- Found in Nature (2006)
- Alien Injection (2008)
- Earth Born (2008)
- Our Best Trips: 1998 to 2008 (2009)
- Golden Age Orchestra (2009)
- Bloodlines (2009)
- Crazy Fluid (2010)
- Behold The Action Man (2011)
- Healthy Music In Large Doses (2013)
- Make Believe It Real (2014)
- Starhawk (2015)
- The Roadmap In Your Head (2016)
- The Roadmap In Your Heart b/w Another Roadmap In Your Head and An Ambient Heat (2017)
- An Alien Heat (2018)
- The Hollow Lands (2020)
- Evolution Ritual (2021)
- Recollections Of Instrumentals (2022)
- The End Of All Songs - Part 1 (2023)
- Live At Kozfest (2024)
- The End Of All Songs - Part 2 (2025)
- Fragments (2026)

=== With other bands and projects ===
Astralfish

- Far Corners (2012)

Daevid Allen & Don Falcone

- Glissando Grooves (SFO Soundtribe 3) (2006)

Daevid Allen Weird Quartet (and Weird Biscuit Teatime)

- DJDDAY (2005)
- Elevenses (2016)

Falcone & Palmer

- Gothic Ships (2006)

Fireclan

- Sunrise to Sunset (2004)

Grindlestone

- one (2008)
- tone (2011)

Heavenly Music Corporation

- In a Garden of Eden (1993)

Melting Euphoria

- Through The Stands of Time (1994)
- From The Madness We Began (2013)

Michael Moorcock & the Deep Fix

- The Entropy Tango & Gloriana Demo Sessions (1994)
- Live At The Terminal Cafe (2019)

Quiet Celebration

- Quiet Celebration (2000)
- Sequel (2007)

Spice Barons

- Unidentified Floating Ambience (1994)
- Future Perfect State (1995)

Thessalonians

- Soulcraft (1993)
- Solaristics (2005)

Gary Parra's Trap

- Beyond the Status Quo (1997)

== Publications ==
- Falcone, Don (2025). One Of The Spirits Burning, A Music Memoir. Stairway Press. ISBN 9781960405319. Also published with ISBN 1960405314.

== See also ==
- List of ambient music artists
