= Delired Cameleon Family =

Studio album by Delired Cameleon Family
- Released: 1975
- Recorded: Pathé Marconi studios, Boulogne, Paris, France; March 1975
- Genre: progressive rock
- Length: 44:30 (or 48:30)
- Label: EMI

Delired Cameleon Family is a progressive rock album by the group of the same name, released in 1975 on EMI Records in France. It features musicians associated with the Clearlight project, most notably its leader, pianist Cyrille Verdeaux, and Musica Elettronica Viva member Ivan Coaquette, who joined forces to compose the soundtrack for the film Visa de Censure No. X by French actor Pierre Clementi.

== Recording details ==
For the recording of the soundtrack in March 1975, Verdeaux and Coaquette each asked musician friends to join them at the Pathé Marconi studios in Boulogne, Paris. The results were released under the name Delired Cameleon Family by EMI Records who owned the film soundtrack rights. "Musique du film Visa de Censure No. X de Pierre Clementi" appears in small font at the top of the front cover, printed light blue on dark blue to reduce its prominence, and the film title is not mentioned at all on the label. The credits (in French) state: "produit par Pathé et Virgin" (Pathé Marconi was EMI's imprint name in France).

While the participation of a number of musicians associated with the Clearlight project, including several who went on to play on the "Forever Blowing Bubbles" album, the music is logically quite different from that of Clearlight - looser in production and less symphonic, evoking psychedelic and new-age music with a strong emphasis on rock and jazz fusion jamming. The album is mostly instrumental, but with a few vocal pieces: two in French and one in English. "Raganesh" is in the form of an Indian raga, while other songs include jazz elements.

The name Delired Cameleon Family was taken from a humorous "franglo" pun, "delire raide camé Léon". This being an English language name for a French project, it contains, perhaps unintentionally, two words that do not exist in the English language: delired as the adjective form of delirium ("delirious" would have been correct), and cameleon is a misspelling of the lizard species chameleon (probably confused with the French spelling, caméléon).

The controversial cover art shows a chameleon breaking out of a cube which could represent either a building or an LSD sugar cube, and foliage on the back cover composed of marijuana leaves. A whimsical attitude toward narcotics is also expressed in one of the song lyrics.

== Track listing ==
Timings printed on the label are quite different from what the cover says. Timings from the cover are shown first, followed by the label's timing in brackets (not shown in one instance where they are the same).

=== Side one ===
1. "Raganesh" (Cyrille Verdeaux) – 6:00 (6:50)
2. "Weird Ceremony" (Verdeaux) – 4:30
3. "La Fin du Début" (Verdeaux / Valérie Lagrange) – 4:00 (5:10)
4. "Le Boeuf" (Yvan Coaquette) – 7:30 (8:50)

"Le Boeuf" is credited to Yvan Coaquette on the cover, but to Cyrille Verdeaux on the label.

=== Side two ===
1. "Novavana" (Coaquette) – 7:30 (13:10)
2. "Anantà" (Coaquette) – 14:00 (10:00)

Side two appears to have three songs, banded separately with gaps of silence, and nothing musically to indicate which two pieces belong together. The label suggests the first two are one song, while the cover suggests the latter two go together.

== Personnel ==
- Cyrille Verdeaux – grand piano, organ, electric piano, harp, percussion, glockenspiel
- Yvan Coaquette – electric guitar, electric piano, shaneï guitar (sic; a shaneï or shehnai is a wind instrument)
- Christian Boulé – electric guitar, tortured and backtracked guitar
- J.-C. Agostini (Jean-Claude d'Agostini) – bass guitar, lead guitar
- François Jeanneau – soprano saxophone, ARP synthesizer
- Jean Padovani – drums, percussion
- Gilbert Artman – percussion, vibraphone
- Olivier Pamela – vocals
- Joël Dugrenot – vocals
- Tim Blake – tampoura, truckman (tampoura probably means tambura which Blake is known to have played on another album)
- Antoine Duvernet – electric alto (saxophone), big dry beans (sic)
- Ariel Kalman – tenor sax
- Aude Cornillac – transgalactic voice
- Valérie Lagrange – sings "Le Phœnix" (lyrics for "La Fin du Début")
