= Clearlight Symphony =

Studio album by Clearlight
- Released: 1975
- Recorded: Kaleidophon studio, UK; The Manor Studio, UK; 1973–1974
- Genre: Progressive rock
- Length: 40:47
- Label: Virgin
- Producer: Cyrille Verdeaux, Tim Blake, Simon Heyworth

Clearlight chronology
Clearlight Symphony (1975)	Forever Blowing Bubbles (1975)

Clearlight Symphony is a progressive rock album released in 1975 on Virgin Records in the UK. It is the first in a series of albums by a project led by pianist Cyrille Verdeaux with the participation of other musicians, including in this case three members of Gong on one side, and two other French musicians, Artman (of Lard Free and later Urban Sax) and Christian Boulé (formerly with Verdeaux in the band Babylone, and a later Steve Hillage sideman) on the other.

Primarily psychedelic, but also serving as a forerunner of new-age music, the album's musical style manages to blend seemingly contrary elements: the symphonic rock concept is flexible enough to permit extensive jamming in both rock and jazz fusion styles.

== Recording and release ==
The album was recorded for Virgin Records in 1973 and completed in 1974, after the label's first and highly successful release, Tubular Bells (1973) by Mike Oldfield, and was one of several subsequent Virgin albums that attempted to copy Tubular Bells' format of long pieces in a symphonic progressive rock style; in this case, exactly copying its structure of two pieces titled "part one" and "part two". Since the title Tubular Bells was initially better known to the general public than the name of its artist, Virgin Records decided that Clearlight Symphony would be a one-off album project with a title, but no artist name.

Recording was initiated with a session in which Cyrille Verdeaux, alone, played two 20 minute piano solos, which became the basic tracks for the entire album. In later recording sessions at David Vorhaus' Kaleidophon studio (side one) and the Manor (side two), Verdeaux and other musicians overdubbed more instruments onto the piano solo to create a complex arrangement.

The sides are not in the order Verdeaux intended. The side with Artman and Boulé was to have been side one, and prior to the album's release, an alternate mix of an excerpt was issued on the Virgin Records compilation album V (1975) as "Clearlight Symphony – extract from part 1". Sometime between the release of V and Clearlight Symphony Virgin Records decided that the side with Gong should become side one, partly to capitalise on Gong's growing reputation, and partly because it was closer in style to Tubular Bells with its symphonic structure (and like that album, contains no percussion in most sections), while the other side is closer to jamming rock music. In a later decade, Verdeaux obtained the rights to the album and re-issued it on CD with the parts in the intended order.

== Track listing ==
All tracks composed by Cyrille Verdeaux.

=== Side one ===
1. "Clearlight Symphony – part one" – 20:29

=== Side two ===
1. "Clearlight Symphony – part two" – 20:35

Side two ends in a solo organ cadence which runs into the play-out groove, and therefore plays on indefinitely until the tone-arm is lifted.

Original copies do not have the title printed on the front cover. Prior to a later edition with the title printed on the front, some copies were distributed with a transparent sticker attached to the front, stating the title. The position of the sticker varies from copy to copy.

== Personnel ==
- Cyrille Verdeaux – grand piano, organ, Mellotron (both sides), synthesized bass (side one), gong (side two)
- Tim Blake – synthesizer VCS3, percussions (side one)
- Steve Hillage – electric guitar (side one)
- Didier Malherbe – tenor sax (side one, but a saxophone is also heard on side two)
- Christian Boulé – electric guitar (side two)
- Gilbert Artman – drums, vibraphone, percussion C.N.D.P. (side two)
- Martin Isaacs – bass (side two)

side one produced by Cyrille Verdeaux and Tim Blake

side two produced by Cyrille Verdeaux and Simon Heyworth
