= Nemesis (electronic music band) =

- Origin: Kokkola, Finland
- Genres: Ambient; Electronica; Electronic music
- Years active: 1987–present
- Website: http://www.nettilinja.fi/~ahassine/

Nemesis is a Finnish music group formed in Kokkola in 1987 by Ami Hassinen and Jyrki Kastman. In 1994 they released their debut album Xcelsior, the first Finnish electronic/ambient album to be released internationally. In 1996 Nemesis was commissioned by Finnish national radio YLE to create the long-form work Evolution, and from then on followed a series of critically acclaimed albums, as well as live concerts.

In 2001 the band was expanded with a third member, Joni Virtanen.

The band's music is inspired by astronomy, science fiction, nature, childhood stories about UFOs and ghosts, and also other music artists like Kraftwerk, Can, Tangerine Dream, Neu!, AD2, Jean Michel Jarre, Jimi Hendrix, The Beatles, Hawkwind, Brian Eno, Robert Rich, Steve Roach, and others.

== Discography ==
This list is organized by release year. Titles are full-length CD albums unless otherwise mentioned.

Year	Title	Label	Comment
1994	Xcelsior	Barramundi	
1996	Cyberiad	Retroduction Records	
1999	Sky Archeology	Freeride	
2001	Music For Earports	Retroduction Records	
2002	Kaiku	Retroduction Records	Soundtrack album for photo portfolio by Jyrki Portin. Music by Nemesis and M. Portin
2005	Xtempora	Retroduction Records	
2006	Live Archive Vol. 1 1995 - 2001 (Audio Archeology)	Retroduction Records	CDR with live recordings
2007	Live Archive Vol. 2 1997 - 2004 (Stereofields Forever)	Retroduction Records	CDR with live recordings
2007	Live Archive Vol. 3 1997-2006 (Trajectory Of Sound)	Retroduction Records	CDR with live recordings
2010	Gigaherz	Origo Sound	
2010	1:4:9	Retroduction Records	Soundtrack album for sculpture project by Kimmo Heikkilä.
2012	Living Statues	Retroduction Records	theme album inspired by the life and work of Veijo Rönkkönen.
2014	Xenopus	Bandcamp	
2016	Nihilo Nihil (Soundtrack)	Bandcamp	Album dates from 1990, but was never released at the time.
2017	Decades 1	Bandcamp	
2017	Decades 2	Bandcamp	
2017	Decades 3	Bandcamp	

== See also ==
- Electronic music
- Progressive electronic music
- Electronic art music
- Ishkur's Guide to Electronic Music
- Ambient music
