= Mushroom (band) =

Musicians' collective based in the San Francisco Bay area

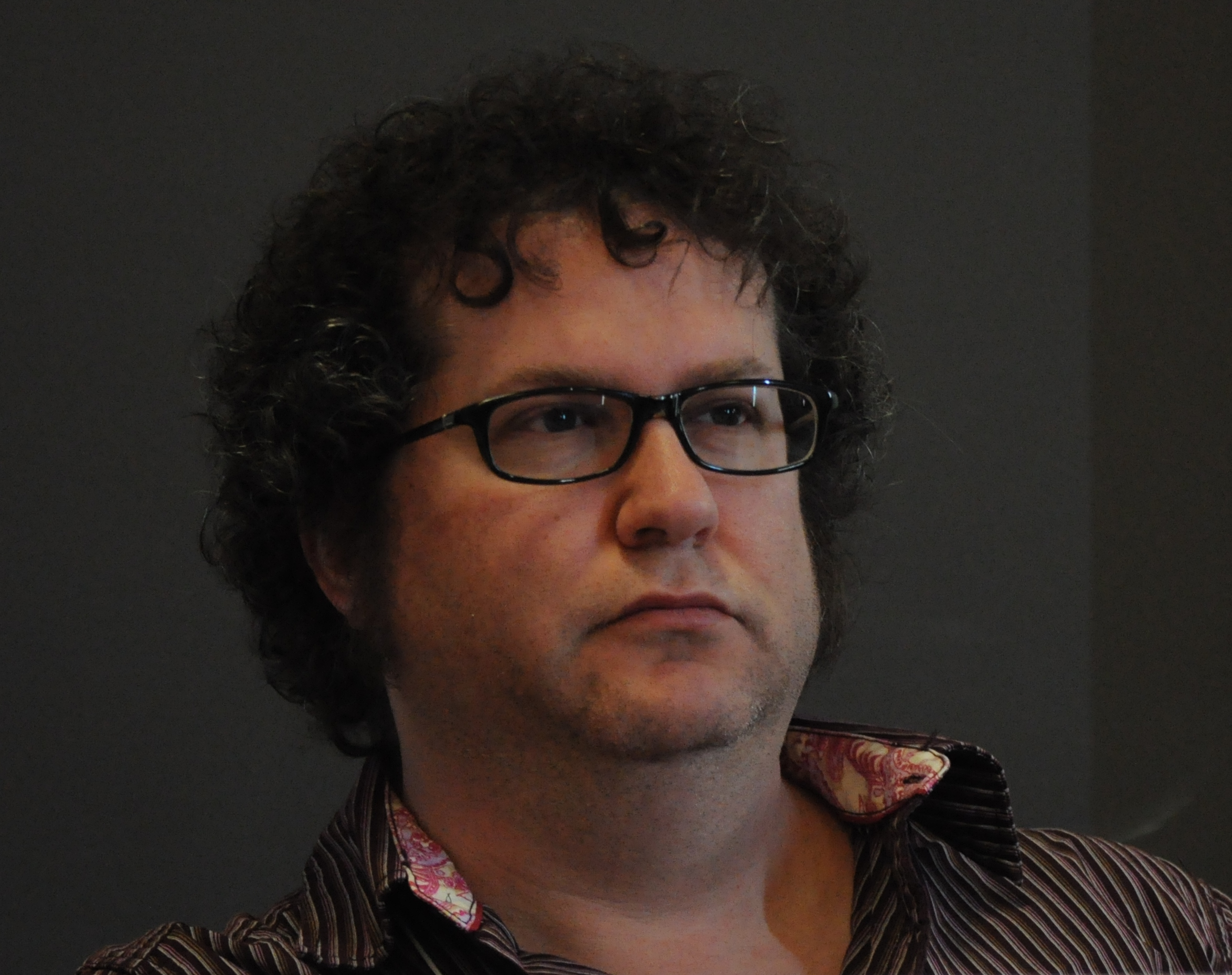
- Mushroom founder Pat Thomas, in 2011 at an academic pop music conference

Background information
- Origin: San Francisco, California, U.S.
- Genres: Jam band, alternative, experimental, psychedelic, folk rock
- Years active: 1996–
- Label: 4 Zero Records
- Members: Ned Doherty; Erik Pearson; Pat Thomas; Dave Brandt; Gram Connah; Dan Olmsted; Dave Mihaly; David Immerglück; Victor Krummenacher; Marc Weinstein
- Past members: Josh Pollock; Alison Faith Levy; Ralph Carney; Tim Plowman; Matt Cunitz; Kevin Ayers; Eddie Gale; Michael Holt; Alec Palao; Kurt Statham; Alex Candelaria; Carroll Ashby; Doug Pearson; Jeff Palmer; John Sanders; Jon Birdsong; Marc Capelle; Emery Dora; Brian Felix; Caroleen Beatty; Gary Floyd
- Website: mushroom3.bandcamp.com

Mushroom is a musicians' collective based in the San Francisco Bay Area. The group's sound has been described as a "diverse and eclectic blend of jazz, space rock, R&B, electronic, ambient, Krautrock and folk music".

== History ==
The group was founded in November 1996 by drummer Pat Thomas. Thomas is known for his work as a percussionist, record producer, music journalist and editor of Ptolemaic Terrascope. His credits as a producer of reissue recordings include albums by Aretha Franklin, Dusty Springfield, Television, and for Omnivore Recordings, artists such as Game Theory. Thomas is the author of the book Listen, Whitey: The Sights and Sounds of Black Power, a 2012 work of African-American cultural history centering on the Black Panther Party, with a concurrently released CD and double LP recording of speeches and protest songs.

Mushroom released its first recording in 1997, a 12" single called "The Reeperbahn," described by critic Fred Mills in Magnet as a recording that "could fool a blindfolded test applicant into thinking its 25-minute psych blowout was some long lost Krautrock epic from the early '70s. Let the band's wah-wah guitar, feedback violin, volcanic bass, jazzbo percussion, and tape loops take you down the fabled motorway, never to return to the place you once knew." "The Reeperbahn" provided the basis for CDs released in 1998 in Holland and Germany.

In 1999, the band released Analog Hi-Fi Surprise in the United States and Germany, followed by a European tour, by which time keyboard player Graham Connah had exited and was replaced by Michael Holt. Toronto music magazine Exclaim! wrote that the band "dish out the tastiest psychedelic funk you're ever likely to encounter. The groove's the thang as these tasty tracks cruise on Rhodes-driven jazz, ambient beats, surf riffs, and post rock textures. The band brew all these elements into a mixture that travels the outer realms of progressive funk. Like Tortoise jamming with the Grateful Dead or Soft Machine exploring the Funkadelic catalog, these loose open-ended excursions raise the art of fusion to a new plateau. While each track works a groove toward heady epiphany, the album as a whole refuses to stay locked into any one genre. Booker T-styled organ gyrations, rock guitar virtuosity, Bootsy Collins funk ups, ambient jazz, electronic beats, and Krautrock trance all make a stand, but the bottom line is that this is music that will move you, and then some."

The band then recorded Foxy Music (2001), which included trumpeter Jon Birdsong (known for his work with Beck). Q magazine in England wrote, "On the Foxy Music CD, the band steer away from determined psychedelia in favor of a friendly looseness to their playing. Jabs of electro-trombone and flute cluster alongside churning organ and splintered Rhodes Piano. Beck's trumpeter Jon Birdsong also turns on a great big blubbery blast of tuba, while musical director Patrick O'Hearn's clattering drums have an automaton rotary action that sometimes recalls Can's Jaki Liebezeit."

As of 2015, the members of Mushroom were Pat Thomas (congas, bongos, drum kit), Ned Doherty (bass), Erik Pearson (flute, violin, effects, acoustic and electric guitar, electric sitar), Dave Brandt (congas, bongos, vibes, djembe, gongs), Josh Pollock (acoustic guitar, vocals, megaphone electronics), Alison Levy (vocals), Ralph Carney (woodwinds/horns), Gram Connah (keyboards), Matt Cunitz (keyboards), Tim Plowman (guitar), Dan Olmsted (guitar), and Dave Mihaly (vibes, percussion).

Mushroom's current label is 4 Zero Records.

== Discography ==
=== Albums ===
- Cream of Mushroom (1998, Normal)
- Alive and in Full Bloom (1998, Inbetweens)
- Analog Hi-Fi Surprise (1999, Clearspot; 2002, Weed)
- Hydrogen Jukebox (1999, Timothy's Brain)
- Compared to What (2000, Weed) – with Bundy K. Brown, Faust, Gary Floyd
- Leni Riefenstahl (2000, Aether)
- Foxy Music (2001, InnerSPACE)
- Oh, But They're Weird and They're Wonderful (2002, Return to Sender)
- Mad Dogs & San Franciscans (2003, Black Beauty; 2012, A Records)
- Glazed Popems (2004, Black Beauty)
- Really Don't Mind If You Sit This One Out (2006, 4 Zero)
- Joint Happening (2007, Hyena)
- Yesterday, I Saw You Kissing Tiny Flowers (2007, 4 Zero) – with Alison Faith Levy
- Naked, Stoned & Stabbed (2010, 4 Zero)
- I Don't Remember Yesterday. Today It Rained (2011, 4 Zero)
- Songs of Dissent: Live at the Make Out Room 8/9/19 (2021, Alchemikal Artz)
- Messages from the Spliff Bunker (2024, Heyday Again)

=== Singles and EPs ===
- The Reeperbahn (12" single) (1997, Belmondo)
- Gas, Grass Or Ass - Nobody Rides For Free (CDr single) (2007, 4 Zero)
- Psychedelic Soul on Wax (EP) (2016, Little Mafia)
