= Rockbitch =

British band

- Rockbitch performing Breathe (video)

Background information
- Origin: United Kingdom
- Genres: Industrial rock; alternative rock; shock rock
- Years active: 1984 – at least 2004 (last cited live performance)
- Spinoffs: MT-TV
- Past members: Julie Worland; Lisa Wills ("Babe"); Amanda Smith-Skinner; Nikki Fay; Joanne Heeley; Tony Skinner ("the Beast"); "Luci"; "Chloe"; Suna Dasi ("Kali"); Martina ("Erzulie")
- Website: rockbitch.com/html/Home.html

Rockbitch were a British rock band, composed mostly of female, lesbian and bisexual members, who performed nude and incorporated sexual acts and Pagan rituals into their performances.

== History ==
Rockbitch was originally formed in 1984 as Cat Genetica by bassist Amanda Smith-Skinner ("the Bitch") and guitarist Tony Skinner ("the Beast"). The band was later renamed Red Abyss, in 1989, and drew band members from the matriarchal, polyamorous, pagan, feminist community of which Smith-Skinner was a member.

Rockbitch became infamous not only for performing live sex acts but also doing so with audience members via "The Golden Condom". During their shows, a condom was tossed into the crowd; whoever caught it (male or female) was taken backstage for sexual acts with band members. The band's official website describes all of the women band members as "lesbian or bisexual" and that there are "no exclusive monogamous couples" among its members. The band engaged in kissing, oral sex (male and female), and vaginal penetration via fingers, tongues, toys, and penises. They have stated on their website that they are tested every four months for sexually transmitted diseases and infections, including HIV and AIDS, and have rules around sexual contact. These rules include but are not limited to: only engaging in oral sex and penetration with a condom and not engaging in anal sex "outside the community". They've stated that no one in their community has caught any sexually transmitted disease.

The members of the band lived together as a polyamorous commune in a house in France.

In 1997, Rockbitch made tabloid headlines after they played at a school for pre-teen children, although for this particular concert they changed their name to "Rocky Beaches", wore modest clothes, and sang non-sexual songs.

Babe stated in 2002, "Rockbitch had no problem with lads out for seeing breasts, as they were a component of the audience, there were always others seeing the deeper meaning and both groups had a good time. They generally made up for a great combined atmosphere".

In 2003, the band received a Lifetime Achievement award from the Sexual Freedom Awards.

== Activism and philosophy ==
Members lent their voices to female and sexual issues, were winners of the yearly prize at the Sex Maniacs Ball (now Night of the Senses) founded by Tuppy Owens, openly voiced their admiration for sexual politics icons such as Annie Sprinkle and Betty Dodson, and generally advocated open female sexuality as a healthy part of human nature. In an extension of the 1970s' feminist statement that ‘the personal is the political’, they stated that no feminist movement was complete without female sexuality being re-examined, redefined and expressed in whatever shape it took by women themselves. They saw rock music as the perfect medium to do so, as it had been the arena for the expression of masculine sexuality for so long, whereas women's bodies were often a marketing spice to add interest to a product rather than a source of personal empowerment.

The group described themselves as having a free-love and pansexual communal philosophy. The band's lead guitarist, "Babe", stated in 2004 that, "we believe in liberating people through free and open sexuality".

== Dissolution ==
After the release of its first studio album, Motor Driven Bimbo, Rockbitch were increasingly pressured to censor their stage performances by their record company. They refused and successfully negotiated a release from their contract.

A second, goth-influenced album, titled Psychic Attack, was never released.

The band took care never to break any laws regarding the content of their stage shows in any country or territory. Continued attention from British police about their sexually-driven themes and performances combined with local council opposition to their adult-only shows. Underhanded pressure on venue owners regarding liquor and performance licences resulted in difficulties performing live, even when venue owners were positive towards the band. Tours were booked and then dates pulled with only days to spare. The frustration and problems this created led to Rockbitch ceasing to perform live for a time from 2002. The band would perform live again in August 2004.

Rockbitch were the subject of many documentaries and featured in many shows. Amongst others, Rockbitch were the subject of a 30-minute documentary on BBC Choice the same year. A further, hour-long documentary was broadcast on Channel 5 in the UK in 2003. Award-winning director Norman Hull made This is Rockbitch in 2003. They can still be spotted in repeats of Sexcetera.

In 2005, the entire latter-day Rockbitch lineup emerged under the name MT-TV. This was a music-only project, with none of the sex or nudity of the Rockbitch days, but it incorporated stage theatrics and provided sociosexual-based political comment through its lyrics. After a UK tour in summer 2005, they performed throughout the United States. The first part of their US tour was documented on the DVD Shevolution, released by Blackwing Films in 2006.

The most recent program, released in 2017, is a Swedish documentary on the rise in popularity of witchcraft and its feminist connections. The first film crew to be allowed access behind the commune walls since the cessation of the Rockbitch live performances, the documentary contains a recap of their musical career, and provides insight into their pagan/witchcraft roots with how it underpinned their music and interviews with Babe.

Amanda and Jo subsequently went on to form the band Syren with singer/songwriter Erin Bennett, who joined the Rockbitch commune in 2006. In 2012, Jo died of breast cancer. Amanda gave up her musical career shortly after. Erin Bennett subsequently continued as a solo artist with a backing band that contains some ex-members of Rockbitch, discarding the name Syren and performing as Erin Bennett and the EB Band. In the last two years, the band have undergone a complete rebranding and are now touring as a prog rock band under the name EBB.

Julie, the lead singer of Rockbitch, continues her musical career under the name Krow, creating hard dance music in the style of Noise Terror Punk EDM. Her music and video were also featured in the Swedish documentary.

== Personnel ==
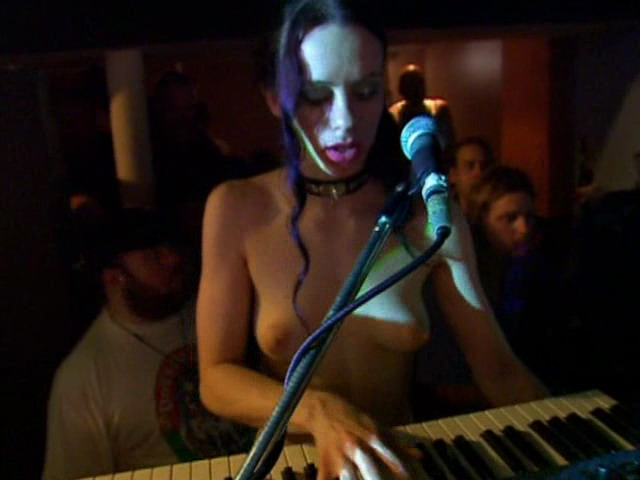
Nikki Fay

The personnel were as follows:

- Julie Worland: Vocals
- "Luci": Guitar (from 2000, previously dancer and sex performer)
- Amanda Smith-Skinner ("the Bitch"): bass
- Nikki Fay: piano, flute
- Joanne Heeley (2 November 1972 – 11 January 2012): drums
- Lisa Wills ("Babe"): lead guitar, backing vocals (also webmistress)
- Tony Skinner ("the Beast"): guitar on Motor Driven Bimbo and producer of both studio albums
- "Chloe": dancer, sex performer
- Suna Dasi ("Kali"): dancer, sex performer
- Martina ("Erzulie"): dancer, sex performer

== Discography and videography ==
- Luci's Love Child (as Red Abyss) (1992) (Eurock)
- Rockbitch Live In Amsterdam (1997) (Crystal Rock Syndicate – doCD)
- Bitchcraft (concert and documentary video, 1997, subsequently released on DVD) not available in countries like USA, Japan
- The Bitch O'Clock News (reports and clips video, 1998) made for audiences in USA and Japan
- Motor Driven Bimbo (1999) (Steamhammer)
- Psychic Attack (unreleased) (2002)
- Sex, Death and Magick (concert/documentary video, 2002)
- This is Rockbitch (documentary video, 2003)
