= Thee Majesty =

British industrial music group

Thee Majesty were a British industrial music group.

== History ==
In 1998, Genesis P-Orridge was ending their association with the name Psychic TV, the band they created after the termination of Throbbing Gristle. At the same time, they began conceptualizing Thee Majesty as a spoken word-based project springing from the Splinter Test project with PTV alumnus Larry Thrasher. The first major Thee Majesty performance was in 1998 in Stockholm, Sweden at an international spoken word festival that included Michael Gira and Wanda Coleman amongst other notable spoken word artists. That first Thee Majesty lineup for the Sweden show included P-Orridge, Larry Thrasher, Bachir Attar and Chandra Shukla. Later in New York, P-Orridge met Bryin Dall (4th Sign of the Apocalypse, A Murder of Angels, Dream Into Dust) and began doing live performances in New York and San Francisco and tours with the industrial band Pigface. Thee Majesty's second major performance was at the Royal Festival Hall in London on 1 May 1999, which was also the "final" show of PTV. The show was called "Time's Up" which was also the name of the new project's debut CD, released on the same date by Dall's label The Order of the Suffering Clown via World Serpent Distribution. Since then, Thee Majesty has remained an intermittent project, only playing sporadic festivals, art events, and intimate venues in Europe and the US, and releasing very few original studio albums. In 2009 Thee Majesty played a show expounding on a transgender creation story theme at the Centre Pompidou with P-Orridge, Thrasher, Dall and Edley in the lineup.

== Members ==
Besides P-Orridge and Dall, Larry Thrasher has performed several live shows including two tours of Europe. They were joined in 2004 by P-Orridge's wife, Lady Jaye Breyer P-Orridge, and briefly by Morrison Edley (Toilet Böys). The project remains a vehicle for P-Orridge's semi-freeform rants and concepts, supported by Dall's guitar and sample soundscapes along with Thrasher's tabla playing and noise soundscapes, at times augmented by some combination of other players. Edley, now known as "Electric Eddie", has focused mainly on PTVII, the latest incarnation of Psychic TV. Lady Jaye died on Tuesday 9 October 2007.

== Discography ==
Thee Majesty's discography is a bit confusing. As noted above, Time's Up was the name of multiple releases and events including the debut album. P-Orridge has also opted to use the name on reissues of works predating the band's inception. A Hollow Cost, At Stockholm, and Thee Fractured Garden were originally Psychic TV or Splinter Test releases, but in reissues they were given new artwork and credited to both Genesis P-Orridge and Thee Majesty. Mary Never Wanted Jesus was a special Christmas-themed limited release that contains some different tracks and running orders on the vinyl and CD versions. Vitruvian Pan is the band's second proper full-length studio album, though it contains elements from live recordings.

Note: releases marked with ^{‡} are dual-credited reissues of older material.

- Time's Up (1999)
- Time's Up Live (2001)
- A Hollow Cost (2003)^{‡}
- At Stockholm (2004)^{‡}
- Thee Fractured Garden] (2004)^{‡}
- Mary Never Wanted Jesus (2005)
- Vitruvian Pan (2007)

== See also ==
- Psychic TV
- Splinter Test
- Throbbing Gristle
