= Siegfried Creek =

Stream in Clearwater County, Minnesota, U.S.

Coordinates: 47°11′29″N 95°13′35″W

Siegfried Creek is a stream in Clearwater County, Minnesota, in the United States.

Siegfried Creek was named for A. H. Siegfried, a newspaper agent from Louisville, Kentucky, who made a vacation to some lakes in the area in 1879.

== See also ==
- List of rivers of Minnesota
