= Freq (album) =

Studio album by Robert Calvert
- Released: January 1985
- Recorded: August 1984
- Studio: Computer Music Studio, London
- Genre: Electronic music, Minimalist music
- Label: Flicknife Records
- Producer: Robert Calvert

Robert Calvert chronology
Hype (1981)	Freq (1985)	Test-Tube Conceived (1986)

Professional ratings
Review scores
Source	Rating
AllMusic	3/5 stars

Freq is a 1985 album by English singer and musician Robert Calvert. It was recorded during the time of the 1984–1985 UK miners' strike and in between the songs it features snippets of field recordings by Calvert with miners on a picket line, with Calvert displaying his sympathy for their cause.

The lyrics cover various themes, only "All the Machines are Quiet" and "Picket Line" being explicitly concerned with the miners' strike. "Ned Ludd" is a reworking of a track which was originally part of his stage play The Kid from Silicon Gulch; taking its name from Ned Ludd who inspired the luddite movement in 1811, it deals with Calvert's ambivalent attitude to the impact of new technologies on people's lives.

The music saw a movement away from his previous work as a frontman of a rock group towards a minimalist electronic sound.

The tracks "Lord of the Hornets" and "The Greenfly and the Rose" were recorded as demos in preparation for Calvert's Hype album, but they were issued as a single by Flicknife Records (FLS204) in 1980. The band used for this session is a unique combination of former Hawkwind members, except for Gary Cooper who was Calvert's literary agent at the time.

== Track listing ==
All titles written by Robert Calvert.

=== Side 1 ===
1. "Ned Ludd" – 4:57
2. (talk) – 1:31
3. "Acid Rain" – 5:06
4. (talk) – 2:37
5. "All The Machines Are Quiet" – 5:33

=== Side 2 ===
1. (talk) – 1:12
2. "Picket Line" – 3:27
3. (talk) – 1:06
4. "The Cool Courage of the Bomb Squad Officers" – 5:21
5. (talk) – 1:06
6. "Work Song" – 3:54

=== Bonus tracks ===
1. "Lord of the Hornets" – 3:52
2. "The Greenfly and the Rose" – 3:39

== Personnel ==
=== Original album ===
- Robert Calvert – 5-string guitar, treated harmonica, percussion, keyboards, drums, electronic Simmons drums, vocals
- Jill Riches – keyboards, vocals
- Philip G. Martin – guitars
- Ray Davis – programming

=== Bonus tracks ===
- Robert Calvert – vocals
- Huw Lloyd-Langton – guitar
- Steve Swindells – keyboards
- Gary Cooper – bass on "The Greenfly and the Rose"
- Lemmy – bass on "Lord of the Hornets"
- Simon King – drums

== Credits ==
- Recorded: August 1984, Computer Music Studio, London
- Matt Green: Remix on Cleopatra version.

== Release history ==
- January 1985: UK, Flicknife Records (SHARP 021), vinyl
- June 1992: UK, Anagram Records (CDMGRAM55), CD with bonus tracks
- June 1994: US, Cleopatra Records (CLEO 9467-2), CD with bonus tracks
