= Clearlight (French band) =

French progressive rock band

- Origin: France
- Genres: Progressive rock
- Years active: 1973–
- Labels: Virgin, Isadora, Celluloid
- Past members: Cyrille Verdeaux (among others)

Clearlight is a French progressive rock band formed in 1973, although their best known work was produced in England and released by a major British record company. While progressive rock is an appropriate overall genre for the band, much of their work delves into other genres including psychedelic music, jam band music, symphonic rock, space rock, jazz fusion, and new-age music.

"Clearlight" consists of pianist and composer Cyrille Verdeaux alongside other musicians, who are usually guest participants with no compositional input, except on a couple of occasions, like the second album Forever Blowing Bubbles, where bassist Joël Dugrenot had virtual co-leader status, composing two of the tracks, or Visions, which prominently featured Didier Malherbe (formerly of Gong) and Didier Lockwood (formerly of Magma and Zao) as soloists.

== History ==
In the mid to late 1970s the band was managed by Jacques Reland, now a lecturer at the London Metropolitan University and Head of European Research at the Global Policy Institute. The Rennes-born manager negotiated the band's first four album deals.

Clearlight has rarely performed live. In 1975, Virgin sent a variation of the Forever Blowing Bubbles band on the road supporting Gong, but it broke up soon afterwards following Verdeaux's decision not to relocate to England as Virgin insisted he did - which ended his relationship with the label.

In April 1978, a new version of the band was unveiled at the Olympia in Paris, a performance intended to be followed by a proper tour to promote Visions, but lack of interest from promoters dictated otherwise.

In the 1980s, the name was largely retired as Verdeaux concentrated on albums released under his own name, although there was another one-off performance at an electronic music festival in 1988 featuring Verdeaux and regular collaborators Christian Boulé and Tim Blake.

In the 1990s, Verdeaux began recording under the Clearlight name again.

His latest release, 2014's Impressionist Symphony, again features all three Gong members who had appeared on Clearlight Symphony.

Verdeaux and Don Falcone have collaborated in Spirits Burning (under the name Spirits Burning & Clearlight). Their 2012 release was titled Healthy Music In Large Doses and their 2016 release was titled The Roadmap In Your Head.

== Discography ==
- Clearlight Symphony – 1975, Virgin Records V-2029, UK; this album has no artist name
- Forever Blowing Bubbles – 1975, Virgin Records V-2039, UK
- Les Contes du Singe Fou – 1976, Isadora Records ISA-9009, France
- Visions – 1978, Celluloid / LTM Records LTM-1005, France; says LTM Records on cover, Celluloid Records on label
- Symphony 2 – 1990, Mantra; an expanded 66-minute six movement redux of the 1975 composition
- In Your Hands – 1994, Legend Music
- Infinite Symphony – 2003, Clearlight Music
- Impressionist Symphony – 2014, Gonzo Multimedia
