= Syren (band) =

American alternative rock band

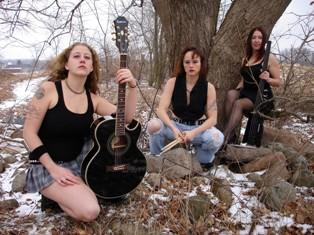
- Syren in 2006 in Detroit, Michigan

Background information
- Origin: United Kingdom, United States
- Genres: Folk rock
- Years active: 2006–2014
- Past members: Erin Bennett; Joanne Heeley; Amanda Smith-Skinner

Syren were an alternative rock trio formed in the United States by singer-songwriter Erin Bennett and ex-Rockbitch rhythm section Amanda Smith-Skinner (bass) and Jo Heeley (drums). The band's debut album, Dehumanized, was followed by successful US, UK and European tours and gained much praise in the music press. A second, unreleased, album, Something Has To Separate, was shelved due to Heeley's death in 2012 and the subsequent retirement of Smith-Skinner soon after. Bennett reformed the band with an all-new line-up for a handful of one-off shows supporting space rock band Hawkwind and performed a final 'farewell' show as Syren on January 16, 2014. She continues to create music as Erin Bennett & the EB band, and was awarded a Scottish New Music award in 2012.

== Members ==
=== Original members ===
Erin Bennett (Acoustic and Electric Guitars, Lead Vocals, Songwriter)
Amanda Smith-Skinner (Fretless Bass, Electric Upright)
Jo Heeley (Drums, Percussion, Backing Vocals) (2 November 1972 - 11 January 2012)

=== 2013–2014 touring members ===
Erin Bennett (Acoustic and Electric Guitars, Lead Vocals, Songwriter)
Dog (Bass)
Suna Dasi (Backing Vocals and Spoken Word)
Nikki Fay (Keyboards)
Anna Fraser (Drums)

=== 2014–present (as EBB) ===
==== Additional member ====
Kitty Biscuits (Backing Vocals and Spoken Word)

== Formation and Dehumanized album ==
Syren was formed in 2006 by singer/songwriter Erin Bennett and British rhythm duo Amanda Smith-Skinner and Jo Heeley. In their first two years, the band played more than 200 shows across the United States, mainly in the states of Michigan, Ohio, Alabama, Florida and Georgia. Syren's rising popularity in the US underground music scene and the demand for copies of their singles, "Dehumanized" and "Seasons", led them to record their debut album, also called Dehumanized, at Song Garden Studios in Detroit, Michigan. It was here that the trio had the opportunity to sit in as session players for various artists from around the world including Mike Quatro, brother of renowned bass player/singer, Suzi. After the completion of the album, Syren were quickly booked up and toured across the mid-west and southern US to promote its release.

== UK and European tour ==
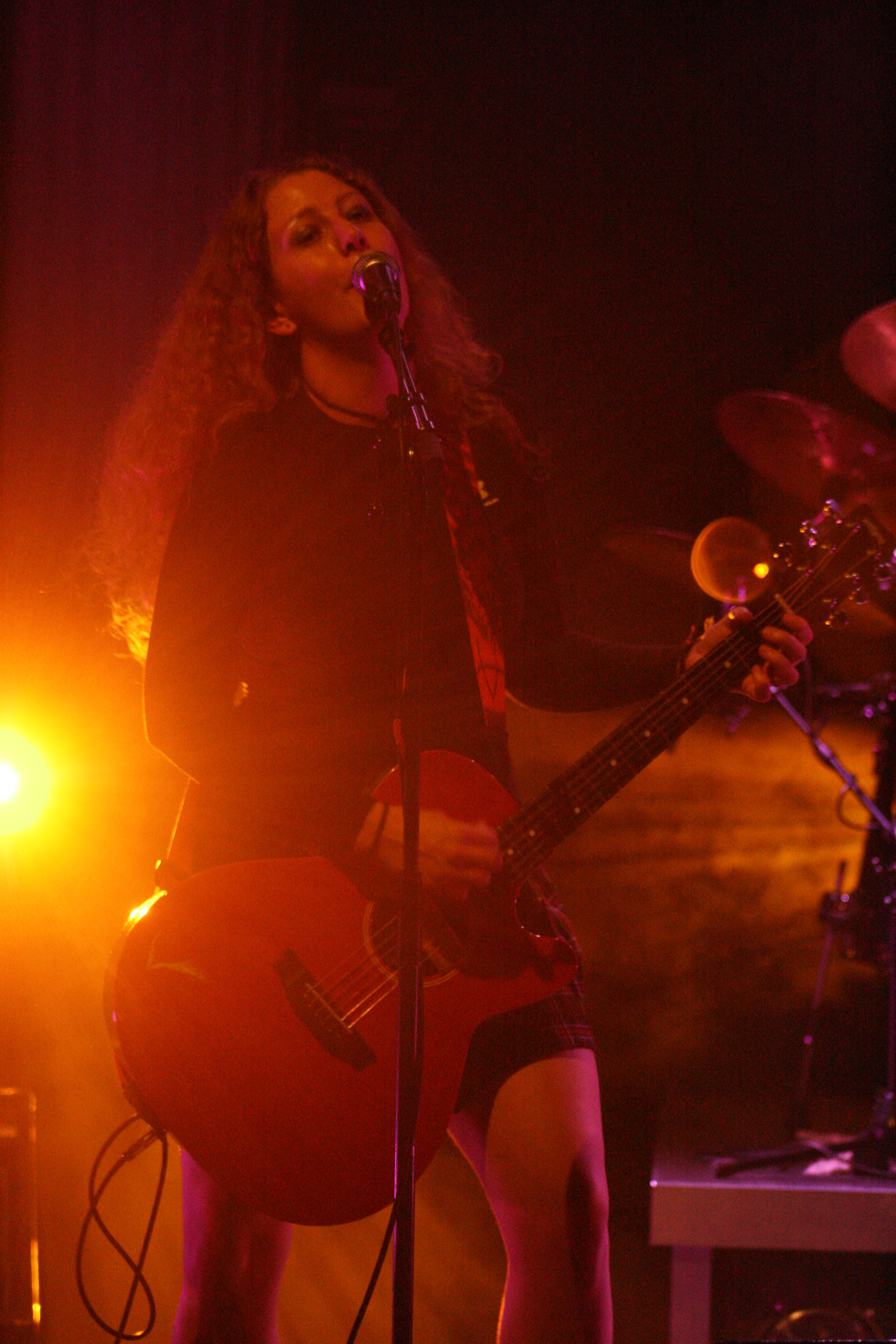
Erin Bennett live in Dordrecht, The Netherlands

After performing throughout the US to promote their debut album, Syren were offered a tour by various agents in the UK, However, it was their many performances booked for the Netherlands which swayed the decision to 'pack up and move' to England.

In May 2008, Syren played their last US dates and moved to the UK, where they based themselves for a year. During the remainder of 2008 and early 2009, Syren played countless venues around the UK including Nottingham Rock City and Manchester Academy, supporting space rock band Hawkwind.

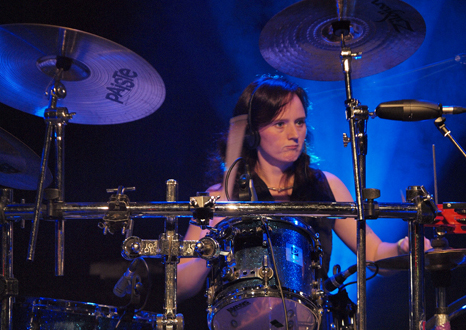
Jo of Syren plays at Bibelot, Dordrecht

The band's first tour of the Netherlands came in the summer of 2008, when they played at least 13 shows across the country. Syren received //much press throughout the Netherlands all of which praised the group saying, 'The balance between these three and the grand ensemble that results from it, and again interspersed with the right dose of spontaneity, provides an extraordinary musical spectacle that keeps surprising.'-RTV Rijnmond

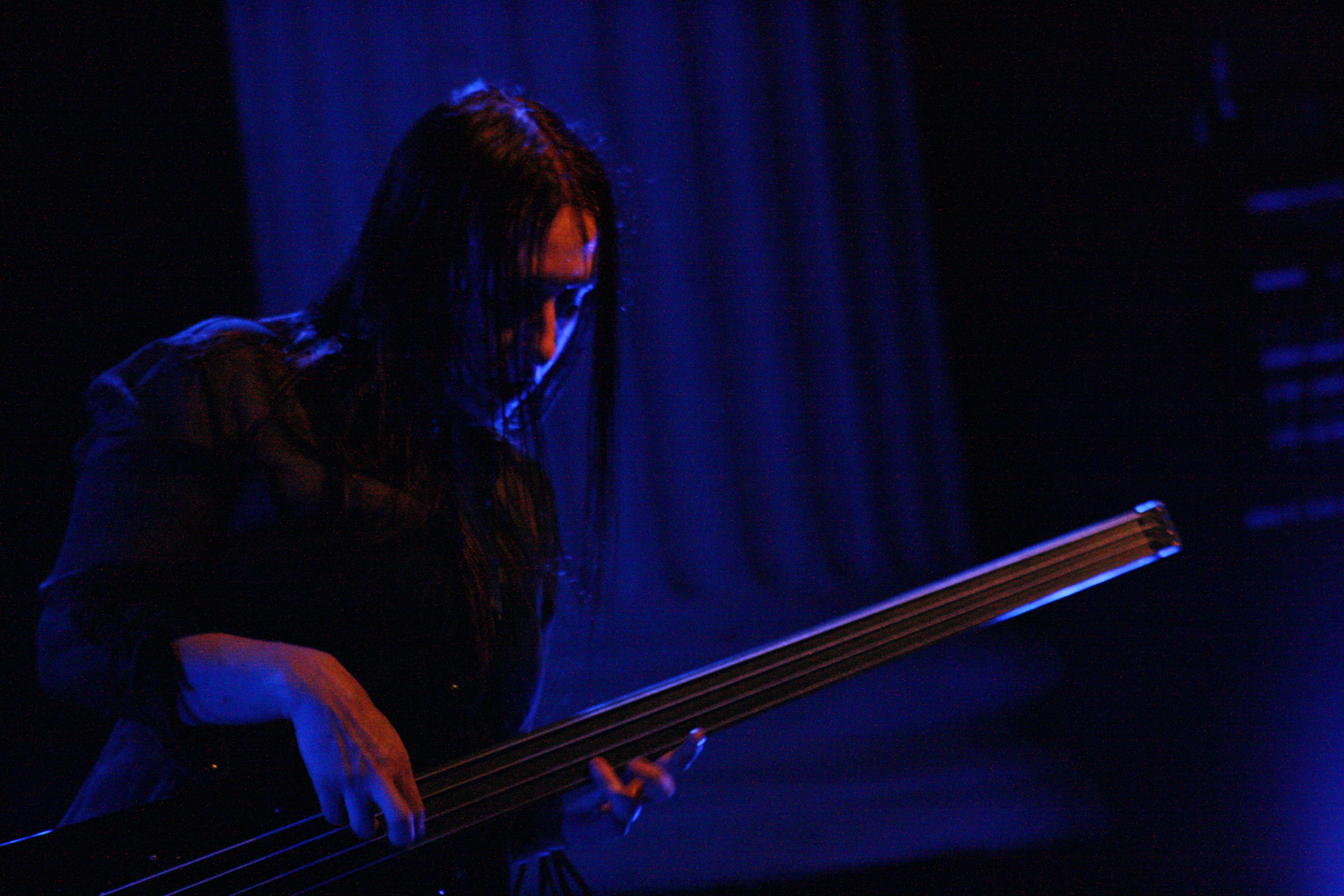
Amanda plays live in Dordrecht, The Netherlands

Throughout 2009 the band played hundreds of shows in all regions of the Netherlands, supporting some big Dutch and American acts (The Madd, Tony Spinner) and playing large venues such as Dordrecht's Bibelot, Acedemica Big River's Festival '09, Waerdse Tempel and the Noordzee Zomer Festival in Katwijk aan Zee. Syren were described by RTV Rijnmond's Ronald Van Oudheusden as being '3 Hard Rock Chickies' after their performance on Live Uit Lloyd and were featured in a three-page article in the Netherlands' Gitaar Plus Magazine. With Syren's growing popularity and attention in the press by 2010 Syren had relocated to The Netherlands where they based themselves and reached out to nearby territories such as Germany and Belgium.

== Second studio album, Something Has To Separate ==
After moving to The Netherlands in 2010, Syren set to work on their second studio album at Nemesis Studios in Den Helder. The new album, titled Something Has To Separate included 10 original songs written and produced by Syren and took listeners on a journey through the pendulous emotions of love unrequited.

The title track, "Something Has To Separate" is one of many songs on the album featuring a new electric guitar sound by Bennett which takes Syren in a new direction from their debut album which featured only acoustic guitars.

After all of the instruments had been recorded and the tracks produced by Jo and Erin, Syren once again relocated back to the UK, where they set up 'Sapphic Studios' in Scotland. There Erin laid down the album's vocals takes and recorded and arranged the strings played by Australian singer/songwriter and cellist Rebecca Wright for the song "Special".

By August 2011, the album was being mixed by Erin and 'The Beast' at Bitch Studios, Scotland.

== Cancer diagnosis and death of drummer Joanne Heeley ==
In August 2011, Heeley was diagnosed with metastatic inflammatory breast cancer and received treatment from doctors at the Beatson Oncology Centre in Glasgow. As Jo's partner, Erin put mixing Syren's Something Has To Separate album on hold in order to support Jo. On January 11, 2012, Joanne Heeley died.

In April 2012, Erin released a solo track entitled, "Never Give Up The Fight", which was recorded, produced and mixed by her at Sapphic Studios and features cello by Rebecca Wright. The track was released for download only on April 11, 2012. All of the proceeds from downloads were donated to breast cancer care. "Never Give Up The Fight" went on to secure Erin a nomination in the Scottish New Music Awards for 'Songwriter of the Year,' an award which Erin won on September 2 at the awards ceremony in Glasgow.

After her bandmate's death, Smith-Skinner decided not to continue with Syren, feeling that her contribution to music had been made. Erin's dedication to Syren's friends and fans made her reform the band with new musicians. The new line-up debuted on June 2, 2012 live at Queen's Hall, Edinburgh once again supporting Hawkwind. After another show supporting Hawkwind on March 30, 2013, and a handful of small Edinburgh shows, Erin said 'goodbye' to Syren in a farewell show at Henry's Cellar Bar in Edinburgh on January 16, 2014.

Erin continues to record and tour under her own name. Erin Bennett & The EB band and released a new album Post Sexy Post Truth, on 10 February 2018.

== Awards ==
'Frankie Miller Songwriter of the Year 2012' - Scottish New Music Awards : (Nominated for "Never Give Up The Fight")
