= Test-Tube Conceived =

Studio album by Robert Calvert
- Released: April 1986
- Recorded: 1986
- Studio: Foel Studios, Powys, Wales
- Genre: Electronic
- Label: Demi Monde Records
- Producer: Robert Calvert

Robert Calvert chronology
Freq (1985)	Test-Tube Conceived (1986)	At the Queen Elizabeth Hall (1989)

Professional ratings
Review scores
Source	Rating
AllMusic	3.5/5 stars

Test-Tube Conceived is a 5th and final album by English singer and musician Robert Calvert. The album has been released in April 1986.

== Track listing ==
All titles written by Robert Calvert.

=== Side one ===
1. "Invitro Breed" - 4:24
2. "The Rah Rah Man" - 3:27
3. "Telekinesis" - 3:17
4. "I Hear Voices" - 5:39
5. "Fanfare for the Perfect Race" - 3:53

=== Side two ===
1. "On Line" - 4:20
2. "Save Them From the Scientists" - 3:36
3. "Fly on the Wall" - 3:58
4. "Thanks to the Scientists" - 5:23
5. "Test-Tube Conceived" - 4:22

=== Bonus track ===
1. "Test-Tube Conceived" (live, November 3, 1986)

== Personnel ==
- Bob Calvert – vocals, synthesizer, drum programming, percussion, guitar
- Dave Anderson – bass
- Martin Holdcroft – guitars, drum programming, keyboards, tape loops
- Julie Wareing – backing vocals
- Brian Snelling – additional keyboards, engineer

== Release history ==
- April 1986: UK, Demi Monde (DMLP1010), vinyl
- August 1987: UK, The CD label (CDTL007), CD
- 1996: UK, Thunderbolt (CDTB113), CD
- August 2003: UK, Voiceprint Records (VP273CD), CD with bonus track
