= Karl E. H. Seigfried =

German–American musician, composer, bandleader, writer and educator

- Origin: Evanston, Illinois, US
- Genres: Jazz, rock, classical music
- Occupations: Bassist, guitarist, tubist, composer, bandleader, author, educator
- Instruments: Double bass, electric bass, acoustic guitar, electric guitar, lap steel guitar, tuba
- Years active: 1993–present
- Label: Imaginary Chicago
- Website: seigfried.org norsemyth.org

Karl E. H. Seigfried is a German–American jazz, rock, and classical bassist, guitarist, composer, bandleader, writer and educator based in Chicago.

Seigfried has performed and taught on the double bass "in virtually all musical styles – from classical to avant garde jazz." His projects in Chicago and his wide-ranging collaborations have largely been centered on an effort to promote multiculturalism in music. Critics have compared his double bass approach to those of Malachi Favors, Henry Grimes, Charlie Haden, Charles Mingus, and Sirone.

Outside of his work in music, Seigfried writes and teaches as a Norse mythologist. He is also a gothi.

== Performing ==
In his role as jazz bassist, Seigfried is one of the innovative Chicago jazz musicians who have come to public attention since the early 1990s; this new generation (including David Boykin, Jeff Parker, and Jim Baker) "embraces a wide variety of styles and techniques." Seigfried has performed with a broad range of modern jazz performers, including Robert Barry, Anthony Davis, Jimmy Ellis, Henry Grimes, Peter Kowald, and Bobby McFerrin. Although not a member of the Association for the Advancement of Creative Musicians, Seigfried has performed with members from all generations of the Chicago organization, including Fred Anderson, Gerald Donovan / Ajaramu, David Boykin, Ernest Dawkins, Fred Hopkins, Aaron Getsug, George Lewis, Nicole Mitchell, Roscoe Mitchell, Jeff Parker, Avreeayl Ra, and Isaiah Spencer. He has also played double bass with several notable big bands, including the Glenn Miller Orchestra, the Dick Jurgens Orchestra, and the AACM Great Black Music Ensemble. In 2008, he performed a duet for jazz bass and live drawing with British comic book artist Boo Cook for the Third Annual Chicago Calling Arts Festival in Chicago. He currently leads the New Quartet and the Seigfried Trio.

In the classical world, Seigfried is member of the Chicago Sinfonietta and performed with them for collaborations with Poi Dog Pondering and Muddy Waters guitarist John Primer. He is Principal Bassist of the Chicago Sinfonietta Chamber Ensemble and has been featured in their collaborations with Adler Planetarium & Astronomy Museum, Shedd Aquarium, and Joffrey Ballet. As Principal Bassist of the Peoria Symphony Orchestra, he has led the bass section behind soloists Emanuel Ax, Joshua Bell, Evelyn Glennie, Hilary Hahn, Sharon Isbin, Yo-Yo Ma, Mark O'Connor, and Itzhak Perlman. He is also Principal Bassist of the Heartland Festival Orchestra and has recorded and performed as the Principal Bassist of the New Black Music Repertory Ensemble. A member of the Rockford Symphony Orchestra, he often plays principal, jazz, and electric bass for the group. He played bass for the Chicago premieres of both the Lord of the Rings Symphony and the Music of Final Fantasy.

In rock, Seigfried plays lead guitar for the Soul Power Trio and bass and guitar for the alternative country band the Lost Cartographers. He is a member of the space rock supergroup Spirits Burning, which features members of Hawkwind, Blue Öyster Cult, Citizen Fish, Gong, Jefferson Starship, Psychic TV, Soft Machine, The Tubes, and Van der Graaf Generator; their psychedelic cover of "Ace of Spades" (featuring Seigfried on upright bass with Hawkwind vocalist Bridget Wishart) was included on the 2008 Motörhead tribute album, Sheep in Wolves' Clothing.

== Recording ==
Seigfried's recordings include the trio albums, Boykin, Seigfried, & Reed and Portrait of Jack Johnson; the album of solo bass, Criminal Mastermind; and the work for mixed quartet, Blue Rhizome; all of which feature his original compositions. The first trio recording (with saxophonist David Boykin and drummer Mike Reed) has been described as "the true definition of the Chicago avant-garde. Their music sometimes floats calmly like a river and sometimes swings with great violence." The solo recording demonstrates that Seigfried's "musical influences, as heard in his playing, are many and varied: the listener will detect styles such as jazz, classical, old guitar-based rural blues (think Robert Johnson), perhaps even traditional Japanese music." Of the quartet recording, "ein grosses Thema des Albums auch in musikalischer Hinsicht ist das Überschreiten von Grenzen und das Hinterfragen der eigenen Werturteile" ("a large theme of the album, also in a musical respect, is the transcending of borders and the questioning of our own value judgements"). Portrait of Jack Johnson features "The Boxing Bassist Suite," which includes musical portraits of three twentieth-century boxing champions who were also jazz bassists: Jack Johnson, Archie Moore, and Ezzard Charles; the album cover was painted by British comic book artist Boo Cook and designed by American comic book graphic company Comicraft. It was named a Top 10 Album of 2010 by the editor of Jazziz Magazine, received four stars from Down Beat Magazine and was named "Editor's Recommended New Release" by the New York City Jazz Record.

== Writing and teaching: music and mythology ==
Seigfried holds a doctorate in Double Bass Performance, and his treatise on Wilbur Ware is the only scholarly work on the African-American Chicago bassist. His teachers included Jimmy Cheatham, Richard Davis, Carol Kaye, and Bertram Turetzky. Seigfried is currently working with Bertram Turetzky on the pioneering double bassist's autobiography. Seigfried is Bass & Guitar Faculty at Carthage College and Music Faculty at Loyola University Chicago's School of Continuing and Professional Studies. He previously held music faculty positions at Knox College, Rock Valley College, and Western Illinois University.

Seigfried holds a degree in Literature (American, English, and German) from University of California, San Diego, studied Art and Literature at Loyola University Chicago's John Felice Rome Center, and has spent time researching Norse mythology and religion in Iceland. He is Norse Religion Faculty at Carthage College, where he teaches in the Religion Department. He has taught Norse mythology at Loyola University Chicago's School of Continuing and Professional Studies and at the Newberry Library. He maintains "The Norse Mythology Blog", which was a finalist for "Best Weblog About Religion" in the 2011 Weblog Awards. In 2010, Seigfried presented a paper titled "Wagner & Wotan: The Ring Cycle & Norse Mythology" at the Wagner Society of America, and his essay "Stephen Hawking: The Myths and the Critics" was featured at the Joseph Campbell Foundation. He is a member of the Society for the Advancement of Scandinavian Study, the Viking Society for Northern Research, and the Religion Newswriters Association.

He is a gothi of Thor's Oak Kindred, an Ásatrú organization in Chicago, and a member of the Troth Clergy Program.

Seigfried is also a long-time writer on boxing for East Side Boxing.

== Discography ==
As leader:

- Boykin, Seigfried, & Reed (2004, Imaginary Chicago)
- Criminal Mastermind (2006, Imaginary Chicago)
- The New Quartet: Blue Rhizome (2008, Imaginary Chicago)
- Portrait of Jack Johnson (2010, Imaginary Chicago)

As a sideman:

- E.C.F.A. (with Peter Kowald) (2000, Pull the String)
- Detritus (with Horses and Corpses) (2003, Betasound)
- A Madison Christmas (with Madison Symphony Orchestra) (2004, ION)
- Live at the Spareroom (with Microcosmic Sound Orchestra) (2005, SHM)
- Sheep in Wolves' Clothing (with Motörhead / Spirits Burning) (2008, MHB)
- Walk On (with The Lost Cartographers) (2009, Imaginary Chicago)
- Bloodlines (with Spirits Burning) (2009, Voiceprint)
- Recorded Music of the African Diaspora: Mary Watkins & Olly Wilson (with New Black Music Repertory Ensemble) (2010, Albany)
- This Burning Ship of Fools (with Matthew Santos) (2009, Love Sick Fool)
- Crazy Fluid (with Spirits Burning) (2010, Voiceprint)
- Behold the Action Man (with Spirits Burning) (2011, Gonzo)
- Recorded Music of the African Diaspora: Florence B. Price (with New Black Music Repertory Ensemble) (2011, Albany)
