= ST 37 =

- Origin: Austin, Texas, United States
- Genres: Psychedelic rock, space rock
- Years active: 1987–present
- Members: S.L. Telles; Joel Crutcher; Lisa Cameron; Bobby Baker; Matthew Turner
- Past members: Mark Stone; Carlton Crutcher; Cisco Ryder G. Craig Johnson; Shane Shelton; Lance Farley; Jon Torn; John Foxworth; Chris Cones
- Website: st37.com

ST 37 is an Austin, Texas-based psych/space rock band formed in 1987.

== History ==
ST 37 was founded in 1987 by bassist S.L. Telles, vocalist Carlton Crutcher, guitarist Joel Crutcher and drummer John Foxworth. Telles (previously part of the punk band Vast Majority) was in the Elegant Doormats, while the Crutcher brothers were in Tulum; Foxworth was in both bands. They were joined by keyboardist Jon Torn of Thanatopsis Throne. The band drew their name from a song by Chrome.

A series of cassette releases was followed by the band's first CD, The Invisible College, in 1992. The next few years saw the release of another album, Glare, the departure of Torn, and some other lineup changes, with Foxworth replaced by Lance Farley on drums, and he later by Lisa Cameron (then known as Dave), who had previously played with Brave Combo, Glass Eye, Three Day Stubble and Roky Erickson. Mark Stone joined in 1997 on guitar, and the band released their next studio album, Spaceage, in 1998.

That summer, they helped usher in a series of silent film screenings with live accompaniment at Austin's Alamo Drafthouse theater with a performance of their own score for Fritz Lang's 1927 film Metropolis. They later performed another original film score there, for Lang's 1921 film Destiny.

Following the release of two more albums in 1999 and 2000, Carlton Crutcher left to form the band Book of Shadows. Mark Stone left in the late 2000s, while Bobby Baker, a member of the Baby Robots and Rubble, joined as guitarist/vocalist in time for the 2010 release of High and Inside. Later, ST 37 added Chris Cones, formerly of Skullcaster, SubArachnoid Space and How I Quit Crack, on keyboards and electronics. The band continues to perform and record in Austin.

== Musical style ==
ST 37's sound combines several musical styles including space rock, psych, prog, punk, experimental rock and krautrock. In the band's early days, they aimed to combine two major influences: the space rock of Hawkwind and the raw, experimental rock of Chrome. Other influences include the 13th Floor Elevators, Can, Amon Düül II and Butthole Surfers. Their music has been described as "swirling", "multitextured" and "mind-altering space-punk". In 2013 the Austin Chronicle described the band's live performances as "drowning in a haze of guitar and reverb that can drift through cosmically shifting layers of aggressive punk riffs, fuzzed noise, and scalding jams".

== Discography ==
=== Albums ===
- from space w/love (1989, Blue Circle, cassette, LP)
- The Invisible College (1992, Over and Out, CD)
- John Deere Isolation Tank (1994, Blue Circle, cassette)
- Glare (1995, Helter Skelter/Prospective/Electric Jug, double LP)
- Spaceage (1998, Black Widow, LP + 7", CD)
- The Secret Society (1999, Lost, LP)
- I Love to Talk, if There's Anything to Talk About (2000, Emperor Jones, CD)
- Frantic Search for Zero (2001, Blue Circle, CD-R)
- Nunavut (2002, Blue Circle, double CD-R)
- Down On Us (2002, Emperor Jones, CD)
- The Insect Hospital (2004, Black Widow, double LP, CD)
- Live 2003 (2004, Blue Circle, CD-R)
- Destiny (2004, Blue Circle, double CD-R)
- and then what (2007, Noiseville, LP)
- High and Inside (2010, Blue Circle, CD)
- Awkward Moments (2012, Reverb Worship, CD-R)
- I'm Not Good (2014, Cleopatra, CD)
- ST 37 (2018, Super Secret Records, double LP, CD)

=== Singles/EPs ===
- billygoat nothinghead EP (1987, Blue Circle, cassette)
- "Look At Yr Chair / Pumpkinface" (1991, Over and Out, 7" single)
- "Taboo / Hoodoo" (1992, Noiseville, 7" single)
- "The Gypsy's Curse / Crab Nebula" (1993, Prospective, 7" single)
- I Smoked Kevin Costner's Shitty Pot EP (2000, Blue Circle, CD-R)
- "Lactating Purple", split single with the Linus Pauling Quartet (2010, 7" single)
- KBDP EP (2011, Kendra Steiner Editions, CD-R)

=== Compilations ===
- Future Memories (2005, Four/Four, CD-R)

=== Selected compilation appearances ===
- Various Artists, The Polyp Explodes (1988, Deadline, cassette)
- Various Artists, From Twisted Minds Come Twisted Products (1990, Noiseville, LP)
- Various Artists, Assassins Of Silence: Hundred Watt Violence (1995, Ceres, CD, double LP)
- Various Artists, Only Bowie (1995, Only Boy Records, CD)
- Various Artists, Live From the Devil's Triangle, Volume 2 (1999, KFJC, double CD)
- Various Artists, Children of Black Widow (2000, Black Widow, CD)
- Various Artists, What? Are You on Drugs? (2002, Ant Lunch Musick, CD)
- Various Artists, Hall of Mirrors (2005, Emperor Jones, double CD)
- Various Artists, You've Been Duplicated, Burning Chrome To Disc In The Cyberage (2005, Aktivator, CD)
- Various Artists, Garden of Eno (2010, Lost, LP)
