= Larry Thrasher =

American musician, remixer, and producer

Larry Thrasher (born 1959) is an American experimental musician, remixer, and producer. Thrasher was a member of Psychic TV, Thee Majesty and Splinter Test. In addition, Thrasher was in collaboration with Kim Cascone on the experimental noise project Thessalonians. He is credited under the aliases DJ Cheb I Sabbah Wa Mektoub, Baba Larry Ji,. and Larriji. He is also a long time follower of Meher Baba.

== Selected discography ==
Thessalonians:

- The Black Field (Silent Records) 1987
- Soulcraft (Silent Records) 1991
- Solaristics (Noh Poetry Records) 2005

Psychic TV:

- Trip Reset (Cleopatra Records) 1994
- Cathedral Engine (Dossier Records) 1994
- Electric Newspaper (CD-Serie) 1995-97
- Cold Blue Torch (Cleopatra Records) 1995

Splinter Test:

- Thee Fractured Garden 1996
- Spatial Memories (Dossier Records) 1997

Thee Majesty:

- Time's Up 1999
- Vitruvian Pan 2007

The Brian Jonestown Massacre

- Take It From The Man! 1996
