= Kim Cascone =

American composer of electronic music

- Born: Kim Cascone; December 21, 1955 (age 70); Albion, Michigan, United States
- Genres: Microsound, noise, ambient, dark ambient, drone, electro-acoustic, field recording, binaural beats
- Occupations: Composer, writer, sound designer, teacher, lecturer, music director
- Instruments: Laptop, Max/MSP, CSound, Pure Data, synthesizer, field recorder, Ardour, hydrophones, electric guitar
- Years active: 1983–present
- Labels: anechoicmedia Silent Records; Sub Rosa; Ritornell; Raster-Noton; C74; 12k Nexsound; Aural Terrains; Störung; Monotype; Emitter Micro timemachines Daathstaar
- Website: Silent Records

Kim Cascone (December 21, 1955) is an Italian American composer of electronic music who is known for his releases in the ambient, drone, industrial and electro-acoustic genre on his own record label, Silent Records.

== Biography ==
Studied Arranging and Composition, with a concentration on electronic music, at the Berklee College of Music in Boston Massachusetts from 1973 - 1976. Later studied syntheis privately at the New School in Manhattan under Dana McCurdy.

In 1989 Cascone became an assistant music editor for director David Lynch on Twin Peaks and Wild At Heart. Musically he has used various aliases over the years but became best known under the moniker Heavenly Music Corporation, a name taken from a track on the record (No Pussyfooting) by Brian Eno and Robert Fripp. Cascone released four full albums under this name from 1993 to 1996.

In 1996 Cascone sold Silent Records and Pulsoniq Distribution to work as a sound designer/composer for Thomas Dolby's company Beatnik. After leaving the company in 1998, Cascone went on to serve as the Director of Content for Staccato Systems, a spin-off company from CCRMA, Stanford University where he co-invented an algorithm for realistic audio atmospheres and backgrounds for video games called Event Modeling. He returned to making music in 1999 and has since been releasing records using his own name on various labels as well as his own label, anechoic (named after his last Heavenly Music Corporation release), which he established in 1996. Cascone has released more than 50 albums of electronic music since 1984 and has recorded or performed with Merzbow, Keith Rowe, Tony Conrad, Scanner, John Tilbury, Domenico Sciajno and Pauline Oliveros, among others.

In academic writing, Cascone is known for his paper The Aesthetics of Failure, which outlined the use of digital glitches and systemic failure in the creation of post-digital and laptop music. He is also on the advisory board of the academic sound journal Interference based in Dublin, Ireland.

Cascone holds dual Italian and American citizenship as of September 2008.

In 2016 Cascone rebooted his record label Silent Records.

From 2016 to 2017, Cascone served as the music director for The Silent Channel on SomaFM, an online streaming radio station that features the Silent Records catalog.

== Discography ==
- Blue Cube (Raster-Noton, 1998)
- Cathode Flower (Ritornell, 1999)
- (Delete) (Fällt, 2000)
- Residualism (Ritornell, 2001)
- Dust Theories (c74, 2001)
- The Crystalline Address, with Scanner (Sub Rosa, 2002)
- Pulsar Studies (anechoic, 2004)
- Rondo/7Phases/Blowback, with Merzbow (Sub Rosa, 2004)
- Gravity Handler (CRC, 2004)
- Statistically Improbable Phrases (anechoic, 2006)
- The Astrum Argentum (anechoic, 2008)
- Pharmacie: Green & Red (anechoic, 2008)
- Music for Dagger & Guitar (Aural Terrains, 2008)
- anti-musical celestial forces (Storung, 2009)
- The Knotted Constellation (fourteen rotted coordinates) (Monotype, 2011)
- Subflowers - Phi (Emitter Micro, 2016)

=== As PGR ===
- Silence (PGR, 1985)
- The Flickering of Sowing Time (RRRecords, 1986)
- Cyclone Inhabited by Immobility (Permis de Construire, 1987)
- The Black Field (Silent Records, 1989)
- Fetish, with Arcane Device (Silent Records, 1990)
- The Chemical Bride (Silent Records, 1992)
- The Morning Book of Serpents (Silent Records, 1995)
- A Hole of Unknown Depth (Silent Records, 1996)

=== As Heavenly Music Corporation ===
- In a Garden of Eden (Silent Records, 1993 / Astral Industries, 2018)
- Consciousness III (Silent Records, 1994)
- Lunar Phase (Silent Records, 1995 / Astral Industries, 2017)
- Anechoic (Silent Records, 1996)

=== As Khem One ===
- Copperopolis - Guitar Study (Humanhood Recordings, 2018)
- Modal Gauzes No. 1 - Guitar Study (Daathstaar, 2018)
- Pollen & Fragments (Daathstaar, 2018)
- Heliodronus - Messenger of the Sun (Silent Records, 2019)
- Lunadronus - The Realm of Lunar Gauzes (Silent Records, 2020)
- Threshold of Eastern Octaves (Silent Records, 2022)
- Subtle Immobilities (Silent Records, 2024)

=== With Thessalonians ===
- The Unwinding (Silent Records, 1986)
- The Concentration of Light Prior to Combustion (Banned Production, 1986)
- Imbrication 2: An Investigaton Into Documenting Change Systems (Angakok, 1988)
- The Black Field (Silent Records, 1989)
- Soulcraft (Silent Records, 1993)
- Solaristics (Noh Poetry Records, 2005)

=== With Spice Barons ===
- Future Perfect State (Silent Records, 1995)

=== With KGB Trio ===
- Swiss Pharmaceuticals (Utech, 2005)
- Smoke on Devil's Mountain (Scrapple Records, 2008)
- Noise Forest (Aural Terrains, 2009)

=== With Acéphale ===
- Kraut Vedas (Silent Records, 2024)

== Bibliography ==
- Cascone, Kim. "Aesthetics of Failure." Cambridge: MIT Press, 2000.
- Cascone, Kim. "Laptop music-counterfeiting aura in the age of infinite reproduction " Parachute 107, 2002.
- Cascone, Kim. "Grain, Sequence, System: Three Levels of Reception in the Performance of Laptop Music. Contemporary Music Review Volume 22, Issue 4, 2003.
- Cascone, Kim "Evolving the Emergent Content Workshop. Interace Cultures - Artistic Aspects of Interaction - Christa Sommerer, Laurent Mignonneau, Dorothee King (eds.), 2008.
- Cascone, Kim. "Grain of the Auditory Field" Junk Jet No.1, 2007.
- Cascone, Kim. "The Use of Density Groups in Electroacoustic Music" Contemporary Music Review, Volume 30, Issue 2, 2011.
- Cascone, Kim. "Residualism" Sound - Caleb Kelly MIT Press, 2011.
- Cascone, Kim. "Subtle Listening – How Artists Can Develop New Perceptual Circuits" Infinite Grain, March 30, 2014.
- Cascone, Kim. "Transcendigital Imagination: Developing Organs of Subtle Perception" Interference Journal of Sound, Volume 4, 2014.
- Cascone, Kim. "The Noise Field – a Metaphysical Model" liner notes to the album The Noise Fields by PS.T
