= Unreality (album) =

Studio album by SRSQ
- Released: October 26, 2018
- Genre: Ethereal dark wave
- Length: 39:21
- Label: Dais
- Producer: Matia Simovich

SRSQ chronology
Unreality (2018)	Ever Crashing (2022)

Singles from Unreality
- 1. "The Martyr" Released: August 22, 2018

Unreality is the debut solo album by Kennedy Ashlyn under the alias SRSQ. The album was released on October 26, 2018, by Dais Records. The project came after Ashlyn retired Them Are Us Too, her duo with Cash Askew, after Askew died in 2016. It was preceded by one single, "The Martyr". The album was received positively by critics, who compared its ethereal dark wave sound to bands such as Cocteau Twins and called its lyrics uplifting and celebratory.

== Background ==
Prior to SRSQ, Ashlyn was one half of the dream pop and dark wave duo Them Are Us Too with Cash Askew. The duo formed in 2012 and released one EP and one album together in 2015. Askew died in the Ghost Ship warehouse fire in 2016. Ashlyn subsequently completed Them Are Us Too's second album, Amends, which was released in June 2018. With Them Are Us Too officially disbanded after Amends, Ashlyn moved on to her solo career as SRSQ, which had started with her first live performance under the name in May 2017.

Ashlyn went into the album knowing its sound would be informed by her work with Them Are Us Too, and that its fundamental aspects will always be connected to Askew.

== Release ==
The album was first announced on August 24, 2018, and released on October 26 by Dais Records. The album was preceded by one single, "The Martyr", which was released on August 22. The album name came from Ashlyn's belief that the album speaks to "trying to process what a surreal world feels like in the wake of such a reality".

== Style ==
The music of Unreality has been called ethereal dark wave while also including influences of post-punk and neoclassical music. It has been compared to the output of the English record label 4AD, especially the 4AD band Cocteau Twins and their "goth-minded kin". Ashlyn's vocals have been compared to Cocteau Twins vocalist Elizabeth Fraser and fellow 4AD alum Dead Can Dance's Lisa Gerrard, as well as late-era David Bowie and Zola Jesus. The album has also been said to continue the musical direction of Ashlyn's former duo Them Are Us Too, though with "an added level of poignancy".

Though the album comes after Askew's death, the lyrics are noted as uplifting and celebratory, with Ashlyn sounding "utterly grateful" to have known Askew and offering hope while honoring Askew's memory.

== Reception ==
Unreality ratings
Review scores
Source	Rating
AllMusic	4/5 stars
Pitchfork	6.9/10
PopMatters	7/10

AllMusic's Paul Simpson called Unreality an "immensely beautiful, affecting record." PopMatters's Spyros Stasis said the album "feels a bit downgraded in terms of texture" and works best when Ashlyn experiments with additions of noise or subtle glitching sounds, which she only leans into occasionally but those moments are among the album's most powerful. Stasis concluded by calling the album "overall interesting" and revealing of Ashlyn's "further potential".

Critics consistently praised Ashlyn's vocals, calling them "astounding" and the "singular center of the record" with which she delivers "an unbelievable performance." Pitchfork's Larry Fitzmaurice noted that while the layers of "incantatory spoken-word" and "high-register vocal acrobatics" would typically be called "otherworldly", Ashlyn's have a "lovely human imperfection".

== Track listing ==
All tracks are written by Kennedy Ashlyn.

Unreality track listing
No.	Title	Length
1.	"Prelude"	2:23
2.	"The Martyr"	4:22
3.	"Cherish"	4:50
4.	"Procession"	5:43
5.	"Mixed Tide"	6:45
6.	"No Reason"	2:31
7.	"Permission"	5:32
8.	"Only One"	7:15
Total length:		39:21

== Personnel ==
- Kennedy Ashlyn – vocals, synthesizers, sequencing, album design
- Matia Simovich – producer, mixing and recording engineer
- Justin Kaye – assistant vocal engineer
- Chris Coady – recording engineer (3)
- Kevin Cellar – additional engineer (8)
- Josh Bonati – mastering engineer
- Kristin Cofer – album cover and insert photos
- Leigh Violet – album design
