= Modern Mirror =

Studio album by Drab Majesty
- Released: July 12, 2019
- Genres: Darkwave; gothic rock
- Length: 42:47
- Label: Dais Records
- Producers: Joshua Eustis, Deb Demure

Drab Majesty chronology
| The Demonstration (2017) | Modern Mirror (2019) |

Singles from Modern Mirror
- 1. "Ellipsis" Released: April 16, 2019; 2. "Oxytocin" Released: June 18, 2019; 3. "Out of Sequence" Released: July 11, 2019

Modern Mirror is the third studio album by the American darkwave band Drab Majesty. The album was released on July 12, 2019, by Dais Records.

== Critical reception ==
Professional ratings
Aggregate scores
| Source | Rating |
|---|---|
| Metacritic | 80/100 |
Review scores
| Source | Rating |
| Exclaim | 9/10 stars |
| Paste | 8.4/10 stars |
| AllMusic | 4/5 stars |
| PopMatters | 7/10 stars |

On its release, Modern Mirror received favorable reviews from music critics. At Metacritic, which assigns a normalized rating out of 100 to reviews from mainstream publications, the album received an average score of 80, based on 6 reviews. Reviewers drew comparisons to bands such as The Cure, The Church, Ministry, and OMD.

== Track listing ==
| No. | Title | Length |
|---|---|---|
| 1. | "A Dialogue" | 4:22 |
| 2. | "The Other Side" | 6:04 |
| 3. | "Ellipsis" | 5:06 |
| 4. | "Noise of the Void" | 5:32 |
| 5. | "Dolls in the Dark" | 4:51 |
| 6. | "Oxytocin" | 3:55 |
| 7. | "Long Division" | 5:04 |
| 8. | "Out of Sequence" | 7:53 |
| Total length: | | 42:47 |

== Personnel ==
Modern Mirror personnel adapted from Discogs.

Drab Majesty

- Deb Demure (Andrew Clinco) – guitars, vocals, synths, drum programming
- Mona D (Alex Nicolaou) – keyboards, vocals

Guest musicians

- Jasamine White-Gluz – additional vocals on "Long Division"
- Justin Meldal-Johnson – bass on "Out of Sequence"
- Joshua Eustis – additional keyboards

Production

- Joshua Eustis – production, mixing
- Deb Demure – co-production
- Dave Cooley – mastering
- Nedda Afsari – photography
- Juan Mendez – design, layout
