= Blending (album) =

Studio album by High Vis
- Released: 30 September 2022
- Recorded: 2021
- Genre: Britpop; post-hardcore; punk rock; post-punk
- Label: Dais
- Producer: Jonah Falco

High Vis chronology
No Sense No Feeling (2019)	Blending (2022)	Guided Tour (2024)

Singles from Blending
- 1. "Talk for Hours" Released: 15 April 2022; 2. "Fever Dream" Released: 14 June 2022; 3. "Blending" Released: 12 July 2022

Blending is the second studio album by English post-hardcore band High Vis. The album was released on 30 September 2022 through Dais Records.

== Style ==
The album has been described my music critics as a mixture of hardcore punk, with elements of Britpop, post-hardcore, and post-punk.

== Track listing ==
All tracks are written by Edward Harper, Graham Sayle, and Martin MacNamara.

Blending track listing
No.	Title	Length
1.	"Talk For Hours"	4:59
2.	"0151"	4:15
3.	"Out Cold"	2:16
4.	"Blending"	3:54
5.	"Trauma Bonds"	4:38
6.	"Fever Dream"	4:15
7.	"Morality Test"	3:51
8.	"Join Hands"	4:19
9.	"Shame"	5:19

== Critical reception ==
Professional ratings
Review scores
Source	Rating
Exclaim!	8/10
Pitchfork	6.7/10
The Skinny	5/5 stars
Treble	4.5/5 stars

Blending was generally well received by contemporary music critics.

Adam Turner-Heffer, writing for The Skinny awarded the album a perfect five-star rating, proclaiming that Blending is "record that is simultaneously angry and euphoric". Turner-Heffer described the album as a renaissance of punk rock music that follows the footsteps off the likes of bands like Idles musically with the swagger of Oasis.

In a slightly more mixed review Sue Park, writing for Pitchfork praised the album for its emotional backdrop but critiqued some songs for their derivative nature. Park said that "while its calls to action and emotional candor are undeniably moving, Blending ultimately feels as if the loose ends have been tucked out of sight, rather than tied up. Songs sometimes veer inscrutably towards arena rock, as on the album’s weakest track, “Join Hands,” and some lyrics can read simultaneously preachy and oblique."
