= High Functioning Flesh =

American industrial music duo

High-Functioning Flesh
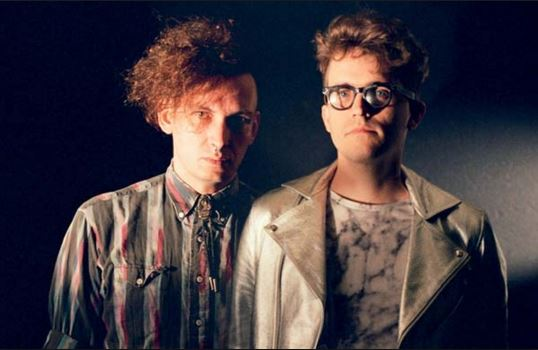
- From left to right: Susan Subtract and Gregory Vand

Background information
- Origin: Los Angeles, California, United States
- Genres: EBM, industrial
- Years active: 2012–present
- Labels: Dais, DKA
- Members: Susan Subtract; Gregory Vand
- Website: www.facebook.com/HxFxFx

High-Functioning Flesh (abbreviated as HFF) is an American industrial music duo, formed by Susan Subtract and Gregory Vand in Los Angeles, California. Forming in late 2012 following a Youth Code show, Subtract and Vand have released three studio albums, the most recent being 2017's Culture Cut. The duo are known for mixing dystopian, science fiction inspired lyrical concepts with 1980s musical sensibilities. They often refer to their music as being "electro-punk."

They have toured extensively throughout the United States and Europe, being featured in the line-ups for festivals including Cold Waves and Wave-Gotik-Treffen.

== History ==
Subtract and Vand, both of whom had been part of various punk bands over the years, began making music after they saw Youth Code perform in late 2012. By early 2013, the duo had completed their first song, "Video DNA Gestalt". Their debut album entitled A Unity of Miseries - A Misery of Unities was released in 2014 on DKA Records.

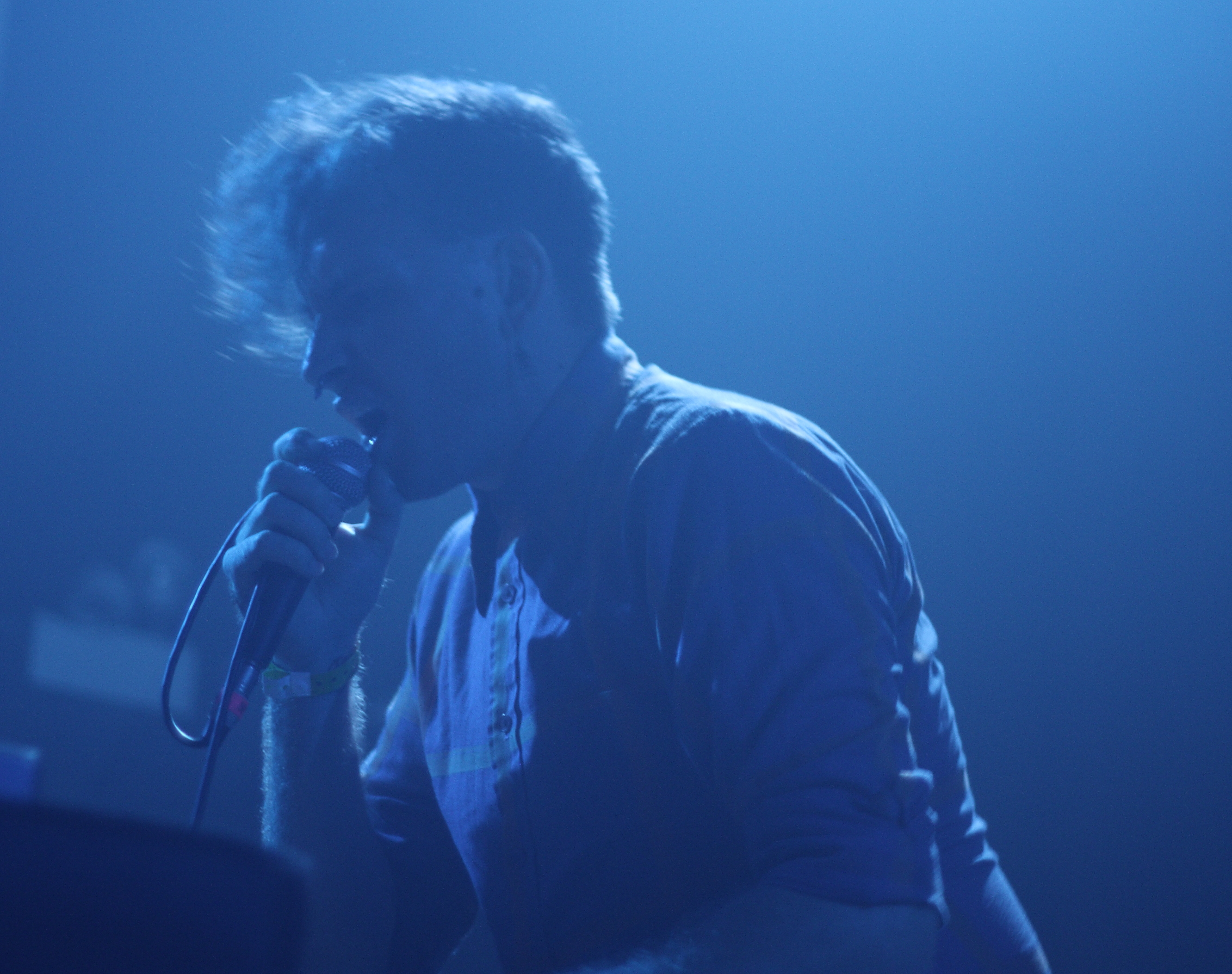
Susan Subtract performing at the 2015 Cold Waves festival

Influenced by the likes of Cabaret Voltaire, Portion Control, and Nitzer Ebb, the pair created music which pays tribute to the 1980s, often infusing elements of body horror and cyberpunk into their music and lyrics. Vice magazine has described the duo's musical style as "music that may be generally referred to as either synth-punk, EBM or industrial, referencing the spectrum of music that extends from Throbbing Gristle through Skinny Puppy."

The band signed with Dais Records and released their second album in 2015 entitled, Definite Structures. The album was described by SLUG Magazine as "reminiscent of early German industrial" music. Their 2016 single "Human Remains" was described as "the sort of thing you might hear at the peak of one of the more unsettling David Lynch films".

They have appeared on many national tours including the Cold Waves Festival and have opened for groups such as Front 242. They toured with fellow Dais Records band Body of Light in spring of 2016.

The group released their third studio album, Culture Cut, in 2017. Recorded using a variety of vintage synthesizers and new percussion instruments, the album served as an observation of life in the modern age. The album was promoted with a single titled "Talk About", released shortly before the full album. The single was described by Colin Joyce of Vice Magazine as "harrowing stuff, but it's full of surprising life—a case for pressing onward amidst chaos and destruction."

== Members ==
- Susan Subtract - vocals, keyboards (2012–present)
- Gregory Vand - keyboards, percussion, sampling (2012–present)

== Discography ==
=== Studio albums ===
- A Unity of Miseries - A Misery of Unities (2014)
- Definite Structures (2015)
- Culture Cut (2017)

=== Singles and EPs ===
- Demo Tape (2013)
- Human Remains (2016)

=== Compilations ===
- Strategies Against the Body: A Contemporary Survey (2015)
