= Oakland fire =

There have been two notable fires in Oakland, California:

- Oakland firestorm of 1991
- 2016 Oakland warehouse fire
