= Hiroko Kurihara =

American activist

Hiroko Kurihara is an American Oakland California-based designer and activist recognized for her role in the Oakland Art Murmur Movement, as a founder of the 25th Street Collective, and as a board member of the Oakland Asian Cultural Center. She is a graduate of Brown University and the Rhode Island School of Design.
