= Riki (American musician) =

American synth-pop musician

- Born: Niff Nawor
- Origin: Los Angeles, California, U.S.
- Genres: Synth-pop; dark wave; new wave; Italo disco
- Years active: 2017–present
- Label: Dais Records

Riki is the solo musical project of American musician and visual artist Niff Nawor, based in Los Angeles. Nawor was previously active in the deathrock and anarcho-punk scenes of the San Francisco Bay Area, where she served as keyboardist and backing vocalist of the band Crimson Scarlet. She launched Riki as a solo project in 2017 and has since released two studio albums on Dais Records.

Riki's music draws on influences from 1980s synth-pop, Italo disco, and Neue Deutsche Welle, and has been compared to artists such as Kate Bush, Pat Benatar, early Madonna, and Kim Wilde. Some of her songs feature lyrics in German.

== Early life and career ==
Nawor grew up in Oregon, where she discovered deathrock through bands such as Christian Death during high school. After moving to Oakland, she became involved in the local goth, deathrock, and punk scenes. She joined the deathrock band Crimson Scarlet as a keyboardist after initially being recruited to play bass. The band asked her to switch to synthesizer, and she learned to play on a Korg microKORG, sparking her interest in electronic music.

In addition to music, Nawor is a visual artist working in calligraphy, drawing, and sculpture.

== Riki project ==
=== Hot City (2017) ===
In 2017, Nawor recorded the Hot City EP as her first release under the name Riki. The EP featured contributions from Chelsey Crowley of Crimson Scarlet, Skot Brown of Phantom Limbs, and Peđa of Doomed to Extinction. It was initially released on Commodity Tapes and later reissued on vinyl by the Symphony of Destruction label. Following its release, Riki performed on several small tours and festival dates, supporting acts including Light Asylum, Black Marble, and Trisomie 21.

=== Riki (2020) ===
Riki signed to Dais Records in 2019. Her self-titled debut album was released on February 14, 2020, produced and engineered by Matia Simovich of the band INHALT. The album featured the lead singles "Napoleon" and "Earth Song", as well as tracks with German-language lyrics including "Strohmann" and "Böse Lügen (Body Mix)".

The debut received positive reviews. Loud and Quiet awarded it 9 out of 10, calling it "exactly what you want a debut to be: it's bristling with energy and ideas" and comparing Nawor's work to Kate Bush. Post-Punk.com selected it as their Album of the Month for February 2020.

=== Gold (2021) ===
Riki's sophomore album, Gold, was released on November 26, 2021, through Dais Records. It was produced by Telefon Tel Aviv co-founder Joshua Eustis at his studio. The lead single "Marigold" featured a duet with Eustis. Musically, the album shifted towards a more pop-oriented direction while retaining Riki's darkwave sensibilities.

musicOMH described the album as "nighttime music, tunes for neon-soaked streets and lost lovers" and praised Riki as "a modern-day new romantic". Spectrum Culture called it "a clear step up from its predecessor", noting that Riki "transcends her influences".

== Live performances ==
In 2021 and 2022, Riki performed at several festivals and shared the stage with acts such as Front 242, Stabbing Westward, Cold Cave, and Boy Harsher.

In May 2023, Riki performed at the Cruel World Festival in Pasadena, on a bill that included Iggy Pop, Siouxsie Sioux, and Billy Idol. That autumn, she toured as support for Cold Cave's North American headlining tour.

In 2025, Riki embarked on an 11-date tour across the United States and Canada.

== Discography ==
=== Studio albums ===
Year	Title	Label
2020	Riki	Dais Records
2021	Gold	Dais Records

=== EPs ===
Year	Title	Label
2017	Hot City	Commodity Tapes / Symphony of Destruction
