= Drab Majesty =

American band

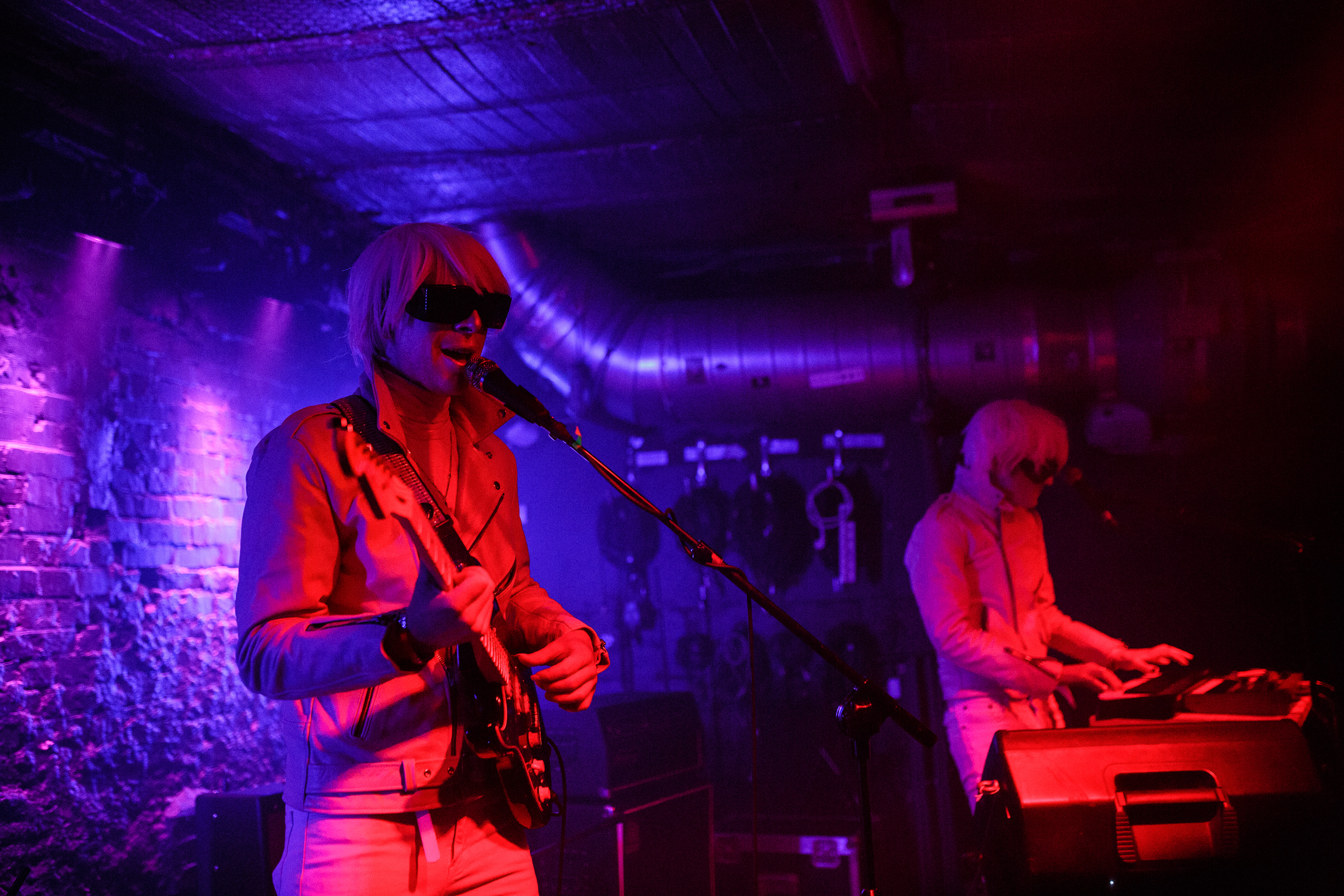
- Drab Majesty performing live in Warsaw, 2018

Background information
- Origin: Los Angeles, California, US
- Genres: Darkwave; dream pop; gothic rock; shoegaze
- Years active: 2011–present
- Label: Dais
- Members: Deb Demure; Mona D
- Website: drabmajesty.bandcamp.com

Drab Majesty is an American musical project founded by Andrew Clinco in Los Angeles, California in 2011. Clinco, the drummer for the band Marriages, adopted the androgynous character of Deb Demure for the project. Keyboardist and vocalist Mona D (Alex Nicolaou) joined the band in 2016.

Since signing to Dais Records, Drab Majesty has released three albums: Careless (2015), The Demonstration (2017) and Modern Mirror (2019).

Drab Majesty combine androgynous aesthetics and commanding vocals with futuristic and occult lyrics, a style Demure refers to as "tragic wave" and "mid-fi". To create his imposing stage presence, Demure employed costumes, makeup and props to accompany his lush, '80s-influenced soundscapes.

== History ==
=== Early history (2011–2015) ===
The idea for Drab Majesty came to Andrew Clinco in 2011 while drumming for the Los Angeles-based group Marriages. Interested in creating music where he performed all of the instruments himself, Clinco wrote and recorded several songs alone in his bedroom. Clinco stated that he felt some sense of alarm while playing back the music he had recorded, claiming that it was as if another person had made it. "Listening back I just didn’t feel like I was listening to myself [...] It sounded like someone else". This experience provided the inspiration for Clinco to create his alter ego, Deb Demure.

Clinco was originally a drummer, but Emma Ruth Rundle, his bandmate as the lead vocalist/guitarist in Marriages, inspired him to learn how to play the guitar for Drab Majesty. His biggest influences were Mark Kozelek's Red House Painters and Sun Kil Moon projects, as well as Vini Reilly of The Durutti Column and Maurice Deebank of Felt.

Drab Majesty's debut EP Unarian Dances was self-released in 2012. Initially limited to 100 cassette copies, the EP was later picked up and released by Lollipop Records. The record's title was inspired by the Unarian Academy, a UFO cult whose appearances on public-access television Demure described as being "intoxicating". The EP, which features some contributing guest vocals from Rundle, was described as a "space-age pastiche" and likened to the work of bands such as Slowdive.

Drab Majesty signed with Dais Records in 2015 and shortly thereafter released the single "Unknown to the I", which had been described as a "lo-fi take on the 80s". Careless, Drab Majesty's first full-length album, was released later that year. Recorded at Demure's home studio over the course of 2 years, Careless was inspired by a song a close friend of Demure's had written. The following year, Dais Records re-released the album with extra tracks featuring all studio material released thus far as a compilation titled Completely Careless. It consisted of all tracks from debut album Careless, plus the two B-sides from the "Unknown to the I" single, the five tracks of the Unarian Dances limited edition EP, new tracks "Waiting Game" and "Silhouette", and a remix of "The Foyer".

=== Becoming a duo (2016–present) ===
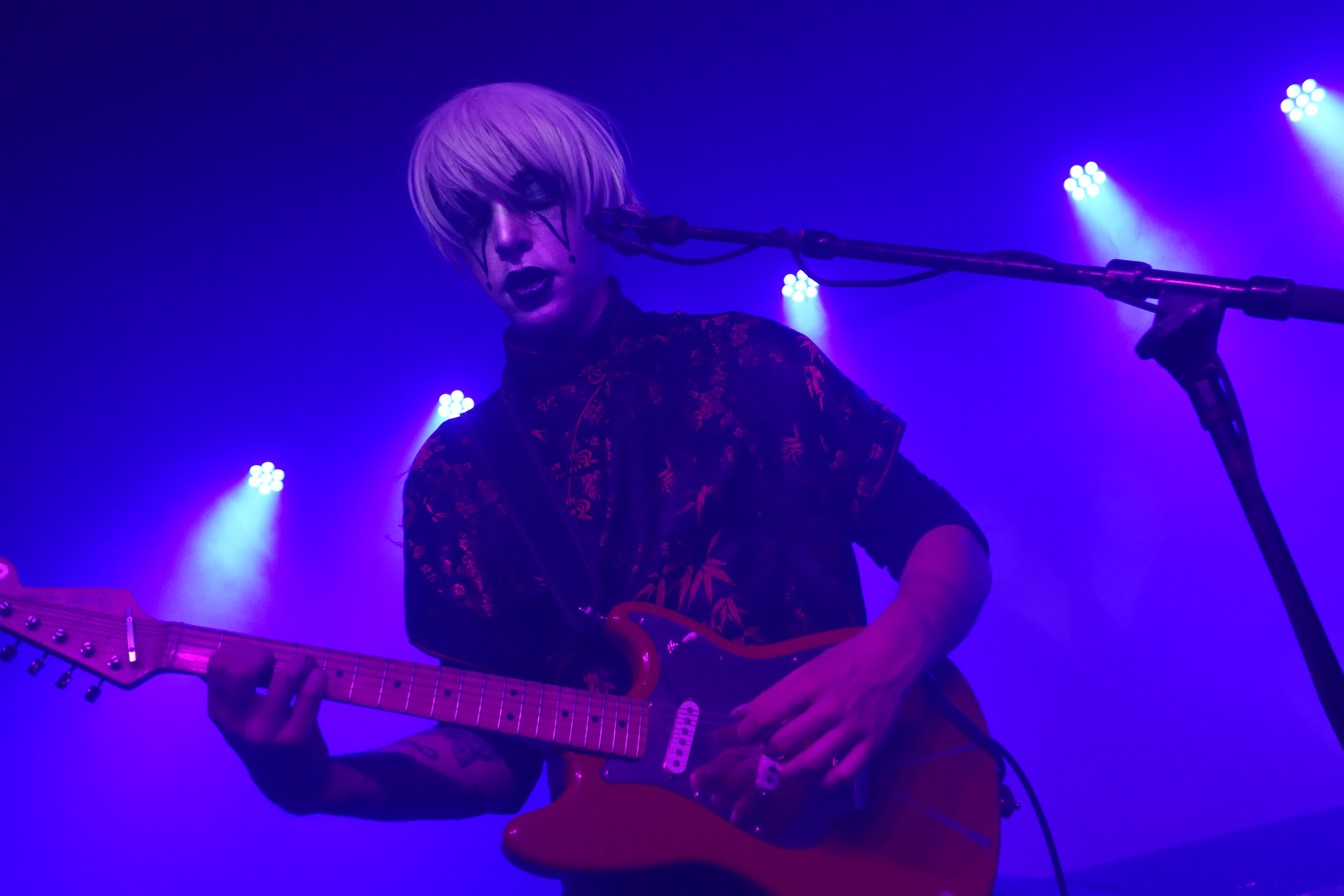
Deb Demure performing live in Brooklyn, 2016

In 2016, Drab Majesty expanded into a duo with the addition of keyboardist Alex Nicolaou, who performs as the character Mona D. He is the son of horror director Ted Nicolaou and was originally brought on to enhance the group's theatrics while touring North America and Europe in 2016.

Drab Majesty released their second album The Demonstration in January 2017 to favorable reviews. The Demonstration is a concept album that deals with the psychology of mass suicide, referencing in particular the ideology of Marshall Applewhite, the leader of the Heaven's Gate cult. The duo toured North America with Cold Cave, and later toured Europe alongside King Dude, with whom they collaborated on the single "Who Taught You How to Love?" the year before.

In late 2017, the duo released a 7-inch single, titled "Oak Wood", for the 10th anniversary celebration of Dais Records. The song was written in honor of Cash Askew, co-founder of the band Them Are Us Too, who died in the 2016 Oakland warehouse fire. The title "Oak Wood", according to Demure, is a direct translation of Askew's name. The single featured a B-side called "Egress", an instrumental guitar piece. The duo embarked on their North American Fall From the Sky tour in September; the tour included a stop at the 2017 Cold Waves Festival in Chicago. They extended their tour to Europe in Winter of 2018.

Drab Majesty's third album, Modern Mirror, was released in 2019, supported by the singles "Ellipsis", "Oxytocin" and "Out of Sequence". The band was scheduled to play the goth, post-punk and new wave festival Cruel World in 2020, which was postponed until 2022.

Over the COVID-19 pandemic, Demure worked more on his side project VR Sex. In 2022, Drab Majesty opened for AFI on their fall tour. Demure revealed that the band would add a live drummer soon within the next year.

On June 6, 2023, Drab Majesty released "Vanity" featuring Slowdive's Rachel Goswell, the lead single to their EP An Object in Motion. The EP was released on August 25. Drab Majesty opened for Slowdive during their North American tour in 2023 and 2024. In May 2024, Drab Majesty released "Photograph" for the soundtrack to the film I Saw the TV Glow. Director Jane Schoenbrun asked the band to compose a song similar to "that Echo & the Bunnymen song on the Pretty In Pink soundtrack" ("Bring On the Dancing Horses").

== Members ==
- Andrew "Deb Demure" Clinco - guitars, vocals, percussion (2011–present)
- Alex "Mona D" Nicolaou - keyboards, vocals (2016–present)

== Discography ==
=== Studio albums ===
- Careless (2015)
- The Demonstration (2017)
- Modern Mirror (2019)

=== Singles ===
- "Unknown to the I" (2015)
- "The Heiress"/"The Demon" (2016)
- "Oak Wood" (2017)
- "Ellipsis" (2019)
- "Long Division" (2019)
- "Oxytocin" (2019)
- "Out of Sequence" (2019)
- "No Rain" (2020)
- "Photograph" (2024)

=== EPs ===
- "Unarian Dances" (2012)
- "An Object in Motion" (2023)

=== Compilations ===
- Completely Careless [2012-2015] (2016)
