= Guided Tour (High Vis album) =

Studio album by High Vis
- Released: 18 October 2024
- Recorded: 2023–2024
- Studio: Holy Mountain Studios
- Length: 37:39
- Label: Dias
- Producer: Jonah Falco

High Vis chronology
Blending (2022)	Guided Tour (2024)

Singles from Guided Tour
- 1. "Mob DLA" Released: 11 June 2024; 2. "Mind's a Lie" Released: 31 July 2024; 3. "Drop Me Out" Released: 17 September 2024; 4. "Guided Tour" Released: 16 October 2024

Guided Tour is the third studio album by English post-hardcore band, High Vis. The album was released on 18 October 2024 through Dais Records.

== Background and recording ==
Following the release of their second album, Blending, in 2022, High Vis entered a period of increased activity, including extensive touring. This period also marked a transition for the band members, with several committing to music full-time. In early 2023, High Vis began working on Guided Tour. The recording sessions took place at Holy Mountain Studios in London with producer Jonah Falco, known for his work with various post-punk and hardcore acts. The band continued their collaboration with engineer Misha Hering, who had worked with them on previous projects.

Drummer Edward "Ski" Harper played a significant role in the initial songwriting process, often creating early demos using Ableton, layering basslines and programmed drum tracks to establish foundational ideas. However, the band adopted a distinct approach to avoid over-reliance on demos. Instead of bringing pre-recorded versions into the studio, they recorded tracks from memory, aiming to preserve spontaneity and energy in their performances.

During production, the band sought to refine their sound while maintaining the raw qualities present in their earlier work. Falco played a key role in guiding this process, helping shape the album’s sonic direction. The recording process emphasized live performance energy, ensuring that the final arrangements could be effectively reproduced on stage. High Vis completed recording by late 2023.

== Artwork and title ==
The album cover features a photo of an unnamed child on a motorcycle in front of a mobile shop in Liverpool taken in the 1980s. The photo was taken by David Sinclair, and was chosen to be the album cover because "his work captures the warmth of being a kid, and reminds him of his own childhood spent fucking around on bikes on the promenade."

== Release and promotion ==
=== Singles ===
High Vis released four singles leading up to the launch of their third studio album, Guided Tour, on October 18, 2024: "Mob DLA", "Mind's a Lie", "Drop Me Out", and the self-titled track, "Guided Tour".

Released on 11 June 2024 "Mob DLA" served as the album's lead single. The track addresses the impact of public service cuts in the UK, highlighting the challenges faced by marginalized communities in accessing support for disabilities. Vocalist Graham Sayle drew inspiration from personal experiences, noting the stress and anxiety experienced by those navigating a system that often feels designed against them. Musically, the song combines a street punk energy with post-hardcore elements, reflecting the band's roots and evolving sound.

The second single, "Mind's a Lie," was released on 31 July 2024. This track marked a stylistic shift for High Vis, incorporating influences from house, baggy and trip-hop genres. The song features a laid-back sample by South London DJ and singer Ell Murphy, blending electronic beats with the band's signature guitar work. Lyrically, it explores themes of mental health and the societal challenges associated with it. "Drop Me Out", the album's third single was released on 17 September 2024, and was described as a return to the band's punk rock roots, with a high-energy tempo and composition. The song delves into themes of shared trauma and broken loyalty, with Sayle's vocals delivering poignant reflections on personal relationships and societal pressures.

The title track, "Guided Tour," was unveiled on 16 October 2024, just two days before the album's release. This song encapsulates the band's fusion of Britpop and post-punk influences, featuring jangly guitars and anthemic choruses. The lyrics reflect on the search for meaning and connection amidst societal decay, resonating with the overarching themes of the album.

=== Music video ===
One music video to accompany the album was released, for the third single "Mind's a Lie". The music video was released on 31 July 2024 and was directed by Martina Pastori. The video features Welsh movement artist Sem Osian, portraying a young man grappling with feelings of paranoia, anger, and isolation. Set against the backdrop of South London, the narrative delves into themes of class struggles and mental health challenges. Frontman Graham Sayle explained that the song examines how negative habits can quickly dominate when positive outlets are lacking, especially in the context of reduced access to essential mental health services due to governmental indifference. The video underscores the impact of societal neglect on individual well-being, highlighting the descent into anger and isolation when adequate support is unavailable.

== Critical reception ==
Professional ratings
Aggregate scores
Source	Rating
Metacritic	82/100
Review scores
Source	Rating
DIY	4/5 stars
Exclaim!	3/5 stars
Kerrang!	5/5 stars
God is in the TV	8/10
Guardian	5/5 stars
Pitchfork	7.6/10
Under the Radar	8/10 stars

Guided Tour received critical acclaim upon its release from contemporary music critics. On review aggregator website, Metacritic, Guided Tour has an average rating of 82 out of 100 indicating "universal acclaim".

Daniel Dylan Wray, writing for The Guardian, gave the album five stars out of five. Dylan Wray said of Guided Tour, that the album's "anthemic swagger and psychedelic fuzz of Feeling Bless and Gone Forever feel none-more British, but it’s more Echo and the Bunnymen than Madchester, and thoroughly unburdened by pastiche. With its tough shell and soft underbelly, Guided Tour is a triumph." Luke Morton, writing for Kerrang! also awarded the album a perfect five-star rating saying that Guided Tour is an "incredible album" and that the album "solidify (High Vis's) status as British hardcore’s torchbearers".

Madison Bloom, writing for Pitchfork awarded the album a 7.6 out of 10, describing Guided Tour as "a rousing Britpop manifesto that transmutes grime and drudgery into raw-nerved power ballads". Bloom further said of Guided Tour "rather than dusting off a relic of the past, High Vis retool it to serve who they have become", in describing the album as a whole and how the band has evolved. Josh Allen, writing for God is in the TV awarded the album a four-star rating, saying that Guided Tour is "an album that helps to elevate their discography even further, a true hattrick of albums that any band would be jealous of."

In a more critical to mixed review, Marko Djurdjić of Exclaim! described Guided Tour as an unoriginal album and very campy in post-punk and crankwave style. Djurdjić wrote that "while High Vis's aural and sonic explorations are beyond commendable, the issue that often arises with this kind of songwriting is that the whole approach begins to grow a bit thin, feeling more derivative than experimental; the only through-line is Sayle's voice, which gives the band some consistency." Djurdjić ultimately gave the album a 6 out of 10.

== Accolades ==
=== Year-end lists ===
A "—" denotes the publication's list is in no particular order, and Guided Tour did not rank numerically.

Publication	Country	Accolade	Rank	Ref.
Alternative Press	US	50 Best Albums of 2024	—	
BrooklynVegan	US	Top 50 Albums of 2024	26	
Kerrang!	UK	50 Best Albums of 2024	5	
Ringer	US	The 30 Best Albums of 2024	26	
Pitchfork	US	30 Best Rock Albums of 2024	29	
PopMatters	US	80 Best Albums of the Year	73	
Rolling Stone UK	UK	Rolling Stone UK's 24 Best Albums of 24	—	
Rough Trade UK	UK	Rough Trade's Albums of the Year	51	
Stereogum	US	Stereogum's 50 Best Albums of 2024	36	
