= Commitment to Complications =

Studio album by Youth Code
- Released: April 8, 2016
- Genres: Electro-industrial; EBM
- Length: 39:22
- Label: Dais Records (DAIS085)
- Producer: Rhys Fulber

Youth Code chronology
Youth Code (2013)	Commitment to Complications (2016)

Singles from Post Self
- 1. "Anagnorisis" Released: October 2015

Commitment to Complications is the second studio album by American electro-industrial duo Youth Code, released on April 8, 2016 through Dais Records. The album was produced by Rhys Fulber of Front Line Assembly.

"Anagnorisis" was released as a 7-inch single in 2015 with the B-side "Shift of Dismay".

== Background and composition ==
Following two tours opening for Skinny Puppy, Youth Code returned to the studio to begin their sophomore album. Rhys Fulber of Front Line Assembly, another band Youth Code opened for, was brought in to produce the album. About the refinement of their music, Ryan George said:

"This [album], we’d been a band for a while and we’ve been able to soak in our music influence, and get a blueprint of what we do. This record is obviously our second LP but in a lot of ways feels like our first real record. Like, this is how Youth Code sounds, this is what we do."

== Critical reception ==
Professional ratings
Review scores
Source	Rating
AllMusic	3.5/5 stars
Brutal Resonance	8/10
MetalSucks	Favorable
Pitchfork	7.5
PopMatters	8/10 stars
Soundblab	7/10

Commitment to Complications was met with generally positive reviews. Writing for AllMusic, Neil Z. Yeung saw the album as a refinement of Youth Code's sound, saying, "Commitment to Complications demonstrates clear growth from the former hardcore kids, establishing Youth Code as a distinctive duo instead of merely a derivative tribute to their influences." Andy O'Connor of Pitchfork wrote that the album "strikes the ideal balance between the visceral nature of the innovative L.A. hardcore group Youth Code's demo and the polish in their work since then." In his review of Commitment to Complications, Hans Rollman of PopMatters commended Youth Code for reinvigorating industrial and electronic music, saying the band is undoubtedly worth following.

== Track listing ==
All songs written by Sara Taylor and Ryan George.

No.	Title	Length
1.	"(Armed)"	2:04
2.	"Transitions"	2:43
3.	"Commitment to Complications"	3:32
4.	"The Dust of Fallen Rome"	4:37
5.	"Anagnorisis"	4:48
6.	"Doghead"	5:04
7.	"Glass Spitter"	2:45
8.	"Lacerate Wildly"	4:06
9.	"Avengement"	2:22
10.	"Shift of Dismay"	3:19
11.	"Lost at Sea"	3:43
Total length:		39:22

== Personnel ==
Youth Code

- Sara Taylor – vocals, keyboards, synthesizers, sampling
- Ryan George – keyboards, synthesizers, sampling, backing vocals

Additional personnel

- Rhys Fulber – production, mixing
- Josh Bonati – mixing
- Ben Falgoust – vocals (3)
- Todd Jones – guitars (10)
