= Them Are Us Too =

American dream pop and darkwave band

- Also known as: TAUT
- Origin: Santa Cruz, California
- Genres: dream pop; darkwave
- Years active: 2012–2016
- Label: Dais Records
- Spinoffs: SRSQ
- Past members: Kennedy Ashlyn; Cash Askew

Them Are Us Too was an American dream pop and darkwave band, consisting of Kennedy Ashlyn and Cash Askew. The duo formed in 2012 while both were students at University of California, Santa Cruz. After signing to Dais Records, they released their debut album Remain. Askew died in the Ghost Ship warehouse fire in 2016, after which Ashlyn finished their second album Amends, retired the Them Are Us Too name, and began releasing solo music as SRSQ.

== Band development ==
Them Are Us Too (TAUT) was formed as a "solo high school bedroom noise pop project" by Kennedy Ashlyn. She had grown up listening to 1980s music, such as the B-52s, Cocteau Twins, and Dead Can Dance. At five years old, she began singing in a choir, and she also participated in musical theater. She did opera training in college.

In 2012, Ashlyn and Askew met at University of California, Santa Cruz at Askew's 19th birthday party. The party had a "goth" theme, and attendants listened to music such as Cocteau Twins, The Sisters of Mercy, and Depeche Mode. The two bonded over shared musical tastes at the party.

Askew had grown up in San Francisco, California. She identified as transgender and used feminine pronouns. She first learned guitar from her stepfather, Sunny Haire, who was the former manager of the Lexington Club. In an interview, Askew explained, "As a young teenager, I was definitely attracted to goth and new wave in part because of the androgyny. And that aesthetic gave me a way to explore my gender expression before I could even come to terms with being transgender.” While at UC Santa Cruz, she was a student at Kresge College.

One day after the birthday party, Ashlyn invited Askew to join her band. As Ashlyn recalled,

"The day after the party, I was playing one of the only three Them Are Us Too shows that I did without Cash, at this weird hippy commune. We were drinking moonshine, walking around arm in arm, and I was just like, 'You should be in my band.' It was pretty immediate—day one: friends; day two: bandmates. We’d always call her birthday our 'friendaversary,' and then the next day is our 'bandaversary.'

In their first session, Askew attempted to play the synthesizer, but she then switched to the guitar.

== Musical sensibility ==
The duo felt a deep creative connection. As explained by Ashlyn, "There are things that I could say to Cash like, 'The snare should be like this,' or even, 'Can we make that bass tone a little bluer?' And she would know exactly what I was talking about."

The band had a dark aesthetic, but the duo rejected the "gothic" label. As Ashlyn noted, "We weren't [into] like the lifestyle goth by any means. We always felt personally a little tongue-in-cheek [towards it]... I see more of a parallel in this new [era] of darkwave music. People like Drab Majesty, Boy Harsher, Tamaryn—basically all of my friends."

== Albums and tours ==
At first, TAUT recorded an 8-song demo out of Ashlyn's bedroom. Soon after, the duo dropped out of college in 2014 and began a West Coast tour. The band played shows in Los Angeles, where they met Sara Taylor of Youth Code. Through Taylor, the group were introduced to people from Dais Records.

In 2015, TAUT released their debut album, Remain, on Dais Rercords. At the time, both Ashlyn and Askew were 21 years old. On the Dais Records website, it was written, "With a nod to 80’s shoegaze sensibilities, Them Are Us Too creates songs about tragedy and loves-lost that draws devoted listeners to their nostalgic and innocent sound." The voice of Kennedy Ashlyn was compared to Kate Bush and Elizabeth Fraser. Meanwhile, Askew played guitars and "paints a layered and complex backdrop," with reverberation and "washes of stringed ambient tones."

Following the release of Remain, TAUT played at various musical festivals, including the Terminus Festival in Calgary, Canada. In this period, they also began to work on songs for a second album. In the summer of 2015, the band recorded with Michael Stock at the KXLU 88.9 FM studio for the Part Time Punks studio sessions. The music video for "Eudaemonia" premiered in August 2015, and the pair were interviewed by various media outlets, such as Vice Magazine. In the fall of 2015, the band toured with Wax Idols. Askew moved to Oakland, California and Ashlyn moved to Denton, Texas. While Askew was in Oakland, she worked on two solo projects: Prist (techno music) and Heavenly ("emotional noise").

== Ghost Ship fire ==
On December 2, 2016, Askew died in the Ghost Ship warehouse fire. She was 22 years old. Askew had planned to attend the Ghost Ship event with her girlfriend, Anya Taylor, but Taylor had decided to not attend, since she had to work at a coffee shop in the early morning. Once the news of the fire broke out, Taylor rushed to the scene with four friends, but there was nothing they could do. “We knew our girls were in there. All we could do was stand there," Taylor said. The Ghost Ship fire left a profound impact on underground arts communities of the San Francisco Bay Area and the United States.

In 2017, the band Drab Majesty released the song "Oak Wood" in memory of Askew. In 2018, Ashlyn released Amends, which featured songs that the duo planned to record together. In December 2016, Askew was commemorated along with other victims of the Ghost Ship fire at the "Oakland United" benefit concert. At the concert, Ashlyn and Anya Taylor, Askew's girlfriend, performed a rendition of "Sweetness" by Jimmy Eat World in her memory Ashlyn continued making music under the name SRSQ.

== Studio albums ==
- Part-Time Punks (EP, 2015)

No.	Title	Length
1.	"Us Now"	7:14
2.	"Eudaemonia"	4:23
3.	"Creepy Love/694 MI"	11:14
4.	"Could Deepen"	10:28
Total length:		33:19

- Remain (2015)

No.	Title	Length
1.	"Eudaemonia"	4:21
2.	"The Problem with Redheads"	6:32
3.	"Us Now"	5:21
4.	"Marilyn"	3:40
5.	"False Moon"	5:52
6.	"Creepy Love"	4:22
7.	"694 MI"	5:47
8.	"Fall"	4:47
Total length:		40:42

- Amends (October 10, 2018)

No.	Title	Length
1.	"Angelene"	5:38
2.	"Grey Water"	5:39
3.	"Floor"	5:28
4.	"No One"	5:44
5.	"Could Deepen"	9:48
6.	"Amends"	5:54
Total length:		38:11
