= 25th Street Collective =

Business incubator in California

- Abbreviation: 25C
- Formation: 2010
- Founder: Hiroko Kurihara
- Type: Business incubator / artisan collective
- Purpose: Artisan entrepreneurship, sustainable fashion, and local food
- Headquarters: Oakland, California, United States
- Key people: Hiroko Kurihara

The 25th Street Collective, also known as 25C, is a business incubator in Oakland, California. It was founded in 2010 by Hiroko Kurihara. The collective is part of the larger community engaged in the Oakland Art Murmur project.

Collective Members

- Two Mile Wines
- OaklandSewn
- Moxie Shoes
- Hiroko Kurihara Designs
- Platinum Dirt
- COLE Coffee
- Ecologique Fashion
- Scorpion Sisters jewelry
- O’Lover Hats

== See also ==
- Oakland Art Murmur
- Ghost Ship warehouse fire
