= SRSQ =

American singer and keyboardist

- Also known as: Kennedy Ashlyn
- Born: Kennedy Ashlyn Wenning
- Origin: Santa Cruz, California
- Genres: Dream pop
- Occupation: Musician
- Instruments: Vocals, keyboards
- Label: Dais
- Formerly of: Them Are Us Too

SRSQ (pronounced "seer-skew") is the solo musical project of American singer and keyboardist Kennedy Ashlyn. Ashlyn started making music under the name Them Are Us Too in high school, later expanding the group to a duo after meeting Cash Askew in college. After releasing one album together, Askew died in the Ghost Ship warehouse fire in 2016. Ashlyn retired their shared name and started working as SRSQ the following year. Under the name, Ashlyn has released two albums, Unreality (2018) and Ever Crashing (2022). SRSQ's dream pop-centric sound has drawn comparisons to bands such as Cocteau Twins.

== Early life ==
Ashlyn, full name Kennedy Ashlyn Wenning, started off in music singing in a choir at age 5. She performed in musical theater and show choir in school and took a year of opera training in college. She started making noise pop music solo under the Them Are Us Too name in high school. Growing up, Ashlyn's favorite band was the B-52's, and she also grew up listening to bands such as Cocteau Twins, Dead Can Dance, and the Sundays, music she picked up on from her mom's taste.

Ashlyn went to college at University of California, Santa Cruz, living in a house. Her housemates offered to host their friend Askew's 19th birthday party in 2012. The party was goth-themed, with an Askew-curated soundtrack including Cocteau Twins, Depeche Mode, and the Sisters of Mercy. Neither Ashlyn nor Askew were goths, but they shared interest in the music and aesthetic which none of their other friends did. Less than 24 hours later, after performing her third-ever solo show, Ashlyn asked Askew to join Them Are Us Too.

== Career ==
=== Them Are Us Too ===
The duo recorded a demo together and toured the West Coast. They signed to Dais Records and both dropped out of school. Dais released their debut album, Remain, on March 24, 2015, when the duo were both 21 years old. They toured more and worked on more music, but never released a second album together. On December 2, 2016, a fire broke out at the former warehouse-turned-concert venue the Ghost Ship in Fruitvale, Oakland, California. Askew was among 36 people who died in the fire, with her body having been identified two days after. Ashlyn's last conversation with Askew, from earlier in the day of the fire, was about a demo the latter had recorded for the song "No One", the first song Askew had written for the duo.

Ashlyn, having moved to Dallas the previous year, flew back to Oakland immediately, staying at Askew's girlfriend Anya Dross's house. The two started making music together, and performed a cover of Jimmy Eat World's "Sweetness" in tribute to Askew at a benefit concert on December 14, before Ashlyn returned to Dallas the following January. She spent most of the subsequent six months in bed, accomplishing little beyond her debut SRSQ show in May 2017. She has said she remembers little of that period, even what songs she performed at the May concert. After a time working as SRSQ, Ashlyn got back in the studio with Dross and Askew's stepfather Sunny Haire to record one last Them Are Us Too release. That album, Amends, was released on June 29, 2018, by Dais. Amends consists mainly of songs written by the duo which were planned to be on their eventual second album, with the closing title track having been written by Ashlyn as her "own goodbye to the project and to Cash." The album also includes a finished version of "No One" with lead vocals by Dross. With the release of Amends, Ashlyn officially retired Them Are Us Too and moved fully into SRSQ.

=== SRSQ ===
Ashlyn chose the name SRSQ, pronounced "seer-skew" and originally stylized as "srsQ", as shorthand for "serious question". Ashlyn says that because of the two words which act as its phonetic components, its meaning has expanded to include being "like a warped seer, or a skewed vision." The project was originally intended as an outlet for Ashlyn to experiment with pop song remixes and noise music.

Ashlyn gave her first performance as SRSQ in May 2017. On August 24, 2018, she announced her debut solo album Unreality, which was released by Dais on October 26.

On August 16, 2019, Uniform and the Body released the collaborative album Everything That Dies Someday Comes Back, with SRSQ providing vocals to the song "Patron Saint of Regret". The same year, Jorge Elbrecht released the album Gloss Coma – 002, with SRSQ featuring on the song "The Entrance of Cold" alongside Molina and Samantha Urbani.

SRSQ's second album, Ever Crashing, was announced on May 9, 2022, and released on August 19, also by Dais.

In February 2023, SRSQ was announced as part of the lineup of Oblivion Access, a music festival in Austin, Texas, which ran from June 15–18. The next month, she was announced to be joining Frankie Rose on a tour of US and Canada in May and June. In September, she supported Cold Cave on tour in the US. In November, Vyva Melinkolya released the album Unbecoming, featuring SRSQ's vocals on the track "Bruise".

On January 2, 2026, Ashlyn released her new single "Born Alone, Die Alone", her first new single in over three years. The song focuses on themes of loss, grief, and loneliness.

== Style ==
SRSQ is primarily referred to as a dream pop project, though her music has also been said to include genres such as darkwave, post-punk, and gothic rock, and has been compared to artists such as Cocteau Twins, My Bloody Valentine, and Dead Can Dance.

Ashlyn has described Cocteau Twins as "kind of in my blueprint as a person and artist", and also named major influences such as Slowdive and the Knife.

=== Equipment ===
Ashlyn primarily writes and plays music on synthesizers such as a Yamaha PSR-48 and a Roland JX-3P, which she runs through effects pedals including the DOD Electronics Death Metal Distortion FX86B, Boss MT-2 Metal Zone, and Strymon BlueSky reverb pedal. She uses Roland's VT-3 Aira for vocal manipulation.

== Personal life ==
Ashlyn moved to East Dallas, Texas, in 2015 to be with her girlfriend, fellow musician Leigh Violet of Psychic Killers and Visage Irregular. Ashlyn met Violet while on tour with Them Are Us Too, and decided to move across the country to be with her despite being advised against doing so. As of 2025, Ashlyn was living in her childhood home, having broken up with her girlfriend after an eight-year relationship.

Ashlyn has been diagnosed with ADHD and bipolar disorder, which served as the main inspiration and subject matter for Ever Crashing. She is a queer femme.

== Discography ==
=== Albums ===
- Unreality (2018, Dais)
- Ever Crashing (2022, Dais)

=== EPs ===
- "Unreality" Live Sessions (2020)

=== Singles ===
Year	Title	Album
2018	"The Martyr"	Unreality
2019	"Temporal Love" / "Unkept"	Non-album single
2022	"Someday I Will Bask in the Sun"	Ever Crashing
2022	"Saved for Summer"	Ever Crashing
2022	"Used to Love"	Ever Crashing
2022	"Abyss"	Ever Crashing
2026	"Born Alone, Die Alone"	

=== Guest appearances ===
Year	Artist	Song	Album
2019	Uniform and the Body	"Patron Saint of Regret"	Everything That Dies Someday Comes Back
2019	Jorge Elbrecht	"The Entrance of Cold"	Gloss Coma – 002
2023	Vyva Melinkolya	"Bruise"	Unbecoming
