= High Vis =

English rock band

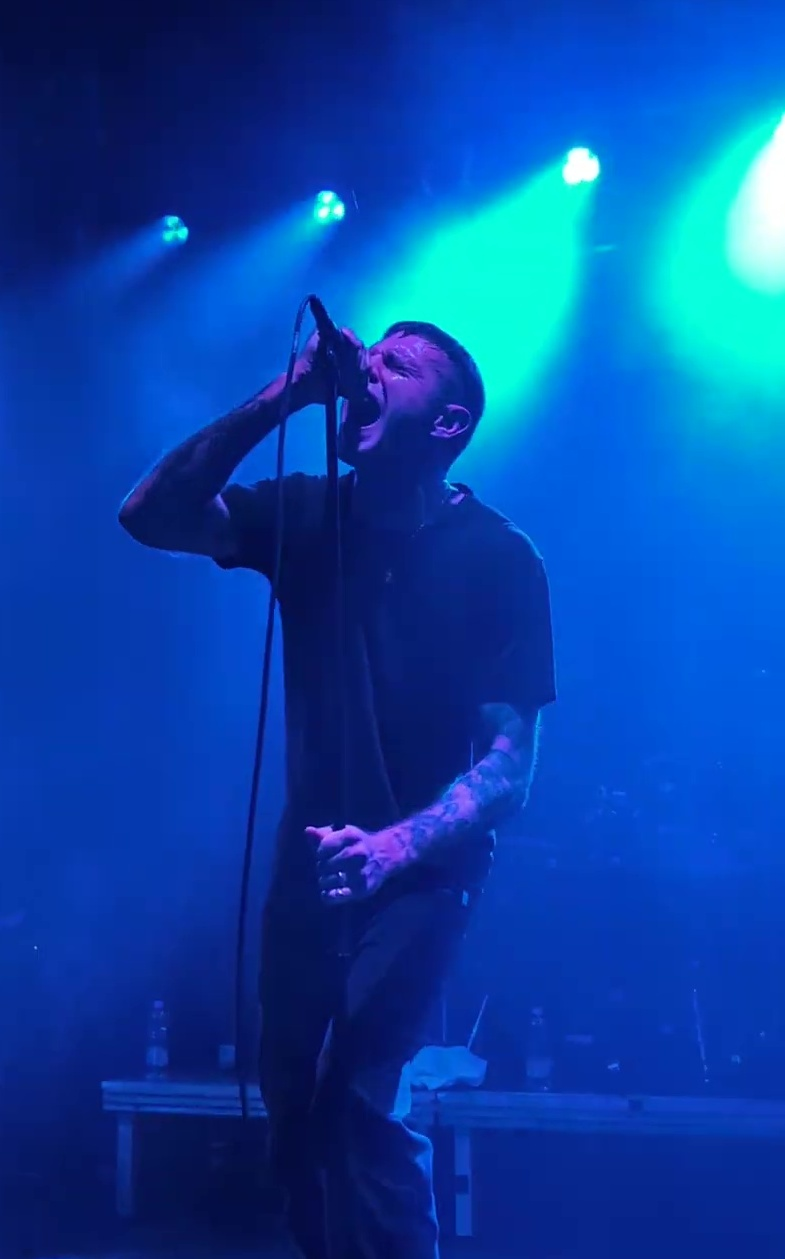
- High Vis performing live in 2023

Background information
- Origin: London, U.K.
- Genres: Hardcore punk; post-punk; indie rock; post-hardcore
- Years active: 2016–present
- Labels: Dais; Venn; Farewell
- Members: Graham Sayle; Rob Hammeren; Edward "Ski" Harper; Martin MacNamara; Jack Muncaster
- Past members: Romain Bruneau; Rob Moss; Gal Oren
- Website: highvisuk.com

High Vis is an English rock band formed in London in 2016. Formed by the members of various hardcore punk bands, the band blends the genre with other styles like post-punk, indie rock and baggy. They have released three studio albums and four EPs.

== History ==
=== Beginnings and No Sense No Feeling (2016–2020) ===
Vocalist Graham Sayle grew up in New Brighton, Merseyside, moving to London at nineteen to study at Goldsmiths, University of London. There, he became involved in the city's hardcore punk scene, forming the bands Dirty Money with Burscough native Rob Moss, then Tremors with Moss and Edward "Ski" Harper. After Tremors disbanded in 2012, Harper began writing music influenced by post-punk. This culminated in the 2016 formation of High Vis, with a lineup rounded out by Sayle, Moss and guitarists Romain Bruneau and Rob Hammarén. The band took its name from the colloquial abbreviation of high-visibility clothing, with Sayle explaining in an interview with NME that "It is the unifying clothing item of the working class. And it also just alienates you completely if you put a high-vis on, nobody wants to see you or speak to you unless they want something."

At the beginning of 2017, the band released the EPs I and II, then on 7 December 2017, the band released their third EP III. Their debut album No Sense No Feeling was released on 7 December 2019, however only a few months later the COVID-19 lockdowns began, leaving the band unable to perform. Around this time, Bruneau departed from the band to move back to Paris, leading to the band hiring Martin MacNamara. In the following months, Sayle and Harper entered the studio, culminating in the release of the Society Exists EP (2020).

=== Blending (2020–2023) ===
On 15 April 2022, the band released the single "Talk For Hours". On 4 June 2022, they announced the release of their second album Blending for 9 September, which would feature "Talk For Hours", and released the single "Fever Dream". On 15 September, they released the single "0151". On 24 January 2023, they released a music for the album's song "Trauma Bonds". Between 1 and 15 April 2023, they embarked on a headline tour of the United States and Canada, followed by another tour of the country from 28 July to 23 August, which featured both headline dates and festival appearances including Sound and Fury, Riot Fest and Furnace Fest. In the summer of 2023, they band performed at both Outbreak Festival, 2000 Trees festival, as well as at Reading and Leeds Festivals. Between 15 and 28 October 2023, they headlined European tour.

The band released the one-off single "Forgot To Grow" on 25 October 2023, which was included in a compilation of Dais Records tracks DAIS223.

=== Guided Tour (2024–present) ===
On 11 June 2024, they released the single "Mob DLA". This was followed by the announcement of their third album Guided Tour, released on 18 October 2024. The second single released was the house and garage influenced "Mind's A Lie". This was followed in September 2024 by the single "Drop Me Out" The album was later included in lists of the best albums of 2024 by publications such as Kerrang!, Stereogum and BrooklynVegan.

In September 2024 the band contributed to the song "Stomach" from the Corpus II Ep 2 by New York band Show Me the Body. They were set to tour the US and Canada with Militarie Gun, but had to cancel the tour when Sayle required emergency surgery.

In June 2025, it was announced the band would support Turnstile on the European dates of the Never Enough Tour starting in September 2025, and ending in January 2026. In November 2025 they filmed a five song set of Seattle-based radio station KEXP-FM, which was released on YouTube.

== Musical style and influences ==
Their music has been categorised by critics as hardcore punk, indie rock, post-punk and post-hardcore, incorporating elements of Britpop, oi!, house music, dance music, gothic rock, punk rock, baggy, psychedelic music, shoegaze and Madchester.

Their music makes use of jangly guitar and hardcore style drum playing. Sayle's vocals are often more similar to hardcore's shouted vocals than standard singing, while also emphasising his scouse accent. The band's lyrics early on were angry and expressed hopelessness, while later on often discuss pushing through a traumatic upbringing to better oneself. In a 2023 interview, Sayle reflected that since 2020, "A lot of the subject matter [of his lyrics became] just things that I was kind of reflecting on in therapy", also stating in a Paste magazine article he believes "It's really easy to hide behind anger if you play in a hardcore band... That’s easy. Standing there, just having a microphone and singing is hard". Class struggle is also a common theme in their lyrics, as are references to the singer's Merseyside upbringing, such as the song "0151" named for the county's dialling code.

In an article for Stereogum, writer Will Richards called their music "For hardcore fans wanting something a little sweeter or indie fans after some crunch or grit". Revolver writer Eli Enis likened them to "what the Stone Roses would sound like if they were on Dischord Records". Rolling Stone writer Sophie Porter said they merge the "tightly wound energy and seething passion of hardcore, softened (albeit slightly) with a post-punk maturity and a dash of Britpop idealism". Brooklyn Vegan said of Blending "the band really found their sound, dropping a pin in mid-’90s Manchester, part Happy Mondays, part Oasis, and more than a little of the Verve's stadium atmospherics in there too, all filtered through their hard-charging, aggressive past." Loud and Quiet writer Dominic Haley described their sound as "a frankly out-there melding of Judge style Youth Crew, Sisters of Mercy-like goth and '90s Britpop".

They have cited influences including Gang of Four, the Stone Roses, the Cure, Bauhaus, Wipers, the U.K. Subs, Chromatics, Hüsker Dü, the Chameleons and the Sound.

== Members ==
- Graham Sayle – vocals (2016–present)
- Rob Hammeren – guitar (2016–present)
- Edward "Ski" Harper – drums (2016–present)
- Martin MacNamara – guitar (2018–present)
- Jack Muncaster – bass (2024–present)

Former

- Gal Oren – bass (2016–2017)
- Romain Bruneau – guitar (2016–2018)
- Rob Moss – bass (2017–2024)

== Discography ==
Albums

- No Sense No Feeling (2019)
- Blending (2022)
- Guided Tour (2024)

EPs

- I (2017)
- II (2017)
- III (2017)
- Society Exists (2020)

Singles

- "Walking Wires" (2019)
- "Talk For Hours" (2022)
- "Fever Dream" (2022)
- "Forgot to Grow" (2023)
- "Mob DLA" (2024)
- "Mind's a Lie" (2024)
- "Stomach" (Show Me the Body featuring High Vis) (2024)
- "Drop Me Out" (2024)
