= Conspiracy of Beards =

American a cappella male choir

- Origin: San Francisco, California, United States
- Genres: A cappella Cover band Choir
- Years active: 2003–present
- Label: Out of Round (U.S.)
- Website: www.conspiracyofbeards.com

Conspiracy of Beards, based in San Francisco, California, is a 30+/- member a cappella male choir performing exclusively the songs of Leonard Cohen. Inspired by late artist Peter Kadyk and directed by Daryl Henline, the group performs gritty, original arrangements of Cohen's songs.

Started in June 2003 by Daryl Henline and Patrick Kadyk, the group has performed to audiences around the San Francisco Bay Area including the San Francisco Museum of Modern Art, Cafe du Nord and the Great American Music Hall. The choir has also been featured on Neighborhood Public Radio's West Coast Live, on KFOG-FM, on Public Broadcasting Service (PBS) Public television station KQED (TV), on KQED-FM The California Report, and on National Public Radio (NPR) Weekend Edition. In March 2008 the choir released a recording to coincide with their performance tour in New York City. In 2011 Conspiracy of Beards had the honor of performing at the Hardly Strictly Bluegrass Festival. In 2012 they sang to sold-out crowds at the Highline Ballroom, Jack Hanley Gallery, and Glasslands Gallery on their New York tour. In June 2012 Conspiracy of Beards embarked on Pacific Northwest bus tour and performed their first international show in Vancouver Canada. The 2022/2023 season brings the choir's 20th anniversary.

== Discography ==
=== Albums ===
- Conspiracy of Beards (2008)

=== DVDs ===
- A Midnight Choir (2012)
