= Art Murmur =

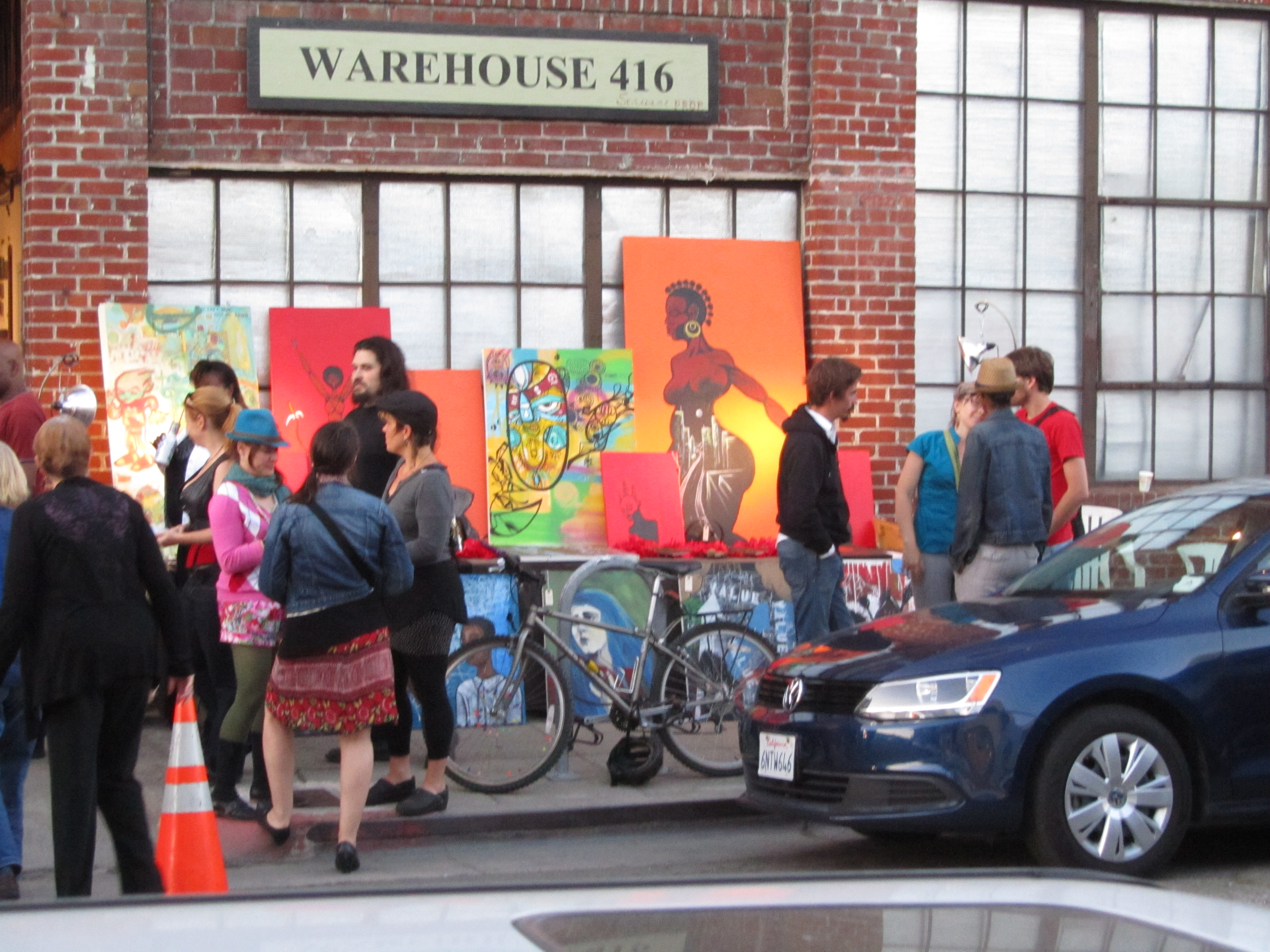
Art Murmur street scene in 2012.

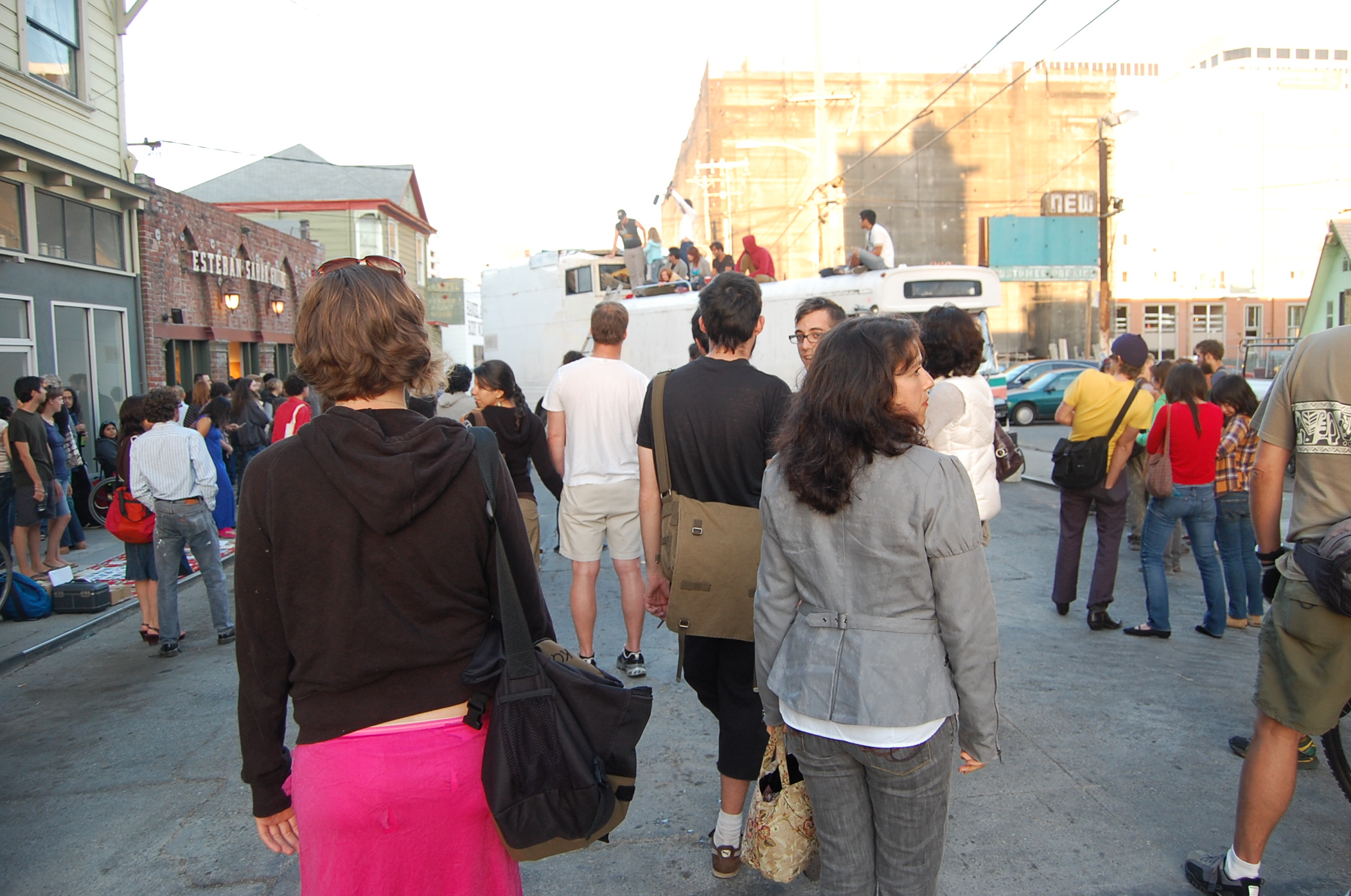
Art Murmur street scene in 2007.

Art Murmur is a collection of visual arts experiences designed to expose and promote Oakland's art scene. Primarily known for the First Friday Art Walk each month mostly held in the Uptown, Koreatown/Northgate, and downtown neighborhoods of Oakland, California, Oakland Art Murmur, a non-profit organization, draws thousands of people to visual art venues across all of Oakland. The event began in 2006 at the intersection of 23rd Street and Telegraph Avenue. In 2012, the street festival component was taken over by KONO, a neighborhood community group, becoming the "Oakland First Fridays Festival″ along Telegraph Avenue. One organization became two, though they remain closely aligned as cultural partners. Oakland Art Murmur is focused on connecting the public to Oakland's visual art, through programming such as the weekly Saturday Stroll art walk, different walking tours to inspire and educate participants about art, and the First Friday Art Walk. Since 2023, Oakland Art Murmur has been the steward of East Bay Open Studios, a long-running, twice-annual regional event that invites the public into the studios of visual artists across the East Bay.

== See also ==
- Ghost Ship warehouse fire
- 25th Street Collective
