= Ghost Ship warehouse fire =

2016 California underground warehouse party inferno

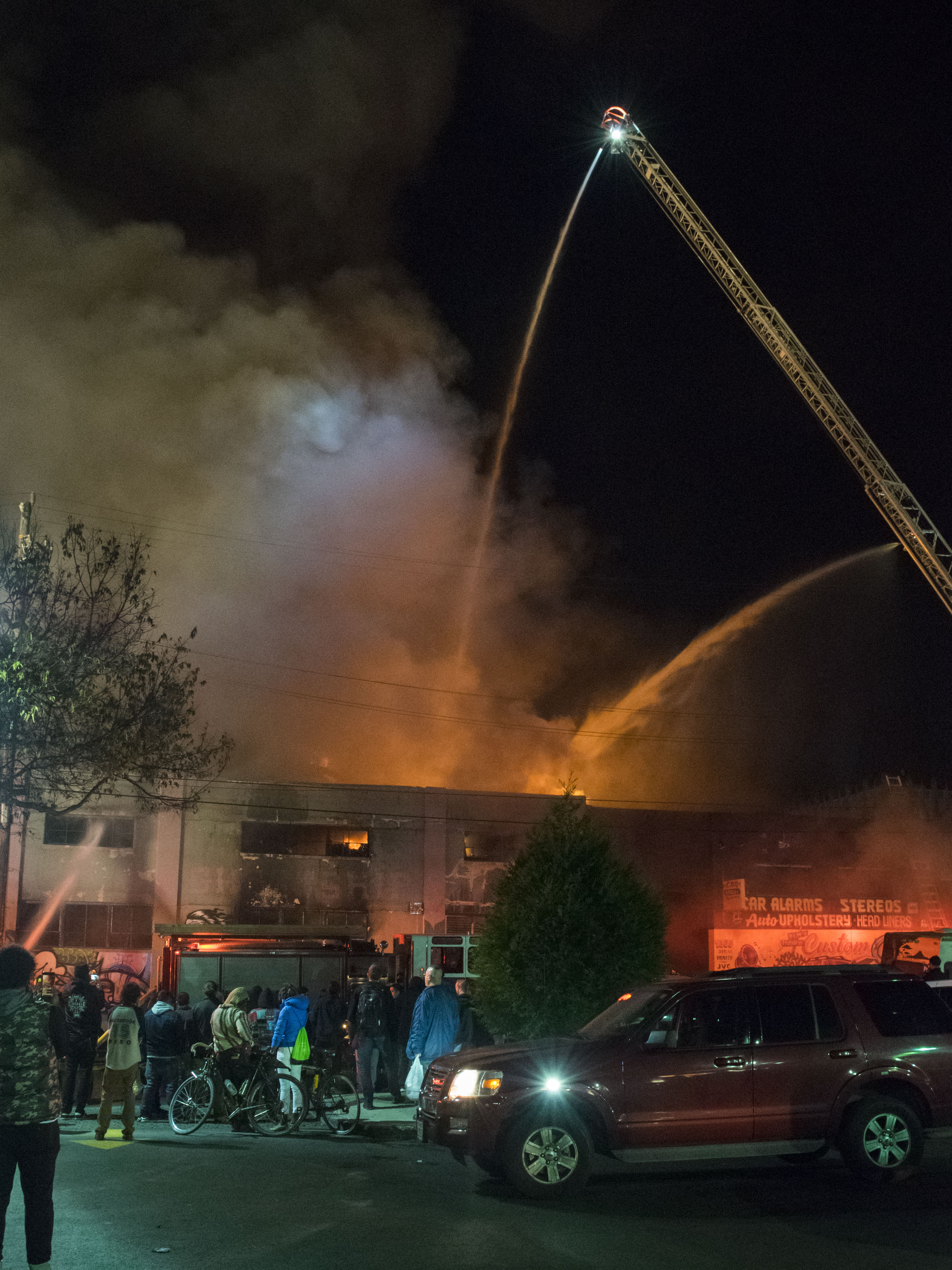
- Date: December 2, 2016; 9 years ago
- Time: 11:20 p.m. (PST)
- Venue: Ghost Ship
- Location: 1305 31st Avenue Oakland, California, U.S.; 37.7777°N 122.2271°W
- Type: Fire
- Cause: Unknown, possibly electrical failure
- Deaths: 36
- Injuries: 2
- Accused: Derick Almena, Max Harris
- Charges: 36 counts of involuntary manslaughter
- Trial: April 30, 2019 – July 31, 2019
- Verdict: Almena – guilty Harris – acquitted

On December 2, 2016, at about 11:20 p.m. PST, a fire started in a former warehouse that had been unlawfully converted into an artist collective with living spaces (named the Ghost Ship) in Oakland, California, which was hosting a concert with 80–100 attendees. The building, located in the Fruitvale neighborhood, was zoned for only industrial purposes; residential and entertainment uses were prohibited. The blaze killed 36 people, making it the deadliest fire in the history of Oakland. It was also the deadliest building fire in the United States since The Station nightclub fire in 2003, the deadliest in California since the 1906 San Francisco earthquake and the deadliest mass-casualty event in Oakland since the 1989 Loma Prieta earthquake.

Master tenant Derick Almena lived on the premises with his wife and three children, and sub-let the first floor to about 20 other residents who were instructed not to divulge that they lived there. In Almena's lease for the building, he did not say that it would be used as a residence, and on two occasions he told police that nobody lived in the building. The Alameda County district attorney's office launched an investigation into the fire's causes, and in 2017 charged Almena and his assistant Max Harris with felony involuntary manslaughter. In 2018, both pleaded no contest to 36 counts of involuntary manslaughter in a plea bargain with prosecutors, but the judge overseeing the case discarded the plea deals and the men were tried in court, facing as many as 36 years in prison.

On September 4, 2019, the jury deadlocked 10–2 for conviction on the 36 counts of manslaughter against Almena, resulting in a mistrial, while Harris was acquitted on all 36 counts. In 2021, Almena pled guilty to the 36 counts and was sentenced to 12 years in prison and released for time served.

In July 2020, the city of Oakland settled a civil lawsuit for the victims and agreed to pay $33 million: $9 million to one person who survived with lifelong injuries and $24 million to the families of the 36 who were killed in the fire. In August 2020, Pacific Gas and Electric Company settled a civil lawsuit for 32 of the victims for an undisclosed amount.

== Background ==
=== Building ===
The 9,880-square-foot (918 m^{2}) 160-by-48-foot (49 by 15 m) cement-block warehouse was constructed in 1930. The property was purchased in 1988 by Chor Ng, who is linked to 17 other properties in the San Francisco Bay Area. Ng also owned a body shop, cell phone store, and other businesses nearby. The autobody shop and the cell-phone store shared their electrical supply with the Ghost Ship. One former resident reported that the building's electrical system was entirely dependent on extension cords, and she was so concerned about safety that she would sleep in her car.

=== Ownership and management ===
Ng leased the property to Derick Almena and Nicholas Bouchard in 2013. They stated in the lease agreement that the property would be used as an artist collective "to build and create theatrical sets and offer workshops for community outreach." Almena named the building the Ghost Ship. He lived on the second floor with his wife and three children. He illegally sublet space on the first floor, charging about 25 resident artists rent ranging between $300 and $600 per month. The monthly rate for a one-bedroom apartment in Oakland at the time typically exceeded $2,000.

Almena instructed resident members of the collective, informally called Satya Yuga, to tell others that the warehouse was a 24-hour art studio and to not divulge that they lived there. In 2014 or 2015, Almena told police that no one lived in the building, and he repeated the same statement several months before the fire. A former tenant claimed that Almena used the tenants' rent to cover the warehouse rent and used proceeds from the parties to pay his living expenses.

=== Makeshift spaces ===
Use of the warehouse building for housing and entertainment was illegal. Living spaces on the first floor were connected by makeshift hallways constructed of "aggregates of salvaged and scavenged materials, such as pianos, organs, windows, wood benches, lumber, and innumerable other items stacked next to and on top of each other." The live-work spaces were separated by objects such as "wooden studs, steel beams, doors, window frames, bed frames, railings, pianos, benches, chairs, intact motorhomes and trailers, portions of trailers, corrugated metal sheeting, tapestries, plywood, sculptures, tree stumps and tree limbs."

Almena said that he and his family slept in the warehouse. Residents and others verified that the family lived on the second floor and that Almena rented space to as many as 18 others who lived in recreational vehicles (RVs) and makeshift rooms on the first floor. One longtime resident of the warehouse described the building as "a whole maze to get through," filled with wooden objects. He moved away because it was "too sketchy to continue to stay there." One victim of the fire was a building resident.

=== Known problems ===
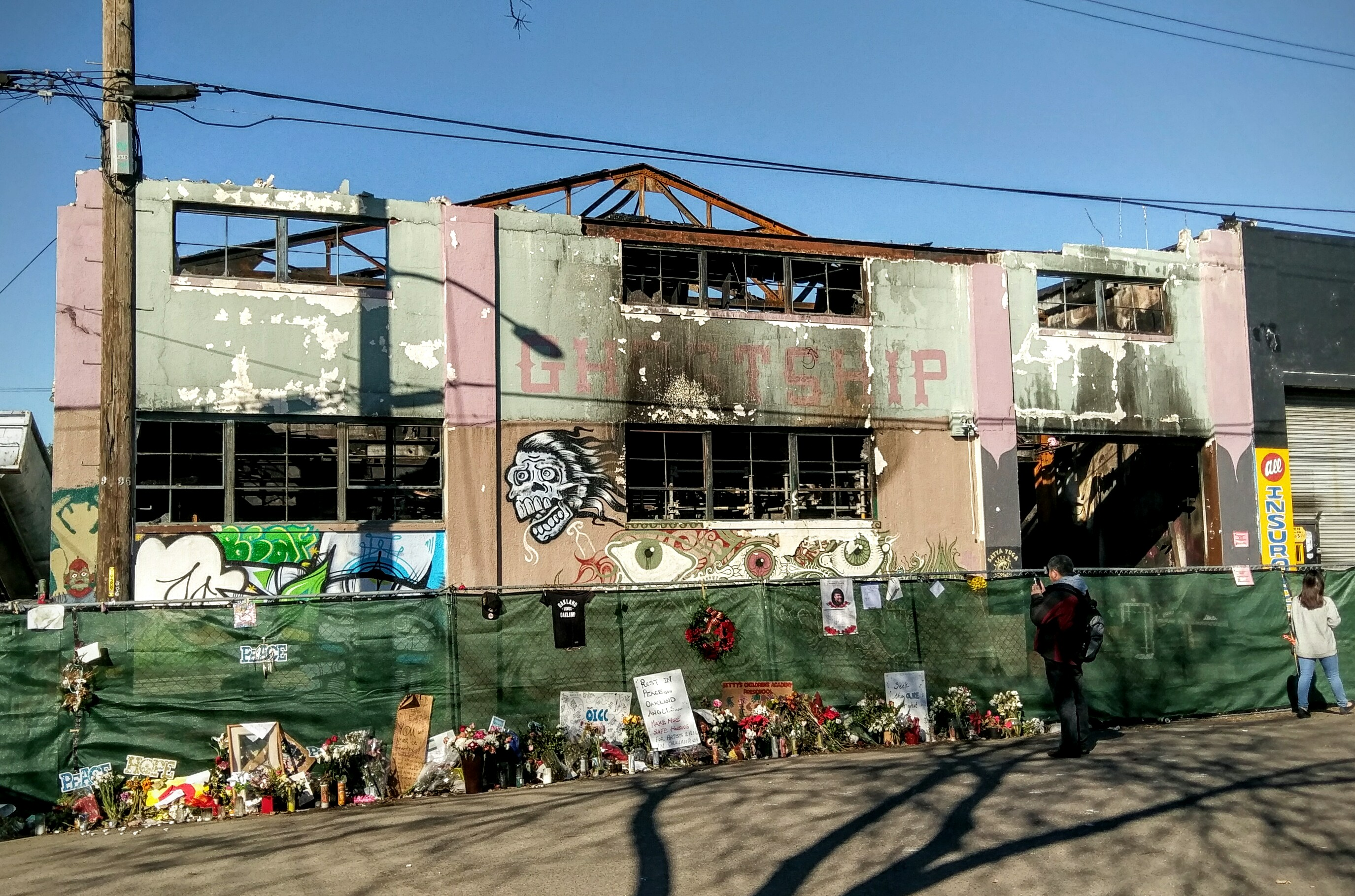
Ghost Ship warehouse 20 days after the fire

The city had received 10 complaints about the property since 1998, including formal complaints about hazardous garbage and construction debris around the building. The Oakland Planning and Building Department opened an investigation on November 13, 2016 based on a complaint about "blight" and "illegal interior construction." City building inspectors visited the warehouse on November 17, confirming the report of blight, but when no one answered the door, were unable to enter to investigate the report of illegal construction.

Inspectors are required to obtain permission from owners to gain entry; when permission is not granted, they must obtain a court order. A spokesperson for the Planning and Building Department stated that promoters of events such as the December 2 concert are required to obtain a special permit, but none had been issued. The city of Oakland's planning director revealed that the building had not been inspected for three decades.

Although police and fire officials warned that the warehouse was a fire hazard, Almena was reported to have ignored these concerns. The vice president of the local firefighters' union said that the fire marshal's office had been understaffed for years and felt that a proper fire inspection "would have shut the place down." On December 13, the Oakland fire chief said that "there were no indications this was an active business," that there were no department records of complaints about the building and that the department "inspects businesses, not buildings."

=== Electrical problems ===
Max Harris, creative director of the artist collective, claimed that the collective had reported electrical problems to Almena. The Mercury News reported that Almena had complained in early 2015 to the building owner's son Kai Ng that electricity in the building used "ancient and violated lines of distribution" that were "in dire need of a total and immediate upgrade". Ng's email reply argued that the "lack of electrical infrastructure" was clearly communicated to Almena when the lease was signed.

Following a 2014 small fire in the autobody shop, entrepreneur Ben Cannon reported to Ng that the fire was caused by a "catastrophically overloading" power system and replaced a burnt transformer with a cheaper one. In an email Cannon told Ng that "we are going to use it a little bit differently than standard." In response to a 2018 civil suit brought against the Ngs by the victims' families, the Ngs denied being "negligent or careless" and blamed Cannon for the Ghost Ship fire, claiming that he had misrepresented himself as a licensed electrician. When Cannon was asked in a deposition whether or not he had been present in the warehouse and if he had a contractor's license to perform the work, he refused to answer.

An attorney representing victims' families stated: "They were on notice that there was [sic] problems with the electricity."

== Fire ==
On the night of December 2, Harris hosted an electronic-music concert featuring performers from house music record label 100% Silk and other independent musicians. Between 80 and 100 people attended the event. Almena's wife and daughters stayed at a hotel so that the girls could sleep.

Several residents attempted to extinguish the initial fire using fire extinguishers before waves of fire exploded across the ceiling, igniting everything that they touched. Nearly all of the residents not attending the concert were able to escape in time, and one attested that only five seconds after he saw fire, the building "exploded into an inferno" with smoke so intense that he and three others could only yell "Fire!" before escaping.

The fire spread extremely quickly and generated heavy, deadly smoke. Several factors prevented visitors on the second floor from learning of the fire and impeded their escape. Most importantly, there were no fire alarms, fire sprinklers or smoke alarms in the building. Once the fire was detected, the stairwells and their position relative to exits, the makeshift construction and the huge fuel load created by the furnishings created conditions in which the occupants had very little time to escape.

There were two stairways, one in the back and an improvised one near the front. The rear stairway was concealed behind the stage and furnishings. The front stairway was made from a pile of stacked wooden pallets that several people on the second floor used in order to escape. They crawled along the floor to avoid the dense smoke filling the building, and once on the first floor, they struggled to find the front door because of the complicated layout and the many obstacles blocking the passages.

The building was cluttered with wooden furniture, pianos, art and mannequins. Wooden doors and pallets were used to separate the many small living spaces. Oakland Fire Department chief Teresa Deloach Reed told reporters: "It was like a maze almost."

Firefighters extinguishing fire on December 3, 2016

The first firefighters from Engine 13, stationed within two blocks of the Ghost Ship, reached the warehouse at 11:27 p.m., less than three minutes after the first 9-1-1 call. Their only access was a single-person door that had been cut through a commercial steel rollup door. One company pushed inside on their hands and knees, trying to stay under the smoke, with about 50 feet of hose. The smoke conditions offered almost no visibility and the firefighters frequently collided with unseen obstacles. They could only advance in a zig-zag pattern about 20 feet (7 m) into the building. Another company entered but they too could only advance about 25 feet (8 m).

Chief James Bowron learned that as many as 60 people might still be inside, but given the intensity of the fire and smoke, he believed that no survivors would be found during the firefighters' initial entry into the building. Concerned about the spread of fire to nearby buildings, Bowron called a second alarm at 11:31 and a third alarm seven minutes after that.

The pallet stairway was initially reported as the building's only stairs, but once the pallet stairs caught fire, they were instantly incinerated. Any people on the second floor who may have still been alive could not reach the ground. No firefighter ever located the pallet staircase, although neither stairway actually led directly to one of the two exits.

About 22 minutes after the firefighters' arrival, the fire suddenly illuminated the night sky with four companies of firefighters inside. When the firefighters told Bowron that the second floor was almost completely engulfed in flames, he feared for their safety and ordered them to withdraw. They fought a "surround and drown" exterior defensive operation from that point forward. Seven minutes later, the fire began "blowtorching" out the roof.

Most of the second floor collapsed soon afterward, and later the wood-clad steel-beam roof collapsed as well. It took 52 firefighters using 14 pieces of apparatus until 4:36 a.m. to declare the fire under control. The firefighters who had been on scene all night were upset they had not rescued a single person and that many had likely died.

=== Recovery ===
The next day, the fire department's search-and-rescue personnel began to stabilize the structure before they could search for victims. They deployed drone aircraft using thermal imaging that unsuccessfully searched for survivors. Investigators removed debris slowly and carefully, and the last human remains were not recovered until three days had passed. All but one of those killed were visitors to the warehouse. Seven victims were found on the remaining portion of the second floor, trapped by smoke and the missing stairway of wooden pallets that had burned. The other 29 victims were found on the first floor, one within feet of the side exit. Some of the victims were found huddled together, some unburned, under the collapsed second floor.

=== Fire origins ===
An early report blamed the fire on a faulty refrigerator, but agents from the federal Bureau of Alcohol, Tobacco, Firearms and Explosives (BATFE) rejected this cause. However, agents could not discount the possibility that another electrical appliance or component started the fire.

Investigators found "something screwed, welded, tacked, hammered or nailed to every square inch" of the building. According to Bowron, "the fuel load inside was nothing short of incredible." Fire operations chief Mark Hoffman described the first floor as a "labyrinth."

On June 19, 2017, the Oakland Fire Department, BATFE, and the Alameda County Arson Task Force issued a 50-page report providing new details on the fire and subsequent recovery efforts. The report confirmed that all victims had died from smoke inhalation, the most common cause of fire fatalities, as had been previously reported. Investigators concluded that the fire began in the northwest area of the ground floor and documented extensive damage to the electrical system, but they were unable to pinpoint the precise cause because of the extent of the fire. The report also documented why it had taken several days to remove the bodies, as investigators were forced to slowly sift through the cluttered debris of the collapsed interior.

== Fatalities ==
The 36 people who died in the fire ranged in age from 17 to 61, with the vast majority being local Bay Area residents, with one resident from Finland. Several were students or recent graduates of University of California, Berkeley. A number were musicians and artists, including musicians Cherushii and Cash Askew of Them Are Us Too.

== Legal aftermath ==
=== Criminal investigation ===
The Alameda County district attorney's office launched a criminal investigation on December 4. An arson investigation was also launched. Oakland mayor Libby Schaaf announced that charges against anyone found responsible could range from involuntary manslaughter to murder.

In public remarks on January 23, 2017, Almena's lawyers claimed that the fire originated in a building adjacent to the warehouse and that he should not be held responsible. A report about the investigation published on February 8, 2017 stated that investigators were unable to find an origin, noting that the investigation was ongoing and that the electrical system was under analysis.

On March 14, 2017, Oakland Fire Department chief Teresa Deloach Reed retired amidst questions about inspection procedures and management. The Alameda County lead prosecutor in charge of the investigation had been requesting the fire department's report for several weeks when he finally received a copy on March 17. Its contents were not released to the public. On March 21, 2017, a judge ruled that debris from the fire must be preserved as potential evidence in pending lawsuits.

=== Prosecution ===
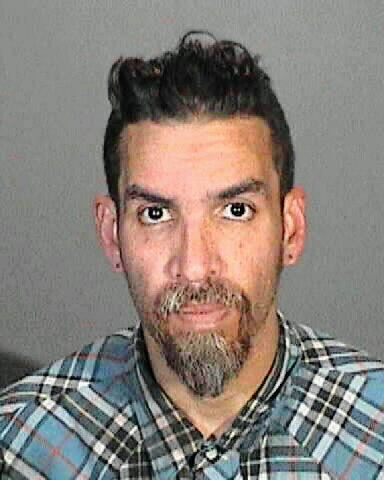
Derick Almena

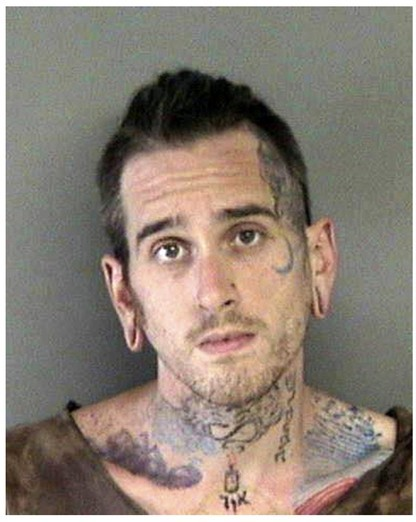
Max Harris

On June 5, 2017, Almena and Harris were both arrested in California, respectively in Lake County and Los Angeles County. Alameda County District Attorney Nancy O'Malley announced the men could face up to 39 years in prison.

On July 3, 2018, Almena and Harris each pled no contest to 36 counts of involuntary manslaughter. According to their agreement, Almena was to be sentenced to nine years in prison and Harris to six. Some family members of those who died testified and protested the plea deal. Sentencing was set for August 9, 2018, but the following day, the judge rejected the plea deals, stating that Almena failed to accept "full responsibility and remorse." The judge said that he would have accepted the plea deal for Harris because Harris showed remorse, but the deal had been made with both Almena and Harris.

During the preliminary hearings, building owner Chor Ng was questioned but invoked her Fifth Amendment right to avoid testifying and possibly incriminating herself. Ng was among a number of parties that were sued by victims' relatives. Witnesses described the Ghost Ship warehouse as a "death trap."

Almena and Harris faced penalties ranging from probation to 36 years in prison if a jury trial resulted in a guilty verdict for criminal negligence. Pending trial, Almena and Harris remained in jail, unable to pay $750,000 in bail. Almena's attorney Tony Serra and Harris' attorney Curtis Briggs both said that much of their defense would involve diverting blame to others.

The trial began on April 2, 2019. Prosecution witnesses testified about the history of violations found over the years. Almena contradicted their statements, accusing the city, police and fire officials of lying. During his testimony, he claimed that a building inspector, a child protective services agent, six members of the fire department and three police officers had visited the building several times on social occasions and never mentioned any violations. Almena blamed the landlord for tricking him into renting a building that lacked adequate plumbing or electricity.

Almena's and Harris' attorneys claimed that the fire was a case of arson. They called a witness who claimed that she had overheard a group of unidentified men at a taco truck claiming credit for starting the fire. Former Oakland fire marshal Maria Sabatini, one of the principle investigators, testified that although investigators believed that the cause was probably an electrical failure, they found no evidence of arson but could not determine the source because the fire had destroyed possible telltale indicators.

Katleen Bouchard, the mother of Almena's fellow leaseholder Nicholas Bouchard, testified that she helped her son with research and plans to develop the artist collective and had met with her son, Almena, and his wife in 2013. She provided information about how they could obtain permits to upgrade the building and request grants to help defray the cost. She claimed that Almena "laughed at me" and replied that he would do things his own way. Nicholas Bouchard claimed to have become concerned about the modifications to the building that Almena had made, including a 20-by-20-foot (6.1 m × 6.1 m) hole in the second floor, and distanced himself from the project.

In bodycam footage played during the trial from a 2015 visit by police officer Moises Palanco to the building, he was heard saying: "It's a huge fireplace in here."

Prosecutors attempted to show that Almena failed to place smoke alarms, emergency exit signs and fire suppression systems in the building while filling the space with art projects, furniture, sculptures, windows, doors and salvaged and scavenged used items that made it difficult for the victims to find an exit. The prosecution showed that all of the victims died of smoke inhalation, not from burns.

Almena was asked during his testimony if he had obtained legal permits for the kitchen that he had installed, a side door, the plumbing, electrical work or the stairs in the front of the building. Almena said that he had "no permits for anything." He also said that he had failed to obtain operational permits for events because he did not know that they were required.

Harris testified that the title of executive director that he sometimes used was inflated and an attempt to "add authority to his emails to landlords and event planners." However, during his testimony, the prosecution showed that Harris communicated about rent with the landlords, negotiated terms and evictions with other tenants and was the primary contact for the group who presented the concert and party on the night of the fire.

The jury convened on July 31, 2019. On August 20, the judge replaced three of the jurors and the jury was required to restart deliberations. Two of the dismissed jurors were subject to contempt charges for allegedly violating the judge's rules about reading or talking to the media about the case. On the same day, the judge also dismissed two defense motions for a mistrial. On September 4, 2019, the deliberations ended when the jury deadlocked 10–2 for conviction on the 36 counts of manslaughter charges pending against Almena, resulting in a mistrial. Harris was acquitted on all 36 counts. Harris was released from jail while Almena remained behind bars.

At a hearing on October 4, 2019, the judge set a new trial date for Almena in March 2020. A defense motion requesting a reduction of his $750,000 bail was denied, and Almena remained in jail. On January 31, 2020, the trial was scheduled to begin in May, with jury selection to begin in early April. Because the statute of limitations period had passed for indictment of the Ngs, Almena's defense lawyers planned to call the Ngs as witnesses in Almena's next trial.

On January 22, 2021, Almena pled guilty to 36 charges of involuntary manslaughter (one for each person killed in the fire) as part of a plea deal by which he would serve between 9 and 12 years in prison. He was released on bail the previous May because of coronavirus concerns and posted a $150,000 bail bond.

On March 8, 2021, Almena was sentenced to 12 years in prison. With time served, he was expected to be able to serve his sentence in 18 months of home confinement while wearing an ankle monitor.

=== Civil lawsuits ===
Numerous lawsuits related to the fire were filed by 80 plaintiffs, naming 100% Silk, Pacific Gas and Electric Company, Ben Cannon, Derick Ion Almena, Max Harris, Chor Nar Siu Ng, the city of Oakland, Alameda County and the state of California, and were subsequently consolidated.

While a cause for the fire was never determined, on December 17, 2019, bankruptcy judge Dennis Montali allowed the plaintiffs' case claiming that the fire was caused by an electrical malfunction to continue against PG&E. If held liable, PG&E would be required to pay the plaintiffs from its $900 million of insurance money, although not from the $13.5 billion allotted for the claims arising from recent wildfires.

When questioned during the preliminary hearing, warehouse owner Chor Ng, her daughter and son all invoked the Fifth Amendment for each question.

In July 2020, the city of Oakland settled a civil lawsuit for the victims and agreed to pay a total of $33 million: $9 million to one person who survived with lifelong injuries and $24 million to the families of the 36 who were killed in the fire.

In August 2020, PG&E settled a civil lawsuit for 32 of the 36 who died. The amount of the settlement was undisclosed, but it was limited to the amount available under PG&E’s insurance coverage for 2016.

== Reactions ==
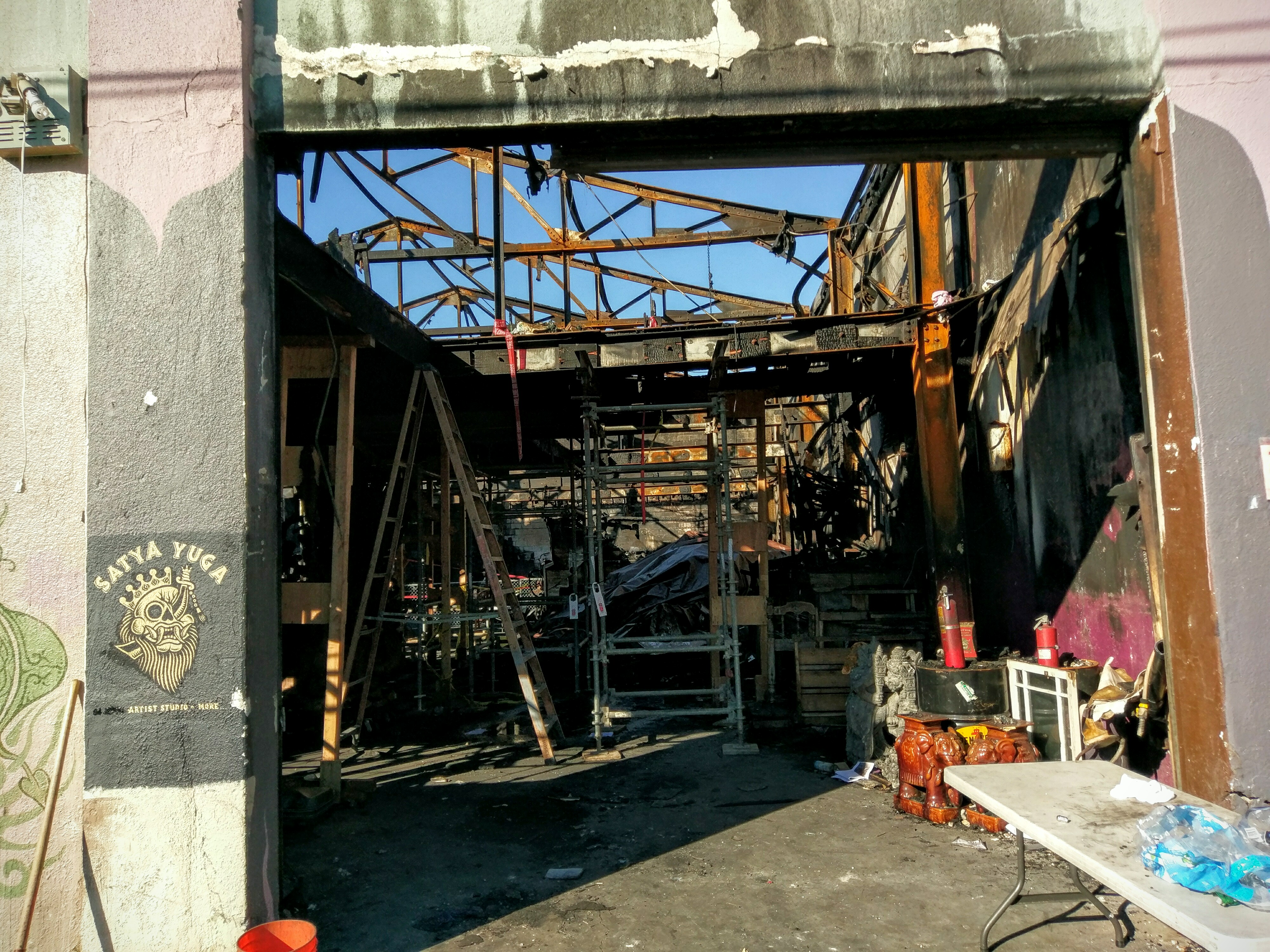
Ghost Ship warehouse interior, post fire

In an interview, Oakland City Council member Noel Gallo said that city officials "need to enforce the codes that we have" and that "we should have been more assertive in the past."

The Oakland Athletics baseball team offered to match donations for those affected, up to $30,000; the Oakland Raiders football team soon joined them. The Oakland-based Golden State Warriors basketball team announced a donation of $50,000 to the Fruitvale-based Unity Council. The Warriors announced an additional $75,000 donation to relief efforts on December 7, 2016. Warriors player Stephen Curry auctioned off two pairs of his shoes for $45,201 to benefit the Oakland Fire Relief fund. By December 9, 2016 the Gray Area Foundation for the Arts had raised over $550,000 and scheduled a benefit concert for December 14, 2016, featuring Bay Area musicians such as Primus, Tune-yards, and Boots Riley.

A Facebook Safety Check was deployed in early December 2016 to help people find the whereabouts of friends and family who might have been in attendance.

On December 3, 2016, the record label 100% Silk posted on their Facebook page: "What happened in Oakland is an unbelievable tragedy, a nightmare scenario. Britt and I are beside ourselves, utterly devastated. We are a very tight community of artists and we are all praying, sending love and condolences to everyone involved and their families."

Almena, who had not attended the party, posted a message on Facebook at around 1:30 a.m. for which he was soon criticized because he failed to mention the victims:

Confirmed. Everything I worked so hard for is gone. Blessed that my children and Micah were at a hotel safe and sound… it’s as if i have awoken from a dream filled with opulence and hope…. To be standing now in poverty of self worth.

Almena later said that at the time of the post, he was unaware that people had been killed. In a brief interview on December 5, he spoke of the families of the victims, saying, "They're my children. They're my friends, they're my family, they're my loves, they're my future." In another interview on December 6, Almena said he was "incredibly sorry" and defended himself against charges of profit-seeking, saying, "This is not profit, this is loss. This is a mass grave."

On the night of December 5, 2016, hundreds of people attended vigils in Oakland and San Francisco in honor of the victims. Local residents, including artists and tenants' rights activists, have cited the fire as a symptom of the San Francisco Bay Area's underlying housing crisis. City inspectors have voiced suspicions that dozens of live-work warehouses similar to Ghost Ship exist in Oakland. On December 6, 2016, Mayor Libby Schaaf announced $1.7 million in grant funding to create affordable spaces for artists and arts organizations. She announced a planned revival and expansion of a task force on Artist Housing and Work Spaces, and the creation of a fire safety task force.

On December 14, the Oakland United benefit concert was held at Fox Oakland Theatre, presented by Another Planet Entertainment, Noise Pop, and Paradigm Talent Agency. The concert raised about $300,000 for the Gray Area Foundation for the Arts' Arts Oakland Fire Relief Fund. One of the fire's victims, Cash Askew, was tributed by her Them Are Us Too bandmate Kennedy Ashlyn and Askew's girlfriend Anya Taylor who performed Jimmy Eat World's "Sweetness." Askew's stepfather Sunny Haire also performed alongside Careletta Sue Kay. Other performers included opening act Geographer, Dan Deacon, Tycho, Conspiracy of Beards, Rogue Wave, Fantastic Negrito, The Coup, Thao Nguyen, Hieroglyphics, and headliners Primus. Speakers included the Gray Area Foundation's Josette Melchor, Paradigm's Sam Hunt, and East Bay Express and Pitchfork writer Sam Lefebvre.

Comparisons were drawn between this fire and the 1990 Happy Land fire, a nightclub fire in New York City that claimed 87 lives. The Happy Land fire also involved controversial operations of the structure, and suffered from similar conditions including lack of emergency exits and poor maintenance. In June 2017, local artist Chris Edwards built a boat sculpture in memory of Ghost Ship and installed it in the nearby Emeryville harbor. People have used it as a place to visit and leave flowers.

== Legacy ==
=== Site ===
In 2023, the remains of the warehouse were razed and cleared. A non-profit organization called The Unity Council purchased the property, an adjacent empty lot, and an adjacent fire-damaged commercial building for approximately $2.6 million in total, and plans to build affordable housing there. The proceeds of the sale will be used to help settle associated lawsuits. As of May 2025, work has yet to start at the vacant lot.

=== Memorials ===
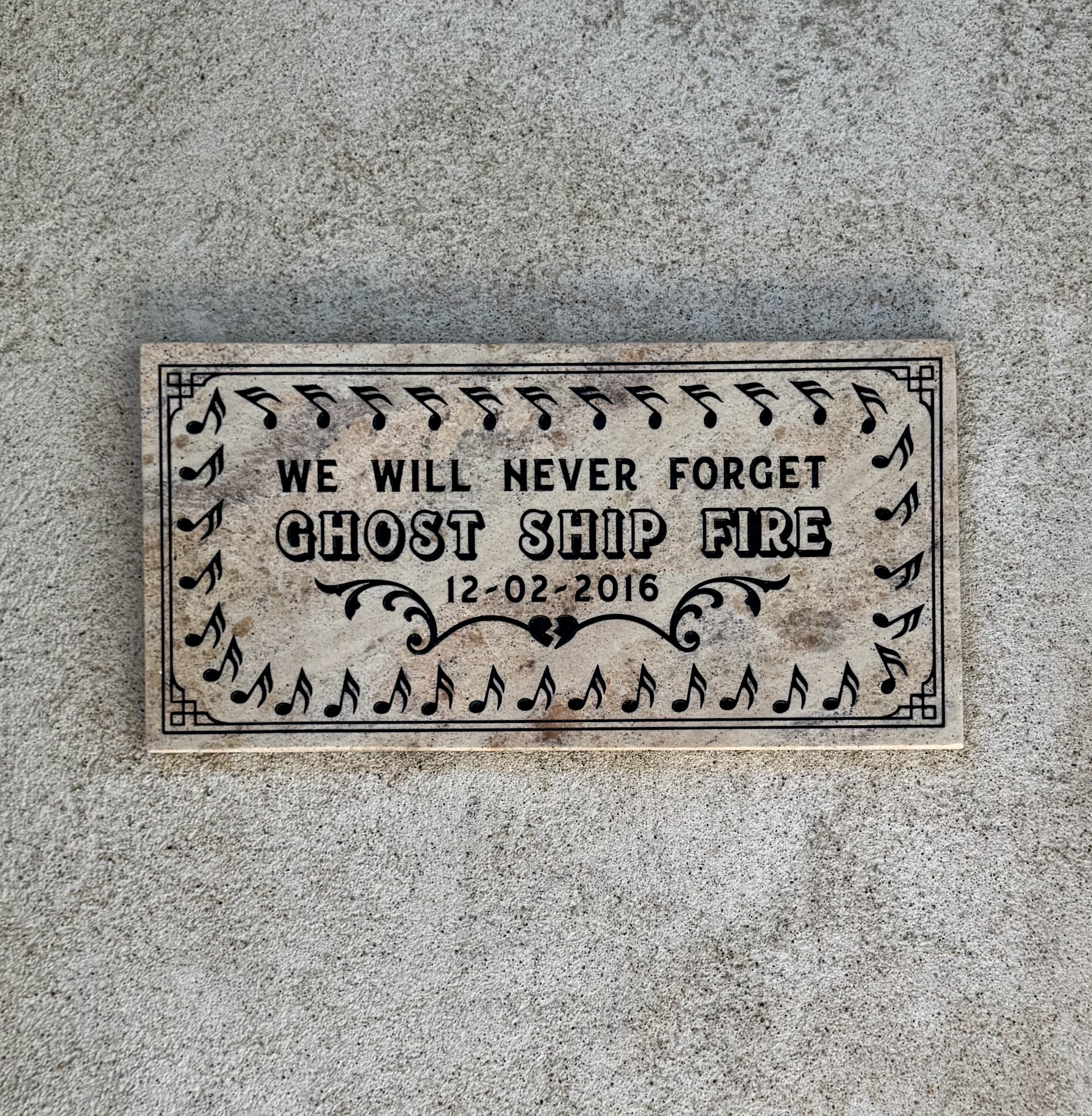
Memorial plaque at Chapel of the Chimes

In February 2017, an artist known as Vogue painted a Ghost Ship mural in honor of the 36 victims of the fire. The mural was made possible by Sage Loring of Fuming Guerilla Productions, who securing the funding, artist and location. The mural features a large sailing ship, a scroll with the names of the victims, and 36 white doves.

Also in 2017, Chris Edwards built a Ghost Ship as a tribute to the 36 lives lost to the fire. Defined as a guerilla art piece, it sits close to the Emeryville marina on the water.

Friends and family of Chelsea Faith and Travis Hough and members of the band Easystreet who were victims of the fire, formed a choir to complete an unreleased track by Faith and Hough.

== See also ==
- List of accidents and disasters by death toll
- List of disasters in the United States by death toll
- List of fires
- List of nightclub fires
- Denmark Place fire, 1980 London fire at an illegally operated nightclub that killed 37
- Oakland Art Murmur
- 25th Street Collective
- Onion (Shannon and the Clams album)
