= Youth Code =

American electronic music group

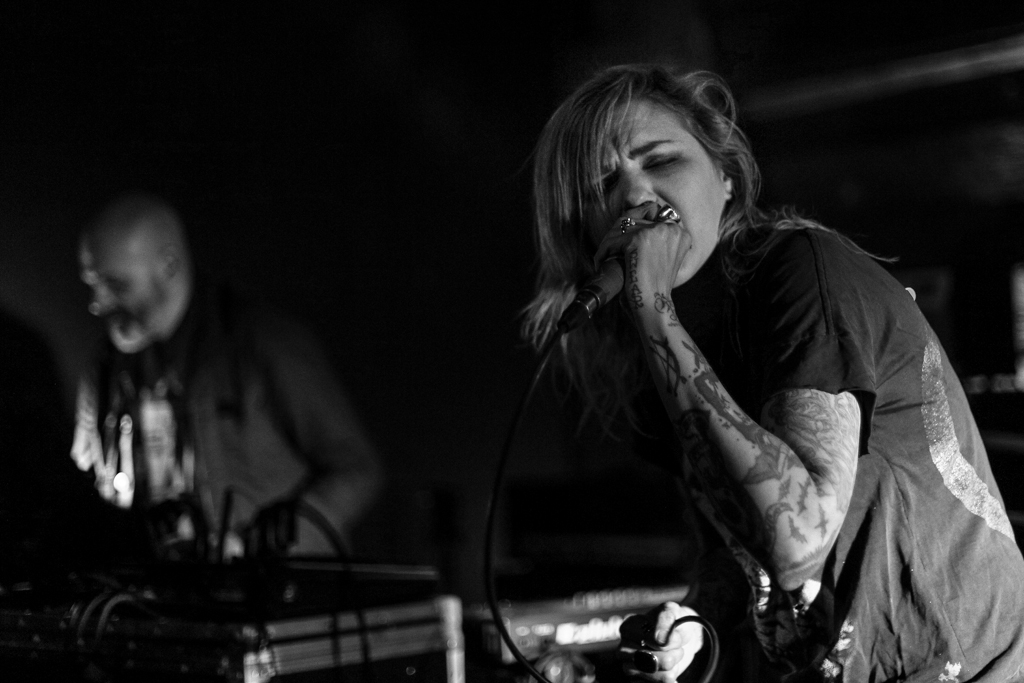
- Youth Code performing live in 2017

Background information
- Origin: Los Angeles, California, U.S.
- Genres: EBM; industrial; hardcore punk
- Years active: 2012–present
- Labels: Dais; Angry Love; Big Love; Sumerian Records
- Members: Sara Taylor; Ryan George
- Website: www.facebook.com/youthcodeforever

Youth Code is an American EBM duo, formed in 2012 by Sara Taylor and Ryan George in Los Angeles, California. The duo's musical style, following the model of early Wax Trax! Records, has been described as industrial music infused with "hardcore angst." Following their self-released Demonstrational Cassette in 2012 and a chance meeting with Psychic TV, Youth Code were invited to release their first single, "Keep Falling Apart", through Angry Love Productions (the label's first non-Psychic TV release). Since then, they have released two full-length studio albums, an EP, and two additional singles.

In 2013, Youth Code signed with Dais Records, releasing their self-titled debut and served as the opening act for groups such as AFI, Suicide Commando, and Nothing. The pair's music has drawn the attention of mainstream media outlets such as the Los Angeles Times and Pitchfork, as well as praise from major industrial acts such as Skinny Puppy and Front Line Assembly, who invited them on the Eye vs. Spy Tour in 2014. Youth Code opened for Skinny Puppy's Down the SocioPath Tour later in 2015 and have since continued to perform throughout the country. They released their second album, Commitment to Complications, in April 2016.

== History ==
=== Formation and early releases (2012-2013) ===
Ryan George had performed in a number of punk and hardcore bands for several years before meeting Sara Taylor, who had ten years experience working as tour manager for musical acts of various genres. Taylor had never previously performed in a band, but was taught how to play synthesizers by George. The pair started experimenting with various kinds of sounds until they created something that suited their liking. Vacation Vinyl, where Taylor had been working at the time, announced that there was to be a showcasing of music played by their employees; Taylor informed her manager that she and George would be performing under the name Youth Code. Following their debut performance, Youth Code released a demo tape called Demonstrational Cassette, which became well-circulated and highly sought after. The inside cover of the tape reads "We Were Never Supposed to be a Band", referring to the fact that Youth Code was only supposed to be a one-off gig.

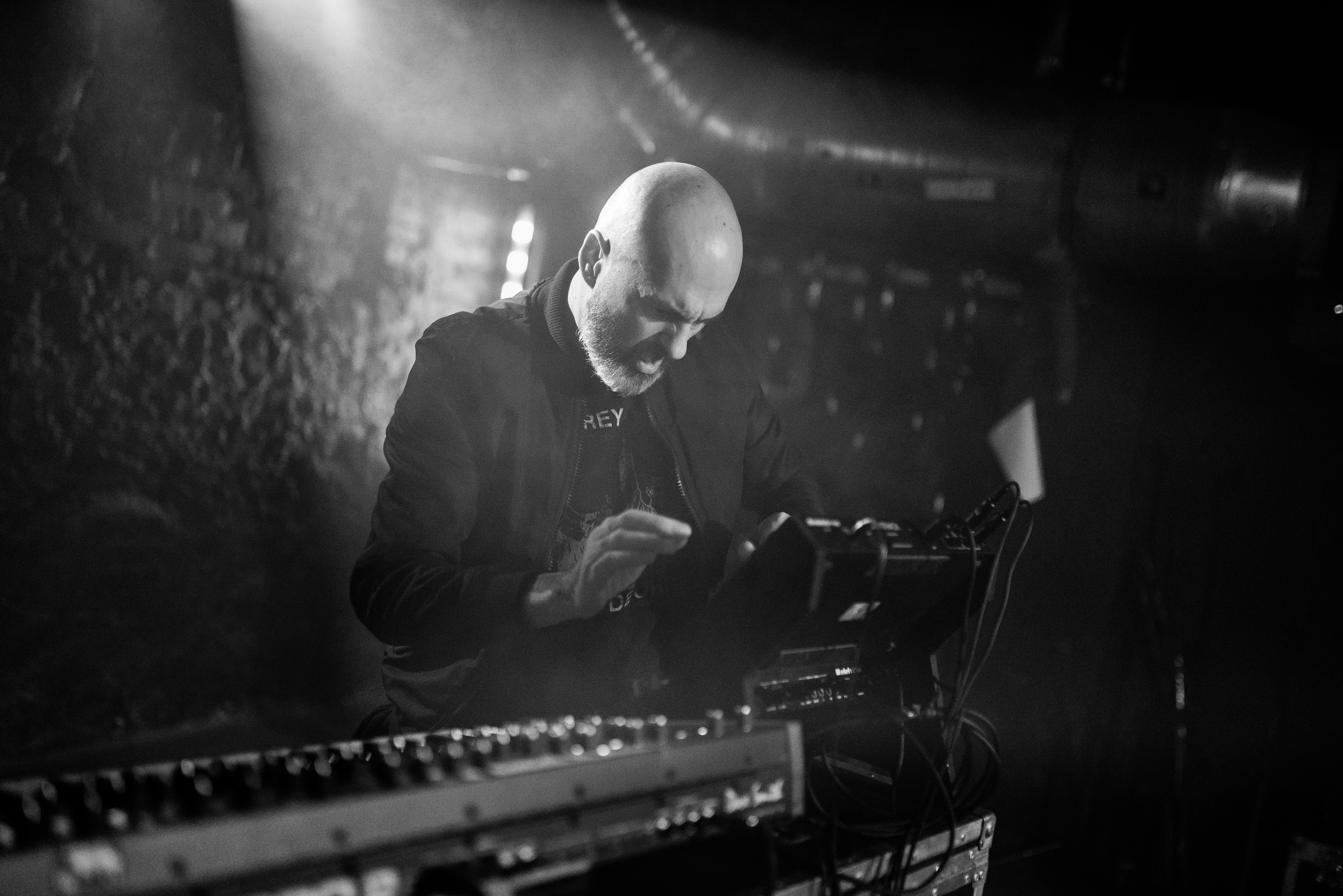
Ryan George performing live in April 2018

On the band's name, the pair have stated that they were originally going to make fake bands with Greh Holger, manager of the label Chondritic Sound. A split cassette was planned (though never released), in which Youth Code would play Nitzer Ebb-esque music, while Holger would perform music similar to that of Klinik and Clock DVA.

Taylor had met and befriended the band Psychic TV while working as a tour manager. The duo was invited to release their 7-inch single "Keep Falling Apart" through Psychic TV's personal label, Angry Love Productions. The single was a limited release and sold out rapidly. Youth Code released their self-titled studio debut in 2013 through Dais Records. The album's musical style was compared to those of prominent industrial music acts such as Front Line Assembly and Ministry. The album caught the attention of mainstream media outlets such as Pitchfork, who described Youth Code's debut as "hellish" and "uncompromising", but balanced. Three tracks from their demo tape were re-recorded for the album. A music video for the song "Carried Mask" was also produced.

=== A Place to Stand and the Eye vs. Spy tour (2014) ===
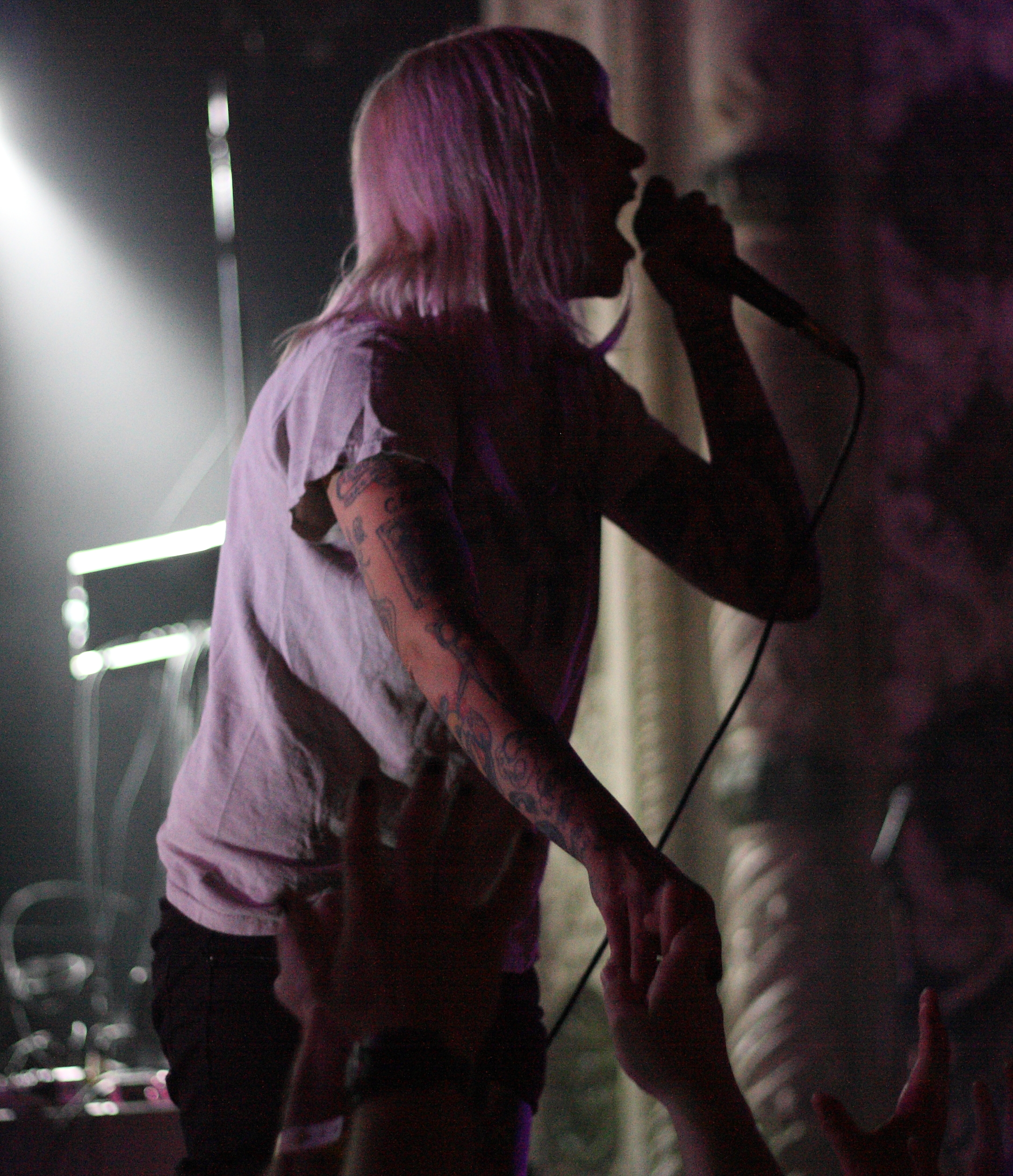
Sara Taylor performing live at the Metro Chicago in 2014

In late 2013, it was announced that Youth Code would open for alternative rock band AFI starting in January. The announcement came just a few months after a stint supporting Belgian electro-industrial act Suicide Commando. George described how they were so bewildered by the invitation that they could not refuse. The duo were not well received on stage, but stated that they generated more interest backstage, where they had conversations with mostly older members of the audience. George also noted that they "felt like missionaries" while performing with AFI, introducing industrial music to a younger generation. Youth Code also performed several dates in support of shoegazing groups Nothing and Whirr.

Youth Code released the EP A Place to Stand in late 2014; the album was produced by Joshua Eustis of Nine Inch Nails and Telefon Tel Aviv fame. The record's A side featured four brand new tracks, while the B side featured remixes of older material. Pitchfork described the release as "polished EBM" with some "pop sensibility", though noted that some of the lyrical content had a "soapbox" vibe. Rolling Stone placed the EP on their "15 Great Albums You Didn't Hear in 2014" list, stating that "the crash of collapsing buildings rarely sounds so constructive." One of the new songs, "Consuming Guilt", was released as a 7-inch single and was accompanied by a music video. Pitchfork's Andy O'Connor claimed that the song "slams harder than anything they've done" previously. A compilation album titled An Overture was also released, consisting of the duo's previous works.

Later in the year, it was revealed that Youth Code would be touring through the United States and Canada alongside industrial act Skinny Puppy for the Alliance of Sound Tour; also included in the lineup were British/Irish electronic group VNV Nation and German group Haujobb. However, VNV Nation dropped out of the lineup due to a "problematic situation" and was replaced by Front Line Assembly (who had previously done a remix of the song "No Animal Escapes" on the "Consuming Guilt" single); the tour was renamed the Eye vs. Spy Tour.

=== Commitment to Complications and touring (2015-present) ===
In 2015, Youth Code toured through Europe "selectively" on their own and in the United States with Skinny Puppy during the 17 date Down the SocioPath tour. In late 2015, the duo released the single "Anagnorisis", which was produced by Rhys Fulber. A special "clear smoke" edition was made available for purchase only during the Down the SocioPath tour. Youth Code released their second studio album, Commitment to Complications, in April 2016 to positive critical reception. Hans Rollman from PopMatters gave the album a positive review, proclaiming that "Youth Code haven’t reinvented industrial electronic music, but they’ve certainly reinvigorated it and upped the standard." Steven Gullotta of Brutal Resonance magazine stated that the album was an "endearing showcase of their [Youth Code's] love for not only industrial and EBM as a whole, but a wide array of rebellious and anti-everything attitudes." The album once more features Fulber's production, as well as guest appearances by Ben Falgoust of Goatwhore and Todd Jones from Nails. The duo went on tour in 2016 to support the new record.

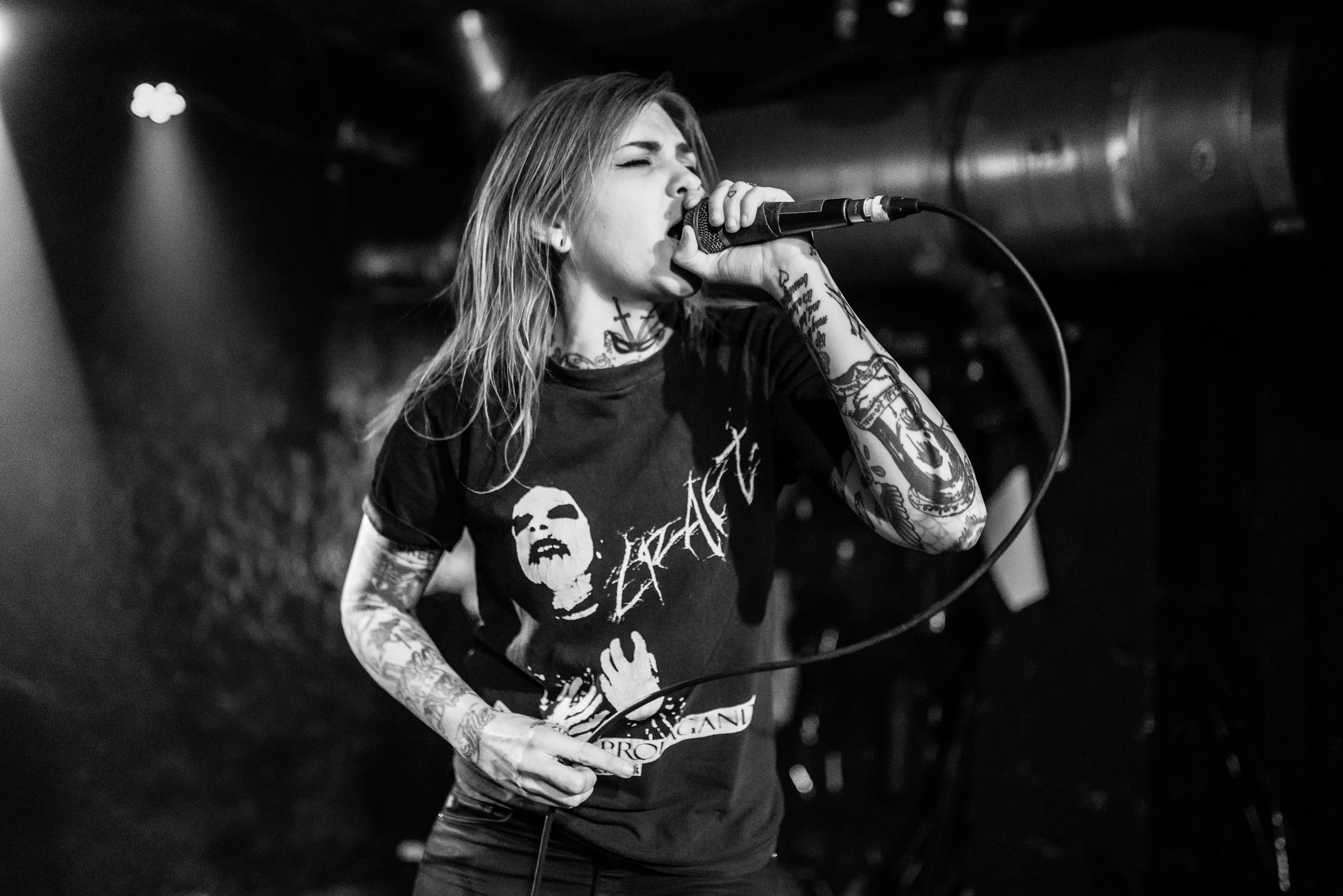
Sara Taylor performing live in April 2018

In April 2017, Chelsea Wolfe and Deafheaven vocalist George Clarke joined with Youth Code to release a remix of the song "Lost at Sea". All proceeds from the song were donated to Planned Parenthood. Later that year, Wolfe announced that Youth Code would be touring with her band to promote her album Hiss Spun. Youth Code embarked on their first Australian tour in April 2018 alongside the Melbourne-based industrial group Kollaps. They released the single "Innocence" in November 2018, a collaborative effort with the noise rock band Health, with whom they toured the following year.

Taylor joined Fred Sablan, Piggy D., and Alex Lopez of Suicide Silence in forming the punk group Heavens Blade, which released its first EP in October 2019. Youth Code took part in the Dia De Los Deftones festival in November 2019 alongside Gojira and Chvrches. In December, Taylor joined My Chemical Romance for their reunion show at the Shrine Exposition Hall in Los Angeles and performed the song "You Know What They Do to Guys Like Us in Prison".

The Swedish hardcore act Refused announced that Youth Code would be joining them on their 2020 North American tour.

On April 9, 2020, Youth Code released the single "Puzzle."

== Style and themes ==
Youth Code have been influenced by a number of different artists who occupy genres ranging from EBM/industrial to heavy metal. Some of these artists include Metallica, Nine Inch Nails, Marilyn Manson, Depeche Mode, Godflesh, Ministry, and Nitzer Ebb, among many others. Taylor has referred to Skinny Puppy's "Worlock" as "one of the most influential songs" she had ever heard, while George has described Bill Leeb from Front Line Assembly and Noise Unit as "one dude I look up to." Youth Code have also cited records by The Knife, OMD, Pet Shop Boys, Mika Vainio, Sophie, Dillinja, Aphex Twin, and Babyland.

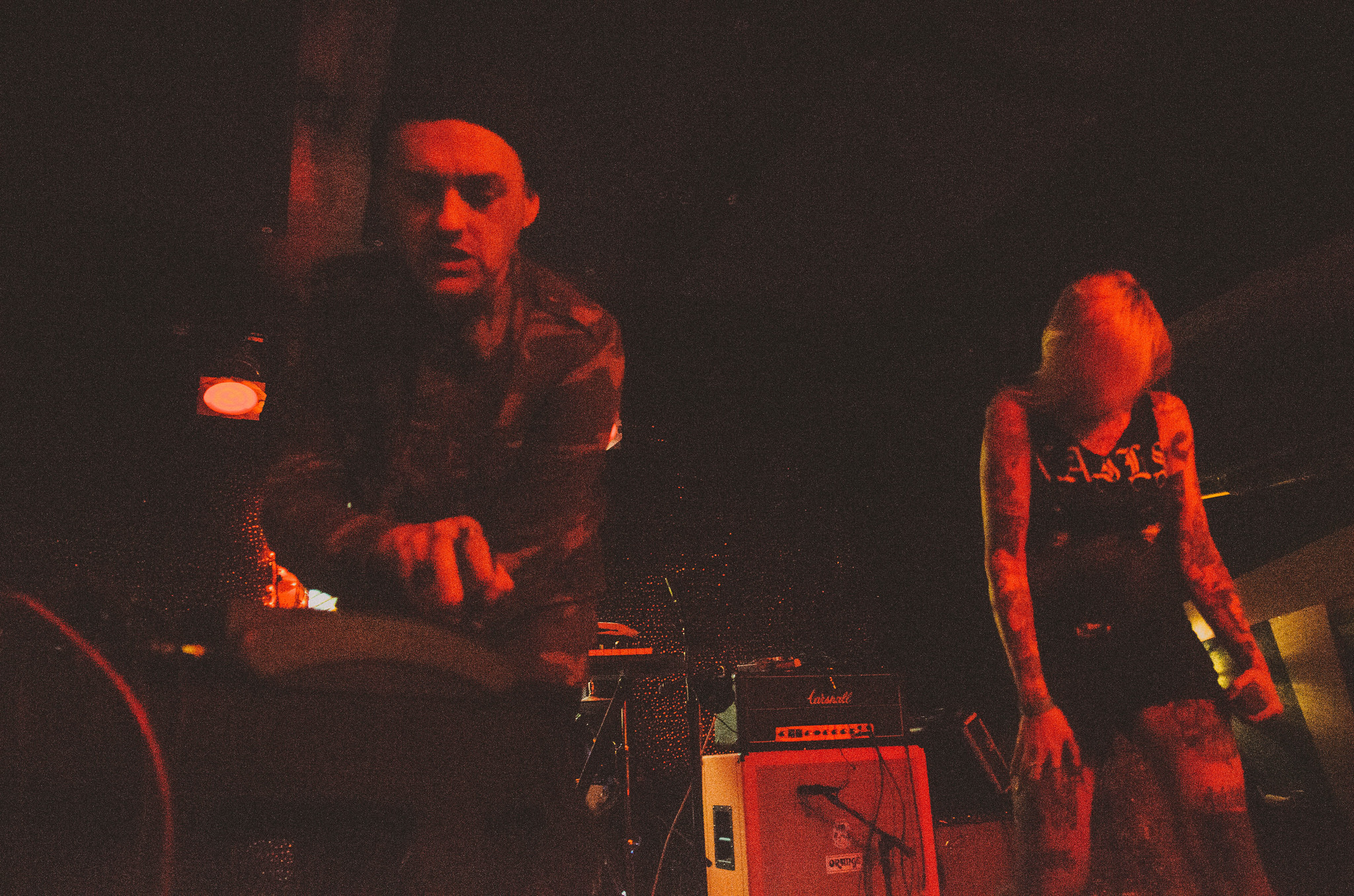
George and Taylor on stage in May 2014

Using these influences, along with a variety of synthesizers, samplers, and drum machines, Youth Code created a style that has been described as "abrasive, discordant, and violently fast." Taylor and George also draw from their past experience with the hardcore music scene. George has stated that "we listen to a lot of pretty music, punk, metal, industrial, techno stuff, and [we] kind of put everything into a blender without trying to mimic Nitzer Ebb", with Taylor responding "not that we ever tried to mimic Nitzer Ebb." Taylor has stated with regards to industrial music that "if five kids per 2500 capacity venue go home and Google what Skinny Puppy actually is, we’ve done our job for a genre we really like."

Lyrically, Youth Code explores a number of issues including racism, sexism, transphobia, and animal cruelty. Taylor, who is Youth Code's primary songwriter, has said regarding the group's lyrical content that "I guess since I’m so vocal about my belief system, people assume every song has to do with a belief system and they’re like 'fuck yeah, political stuff!'." Taylor explained further:

Writing lyrics is hard because you have to play this weird dance around with what you say... at least in my way of writing lyrics. Because if I were to just take the general approach of what I wanted to say the entire record would’ve read “fuck you for this,” ” I hate you,” and ” this is bullshit”.

While Youth Code are often seen as a reviving force in the EBM/industrial music scene, the duo have rejected this proclamation, stating that they "don’t feel any pressure to try and resurrect anything."

== Members ==
- Sara Taylor – vocals, keyboards, synthesizers, sampling (2012–present)
- Ryan George – keyboards, synthesizers, sampling, backing vocals (2012–present)

== Discography ==
=== Studio albums ===
- Youth Code (2013)
- Commitment to Complications (2016)
- A Skeleton Key in the Doors of Depression with King Yosef (2021)

=== EPs and singles ===
- Demonstrational Cassette (2012)
- Keep Falling Apart (2013)
- A Place to Stand (2014)
- Consuming Guilt (2014)
- Anagnorisis (2015)
- Innocence (2018)
- Puzzle (2020)
- No Consequence (2025)
- Yours, With Malice (2025)

=== Compilations ===
- An Overture (2014)
