= Dais Records =

American independent record label

- Founded: 2007
- Founder: Gibby Miller, Ryan Martin
- Distributor(s): Secretly Distribution
- Genre: Experimental, post-punk, ambient, alternative rock, industrial, synthpop, shoegaze, noise
- Country of origin: U.S.
- Location: Los Angeles, California, Brooklyn, New York
- Official website: www.daisrecords.com

Dais Records is an American independent record label founded in August 2007 by musicians Gibby Miller and Ryan Martin, and based in Los Angeles, California, and Brooklyn, New York.

== History ==
The label traces its origins to Ryan Martin's time as manager for industrial music pioneer Genesis P-Orridge, of Throbbing Gristle and Psychic TV renown. Martin had discovered a box of tapes that had included a recording by Early Worm, a very early project by P-Orridge, who suggested that Martin give it an official release.

== Label roster ==
=== Current artists ===
- Aaron Dilloway
- Adult.
- AURAGRAPH
- Body of Light
- Choir Boy
- CoH
- Cold Gawd
- Cold Showers
- Death Bells
- Death of Lovers
- Drab Majesty
- Drew McDowall
- Geneva Jacuzzi
- Helm
- High Vis
- Hiro Kone
- Kite
- Merzbow / Lawrence English
- Pierce with Arrow
- Private World
- Riki
- Space Afrika
- SPICE
- SRSQ
- Stephen Mallinder
- Tor Lundvall
- TR/ST
- Trauma Ray
- Vr Sex
- Xeno & Oaklander

=== Alumni ===
- American Cloud Songs
- Annabelle's Garden
- Annie Anxiety
- aTelecine
- Bestial Mouths
- Chris Brokaw
- Cold Cave
- COUM Transmissions
- Cult of Youth
- David First
- Deviation Social
- Drekka
- Frank Alpine
- Getting The Fear
- Harassor
- HIDE
- High Functioning Flesh
- Hunting Lodge
- Iceage
- Italian Horn
- JH1.FS3
- Martial Canterel
- Maurizio Bianchi
- Merzbow + Hexa
- Missing Foundation
- Nocturnal Projections
- Pink Turns Blue
- Pod Blotz
- Prurient
- Rafael Anton Irisarri
- Robert Turman
- Scout Paré-Phillips
- Seth Price
- Sightings
- Sissy Spacek
- SONOIO
- Spahn Ranch
- Tempers
- The Cakekitchen
- Thee Majesty
- Them Are Us Too
- Twin Stumps
- Wetware
- Whip & The Body
- York Factory Complaint
- YOU.
- Youth Code

== Reissues ==
- Annabelle's Garden
- Cindytalk
- Coil
- COUM Transmissions
- Genesis P-Orridge
- Getting The Fear
- Ghédalia Tazartès
- Nocturnal Projections
- Pink Turns Blue
- Psychic TV
- Ragnar Grippe
- Soisong
- Spahn Ranch
- Tony Conrad
- Tim Story
- William S. Burroughs
