= Spirit of the Age Anthology =

Compilation album by Hawkwind
- Released: 16 November 2008
- Recorded: 1976–84 and 1985–97
- Genre: Rock
- Label: Atomhenge

The Dream Goes On Anthology

Spirit of the Age and The Dream Goes On are two triple CD anthologies released in 2008 covering the periods 1976-84 and 1985-97 of the British rock group Hawkwind.

They were released on Atomhenge Records, a subsidiary of Cherry Red Records, which was dedicated to re-releasing Hawkwind's catalogue from the years 1976 to 1997. These anthologies preceded the release of the re-mastered albums which feature bonus tracks.

== Spirit of the Age (Anthology 1976-84) ==
=== Disc 1 ===
1. "Reefer Madness" [full version] (Robert Calvert, Dave Brock) – Astounding Sounds, Amazing Music – this version previously unreleased
2. "Kadu Flyer" (Nik Turner, Simon House) – Astounding Sounds, Amazing Music
3. "Steppenwolf" (Calvert, Brock) – Astounding Sounds, Amazing Music
4. "Kerb Crawler" (Calvert, Brock) – Astounding Sounds, Amazing Music
5. "Back on the Streets" (Calvert, Paul Rudolph) – single A-side
6. "The Dream of Isis" (Brock, House, Simon King) – "Back on the Streets" single B-side
7. "Quark, Strangeness and Charm" (Calvert, Brock) – Quark, Strangeness and Charm
8. "Spirit of the Age" (Calvert, Brock) – Quark, Strangeness and Charm
9. "Damnation Alley" (Calvert, Brock, House) – Quark, Strangeness and Charm
10. "Hassan i Sabbah" (Calvert, Rudolph) – Quark, Strangeness and Charm
11. "Over the Top" (Calvert, Brock) – Sonic Assassins
12. "The Golden Void" (Brock) – Sonic Assassins
13. "Psi Power" (Calvert, Brock) – 25 Years On

=== Disc 2 ===
1. "25 Years" [alternate mix] (Brock) – 25 Years On – this version previously unreleased
2. "Freefall" [non-cross-faded mix] (Calvert, Harvey Bainbridge) – 25 Years On – this version previously unreleased
3. "The Only Ones" [non-cross-faded mix] (Calvert, Brock) – 25 Years On – this version previously unreleased
4. "Uncle Sam's on Mars" (Calvert, Brock, House, King) – PXR5
5. "Jack of Shadows" (Calvert, House, Adrian Shaw) – PXR5
6. "High Rise" (Calvert, House) – PXR5
7. "Robot" (Calvert, Brock) – PXR5
8. "Shot Down in the Night" [live] [single version] (Steve Swindells) – Live Seventy Nine
9. "Brainstorm" [live] (Turner) – Live Seventy Nine
10. "Motorway City" (Brock) – Levitation
11. "Levitation" (Brock) – Levitation
12. "Space Chase" (Huw Lloyd-Langton) – Levitation
13. "Who's Gonna Win The War?" [single version] (Brock) – Levitation
14. "Nuclear Toy" (Brock, Lloyd-Langton) – "Who's Gonna Win the War?" single B-side
15. "Transdimensional Man" (Brock) – "Angels of Death" single B-side

=== Disc 3 ===
1. "Angels of Death" [alternate single version] (Brock) – Sonic Attack – this version previously unreleased
2. "Rocky Paths" (Lloyd-Langton) – Sonic Attack
3. "Virgin of the World" (Bainbridge) – Sonic Attack
4. "Nuclear Drive" (Brock) – Church of Hawkwind
5. "Some People Never Die" (Brock) – Church of Hawkwind
6. "The Psychedelic Warlords" (Brock) – "Silver Machine" single B-side
7. "Silver Machine" [single version] (Calvert, Brock) – Choose Your Masques
8. "Choose Your Masks" (Michael Moorcock, Brock) – Choose Your Masques
9. "Dream Worker" (Bainbridge) – Choose Your Masques
10. "Waiting for Tomorrow" (Lloyd-Langton) – Choose Your Masques
11. "Arrival in Utopia" (Moorcock, Brock) – Choose Your Masques
12. "Utopia `84" [live] (Brock) – Zones
13. "Social Alliance" [live] (Brock) – Zones
14. "Dragons and Fables" (Lloyd-Langton) – The Earth Ritual Preview EP
15. "Night of the Hawks" (Brock) – The Earth Ritual Preview EP
16. "Stonehenge Decoded" [live] (Brock) – This Is Hawkwind, Do Not Panic
17. "Orgone Accumulator" [live] (Calvert, Brock) – Undisclosed Files Addendum

== The Dream Goes On (Anthology 1985-97) ==
=== Disc 1 ===
1. "Song of the Swords" (Brock) – The Chronicle of the Black Sword
2. "Shade Gate" (Bainbridge) – The Chronicle of the Black Sword
3. "Needle Gun" (Brock) – The Chronicle of the Black Sword
4. "Zarozinia" (Kris Tait, Brock) – The Chronicle of the Black Sword
5. "Master of the Universe" [live] (Turner, Brock) – Live Chronicles
6. "Dreaming City" [live] (Lloyd-Langton) – Live Chronicles
7. "Moonglum" [live] (Lloyd-Langton) – Live Chronicles
8. "Elric the Enchanter" [live] (Brock, Alan Davey) – Live Chronicles
9. "Conjuration of Magnu" [live] (Brock) – Live Chronicles
10. "Magnu" [live] (Brock) – Live Chronicles
11. "Dust of Time" [live] (Brock, Bainbridge, Lloyd-Langton) – Live Chronicles
12. "Cajun Jinx" (Bainbridge, Brock, Davey, Danny Thompson) – Out and Intake
13. "The War I Survived" (Roger Neville-Neil, Brock) – The Xenon Codex
14. "Heads" (Neville-Neil, Brock) – The Xenon Codex
15. "Lost Chronicles" (Bainbridge) – The Xenon Codex
16. "Wastelands of Sleep" (Tait, Brock) – The Xenon Codex
17. "Wings" (Davey) – Space Bandits
18. "Ship of Dreams" (Brock) – Space Bandits
19. "T.V. Suicide" (Bainbridge) – Space Bandits

=== Disc 2 ===
1. "Images" (Bridget Wishart, Brock, Davey) – Space Bandits
2. "Back in the Box" (Wishart, Brock, Bainbrige, Davey, Richard Chadwick) – Palace Springs
3. "Treadmill" (Brock) – Palace Springs
4. "Assault and Battery" (listed as "Lives of Great Men") [live] (Brock) – Palace Springs
5. "The Golden Void" (listed as "Void of Golden Light") [live] (Brock) – Palace Springs
6. "Eons" (a.k.a. "Snake Dance") [live] (Brock, Bainbrige, Davey, Chadwick) – California Brainstorm
7. "Ejection" [live] (Calvert) – California Brainstorm
8. "LSD" (Davey, Chadwick) – Electric Tepee
9. "Mask of Morning" (Brock) – Electric Tepee
10. "The Secret Agent" (Brock) – Electric Tepee
11. "Letting in the Past" (a.k.a. "Looking in the Future") (Brock) – It Is the Business of the Future to Be Dangerous
12. "The Camera That Could Lie" (Brock) – It Is the Business of the Future to Be Dangerous

=== Disc 3 ===
1. "Space is Their (Palestine)" (Brock) – It Is the Business of the Future to Be Dangerous
2. "The Dream Goes On" (a.k.a. "The Iron Dream") [live] (Brock, Davey, Chadwick) – The Business Trip
3. "Right to Decide" [live] (Brock, Davey) – The Business Trip
4. "The Dream Has Ended" (a.k.a. "You Know You're Only Dreaming") [live] (Brock, Davey, Chadwick) – The Business Trip
5. "This Future" (a.k.a. "Welcome to the Future") [live] (Calvert) – The Business Trip
6. "White Zone" (Brock) – White Zone
7. "Sputnik Stan" (Davey) – Alien 4
8. "Death Trap" (Calvert, Brock) – Alien 4
9. "Alien I Am" [The Roswell Edit] (Brock) – Area S4 EP
10. "Love in Space" (Brock) – Love in Space EP
11. "Lord of Light" [live] (Brock) – Love in Space EP
12. "Distant Horizons" (Brock, Chadwick) – Distant Horizons
13. "Phetamine Street" (Ron Tree) – Distant Horizons
14. "Waimeia Canyon Drive" (Brock) – Distant Horizons
15. "Alchemy" (Jerry Richards, Chadwick) – Distant Horizons
