= Live Chronicles =

Live album by Hawkwind
- Released: 1986
- Recorded: 4 December 1985
- Venue: Hammersmith Odeon
- Genre: Space rock
- Length: 76:10
- Label: GWR
- Producer: Hawkwind

Hawkwind chronology
The Chronicle of the Black Sword (1985)	Live Chronicles (1986)	The Xenon Codex (1988)

Professional ratings
Review scores
Source	Rating
AllMusic	3/5 stars
The Encyclopedia of Popular Music	3/5 stars

Live Chronicles is a 1986 album by Hawkwind recorded of a live performance of their The Chronicle of the Black Sword concept album based on the Michael Moorcock character Elric of Melniboné. The Hammersmith Odeon dates on 3 and 4 December were professionally audio recorded and the stage show video taped.

During 1986, the group performed some festival dates, including Bristol Custom Bike Show, and headlining Reading Festival on 24 August, with a guest appearance from Lemmy and recorded by BBC Radio 1's Friday Rock Show.

The video of the Black Sword shows was released on 25 July by Jettisoundz, followed by this 2LP on 24 November. The group promoted the album's release with a 31 date UK tour in November and December, with support from The Babysitters. The Preston show was video recorded by Jettisoundz and was part released in 1996 as Chaos. The group revived the Black Sword show one last time on 28 August 1987 for the World Science Fiction Convention at Brighton Conference Centre.

Former manager Douglas Smith had set-up GWR Records for releasing albums by his roster of bands, significantly Motörhead. Although Brock had previous financial disputes with Smith, he was unhappy with the promotion and distribution his albums were receiving through Frenchy Gloder's Flicknife Records, so licensed this live recording to Smith's newly formed company. Hawkwind would remain with the label until its demise in 1991.

The cover was one of the earliest commissions for Duncan Storr, who subsequently made a career out of book and record illustrations, although this would be his only work for the group.

The original album lacked "Assault and Battery" and "Sleep of a Thousand Tears" as they had been licensed to Flicknife for single B-sides, and the Michael Moorcock spoken pieces due to Moorcock being in dispute with GWR owner Smith. They would be restored to subsequent re-issues on the Griffin and Atomhenge labels. "Assault and Battery" and "Sleep of a Thousand Tears" are in mono on those releases. The two tracks appear in stereo on the Flicknife CD "The Chronicle Of The Black Sword".

== Track listing ==
=== Original version ===
1. "Song of the Swords" (Dave Brock) – 3:13
2. "Dragons and Fables" (Huw Lloyd-Langton) – 3:11
3. "Narration" (Harvey Bainbridge) – 0:47
4. "The Sea King" (H. Lloyd-Langton) – 3:47
5. "Angels of Death" (Brock) – 4:43
6. "Shade Gate" (Bainbridge) – 3:54
7. "Rocky Paths" (H. Lloyd-Langton, Marion Lloyd-Langton) – 2:51
8. "Narration - Elric The Enchanter (Part 1)" (Brock) –0:37
9. "The Pulsing Cavern" (Bainbridge, Alan Davey) – 2:32
10. "Master of the Universe" (Brock, Nik Turner) – 3:57
11. "Dreaming City" (H. Lloyd-Langton, M. Lloyd-Langton ) – 4:18
12. "Choose Your Masques" (Brock, Michael Moorcock) – 4:55
13. "Fight Sequence" (Bainbridge, Brock) – 3:21
14. "Needle Gun" (Brock) – 4:10
15. "Zarozinia" (Brock, Kris Tait) – 4:15
16. "Lords of Chaos" (Bainbridge, Brock) – 1:00
17. "The Dark Lords" (Bainbridge, Brock) – 1:36
18. "Wizards of Pan Tang" (Bainbridge, Brock, Davey, Lloyd-Langton, Danny Thompson) – 1:46
19. "Moonglum" (H. Lloyd-Langton) – 4:44
20. "Elric the Enchanter (Part 2)" (Davey) – 2:33
21. "Conjuration of Magnu" (Brock) – 1:48
22. "Magnu" (Brock) – 3:16
23. "Dust of Time" (Bainbridge, Brock, H. Lloyd-Langton) – 2:29
24. "Horn of Fate" (Brock) – 6:27

=== Castle CD bonus tracks ===
1. "Magnu" (Brock) – 3:10 - from Hawkwind Anthology
2. "Quark, Strangeness and Charm" (Robert Calvert, Brock) – 2:35 - from Hawkwind Anthology
3. "Spirit of the Age" (Calvert, Brock) – 7:45 - from Live Seventy Nine
4. "Who's Gonna Win the War" (Brock) – 4:47 - from Levitation
5. "Ghost Dance" (Bainbridge, Turner) – 5:34 - from Hawkwind Anthology
6. "Master of the Universe" (Brock, Turner) – 3:54 - from Live Chronicles
7. "Choose Your Masques" (Brock, Moorcock) – 4:52 - from Live Chronicles
8. "Lost Chronicles" (Bainbridge) / "Neon Skyline" (Davey) – 5:21 - from The Xenon Codex
9. "Tides" (H. Lloyd-Langton) – 2:53 - from The Xenon Codex
10. "Wings" (Davey) – 5:22 - from Space Bandits
11. "Lives of Great Men" [a.k.a. "Assault And Battery"] (Brock) – 3:26 - from Palace Springs
12. "Void of Golden Light" [a.k.a. "Golden Void"] (Brock) – 6:48 - from Palace Springs
13. "Techno Tropic Zone Exists" (Brock) – 4:31 - from It is the Business of the Future to be Dangerous
14. "Gimme Shelter" (Mick Jagger, Keith Richards) – 5:38 - from It is the Business of the Future to be Dangerous

=== Griffin and Atomhenge versions ===
CD1

1. "The Chronicle of the Black Sword" (Michael Moorcock) - 1.52
2. "Song of the Swords" (Brock) - 3:09
3. "Dragons and Fables" (H. Lloyd-Langton) - 3:09
4. "Narration" (Bainbridge) – 0:45
5. "The Sea King" (H. Lloyd-Langton) – 3:07
6. "Dead God's Homecoming" (Moorcock) - 1:31
7. "Angels of Death" (Brock) – 4:42
8. "The Shade Gate" (Bainbridge) – 3:49
9. "Rocky Paths" (H. Lloyd-Langton, Marion Lloyd-Langton) – 2:52
10. "Narration - Elric The Enchanter (Part 1)" (Brock) –0:55
11. "The Pulsing Cavern" (Bainbridge, Davey) – 2:14
12. "Master of the Universe" (Brock, Turner) – 4:00
13. "Dragon Song" (Moorcock) - 1:32
14. "Dreaming City" (H. Lloyd-Langton, M. Lloyd-Langton) – 4:29
15. "Choose Your Masques" (Brock, Moorcock) – 4:51
16. "Fight Sequence" (Bainbridge, Brock) – 3:25

CD2

1. "Assault and Battery" (Brock) - 3:40
2. "Sleep of a Thousand Tears" (Brock, Moorcock) - 4:37
3. "Zarozinia" (Brock, Tait) – 4:16
4. "Lords of Chaos" (Bainbridge, Brock) – 1:00
5. "The Dark Lords" (Bainbridge, Brock) – 1:37
6. "Wizards of Pan Tang" (Bainbridge, Brock, Davey, H. Lloyd-Langton, Thompson) - 1:41
7. "Moonglum" (H. Lloyd-Langton, M. Lloyd-Langton) – 4:40
8. "Elric the Enchanter (Part 2)" (Davey) – 2:26
9. "Needle Gun" (Brock) – 4:07
10. "Conjuration of Magnu" (Brock) – 1:52
11. "Magnu" (Brock) – 3:16
12. "Dust of Time" (Bainbridge, Brock, H. Lloyd-Langton) – 2:30
13. "The Final Fight" (Moorcock) - 1:27
14. "Horn of Fate (Destiny)" (Brock) – 6:39

== Personnel ==
Hawkwind

- Dave Brock – electric guitar, keyboards, vocals
- Huw Lloyd-Langton – electric guitar, vocals
- Harvey Bainbridge – keyboards, vocals
- Alan Davey – bass guitar, vocals
- Danny Thompson Jr – drums

with

- Michael Moorcock – vocals
- Tony Crerar – mime & dance
- Kris Tait – mime & dance, vocals
- Tim Pollard – mime

== Release history ==
- Nov 1986: GWR, GWSP1, UK vinyl
- Feb 1994: Griffin Music, GCDHA0136-2, USA 2CD includes reprint of Michael Moorcocks Elric novel "The Dreaming City".
- Aug 1998: Castle Communications, CCSCD829, UK 2CD with bonus tracks
- January 2009: Atomhenge (Cherry Red) Records, ATOMCD2007, UK CD
