= Electric Tepee =

Studio album by Hawkwind
- Released: 11 May 1992
- Recorded: 1992
- Studio: Earth Studios, Devon
- Genre: Space rock
- Length: 74:27
- Label: Essential Records, Griffin Music
- Producer: Paul Cobbold, Hawkwind

Hawkwind chronology
Palace Springs (1991)	Electric Tepee (1992)	It Is the Business of the Future to Be Dangerous (1993)

Professional ratings
Review scores
Source	Rating
AllMusic	3/5 stars
The Encyclopedia of Popular Music	3/5 stars

Electric Tepee is the seventeenth studio album by the English space rock group Hawkwind, released in 1992. It spent one week on the UK albums chart at #53.

After a European tour in March and April 1991, long-standing bass guitarist and keyboardist Harvey Bainbridge chose to leave the group. Vocalist Bridget Wishart would also end her association with the group in September. The group would go on to operate as a three piece of guitarist Dave Brock, bassist Alan Davey and drummer Richard Chadwick, making heavy use of sequencers, synthesisers and computers, both in the studio and live. The style of Electric Tepee is predominantly space rock, with elements of trance, ambient and techno.

The album was recorded in 1992 at Brock's own Earth Studios, produced with Paul Cobbold. "Mask of the Morning" re-uses the lyrics from "Mirror of Illusion" from the 1970 debut album Hawkwind. "Death of War" uses lyrics written by Mark Rowntree, credited as "Rown Tree", a convicted killer who has been held in a secure hospital since 1976. "Rites of Netherworld" is a brief keyboard piece based on Igor Stravinsky's The Rite of Spring. The instrumental track "Don't Understand" includes samples of dialogue from Star Trek the Motion Picture and Star Trek the Next Generation (specifically the episode The Offspring).

The cover is the first by Alan Arthurs, who was part of the band's crew and also worked on Brock's Devon farm. The album came in a gatefold sleeve with a painting of Castlerigg stone circle in the fold-out. It was the group's first of two for Essential Records, a subsidiary of Castle Communications.

The group undertook a 23 date UK tour in April and May to promote the album, appearing behind a curtain on which the lightshow was projected. An all-nighter at the Brixton Academy on 15 August, when they were joined on-stage by Salt Tank, was released as Brixton Academy 15.8.92, using an amateur video shoot of the event.

== Track listing ==
No.	Title	Writer(s)	Length
1.	"L.S.D."	Richard Chadwick, Alan Davey	8:17
2.	"Blue Shift"	Davey	4:17
3.	"Death of War"	Rowntree, Dave Brock	4:47
4.	"The Secret Agent"	Brock	8:11
5.	"Garden Pests"	Brock, Davey	2:09
6.	"Space Dust"	Davey	5:18
7.	"Snake Dance"	Harvey Bainbridge, Brock, Chadwick, Davey	3:54
8.	"Mask of Morning"	Brock	8:49
9.	"Rites of Netherworld"	Brock	0:36
10.	"Don't Understand"	Brock, Chadwick, Davey	7:04
11.	"Sadness Runs Deep"	Brock	5:58
12.	"Right to Decide"	Brock, Davey	4:25
13.	"Going to Hawaii"	Brock, Chadwick, Davey	7:35
14.	"Electric Tepee"	Brock	3:07

== Personnel ==
Hawkwind

- Dave Brock – electric guitar, keyboards, vocals
- Alan Davey – bass guitar, vocals, keyboards
- Richard Chadwick – drums

== Charts ==
Chart (1992)	Peak position
UK Albums (Official Charts)	53

== Release history ==
- May 1992: Essential Records, ESDLP181, UK Double LP (Limited edition of 5000)
- May 1992: Essential Records, ESSCD181, UK CD
- May 1992: Essential Records, ESSMC181, UK Cassette
- July 1995: Griffin Music, GN0931-2, USA
- January 2009: Atomhenge (Cherry Red) Records, ATOMCD1008, UK CD
