= This Is Hawkwind, Do Not Panic =

Live album by Hawkwind
- Released: November 1984
- Recorded: Lewisham Odeon, 18 December 1980 and Stonehenge Free Festival, June 1984
- Genre: Space rock
- Length: 51:38
- Label: Flicknife Records

Hawkwind chronology
Zones (1983)	This Is Hawkwind, Do Not Panic (1984)	The Chronicle of the Black Sword (1985)

Professional ratings
Review scores
Source	Rating
The Encyclopedia of Popular Music	2/5 stars

This is Hawkwind, Do Not Panic is a 1984 live album by the English space rock group Hawkwind. The album consisted of two discs: an LP which was recorded during the group's 1980 Levitation tour; and a 12-inch EP recorded at their June 1984 appearance at the Stonehenge Free Festival.

The group's line-up had changed by their June 1984 appearance at the Stonehenge Free Festival, with guitarists Dave Brock, Huw Lloyd-Langton and saxophonist Nik Turner remaining, Harvey Bainbridge switching from bass to keyboards. They were joined by bassist Alan Davey and drummer Clive Deamer, although Danny Thompson Jr deputised for Deamer on the Stonehenge recording.

The group undertook a 13 date UK tour in November 1984 to promote this album, with support from Wildfire. The Sheffield University show on 27 November was recorded, and part released on Undisclosed Files Addendum (1995).

The tracks from disc 1 have been re-issued on the 2009 3CD re-issue of Levitation.

== Track listing ==
=== Side 1 (33 RPM) ===
1. "Psi Power" [listed as "Psy Power"] (Robert Calvert, Dave Brock) – 5:07
2. "Levitation" (Brock) – 7:15
3. "Psychosis" [unlisted] (Harvey Bainbridge) – 1:27
  "The Fifth Second of Forever" [listed as "Circles"] (Brock, Huw Lloyd-Langton) – 4:14
4. "Space Chase" (Lloyd-Langton) – 3:19

=== Side 2 (33 RPM) ===
5. "Death Trap" (Calvert, Brock) – 4:42
6. "Angels of Death" (Brock) – 6:27
7. "Shot Down in the Night" (Steve Swindells) – 7:07

=== Side 3 (45 RPM) ===
8. "Stonehenge Decoded" (Brock, Bainbridge) – 8:20

=== Side 4 (45 RPM) ===
9. "Watching the Grass Grow" (Nik Turner, Trev Thoms) – 3:40

== Personnel ==
Hawkwind

- Dave Brock – electric guitar, keyboards, vocals
- Huw Lloyd Langton – guitar, vocals
- Harvey Bainbridge – bass guitar, keyboards, vocals
- Keith Hale – keyboards (sides 1 & 2)
- Ginger Baker – drums (sides 1 & 2)
- Nik Turner – saxophone, flute, vocals (sides 3 & 4)
- Alan Davey – bass guitar, vocals (sides 3 & 4)
- Danny Thompson Jr – drums (sides 3 & 4)

== Notes ==
- Side 1&2: Lewisham Odeon, 18 December 1980
- Side 3&4: Stonehenge Free Festival, June 1984

== Release history ==
- Nov-1984: Flicknife Records, SHARP022, 12"33RPM & 12"45RPM, first 10000 copies came in gatefold cover, the next 5000 copies in single cover with poster, thereafter simply single cover.
- Nov-1988: Flicknife Records, SHARP1422CD, UK CD with Zones
- May-1992: Anagram Records, CDMGRAM 54, CD UK
- Jul-1994: Griffin Music, GCDHA163-2, CD USA
- Jul-2000: Cleopatra Records, CLE08502, USA 2CD with Zones
- Jul-2002: Anagram Records, CDMGRAM160, UK 2CD with Zones
