= The Xenon Codex =

1988 studio album by Hawkwind

Studio album by Hawkwind
- Released: 25 April 1988
- Recorded: February and March 1988
- Studio: Loco Studios, Caerleon; Rockfield Studios, Monmouth
- Genre: Space rock
- Length: 43:54
- Label: GWR
- Producer: Hawkwind, Guy Bidmead

Hawkwind chronology
Live Chronicles (1986)	The Xenon Codex (1988)	Space Bandits (1990)

The Xenon Codex is the fifteenth studio album by the English space rock group Hawkwind, released in 1988. It spent two weeks on the UK albums chart peaking at #79.

The group's line-up remained unchanged for three years. The album was recorded at Loco Studios, Caerleon and Rockfield Studios, Monmouth in February and March 1988. It was produced with Guy Bidmead, who had previously been Vic Maile's assistant.

The lyrics to "The War I Survived" and "Heads" were written by Roger Neville-Neil, who was a Hawkwind fan. "Lost Chronicles" is banded as separate track, but it forms the instrumental middle section of "Neon Skyline".

The cover is by Bob Walker, who had also illustrated the inner sleeve for The Chronicle of the Black Sword and adapted Michael Butterworth's Ledge of Darkness in graphic novel form. It is an Art Deco design derived from the hawk by Barney Bubbles on the rear cover of Astounding Sounds, Amazing Music. Initial copies came in a fold-out sleeve with a die-cut front.

The group undertook a 25 date UK tour in April to promote the album. The Hammersmith Odeon show on 21 April was recorded by BBC Radio 1 for broadcast as a 60-minute in-concert programme.

After the tour, drummer Thompson left the group. He was replaced by former Dumpy's Rusty Nuts drummer Mick Kirton for some September dates, but the group felt he was unsuitable. Richard Chadwick, a veteran drummer of groups involved with the English free-festival scene, then joined for an 18 date UK tour in November and December. The Nottingham Rock City show on 7 December was recorded, and part released on Undisclosed Files Addendum (1995), with these tracks being included as bonus tracks on the 2010 re-issue.

== Track listing ==
Side One
No.	Title	Writer(s)	Length
1.	"The War I Survived"	Dave Brock, Alan Davey, Roger Neville-Neil	5:23
2.	"Wastelands of Sleep"	Kris Tait, Brock	4:14
3.	"Neon Skyline"	Davey	2:19
4.	"Lost Chronicles"	Harvey Bainbridge	5:20
5.	"Tides"	Huw Lloyd-Langton	2:54

Side Two
No.	Title	Writer(s)	Length
6.	"Heads"	Brock, Neville-Neil	4:55
7.	"Mutation Zone"	Bainbridge, Brock	3:57
8.	"E.M.C."	Bainbridge	4:53
9.	"Sword of the East"	Davey	5:24
10.	"Good Evening"	Hawkwind	4:35

Atomhenge CD bonus tracks
No.	Title	Writer(s)	Length
11.	"Ejection"	Calvert	4:29
12.	"Motorway City"	Brock	6:47
13.	"Dragons and Fables"	Lloyd-Langton	3:19
14.	"Heads"	Neville-Neil, Brock	3:52
15.	"Angels of Death"	Brock	5:36

== Personnel ==
Hawkwind

- Dave Brock – electric guitar, keyboards, vocals
- Harvey Bainbridge – keyboards, vocals
- Huw Lloyd-Langton – electric guitar
- Alan Davey – bass guitar, electric guitar, vocals
- Danny Thompson Jr – drums

== Credits ==
- Recorded at Loco Studios, Caerleon and Rockfield Studios, Monmouth, February and March 1988.
- Produced with Guy Bidmead.
- Cover by Bob Walker.

== Charts ==
Chart (1988)	Peak position
UK Albums (OCC)	79

== Release history ==
- April 1988: Great Western Records, GWLP 26, vinyl and CD - initial vinyl copies came in a fold out cover.
- 1989: Enigma/GWR, 7 75407–1, USA CD and vinyl
- February 1992: Castle Communications, CLACD 281, UK CD
- July 1999: Essential Records, ESMCD 737, UK CD digipak
- May 2010: Atomhenge (Cherry Red) Records, ATOMCD1022, UK CD

== Reception ==
Professional ratings
Review scores
Source	Rating
Allmusic	3/5 stars
The Encyclopedia of Popular Music	3/5 stars
