= Space Bandits =

Studio album by Hawkwind
- Released: 24 September 1990
- Recorded: April–June 1990
- Studio: Rockfield Studios
- Genre: Space rock
- Length: 39:07
- Label: GWR
- Producer: Hawkwind, Paul Cobbold

Hawkwind chronology
The Xenon Codex (1988)	Space Bandits (1990)	Palace Springs (1991)

Professional ratings
Review scores
Source	Rating
AllMusic	2.5/5 stars
Classic Rock	5/10 stars
The Encyclopedia of Popular Music	3/5 stars

Space Bandits is the sixteenth studio album by the English space rock group Hawkwind, released in 1990. It spent one week on the UK albums chart at #70.

By mid-1989, the group's line-up had changed once again. Guitarist Dave Brock, keyboardist Harvey Bainbridge, and bassist Alan Davey remained. Drummer Richard Chadwick had just established himself, while lead guitarist Huw Lloyd-Langton had left, his position occasionally being filled by former keyboardist Simon House providing lead lines on violin. In addition, singer Bridget Wishart had started to perform with the group. This new line-up recorded a 60-minute live performance at Lenton Lane television studios, Nottingham on 25 January 1990 for broadcast on the ITV late-night series Bedrock, later released as the video Live Legends.

The group entered Rockfield Studios in April through to June to record this album, produced with Paul Cobbold. "Black Elk Speaks" features a sample of John Neihardt reading from his book Black Elk Speaks, the testimony of Black Elk as given to Neihardt. The cover is by Joe Petagno, who had done some publicity artwork for Hawkwind's Warrior on the Edge of Time album, from which he had befriended the then group's bassist Lemmy, and gone on to do most of Motörhead's cover work. The album was released on Motörhead manager Douglas Smith's GWR label.

The group undertook a 25 date UK tour in October and November to promote the album, although House had left the group by then. This was followed by 18 North America dates in December, the Oakland Omni Theatre show on 16 December being recorded and released as California Brainstorm.

Still supporting Space Bandits, 1991 commenced with perhaps the most surprising Hawkwind tour in the band's history, without Dave Brock. Brock's temporary replacement was former Smart Pils guitarist Steve Bemand (who had played with Chadwick and Wishart in the Demented Stoats). The tour began in Amsterdam on 12 March and took in Germany, Greece, Italy and France before wrapping up in Belgium on 10 April after 24 dates.

== Track listing ==
Side one
No.	Title	Writer(s)	Length
1.	"Images"	Bridget Wishart, Dave Brock, Alan Davey	9:34
2.	"Black Elk Speaks"	Black Elk, Brock	5:15
3.	"Wings"	Davey	5:22

Side two
No.	Title	Writer(s)	Length
4.	"Out of the Shadows"	Doug Buckley, Brock, Davey	4:57
5.	"Realms"	Davey	3:26
6.	"Ship of Dreams"	Brock	5:13
7.	"T.V. Suicide"	Harvey Bainbridge	5:20

Atomhenge CD bonus tracks
No.	Title	Writer(s)	Length
8.	"Out of the Shadows" (Live)	Davey, Brock, Buckley	7:55
9.	"Snake Dance" (Live (Previously unreleased))	Davey, Brock, Bainbridge, Simon House	4:26
10.	"Images" (Single version)	Wishart, Brock, Davey	6:04

== Personnel ==
Hawkwind

- Bridget Wishart – vocals
- Dave Brock – electric guitar, keyboards, vocals (track 4,6)
- Alan Davey – bass guitar, vocals (track 3)
- Simon House – violin
- Harvey Bainbridge – keyboards, vocals (track 7)
- Richard Chadwick – drums

== Credits ==
- Recorded at Rockfield Studios, April to June 1990.
- Produced with Paul Cobbold.
- Sleeve by Joe Petagno.

== Charts ==
Chart (1990)	Peak position
UK Albums (OCC)	70

== Release history ==
- September 1990: GWR, GWLP103, UK
- February 1992: Castle Communications, CLACD282, UK
- July 1999: Castle Communications, ESMCD738, UK CD digipak
- September 2010: Atomhenge (Cherry Red) Records, ATOMCD1025, UK CD
