= Out & Intake =

Compilation album by Hawkwind
- Released: April 1987
- Recorded: Rockfield Studios, 1982 and 1986, live 1982
- Genre: Space rock
- Label: Flicknife Records
- Producer: Hawkwind

Hawkwind chronology
Hawkwind Anthology (1985)	Out & Intake (1987)	BBC Radio 1 Live in Concert (1991)

Professional ratings
Review scores
Source	Rating
Allmusic	2.5/5 stars
The Encyclopedia of Popular Music	2/5 stars
Kerrang!	2/5 stars

Out and Intake is a 1987 (see 1987 in music) live/studio album by the English space rock group Hawkwind.

The album is compiled from various sources: studio out-takes from 1982; live recordings from 1982's Choose Your Masques tour; studio out-takes from 1987. Dave Brock stated of the release that "it was bits and pieces we had hanging around, weird things like "Turner Point". Harvey had "Cajun Jinx". It was really just to finance us all and keep the whole thing going".

Of the 1987 studio out-takes, there were re-recordings of old tracks: "Ejection" from Robert Calvert's 1974 album Captain Lockheed and the Starfighters, and "Assassins of Allah" (also known as "Hassan-i-Sabbah") from the 1977 album Quark, Strangeness and Charm.

== Track listing ==
=== Side 1 ===
1. "Turner Point" (Dave Brock, Martin Griffin, Nik Turner) – 2:19 (A)
2. "Waiting for Tomorrow" (Huw Lloyd-Langton, Marion Lloyd-Langton) – 4:45 (B)
3. "Cajun Jinx" (Brock, Harvey Bainbridge, Alan Davey, Danny Thompson) – 5:02 (C)
4. "Solitary Mind Games" (Lloyd-Langton, Lloyd-Langton) – 5:09 (B)
5. "Starflight" (Robert Calvert, Bainbridge, Brock) – 1:48 (C)
6. "Ejection" (Calvert) – 2:14 (C)

=== Side 2 ===
7. "Assassins of Allah" [aka "Hassan-i-Sabah"] (Calvert, Paul Rudolph) – 3:53 (C)
8. "Flight to Maputo" (Brock, Bainbridge, Davey, Thompson) – 5:23 (C)
9. "Confrontation" (Brock, Bainbridge, Davey, Thompson) – 3:02 (C)
10. "Five to Four" (Lloyd-Langton) – 2:18 (A)
11. "Ghost Dance" (Turner, Bainbridge) – 3:47 (B)

=== CD bonus tracks ===
12. "Coded Languages" (Michael Moorcock, Bainbridge) – 4:20 (B)
13. "Warrior on the Edge of Time" (Moorcock) – 3:33 (B)

== Personnel ==
- Dave Brock – electric guitar, keyboards, vocals
- Huw Lloyd-Langton – electric guitar, vocals
- Harvey Bainbridge – bass guitar, keyboards, vocals
- Martin Griffin – drums (tracks (A) and (B))
- Nik Turner – saxophone, flute, vocals (tracks (A) and (B))
- Alan Davey – bass guitar, vocals (tracks (C))
- Danny Thompson Jr – drums (tracks (C))

with

- Michael Moorcock – vocals (bonus tracks only)
- Paul Cobbold – organ ("Cajun Jinx" and "Flight To Maputo")

== Recording ==
- (A) Recorded at Rockfield Studios, 1982
- (B) Recorded live, November 1982
- (C) Recorded at Rockfield Studios, 1986

== Release history ==
- April 1987: Flicknife Records, UK vinyl, SHARP040; UK CD, SHARP040CD
- May 1992: Griffin Music, GN03922-2, USA CD
- November 1994: Hawkdiscs/Dojo Records, DOJOCD153, UK CD
