= The Chronicle of the Black Sword =

Studio album by Hawkwind
- Released: 11 November 1985
- Recorded: August–September 1985
- Studio: Rockfield Studios
- Genre: Space rock
- Length: 37:12
- Label: Flicknife Records, Griffin Music
- Producer: Hawkwind

Hawkwind chronology
This Is Hawkwind, Do Not Panic (1984)	The Chronicle of the Black Sword (1985)	Live Chronicles (1986)

Alternative cover
- Griffin release, North America 1994

Professional ratings
Review scores
Source	Rating
AllMusic	3/5 stars
The Encyclopedia of Popular Music	3/5 stars

The Chronicle of the Black Sword is the fourteenth studio album by the English space rock group Hawkwind, released in 1985. It spent two weeks on the UK Albums Chart peaking at #65. The album is based upon the adventures of Elric of Melniboné, a recurring character in the novels of science fiction author Michael Moorcock, a long-standing associate of the group, who contributes lyrics to one track on the album.

== Background ==
After two years of constant line-up changes, guitarist Dave Brock (the only member who has remained since the band's formation) settled on a line-up of himself, guitarist Huw Lloyd-Langton, keyboardist Harvey Bainbridge, bassist Alan Davey, and drummer Danny Thompson (son of Pentangle's bassist Danny Thompson).

Though the album is largely inspired by Elric, "Needle Gun" is a reference to Jerry Cornelius, another of Moorcock's fictional characters. In keeping with the album's title, the track's inclusion refers to the wider Multiverse created by Moorcock, in which the characters Elric of Melniboné and Jerry Cornelius are both incarnations of The Eternal Champion, and the Needle Gun is the form in which the Black Sword manifests itself to Cornelius. The lyrics for "Needle Gun" were ghostwritten by Roger Neville-Neil.

The outer cover was designed by John Coulthart, the last work he would do for the group, and the inner by Bob Walker. The album was originally intended to be titled after the name of the sword Stormbringer, but was changed due to it having been used by both Deep Purple as well as John and Beverley Martyn.

Prior to the recording of the album, the group appeared on Channel 4's ECT on 26 April and recorded a session for BBC Radio 1 on 19 July. They headlined an anti-heroin festival at Crystal Palace on 24 August, with a guest appearance from Lemmy and a final sing-song of "We'll Meet Again" led by Vera Lynn.

The group undertook a 29 date UK tour in November and December to promote the album, with support from Dumpy's Rusty Nuts. The Hammersmith Odeon shows on 3 and 4 December were filmed and recorded, released as the video The Chronicle of the Black Sword and album Live Chronicles, and featured a guest appearance from Moorcock.

It has been issued on CD multiple times, each with differing bonus tracks. The latest issue in 2009 includes 1984's The Earth Ritual Preview EP.

== Track listing ==
Side 1
No.	Title	Writer(s)	Length
1.	"Song of the Swords"	Dave Brock	3:25
2.	"Shade Gate"	Harvey Bainbridge	3:01
3.	"The Sea King"	Huw Lloyd-Langton	3:23
4.	"The Pulsing Cavern"	Bainbridge, Alan Davey	2:33
5.	"Elric the Enchanter"	Davey	4:51

Side 2
No.	Title	Writer(s)	Length
6.	"Needle Gun"	Brock	4:13
7.	"Zarozinia"	Brock, Kris Tait	3:21
8.	"The Demise"	Bainbridge, Brock	1:02
9.	"Sleep of a Thousand Tears"	Brock, Michael Moorcock	4:09
10.	"Chaos Army"	Bainbridge, Brock	0:53
11.	"Horn of Destiny"	Brock	6:21

Flicknife CD bonus tracks
No.	Title	Writer(s)	Length
12.	"Arioch"	Davey	3:26
13.	"Assault and Battery" (Live)	Brock	3:39
14.	"Sleep of a Thousand Tears" (Live)	Moorcock, Brock	4:41

Dojo and Griffin CD bonus tracks
No.	Title	Writer(s)	Length
12.	"The War I Survived" (Live)	Brock, Davey, Neville-Neil	4:00
13.	"Voice Inside Your Head" (Live)	Bainbridge, Brock	4:57

Atomhenge CD bonus tracks
No.	Title	Writer(s)	Length
12.	"Arioch"	Davey	3:24
13.	"Night of the Hawks"	Julian Bishop	5:06
14.	"Green Finned Demon"	Calvert, Brock	6:05
15.	"Dream Dancers"	Brock, Bainbridge	1:28
16.	"Dragons & Fables"	Lloyd, Langton	3:21

== Personnel ==
Hawkwind

- Dave Brock – guitar, keyboards, vocals
- Huw Lloyd-Langton – guitar, vocals
- Harvey Bainbridge – keyboards, vocals
- Alan Davey – bass guitar, vocals
- Danny Thompson Jr. – drums
- Dave Charles – percussion

== Credits ==
- Recorded at Rockfield Studios, August/September 1985. Produced with Dave Charles.
- "The War I Survived" and "Voice Inside Your Head" recorded at Hammersmith Odeon, 22 April 1988.
- Outer sleeve by John Coulthart, inner sleeve by Bob Walker.

== Charts ==
Chart (1985)	Peak position
UK Albums (OCC)	65

== Release history ==
- November 1985: Flicknife Records, SHARP033, UK vinyl, first 10000 with inner sleeve including typed lyrics
- 1986: Flicknife Records, SHARP033D, UK CD
- August 1992: Dojo, DOJOCD72, UK CD
- May 1994: Griffin Music, GCDHA 0142-2, USA CD
- 29 June 2009: Atomhenge (Cherry Red) Records, ATOMCD1012, UK CD
