= Bridget Wishart =

- Also known as: Bridgett Wishart
- Born: 25 February 1962 (age 64); Plymouth, Devon, England
- Genres: Rock; space rock; psychedelic rock; proto-punk
- Occupations: Singer; musician; performance artist
- Instruments: Vocals; EWI; clarinet
- Labels: GWR; Gonzo Multimedia; Voiceprint; Black Widow; Musea; Noh Poetry; Submarine Broadcasting Company
- Member of: Chumley Warner Brothers; Spirits Burning
- Formerly of: Hawkwind

Bridget Wishart (born 25 February 1962) is an English singer and performance artist, best known for being the lead vocalist of English rock band Hawkwind from 1989 to 1991. She is currently a member of Spirits Burning and the Chumley Warner Brothers.

== Early years ==
Most of the bands that Wishart played with prior to Hawkwind were located around Bath. Her first band was The Demented Stoats in 1979 with future Hawkwind drummer Richard Chadwick and guitarist Steve Bemand, followed by Next Years Big Thing, and then the Hippy Slags. Wishart was later in two other bands with Chadwick and Bemand: Pilwind, and Star Nation.

== Career ==
=== With Hawkwind ===
In 1989, Wishart started to perform with Hawkwind, alongside Dave Brock, keyboardist Harvey Bainbridge, bassist Alan Davey, drummer Richard Chadwick, and Simon House on violin. Wishart's role included singing vocals for studio and live songs, and donning costumes and doing mime to enhance songs in the live setting.

This line-up of Hawkwind produced two albums, 1990's Space Bandits and 1991's Palace Springs. Space Bandits spent one week on the UK albums chart at #70. Wishart shared writing credits with Brock and Davey on Space Bandits' opening song, titled "Images." Wishart also shared writing credits with Bainbridge, Brock, and Davey on Palace Springs' Back In The Box.

This line-up also filmed a 1-hour appearance for the Bedrock TV series, later released as the video Nottingham 1990.

1990 saw Hawkwind with Wishart tour the US, the second installment in a series of American visits made at around this time in an effort to re-establish the Hawkwind brand in America. After a European tour in March and April 1991 (with Steve Bemand filling in for Dave Brock), Wishart ended her association with the group.

=== With Spirits Burning ===
Wishart returned to music in 2007, accepting an invite from Don Falcone of Spirits Burning. Since 2007, Wishart and Don Falcone have collaborated in Spirits Burning (including CDs released under the name Spirits Burning & Bridget Wishart). Wishart and Falcone also have an instrumental project called Astralfish. In 2017, Wishart performed live with Spirits Burning, alongside Steve Bemand, Richard Chadwick, Kev Ellis, Don Falcone, Colin Kafka, and Martin Plumley. Wishart sang and played EWI (Electronic Wind Instrument).

=== With other bands ===
Wishart has contributed vocals and EWI (Electronic Wind Instrument) to albums by other bands in the space rock, new music, and experimental community, including: Djinn and Hawkestrel (both with former Hawkwind bass player Alan Davey), Astralfish, Bridget Wishart & The Band of Doctors, Hola One with Bridget Wishart, Karda Estra, Mooch, Omenopus, Osiris the Rebirth, and Spaceseed.

Wishart still performs live, as a member of the Chumley Warner Brothers live duo (with partner Martin Plumley).

== Discography ==
=== With Hawkwind ===
- 1990: Space Bandits
- 1991: Palace Springs
- 1992: California Brainstorm
- 1994: Live Legends
- 1994: 25 Years On
- 2002: Live in Nottingham 1990
- 2005: Glastonbury 90
- 2008: The Dream Goes On: From the Black Sword to Distant Horizons
- 2009: Treworgey Tree Festival 1989
- 2009: USA Tour 1989-1990

=== With Spirits Burning ===
- 2008: Alien Injection
- 2008: Earth Born (by Spirits Burning & Bridget Wishart)
- 2009: Our Best Trips: 1998 to 2008
- 2009: Bloodlines (by Spirits Burning & Bridget Wishart)
- 2010: Crazy Fluid
- 2011: Behold The Action Man
- 2013: Healthy Music In Large Doses (by Spirits Burning & Clearlight)
- 2014: Make Believe It Real (by Spirits Burning & Bridget Wishart)
- 2015: Starhawk
- 2016: The Roadmap In Your Head (by Spirits Burning & Clearlight)
- 2017: "The Roadmap In Your Heart" b/w "Another Roadmap In Your Head" and "An Ambient Heat" (by Spirits Burning & Daevid Allen)
- 2018: An Alien Heat (by Spirits Burning & Michael Moorcock)
- 2020: The Hollow Lands (by Spirits Burning & Michael Moorcock)
- 2021: Evolution Ritual
- 2022: Recollections Of Instrumentals
- 2023: The End Of All Songs - Part 1 (by Spirits Burning & Michael Moorcock)
- 2024: Live At Kozfest
- 2025: The End Of All Songs - Part 2 (by Spirits Burning & Michael Moorcock)
- 2026: Fragments (by Spirits Burning & Bridget Wishart)

=== With other bands and projects ===
Astralfish

- 2012: Far Corners

Bridget Wishart & The Band of Doctors

- 2020: Ghost

Hawkestrel

- 2019: The Future Is Us

Omenopus

  - 2010: Portents (Sampler)
  - 2010: Time Flies
  - 2011: Allies & Clansmen (Multi-artist compilation featuring Omenopus song "Call Your Name")
  - 2012: The Plague / Scars
  - 2012: Allies & Clansmen: The Next Descendant (Multi-artist compilation featuring Omenopus song "Brick by Stone")
  - 2014: The Archives
  - 2014: The Omenopus Compendium Of Souvenirs (Sampler)

== Personal life ==
Prior to recording music professionally, Wishart obtained a BA in Fine Art from Newport Art School and an MFA from Reading University. She became a fellow of Gloucestershire College of Arts and Technology, and taught ceramic sculpture at Prior Park College, Bath.

In the 1990s, she was an artist designer and painter for Temple Decor, a UV design company used by WOMAD.
