= Zones (album) =

Compilation album by Hawkwind
- Released: 28 October 1983
- Recorded: 1980–1982
- Genre: Space rock
- Length: 46:52
- Label: Flicknife Records

Hawkwind chronology
The Text of Festival (1983)	Zones (1983)	This Is Hawkwind, Do Not Panic (1984)

Professional ratings
Review scores
Source	Rating
The Encyclopedia of Popular Music	3/5 stars

Zones is an album by Hawkwind released in 1983 consisting of studio demos from 1981 and live performances between 1980 and 1982.

The tracks on side 1 have been included on the 2009 3CD re-issue of Levitation in expanded form.

== Track listing ==
=== Side 1 ===
1. "Zones" (Dave Brock) – 0:46
2. "Dangerous Vision" (Keith Hale) – 5:05
3. "Running Through the Back Brain" (Michael Moorcock, Brock, Harvey Bainbridge, Huw Lloyd-Langton, Hale, Ginger Baker) – 6:17
4. "The Island" [aka "Dust of Time"] (Lloyd-Langton, Brock) – 3:17
5. "Motorway City" (Brock) – 4:57

=== Side 2 ===
6. "Utopia 84" (Brock) – 2:06
7. "Social Alliance" (Brock) – 4:39
8. "Sonic Attack" (Moorcock, Hawkwind) – 5:47
9. "Dream Worker" (Bainbridge) – 5:28
10. "Brainstorm" (Nik Turner) – 8:30

== Personnel ==
Hawkwind

- Michael Moorcock – vocals (side 1, track 3)
- Dave Brock – electric guitar, keyboards, vocals
- Huw Lloyd-Langton – electric guitar, vocals
- Harvey Bainbridge – bass guitar, keyboards, vocals
- Keith Hale – keyboards, vocals (side 1)
- Ginger Baker – drums (side 1)
- Martin Griffin – drums (side 2)
- Nik Turner – saxophone, flute, vocals (side 2)

== Notes ==
- Side 1, tracks 2,3: Battle Studio, 1981
- Side 1, tracks 4,5: Lewisham Odeon, 18 December 1980
- Side 2: recorded live on the "Choose Your Masques Tour", 1982

== Charts ==
Chart (1983)	Peak position
UK Albums (OCC)	57

== Release history ==
- Oct-1983: Flicknife Records, SHARP014, vinyl
- Mar-1984: Flicknife Records, PSHARP014, picture disc (2000 copies)
- Nov-1988: Flicknife Records, SHARP1422CD, UK CD with first disc from This Is Hawkwind, Do Not Panic
- Nov-1992: Anagram Records, CDMGRAM57, UK CD
- Jul-1994: Griffin Music, GCDHA164-2, USA CD
- Jul-2000: Cleopatra Records, CLE08502, USA 2CD with This Is Hawkwind, Do Not Panic
- Jul-2002: Anagram Records, CDMGRAM160, UK 2CD with This Is Hawkwind, Do Not Panic
