= Undisclosed Files Addendum =

Live album by Hawkwind
- Released: 27 February 1995
- Recorded: Tracks 1–6: Sheffield University, 27 November 1984; tracks 7–11: Nottingham Rock City, 7 December 1988
- Genre: Space rock
- Label: EBS – EBSCD114

Hawkwind chronology
California Brainstorm (1992)	Undisclosed Files Addendum (1995)	The 1999 Party (1997)

Alternative cover

Professional ratings
Review scores
Source	Rating
Allmusic	3/5 stars

Undisclosed Files (LP version) was released by Hawkwind to promote their new (at the time) label, The Emergency Broadcast System in 1993, catalogue number "HAWKWIND·1".

Undisclosed Files Addendum is the 1995 CD release with slightly modified tracks.

Both are live album releases by Hawkwind, composed of highlights from two concerts in 1984 and 1988.

Tracks 7–11 were re-released in May 2010 as bonus tracks on The Xenon Codex.

The 1984 tracks were recorded live, at Sheffield University 27 November 1984. The 1988 tracks were recorded at Hammersmith Odeon, December 1988. The 1988 tour was Richard Chadwick's first Hawkwind tour.

== Track listing - (Original vinyl release) - "Undisclosed Files" ==
1. "Orgone Accumulator" (Calvert/BrocK) – 5:22 (1984)
2. "Sonic Attack" (Moorcock/Hawkwind) – 7:00 (1984)
3. "Watching the Grass Grow" (Turner/Thoms) – 5:10 (1984)
4. "Damned By the Curse Of Man" (Moorcock/Hawkwind) – 4:24 (1984)
5. "Master of the Universe" (Turner/Brock) (1988)
6. "Coded Languages" (Moorcock Bainbridge) (1988)
7. "Ejection" (Calvert) – 4:29 (1988)
8. "Motorway City" (BrocK) – 6:47 (1988)
9. "Dragons and Fables" (Lloyd-Langton) – 3:19 (1988)
10. "Heads" (Neville-Neil/BrocK) – 3:52 (1988)
11. "Angels of Death" (BrocK) – 5:36 (1988)

== Track listing - (CD release) - "Undisclosed Files Addendum" ==
1. "Orgone Accumulator" (Calvert/BrocK) – 5:22 (1984)
2. "Ghost Dance" (Turner/Bainbridge) – 7:11 (1984)
3. "Sonic Attack" (Moorcock/Hawkwind) – 7:00 (1984)
4. "Watching the Grass Grow" (Turner/Thoms) – 5:10 (1984)
5. "Coded Languages" (Moorcock/Bainbridge) – 5:10 (1984)
6. "Damned By the Curse Of Man" (Moorcock/Hawkwind) – 4:24 (1984)
7. "Ejection" (Calvert) – 4:29 (1988)
8. "Motorway City" (BrocK) – 6:47 (1988)
9. "Dragons and Fables" (Lloyd-Langton) – 3:19 (1988)
10. "Heads" (Neville-Neil/BrocK) – 3:52 (1988)
11. "Angels of Death" (BrocK) – 5:36 (1988)

== Personnel ==
- Dave Brock – guitar, keyboards, vocals
- Huw Lloyd-Langton – guitar, vocals
- Nik Turner – saxophone, flute, vocals (1984 tracks only)
- Alan Davey – bass guitar, vocals
- Harvey Bainbridge – keyboards, vocals
- Clive Deamer – drums (1984 tracks only)
- Richard Chadwick – drums (1988 only)
