= California Brainstorm =

Live album by Hawkwind
- Released: July 1992
- Recorded: 16 December 1990
- Venue: Oakland Omni Theatre
- Genre: Space rock
- Length: Original: 68:11; Re-issue: 74:37
- Labels: USA: Iloki – ILCD1014; UK: Cyclops – CYCL-015
- Producer: Hawkwind

Hawkwind chronology
Hawklords Live (1992)	California Brainstorm (1992)	Undisclosed Files Addendum (1995)

Professional ratings
Review scores
Source	Rating
Allmusic	2.5/5 stars
The Encyclopedia of Popular Music	3/5 stars

California Brainstorm is a live album by the British space rock group Hawkwind, recorded during their North America tour in 1990, and released in 1992 in the USA on the Iloki label.

In 1994 it received a UK release by Cyclops, which included the extra track "Images" and was also available in limited boxset containing Robert Godwin's book A Collector's Guide to Hawkwind.

The full track listing is now also available as an extra CD on a re-release of Palace Springs which was recorded on the previous year's North American tour.

== Background ==
Despite relative success in North America in the early 1970s, Hawkwind's pull there had waned by the time of their 1978 tour, with no record contract and playing to audiences of around 500–600. Nevertheless, they retained a small cult following throughout the 1980s despite no tours and most albums being available only on import.

In September and October 1989 they ventured back for a 13 date low-key tour, part of which was released on the Palace Springs album. They followed this up with an 18 date tour in December 1990, relying upon dedicated fans to help with sound and lighting gear. One of these fans, Brad Knox, supervised the video recording of some shows, and in 1992 received permission from Brock to release a CD of an edited soundtrack from 16 December 1990 Oakland Omni Theatre show.

=== Set list ===
This CD starts part way through the show, "Void's End" being the end of "The Golden Void". Prior to that, the band opened the set list with either "Angels of Death" or "Needle Gun". "Wings" was also performed, but omitted from the CD.

=== Tour dates ===
- 28 November: Boston, Channel Club
- 30 November: Philadelphia, Ambler
- 1 December: New York, Wetlands
- 2 December: Washington, 9:30 Club
- 4 December: Toronto, Diamond
- 5 December: Cleveland, Empire
- 6 December: Cleveland, Empire
- 7 December: Chicago, Cubby Bear
- 8 December: River Grove, Thirsty Whale
- 9 December: Milwaukee, Shank Hall
- 11 December: Minneapolis, Glam Slam
- 13 December: Denver, Mercury Club
- 15 December: Los Angeles, Lingerie
- 16 December: Oakland, Omni
- 17 December: San Francisco, I – Beam
- 19 December: Portland, Day For Night
- 20 December: Vancouver, Town Pump
- 22 December: Long Beach, Bogarts

== Track listing ==
1. "Void's End" (Dave Brock) – 5:27
2. "Ejection" (Robert Calvert) – 5:58
3. "Brainstorm" (Nik Turner) – 8:51
4. "Out of the Shadows" (Doug Buckley, Brock, Alan Davey)
  "Eons" [aka "Snake Dance"] (Hawkwind)
  "Night of the Hawks" (Brock) – 18:08
5. "TV Suicide" (Harvey Bainbridge)
  "Back in the Box" (Hawkwind)
  "Assassins of Allah" [aka "Hassan-i-Sabah"] (Calvert, Paul Rudolph) – 20:14
6. "Propaganda" (Hawkwind) – 1:08
7. "Reefer Madness" (Calvert, Brock) – 8:25

Cyclops release only:

8. "Images" (Bridget Wishart, Brock, Davey) – 6:15

== Personnel ==
- Bridget Wishart – vocals
- Dave Brock – electric guitar, keyboards, vocals
- Alan Davey – bass guitar, vocals
- Harvey Bainbridge – keyboards, vocals
- Richard Chadwick – drums, vocals
