= It Is the Business of the Future to Be Dangerous =

Studio album by Hawkwind
- Released: 25 October 1993
- Recorded: 1993
- Studios: Barking Dog Studios, Devon
- Genres: Space rock; trance; ambient; techno
- Length: 63:17
- Label: Essential Records
- Producer: Hawkwind

Hawkwind chronology
Electric Tepee (1992)	It Is the Business of the Future to Be Dangerous (1993)	The Business Trip (1994)

Professional ratings
Review scores
Source	Rating
Allmusic	3/5 stars
The Encyclopedia of Popular Music	3/5 stars
Kerrang!	3/5 stars

It Is the Business of the Future to Be Dangerous is the eighteenth studio album by the English space rock group Hawkwind, released in 1993. It spent one week on the UK albums chart at #75.

As with the previous album, Electric Tepee, the group remained a three-piece of guitarist Dave Brock, bassist Alan Davey and drummer Richard Chadwick. The album was recorded in 1993 at Brock's own Barking Dog Studios, produced with Paul Cobbold.

The title track "It Is the Business of the Future to Be Dangerous" is a quote from the mathematician/philosopher Alfred Whitehead's Science and the Modern World, which had originally been used on the sleeve notes to the Space Ritual album ("It is the business of the future to be dangerous; and it is among the merits of science that it equips the future for its duties"). The Arabic-influenced "Space Is Their (Palestine)" would be worked into the middle section of the live version of "Hassan I Sabbah", retitled "Assassins of Allah". "Letting in the Past" is a re-recording of "Looking in the Future" from the 1982 album Church of Hawkwind. "The Camera That Could Lie" is a reggae-influenced piece that fused music which had previously been used in the middle section of the live version of "Damnation Alley" on the 1992 album Palace Springs with lyrics from the song "Living on a Knife Edge" from the 1981 album Sonic Attack. "Gimme Shelter" is a cover version of the Rolling Stones song that the group had recorded with Samantha Fox for the Shelter benefit single "Putting Our House in Order", although this album version removes Fox's vocal. Drummer Richard Chadwick performs vocals instead.

The cover is by Alan Arthurs (credited as Alan The Ghost) who was part of the band's crew and also worked on Brock's Devon farm, and was responsible for covers from Electric Tepee to Love in Space. On-stage photographs were by John Chase. It was the group's second of two for Essential Records, a subsidiary of Castle Communications.

The group undertook a 21-date UK tour in November to promote the album. This was followed by a 12 date Germany/Netherlands tour in December. Some shows were recorded and were released as The Business Trip and the mistitled Treworgey 1989 CD.

== Track listing ==
No.	Title	Writer(s)	Length
1.	"It Is the Business of the Future to Be Dangerous"	Dave Brock, Richard Chadwick, Alan Davey	6:23
2.	"Space Is Their (Palestine)"	Brock	11:46
3.	"Tibet Is Not China (Part 1)"	Davey	3:39
4.	"Tibet Is Not China (Part 2)"	Brock, Chadwick, Davey	3:20
5.	"Let Barking Dogs Lie"	Brock, Chadwick, Davey	9:01
6.	"Wave Upon Wave"	Davey	3:13
7.	"Letting in the Past" (aka "Looking in the Future")	Brock	2:53
8.	"The Camera That Could Lie"	Brock	4:56
9.	"3 or 4 Erections in the Course of a Night"	Brock, Davey	2:02
10.	"Techno Tropic Zone Exists"	Brock	4:30
11.	"Gimme Shelter" (Rolling Stones cover)	Mick Jagger, Keith Richards	5:34
12.	"Avante"	Brock, Chadwick, Davey	6:00

Atomhenge CD bonus track
No.	Title	Writer(s)	Length
13.	"Gimme Shelter" (Single version with Samantha Fox)	Jagger, Richards	5:56

Atomhenge bonus CD
No.	Title	Writer(s)	Length
1.	"Spirit of the Age" (Radio Edit)	Dave Brock, Robert Calvert	4:08
2.	"Spirit of the Age" (Full Vocal Mix)	Brock, Calvert	9:52
3.	"Spirit of the Age" (Cyber Trance Mix)	Brock, Calvert	9:53
4.	"Spirit of the Age" (Flesh to Phantasy Ambient Mix)	Brock, Calvert	12:08
5.	"Right to Decide" (Original Mix)	Dave Brock, Alan Davey	4:24
6.	"The Camera That Would Not Lie" (Original Mix)	Brock	5:17
7.	"Right to Decide" (Alien Prophets Radio Edit Mix)	Brock, Davey	4:09
8.	"Assassin" (Magick Carpet Mix by Swordfish / Astralasia)	Calvert	10:21

== Notes ==
- "The Solstice Remixes" EP: tracks 1–4
- The "Right to Decide" EP: tracks 5–8

== Personnel ==
Hawkwind

- Dave Brock – guitars, keyboards, programming, sequencing, sampling, vocals
- Alan Davey – bass guitar, vocals, keyboards, programming, sequencing, sampling
- Richard Chadwick – drums, vocals

== Credits ==
- Recorded at Barking Dog Studios, Devon
- Engineered by Paul Cobbold
- Produced by Hawkwind
- Artwork by Alan The Ghost

"The Solstice Remixes" EP

- Remixes by Astralasia
- Produced by Salt Tank

The "Decide Your Future" EP

- Compiled and Arranged by Salt Tank

== Charts ==
Chart (1993)	Peak position
UK Albums (Official Charts)	75

== Release history ==
- October 1993: Essential Records, ESDLP196, UK Double LP
- October 1993: Essential Records, ESSCD196, UK CD
- October 1993: Essential Records, ESSMC196, UK Cassette
- June 1994: Griffin Music, GCDHA 161-1, USA
- July 1999: Essential Records, ESMCD 740, UK CD digipak
- January 2012: Atomhenge (Cherry Red) Records, ATOMCD21032, UK CD
