= Zarozinia =

Zarozinia can mean:

- A character in the Michael Moorcock's Elric series of stories: see Elric of Melniboné#Characters in the Elric series
- A Hawkwind song first released on their The Chronicle of the Black Sword album, named for the character in the Elric stories
