= Church of Hawkwind =

Studio album by Hawkwind
- Released: 14 May 1982
- Recorded: 1981–1982
- Genre: Synth-rock
- Length: 35:29
- Label: Active
- Producer: Dr Technical

Hawkwind chronology
Sonic Attack (1981)	Church of Hawkwind (1982)	Choose Your Masques (1982)

Professional ratings
Review scores
Source	Rating
AllMusic	2/5 stars
The Encyclopedia of Popular Music	2/5 stars

Church of Hawkwind is the twelfth studio album by Hawkwind, released under the band name Church of Hawkwind in 1982. The name change reflects the fact that this was a musical departure for the band, being a more experimental electronic offering rather than the usual heavy rock that the band were known for at the time.

Dave Brock resurrects the "Dr Technical" alias which he had previously used for production of the band's 1972 hit single "Silver Machine". This is almost a Dave Brock solo album considering the heavy bias towards his work, and none of these tracks were performed live by the band, save "Looking in the Future" which was re-recorded as "Letting in the Past" on It is the Business of the Future to be Dangerous.

"The Phenomenon of Luminosity" features a sample of John Glenn on the Friendship Seven spacecraft during the Mercury-Atlas 6 mission on 20 February 1962. An alternative version of "Experiment With Destiny" had appeared on the preceding year's Sonic Attack album as "Virgin of the World".

Although credited to Dave Brock, the track "Some People Never Die" borrows much of its material from the track "They Call Me Gun" on an obscure LP by "On The Seventh Day" (US Mercury Records 61248, 1970), right down to the Robert F. Kennedy and Lee Harvey Oswald shooting commentaries. Alternative versions of "Some People Never Die" appear on Spacebrock and the Dave Brock solo album Earthed to the Ground (as "Assassination").

The CD bonus tracks on the 1994 Griffin release were recorded in the 1990s and seem at odds with the overall feel of the album, and they were placed in the middle of a resequenced side 2 by Dave Brock, disrupting the flow of the album, for example the rowing that linked "Some People Never Die" with "Light Specific Data" now has 5 tracks in between. The 2010 Atomhenge CD restores the original running order and provides a different set of bonus material.

== Track listing ==
=== Side 1: Space ===
1. "Angel Voices" (Dave Brock, Harvey Bainbridge) – 1:21 – Brock; Bainbridge
2. "Nuclear Drive" (Brock) – 3:39 – Brock; Lloyd-Langton; Griffin
3. "Star Cannibal" (Brock) – 5:31 – Brock; Lloyd-Langton; Griffin
4. "The Phenomenon of Luminosity" (Brock) – 2:40 – Brock
5. "Fall of Earth City" (Brock, Bainbridge, Huw Lloyd-Langton) – 3:24 – Brock; Bainbridge; Lloyd-Langton; Griffin
6. "The Church" (Brock, Lloyd-Langton) – 1:32 – Brock; Lloyd-Langton

=== Side 2: Fate ===
7. "Joker at the Gate" (Brock, Bainbridge) – 1:51 – Brock; Bainbridge; Griffin
8. "Some People Never Die" (Brock) – 3:52 – Brock; Sperhawk; Bodi
9. "Light Specific Data" (Brock) – 3:48 – Brock; Bainbridge; Griffin
10. "Experiment with Destiny" (Brock, Bainbridge) – 2:31 – Brock; Bainbridge; Griffin
11. "The Last Messiah" (Brock, Bainbridge) – 1:27 – Brock; Bainbridge; Madam X
12. "Looking in the Future" (Brock) – 4:03 – Brock; Bainbridge; Lloyd-Langton; Griffin

=== Atomhenge CD bonus tracks ===
13. Angel Voices" [Extended Version] (Brock, Bainbridge) – 2:21
14. "Harvey's Sequence" (Bainbridge) – 3:01
15. "Fall of Earth City" [Alternate Version] (Brock, Bainbridge, Lloyd-Langton) – 4:50
16. "Water Music (Light Specific Data)" (Brock) – 4:42
17. "Looking in the Future" / "Virgin of the World" (Brock) – 10:23

=== Griffin CD ===
1. "Angel Voices" (Brock, Bainbridge) – 1:21
2. "Nuclear Drive" (Brock) – 3:39
3. "Star Cannibal" (Brock) – 5:31
4. "The Phenomenon of Luminosity" (Brock) – 2:40
5. "Fall of Earth City" (Brock, Bainbridge, Lloyd-Langton) – 3:24
6. "The Church" (Brock, Lloyd-Langton) – 1:32
7. "Identimate" (Brock) – 3:45 – bonus track – Brock; Davey; Chadwick
8. "Some People Never Die" (Brock) – 3:52
9. "Damage of Life" (Brock) – 5:50 – bonus track – Brock; Davey; Chadwick
10. "Experiment with Destiny" (Brock, Bainbridge) – 2:31
11. "Mists of Meridin" (Brock, Alan Davey) – 5:13 – bonus track – Brock; Davey; Chadwick
12. "Looking in the Future" (Brock) – 4:03
13. "Joker at the Gate" (Brock, Bainbridge) – 1:51
14. "Light Specific Data" (Brock) – 3:48
15. "The Last Messiah" (Brock, Bainbridge) – 1:27

== Personnel ==
Hawkwind

- Dave Brock – electric guitar, bass guitar, keyboards, vocals
- Huw Lloyd-Langton – electric guitar, vocals
- Harvey Bainbridge – bass guitar, keyboards, vocals
- Martin Griffin– drums

with

- Marc Sperhawk – bass guitar
- Capt Al Bodi – drums
- Alan Davey – bass guitar (bonus tracks on 1994 rerelease)
- Richard Chadwick – drums (bonus tracks on 1994 rerelease)
- Kris Tait (Madam X) – crying

== Credits ==
- Recorded at Rockfield Studios December 1981 to February 1982.
- Produced by Dr Technical, engineered by Pat Moran and Ashley Howe.
- Cover by Andrew Christian and Partridge/Rushton. Booklet illustrations by John Coulthart and Tim.

== Equipment listed ==
- Korg 700 Keyboard
- Korg Analogue Seq
- Korg MS-20
- Korg Polyphonic
- Roland Jupiter 4
- Roland Sho9
- EMS Synthi
- 2 Roland 201 Space Echoes
- Koorlander Time Module
- Koorlander Multichorus Delay Module
- Pubison
- Westone Thunder HI Guitar
- Westone Paduak Guitar (stated as "Westone Padewak Guitar" on the original LP sleeve.)
- Westone Thunder 1Bass

== Charts ==
Chart (1982)	Peak position
UK Albums (Official Charts)	26

== Release history ==
- May 1982: RCA Active, RCALP9004 – initial copies came with a 12-page lyric book
- June 1994: Dojo, DOJOCD86, UK CD
- March 1994: Griffin Music, GN0932-2, USA CD
- April 2010: Atomhenge (Cherry Red) Records, ATOMCD1021, UK CD
