= Sonic Attack =

Studio album by Hawkwind
- Released: 2 October 1981
- Recorded: June–August 1981
- Studios: Rockfield Studios, Wales
- Genres: Heavy metal; hard rock
- Length: 42:09
- Label: RCA/Active
- Producers: Hawkwind and Ashley Howe

Hawkwind chronology
| Levitation (1980) | Sonic Attack (1981) | Church of Hawkwind (1982) |

Professional ratings
Review scores
| Source | Rating |
|---|---|
| AllMusic | 2/5 stars |
| The Encyclopedia of Popular Music | 3/5 stars |

Sonic Attack is the eleventh studio album by the English space rock group Hawkwind, released on 2 October 1981. It spent five weeks on the UK Albums Chart peaking at #19.

After the departure of drummer Ginger Baker and keyboardist Keith Hale following the previous album Levitation, former Hawklords drummer Martin Griffin accepted the opportunity to re-join the group, while guitarist Dave Brock and bassist Harvey Bainbridge decided to forgo a dedicated keyboardist and to handle synthesisers and sequencers themselves.

The album was recorded June through August 1981 at Rockfield Studios, but during recording drummer Griffin contracted German measles, curtailing his contributions and resulting in him having to overdub some of his drum parts. Of Brock's tracks, Bainbridge explained the recording process as "Dave turned up with his eight track, dumped what he had onto the multi-track and the rest of us somehow had to play around what he'd done". Science fiction author Michael Moorcock, a long-standing associate of the group, contributes lyrics and vocals to the album, his theme being social control through the use of language.

Musically, it is one of the group's most heavy metal-influenced albums. The title track, "Sonic Attack", is a re-recording of the Space Ritual spoken piece with a new electronic backing. "Virgin of the World" is credited as being from Church of Hawkwind, and it appeared on that album in a different form as "Experiment with Destiny". "Angels of Death" was released as a single backed by the non-album "Transdimensional Man".

The group undertook a 28 date UK tour in September and October to promote the album, with support from Mama's Boys. An additional seven date Christmas followed, which saw former members Robert Calvert, Nik Turner and Moorcock guest on the London Rainbow date. A 13 date European tour in March 1982 followed, supporting Krokus.

== Track listing ==
=== Side 1 ===
1. "Sonic Attack" (Michael Moorcock, Hawkwind) – 4:47
2. "Rocky Paths" (Huw Lloyd-Langton) – 4:00
3. "Psychosonia" (Moorcock, Hawkwind) – 2:32
4. "Virgin of the World" (Harvey Bainbridge) – 4:32
5. "Angels of Death" (Dave Brock) – 5:42

=== Side 2 ===
6. "Living on a Knife Edge" (Brock) – 4:48
7. "Coded Languages" (Moorcock, Bainbridge) – 4:50
8. "Disintegration" (Brock) – 1:05
9. "Streets of Fear" (Brock) – 4:09
10. "Lost Chances" (Moorcock, Brock) – 5:44

=== 1996 CD bonus track ===
11. "Transdimensional Man" (Brock) – 5:05 (last 60 seconds is filled by silence)

=== Atomhenge bonus CD ===
1. "Angels of Death" [single version] – 3:40
2. "Transdimensional Man" [single B-side] – 4:00
3. "Sonic Attack" [first version] – 3:30
4. "Out of the Void" [demo of "Joker at the Gate" from Church of Hawkwind] – 2:07
5. "Lost Chances" [extended alternate version] – 7:08
6. "Streets of Fear" [alternate version] – 5:49
7. "Devilish Dirge" [demo of "The Church" from Church of Hawkwind] – 3:52
8. "The End of Earth City" [demo of "The Fall of Earth City" from Church of Hawkwind] – 6:29
9. "Living on a Knife Edge" [extended version] – 6:45
10. "The Speed of Light" [demo of "Transdimensional Man"] – 7:57

== Personnel ==
Hawkwind

- Dave Brock – electric guitar, keyboards, vocals
- Huw Lloyd-Langton – electric guitar, vocals
- Harvey Bainbridge – bass guitar, keyboards, vocals
- Martin Griffin – drums
- Michael Moorcock – vocals (on "Coded Languages")

== Credits ==
- Recorded at Rockfield Studios, Wales, June to August.
- Engineers – Ashley Howe, Pat Moran, Paul Cobbold.
- Sleeve designed by Jim Mountjoy and Andrew Christian.

== Charts ==
| Chart (1981) | Peak position |
|---|---|
| UK Albums (Official Charts) | 19 |

| Chart (2022) | Peak position |
|---|---|
| UK Independent Albums (Official Charts) | 36 |

== Release history ==
- October 1981: RCA/Active, RCALP 6004, UK vinyl – initial copies came with a lyric sheet insert.
- October 1996: Emergency Broadcast System Records, EBSCD123, UK CD
- October 1996: Griffin Music, GCD612-2, USA CD
- February 2010: Atomhenge (Cherry Red) Records, ATOMCD2019, UK 2CD
