= Spirit of the Age =

Spirit of the Age may refer to:

- Spirit of the age, an English translation of the German phrase zeitgeist
- "Spirit of the Age" (song), a 1977 song by Hawkwind
- Spirit of the Age (album), a 1988 album by Hawkwind
- Spirit of the Age Anthology, a 2008 album by Hawkwind
- Spirit of the Age (TV series), a 1975 British television series
- The Spirit of the Age, an 1825 book by William Hazlitt

== See also ==
- Zeitgeist (disambiguation)
