= Earthed to the Ground =

Studio album by Dave Brock
- Released: May 1984
- Recorded: 1980–1984
- Genre: Space rock
- Label: Flicknife Records
- Producer: Dave Brock

Dave Brock chronology
Earthed to the Ground (1984)	Dave Brock and the Agents of Chaos (1988)

Earthed to the Ground is a 1984 (see 1984 in music) debut solo studio album by the English space rock musician Dave Brock.

It is essentially a collection of home demos Brock made for work with his group Hawkwind. "Assassination" had previously been released by the band as "Some People Never Die" on the Church of Hawkwind album, and "Green Finned Demon" would be released with additional contributions from other band members on the EP The Earth Ritual Preview.

== Track listing ==
=== Side 1 ===
1. "Earthed to the Ground" (Brock)
2. "Assassination" (Brock)
3. "Green Finned Demon" (Robert Calvert, Brock)
4. "Spirits" (Brock)

=== Side 2 ===
5. "Sweet Obsession" (Brock)
6. "Oscillations" (Brock)
7. "Machine Dreams" (Brock)
8. "Now Is the Winter of Our Discontent" (William Shakespeare, Brock)
9. "On the Case" (Calvert, Brock)

=== Bonus tracks (Flicknife CD) ===
All tracks taken from Dave Brock and the Agents of Chaos, but omits "Into the Realms" and "Mountain in the Sky"

10. "Hi Tech Cities" (Brock)
11. "A Day" (Brock)
12. "In the Office" (Brock)
13. "Hades Deep" (Brock)
14. "Words of a Song" (Brock)
15. "Heads" (Roger Neville-Neil, Brock)
16. "Nocturne" (Brock)
17. "Wastelands of Sleep" (Kris Tait, Brock)
18. "Empty Dreams" (Brock)

=== Bonus tracks (Voiceprint CD) ===
10. "Raping Robots" (Brock)
11. "Wired Up For Sound" (Brock)
12. "Riding The Range" (Brock)
13. "Sleep Of 1000 Tears" (Michael Moorcock, Brock)
14. "Social Alliance" (Brock)

=== Bonus tracks (Atomhenge CD) ===
Tracks 10–11 from Hawkfan single; Tracks 12–13 from Flicknife single; Track 14 from Hawkwind, Friends And Relations Volume 3

10. "Zones" (Brock)
11. "Processed" (Brock)
12. "Social Alliance" (Brock)
13. "Raping Robots In The Street" (Brock)
14. "Wired Up For Sound" [alternate version of "Earthed to the Ground"] (Brock)

== Personnel ==
- Dave Brock – All instruments and vocals

== Release history ==
- May 1984: Flicknife Records, UK, 12" vinyl (SHARP018)
- May 1989: Flicknife Records, UK, CD (SHARP1842)
- July 2003: Voiceprint Records, UK, 2CD (HAWKVP23CD) with Dave Brock and the Agents of Chaos
- 25 April 2011: Atomhenge (Cherry Red) Records, ATOMCD1027, UK CD
