= Nuclear Drive =

Nuclear Drive may refer to:

- A song from the album Church of Hawkwind by Hawkwind
- Nuclear propulsion
