= Hawklords (2000s band) =

British space rock band

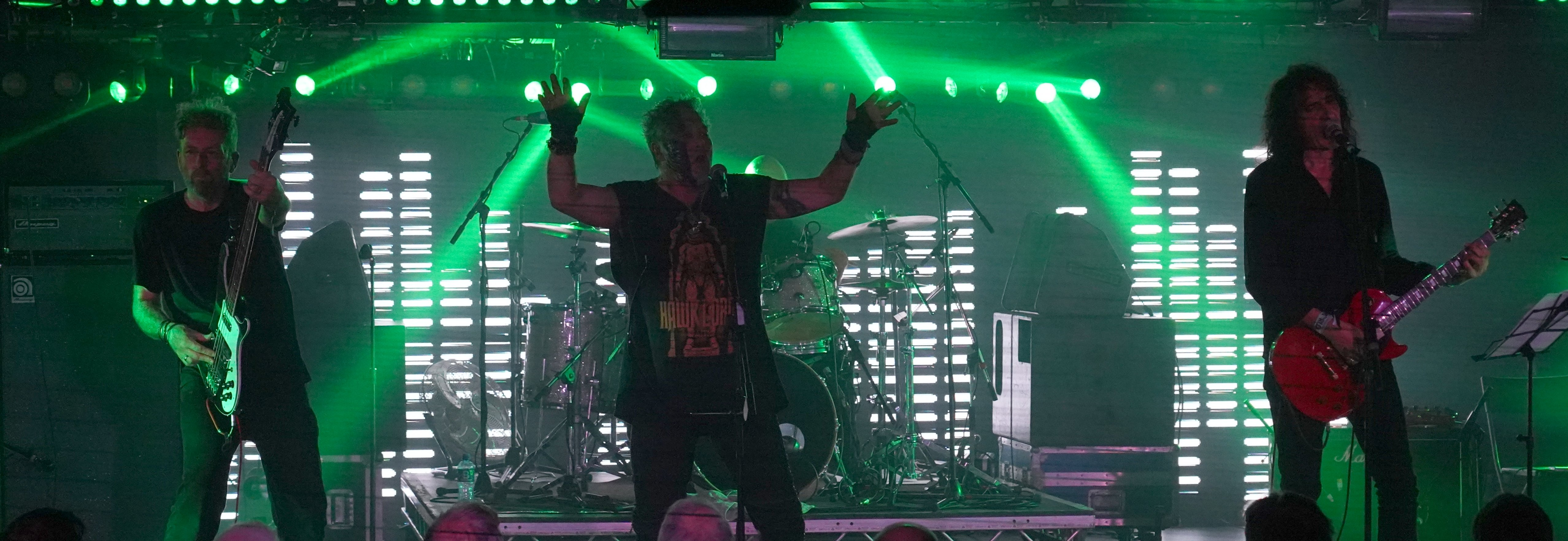
- Hawklords in 2025

Background information
- Genre: Space rock
- Years active: 2008–present
- Members: Jerry Richards; Dave Pearce; Kriss Gordelier; Graham Manson
- Past members: Ron Tree; Adrian Shaw; *Steve Swindells; *Meurig Griffiths; Alan Davey; Harvey Bainbridge; Martin Griffin; Tom Ashurst; Mr Dibs; Phillip Reeves; Chris Purdon

Hawklords is a British space rock band formed in 2008. The band started as a one-off ensemble of musicians formerly associated with Hawkwind, first playing Hawkwind covers and then recording original albums. Although the band uses the same name as the short-lived 1978 incarnation of Hawkwind, it is not a reunion or tribute. Three musicians (Harvey Bainbridge, Martin Griffin, and Steve Swindells) have been in both groups. The band currently has only one former Hawkwind member, Jerry Richards, and it has evolved to include additional musicians who are not associated with Hawkwind.

== History ==
This version of Hawklords originated at a concert on 28 September 2008 organised by Nik Turner as a tribute to Robert Calvert. A group of musicians associated with Hawkwind formed a temporary band for the concert. Many of the same musicians reunited to play at the memorial concert for Barney Bubbles on 29 October 2009. After the success of this concert the decision was made to form a band to tour Europe. The band was named Hawklords after the temporary incarnation of Hawkwind formed in 1978.

With an evolving cast of musicians, this incarnation of Hawklords has released several original albums, starting with We Are One in 2012. Their 2016 album Fusion featured a guest appearance by Kim McAuliffe.

== Members ==
- Jerry Richards - guitar, vocals, SFX
- Dave Pearce - drums, percussion
- Kriss Gordelier - vocals
- Graham Manson - bass

=== Former members and affiliates ===
- Ron Tree
- Adrian Shaw
- Steve Swindells
- Nik Turner
- Meurig Griffiths
- Alan Davey
- Harvey Bainbridge
- Martin Griffin
- Tom Ashurst
- Mr Dibs
- Phillip Reeves ("Dead Fred")
- Chris Purdon (“Chris Mekon”)

== Discography ==
- We Are One – 2012
- Dream – 2013
- Censored – 2014
- R:Evolution – 2015
- Fusion – 2016
- Six – 2017
- Brave New World – 2018
- Heaven's Gate – 2019
- Time – 2021
- Space - 2023
- Relativity - 2024
- Faith - 2025
