= The Earth Ritual Preview =

EP by Hawkwind
- Released: 2 March 1984
- Recorded: Berry Studios, December 1983
- Genre: Space rock
- Label: Flicknife Records
- Producer: Hawkwind

Hawkwind EPs chronology
Sonic Assassins EP (1981)	The Earth Ritual Preview (1984)	The Early Years Live EP (1990)

The Earth Ritual Preview is a 1984 (see 1984 in music) EP by the English space rock group Hawkwind. It spent two weeks on the UK singles chart peaking at #86. The EP is included on the remastered version of The Chronicle of the Black Sword album.

The EP was a taster for a proposed full blown Earth Ritual album and tour, that would have involved Robert Calvert and Barney Bubbles, as a follow-up to 1972's Space Ritual. However, the project was delayed in favour of The Chronicle of the Black Sword collaboration with Michael Moorcock, then abandoned following Calvert's death in August 1988. The EP is dedicated to Bubbles, who committed suicide just prior to its release.

The group's line-up was in flux at the time, with guitarists Dave Brock and Huw Lloyd-Langton and bassist Harvey Bainbridge being the constant. Saxophonist Nik Turner and keyboardist Dead Fred had joined the group, although neither appeared on any of these recordings, they were part of the touring group. Former bassist Lemmy makes a guest appearance on "Night of the Hawks".

The group had tried a succession of drummers: Andy Anderson had been suitable but left to join The Cure; Lloyd-Langton Group drummer John Clark plays on "Dragons and Fables", but Brock felt he was unsuitable for the group; drum technician Robert Heaton plays on "Green Finned Demon", but he was committed to his own group New Model Army; and the track "Night of the Hawk" uses a drum loop. For the tour, Rick Martinez drummed but he was replaced part way through by Clive Deamer.

The group undertook a 35 date UK tour in February and March 1984 to promote the album, with support from Bronz. Various former members, including Lemmy, Moorcock and Dave Anderson, made guest appearances at various shows. The Ipswich Gaumont show on 9 March was filmed and released as Night of the Hawks.

== Track listing ==
A-Side
No.	Title	Writer(s)	Length
1.	"Night of the Hawks"	Julian Bishop	5:06

B-Side
No.	Title	Writer(s)	Length
1.	"Green Finned Demon"	Calvert, Brock	6:05
2.	"Dream Dancers"	Brock, Bainbridge	1:28
3.	"Dragons & Fables"	Lloyd, Langton	3:21

- The 7" single version features a shortened version of "Night of the Hawks" and "Green Finned Demon" as the sole B-side track

== Personnel ==
- Dave Brock - guitar, keyboards, vocals
- Harvey Bainbridge - bass guitar, keyboards, vocals
- Huw Lloyd-Langton - guitar, vocals

guests

- Lemmy - bass guitar on "Night of the Hawks"
- Rob Heaton - drums on "Green Finned Demon"
- John Clark - drums on "Dragons & Fables"
