= Ultrazang =

Monthly live music event in Ipswich, England

The Ultrazang Circus performs
- Genre: Rock, world, electronic, Reggae, folk, hip hop
- Dates: First Friday of each month
- Locations: Ipswich, Suffolk, England, United Kingdom
- Years active: Since June 2009
- Founders: Chris Hollands
- Website: ultrazang.co.uk

Ultrazang is a monthly event in Ipswich in England, now an established live music night which has played host to many local bands and provided a place for touring bands to play in that town. The night is known for having an eclectic line-up of music, catering for all genres and age ranges.

The entertainment for each event has a festival format, bringing together live bands, acoustic acts, DJs, spoken-word performances, dance routines, live percussion performances and circus skill performances.

== Music ==
Ultrazang features performances across various musical genres, including unsigned local bands, some of which have performed for larger audiences at the event.

At the same time, there have been larger bands play, including Gunslinger, the band formed by Ex-Hawkwind bassist Alan Davey, which saw the venue packed past capacity.

The night also features acoustic acts, which range from folk to blues, and the DJs who play tend to play more offbeat sets, including psy-ethnic and world music.

Some of the bands to play so far include: Hobomolobo, The Umbrella Assassins, The Fuzz, Man From Reno, Smaller Than You, The Looshkins, Seratoner, Voodoo's Child, Clickshaft, Hair Traffic Control, The Phantom Players, Howling for Heaven, The Popes of Chillitown, Kunk, Hayze, A World Apart, Smackjoint, The Varma Pilots, Ska-pa, The Moon, Gunslinger, Alpha Road, Avondale 45, Tru-Beat, The Brewer Street Kazoo Band, The Circle Experience, Smaller Than You, Stand Still Kid, The Cosmic Sands, Inter City Crazy Train, The Loyal Few, Crab Meat Moon, Jack Knife Horsebox, Ipswich African Drum Circle, Rob Crabbe, Joe Bedford and Michelle Nichols.

== Promotions ==
The company behind the event is Ultrazang Promotions, which consists of the local psychedelic rock band Hobomolobo, who play at the Ultrazang event most months. Ultrazang Promotions also plays host to other nights in different venues, including The Marque in Norwich, and more specific genre-based nights, such as Ultrazang Presents Ska Frenzy.

== Events ==
Ultrazang's ethic is always to be trying something new, so many different theme nights have taken place including The Masked Ball and Ultra Hippy night. There have also been charity events raising money for charities such as The Willow Foundation.

== Press ==
Ultrazang has been featured in many local publications and on local websites, as it is one of the very few places in Ipswich that draws much of a crowd for live music. It was featured by the BBC on its website Here and also featured a lot on BBC Radio Suffolk's Introducing show, mainly because the night helps promote unsigned talent and because it is also managing to feature national acts such as Gunslinger.
