= GWR Records =

- Founded: 1986
- Founder: Doug Smith, Ray Richards
- Status: Defunct
- Distributor(s): Roadrunner Records (Europe), Enigma Records (US)
- Genre: Heavy metal, thrash metal, space rock, punk rock
- Country of origin: United Kingdom
- Location: London

GWR Records was an independent record label active in the UK from 1986 through to 1991.

By 1984, Gerry Bron's Bronze Records was in financial difficulty leading to a hiatus in recording activity for Motörhead. Eventually, Motörhead managers Douglas Smith and Dave Simmons bought the band out of its contract and Bron subsequently sold the Bronze Records rights onto Legacy Records owner Ray Richards.

Richards then contacted Smith with a proposal for a joint venture to release new product by Motörhead, leading to the formation of GWR Records (named after Smith's business address of 15 Great Western Road). In addition to Motörhead, the label mainly released product by acts associated with Smith, such as Girlschool, Fastway, Hawkwind, Tank, Atomgods and Anti-Nowhere League, and bands from the thrash metal scene.

By 1992, Smith had been ousted as a managing director of the company and the label's catalogue was absorbed into Castle Communications, which later became part of Sanctuary Records Group.

== Albums ==
- GWS1 – Hawkwind – Live Chronicles – 1986
- GWRGBS1 – Various Artists – Bristol Custom Bike Show – 1986
- GWLP1 – Motörhead – Orgasmatron – 1986
- GWLP2 – Girlschool – Nightmare at Maple Cross – 1986
- GWLP3 – Jon Mikl Thor – Recruits – Wild In the Streets – 1986
- GWLP4 – Motörhead – Overkill – re-issue 1986
- GWLP5 – Motörhead – Bomber – re-issue 1986
- GWLP6 – Motörhead – Ace of Spades – re-issue 1986
- GWLP7 – Motörhead – No Sleep 'til Hammersmith – re-issue 1986
- GWLP8 – Wendy O. Williams – Maggots: The Record – licensed 1987
- GWLP9 – Cro-Mags – The Age of Quarrel – licensed 1987
- GWLP10 – Sword – Metalized – licensed 1987
- GWLP11 –
- GWLP12 – Anti-Nowhere League – Perfect Crime – 1987
- GWLP13 – Tritonz – The Edge Of Hell – 1987
- GWLP14 – Motörhead – Rock 'n' Roll – 1987
- GWLP15 – Living Death - Protected from Reality - licensed 1987
- GWLP16 – Holy Moses - Queen of Siam - licensed 1987
- GWLP17 – Mekong Delta – Mekong Delta – licensed 1987
- GWLP18 –
- GWLP19 – Holy Moses - Finished with the Dogs - licensed 1987
- GWLP20 – Last Descendants – One Nation Under God – licensed 1988
- GWLP21 – Girlschool – Take a Bite – 1988
- GWLP22 – Fastway – On Target – 1988
- GWLP23 – Tank – Tank – 1988
- GWLP24 – King Kurt – The Last Will & Testicle – 1988
- GWLP25 – Mekong Delta – The Music of Erich Zann – licensed 1988
- GWLP26 – Hawkwind – The Xenon Codex – 1988
- GWLP27 – Lloyd Langton Group – Time Space and LLG – 1988
- GWLP28 – Batfish – Batfish Brew – 1988
- GWLP29 – Texas Instruments – Texas Instruments – 1988
- GWLP30 – Atomgods – WOW! – 1988
- GWLP31 – Motörhead – No Sleep at All – 1988
- GWLP32 – Andrea Black - Andrea Black - 1988
- GWLP33 – Deathwish – Demon Preacher – 1988
- GWLP34 –
- GWLP35 – Killer Dwarfs - Killer Dwarfs - licensed 1988
- GWLP36 – Miss Daisy – Pizza Connection – 1989
- GWLP37 – Elvis Hitler – Disgraceland – 1989
- GWLP38 – The Pandoras - Rock Hard – licensed 1989
- GWLP39 – The Vandals - Slippery When Ill - licensed 1989
- GWLP41 – Mass – Take You Home – licensed 1989
- GWLP42 – Num Skull – Ritually Abused – licensed 1989
- GWLP43 – Social Distortion – Prison Bound – 1989
- GWLP44 – Wasted Youth – Black Daze – licensed 1989
- GWLP45 – Sword – Sweet Dreams – licensed 1989
- GWLP46 – Pajama Slave Dancers - Blood, Sweat and Beers - licensed 1989
- GWLP47 – Sacriliege BC – Too Cool to Pray – licensed 1989
- GWLP48 – SGM – Aggression – licensed 1989
- GWLP49 – 7 Seconds - Ourselves - licensed 1989
- GWLP50 – Personal Effects – Mana Fiesta – licensed 1989
- GWLP51 –
- GWLP52 – T.S.O.L. - Beneath the Shadows - reissue 1989
- GWLP53 – Ronnie Montrose – The Speed of Sound – 1989
- GWLP101 – Motörhead – The Birthday Party - 1990
- GWLP102 – Helix – Back for Another Taste – 1990
- GWLP103 – Hawkwind – Space Bandits – 1990
- GWLP104 – Hawkwind – Palace Springs – 1991
- GWLP??? – Atomgod – History Re-Written – 1991

== Singles ==
- GWR1 – Girlschool – "I'm the Leader of the Gang" / "Never Too Late" – 1986
- GWR2 – Motörhead – "Deaf Forever" / "On the Road" (live) / 12" only: "Steal Your Face" (live) – 1986
- GWR3 – Jon Mikl Thor – "Wild in the Streets" – 1986
- GWR4 – Würzel – "Bess" / "Midnight in London" / "People Say I'm Crazy" / "E.S.P." – 1987
- GWR5 –
- GWR6 – Motörhead – "Eat the Rich" / "Cradle to the Grave" / 12" only: "Just 'Cos You Got the Power" – 1987
- GWR7 – Batfish Boys – "Bomb Song" – 1987
- GWR8 – Fastway – "A Fine Line" – 1988
- GWR9 – The Kurts – "Bye Bye Baby" / "Prussian Stomp" – 1988
- GWR10 –
- GWR11 –
- GWR12 – Tokyo – "Listen to Your Heartbeat" / "Satisfaction Guaranteed" / "Sixteen" – 1988
- GWR13 –
- GWR14 –
- GWR15 – Motörhead – "Ace of Spades" (live) / "Dogs" (live) / "Traitor" (live) (Withdrawn) – 1988

== See also ==
- List of record labels
