= Purple Pyramid Records =

American independent record label

- Parent company: Cleopatra Records
- Founded: 2000
- Founder: Brian Perera
- Distributor: The Orchard
- Genre: Psychedelic rock, progressive rock, space rock
- Country of origin: U.S.
- Location: Los Angeles, California
- Official website: www.cleopatrarecords.com

Purple Pyramid Records is a sub-label to Cleopatra Records that focuses on progressive rock and psychedelic music. The label began in 2000 with a series of releases by guitarist Allan Holdsworth, Jon Anderson, and Hawkwind co-founder Nik Turner. The label expanded its roster with releases by Yes, Rick Wakeman, Steve Howe, Santana, Amon Düül II, Nektar, Brainticket, Tangerine Dream, Alan Davey, L. Shankar, and Quicksilver Messenger Service as well as projects by producer Billy Sherwood dubbed The Prog Collective, (featuring members of Asia, King Crimson, Mahavishnu Orchestra, and Gong), and The Fusion Syndicate (featuring Rick Wakeman, Steve Stevens, Billy Cobham, and Steve Morse).

== See also ==
- List of record labels
