= Palace Springs =

Live album by Hawkwind
- Released: 3 June 1991
- Recorded: 10 October 1989
- Venue: Palace Theatre, Los Angeles
- Genre: Space rock
- Length: 45:22
- Label: GWR
- Producer: Hawkwind

Hawkwind chronology
Space Bandits (1990)	Palace Springs (1991)	Electric Tepee (1992)

Professional ratings
Review scores
Source	Rating
AllMusic	2/5 stars
The Encyclopedia of Popular Music	2/5 stars

Palace Springs is a 1991 live/studio album by the English space rock group Hawkwind.

Although released in 1991, this album was recorded in 1989 prior to the previous album Space Bandits. The first two tracks had been recorded with a mobile studio, while the remainder were recorded during a tour of North America.

== Background ==
The live tracks were recorded during the band's 1989 tour of North America, their first tour there since the late 1970s. The Minneapolis show was issued as a double CD in 2008 by Voiceprint.

=== Set ===
The full set typically ran as "Magnu", "Down Through The Night", "Treadmill", "Time We Left"/"Heads", "Hassan I Sabbah", "Wind Of Change", "Assault and Battery", "The Golden Void", "Back In The Box"/"Arrival In Utopia", "Brainstorm", "Dream Worker" and "Damnation Alley" with an encore of "Needle Gun" and/or "Ejection".

=== Tour dates ===
- 24 September: Toronto, Diamond
- 26 September: Washington, 9:30 Club
- 27 September: Sommerville, Johnny D's
- 28 September: New York, New Ritz
- 29 September: Ardmore, 23 East Cabaret
- 30 September: Cleveland, Phantasy Theater
- 1 October: Chicago, Lounge Axe
- 3 October: Milwaukee, Odd Rock Cafe
- 4 October: Minneapolis, First Avenue
- 7 October: San Francisco, Stone
- 9 October: Santa Clara, One Step Beyond
- 10 October: Los Angeles, Palace
- 12 October: San Diego, Bacchanal

Atomhenge bonus CD tracks 1–11 was released in USA as California Branstorm in July 1992 (Iloki – ILCD1014), and in UK December 1994 (Cyclops – CYCL-015) including track 12 as a bonus track.

== Track listing ==
=== Side 1 ===
1. "Back in the Box" (Harvey Bainbridge, Dave Brock, Alan Davey, Bridget Wishart) – 6:21
2. "Treadmill" (Brock) – 8:09
3. "Assault and Battery" [listed as "Lives of Great Men"] (Brock) – 3:26
4. "The Golden Void" [listed as "Void of Golden Light"] (Brock) – 6:51

=== Side 2 ===
5. "Time We Left (This World Today)" (Brock) / "Heads" (Brock, Roger Neville-Neil) – 7:19
6. "Acid Test" [aka "Dream Worker"] (Bainbridge) – 6:01
7. "Damnation Alley" (Robert Calvert, Brock, Simon House) – 7:15

=== Atomhenge CD bonus tracks ===
9. "The Damage Of Life" (Brock) – 7:21
10. "Treadmill / Time We Left" [alternate version] (Brock) – 9:23

=== Atomhenge bonus CD: "California Brainstorm" ===
1. "Void's End" (Dave Brock) – 5:28
2. "Ejection" (Robert Calvert) – 5:58
3. "Brainstorm" (Nik Turner) – 8:51
4. "Out Of The Shadows" (Bridget Wishart, Brock, Alan Davey) – 8:27
5. "Eons" [aka "Snake Dance"] (Davey, Brock, Harvey Bainbridge, Richard Chadwick) – 4:16
6. "Night Of The Hawks" (Brock) – 5:24
7. "TV Suicide" (Bainbridge) – 7:09
8. "Back In The Box" (Davey, Wishart, Brock, Bainbridge, Chadwick) – 9.13
9. "Assassins Of Allah" (Brock, Calvert) – 3:51
10. "Propaganda" (Brock) – 1:07
11. "Reefer Madness" (Brock, Calvert) – 8:28
12. "Images" (Wishart, Brock, Davey) – 6:17

=== Notes ===
Disc one:

- "Assault and Battery" and "The Golden Void" were renamed for publishing purposes. However, in renaming the tracks, their titles were erroneously transposed.
- Although "Heads" forms the middle section of "Time We Left (This World Today)", it is banded as a separate track on the CD.
- "Damnation Alley" has a different middle section to the Quark, Strangeness and Charm studio version, this one being a reggae influenced piece that would be worked into "The Camera That Could Lie" from It Is the Business of the Future to Be Dangerous album.

== Credits and personnel ==
Hawkwind

- Bridget Wishart – vocals
- Dave Brock – electric guitar, keyboards, vocals
- Harvey Bainbridge – keyboards, vocals
- Alan Davey – bass guitar, vocals
- Simon House – violin
- Richard Chadwick – ddrums

Credits

- Disc one: Tracks 3–7 recorded live at Palace Theatre, Los Angeles, California, US, 10 October 1989
- Disc two: Recorded live at Omni Theatre, Oakland, California, US, 16 December 1990

== Charts ==
Chart performance for Palace Springs
Chart (2026)	Peak position
UK Rock & Metal Albums (OCC)	23

== Release history ==
- June 1991: GWR, GWLP104, UK
- July 1992: Castle Communications, CLACD303, UK/Germany
- July 1999: Castle Communications, ESMCD739, UK CD digipak
- November 2012: Atomhenge (Cherry Red) Records, ATOMCD 21034
