= Zeitgeist (disambiguation) =

Zeitgeist is the intellectual fashion or dominant school of thought of a certain period.

Zeitgeist may also refer to:

== Music ==
=== Groups ===
- Zeitgeist (ensemble), a music ensemble from St. Paul, Minnesota
- former name of the band The Reivers from Austin, Texas

=== Albums and songs ===
- Zeitgeist (Levellers album) (1995)
- Zeitgeist (Schiller album) (1999)
- Zeitgeist (The Smashing Pumpkins album) (2007)
- Zeitgeist, an EP by Tangerine Dream (2010)
- Zeitgeist, an album by Camo & Krooked (2013)
- "Zeitgeist", a song by Black Sabbath from the album 13 (2013)

== Other uses ==
- Zeitgeist (comics), a Marvel comic book superhero
- Zeitgeist (film company), a Danish independent film company
- Zeitgeist (film series), a series of films by Peter Joseph (2007–2011)
  - The Zeitgeist Movement, a social movement associated with Peter Joseph and his film series
- Zeitgeist (free software), a GNOME 3.0 activity logging system similar to Lifestream
- Zeitgeist Films, an American independent film company
- Zeitgeist, a 2000 novel by Bruce Sterling
- Zeitgeist, a satirical video blog hosted by Willie Geist
- Google Zeitgeist (2005), a Google report of the fastest changing and most popular online searches
- Jupiter Strike, a 1995 video game released as Zeitgeist in Japan

== See also ==
- Zeigeist, a Swedish electronic music band and art constellation (2006–2009)
- Epochalism, an attitude of respect for the progressive spirit of the age and for social and technological advancement
- Spirit of the age (disambiguation)
