= Adrian Shaw =

Adrian Shaw may refer to:

- Adrian Shaw (cricketer) (born 1972), English cricketer
- Adrian Shaw (footballer) (born 1966), English professional football player and coach
- Adrian Shaw (musician) (born 1947), English musician
