= The Speed of Sound (album) =

Studio album by Ronnie Montrose
- Released: March 1988
- Genre: Instrumental rock
- Length: 38:32
- Label: Enigma Records
- Producer: Ronnie Montrose

Ronnie Montrose chronology
Mean (1987)	The Speed of Sound (1988)	The Diva Station (1990)

The Speed of Sound is a 1988 all-instrumental album by American rock guitarist Ronnie Montrose, who led the bands Montrose (1973-77 & 1987) and Gamma (1979-83 & 2000) and also performed and did session work with a variety of musicians, including Van Morrison (1971–72), Herbie Hancock (1971), Beaver & Krause (1971), Boz Scaggs (1971), Edgar Winter (1972 & 1996), Gary Wright (1975), The Beau Brummels (1975), Dan Hartman (1976), Tony Williams (1978), The Neville Brothers (1987), Marc Bonilla (1991 & 1993), Sammy Hagar (1997), and Johnny Winter. In 1997, Ronnie stated that this album was his favorite instrumental record he had done so far. The track titles are words and phrases referencing aviation themes.

In 1999, Ronnie Montrose himself re-released a limited edition of 500 compact discs that were each numbered and autographed and came with a certificate of authenticity through his own company RoMoCo. The CD had different artwork on the jewel case as well as the insert which was numbered as well.

Professional ratings
Review scores
Source	Rating
AllMusic	link

== Track listing ==
1. "Mach 1" (Ronnie Montrose) – 4:27
2. "Black Box" (Montrose) – 4:40
3. "Hyper-Thrust" (Montrose) – 3:25
4. "Monolith" (Montrose) – 3:15
5. "Zero G" (Montrose) – 4:18
6. "Telstar" (Joe Meek / The Tornados cover) – 3:11
7. "Sidewinder" (Montrose) – 3:54
8. "Windshear" (Montrose) – 4:16
9. "VTOL" (Montrose) – 3:05
10. "Outer Marker Inbound" (Montrose) – 4:34

== Personnel ==
- Ronnie Montrose – guitar, percussion, MIDI guitar synthesizer
- Glenn Letsch – bass guitar
- Johnny Badanjek – drums
- Patrick Feehan – synthesizer on "Zero G" and "Outer Marker Inbound"

== Production ==
- Produced by Ronnie Montrose
- Engineered by Ronnie Montrose and Roger Wiersema
