= Huw Lloyd-Langton =

English guitarist (1951–2012)

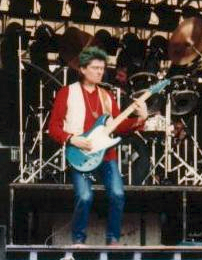
- Lloyd-Langton on stage with Hawkwind at Donington 1982

Background information
- Born: Richard Hugh Lloyd-Langton; 6 February 1951; Harlesden, London, England
- Died: 6 December 2012 (aged 61)
- Genres: Progressive rock, space rock
- Occupations: Guitarist
- Years active: 1960s–2012
- Formerly of: Hawkwind, Budgie
- Website: huwlloyd-langton.co.uk

Richard Hugh "Huw" Lloyd-Langton (6 February 1951 – 6 December 2012) was an English musician, best known as the guitarist for the rock band Hawkwind at various times. He also had his own band, the Lloyd Langton Group, and was the session lead guitarist for the Meads of Asphodel.

== Biography ==
Lloyd-Langton was born in Harlesden, north-west London, on 6 February 1951. After leaving school, he worked for an electrical contractor for a while, then worked at the Ivor Mairants Musicentre. He first met Dave Brock, later of Hawkwind, when he used to came in to the Musicentre to buy guitar strings. Lloyd-Langton's first significant professional guitar playing was in the backing band for singer Winston G, with whom he toured Germany for six months in 1969, aged eighteen. After returning to London in late 1969, he chanced on Brock, who had formed Hawkwind, while Brock was busking. Hawkwind were auditioning guitarists to replace Mick Slattery, who had left the band, and Brock invited him to audition. Lloyd-Langton's girlfriend Marion Chamberlain knew a guitarist from Switzerland who also auditioned, and when Lloyd-Langton won the role, the other guitarist accused her of tipping Lloyd-Langton off to the audition he had been going to.

Lloyd-Langton played on the band's first album, Hawkwind, before leaving them. Most members of Hawkwind were heavy users of psychedelic drugs such as LSD and mescaline. For a while they spiked the drinks of people who did not want to use the drugs. Bass player John Harrison was not keen on the drugs, and avoided offers of drinks of fear they had been spiked, but eventually someone spiked his drink with mescaline, and he left the band. Lloyd-Langton had taken LSD, but had a bad trip in which he thought he had died and gone to an unpleasant place, so had decided not to use it again. Hawkwind performed at the Isle of Wight Festival in August 1970, playing in an inflatable dome outside the main festival venue. Someone spiked Lloyd-Langton's drink with LSD shortly before they went on stage and he had a bad trip in which he felt he had descended into hell. Halfway through the performance he got down on his knees and prayed "that God would forgive me and release me from this situation". After the set he walked into the sea and baptised himself, remaining a Christian thereafter. Marred by the LSD experience, he left the band, and a while later had a nervous breakdown.

He and Chamberlain married in 1971. He played guitar for Widowmaker, Budgie, and Leo Sayer in the 1970s, then rejoined Hawkwind in 1979, appearing on the Live Seventy Nine album release from that year and the subsequent Levitation album. He continued performing with Hawkwind until 1988, after which he made occasional guest appearances, then rejoined for a brief spell in 2001–2002 until ill health (Legionnaires' disease) forced him to leave once more. He sometimes played solo as an acoustic support act for Hawkwind, including at The Brook in Southampton in December 2009. Acoustic slots at English charity (playing for free) and space rock events were also common throughout this decade.

Lloyd-Langton's health had been generally poor for a decade and he was quite frail, with several broken bones and minor injuries (rarely letting fans down though – he once played a gig with a broken arm, reworking his solos on the fly so that he could play them in one area of the guitar neck). He died at his home on 6 December 2012, aged 61 years old, after a two-year fight with cancer. His final recording with Hawkwind was a re-recording of "Hurry On Sundown", which appears the 2026 compilation album Psychedelic Selection.

== Equipment ==
Lloyd-Langton used a guitar Roland Bolt amplifier in the beginning of his career until the early 1980s

== Discography ==
=== Hawkwind ===
- 1970: Hawkwind
- 1980: Live Seventy Nine
- 1980: Levitation
- 1981: Sonic Attack
- 1982: Church of Hawkwind
- 1982: Choose Your Masques
- 1983: Zones
- 1984: The Earth Ritual Preview
- 1984: This Is Hawkwind, Do Not Panic
- 1985: The Chronicle of the Black Sword
- 1986: Live Chronicles (vocals on "Moonglum")
- 1987: Out & Intake
- 1988: The Xenon Codex
- 2012: Onward
- 2013: Spacehawks
- 2026: Psychedelic Selection

=== Widowmaker ===
- 1976: Widowmaker
- 1977: Too Late to Cry

=== Lloyd-Langton Group ===
- 1984: Outside the Law (Deprecated as a bootleg on Lloyd-Langton's official site.)
- 1984 "Dreams that fade away" / "It's on Me" – 12 single. Limited edition. Ultra noise records.
- 1985: Night Air ( original release on vinyl in 1985, Re-released in a cd version 28 June 2010.)
- 1987: Like An Arrow
- 1988: Time Space & LLG
- 1991: Elegy
- 1994: River Run
- 1999: Chain Reaction
- 2001: On The Move... Plus
- 2010: Hard Graft
- 2011: Classical Guitar Tales

=== Contributions ===
- 1980: Steve Swindells – Fresh Blood
