= Dumpy's Rusty Nuts =

British rock band

Dumpy at Coventry's General Wolfe 1985

Dumpy's Rusty Nuts were a British rock band founded in 1981 by the lead singer Graham "Dumpy" Dunnell (born 27 July 1949, London, England). Though unsuccessful as recording artists the band have been a successful and popular live act for decades. The band attracted a cult following for their live performances in small rock venues. Their initial audiences were drawn from the new wave of British heavy metal and 'Bikers' and they became particularly well known at the London Marquee Club, where they were a regular and popular attraction. In the early to mid-1980s the band toured extensively around the UK playing at small rock/'Biker' pub and club venues including the Isle of Man TT, and music festivals, cementing their name and following.

The band were not successful recording artists, preferring to concentrate on live work. They released a debut single "Just For Kicks" in June 1982 but in order to get airplay from the BBC, the band had to change their name to "Dumpy's Rusty Bolts". Sales of the single were poor, and the original band name was restored. A second single, "Box Hill Or Bust", was released. Subsequent sporadic releases have only found favour with their small core audience.

They released a double live album, Somewhere in England in 1984, which was recorded at the Marquee Club. This was followed up by two studio albums, Hot Lover and Get Out on the Road! but they didn't sell as well, so the next release was a second live album entitled Firkin Well Live (Somewhere Else In England) which was recorded at the Fleece and Firkin in Bristol UK, featuring Alan Davey from Hawkwind on bass. In 1990, they released a cover version of the song "Run Run Run" (originally recorded by Jo Jo Gunne in 1972).

Despite the group's longevity, they became for a time a favourite target for mockery from the British music press, especially Melody Maker, where they were regularly portrayed as claiming to be jumping on the latest improbable bandwagon in the humorous section "Talk Talk Talk" written by David Stubbs.

As of 2010, the band were still performing in small venues, music festivals and bike rallies across Europe. The band has toured with and supported many bands including Hawkwind, Motörhead and Status Quo.

== Discography ==
- "Just For Kicks" - 7" single (1982)
- "Box Hill Or Bust" - 7" single (1982)
- Somewhere in England - double album (1984)
- Hot Lover - album (1986)
- Get Out on the Road! - album (1987)
- Firkin Well Live - double album (1988)

== See also ==
- List of new wave of British heavy metal bands
