= Hawkwind videography =

The British space rock group Hawkwind have been active since 1969, but their earliest video release is Night Of The Hawk from their Earth Ritual Tour recorded at Ipswich on 9 March 1984. Since then, there have been numerous video releases covering the evolution of the band; some are professional broadcast shoots, others commercial, and a few are amateur.

There have also been some live video shoots of the band during the 1970s, although none have seen a commercial release. These include an early 12 April 1970 The Roundhouse, London performance and a Hawklords performance at Brunel University, Uxbridge on 24 November 1978.

The Hawkestra event, a reunion featuring appearances from all past and present members on 21 October 2000 at the Brixton Academy, was professionally filmed but disputes between band members would indicate any forthcoming release unlikely.

== Promotional ==
=== Space Ritual ===
- Tracks: "Silver Machine"; "Urban Guerilla"
- Personnel: Robert Calvert – Vocals; Dave Brock – Guitar, Vocals; Lemmy – Bass, Vocals; Nik Turner – Flute, Saxophone; Del Dettmar – Electronics; Dik Mik – Electronics; Simon King – Drums; Stacia – Dancing
- Recorded: Dunstable Civic Hall, 7 July 1972; Empire Pool, Wembley, 27 May 1973
- Released: June 2007, EMI Remasters [2CD+DVD]
- Notes: "Silver Machine" recorded for the BBC television programme Top of the Pops. The live performances have been overdubbed with the studio tracks.

== Live videos ==
=== Night Of The Hawks ===
- Tracks: "Ghost Dance"; "Watching The Grass Grow"; "Dream Worker"; "Ejection"; "Uncle Sam's On Mars"; "Martian Disco Stomp" [a.k.a. "The Iron Dream"]; "Brainstorm"; "Sonic Attack"; "The Island" [a.k.a. "Dust Of Time"]; "Brainstorm"; "Psi Power"; "Silver Machine"
- DVD bonus tracks: "Night Of The Hawk" [Promo]
- Personnel: Dave Brock – Guitar, Keyboards, Vocals; Harvey Bainbridge – Bass, Vocals; Huw Lloyd-Langton – Lead Guitar, Vocals; Dead Fred Reeves – Keyboards, violin; Nik Turner – Vocals, Sax; Clive Deamer – Drums
- Recorded: Earth Ritual Tour, Ipswich, 9 March 1984
- Released: Jettisoundz, JE123 [VHS Tape]; Visionary, VISDVD005 [DVD]

=== Stonehenge 1984 ===
- Tracks: "Ghost Dance"; "Watching the Grass Grow"; "Utopia"; "Social Alliance"; "Uncle Sam's on Mars"; "Sonic Attack"; "The Right Stuff"; "Dawn"; "In The Morning"
- 20th Anniversary DVD Edition: "Ghost Dance"; "Angels of Death"; "Born To Go"; "Watching the Grass Grow"; "Night of the Hawks"; "Utopia"; "Social Alliance"; "Motorway City"; "Ejection"; "Uncle Sam's on Mars"; "Brainstorm"; "Sonic Attack"; "The Right Stuff"; "Dawn"; "In The Morning"
- Personnel: Dave Brock – Guitar, Keyboards, Vocals; Alan Davey – Bass, Vocals; Huw Lloyd-Langton – Lead Guitar, Vocals; Harvey Bainbridge – Keyboards, Vocals; Nik Turner – Vocals, Sax; Danny Thompson Jr – Drums
- Recorded: Stonehenge Festival, 20 June 1984
- Released: Visionary, JE250 [VHS tape]; Cherry Red, CRDVD056 [DVD]

=== The Chronicle Of The Black Sword ===
- Tracks: "Song Of The Swords"; "Sea King"; "Master Of The Universe"; "Choose Your Masques"; "Needle Gun"; "Zarozinia"; "Lords Of Chaos"; "Brainstorm"; "Moonglum"; "Elric The Enchanter"; "Magnu"; "Horn Of Destiny" (a.k.a. "Horn Of Fate");
- DVD bonus tracks: "Coded Languages"; "Born To Go"; "Utopia"; "Levitation"; "Needle Gun" [Promo]
- Personnel: Dave Brock – Guitar, Keyboards, Vocals; Alan Davey – Bass, Vocals; Huw Lloyd-Langton – Lead Guitar, Vocals; Harvey Bainbridge – Keyboards, Vocals; Danny Thompson Jr – Drums; Michael Moorcock – Vocals (guest); Tony Crerar – mime & dance; Kris Tait – mime & dance, vocals; Tim Pollard – mime
- Recorded: Black Sword Tour, Hammersmith Odeon, 4 December 1985
- Released: Jettisoundz, JE150 [VHS tape]; Visionary, VVCD001 [Video CD]; Visionary, VISDVD002 [DVD]

=== Chaos ===
- Tracks: "Magnu"; "Angels of Death"; "Assault and Battery"; "The Blood of Man"; "Master of the Universe"; "Dreaming City"; "Utopia"; "Brainstorm"; "Sonic Attack"; "Assassins of Allah" [a.k.a. "Hassan I Sabbah"]
- Personnel: Dave Brock – Guitar, Keyboards, Vocals; Alan Davey – Bass, Vocals; Huw Lloyd-Langton – Lead Guitar, Vocals; Harvey Bainbridge – Keyboards, Vocals; Danny Thompson Jr – Drums
- Recorded: Chaos tour, Preston, 3 December 1986.
- Released: Visionary, JE287 [VHS Tape]; Cherry Red, CRDVD046 [DVD]

=== Treworgey Tree Fayre ===
- Tracks: "Instrumental"; "Brainstorm"; "Down Through The Night"; "Treadmill"; "Time We Left (This World Today)"; "Assassins of Allah" [a.k.a. "Hassan I Sabbah"]; "Assault and Battery"; "Golden Void"; "Back in the Box"; "Arrival in Utopia"; "You Know You're Only Dreaming"; "Damnation Alley"; "Needle Gun"; "Ejection"; "Lost Chronicles"
- Personnel: Bridget Wishart – Vocals; Dave Brock – Guitar, Keyboards, Vocals; Alan Davey – Bass, Vocals; Simon House – Violin; Harvey Bainbridge – Keyboards, Vocals; Richard Chadwick – Drums; Jerry Richards – guest guitar on 'Needle Gun'
- Recorded: Treworgey Tree Fayre, 29 July 1989
- Released: Taste 3 [VHS tape]; 2008, Voiceprint Records, HAWKVP47DVD [DVD]
- Note: This is amateur quality, shot from one fixed camera with the soundtrack recorded by the camera.
- Steve Bemand (credited in press releases for the DVD as playing guest guitar did play with Hawkwind at the festival, contributing lead guitar for their later set on the Travelers' stage).

=== USA Tour 1989-1990 ===
- Disc 1: "Introduction"; "Needle Gun"; "The Golden Void"; "Check Control"; "Ejection"; "Brainstorm"; "Your Secret's Safe With Me"; "Wings""; "Out of the Shadows"; "Snake Dance"; "Night of the Hawks"; "Star Song"; "TV Suicide"; "Back in the Box"
- Disc 2: "Master of the Universe"; "Assault and Battery"; "The Golden Void"; "Treadmill"; "Time We Left This World"; "Interview"; "Down Through The Night"; "Interview"; "Lost Chronicles"; "Needle Gun"; "Time We Left This World Today"; "Heads"; "Assassins of Allah"; "Images"; "Reefer Madness"
- Personnel: Dave Brock – Guitar, Keyboards, Vocals; Alan Davey – Bass, Vocals; Richard Chadwick – Drums; Harvey Bainbridge – Keyboards
- Recorded: USA tour, 1989–90
- Released: 2008, Voiceprint Records, HAWKVP48DVD [2DVD]

=== Nottingham 1990 ===
- Tracks: "Assault and Battery"; "Golden Void"; "Out of the Shadows"; "Eons" [a.k.a. "Snake Dance"]; "Night of the Hawks"; "Back in the Box"; "Utopia"; "Ejection"; "Damnation Alley"; "Wind of Change" [VHS Tape bonus track]
- Personnel: Bridget Wishart – Vocals; Dave Brock – Guitar, Keyboards, Vocals; Alan Davey – Bass, Vocals; Simon House – Violin; Harvey Bainbridge – Keyboards, Vocals; Richard Chadwick – Drums
- Recorded: Lenton Lane Studios, Nottingham, 25 January 1990.
- Released: Castle Communications, CMP6005 [VHS tape]; Classic Rock, CRL1558 [DVD PAL] CRL1559 [DVD NTSC]
- Note: This is a professional shoot originally made for broadcast on ITV's Bedrock series of concerts.

=== Bournemouth Academy ===
- Tracks: "Angels of Death"; "Golden Void"; "instrumental"; "Acid House Of Dreams" [a.k.a. "Dream Worker"]; "You Shouldn't Do That"; "Out Of The Shadows"; "Seventh Star"; "Night Of The Hawks"; "Back In The Box"; "Arrival In Utopia"; "Images"; "Assassins Of Allah" [a.k.a. "Hassan I Sabbah"]; "Brainstorm"; "Ejection"
- Personnel: Bridget Wishart – Vocals; Dave Brock – Guitar, Keyboards, Vocals; Alan Davey – Bass, Vocals; Harvey Bainbridge – Keyboards, Vocals; Richard Chadwick – Drums
- Recorded: Bournemouth Academy, 2 July 1990
- Released: Taste 19 [VHS tape]
- Note: This is amateur quality, shot from one fixed camera with the soundtrack recorded by the camera.

=== Brixton Academy ===
- Tracks: "Out Of The Shadows"; "Right To Decide"; "7 By 7"; "The Right Stuff"; "Spirit Of The Age"; "The Iron Dream"; "Secret Agent"; "Assassins Of Allah" [a.k.a. "Hassan I Sabbah"]; "Golden Void"; "LSD"; "Blue Shift"; "Brainstorm"; "Psi Power"; "Time We Left (This World Today)"; "Master Of The Universe"; "Welcome To The Future"
- Personnel: Dave Brock – Guitar, Keyboards, Vocals; Alan Davey – Bass, Vocals; Richard Chadwick – Drums; Salt Tank – Synths
- Recorded: Brixton Academy, 15 August 1992
- Released: Taste 33 [VHS tape]
- Note: This is amateur quality, shot from one fixed balcony camera (Sony 8mm) with the mono soundtrack recorded on that camera, mixed with the footage of a roving (S-VHS) camera, at front of house.

=== Love In Space ===
- Tracks: "Abducted"; "Death Trap"; "Wastelands" [a.k.a. "Wastelands Of Sleep"]; "Are You Losing Your Mind?"; "Photo Encounter"; "Blue Skin"; "Sputnik Stan"; "Robot"; "Alien"; "Xenomorph"; "Vega"; "Love In Space"; "Kapel"; "Elfin"; "Silver Machine"; "Welcome To The Future"; "Assassins Of Allah" [a.k.a. "Hassan I Sabbah"/"Space Is Their (Palestine)"]
- Personnel: Ron Tree – Vocals; Dave Brock – Guitar, Keyboards, Vocals; Alan Davey – Bass, Vocals; Richard Chadwick – Drums;
- Recorded: Alien 4 Tour, 1995
- Released: Visionary JE290 [VHS Tape]; Cherry Red, CRDVD035 [DVD]
- Notes: Also released as the double CD Love in Space.

=== Out Of The Shadows ===
- Tracks: "Earth Calling"/"Aerospace-Age Inferno"; "Angels Of Death"; "Out Of The Shadows"; "Time Captives"; "Master Of the Universe"; "Song Of The Gremlin"; "Time/Confusion"; "Hurry On Sundown"; "Lighthouse"; "The Watcher"; "Assassins Of Allah" [a.k.a. "Hassan I Sabbah"/"Space Is Their (Palestine)"]; "Earth Calling"/"You Shouldn't do That"; "Sonic Attack"/"Spacebrock"; "Silver Machine"
- Personnel: Dave Brock – Guitar, Keyboards, Vocals; Alan Davey – Bass, Vocals; Richard Chadwick – Drums; Huw Lloyd Langton – Lead Guitar; Tim Blake – Keyboards, Vocals; Arthur Brown – Guest Vocals
- Recorded: Newcastle Opera House, 4 December 2002
- Released: Secret Records, SECDVD110 [DVD]

=== Winter Solstice 2005 ===
- Tracks: "The Right Stuff"; "Sword of the East"; "Greenback Massacre"; "Out Here We Are"; "Angela Android"; "Love in Space"; "Paradox"; "Spirit of the Age"; "Psi Power"; "Assassins of Allah"; "Brainstorm"; "Psychedelic Warlords"; "Brainbox Pollution"
- Personnel: Dave Brock – Guitar, Keyboards, Vocals; Alan Davey – Bass, Vocals; Richard Chadwick – Drums; Jason Stuart – Keyboards; Jez Huggett – guest saxophone
- Recorded: Astoria Theatre, London, 21 December 2005
- Released: 2008, Voiceprint Records, HAWKVP44DVD [DVD]
- Note: This is amateur quality, shot from one fixed camera.

=== Space Melt ===
- Tracks: "Right Stuff"; "Psychedelic Warlords"; "Dogstar"; "Orgone Accumulator"; "Paradox"; "Robot"; "Out Here We Are"; "Greenback Massacre"; "Marine Snow"; "Lord Of Light"; "Images"; "Infinity"; "Assassins of Allah" [a.k.a. "Hassan I Sabbah"/"Space Is Their (Palestine)"]; "Motorhead"
- Personnel: Dave Brock – Guitar, Keyboards, Vocals; Alan Davey – Bass, Vocals; Richard Chadwick – Drums; Jason Stuart – Keyboards
- Recorded: Magna, Rotherham, 18 December 2006
- Released:
- Notes: Private release for fan club members only.

=== Knights of Space ===
- Tracks: "Black Corridor"; "Aero Space Age Inferno"; "Space Love"; "The Awakening"; "Orgone Accumulator"; "Paradox"; "Robot"; "Abducted"; "Alien (I Am)"; "Alien Poem"; "Master of the Universe"; "Time We Left"; "Lighthouse"; "Arrival in Utopia"; "Damnation Alley"; "Sonic Attack"; "Welcome to the Future"; "Flying Doctor"; "Silver Machine"
- Personnel: Dave Brock – Guitar, Keyboards, Vocals; Mr Dibs – Bass, Vocals; Richard Chadwick – Drums; Jason Stuart – Keyboards; Tim Blake – Keyboards, theremin
- Recorded: Astoria Theatre, London, 19 December 2007
- Released: 2008, EntertainME [DVD]
- Notes: Also released as the double CD Knights of Space.

=== Space Ritual Live ===
- Tracks: "Seasons"; "Steppenwolf"; "Utopia"; "Opa Loka"; "Spiral Galaxy"; "Reefer Madness"; "Sentinel"; "Spirit of the Age"; "Earth Calling"; "Born to Go"; "Down Through The Night"; "Poem 1st Landing"; "Lord of Light"; "Poem Black Corridor"; "Space Is Deep"; "A Step Into Space"; "Orgone Accumulator"; "Upside Down"; "10th Second of Forever"; "Brainstorm"; "Seven By Seven"; "Sonic Attack"; "Time We Left"; "Master of the Universe"; "Welcome to the Future"; "Silver Machine"
- Personnel: Dave Brock - Guitar, Vocals; Mr Dibs - Bass, Guitar, Vocals; Richard Chadwick - Drums, Vocals; Dead Fred - Keyboards, Violin; Tim Blake - Theremin, Synth; Niall Hone - Bass, Guitar, Vocals; John Etheridge - Lead Guitar, Brian Blessed - Vocals
- Recorded: O2 Shepherd's Bush, London, 22 February 2014
- Released: 2015, Gonzo Media [DVD] Deluxe set
- Notes: Also released as the double CD Space Ritual Live

== Various artists ==
=== Stonehenge 84 ===
- Tracks: Roy Harper: "One Man Rock'n'Roll Band"; "Commune"; "I Hate The White Man"; "Highway Blues";
  Hawkwind: "Ghost Dance"; "Angels Of Death"; "Watching the Grass Grow"; "Utopia"; "Social Alliance"; "Brainstorm";
  The Enid: "Sunrise"; "Song For Europe"; "Something Wicked This Way Comes"; "Wild Thing"
- Personnel: Dave Brock – Guitar, Keyboards, Vocals; Alan Davey – Bass, Vocals; Huw Lloyd-Langton – Lead Guitar, Vocals; Harvey Bainbridge – Keyboards, Vocals; Nik Turner – Vocals, Sax; Danny Thompson Jr – Drums
- Recorded: Stonehenge Festival, 20 June 1984
- Released: Visionary, JE134 [VHS tape]

=== Bristol Custom Bike Show ===
- Tracks: Hawkwind – "Master of the Universe"; Voodoo Child – "Lost In Heart"
- Personnel: Dave Brock – Guitar, Keyboards, Vocals; Alan Davey – Bass, Vocals; Huw Lloyd-Langton – Lead Guitar, Vocals; Harvey Bainbridge – Keyboards, Vocals; Danny Thompson Jr – Drums
- Recorded: Bristol Custom Bike Show, 20 June 1986
- Released: Jettisoundz, JE164 [VHS tape]
