= Griffin Music =

Griffin Music was an independent record label created in 1989 in Toronto, Ontario, Canada by author and publisher Robert Godwin. It was originally created to record and finance the second album of Led Zeppelin tribute act, Michael White & The White. During late 1989 and 1990, Godwin worked with Michael White and his band recording the album in studios such as Sunset Sound and United Western Recorders in Los Angeles and Metalworks Studios in Toronto.

The album was released as Griffin Music's first title in the spring of 1990. Having established the label with its first release, Godwin then pursued venerable British space rockers Hawkwind, finally securing the North American rights to two obscure albums in 1991. During the course of 1990, Godwin partnered the label with mega-distributor Feedback Incorporated of Chicago who took over the day-to-day operation of the label (headquartered in the suburb Lombard), while Godwin concentrated on finding artists and catalogs to sign to Griffin.

Between 1991 and 1995, Griffin Music would become one of the largest independent record labels in the United States, releasing back catalog of many European classic rock artists such as Anderson Bruford Wakeman Howe, Motörhead, Denny Laine, Roy Harper, Uriah Heep, Wishbone Ash, Rick Wakeman, Fish, Mike Oldfield, Jethro Tull, Pete Best, The Quarry Men, Budgie, XTC, Nazareth, Hawkwind, Tangerine Dream, Steve Hillage, Status Quo, Strawbs, UFO, The Sensational Alex Harvey Band and dozens of others.

In 1993, Griffin Music secured the license to manufacture and distribute a portion of the BBC in Concert series in North America. Later, Godwin and partner Neale Parker would form Griffin Video which would include many of the same bands' various concert videos.

The biggest release by Griffin Music came in March 1995 when the label released the first in what was to have been a multi-album deal, David Bowie's Santa Monica '72. The album shipped 25,000 units but was withdrawn after only four days. Despite Griffin paying a large advance for the Bowie catalog, the license was challenged and a lengthy litigation ensued with Griffin Music as the plaintiff. The remaining albums by David Bowie and John Mellencamp were never released. As a result of the drain on the company caused by the litigation Griffin Music was bought in 1997 by Tango Music after filing Chapter 11 bankruptcy.

On January 2, 2020, Griffin Music was registered as Griffin Music Group in Canada under new ownership and management (Ryan Harvey-MacIntyre) and operates once again as a Canadian independent record label. Although using the same name it has no connection with the original label.
