= Alan Davey (musician) =

British rock musician

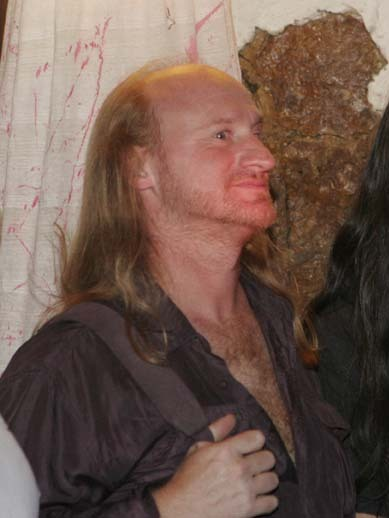
- Davey in 2005

Background information
- Born: 11 September 1963 (age 63); Ipswich, Suffolk, England
- Genres: Space rock, hard rock, heavy metal, proto-punk, acid rock, progressive rock, psychedelic rock, black metal
- Occupation: Musician
- Instruments: Bass, vocals, keyboards

Alan Davey (born 11 September 1963) is an English musician, best known as the former bassist with the rock band Hawkwind. He is the original bass player in Gunslinger which started in 1979 and is still the bass player and vocalist for Gunslinger. He has played and recorded with Meads of Asphodel, Dumpy's Rusty Nuts, Spirits Burning, Bedouin (1998–2003). He formed with the newly re-imagined Hawklords in 2008 with Nik Turner until 2012 and since then formed The Psychedelic Warlords in 2013 until 2015.

== Early musical career ==
Davey formed his first band, Gunslinger, in 1979 with his cousin Nigel Potter. Influenced by Led Zeppelin, Deep Purple, Motörhead and Hawkwind, amongst others, they gained a reputation for playing loud and built a solid following. They recorded a demo tape and a recording contract was promised, but the deal was never signed.

== Hawkwind ==
A long-time fan of Hawkwind, Davey had sent a tape of his playing to Dave Brock, and in 1984 Brock invited him to join the band after his debut at the Stonehenge Free Festival that year, moving Harvey Bainbridge from bass to keyboards in order to accommodate him, with Brock sacking keyboardist Dead Fred in the process. During this first tenure with Hawkwind they released seven studio albums and four live offerings. However, by 1996 Davey was unhappy with the musical direction of the band, and, following a tour of Greece, left to form his own Middle-Eastern flavoured hard-rock group, Bedouin, and a Motörhead tribute act named Ace of Spades. Bedouin had been the name of an Alan Davey solo album, and had a distinctive Arabic flavour to it; Davey built upon this, assembling his own band which toured the UK and Europe for several years, releasing one studio album and a live album. The group disbanded in 2003.

In October 2000, Davey was reunited with Hawkwind for the Hawkestra 30th anniversary event at the Brixton Academy, and in 2001, in another major line-up shift, rejoined the group, which led to the departure of Ron Tree and Jerry Richards. Davey's second tenure in Hawkwind saw the release of three live and two studio albums before he left the band again in June 2007, to perform and record with the re-formed Gunslinger and Meads of Asphodel.

== Other projects ==
Davey's first venture outside of the Hawkwind camp (whilst still in the band) was a brief stint helping out on bass duties in Dumpy's Rusty Nuts, in 1988. One of the gigs was recorded and released on Razor Records (RAZ D39): Firkin Well Live – Somewhere Else in England.

Davey has now released an album of Arabic-flavoured material with former Hawkwind vocalist Bridget Wishart.

March 2008 saw the release of the début album by Gunslinger entitled Earthquake in E Minor. The album featured some of the material that had been written between 1979 and 1982 during the band's first inception. In September 2011, Gunslinger embarked upon their first US tour. In March 2012, the band headlined the British Steel Festival VI at the Camden Underworld.

On 18 May 2009, Davey released the solo album entitled Eclectic Devils, on his own record label Earthquake Records. It included contributions from former Hawkwind violinist/keyboardist Simon House, Josh Dreamspirit, Nigel Potter, James Hodkinson, Louis Davey and Isobel from Bruise.

After his departure from Hawkwind, Davey was active in the reformed Hawklords band, consisting of several former members of Hawkwind. He joined the group for a one-off Barney Bubbles benefit show in 2009, a mini tour in 2010, and was part of the touring line-up for a major 2012 UK tour, sharing bass duties with Adrian Shaw. However, Davey did not appear on the subsequent Hawklords album "We Are One", and did not tour the album in September/October 2012 either.

In 2012, the band The Psychedelic Warlords were formed – featuring Alan Davey, Vince Cory, Meurig Griffiths, Radio Ray, Rich Om and Nigel Ward, with a plan to tour into 2013 as an anniversary celebration of Hawkwind's Space Ritual album – playing the album in its entirety. The 2013 tour, which eventually saw several line-up changes, included dates in the UK, and a headline act at the Roadburn Festival in The Netherlands. In 2014, Davey took The Psychedelic Warlords on tour once more, again with nearly a completely new line-up, this time fronted by vocalist and saxophonist Craig High, who had fronted the band during the latter part of the 2013 tour. The 2014 tour saw the band playing two classic albums in their near entirety, Robert Calvert's album Captain Lockheed and the Starfighters, and Hawkwind's Hall of the Mountain Grill.

Davey has also done music for three movies and is currently working on a fourth project. In 2018, he joined Paul Rudolph, original singer and guitarist of Pink Fairies and Lucas Fox, the first Motörhead drummer, to record the album Resident Reptiles under the Pink Fairies name for Cleopatra Records.

== Discography ==
=== Albums ===
- Captured Rotation (1996 Emergency Broadcast System, 2006 Hawkwind Records)
- Bedouin (1997 Emergency Broadcast System, 2002 Hawkwind Records)
- Bedouin Sampler (1997) (12", MiniAlbum, Promo, Blu)
- Chaos Delight (2000 Black Widow Records, CD/LP)
- Al Chemical's Lysergic Orchestra (2001 Alan Davey, 2010 Earthquake Records remastered with 5 bonus tracks)
- The Final Call (2001 Centaur Discs – CENCD 029)
- Human On The Outside (2007 Alan Davey – AD-HOTO CD/LP)
- Earthquake in E Minor (2008 as Gunslinger)
- Eclectic Devils (2009 Earthquake Records – EQRCD0002 – CD, 2010 Bloodrock Records – BRR 006 – LP)
- Unlawful Odds (2011 Flicknife Records – CD/download)
- Last Wish (2011 with Bridget Wishart as Djinn - CD/Digital)
- Cyber Tooth (2012 Earthquake Records – EQRCD0007 – CD/LP, 2017 Purple Pyramid Records – CLO 0547 – CD)
- Al Chemical's Lysergic Orchestra Volume 2 (2013 Earthquake Records – EQRCD010 – CD)
- Sputnik Stan Vol.1: A Fistful Of Junk (2015 Earthquake Records – two versions)
- Alan Davey's Bedouin: Time Is Made of Gold (2019 Purple Pyramid Records – CLO 1175 – CD)

=== As Hawkestrel ===
- Hawkestrel: The Future is Us (2019 Cleopatra Records – CLO1235 – CD/LP/Digital)
- Hawkestrel: Pioneers of Space (2020 Purple Pyramid Records – CD/LP/Digital)
- Hawkestrel: SpaceXMas (2020 Purple Pyramid Records) – CD/LP/Digital)
- Hawkestrel: Chaos Rocks (2024 Purple Pyramid Records – CD/LP/Digital)
- Hawkestrel presents Pre-Med (2020 Purple Pyramid Records – 3CD/Digital) with Danny Faulkner
- Hawkestrel presents Pre-Med: Old Habits Die Hard (2024 Cleopatra Records – CD/LP/Digital) with Danny Faulkner

=== Singles and EPs ===
- The Elf EP (1987 Hawkfan – HWFB3 / HWFB4 – 2x7")
- Lessons In Logic (2012 Flicknife Records) Three tracks

=== Live albums ===
- Alan Davey's Psychedelic Warlords: Hall Of The Mountain Grill (2019 Purple Pyramid Records – CD/LP/Digital)
- Alan Davey's Psychedelic Warlords: Captain Lockheed & The Starfighters (2019 Purple Pyramid Records – CD/LP/Digital)

=== Compilations ===
- Four-Track Mind (Volume 1) (2007 Alan Davey – AD4TM-1 – CDR)
- Four-Track Mind (Volume 2) (2008 Alan Davey – AD4TM-2 – CDR)
- Four-Track Mind (Volume 3) (2008 Alan Davey – AD4TM-3 – CDR)
- Four-Track Mind (Volume 4) (2008 Alan Davey – AD4TM-4 – CDR)
- Four-Track Mind (2010 Earthquake Records – EQRCD0004 – 4xCDr, Ltd, Comp)
- Hawklords, Friends and Relations : 30th Anniversary Volume (also featuring Bedouin, Alan Davey)

=== Miscellaneous ===
- Sci-fi-delic Ep (1998 ELF (3) – ELF001 – CDr)
- Dumpy's Rusty Nuts: Firkin Well Live (Vinyl Double LP) Guesting on bass duties and backing vocals Razor Records Raz D39
- Resident Reptile · Pink Fairies (2018 Purple Pyramid Records)
- Ace of Spades: Born To Booze, Live To Sin - A Tribute To Motörhead (2023 Cleopatra Records – CD/LP/Digital)
