= Harvey Bainbridge =

British musician

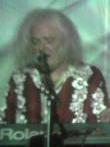
Bainbridge on stage with the Hawkwind spin-off Hawklords, live in Germany 2012

Harvey Frederick Bainbridge (born 24 September 1949, Dorset) is an English musician. He is best known as the bass player and keyboard player in Hawkwind.

== Career ==
Bainbridge's first musical group was when he was at school. A group of friends formed a band called Fredsfuzz with Martin Bland on vocals, brother Lawrence on drums, Gary Tinson on lead, Bainbridge, having just purchased a bass guitar and amplifier, and 'Fred' Davis on organ. The group was a rhythm and blues band, playing Chuck Berry covers etc.

Later, Bainbridge was a member of a group in Devon called Ark. Another member was Martin Griffin who also later played in the Hawklords and Hawkwind. He initially joined Hawkwind members Dave Brock and Robert Calvert in 1977 in a band called Sonic Assassins in which he played bass guitar. Sonic Assassins was formed by Brock to exist alongside Hawkwind, but to focus on playing local concerts around South West England.

When Hawkwind split up after the 1978 tour of the United States, Bainbridge was asked to play for Brock and Calvert's new band Hawklords. By 1979, the Hawklords had largely disintegrated and although the legal ownership of the name "Hawkwind" was still in doubt, Brock and Bainbridge re-created Hawkwind.

Bainbridge continued to play bass with Hawkwind until late 1984. He then became the band's primary keyboard player, as Brock recruited the 20-year-old Alan Davey into the band to play bass. Bainbridge continued in this role until 1991. Since leaving Hawkwind, he has worked mainly as a solo performer but has also performed with Lancashire space rockers Earthling Society at a number of their shows. Bainbridge with Spaceseed released an album on Zeta Reticuli Records called The Empire of Night in 2006.

Bainbridge was involved in the formation of a new Hawklords in 2008 and continued with them until 2020.
