= Dave Brock =

English musician (born 1941)

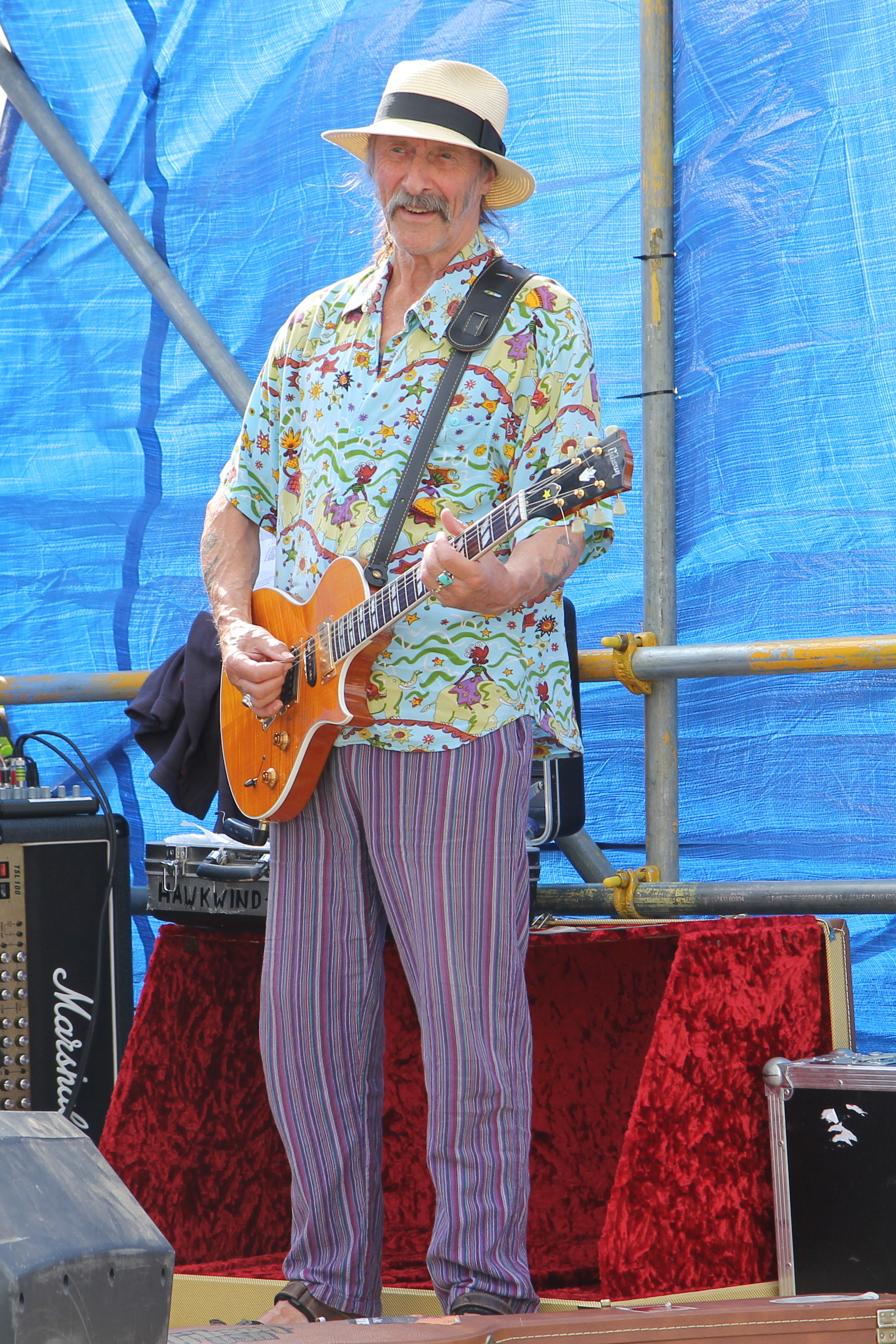
- Brock in 2015

Background information
- Born: David Anthony Brock; 20 August 1941 (age 84)
- Origin: Isleworth, Middlesex, England
- Genres: Space rock, progressive rock, hard rock
- Occupations: Musician, songwriter
- Instruments: Vocals; guitar; keyboards
- Years active: 1960–present
- Labels: Flicknife, EBS, Voiceprint

David Anthony Brock (born 20 August 1941) is an English musician and multi-instrumentalist, best known as the founder, the sole constant member and the musical focus of the space rock group Hawkwind. Brock was honoured with a lifetime achievement award at the annual Progressive Music Awards in 2013.

== Early years ==
Brock was born in Isleworth, Middlesex. His childhood was spent in Feltham, Middlesex; he attended the Longford Secondary Modern School (now called Rivers Academy). His father's brother introduced him to music, giving him a banjo at the age of twelve, and a school art teacher encouraged him in his learning. Brock's influences at this time included Fats Domino and Humphrey Lyttelton.

After leaving school in 1959, he undertook several jobs including work as a capstan setter, before moving to an animation company, Larkin Studios. He pursued his interests in music at night, although with no initial intentions of it becoming a career, attending clubs such as Eel Pie Island, playing New Orleans trad jazz and blues, and busking with friends such as Eric Clapton, Keith Relf, Jeff Watson and Mick Slattery.

He formed a trio with pianist Mike King and harmonica player Luke Francis (born 1943, Newcastle-upon-Tyne) called the Dharma Blues Band; this group recorded versions of Sonny Boy Williamson II's "Dealing with the Devil" and Pete Johnson's "Roll 'Em Pete" for Blues Anytime Vol. 2 (Immediate, IMCP015) in 1966, and backed travelling American blues singers such as Memphis Slim and Champion Jack Dupree. The band would continue without Brock, recording an album in 1967.

Quitting his daytime job, he travelled around Europe earning money by busking, sometimes with harmonica player Pete Judd. With guitarist John Illingworth, Brock and Judd formed The Famous Cure, touring in the Netherlands, and again after Slattery had replaced Judd in 1967, also having a hit single with "Sweet Mary"/"Mean Mistreater". (Note: Although "Sweet Mary" was reported to have been a hit single in Holland, the recording was never issued. It was recorded along with "You Mistreat Me", "Dealing with the Devil" and Elmore James's "Dust my Broom", accompanied by piano player Rob Hoeke and the drummer from Mack (a group from the Hague), at Soundpush studio, for Evert Wilbrink's Negram Delta label. The tapes are believed to have been re-used or destroyed, so only acetate recordings of these performances could possibly have survived.) With the psychedelic scene burgeoning in London and the band using LSD, their music changed with them starting to use electric instruments and effects units.

In 1968 he resorted to busking for a living and, on the back of the success of Don Partridge's hits "Rosie" and "Blue Eyes", performed in January 1969 at the Buskers' Concert at the Royal Albert Hall, contributing "Bring It On Home" to The Buskers album (Columbia, SX6356). In April and May, Brock joined the Buskers tour of the UK, which travelled around the country to each venue in a red London Transport double-decker bus.

== Hawkwind ==
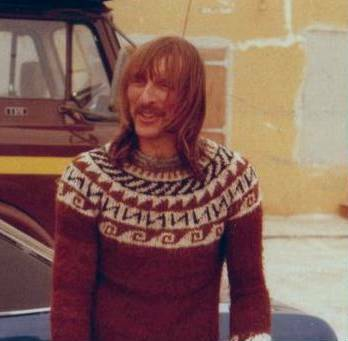
Brock in Cornwall, 1982

In 1969, Slattery and Brock continued jamming together and with whoever else was around. The genesis of Hawkwind was in their meeting with bass player John A. Harrison, who was also taking an interest in experimental music after stints in more conventional bands such as the Joe Loss Band. A music paper advert brought in teenage drummer Terry Ollis, while friends Nik Turner and Dik Mik were invited to join the band on saxophone and electronics respectively after the pair had originally offered their services as roadcrew.

From the outset, Brock's intentions for the band was to marry simple three-chord rock music with experimental electronic music. He cites his influences for the band at the time as the Moody Blues, Steve Miller Band and the krautrock scene of Kraftwerk, Neu! and particularly Can.

Doctor Technical was an "alter ego" created by Brock for his production credit on "Silver Machine". He has regularly used the alias since at various times, notably for the album Church of Hawkwind. He has also used the aliases Dr Hasbeen and Sylvia Macmanus (his second wife's name).

Brock has remained Hawkwind's musical focus and primary songwriter throughout their existence. He has little interest in lyrics and much of the time has benefited from collaborating with lyricists such as Robert Calvert and Michael Moorcock. Although being the only ever-present member of the band, there have been times, particularly in the early days when the line-up was fluid, when he would miss gigs such as the 1971 Glastonbury Festival. On stage, his preference is to remain at the back and let others take centre stage and be the focus of attention, to the point where he will often employ dancers, mime artists and fire-eaters to fill that space. At other times (particularly in their early days), the entire band was totally obscured by their light show.

The band are based in Devon, where they rehearse and record in a converted barn named Earth Studios.

== Equipment ==
Brock has used a variety of guitars over the years. In the 1980s and 1990s, Brock primarily used Westone guitars: from 1985 a Westone Spectrum LX (custom-painted by Alan Arthurs, with a portion of the Space Ritual album cover), and a Westone Paduak–1 from 1982 until 2008 (custom-painted by Guy Thomas, with the Warrior on the Edge of Time album cover). Brock now uses a 2007 Gibson Antique Artist or a 1997 Gibson Nighthawk Standard. Noticeably, Brock has also used the same amplifier for many years: a 1978 Roland JC120 with two Hiwatt 4x12 cabs painted by Barney Bubbles. For effects, Brock uses a Line 6 Pod V2, which produces the distinctive sounds associated with him.

== Discography ==
=== Solo records ===
- 1982 – "Zones" / "Processed", one-sided 7-inch (Hawkfan Records)
- 1983 – "Social Alliance" / "Raping Robots in the Street", 7-inch (Flicknife Records)
- 1984 – Earthed to the Ground (Flicknife Records)
- 1987 – The Agents of Chaos (Flicknife Records)
- 1995 – Strange Trips & Pipe Dreams (Emergency Broadcast System Records)
- 2000 – Spacebrock (Hawk Records)
- 2001 – Memos and Demos (Voiceprint Records)
- 2007 – The Brock/Calvert Project – Robert Calvert and Dave Brock (Voiceprint Records)
- 2012 – Looking for Love in the Lost Land of Dreams (Esoteric Antenna)
- 2015 – Brockworld (Hawkward / Brockmusic)

=== Guest appearances ===
- 1974 – Robert Calvert – Captain Lockheed and the Starfighters – lead guitar on "Widowmaker"
- 1975 – Michael Moorcock & Deep Fix – New Worlds Fair
- 2002 – Star One – Space Metal – vocals on "Hawkwind Medley"
