= Steve Clarke (drummer) =

British drummer (born 1959)

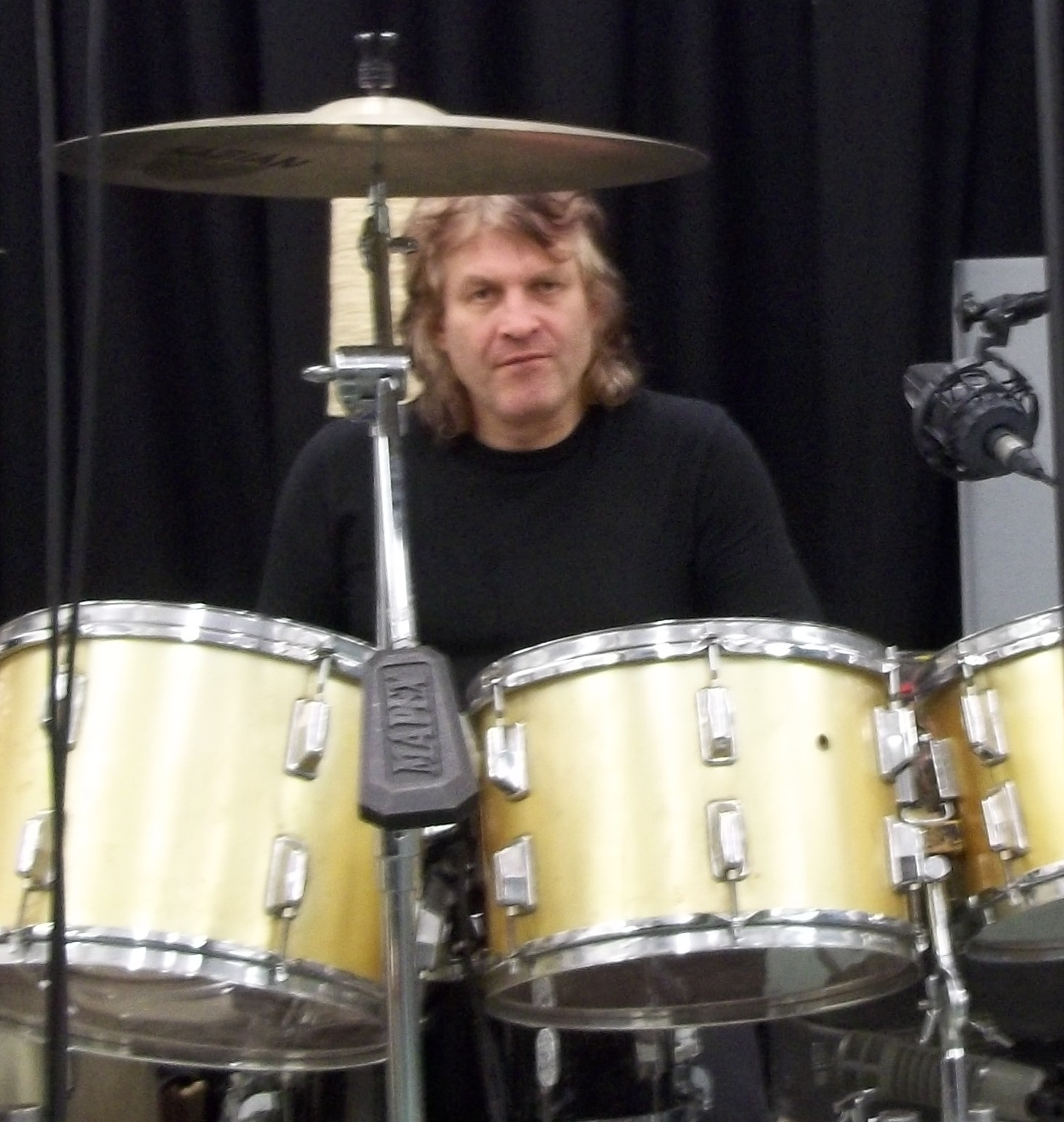
- Clarke in 2011

Background information
- Born: Steven Gerald Clarke; 20 November 1959 (age 66); London, England
- Genres: Jazz-rock, heavy metal, post-bop
- Occupation: Musician
- Instrument: Drums
- Years active: 1977–present

Steve Clarke (born 20 November 1959) is a British drummer. He is a former member of the rock bands Quasar and Fastway.

== Life and career ==
Steve Clarke was born in Twickenham on 20 November 1959 to parents Eric and Sally Clarke. Clarke started playing drums aged four under tuition from his uncle, Jeff Whetstone and father Eric Clarke. Subsequently, he joined the Boys' Brigade where he developed his rudimentary and marching techniques. Aged 21, he worked as a tech for drummer Billy Cobham.

He organised and played in an improvised gig at the Hamborough Tavern in Southall, with guitarists Steve Topping, Richard Chapman and bass guitarist Nick Stephens. The cassette recording of the jam was released on CD retrospectively (18 years later) in 1999 under the name Volume 33 Riot at The Hanborough Tavern.

From 1979 to 1980 Clarke had a brief stint in the progressive rock band Quasar alongside guitarist John Clark, who left to join Bruford.

Also in the 1980s, Clarke worked closely with Jeff Pain a.k.a. 'Dicken' from UK band Mr Big, recording a number of songs which would not see the light of day for a few years to come. He also recorded drums on the album Rainbow Bridge.

=== Network ===
In 1986, Clarke formed the group 'Network' with guitarist Tim Crowther, keyboard player Pete Jacobsen, bassists Paul Rogers and Laurence Cottle, and trumpet player Ted Emmett. Other musicians associated with the project included Steve Topping, David Cross, and Hugh Hopper. The band released four albums and a compilation, 'View From The Bar'.

In the 'Billboard Guide To Progressive Music' Bradley Smith described 'Corroded Path' (1989) as a melodic jazz-rock fusion album in the style of Brand X and Bruford, praising it's arrangements and solo performances.

Clarke later wrote and produced the album 'LNC', recorded in 1996 with guitarist Keith More. Steve Topping and Jan Hammer also appeared on the recording. This took Clarke's music to a larger worldwide audience including playing concerts in the USA. As a result of playing in New York, the 1998 collaboration with guitarist Larry Coryell followed as a step forward to showcase Clarke's compositions. The tracks featured Pete Jacobsen on keyboards and Wolfgang Schmid on guitar, plus Jack Bruce on bass and vocals on a cover of the Hendrix classic Manic Depression. Entitled Highly Committed Media Players it would become Clarke's most well known album to date. He followed this by recording the album, Solo Drums in May 2000. One of the pieces featured a tribute to an early mentor and friend of his father and uncle, Phil Seaman. Clarke was then inducted as a fellow of the British Library for his services to progressive music.

During this period, in 1993 Clarke hooked up with his good friend Zak Starkey and formed a band 'Spin Out' that featured Zak on guitar, Gary Roberts on bass, Gary Nuttall on guitar and Steve Barnard a.k.a. 'Smiley' on occasional drums/guitar.

For several years, Clarke ran a multi-track audio and video recording complex and 2013 saw him write, play on and produce a new album featuring famous trumpeter Randy Brecker.

=== Fastway ===
In 1987, Clarke joined the heavy rock/Metal band Fastway led by his paternal cousin Fast Eddie Clarke formerly of Motörhead. Clarke played on the album On Target and fulfilled live duties. In 1989, Clarke joined Tank, led by Algy Ward whilst also working with bassist Gerry McAvoy. Clarke and Ward joined Judge Trev Thoms for the Necropolis- End Of The Line album featuring Bill Liesegang, ex Motörhead guitarist Würzel Burston and Clarke was re-united with Fast Eddie Clarke and John Clarke. Clarke also appeared on two all star albums for Japanese Polydor Records that would see him recording with Don Airey and Scott Gorham.

=== Tank and Atomgod ===
Clarke also joined UK heavy rock band Atomgods (who became Atomgod) on their release History Re-Written through GWR Records in 1991, which also featured film/TV producer Lee Phillips on keyboards, Trev Thoms, and Bill Leisegang. Atomgod led Clarke to become the house drummer at GWR Records, playing with Huw Lloyd Langton and notably Tank.

=== Leader of Down ===
He is currently active as the drummer of Leader Of Down, the last band of Würzel, and bassist Tim Atkinson. Their debut album Cascade Into Chaos was released in late 2016 and featured some of the last recordings by the late Lemmy, along with Phil Campbell and Eddie Clarke who died on 10 January 2018, after a battle with pneumonia.

== Discography ==
- Applying Rudiments to Improvisation 2015
- Solo Drums 2002
- Highly Committed Media Players 2002
- Last Throw of the Dice 2001
- LNC 2000
- Precisely The Oppposte 1999
- End of the Line 1997
- Refusal to Comply 1995
- Corroded Path 1994
- Bible Says 1992
- History Re-Written 1991
- On Target 1988
- Riot 1982
