= Fastway =

Fastway may refer to:

- Fastway (bus rapid transit), a guided bus transport service in Crawley, UK
- Fastway Couriers, a courier franchise business operating in Ireland and South Africa
- Fastway (band), a British rock band
  - Fastway (album), the band's self-titled first album, 1983
