= Trick or Treat (Fastway album) =

Studio album /soundtrack by Fastway
- Released: October 31, 1986
- Studio: Windmill Lane Studios, Dublin
- Genre: Hard rock, heavy metal, glam metal
- Length: 33:43
- Label: Columbia
- Producer: Eddie Clarke, Wiil Reid Dick, Eddie Kramer (tracks 8 & 9), Stephen E. Smith

Fastway chronology
Waiting for the Roar (1985)	Trick or Treat (1986)	On Target (1988)

Singles from Trick or Treat
- 1. "After Midnight" Released: 1986

Professional ratings
Review scores
Source	Rating
AllMusic	1.5/5 stars
Collector's Guide to Heavy Metal	4/10

Trick or Treat is the fourth album by the heavy metal band Fastway and the soundtrack to the heavy metal horror film Trick or Treat. It was released as a studio album on Halloween 1986, a week after the release of the film. This is the final Fastway album to feature Dave King on vocals.

== Track listing ==
All songs written by Fastway

Side one
No.	Title	Length
1.	"Trick or Treat"	2:47
2.	"After Midnight"	3:39
3.	"Don't Stop the Fight"	4:21
4.	"Stand Up"	4:04
5.	"Tear Down the Walls"	2:07

Side two
No.	Title	Length
6.	"Get Tough"	3:30
7.	"Hold on to the Night"	3:22
8.	"Heft" (Originally released on the album Fastway)	5:19
9.	"If You Could See" (Originally released on the album All Fired Up)	4:34

== Charts ==
Year	Chart	Position
1986–87	US Billboard 200	156
1988	Australian Albums (ARIA)	35

== Personnel ==
Fastway

- 'Fast' Eddie Clarke - lead guitar/rhythm guitar, producer
- Dave King - lead vocals
- Shane Carroll - second guitar
- Alan Connor - drums
- Paul Reid - bass guitar
- Jerry Shirley - drums on tracks 8 and 9
- Mick Feat - bass on track 8
- Charlie McCracken - bass on track 9

Additional musicians

- Pete Williams - Fairlight programming

Production

- Will Reid Dick - producer, engineer
- Eddie Kramer - producer, engineer on tracks 8 and 9
- Stephen E. Smith - executive producer
- Geoff Pescke - mastering
