= Steve Took's Horns =

- Origin: London, England
- Genre: Rock
- Years active: 1977–1978, 2002
- Label: Cherry Red Records
- Past members: Steve Peregrin Took; Trev Thoms; Ermanno Ghisio Erba; Jamie Roberts; Steve Scarsbrook; John (a German biker); Ron Tree

Steve Took's Horns was an English rock band with blues rock and punk influences formed in 1977 by former Tyrannosaurus Rex percussionist (and Pink Fairies founder) turned solo artist Steve Peregrin Took together with Trev Thoms, later of Nik Turner's Inner City Unit (although Took had been using the bandname since 1976). The band was the first in which Thoms worked with his future Inner City Unit bandmate Ermanno Ghisio Erba aka Dino Ferari, in what would be a long string of collaborations until Thoms' death in 2010. A 2004 posthumous album of the band was reviewed in Classic Rock magazine, a 1978 live performance was reviewed in Melody Maker, the band's 1977 recording session was described at length in a Forced Exposure interview with eyewitness Larry Wallis and the band was euologised in a Record Collector article about Took written by Luke Haines.

== History ==
=== Formation ===
Since leaving Tyrannosaurus Rex in 1969, Took had formed his own band Shagrat with guitarist Larry Wallis. The group had recorded electric and acoustic demos and played at the Phun City festival before dwindling down into a solo acoustic act by Took. In this capacity Took had become a staple of the underground benefit concerts circuit, been the subject of various articles and interviews for the UK music press and performed a set on the BBC Radio London show Breakthrough (hosted by Steve Bradshaw). A 1972 management deal with Tony Secunda and 'seed money' grant from Warner Brothers failed to result in any record releases, although home demos recorded in the basement flat of Secunda's office were released in 1995 by Cleopatra Records.

By 1976, Took had returned to London from a lengthy sojourn in the Kent towns of Canterbury and Margate and was loosely rehearsing as Steve Took's Horns with a succession of musicians. The name came from a horned pendant which Took frequently wore. The Horns became a more serious band in mid/late 1977 when Took recruited Thoms and Ghisio-Erba to the band and signed a management contract with Tony Landau, a friend of Turner's since adolescence and stepfather to Took's young son Luke.

=== Career ===
Through extensive rehearsals (later described by Thoms as "the most outrageous misuse of drugs I've ever done while playing music") the band compiled a set of songs heavily influenced by The Rolling Stones, The Faces and The Sex Pistols. On 29 November at Pathway Studios in London, the band recorded three of these songs, "It's Over", "Average Man" and "Woman I Need." By chance, Took's old collaborator Wallis, a frequent producer at the studio, was on hand for the session. However, disheartened by Took's consumption of considerable alcohol in order to prepare himself to sing, Wallis left before Took completed his vocal. Years later, he expressed surprise and pleasure to learn that in fact Took performed a good vocal for the tracks.

Landau approached several record companies with the tape, but was met with wariness due to Took's reputation for drug consumption and unreliability. Eventually a concert was booked as a showcase for the band at Nik Turner's Bohemian Love-In at The Roundhouse on 18 June 1978. The resulting gig, although technically sound, was deemed a disappointment by the band and Took consequently broke up the group. Reviewing the event for Melody Maker, writer Chris Brazier described the band as "flagrantly retrogressive hard rock from the sewer of '71." Mike Scott, future singer for The Waterboys, who was in attendance, many years later recalled feeling surprise that the group "played boogie-ish rock" rather than a more folky mystical act, given Took's past in Tyrannosaurus Rex. He also recalled that Took seemed subdued and that Thoms largely carried the show.

=== Aftermath ===
Despite the breakup, the Horns had made a considerable impression on Took's circle of acquaintances. Consequently, Turner first recruited Ferari to his Sphynx project, before adding Thoms to form his new band Inner City Unit (known for short as ICU) in 1979. Took was quick to notice that Turner had effectively resurrected his old band - ICU keyboardist Steve Pond recalls Took in 1979 trying to blag his way into the group.

This approach proved partly successful as Took frequently guested with Inner City Unit in 1979-1980 with Took, Thoms and Ghisio-Erba performing together in what were effectively Horns reunions. Two bootleg recordings exist of Took performing a cover of "Slow Down", (previously rehearsed by the Horns) with Inner City Unit - by now featuring Mick Stupp on drums - on 6 May 1980 at Meanwhile Gardens in Westbourne Park and 16 June 1980 at Camden's Music Machine.

In 1988, Thoms' new band Atomgods's debut album WOW! included a track Mountain Range written by Thoms in memory of his time with the Horns. Thoms would later re-record the song in 1997 for Inner City Unit's new album Now You Know The Score.

In 2004, 24 years after Took's death, Cherry Red released the Pathway Studios session as the core of an album, Blow It - The All New Adventures Of Steve Took's Horns. In addition to the three 1977 tracks plus an out-take version of "Average Man" with Took comically improvising after forgetting his lyrics, the CD also featured remixes of the tracks and the 1997 version of Thoms' aforementioned "Mountain Range" tribute song, plus new recordings of two other Took songs, "Ooh My Heart" and "Too Bad" which the Horns had been rehearsing in 1977-1978. These new recordings featured Thoms and Ghisio-Erba together with former Hawkwind frontman Ron Tree on lead vocals and bass. Classic Rock magazine reviewer Hugh Fielder commented on the three original 1977 Horns tracks, "They sound a bit like The Faces if Rod Stewart had been replaced by Johnny Thunders. Which has possibilities."

On the strength of their collaboration on the Steve Took's Horns CD, Thoms and Tree formed a new band, briefly also featuring Ghisio-Erba. The band was initially known as Inner City Horns - (acronym ICH) then later Inner City Hawks (also ICH) before settling on the name MOAB (Mother Of All Bands). An alternative mix of the Horns song "Ooh My Heart", as recorded for the Horns CD, was included as a secret bonus track on the 2005 Amphetibeast Records edition of MOAB's album Insect Brain.

Writing about Took's solo/frontman career for Record Collector, former The Auteurs frontman Luke Haines summarised the Horns as "a tough pub rock bovver boy group that managed to record a few great songs and typically, again managed to not get them released" until "[the] Horns material [became] available on the Cherry Red comp Blow It!!! – The All New Adventures Of ..."

== Line ups ==
=== Studio session at Pathway Studios 29 November 1977 ===
- Steve Peregrin Took: Vocals, electric rhythm guitar, acoustic guitar
- Trev Thoms: electric lead guitar, backing vocals
- Ermanno Ghisio-Erba: drums
- Steve Scarsbrook: bass
- Jamie Roberts: keyboards

=== Live performance at Nik Turner's Bohemian Love-In, The Roundhouse 18 June 1978 ===
- Steve Peregrin Took: Vocals, electric rhythm guitar
- Trev Thoms: electric lead guitar, backing vocals
- Ermanno Ghisio-Erba: drums
- John (a German biker): bass

=== New recordings made late 2002 for CD release ===
- Ron Tree: lead vocals, bass
- Trev Thoms: electric lead guitar, backing and some lead vocals
- Ermanno Ghisio-Erba: drums

== Discography ==
=== Album ===
- 2004 - Steve Took's Horns: Blow It!!! The All New Adventures Of Steve Took's Horns CD (Cherry Red Records, CDM RED 255)

=== Guest appearance ===
- 2005 - MOAB: Insect Brain - contains alternative mix of Ooh My Heart from Blow It!!! - 25 copy CD/DVD promotional pack edition (Amphetibeast)
