= It Ain't Over till It's Over =

Studio album by Fast Eddie Clarke
- Released: 21 March 1994
- Recorded: 1994
- Genre: Hard rock, heavy metal
- Length: 50:02
- Label: Griffin Music
- Producer: Will Reid Dick

Professional ratings
Review scores
| Source | Rating |
|---|---|
| AllMusic | 4/5 stars |
| Rock Hard | 7.0/10 stars |

It Ain't Over till It's Over is the only solo album by Fast Eddie Clarke, former Motörhead and Fastway guitarist. Lemmy guests on the song "Laugh at the Devil".

== Track listing ==
1. "Snakebite"
2. "Lying Ain't Right"
3. "Back on the Road"
4. "Naturally"
5. "All Over Bar the Shouting"
6. "Make My Day"
7. "Laugh at the Devil"
8. "No Satisfaction"
9. "Lessons"
10. "Hot Straight and Normal"
11. "In the City"
12. "It Ain't Over till It's Over"

The line is based on a Yogiism, or quotation from Yogi Berra: "It ain't over till it's over".

== Personnel ==
- Eddie Clarke – guitar, vocals
- Mel Gabbitas – bass
- Pete Riley – drums
- John Sloman – backing vocals

with:

- Lemmy – vocals on "Laugh at the Devil"
