= Atomgods =

UK heavy rock band

- Origin: United Kingdom
- Genres: Heavy rock, heavy metal

Atomgods were a UK heavy rock band from late 1980s. The band were formed by former Inner City Unit guitarist Judge Trev Thoms, the first recording lineup consisting of Hiro Sasaki and Kofi Baker (Ginger's son). They were signed to GWR Records producing the 1988 album WOW! and the 1991 album History Re-Written.

For the second album, which saw the band shorten their name to Atomgod and took on a thrash metal direction. Thoms was joined by bassist Algy Ward (The Damned and Tank), guitarist Bill Liesegang (Nina Hagen Band), and drummer Steve Clarke of Fastway

Judge Trev Thoms went on to form Mother of All Bands (MOAB) with Hawkwind's ex bassist/frontman, Ron Tree and produced the album "Insect Brain" on Real Festival Music. In 2007 Judge Trev returned to playing with former Hawkwind sax player Nik Turner in the reformed Inner City Unit but died on 8 December 2010 from pancreatic cancer.

Atomgod drummer Steve Clarke went on to form the band Necropolis, producing the 1993 End of the Line album released on Neat Records in 1997.

There are unconfirmed reports that Motörhead guitarists Würzel and Fast Eddie Clarke contributed to some recordings, but Fast Eddie certainly did play on the Necropolis album.

== Atomgods – WOW! ==
=== Track list ===
1. "Camden Town"
2. "Dolphins" (Thoms)
3. "Bashin' Up the Rich" (Thoms)
4. "Atlantic Waves" (Thoms)
5. "Dog Rot" (Thoms)
6. "Oh Yea"
7. "Slow Down Motörhead"
8. "Mountain Range"
9. "Convoy"
10. "Oh No"

=== Personnel ===
- Trev Thoms – Vocals, Guitar
- Hiro Sasaki – Bass
- Kofi Baker – Drums

=== Release history ===
- GWR Records – GWLP30, 1988

== Atomgod – History Re-Written ==
=== Track list ===
1. "Atom God"
2. "Radio Death"
3. "Virgin Blood"
4. "History Re-Written Part 1"
5. "Welcome to the Kingdom of Doom"
6. "History Re-Written Part 2"
7. "Cesspit (Cauldron of Death)"
8. "(Death Will Come From) China" (Thoms/Clark/Ward)

=== Personnel ===
- Trev Thoms – Vocals, Guitar
- Bill Liesegang – Guitar
- Algy Ward – Bass
- Steve Clarke – Drums

=== Release history ===
- GWR Records – GWLP??, 1991
- Progressive International PRO 026 1992

== Necropolis – End of the Line ==
=== Track list ===
1. Victim
2. Samaritan
3. A Taste For Killing
4. Shadowman
5. 145 Speed Overload
6. The Bitterness I Taste

=== Personnel ===
- John Knight – Vocals (Blueprint for Bedlam album)
- Sven Olaffsen – Vocals
- Trev Thoms – Guitar
- Bill Liesegang – Guitar
- Keith More – Guitar
- 'Fast' Eddie Clarke – Guitar
- Algy Ward – Bass
- Lee Phillips – Keyboards/vocals
- Steve Clarke – Drums

=== Release history ===
- Neat Metal – NM021, 1997
