= The Manticore Tapes =

Compilation album by Motörhead
- Released: June 27, 2025
- Recorded: August 1976
- Studio: Manticore Studios, Fulham; Maple Studios, California; Bolskine House, Los Angeles
- Genre: Rock
- Length: 43:12
- Label: Sanctuary

Motörhead chronology
Bad Magic (2015)	The Manticore Tapes (2025)

Singles from The Manticore Tapes
- 1. "Motörhead" Released: 8 May 2025; 2. "Leavin' Here" Released: 12 June 2025

The Manticore Tapes is a compilation album by English rock band Motörhead. It was released on 27 June 2025 via Sanctuary in vinyl, double vinyl, CD and digital formats.

== Background ==
Released ten years after the previous project, Bad Magic, in 2015 and dubbed a "lost" album, The Manticore Tapes consists of eleven tracks from the band's "classic" lineup debut recording studio session in August 1976, featuring Lemmy, "Fast" Eddie Clarke, and Phil Taylor.

The album title was inspired by the name of a Fulham studio owned by Emerson, Lake & Palmer, in which the band rehearsed and recorded in 1976. The original recording was conducted by Ron Fawcus and restored by Cameron Webb. The album was mastered by Andrew Alekel. The double vinyl version of the album consists of the eleven studio tracks as LP#1, an eleven-track live album entitled Blitzkrieg on Birmingham 77′ as LP#2 (recorded in Birmingham on 3 June 1977 at the Town Hall) and a bonus 7″ single comprising 2 tracks (also recorded in Birmingham but at other date & venue: on 12 October 1977 at Barbarella's).

"Motörhead" was released as the first single of the album on 8 May 2025. It was followed by the second single, "Leavin' Here", on 12 June 2025, alongside a music video.

== Reception ==
Professional ratings
Review scores
Source	Rating
Blabbermouth	7/10 stars
Classic Rock	4/5 stars
Metal Hammer	7/10 stars
Mojo	4/5 stars

Classic Rock rated the album four stars out of five and noted, "Outtakes or no outtakes, this reissue manages to pull off the considerable trick of feeling like a complete whole – the first iteration of the classic line-up after Motörhead's formation in 1975."

Louder Than War remarked about the album, "As some of Lemmy's inter-song banter has been retained, this is a studio quality album with a live feel, 'live in the studio' if you like." Blabbermouth assigned the album a rating of seven out of ten, stating that "The Manticore Tapes will never rival Ace of Spades for excitement or quality, but the sound of an explosive, undeniable rock 'n' roll band revving their engines is unmistakable."

James McNair of Mojo, rating the album four stars out of five, noted, "The Manticore Tapes constitute an alternative history showing just how potent early Motorhead really were." Metal Hammer's Alastair Riddell opined, "Here, the garage and proto-metal sound owes more to MC5 and the Pink Fairies than to their later recordings. Essential? Maybe not. But an absolute joy for fans," rating it seven out of ten.

== Track listing ==
No.	Title	Length
1.	"Intro (Instrumental)"	3:45
2.	"Leavin' Here"	3:23
3.	"Vibrator"	3:26
4.	"Help Keep Us on the Road"	4:58
5.	"The Watcher"	4:37
6.	"Motörhead"	3:09
7.	"Witch Doctor (Instrumental)"	2:37
8.	"Iron Horse / Born to Lose (Instrumental)"	5:55
9.	"Leavin' Here (Alternate Take)"	3:26
10.	"Vibrator (Alternate Take)"	3:30
11.	"The Watcher (Alternate Take)"	4:26
Total length:		43:12

== Personnel ==
Credits adapted from Consequence and Tidal.

=== Motörhead ===
- Lemmy Kilmister – bass, lead vocals
- Eddie Clarke – guitar, backing vocals
- Phil Taylor – drums

=== Additional contributors ===
- Ron Fawcus – recording
- Andrew Alekel – mastering
- Cameron Webb – restoration

== Charts ==
Chart performance for The Manticore Tapes
Chart (2025)	Peak position
Austrian Albums (Ö3 Austria)	17
Belgian Albums (Ultratop Flanders)	73
Belgian Albums (Ultratop Wallonia)	157
Finnish Albums (Suomen virallinen lista)	34
French Albums (SNEP)	158
French Rock & Metal Albums (SNEP)	9
German Albums (Offizielle Top 100)	9
Greek Albums (IFPI)	32
Scottish Albums (Official Charts)	6
Swedish Hard Rock Albums (Sverigetopplistan)	9
Swedish Physical Albums (Sverigetopplistan)	3
Swiss Albums (Schweizer Hitparade)	19
UK Albums (Official Charts)	62
UK Independent Albums (Official Charts)	2
UK Rock & Metal Albums (Official Charts)	1
