= Trellick Tower =

Brutalist tower block in Kensal Town, London

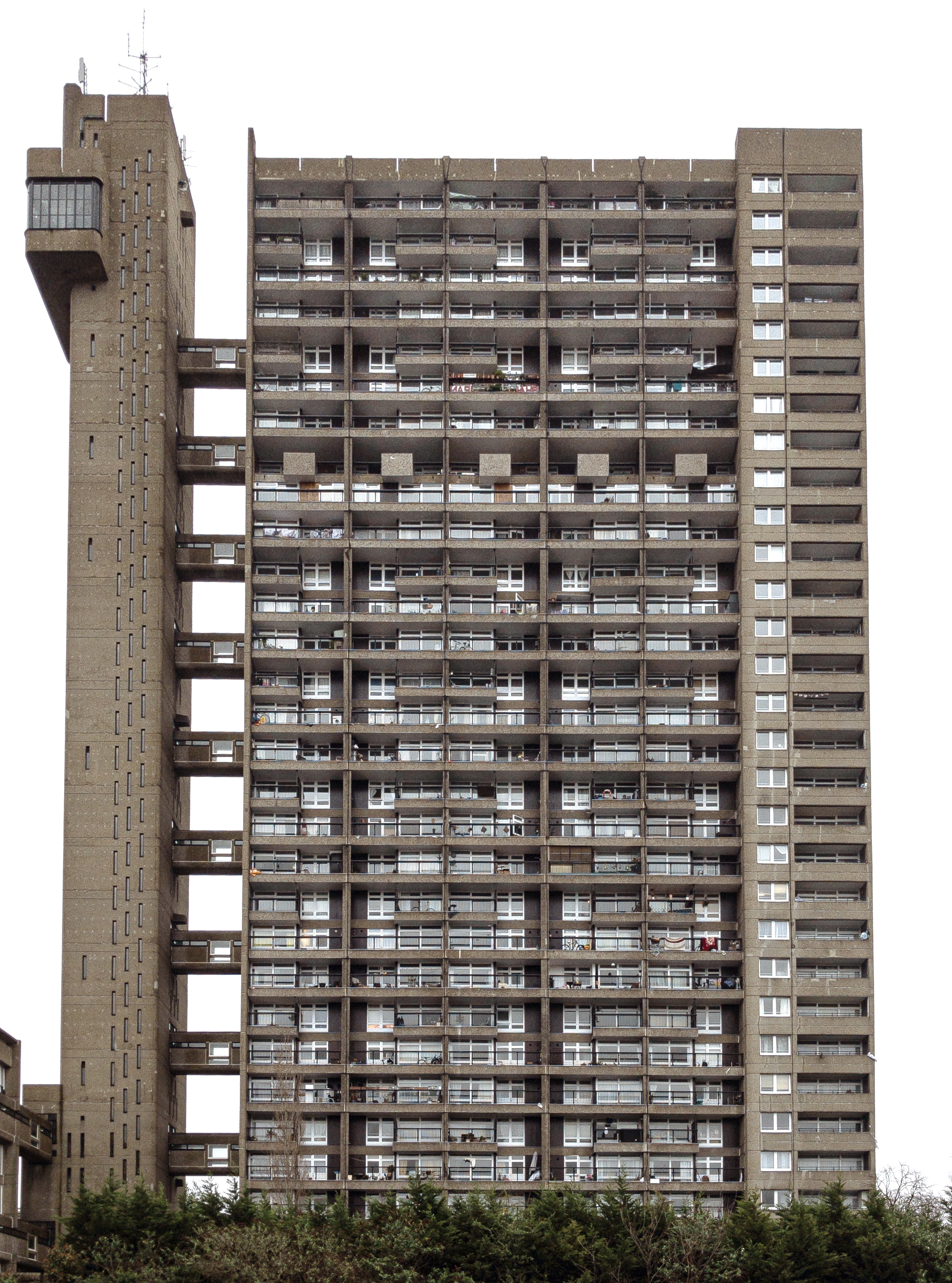
- Trellick Tower with its separate access tower with abutting plant house

- Location within Royal Borough of Kensington and Chelsea

General information
- Type: Residential flats
- Architectural style: Brutalist
- Location: Kensal Green, Royal Borough of Kensington and Chelsea, London
- Coordinates: 51°31′25″N 00°12′20″W
- Completed: 28 June 1972

Height
- Roof: 98 metres (322 ft)

Technical details
- Floor count: 31

Design and construction
- Architect: Ernő Goldfinger
- Designations

Listed Building – Grade II*
- Official name: Trellick Tower
- Designated: 22 December 1998
- Reference no.: 1246688

Trellick Tower is a Grade II* listed tower block on the Cheltenham Estate in Kensal Town, London. Opened in 1972, it was commissioned by the Greater London Council and designed in the Brutalist style by architect Ernő Goldfinger. The tower was planned to replace outdated social accommodation, and designed as an improvement on Goldfinger's earlier Balfron Tower in Poplar, East London. It was the last major project he worked on, and featured various space-saving designs, along with a separate access tower containing a plant room.

High-rise apartments and Brutalist architecture were falling out of favour by the time the tower was completed, and it became a magnet for crime, vandalism, drug abuse and prostitution. Conditions gradually improved in the 1980s after the establishment of a residents' association. Security measures were put in place and a concierge was employed, which led to lower crime levels. By the 1990s, the tower had become a desirable place to live, and although it still contains predominantly social housing, demand for private flats has remained high.

A local landmark, it has been Grade II* listed since 1998, and has retained its distinctive concrete facade as a result. A fire broke out in 2017, but the concrete structure meant damage was limited, unlike the nearby Grenfell Tower. Trellick Tower has featured in film and television several times.

== Location ==
Trellick Tower is on the Cheltenham Estate in Golborne Road, Kensal Town, Royal Borough of Kensington and Chelsea (RBKC). It is bounded to the north and east by Meanwhile Gardens and the Grand Union Canal, and to the south by the A40 Westway and the Great Western Main Line leading from London Paddington station.

The nearest stations are Kensal Green (Bakerloo line and London Overground), Ladbroke Grove and Westbourne Park (Circle and Hammersmith & City lines). The tower is served by London Buses route 23.

== Design ==
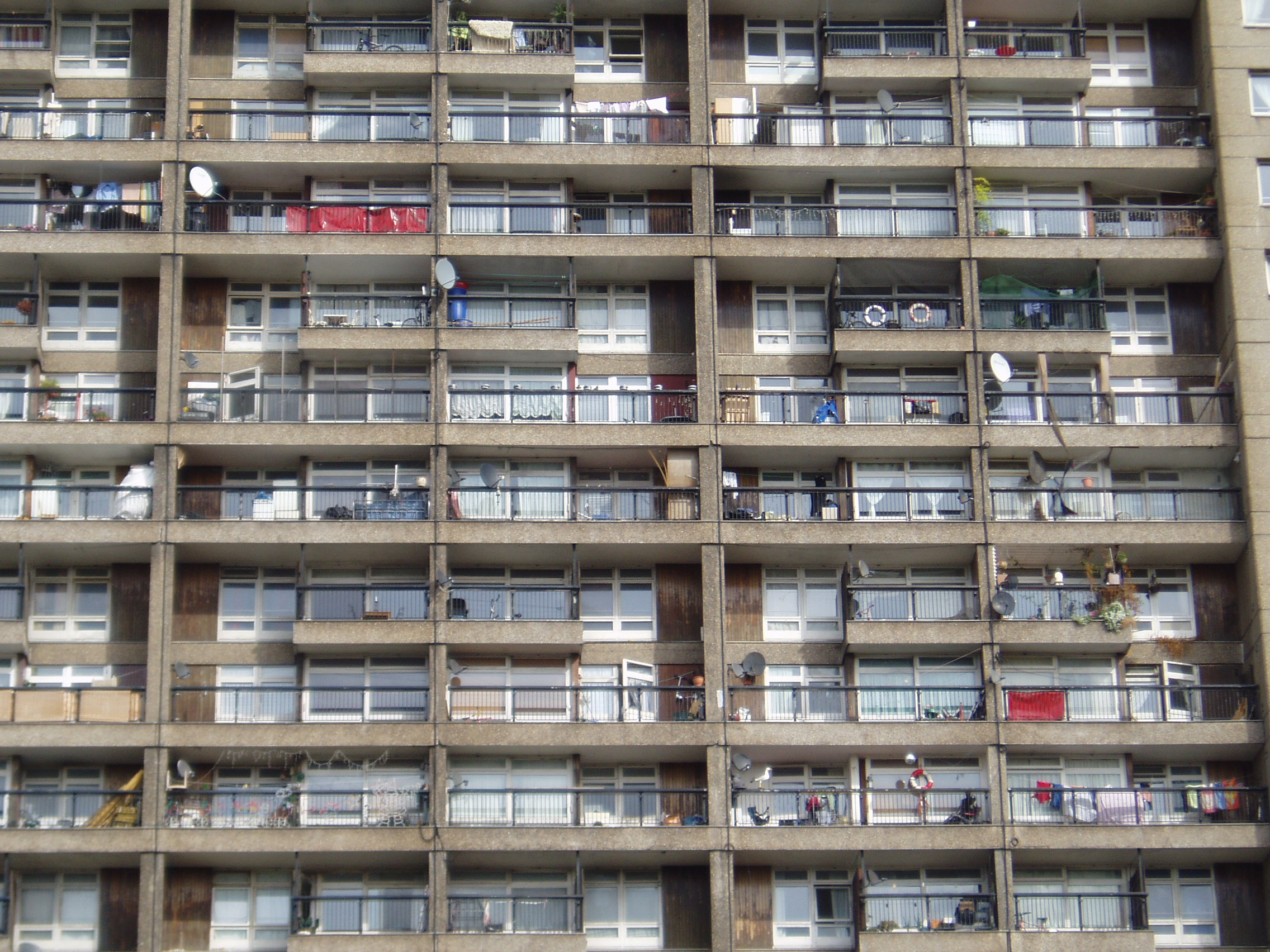
All apartments in Trellick Tower have a balcony and large windows to let in as much sunlight as possible.

The tower is 98 metres (322 ft) tall (120 metres (394 ft) including the communications mast) and is a Grade II* listed building. The design is based on Goldfinger's earlier and slightly smaller Balfron Tower in Poplar, East London. It has a long, thin profile, with a separate lift and service tower linked at every third storey to the access corridors in the main building, which overall has 31 floors. Flats above and below the corridor levels have internal stairs, while the 23rd and 24th floors are taken up by maisonettes split over the two floors. Overall, the building contains 217 dwellings and was originally owned by the GLC with the flats rented as council flats. All the apartments have balconies. The other building, which also contains shops and amenities, has seven floors.

The service tower has two additional floors higher than the main building, which includes a projecting plant room that holds the main heating system. It is fully linked by stairs in addition to the lifts, and also has a refuse chute mechanism. The majority of the plant and the hot water storage tank is located in the plant room, which reduces the need for pumps and reduces the amount of pipework needed. Shorter pipe runs also reduce heat loss. The oil-fired boilers originally used became obsolete due to the 1973 oil crisis, the year after the tower opened. The flats now have electric heaters and the plant room, although disused, still houses most of the now defunct mechanism.

Goldfinger designed the entire tower block freehand on butcher's paper. He planned various communal areas, and purposely put slight variations in the structure so that each apartment would look different. He included a number of space-saving designs, such as using sliding doors to access bathrooms, and light switches embedded in the door surrounds. All apartments have large windows facing the balconies, in order to let in as much natural light as possible. As well as residential accommodation, there are a variety of shops, an office, and a youth centre. Throughout, quality materials were used in construction, including better fixtures and finishing the balconies with cedarwood. It was intended to be a good example of social accommodation alongside modern design.

== History ==
=== Planning ===
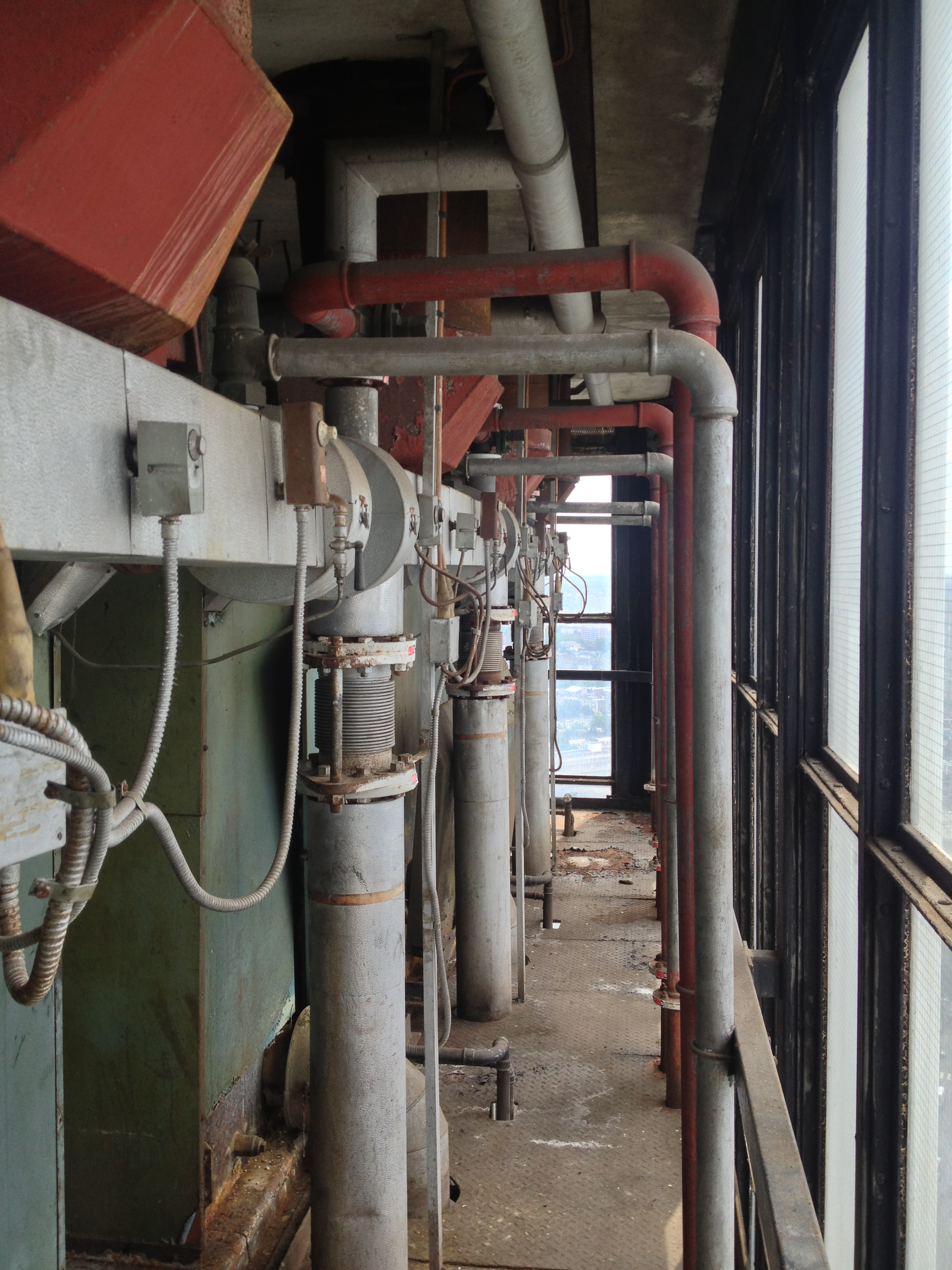
Inside the plant room in Trellick Tower

Construction of Trellick Tower began in 1968, in order to replace sub-standard local Victorian housing. The tower was one of several such buildings, and was initially welcomed as a way of resolving the crises of post-Second World War housing. Goldfinger said "the whole object of building high is to free the ground for children and grown-ups to enjoy Mother Earth and not to cover every inch with bricks and mortar".

Goldfinger had been encouraged to construct Trellick Tower by the London County Council (LCC) following the success of Balfron Tower, which had been commissioned in 1963 and opened four years later. He took his inspiration from Balfron, where he had moved into one of the apartments in order to experience what life would be like for the tenants, and invited residents round for regular cocktail parties to tell him their likes and dislikes. This feedback was incorporated into the design of Trellick Tower.

Many immigrants from the West Indies and the Caribbean settled in Trellick Tower, as for them it was one of the few affordable places to live in London. The tower opened on 28 June 1972; construction costs ran to £2.4 million. It was the last major project Goldfinger worked on; his reputation suffered as concrete tower blocks became unfashionable, and he died in 1987 before it could be restored.

=== Decline ===
By the time Trellick Tower opened, high-rise tower blocks were becoming unfashionable. The LCC had been replaced by the Greater London Council (GLC) by the time construction started, who put more stringent construction and financial constraints on the project. Shortly after its completion the building was transferred to the RBKC local council. Goldfinger had intended that tenants should be vetted for suitability and petitioned the GLC for the building to have proper security and a concierge, but the council declined his request. This meant that the building was open access and rough sleepers and drug criminals took up residence in its corridors. Drying rooms on the ground floor, designed by Goldfinger to stop tenants hanging laundry on the balconies, were vandalised before the tower block opened.

By the late 1970s Trellick Tower was a scene of crime and anti-social behaviour, and many tenants were very reluctant to move in. On one occasion vandals set off a fire extinguisher on the 12th floor, with water from the sprinkler system flooding the lifts and leaving the tower without electricity, heat or running water over the Christmas period. A pensioner was forced to use the stairs after all the lifts were out of order, and subsequently collapsed and died. On the 15th floor, a 27-year-old woman was dragged from one of the lifts and raped. The tower became nicknamed "The Tower of Terror" and residents attempted to be re-housed. The GLC spent more than £300,000 on an intercom system and wholesale electrical repairs, but reliability and management problems made them counterproductive.

In 1982 a man was killed after jumping off the top of Trellick Tower when his parachute failed to open. He was a member of a group of extreme sport enthusiasts who were interested in BASE jumping. The action was condemned by the British Parachute Association.

=== Revival ===
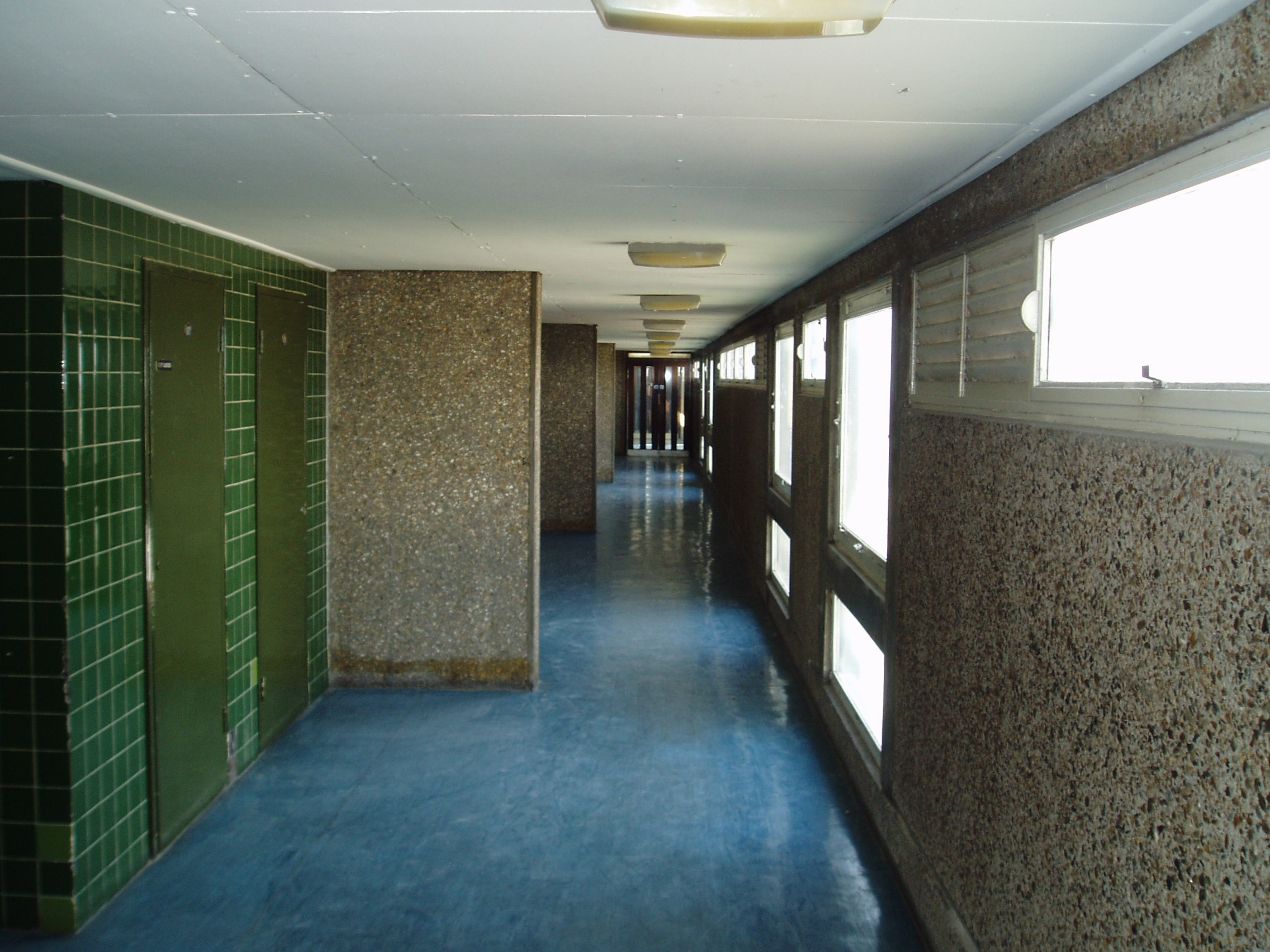
One of Trellick Tower's interior corridors

With the introduction of the "right to buy" council homes, several of the flats were bought by their tenants. On 8 October 1984 a new residents' association was formed. As a result of pressure from the occupants, several security improvements including a door entry intercom system were installed, and a concierge was hired in 1987. In 1994 residents in the tower, along with other residents in Kensington & Chelsea council properties, elected to self-manage the properties, in order to avoid increased rents and the threat of eviction.

Four low-power television relay transmitters with aerials were added to the communications equipment on top of the lift tower in December 1989, to solve reception problems for some residents of adjacent districts, including Notting Hill and Westbourne Grove. The transmitter installation is referred to by the BBC and Ofcom as "Kensal Town".

In 1991, Sand Helsel, Professor of Architecture at RMIT, made a BBC documentary praising Trellick Tower, which helped to change public opinion in its favour. The tower subsequently became more respectable owing to its location close to Notting Hill and the gentrification of the neighbouring Golborne Road. Property prices rose and flats in the tower came to be regarded as highly desirable residences; requests to sell flats began to be posted on the tower's communal noticeboard. By 1999 a flat in the tower could sell for £150,000 (£287,000 as of 2025). In 2013 a three-bedroom end apartment (with views on three sides) was let for £2,600 pcm (per calendar month). The tower itself is a local landmark and was awarded a Grade II* listing in 1998, which included the main building and the adjacent row of shops and amenities. Also included is a doctor's surgery with the original shop front and layout. Most of the flats are still social housing, but a significant minority are now privately owned.

On 19 April 2017 the top floors of the tower caught fire, believed to have been started by a discarded cigarette. There were no injuries. The building's listed status meant that the concrete facade could not be covered over with cladding, which is thought to have prevented a far worse fire similar to Grenfell Tower which happened a few months later.

In 2021, plans were announced to demolish neighbouring buildings and to extensively alter the tower's immediate surroundings, including by adding a sixteen-storey block at an immediate right angle to the tower. The charity Open City described the plans as "the latest in an ongoing programme of incremental demolition of Goldfinger's world renowned social housing estate which has already seen the neighbourhood's Edenham Residential Care Home knocked down", adding the tower to its 'Buildings at Risk' list. The plans, which also involved destroying a graffiti wall, faced fierce opposition and were abandoned in December 2021.

== Cultural references ==
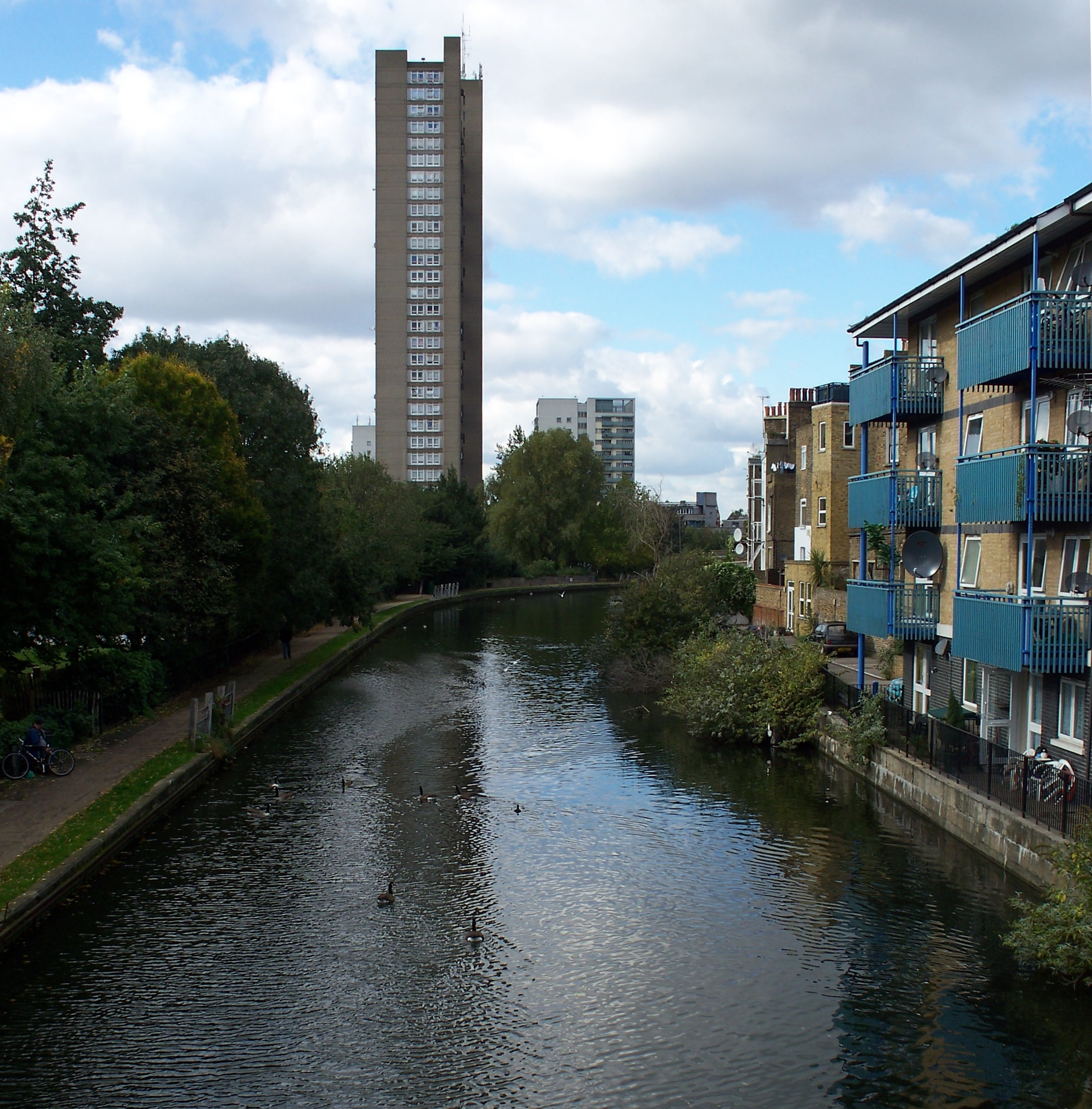
Trellick Tower as seen from Westbourne Park

Trellick Tower has appeared on T-shirts, featuring in adverts, films, and songs, and attracting visitors. The tower was the filming location for Shopping (1994), written and directed by Paul W. S. Anderson, as well as being featured in the film For Queen and Country (1988), starring Denzel Washington. Additionally, it can be seen in the films Withnail & I (1987), London Kills Me (1991), Never Let Me Go (2010) and Paddington (2014).

The tower is believed to have been the inspiration behind J. G. Ballard's dystopian novel High Rise (1975) and its 2016 film adaptation directed by Ben Wheatley. The tower also features in Martin Amis' black comedy novel London Fields. Several music videos have featured Trellick Tower, including "Slam Dunk (Da Funk)" from Five and releases from Blur (which refers to the tower in their song "Best Days").

Trellick Tower has appeared in several television adverts, including idents for the BBC's coverage of the 2012 Olympics. The whole of one side of the building's exterior was used for the credits for the BBC's children's television show Incredible Games, starring David Walliams, in the early 1990s. The tower was used as a filming location (and a character's home) in The Professionals episode "The Madness Of Mickey Hamilton". Additionally, the tower was used as the location of game developer Colin Ritman's apartment in the Black Mirror interactive episode/film Bandersnatch. It was later featured on the cover for the Meanwhile EP produced by the band Gorillaz, after previously appearing in the music videos of both "Tomorrow Comes Today" and "Sleeping Powder".

In May 2024 the tower was celebrated in Andi Oliver's Fabulous Feasts on BBC Two, with celebrity chef Andi Oliver.

== See also ==
- Tall buildings in London
- Tower blocks in Great Britain
