= Waiting for the Roar =

Studio album by Fastway
- Released: February 1986
- Studios: Abbey Road Studios, London, UK
- Genres: Hard rock, heavy metal
- Length: 44:37
- Label: Columbia
- Producer: Terry Manning

Fastway chronology
All Fired Up (1984)	Waiting for the Roar (1986)	Trick or Treat (1986)

Singles from Waiting for the Roar
- 1. "The World Waits for You" Released: 1986

Professional ratings
Review scores
Source	Rating
AllMusic	3/5 stars
Collector's Guide to Heavy Metal	3/10

Waiting for the Roar is the third studio album by the English heavy metal band Fastway. It was recorded at Abbey Road Studios in 1985 and released in 1986.

== Track listing ==
Side one
No.	Title	Writer(s)	Length
1.	"Waiting for the Roar"	Dave King, Shane Carroll, Alan Connor, Paul Reid, Terry Manning	4:03
2.	"The World Waits For You"	King, Carroll, Connor, Reid, T. Manning	7:35
3.	"Little By Little"	King, Carroll, Connor, Reid	5:53
4.	"Change"	King, Carroll, Connor, Reid	6:03
5.	"Rock On"	King, Carroll, Connor, Reid	3:22

Side two
No.	Title	Writer(s)	Length
6.	"Tired of Your Love"	King, T. Manning, Cory Manning	4:35
7.	"Move Over"	Joplin	3:21
8.	"Kill Me With Your Heart"	King, Carroll, Connor, Reid, T. Manning	4:01
9.	"Girl"	King, T. Manning	4:04
10.	"Back Door Man"	King, Carroll, Connor, Reid, T. Manning	3:17

Cassette edition bonus track
No.	Title	Writer(s)	Length
11.	"Tired of Your Love"	King, Carroll, Connor, Reid	3:59

CD edition bonus track
No.	Title	Writer(s)	Length
11.	"Doin' Just Fine"	King, Carroll, Connor, Reid	3:15

== Personnel ==
Fastway

- "Fast" Eddie Clarke – lead/rhythm guitar
- Dave King – lead vocals
- Shane Carroll – rhythm guitar
- Alan Connor – drums
- Paul Reid – bass guitar

Additional musicians

- Terry Manning – synthesizers, backing vocals
- Carl Marsh – Fairlight programming and orchestration
- Chris Thompson – additional backing vocals
- London Studio Orchestra

Production

- Terry Manning – producer, engineer, mixing at Mayfair Studios, London
- Paul Mortimer, Noel Rafferty – assistant engineers
- Simon Sullivan – mixing assistant
