= Meanwhile Gardens =

Public park in North Kensington, London, England

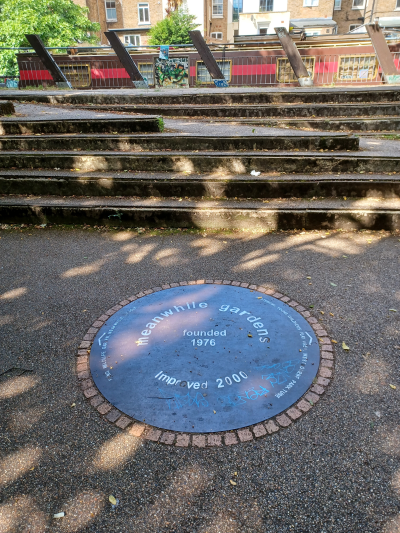
- Meanwhile Gardens commemorative plaque, 2024
- Interactive map of Meanwhile Gardens
- Location: 156-158 Kensal Road, Westbourne Park, London, W10 5BN; United Kingdom
- Coordinates: 51.52457494°N 0.20523616°W
- Area: 1.6 hectares (4.0 acres)
- Established: 1976
- Operator: Meanwhile Gardens Community Association
- Public transit: Westbourne Park

Meanwhile Gardens is an urban park, community garden and nature reserve in Westbourne, North Kensington, London.

== History ==
=== Foundation ===
Meanwhile Gardens was created from waste ground within a working-class/immigrant district in what was then referred to as "North Paddington". This space had become available following tenement slum clearance and rehousing in the early 1970s. The park was created by community effort in 1976, initiated by local artist, sculptor and engineer Jamie McCulloch, who led a neighbourhood group to resist speculative commercial development taking over the site.

McCulloch successfully petitioned Westminster City Council to consider allowing community gardening to use the space instead. While this was being decided in court, the Council issued a Meanwhile, Permit to prevent any activity taking place on the site. Eventually, the community won their case and the Meanwhile Gardens Community Association was established. Although the land was now protected, no funds were allocated for its further development as a park or garden. The developing park was named "Meanwhile Gardens" as "an act of defiance", as an ironic nod to the Meanwhile, Permit, and to reflect the potential impermanence of the park's existence (due to the continued ambivalence of Westminster City Council towards the project, and the ongoing threat of the space being taken over in the future by commercial land developers).

From the start, the Meanwhile Gardens project was intended to involve all members of the local community, utilising any available skills and helping people to explore and develop fresh ones. The work was begun by a band of dedicated and enthusiastic volunteers, using donated plants and materials. Further advice was provided by the landscape section of the Greater London Council, under John Medhurst.

=== Growth ===
The growing community gardens became a "green lung" within a densely populated London neighbourhood, and maintained its policy of allowing all members of the community to have opportunities. By the early 1980s, partly thanks to favourable funding by the Greater London Council, the Manpower Commission and others, park features and activities included an extensive BMX bike ramp system and an affiliated boating/boatbuilding club in addition to skateboarding, concerts and parties.

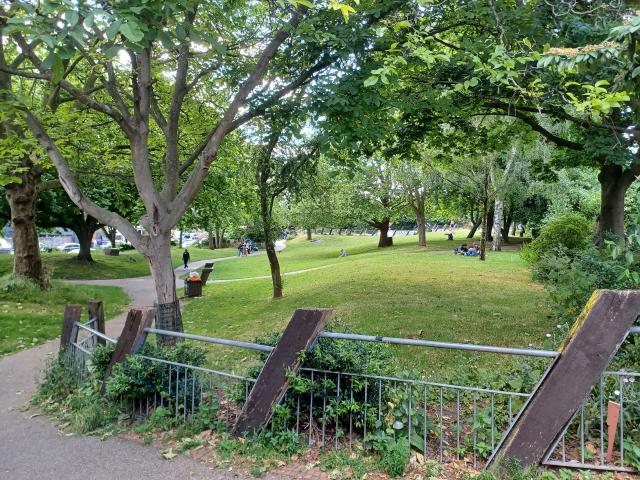
Meanwhile Gardens from the east, summer 2024

In 1981, film-maker Steve Shaw made a short documentary about the park's origins and its ongoing community, which was shown on Channel 4 in 1983.

Circa 1990, the Mind mental health charity took over the running of a half-acre space within the park as "The Wildlife Garden", hosting a range of horticulture and nature-based programmes teaching both the foundation of good gardening practices and the focused, mindful engagement of all the senses with their surroundings. The Wildlife Garden won the UK-MAB Urban Wildlife Award for Excellence in 2008.

Meanwhile Gardens was transferred from the City of Westminster to the Royal Borough of Kensington and Chelsea on 1 April 1994.

In 1999, the council granted a longer-term lease for part of the park. In 2000, various refurbishment were made to assorted park spaces by landscape architects Planet Earth, with support from National Lottery funding and from the British Waterways Board. The Meanwhile Gardens Community Association currently operates out of an unleased disused factory building in the north-west corner of the park, simply referred to as "the Factory Building". In 2007, the MGCA (alongside other community members and local ward councillor Pat Mason) successfully fought off an attempt to develop the western end of the park for new commercial housing.

=== The park today ===
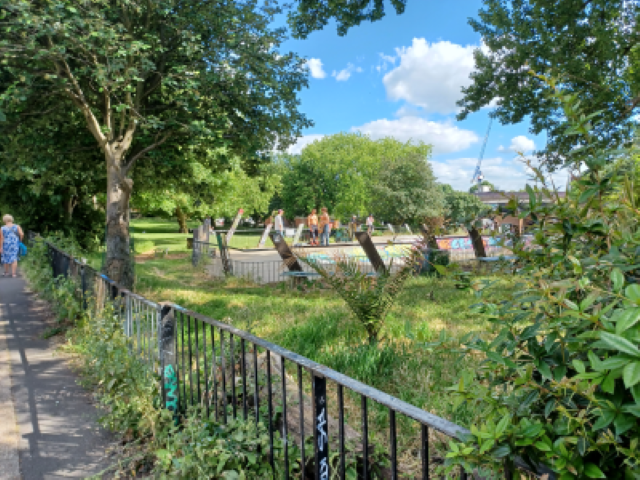
Meanwhile Gardens, approaching skatepark, summer 2024

The current park features community gardening, volunteering opportunities, the Play Hut (a purpose-built, eco-friendly community centre for young children and their parents and carers, free to Kensington & Chelsea residents), one of London's oldest skateparks (an open-to-all, free-to-use facility with three interlocking bowls of various sizes), a Moroccan garden, and play equipment.

Meanwhile Gardens has also had a long-term association with public music, featuring space for steel bands to rehearse and perform (the Metronomes Steel Orchestra, founded in 1973 by Phil Dubique and Irvin Corridan, has been the resident band since 1989), and hosting a regular busker's festival.

== Location ==
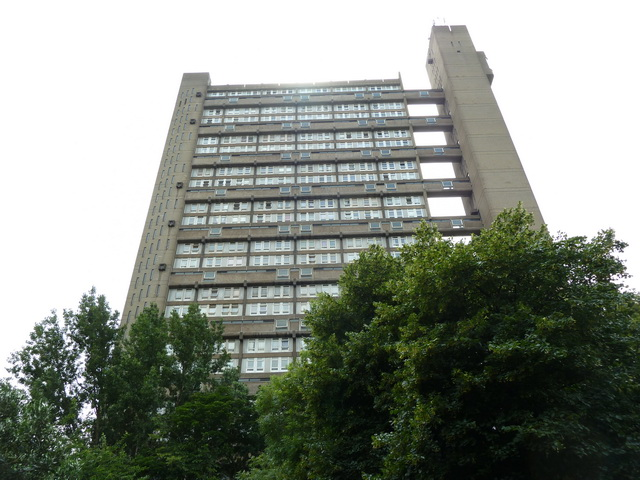
Trellick Tower, which stands immediately south of Meanwhile Gardens

Meanwhile Gardens is situated on the mutual border of Westbourne and Kensal Town, immediately north-west of Westbourne Park tube station and the Westbourne Park stretch of the Westway. It is bounded by the Paddington Arm of the Grand Union Canal running along its north edge, Kensal Road along its north-western edge, Elkstone Road along its south-eastern edge, and Great Western Road along the eastern edge. There are entrances from the canal towpath and neighbouring streets, with the formal address for the park being in Kensal Road.

Trellick Tower is situated immediately south of and adjacent to the park, a little west of the midpoint.

== Cultural impact ==
The Meanwhile Gardens Community Association continues to consider the park as representative of the ongoing local Westbourne Park community, and as a rebuke to urban developments which exclude people who have less money and social status. A statement on the History page of the Association's website, dating back to 2019, warns that:

...the public space in this part of the borough is becoming more and more gentrified – Portobello Road is morphing into bijou shops and branded coffee shops; Golborne Road, with its traders, Middle Eastern and Portuguese communities, is following suit. As space that really reflects the spirit of the residents of the neighbourhood disappears, those residents do not. They continue to live in the high-rises and estates. We cannot have public space designed only for the very well-off just minutes away – in the divided society we live in, we need spaces that truly bring people together in common causes, activities and everyday pleasures.

Beyond its links with West London steel band culture and London busking culture, the park has inspired the name of three music albums to date – Meanwhile Gardens by psychedelic rock band Levitation (released 1994, reissued 2015), Meanwhile Gardens by Dutch folk singer Dick Pels (2018) and Meanwhile Gardens by veteran London punk band Chelsea (2021). Hawkwind spin-off Inner City Unit played sets at the park 1979–1980, several of which included former Tyrannosaurus Rex percussionist Steve Peregrin Took guesting on vocals. One such concert on 6 May 1980, circulates as a bootleg. Reggae band Aswad recorded their album Live and Direct in Meanwhile Gardens in August 1983, capturing a live set they played as part of the Notting Hill Carnival. The album was released in November of that year.

The park has inspired the name of the "Meanwhile Gardens" initiative by British sustainable development organisation Groundwork, which helps to create and maintain community gardens on space that has been earmarked for future development.
