= Ron Tree =

British singer (born 1963)

Ronald Tree (born 8 April 1963 in Leeds, England) is an English musician and songwriter, best known as frontman and bassist for the English space rock band Hawkwind from 1995 to 2002. He also played both these roles in the reunited Steve Took's Horns in 2002, taking the place of Steve Peregrin Took. He later became the vocalist/songwriter in the Hawklords, alongside Jerry Richards, Harvey Bainbridge, Dave Pearce and Tom Ashurst.

== History ==
Prior to joining Hawkwind, Tree played with 2000DS, Plato's Jacuzzi, Captain Jesus and the Sunray Dream (who released two limited-edition "private press" LPs), and his own band, Bastard. He contributed vocals and bass to Bajina in 2000, with Dino Ferari (drums) and Judge Trev Thoms (lead guitar). Also with Ferari and Thoms, he recorded two new tracks for the Steve Took's Horns album, Blow It!!!, built around a session of three tracks recorded 29 November 1977 at Pathway Studios, London, by Took with Ferari and Thoms; that album was released on 10 August 2004. After these musical excursions he contributed vocals and bass for Thoms (lead guitar and vocals), Jim Hawkman (synthesizer), and John Morgan (drums) with the Mother Of All Bands (M.O.A.B.).

Since then, amongst other various musical projects, he has played with the Leeds-based band The Sewer Suckers, who supported bands such as My Older Ego in his home town. Hawklords have annually released an album, namely; We Are One (2012), Dream (2013), Censored (2014), Re:volution (2015), Fusion (2016) and Six (2017); although Tree did not appear on the latter.
