= Inner City Unit =

UK music group

- Also known as: Sphynx, Imperial Pompadours
- Origin: London, England
- Genres: psychedelic, punk
- Years active: 1979–1985
- Labels: Riddle, Avatar, Demi Monde, Flicknife, Jettisoundz
- Past members: see "Personnel" below
- Website: www.doremi.co.uk/icu/

Inner City Unit were a London-based popular music group active from 1979 through to 1985, their music style encompassing psychedelia and punk rock. They recorded four studio albums, one studio EP and one compilation album of previously unreleased material.

The group were established by ex-Hawkwind saxophonist Nik Turner, joined by bassist and keyboardist Phil Reeves (known as Dead Fred). Trev Thoms was the guitarist of the first incarnation and Steve Pond the second. Ermano Ghisio-Erba (known as Dino Ferari) and Mick Lee (known as Mick Stupp) were the drummers. Andy Anderson (drums) and Michael Vickerage (known as Mo Vicarage) (keyboards) played live and recorded with the group in the early days. Barry Downes (known as Baz Magneto), GP Wayne (known as Little Bit), Dave Anderson and Nazar Alikhan had stints with the group playing bass.

Since their split, various members have got together on occasions to record or play live using the name.

== History ==
=== Formation 1977–1979 ===
In 1977, after Nik Turner had been dismissed from Hawkwind, he traveled to Egypt and made some portable recordings playing flute in the King's Chamber of Great Pyramid of Giza. With producer Steve Hillage he worked these recordings into the album Xitintoday (exit into day) with contributions from members of Gong, Harry Williamson and Andy Anderson. His group performed live as Sphynx.

With Williamson he conceived the protest single "Nuclear Waste" issued as Fast Breeder and the Radio Actors, with vocals from Sting, and then contributed to the album Fairy Tales by Williamson and Gilli Smyth's group Mother Gong. On this session he met keyboardist Michael Vickerage (known as Mo Vicarage) and drummer Ermano Ghisio-Erba (known as Dino Ferari), both of whom would be pulled into Turner's band. Erba brought in guitarist Trev Thoms with whom he had played in Steve Took's Horns, (Note: Steve Peregrin Took would continue to work with his former sidemen by guesting with ICU at assorted gigs during 1979-1980, particularly at free concerts at Notting Hill Gate's Meanwhile Gardens.) Thoms in turn brought in keyboard player Phil Reeves (known as Dead Fred), the two having played in Steve Gibbons Band together. The new name Inner City Unit had been suggested to Turner by his close friend, the graphic designer Barney Bubbles.

=== First incarnation 1979–1982 ===
The group recorded four tracks at Foel Studios in April, with "Solitary Ashtray" (originally titled "Solitary Astrid") issued as a single on their own Riddle Records imprint, backed with a dub version titled "So__t_ry As__id"; the remaining three tracks ("Watching the Grass Grow", "Cars Eat With Auto Face" and "Alright On The Flight") would later be included on the Punkadelic compilation. The group debuted at a gig in Liverpool, then appeared at the 1979 Glastonbury Festival and at the first Futurama (The World's First Science Fiction Music Festival) on 9 September in Leeds.

By the end of 1979, the line-up of Turner, Thoms and Reeves had been joined by Barry Downes (known as Baz Magneto, bass) and Mick Lee (known as Mick Stupp, drums). They cut demos of "Space Invaders" and "Polyethylene" for Polydor Records in December, but no deal was forth-coming - these tracks would also be included on the Punkadelic album. They recorded the album Pass Out at Nick Lowe's UK Pro Studios with Paul Riley, also issued on Riddle Records with a sleeve by Bubbles. (Note: The title Pass Out is rendered as a central vertical column with the letters from each word interspersed with each other, the words flaring in opposite directions, making it difficult to decipher. Side 1 label depicted Apollo–Soyuz, a reference to skylab which was falling from Earth's orbit at the time, being the subject of the ska medley "Amyl Nitrate", itself a cover of Carlos Malcolm and His Afro-Jamaican Rhythms' "Bonanza Ska". Side 2 label had a picture of Chairman Mao, with the legend of "Poppa Mm Mao Mao", reflecting Bubbles love of 1960s American garage/psychedelic rock.) The album consisted of new recordings of the previous tracks, with covers of the two popular Turner compositions for Hawkwind, "Master of the Universe" and "Brainstorm", as well as a cover of "Nuclear Waste".

The non-album single "Paradise Beach" (based on Richard Wagner's "Ride of the Valkyries") was released in March. Steve Redman (known as Speed Machine) momentarily replaced Downes. (Note: Redman performed one gig playing bass at the Music Machine on 26 March 1980 but his tenure was cut short when he fell off the stage and landed on his head.) Turner appeared with The Stranglers on "Nice 'n' Sleazy" at Rainbow Theatre London on 3 and 4 April for The Stranglers and Friends – Live in Concert. Turner guested on Sham 69's The Game and his group supported Sham 69 on a British tour, with G.P. Wayne (known as Little Bit) filling in on bass. (Note: The tour was to run from 13 April 1980 in Cardiff through to 23 at Middlesbrough and was to prove to be Sham 69's final tour, with Jimmy Pursey unraveling before its conclusion, the final two dates being cancelled. Turner, who had guested on the single "Tell the Children", had a guest slot during the headliners set, and made television appearances promoting the single's release. Wayne chronicled the events in Too Late To Be A Viking (self-published, August 2016), although he misdates them to 1979.) Soon after Wayne and Stupp left, with Erba rejoining and Reeves playing bass as well as keyboards.

Bubbles had been given studio time at Phoenix Studios and requested the four-piece, along with Robert Calvert, (Note: Calvert recorded "Brand New Cadillac" and a version of "I'm a King Bee" that was later issued on the Liveout cassette tape; the album version of "I'm a King Bee" was performed by Turner.) record versions of his favourite 1960s garage/psychedelic rock songs. 13 tracks formed the first side of an album titled Ersatz attributed to The Imperial Pompadours, while the second side consisted of a nightmare sound collage pieced together of Wagnerian performances and readings from Mein Kampf. Turner and Thoms both guested on Calvert's Hype album.

In 1981, the band recorded the album The Maximum Effect at Trident Studios with Howard Massey for Avatar Records, with sleeve by Bubbles and photographer Brian Griffin, with a guest appearance by The Damned's Captain Sensible. It included the singles "Beer, Baccy, Bingo and Benidorm!" (extended holiday version) with an appearance from the comedian Max Wall and "Bones of Elvis" with a contribution from cornetist Bill Boston. It also included covers of The Shangri-Las "Remember (Walking in the Sand)", the jazz standard "In the Mood" recorded by Glenn Miller, and "Sid's Song" being a traditional English folk song known variously as "Newlyn Town", "Roving Blade" or "Wild and Wicked Youth". This line-up also contributed the tracks "Raj Neesh" and "Human Beings" to the various artists compilation album Hawkwind, Friends and Relations.

By mid-1982 the band were struggling with some members drug problems, Huw Lloyd-Langton filling in on guitar at times in Thoms absence. In July Flicknife Records released the album Punkadelic compiled from various previously unreleased recordings, including a cover of Jan and Arnie's "Gas Money", and the tracks "God Disco" and "Disco Tango" from a side project involving Andreas Wyden.

Turner was invited back into Hawkwind for their Choose Your Masques tour and pulled Reeves in with him. While in Hawkwind, they would perform live versions of "Watching the Grass Grow" (a recording from Stonehenge Free Festival 1984 appearing on This Is Hawkwind, Do Not Panic) and "Human Beings" adapted as "Ghost Dance" (on Hawkwind Anthology).

=== Second incarnation 1984–1985 ===
After Turner and Reeves departure from Hawkwind, they regrouped with guitarist Steve Pond (who had sometimes augmented the earlier live group playing synthesiser) and bass player Dave Anderson to record New Anatomy at Foel Studios with Brian Snelling for Anderson's Demi Monde Records, with sleeve design by Nazar Alikhan. Pond programmed a LinnDrum for the album but Stupp returned for the supporting live dates. It included a cover of Johnny Burnette and The Rock and Roll Trio's "Lonesome Train (On A Lonesome Track)" and the traditional folk tune "Wildhunt". "Help, Sharks!" had a promotional video recorded for it, included on the Pirates of the Panasoniks (Jettisoundz) various artists compilation VHS tape, but the song was not issued as a single. The band toured the album from January 1985 onward, but conflict with Anderson resulted in his departure, Reeves playing both bass and keyboards. (Note: Calvert joined the band at Dingwalls on 21 March 1985 (semi-professionally video recorded) and again on 11 May at the derelict Royal Albert Dock, Liverpool in the room that would be renovated into the studio for This Morning, but his depression partly brought on by having his hat stolen off of his head curtailed any further collaboration. At the same event, Iconoclasts recorded Merseyside Alive '85 which was mastered, pressed and released within 24 hours in an attempt to get into the Guinness Book of Records.)

In May they recorded the Blood and Bone 12" EP at Boilerhouse Studios with Nick Green for Jettisoundz Records, followed quickly in July by the album The President Tapes at Alaska Studios with Iain O'Higgins for Flicknife. Sleeves were designed by Mary Cason. Blood And Bone contained a cover of Red Crayola's "Hurricane Fighter Plane". The Presidents Tapes included the track "Stonehenge Who Knows" originally written for Hawkwind's The Earth Ritual Preview project. Four tracks from The Imperial Pompadours album were re-recorded: Vince Taylor's "Brand New Cadillac" and The Nightcrawlers' "Little Black Egg" on the EP; Terry Noland's "There Was Fungus Among Us" and The Fe-Fi-Four Plus 2's "I Wanna Come Back (From the World of LSD)" on the album. Alikhan joined the band on bass for the live dates in support of the releases, but the band fell apart by the end of the year.

=== Post-ICU ===
Reeves, Pond and Stupp continued using the name The Maximum Effect issuing the self-released 7" single "Espana" backed with "The Wrecker". Stupp would leave, and the remaining two were joined by Cason to act as a backing band for Calvert at his Queen Elizabeth Hall appearance on 1 October 1986, followed by a tour of Britain.

In the 1990s, Thoms used the Inner City Unit name for his own band with original drummer Erba, releasing one album Now You Know the Score as Judge Trev's Inner City Unit.

In 2001, a version of ICU combining members from the first two incarnations played two shows. A fourth version of the band played the closing party of the 2006 FennerFest in Slough.

The final ICU tour proper happened in 2016 with the band comprising Nik Turner (Vocals, Sax), Steve Pond (guitar, vocals), Nazar Ali-Khan (bass) and Kevin Walker (drums).

== Critical reception ==
AllMusic's retrospective review assessed Pass Out as "one of the freshest sounding of all post-'70s spin-offs from [Hawkwind]."

The group's support slot for The Psychedelic Furs on 21 September 1980 at Lyceum Ballroom was reviewed by Dante Bonutto for Record Mirror as "a real hoot, a five piece plus two strong girlie chorus who thankfully didn't take themselves too seriously. But then when you play a ska version of the 1812 Overture and hurl handfuls of rotting flora into the audience I don't suppose you can really afford to. Still, after the stark catastrophe of Ludus they were certainly a healthy blast of oxygen." (Note: The fifth member would have been Steve Pond on synthesiser. The two girls would have been from the backing singers on The Maximum Effect album, certainly Reeves wife Clair, and possibly either Corrina (who was in Androids of Mu) or Vermilion Sands (American Sylvia Thornton, editor of Search & Destroy and former wife of V. Vale, who worked for and released two singles on Illegal Records).)

Malcolm Dome in Record Mirror thought The Maximum Effect a "pure music hall eccentricity laced with modern rock idioms... a cross between the Goons, Max Miller, early Stranglers fury and Hawkwind style phrasing... The result, at best, is sharply cynical and bitingly effective." He highlights "Bones of Elvis" and "Beer, Baccy, Bingo and Benidorm" which "hidden in with the humour is a decided strain of desperation that hits home very solidly indeed... But, sadly, there is an inconsistency running through ME that at times exasperates. So what promised to be an effective new humourist album ends up as adequate but no more." AllMusic retrospectively acknowledges "The faithful declare Maximum Effect to be Inner City Unit's finest hour - and... it's impossible to disagree... only the group's growing penchant for "obvious" humo[u]r detracting from some excellent performances. Maximum Effect sounds practically state of the art."

Attila the Stockbroker (using the name John Opposition) reviewed Punkadelic for Sounds as "weird and wonderful" while noting its "diversity of styles". AllMusic assessed the album as "Should one wish to make comparisons, the "regular" versions... are more complete than those included here... [but] this set is just as enjoyable as anything else the band released."

Andy Ross in Sounds assessed New Anatomy poorly as "While ICU score full marks for variety... the overall standard of composition is average, the production limp, and the singing anaemic." AllMusic's retrospective assessment is also critical, declaring "they turned in one of the most disappointing records in the entire Hawkwind family tree, a disheveled, featureless, and melody-less gaggle of half-songs highlighted by two numbers ("Birdland" and "Forbidden Planet") but so hamstrung by the other eight that, even today, it's difficult to discern quite what they were trying to do."

Sounds classed The President Tapes as a "wiggy-brilliant album [but] no go on the breaking new barriers." Dave Thompson reviewed the album for Melody Maker as "something of an acquired taste... stands guilty of not taking itself seriously... These songs, like the band who created them, are oddballs and, as such, should be cherished." Thompson's retrospective review for AllMusic is consistent with his contemporary analysis, being "up there with the very best music the band ever made, a tightly focused but, simultaneously, deliciously loose collection of riffs, rhythms, and - best of all - ideas that thoroughly corral all the promise that the band ever radiated without losing sight of the anarchy that was its stock in trade."

== Other activities ==
Turner started his rhythm and blues and jazz rock outfit Nik Turner's Fantastic Allstars in the late 1980s. They eventually released an album Kubanno Kickasso! in 2001.

Stupp played with many different bands with varying styles, moving from drums to guitar over time.

In the 1980s, original guitarist Thoms started the three-piece heavy metal band Atomgods which, for a while, also featured Pond on bass. Thoms died of pancreatic cancer on 8 December 2010.

Pond and Reeves played together as Krankschaft, they released an album of Robert Calvert songs under this name, joined by Mick Stupp on drums for the live album "Sonic Rock Solstice 2010". Following Reeves' Departure in 2011 Pond recruited the rhythm section of Alex Tsentides (bass, Ex The Enid) and Kevin walker (Drums) They stopped playing all ICU and Calvert Material and released 3 Albums of their own material, they continue to play the UK festival circuit. Often playing an ICU song or two in tribute to Turner and Thoms.

== Discography ==
=== Studio albums ===
- Pass Out (20 February 1980, Riddle)
- The Maximum Effect (June 1981, Avatar Record & Screenworks)
- New Anatomy (1984, Demi Monde)
- The President's Tapes (1985, Flicknife)

=== Demos album ===
- Punkadelic (July 1982, Flicknife)

=== Various artists compilations ===
- Hawkwind, Friends and Relations (1981, Flicknife)

=== Extended plays ===
- Blood and Bone (1985, Jettisoundz) 12" vinyl also issued as a VHS tape

=== Singles ===
- "Solitary Ashray" / "So__t_ry As__id" [dub version] (September 1979, Riddle) 7" vinyl
- "Paradise Beach" / "Amyl Nitrate" (March 1980, Riddle) 7" vinyl
- "Beer, Baccy, Bingo and Benidorm!" [extended holiday version] / "In The Mood (Nude)" (1981, Avatar Record & Screenworks) 7" red vinyl
- "Bones Of Elvis" / "Sid's Song" (1981, Avatar Record & Screenworks) 7" vinyl

== Personnel ==
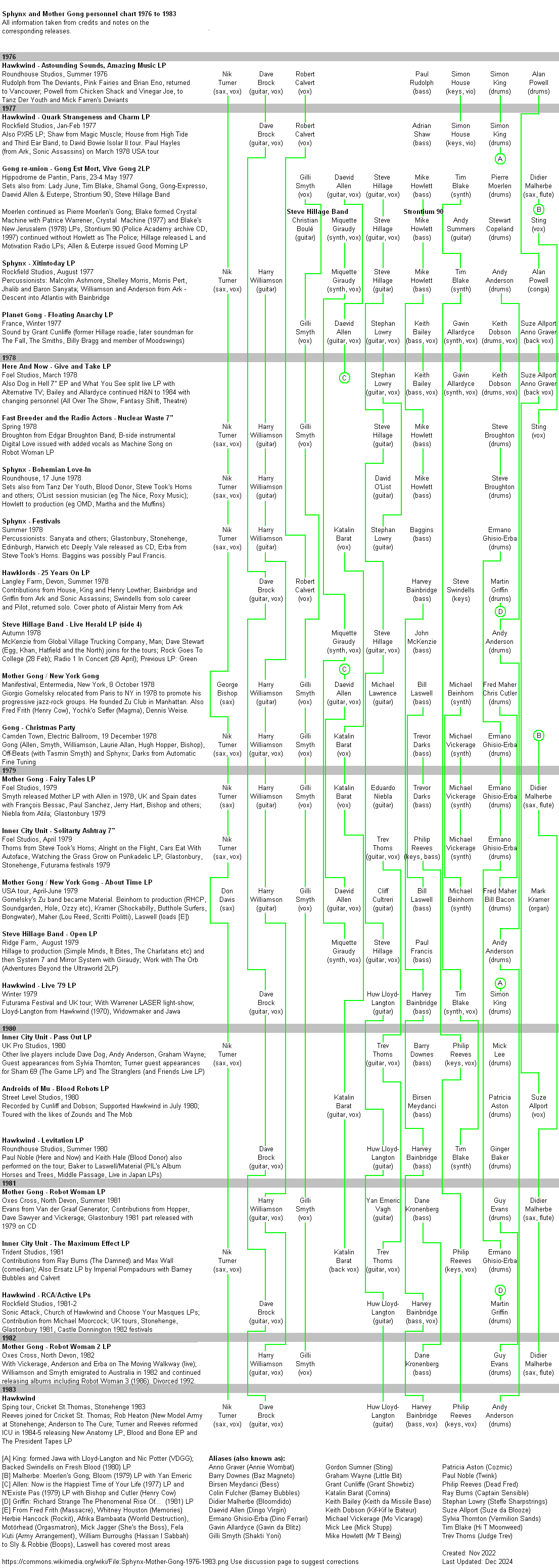
Sphynx, Mother Gong and ICU Personnel Chart 1976 to 1983

- Nik Turner - vocals, saxophone, flute - all releases
- Phil Reeves (known as Dead Fred) - vocals, Keyboards, bass guitar - all releases
- Trev Thoms - vocals, guitar (1979–82) - Pass Out, The Maximum Effect, Punkadelic
- J Me - vocals, Keyboards (1982) - Ersatz
- Steve Pond - vocals, guitar (1984–85) - New Anatomy, Blood and Bone, The President Tapes
- Barry Downes (known as Baz Magneto) - bass guitar (1979–80) - Pass Out, Punkadelic
- GP Wayne (known as Little Bit) - bass guitar (1980) - live performances only
- Dave Anderson - bass guitar (1984) - New Anatomy
- Nazar Alikhan - bass guitar (1985) - live performances only
- Michael Vickerage (known as Mo Vicarage) - Keyboards (1979) - Punkadelic
- Ermano Ghisio Erba (known as Dino Ferari) - drums (1979, 1981–82) - The Maximum Effect, Punkadelic
- Andy Anderson - drums (1979) - Punkadelic
- Mick Lee (known as Mick Stupp) - drums (1979–80, 1984–85) - Pass Out, Punkadelic, Blood and Bone, The President Tapes
