= Murder of Kelso Cochrane =

1959 murder of an Antiguan expatriate to Britain

Kelso Cochrane
- Born: 26 September 1927; Antigua and Barbuda
- Died: 17 May 1959 (aged 31); London, England
- Cause of death: Stabbing
- Known for: Victim of unsolved murder

Kelso Cochrane (26 September 1927 – 17 May 1959) was an Antiguan expatriate to Britain whose murder led to racial tensions in London.

== Life ==
Cochrane, who was born in Antigua, had a failed marriage while living in the United States; following this, he was deported back to Antigua on the grounds that he had stayed longer than allowed. He made the decision to move to England in 1954, arriving at the port of Plymouth before boarding a train to Paddington, London, where he made his home in the Notting Hill neighbourhood. He was a carpenter by trade and wanted to save enough money to go to law school.

== Death ==
After fracturing his thumb in a work accident, he attended Paddington General Hospital. While walking home, shortly after midnight on 17 May 1959, the 31-year-old Cochrane was set upon at the junction of Golborne Road and Southam Street by a gang of white youths, who stabbed him with a stiletto knife. Three other men arrived on the scene, and the youths ran off. The three men took Cochrane to hospital, where he died an hour later.

His funeral procession on 6 June 1959, from St Michael and All Angels Church along Ladbroke Grove to Kensal Green Cemetery, was attended by more than 1,200 people.

== Context ==
Notting Hill was at the time a stronghold for Oswald Mosley's Union Movement and Colin Jordan's White Defence League. The previous year, race riots had broken out in that area. The detective investigating the cases was initially convinced that the youths' motive was robbery, but Cochrane's lack of money was explained by his fiancée, as Cochrane himself had emptied his wallet that morning. The police were believed to have been complacent in their investigation and there were some accusations of a cover-up. Searchlight magazine claimed in 2006 that the police's public denial of any racist motive "was almost certainly a misguided attempt to ensure calm in the area".

Local Union Movement member Peter Dawson later claimed to the Sunday People that it had been a group member who was responsible for the murder. Mosley himself later held a public meeting on the spot where Cochrane had been murdered.

Witnesses were likely to have seen the incident, but were reluctant to report what they saw to the police because they were concerned about possible reprisals. The killer was well known in local circles, but no one was ever charged with the murder. In 2011, the murderer of Cochrane was identified as 20-year-old Patrick Digby. Digby had been arrested shortly after the murder, but was not charged. He'd confessed to several friends and family members and his stepdaughter described him as an "over-the-top racist." In his 2013 memoir This Boy, Alan Johnson writes that his mother witnessed the prelude to the murder and recognised one of the gang.

His murder was emblematic of the racial tensions that existed at the time but also a desire to unite a community. More than 1200 people attended Cochrane's funeral from all sections of the Notting Hill community, white and black. Following the murder, the British Government organised an investigation into race relations, chaired by Amy Ashwood Garvey.

== Aftermath ==
From 1959, activist Claudia Jones organised events to celebrate Caribbean culture "in the face of the hate from the white racists", which are seen as forerunners of the first Notting Hill Carnival in 1964.

A BBC Two television documentary broadcast on 8 April 2006 covered the first visit by Stanley Cochrane to England that year to try to find out more about his brother's death and ask for a police re-investigation. Steve Silver, who was in contact with the BBC researchers and wrote an article in Searchlight coinciding with the programme, later reported that he had heard from Kelso Cochrane's daughter in the U.S. and was able to put her in touch with her uncle.

Cochrane's murder is believed to have led to a decline in support for Oswald Mosley, who was planning a return to politics in the UK. Mosley polled under 3,000 votes in Kensington North in the general election in October.

In the wake of a 2021 petition by Cochrane's family demanding an apology for alleged failings in the investigation of the murder, the Metropolitan Police confirmed that it was assessing historical material in connection with the case.

In July 2024 it was reported that the Cochrane family had obtained the first tranche of papers from the police file on the murder, following a Freedom of Information request. These revealed that the prime suspect was 24-year-old John William Breagan, who admitted to being at the scene of the murder on the night. Breagan had been released from prison ten days previously, having served three years for unprovoked and separate knife attacks on three black men on the same day. After his arrest, he told police: "If I do time for this, when I come out I'll kill the first [black person] I see. I mean that too." Breagan died in Hanwell in 2019.

== Legacy ==
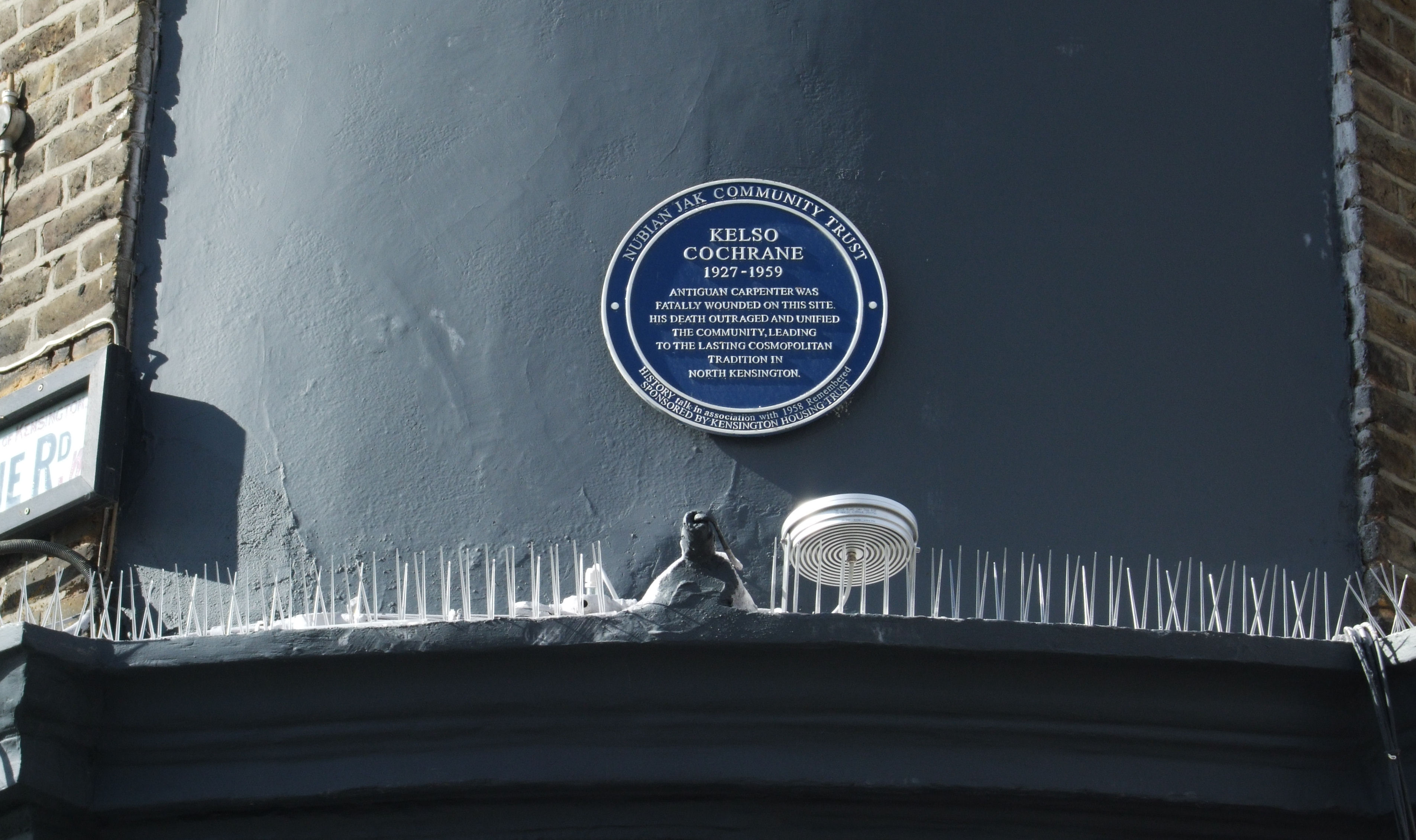
Blue plaque commemorating Cochrane's murder

On Sunday, 17 May 2009, to mark the 50th anniversary of Cochrane's death, a blue plaque organised by the Nubian Jak Community Trust was unveiled at the Golborne Bar & Restaurant, now "Cha Cha x Sister Jane" (36 Golborne Road, London W10), just opposite the place where he was attacked.

In May 2023, a building in a North Kensington new homes development was named Kelso Cochrane House in his memory at a ceremony attended by his family, friends, campaigners and local community members.

== See also ==
- 1958 Notting Hill race riots
