= Lisboa Patisserie =

Long-running Portuguese cafe and bakery in London's Golborne Road

Coordinates: 51.52234°N 0.207475°W

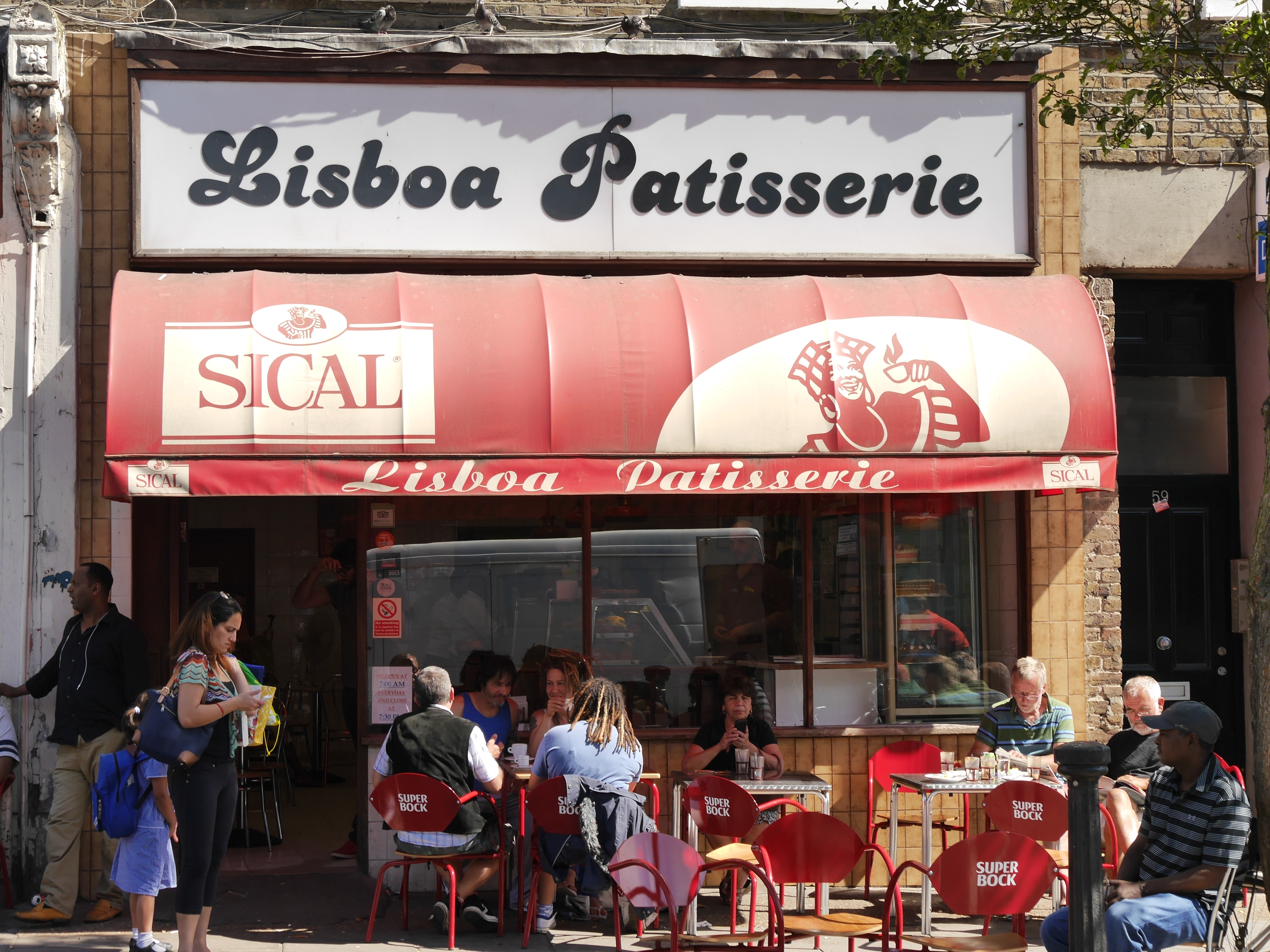
Patisserie Lisboa, exterior

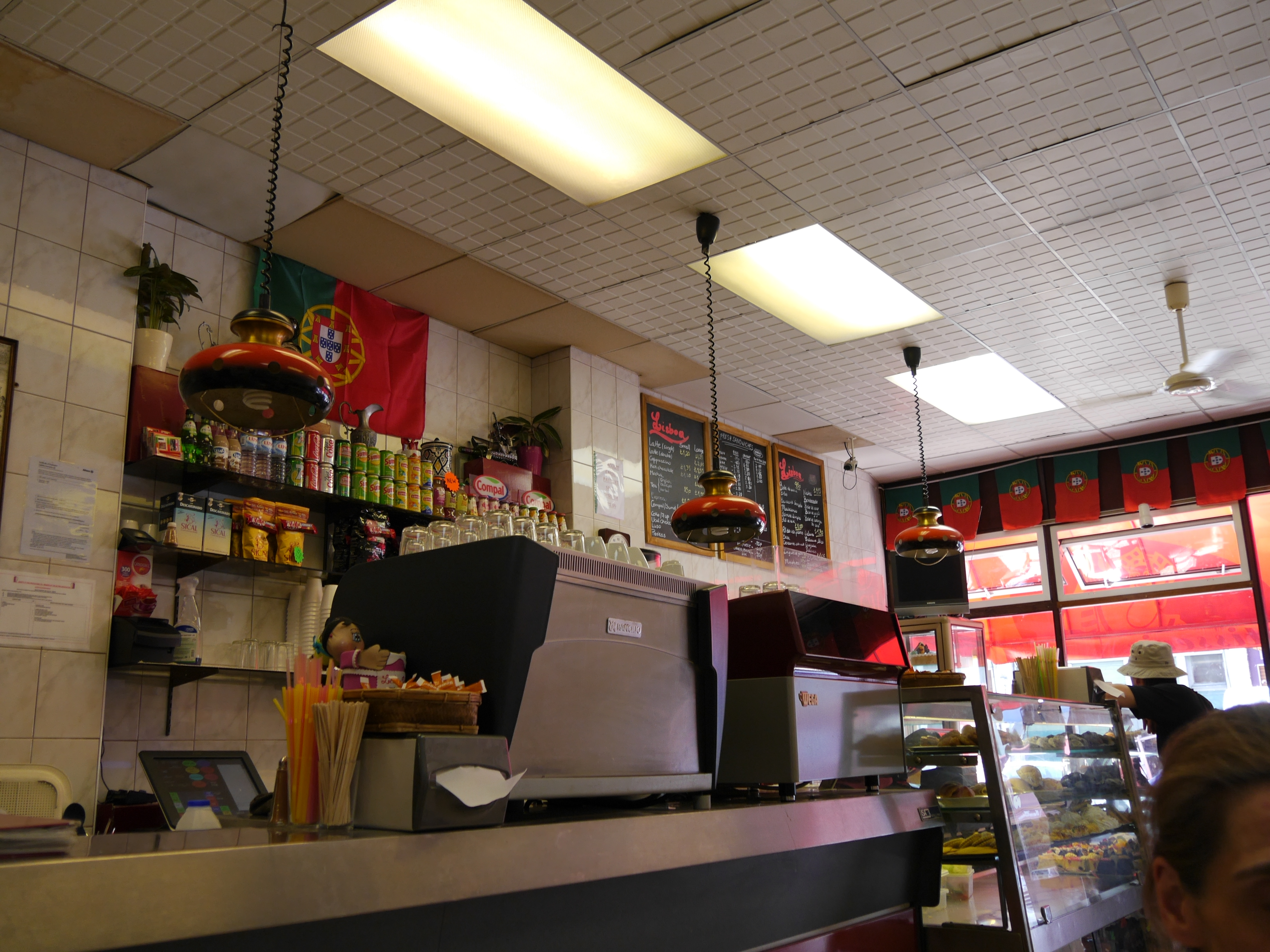
Patisserie Lisboa, interior

Lisboa Patisserie is a long-running Portuguese cafe and bakery in London's Golborne Road. It is particularly known for its pastel de nata cakes.

According to Time Out magazine, "Don’t arrive too late at the weekend if you want one of Lisboa’s famous pastel de nata – they often sell out by 2pm. It’s a humble setting, with plenty of banter from staff and slightly fancier pâtisserie than some other Portuguese cake shops. Bica (Portuguese espresso) was good and strong, and they do a nice galão (latte) too."

Secret Diary of a Call Girl was filmed at this shop for a scene in the first season, first episode. The characters played by Billie Piper and Iddo Goldberg eat at an outdoor table. Ben, played by Goldberg, comments about the custard tart crust being handmade.

Yotam Ottolenghi, the Israeli-born cookery writer and chef-patron says that it is one of his favourite shops in London. It has been in Golborne Road since at least the 1990s.
