= Quasar (band) =

British progressive rock band

- Origin: London, England
- Genres: Neo-prog, progressive rock
- Years active: 1979–present
- Label: Q Records
- Spinoffs: Landmarq
- Members: Keith Turner; Keren Gaiser; Robert Hunt Robinson; Paul Johnson; Clancy Ferrill
- Past members: Geoff Banks; John Clark; Steve Clarke; Mike Kenwright; Cyrus Khajavi; Steen Doosing; Peter Shade; Paul Vigrass; Peter Ware; Susan Robinson; Dillon Tonkin; David Cairns; Dave Wagstaffe; Kevin Fitzgerald; Uwe D'Rose; Steve Leigh; Tracy Hitchings; Toshi Tsuchiya; PJ Shadowhawk; Greg Studley
- Website: quasar.netne.net

Quasar is a British progressive rock band, formed in 1979 by Keith Turner. They found themselves to be amongst a movement of British bands during the early 1980s, including Marillion, Pendragon, IQ, Twelfth Night, Solstice and Pallas, that continued in the progressive rock style created by 1970s bands such as Genesis and Yes. Though Quasar has had quiet times due to leaving members and were based in San Francisco for some years, they are now based back in the UK.

== History ==
In 1979, Quasar was formed when Keith Turner and Mike Kenwright began to write songs in the progressive rock style. Other members of the band included guitarist John Clark, drummer Steve Clarke, and keyboardist Geoff Banks. It didn't take long for changes to occur, however, as Clark left to replace Allan Holdsworth in Bill Bruford's band (credited as "The Unknown" John Clark), whilst Steve Clarke left to tour with Billy Cobham, with Kenwright and Banks also departing the band.

Turner brought in Cyrus Khajavi on guitar, Paul Vigrass on vocals, Peter Ware on keyboards, Peter Shade on percussion and keyboards, and Steen Doosing on drums. In 1982, this lineup released the debut album Fire in the Sky. After a short burst of live shows further lineup changes occurred when Vigrass, Doosing, Shade, and Ware departed the band to be replaced by former Solstice vocalist Susan Robinson, drummer David Cairns, and keyboardist Dillon Tonkin.

This stable line-up did hundreds of shows over the next few years culminating in headliners at the Marquee Club in the same months as their contemporaries, Marillion, Pendragon, IQ, Twelfth Night, Solstice and Pallas.

In 1985, David Cairns and Cyrus Khajavi were replaced by Dave Wagstaffe and Kevin Fitzgerald respectively, and this lineup recorded a new track for the EMI compilation album "Fire in Harmony" which reached number 49 in the Kerrang! rock album charts. Not long after "Fire in Harmony"'s release, Fitzgerald, Robinson, and Tonkin were replaced by Uwe D'Rose, Nick Williams and Steve Leigh respectively. After a few months and some of the hardest gigs known to mankind Williams left and Tracy Hitchings took his place.

The band's second album The Loreli was started, but during recording, D'Rose and Leigh left, with the former being replaced by Toshi Tsuchiya. The Loreli was released in 1989 and this took the band further to perform in Europe as well as the UK. Despite this, the band lost several members shortly thereafter, with Wagstaffe joining the previously departed D'Rose and Leigh in forming Landmarq, whom Hitchings would later join.

Quasar moved to California and with some new members, started performing there. New members PJ Shadowhawk (drums/percussion) and Enrico Goias (guitars) joined in 2005. Enrico moved on in 2006 and was replaced by Robert Hunt Robinson (vocals/keyboards), and Greg Studley (guitars). In 2010, Shadowhawk left due to illness and was replaced by Paul Johnson. Studley was replaced by Clancy Ferrill in 2012. Keren Gaiser (vocals/keyboards) joined in 2011 to round out the current lineup.

Quasar released a live 2011 CD while the band's third album was written and recorded and released in April 2017.

Quasar have been back in UK since 2022 and are continuing with live dates and working on a 4th studio album.

== Members ==
=== Current members ===
- Keith Turner – bass, keyboards (1979–present)
- Keren Gaiser – vocals, keyboards (2010–present)
- Robert Hunt Robinson – vocals, keyboards (2006–present)
- Paul Johnson – drums, percussion (2010–present)
- Clancy Ferrill – guitars (2012–present)

=== Former members ===
- Geoff Banks – keyboards (1979–1980)
- John Clark – guitars (1979–1980)
- Steve Clarke – drums (1979–1980)
- Mike Kenwright – vocals (1979–1980)
- Cyrus Khajavi – guitars (1980–1985)
- Steen Doosing – drums (1980–1981)
- Peter Shade – percussion, keyboards (1980–1981)
- Paul Vigrass – vocals (1980–1981)
- Peter Ware – keyboards (1980–1981)
- Susan Robinson – vocals (1981–1985)
- Dillon Tonkin – keyboards (1981–1985)
- David Cairns – drums (1981–1985)
- Dave Wagstaffe – drums (1985–1989)
- Kevin Fitzgerald – guitars (1985)
- Uwe D'Rose – guitars (1985–1989)
- Steve Leigh – keyboards (1985–1989)
- Nick Williams – vocals (1985)
- Tracy Hitchings – vocals (1985–1990)
- Toshi Tsuchiya – guitars (1990)
- PJ Shadowhawk – drums (2005–2010)
- Greg Studley – guitars (2006–2012)

=== Lineups ===
1979–1980	1980–1981	1981–1985	1985
Geoff Banks – keyboards; John Clark – guitars; Steve Clarke – drums; Mike Kenwright – vocals; Keith Turner – bass, keyboards, guitars	Keith Turner – bass, keyboards, guitars; Steen Doosing – drums; Cyrus Khajavi – guitars; Peter Shade – percussion, keyboards; Paul Vigrass – vocals; Peter Ware – keyboards	Keith Turner – bass, keyboards, guitars; Cyrus Khajavi – guitars; David Cairns – drums; Susan Robinson – vocals; Dillon Tonkin – keyboards	Keith Turner – bass, keyboards, guitars; Susan Robinson – vocals; Dillon Tonkin – keyboards; Kevin Fitzgerald – guitars; Dave Wagstaffe – drums
1985	1985–1989	1989–1990	1990–2005
Keith Turner – bass, keyboards, guitars; Dave Wagstaffe – drums; Uwe D'Rose – guitars; Steve Leigh – keyboards; Nick Williams – vocals	Keith Turner – bass, keyboards, guitars; Dave Wagstaffe – drums; Uwe D'Rose – guitars; Steve Leigh – keyboards; Tracy Hitchings – vocals	Keith Turner – bass, keyboards, guitars; Dave Wagstaffe – drums; Tracy Hitchings – vocals; Toshi Tsuchiya – guitars	Keith Turner – bass, keyboards, guitars
2005–2010	2010–present
Keith Turner – bass, keyboards, guitars; Robert Hunt Robinson – vocals, keyboards; PJ Shadowhawk – drums, percussion; Greg Studley – guitars	Keith Turner – bass, keyboards, guitars; Keren Gaiser – vocals, keyboards; Robert Hunt Robinson – vocals, keyboards; Paul Johnson – drums, percussion; Clancy Ferrill – guitars

== Discography ==
=== Studio albums ===
- Fire in the Sky (1982)
- The Loreli (1989)
- Memories of Times Yet to Be (2016)

=== Live albums and compilations ===
- Fire in Harmony (1985)
- Quasar Live 1984–1990 (2011)
- Live 2011 (2012)
