= Dino Ferari =

Italian drummer

Dino Ferari (born Ermanno Ghisio Erba in Rome, Italy) is an Italian drummer who has worked with a number of British bands. He played with former Tyrannosaurus Rex percussionist Steve Peregrin Took's band Steve Took's Horns alongside Trev Thoms on guitar. After The Horns both Thoms and Ferari joined former Hawkwind saxophonist Nik Turner in Inner City Unit.

He has worked with other ex-Hawkwind members including Ron Tree. Ferari has also played with Andy Anderson (The Cure), Gilli Smyth, Didier Malherbe (Gong), Captain Sensible (The Damned) and, in America, Question Mark & the Mysterians. Since the late 1990s Ferari has been working mostly in Italy while occasionally performing with the Inner City Unit in the UK.
