= "Fast" Eddie Clarke =

British guitarist (1950–2018)

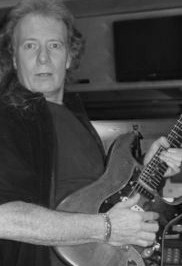
- Clarke in 2009

Background information
- Born: Edward Allan Clarke; 5 October 1950; Twickenham, Middlesex, England
- Died: 10 January 2018 (aged 67) London, England
- Genres: Hard rock; heavy metal; rock and roll
- Occupation: Musician
- Instruments: Guitar; vocals
- Years active: 1973–2018
- Formerly of: Motörhead; Fastway
- Website: fasteddieclarke.com

Edward Allan Clarke (5 October 1950 – 10 January 2018), better known as "Fast" Eddie Clarke or simply "Fast" Eddie, was a British guitarist who was a member of rock bands Fastway and Motörhead. Of Motörhead's classic lineup, which consisted of Lemmy and Phil "Philthy Animal" Taylor, he was the last surviving member at the time of his death.

== Career ==
=== Early days ===
Clarke began playing guitar and, by the time he was fifteen years old, had been through many local bands, one of which was called The Bitter End. Of his "Fast" moniker, Clarke has said "I didn't get the name Fast Eddie because of any sex thing, and it wasn't even because I could play fast. It was just that I could play one note in a solo really fast," referring to his skillful tremolo picking.

He continued playing local gigs until 1973, when he turned professional by joining Curtis Knight's blues prog rock band, Zeus, as lead guitarist. In 1974, the band recorded an album called The Second Coming at Olympic Studios. Clarke wrote the music to Knight's lyrics on a track entitled "The Confession".

Clarke recorded the album Sea of Time with Zeus. Later, with guitarist friend Allan Callan, keyboard player Nicky Hogarth, and drummer Chris Perry, Clarke attended a recorded jam session at Command Studios in Piccadilly. As a result of the tracks from this session, the quartet secured a deal with Anchor Records, and called the band Blue Goose. With a recording contract secured, Clarke, Hogarth and Perry left Zeus to focus on their own project with Callan.

Clarke soon formed another band with Be-Bop Deluxe bassist Charlie Tumahai, vocalist Ann McCluskie and drummer Jim Thompson. Called Continuous Performance, this line up lasted until early 1975, when their demo tracks failed to secure them a record deal and the band split up. Still out to secure a record deal, Clarke then formed a group with Nicky Hogarth from Blue Goose, bass player Tony Cussons and drummer Terry Slater. Their efforts to get a deal were also unsuccessful, and Clarke temporarily gave up the music industry.

=== Motörhead ===
Clarke was working on re-fitting a houseboat, when he met drummer Phil Taylor, who had recently joined Motörhead. However, according to Kilmister's authorized biography, it appears that Clarke was introduced to Lemmy by a receptionist at the rehearsal studio, Gertie, who was romantically involved with Clarke at the time. Not long after, he was playing with them. In the early days Eddie rehearsed with Motörhead, before going on the road, at Snobs Rehearsal Studios, part of a converted brewery on the corner of Kings Road and Lots Road, Chelsea, known as the "Furniture Cave". Motörhead's popularity increased along with their UK chart successes. The threesome (Lemmy, Clarke, Taylor) are considered the classic Motörhead line-up and have the Motörhead, Overkill, Ace of Spades, Bomber, No Sleep 'til Hammersmith and Iron Fist albums plus a string of hit singles to their credit.

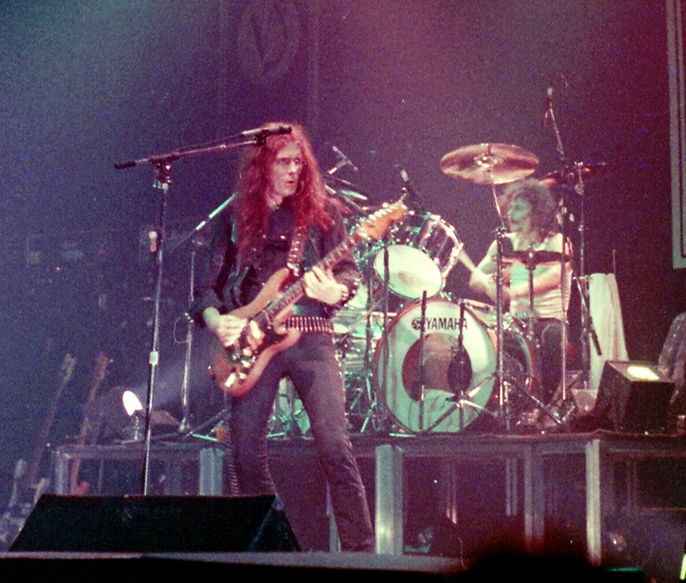
Clarke performing live with Motörhead, 1982

As well as playing guitar and singing backing vocals, he performed lead vocal on a small number of Motörhead songs: Examples are "Beer Drinkers and Hell Raisers" (on which he traded vocals with Lemmy), "I'm Your Witchdoctor" (on which he duets vocals with Lemmy), "Step Down", and "Emergency", one of the B-side tracks on the St. Valentine's Day Massacre EP, upon which they performed "Please Don't Touch", with Girlschool, under the combined band names of Headgirl. He claimed to hate singing lead - see the video for Step Down.

=== Departure from Motörhead ===
Clarke left Motörhead in 1982, whilst on tour of the United States. Becoming unhappy at the results of the Iron Fist album, the recording sessions with the Plasmatics were the final straw. For the B-side of the Stand By Your Man EP the bands took turns in covering each other's songs, Clarke allegedly felt that this compromised the band's principles and resigned. According to Joel McIver, Clarke himself later denied this version of events and had said: "[Philthy] was the main instigator in my being excluded from the band. Notice I do not call it leaving, as it was not my choice. I had imagined dying onstage with Motörhead, so it was a blow when they didn't want me in the band any longer." Clarke was replaced by former Thin Lizzy and Wild Horses lead guitarist Brian Robertson after Anvil frontman Steve "Lips" Kudlow turned down the offer to play with Motörhead. Clarke's last gig with Motörhead took place at the New York Palladium on 14 May 1982. Another cameo from Clarke on a later Motörhead album was on 2000's Live at Brixton Academy, released in 2003, on which the band featured many guest appearances from other guitarists, of which he was one, playing on the songs "No Class", "The Chase Is Better Than the Catch" and "Overkill".

=== Fastway ===
Hearing that UFO bassist Pete Way was keen to leave that band, the two met and decided their new band's name would be an amalgamation of their own two names, resulting in Fastway. They advertised in the music press for a drummer and a vocalist. Meanwhile, a rehearsal was organised, for which Clash drummer Topper Headon filled in on drums. The ads began showing positive results, cassettes from potential band members arrived; one of these was from a young singer named Dave King.

Clarke was impressed with his voice and financed a trip to London for King; after an audition together, King became the Fastway vocalist. Ex-Humble Pie member Jerry Shirley became the drummer. The band sent out demo tapes and were approached by CBS Records for a recording deal. Way announced his departure just as they were about to sign the deal, but CBS had faith in Fastway and decided to sign them despite this setback.

Touring had been strenuous for the band and, upon returning to Britain, they decided to split. Clarke stayed in London, and soon received a call from King about giving Fastway another go. Clarke agreed and moved to Ireland. With another album for CBS in view, they rehearsed with three of King's friends. The record label was happy with the sound and had them record at London's Abbey Road Studios with producer Terry Manning, releasing Waiting for the Roar in 1986. Clarke toured America with Fastway, supporting AC/DC, followed by a lengthy European tour, which produced 1992's Say What You Will – Live album. Fastway were also engaged to provide music for the Trick Or Treat film soundtrack, for which they composed the title track and performed "Heft" and "If You Could See" from their albums.

=== Later days ===
After the band split up again, Clarke moved back to London and met up with Lea Hart, a solo artist in the Far East. Clarke's record deals had now expired, so the pair took a demo tape to Douglas Smith (Clarke's former Motörhead manager) at GWR Records, who willingly signed a deal. Still using the name Fastway, they recorded the On Target album. It featured Don Airey and Paul Airey on keyboards, Neil Murray on bass, plus Bram Tchaikovsky of The Motors and Christine Byford as backing vocalists.

Clarke's group now consisted of Riff Raff on drums, keyboards and bass, plus assorted friends helping out; Biff Byford and Nigel Glockler of Saxon, Don Airey, and Kim McAuliffe and Cris Bonacci of Girlschool. Following the production of two albums, Clarke and Hart split up.

However, the excesses he had indulged in with Motörhead had taken their toll, and led to Clarke being admitted to hospital, spending time afterwards in recuperation. Having recovered, Clarke released a solo album, It Ain't Over Till It's Over, which blends Motörhead and Fastway styles. Lemmy also helped out on the album by writing and singing the track "Laugh at the Devil". The double CD release, Fast Eddie Clarke Anthology, on Sanctuary Records showcased a collection of Clarke's music spanning his career before and after Motörhead. It also marked a return to live performances with a re-formed Fastway, including an appearance in the UK at the Download Festival in summer 2007.

In 2014, Clarke went back to his blues roots and released a new studio album through Secret Records. Make My Day: Back To Blues was a collaboration between Clarke and the keyboardist from Shakatak, Bill Sharpe. Clarke reunited with Lemmy on 6 November 2014 at the National Indoor Arena in Birmingham to play the Motörhead track "Ace of Spades".

=== Death ===
Clarke died on 10 January 2018, aged 67, in a hospital where he was being treated for pneumonia.

== Discography ==
=== Albums ===
- 1974 Curtis Knight Zeus – The Second Coming
- 1974 Curtis Knight Zeus – Sea of Time
- 1983 Fastway – Fastway
- 1984 Fastway – All Fired Up
- 1986 Fastway – Waiting for the Roar
- 1986 Fastway – Trick Or Treat (soundtrack album)
- 1988 Fastway – On Target
- 1990 Fastway – Bad Bad Girls
- 1992 Fastway – Say What You Will – Live
- 1993 The Muggers – The Muggers Tapes
- 1994 Solo album – It Ain't Over Till It's Over
- 2003 Motörhead – Live at Brixton Academy
- 2007 Fast Eddie Clarke Anthology
- 2009 Curtis Knight Zeus -The Second Coming – first time on CD with bonus track.
- 2010 Fastway – Steal The Show – 4 CD Live Box Set.
- 2011 Fastway – Eat Dog Eat
- 2014 Fast Eddie Clarke – Make My Day: Back To Blues – CD & Download
- 2018 Warfare-Cemetery Dirt Download Plastic Head Media Ltd
- 2018 Warfare-Misanthropy from the album Warfare(Nightmare Mixes)

=== Singles ===
- 1974 Curtis Knight and Zeus – "Devil Made Me Do It" / "Oh Rainbow"
- 1974 Curtis Knight and Zeus – "People, Places and Things" / "Mysterious Lady"
- 1983 Fastway – "Easy Livin'" / "Say What You Will"
- 1983 Fastway – "Easy Livin'" / "Say What You Will" / "Far, Far From Home"
- 2018 Warfare - Misanthropy/Cemetery Dirt.

=== Guest appearances ===
- 1990 Motörhead – The Birthday Party (1990) [Album & Video] [Recorded in 1985]
- 1994 JBO – BLASTphemie – on "Greetings from Fast Eddie Clarke"
- 2000 Necropolis – End of the Line – solo on "A Taste For Killing"
- 2001 Motörhead – 25 & Alive Boneshaker (DVD) – live at their 25th anniversary show Brixton, 13 November 2000 – DVD & CD
- 2003 Chinchilla – Madtropolis – solo on "When The Sand Darkens The Sun"
- 2004 Classic Albums: Ace of Spades – Interviewed and plays guitar on this DVD celebrating the 1980 Motörhead album.
- 2005 Masque – Look Out – solo on "I've Had Enough of the Funny Stuff"
- 2008 Sheep in Wolves' Clothing – Motörheadbangers fan club tribute CD – lead guitar on Girlschool's re-mixed version of Motörhead's "Metropolis" song.
- 2008 Girlschool – Legacy – lead guitar on their cover version of Motörhead's "Metropolis" song.
- 2010 Saxon – Heavy Metal Thunder The Movie – Interviewed several times on this DVD.
- 2015 Thor – Metal Avenger – Plays on the title track
- 2017 Evo – Warfare [High Roller Records]

=== Motörhead ===
- Motörhead – 21 August 1977
- Overkill – 24 March 1979
- Bomber – 27 October 1979
- Ace of Spades – 8 November 1980
- No Sleep 'til Hammersmith – 27 June 1981
- Iron Fist – 17 April 1982
- BBC Live & In-Session – 20 September 2005
- The Manticore Tapes – 27 June 2025
