= All Fired Up (Fastway album) =

- Cover art by Chris Moore

Studio album by Fastway
- Released: July 1984
- Studio: Marcus Recording Studios, London, UK
- Genre: Heavy metal, hard rock
- Length: 42:25
- Label: Columbia
- Producer: Eddie Kramer

Fastway chronology
Fastway (1983)	All Fired Up (1984)	Waiting for the Roar (1985)

Singles from All Fired Up
- 1. "All Fired Up" Released: 1984

Professional ratings
Review scores
Source	Rating
AllMusic	3/5 stars
Collector's Guide to Heavy Metal	6/10

All Fired Up is the second studio album by heavy metal band Fastway. It was released in 1984. It is the last album recorded with Jerry Shirley on drums and also with Eddie Kramer as producer.

== Overview ==
In 1984, Fastway recorded again with Eddie Kramer their next album, with the former Taste bassist Charlie McCracken (his only contribution to the band). A music video for the title-track, was released and it soon received distribution through various TV channels like MTV and VH1. The sound of the LP is more blues-based than their previous album and ended up with more melodic elements. All Fired Up had received good reviews, but failed to reach more success due to increasing popularity of glam metal in the charts that same year. To support the album, Fastway opened for Rush on their Grace Under Pressure tour.

After the hardships of touring, Shirley and McCracken left the band in 1985.

== Track listing ==
All song written and composed by Fastway.

Side one
No.	Title	Length
1.	"All Fired Up"	2:43
2.	"Misunderstood"	3:22
3.	"Steal the Show"	3:38
4.	"Station"	2:56
5.	"Non-Stop Love"	3:55
6.	"Hurtin' Me"	4:30

Side two
No.	Title	Length
7.	"Tell Me"	3:50
8.	"Hung Up on Love"	3:27
9.	"The Stranger"	4:11
10.	"Telephone"	4:20
11.	"If You Could See"	4:36

== Personnel ==
Fastway

- "Fast" Eddie Clarke – guitar
- Dave King – lead vocals
- Jerry Shirley – drums
- Charlie McCracken – bass guitar

Production

- Eddie Kramer – producer, engineer, mixing, remixing at the Record Plant, Los Angeles
- Tim Hunt – engineer, mixing at Townhouse Studios, London
- Julian Wheatley – tape operator
- Owen Davies, Ben Kape, Tom Swift, Dave Wittman – assistant engineers
- George Marino – mastering at Sterling Sound, New York
- Jo Mirowski, Torchlight, London – cover design.
- Chris Moore – illustration.
- Allan Ballard – photography.
- Simon Cantwell – art direction.
