= Golborne Road =

Street in Kensal Town, London

Coordinates: 51°31′18″N 0°12′32″W

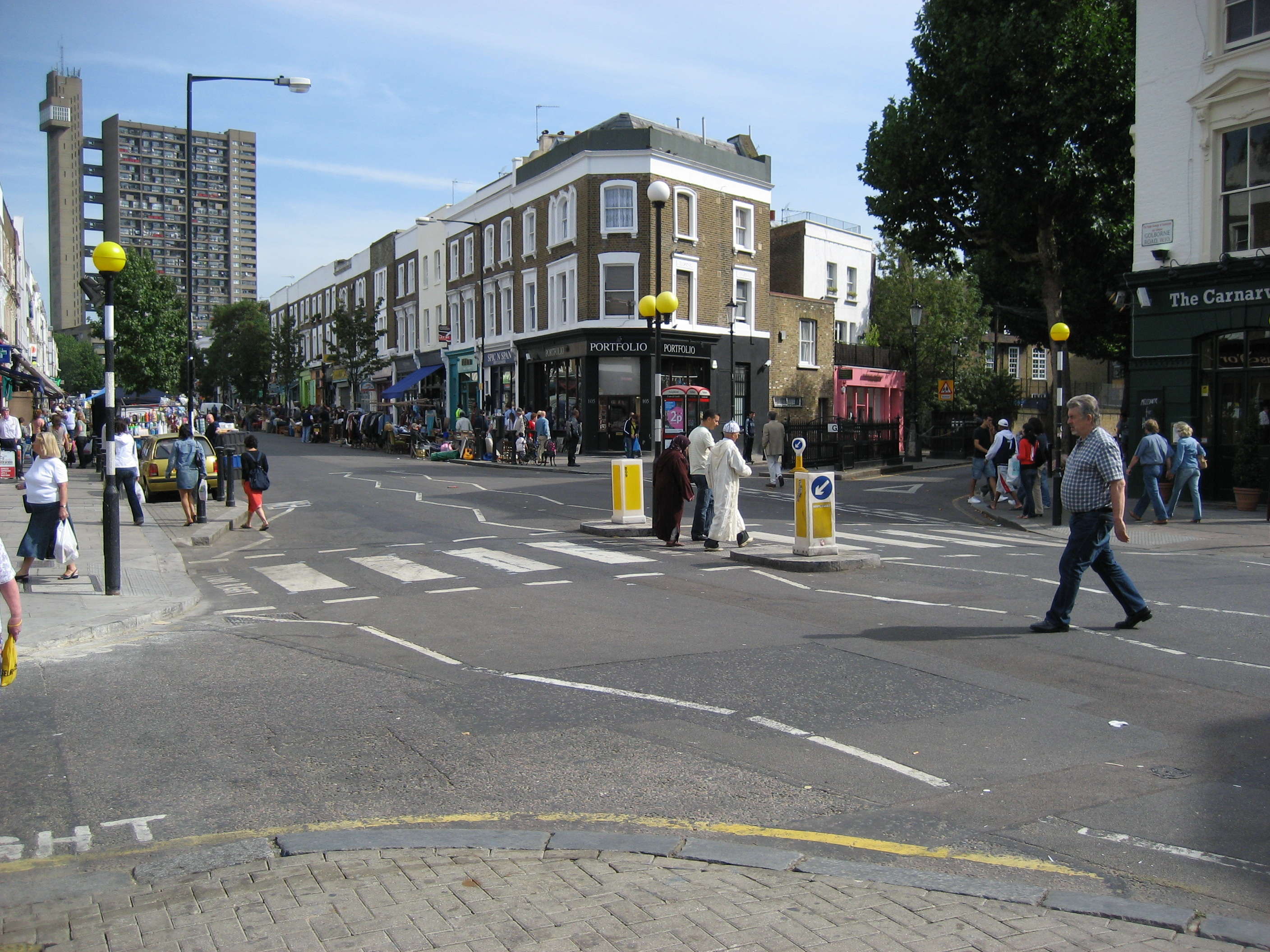
Golborne Road, looking northeast towards Trellick Tower

Golborne Road is a street in the Royal Borough of Kensington and Chelsea in London's Kensal Town. The road runs east from Portobello Road to Kensal Road.

Golborne Road is situated just north of and parallel to the Westway; it also joins Portobello Road. The nearest Underground stations are Westbourne Park and Ladbroke Grove.

It is a major street within the Golborne electoral ward of the local authority, Kensington and Chelsea Borough Council, which also includes the nearby Trellick Tower (pictured) and Grand Union Canal.

== History ==
This area of Notting Hill's northern corner has changed dramatically over its history. The area was part of the Great Forest of Middlesex; in 1543 the land was seized by Henry VIII and by the 18th century Golborne was farmland. Golborne Road was named after Dean Golbourne, at one time vicar of St. John's Church in Paddington. Until the middle of the 19th century, it was no more than a country footpath crossing the fields of Portobello Farm, but in 1870 the road was widened, shops were built and the road was extended over the railway.

Golborne Road was one of the places the Windrush generation settled down in, other ethnic groups followed suit and migrated to the Golborne. It is a street still carrying the richness of black history and an important street to be credited as a part of the black British community.

The Golborne Road area is sometimes known as "Little Morocco" due to the number of Moroccan restaurants and shops selling Maghrebian products located along the road. The road also has renown in the Portuguese community for the two Portuguese pâtisseries at one end, Cafe d'Oporto and Lisboa Patisserie. The junction of Golborne Road and Southam Street was the site of the murder of Antiguan immigrant Kelso Cochrane in 1959, an attack widely viewed as racially motivated. This caused an outrage amongst particularly the black community as racial tensions continued to increase. His killers were never caught. In 2009, a blue plaque was erected at the site of the murder.

Golborne Road hosts a street market every day except Sunday, specialising in produce with hot food and bric-a-brac at the weekend. The Royal Borough of Kensington and Chelsea began a process of consultation on the future of the market and associated amenities in 2005.

== Popular culture ==
Several scenes in Menelik Shabazz's film Burning an Illusion (1981) were filmed on the road, including one in the Grassroots bookshop, which has since closed. It is also prominent in Hanif Kureishi's film London Kills Me (1991).

The restaurant frequented by the characters in the 1999 film Notting Hill is located on the junction of Golborne Road and Bevington Road.

== See also ==
- List of eponymous roads in London
