= Trev Thoms =

British guitarist (1950–2010)

- Also known as: President Putin, Judge, Judge Trev, Judge Trev Thomas
- Born: 30 October 1950; United Kingdom
- Died: 8 December 2010 (aged 60)
- Occupation: Musician
- Member of: Atomgods, Inner City Unit, Iron Maiden, Markheim, Opal Butterfly, Spirits Burning, Steve Gibbons Band, Steve Took's Horns, The Imperial Pompadours Mother Of All Bands,

Trevor Thoms (30 October 1950 – 8 December 2010), known as Judge Trev Thoms and Judge Trev, was a British guitarist, best known for being a member of Inner City Unit, Atomgods, and The Steve Gibbons Band.

== Background ==
In the late 1960s and early 1970s, he played in a blues-rock group with hints of progressive rock and heavy rock called Iron Maiden - not the famous group of the same name - along with Barry Skeels, who later played for Zior and eventually became a tour manager for acts such as Black Sabbath, Saxon, Manowar, and Yngwie Malmsteen (another member of the band was called Steve Drewett, but probably he is not the same person as the one who later founded Newtown Neurotics). They recorded one album called Maiden Voyage.

He later played in the seminal British Blues Boom band, Spirit of John Morgan. He has backed Graham Bond, Gregory Isaacs and Steve Gibbons, and was a member of Steve Peregrin Took's band Steve Took's Horns with Dino Ferari on drums.

Artists he had played with include, Opal Butterfly, Ray Morrison, Count Prince Miller, Gregory Isaacs, Panchito's High Rockers, The Spiders, the Skin-Deep Blues Band and Nik Turner's Fantastic All Stars.

== Career ==
After The Horns broke up in the late 1970s both Thoms and Ferari joined ex-Hawkwind's Nik Turner in Inner City Unit. Thoms also worked with Turner and Twink under the hybrid Pink Fairies/Hawkwind name Pink Wind. He later formed Atomgods and has worked with other ex-Hawkwind members including Ron Tree. He and Ferari formed their own version of Inner City Unit called Judge Trev's Inner City Unit. A regular 'collaborator' he also played with the revived Pinkwind featuring Nik Turner & Twink (ex Pink Fairies) and after moving to Brighton regularly appeared with Slim Tim Slide (Tim Rundall) sometimes under the pseudonym "Stinky & Stumpy", a partnership that continued sporadically for the rest of Thoms' life.

He played festivals such as the Big Green Gathering, Cosmic Puffin Festival, Glastonbury, Earthwise etc., performing his solo acoustic set or with the reformed Inner City Unit with Nik Turner. He also played gigs as Trev and Kev with Kev Ellis, singer from Bubbledubble.

He also ran the website Real Festival Music where he also wrote festival reviews.

Thoms died on 8 December 2010 from pancreatic cancer.

== Later years ==
During the last years of Trev's life he was active in forming The Real Music Club in Brighton and indeed his last ever gig was at a RMC event to celebrate his birthday, and his last recordings were with fellow RMC members Paradise 9. With the aim of promoting local talent as well as providing an outlet for his own work the club continues both live and on Brighton and Hove Community radio www.bhcr.org.uk and annual Trev Memorial gigs are ongoing.
