= Chinchilla (band) =

German band

- Origin: Germany
- Genres: Power metal
- Years active: 1988–present
- Labels: Metal Blade
- Members: Udo Gerstenmeyer; Thomas Laasch; Christian Schwinn; Roberto Palacios
- Past members: Martin Obermeyer; Marc Peters; Steffen Theurer; Marc Steck; Josch Häberle; Arthur Diessner; Ralf Stoney
- Website: http://www.chinchilla.rocks.de

Chinchilla is a heavy metal band from Germany. The group was founded by guitarist Udo Gerstenmeyer in 1988, and released an EP entitled No Mercy in 1990. This incarnation of the band broke up just after the release of the album, but Gerstenmeyer reformed the band in 1994 and recorded a second EP. A full-length did not appear until 1998, after which the group signed to Metal Blade Records, for whom they would release several albums. Several line-up changes have occurred over the life of the band.

== Discography ==
- No Mercy EP (1990)
- Who Is Who EP (1994)
- Horrorscope (1998)
- Madness (Metal Blade, 2001)
- 2000 Years at the War (Metal Blade, 2002)
- The Last Millennium (Metal Blade, 2002)
- Madtropolis (Metal Blade, 2003)
- Take No Prisoners (Armageddon Records, 2004)

== Members ==
=== Current members ===
- Udo Gerstenmeyer : Guitar, Keyboard
- Thomas Laasch : Vocals (2000 – present)
- Christian Schwinn : Drums (2003 – present)
- Roberto Palacios : Bass (2004 – present)

=== Former Members ===
- Martin Obermeyer : Vocals (? – 1998)
- Marc Peters : Bass (? – 2002)
- Steffen Theurer : Drums (? – 2002)
- Marc Steck : Keyboard (2002)
- Josch Häberle : Bass (2003)
- Arthur Diessner : Keyboards (2003)
- Ralf Stoney : Guitar (2007–2008)
