= On Target =

Studio album by Fastway
- Released: 1988
- Studio: Chapel Recording Studios, Swaby, Lincolnshire, UK
- Genre: Hard rock, heavy metal
- Length: 44:23
- Label: GWR, Enigma
- Producer: Eddie Clarke, Lea Hart

Fastway chronology
Trick or Treat (1986)	On Target (1988)	Bad Bad Girls (1990)

Singles from On Target
- 1. "A Fine Line" / "Change of Heart" Released: 1988; 2. "Dead or Alive" / "Let Him Rock" Released: 1988

On Target is the fifth studio album by British rock band Fastway, and their first album without original frontman Dave King.

Professional ratings
Review scores
Source	Rating
AllMusic	1.5/5 stars
Collector's Guide to Heavy Metal	0/10

== Track listing ==
No.	Title	Writer(s)	Length
1.	"Dead or Alive"	Lea Hart, Ray Callcut	3:52
2.	"Change of Heart"	Christopher O'Shaughnessy, Eddie Clarke, Hart	3:41
3.	"A Fine Line"	Terry Thomas	4:55
4.	"Two Hearts"	O'Shaughnessy, Clarke, Hart	4:02
5.	"You"	Les White, Thomas	3:32
6.	"Let Him Rock"	O'Shaughnessy, Clarke, Hart	4:34
7.	"She Is Danger"	Clarke, Hart	5:12
8.	"Show Some Emotion"	Bernie Marsden, Brian Badhams, Don Airey, Robert Hawthorn	5:05
9.	"These Dreams"	O'Shaughnessy, Clarke, Hart	4:19
10.	"Close Your Eyes"	White, Thomas	4:11

== Personnel ==
Fastway

- Eddie Clarke – guitars, backing vocals
- Lea Hart – lead vocals and guitars

Additional musicians

- Neil Murray - bass
- Tim 'Nibbs' Carter - bass, backing vocals
- Terry Thomas - bass synths, backing vocals, arrangements with Fastway
- Gary Ferguson - drums
- Don Airey, Paul Airey - keyboards
- Tim Cutting, Bram Tchaikovsky - backing vocals
- Christopher O'Shaughnessy - backing vocals, pre-production, arrangements with Fastway
- Christine Byford - female vocals on "She Is Danger"

Production

- Matt Kemp - engineer
- Vernon Austin - mixing
