= Fastway (album) =

Studio album by Fastway
- Released: April 1983
- Studios: Marcus Music and Maison Rouge Studios, London, UK
- Genres: Hard rock; heavy metal
- Length: 41:58
- Label: Columbia
- Producer: Eddie Kramer

Fastway chronology
Fastway (1983)	All Fired Up (1984)

Singles from Fastway
- 1. "We Become One" Released: 1983; 2. "Say What You Will" Released: 1983; 3. "Easy Livin'" Released: 1983

Professional ratings
Review scores
Source	Rating
AllMusic	2.5/5 stars
Collector's Guide to Heavy Metal	10/10

Fastway is the debut studio album by British rock band Fastway, released in April 1983.

Founding member Pete Way (ex-bass guitar player with UFO) did not play on the album, because by the time the recording sessions began Way left the band. He soon formed another band, Waysted. The bass guitar parts on the album were actually played by Ralph Benitez.

The album has been reissued as a two-fer with the second Fastway album, All Fired Up; however, that edition omits the song "Far Far from Home", bonus track featured on the standalone CD release of the first album.

UK-based record label Rock Candy Records has since re-issued the album with additional liner notes and bonus tracks, including B-sides and BBC sessions.

== Track listing ==
All tracks composed by Fastway

Side one
No.	Title	Length
1.	"Easy Livin'"	2:47
2.	"Feel Me, Touch Me (Do Anything You Want)"	3:27
3.	"All I Need Is Your Love"	2:32
4.	"Another Day"	4:41
5.	"Heft!"	5:38

Side two
No.	Title	Length
6.	"We Become One"	3:59
7.	"Give It All You Got"	3:01
8.	"Say What You Will"	3:20
9.	"You Got Me Runnin'"	3:04
10.	"Give It Some Action"	4:11
11.	"Far Far from Home"	5:29

- Originally, "Far Far from Home" was a separate promotional single, included in the first vinyl LP pressings. It was not on the original cassette versions, and not included in subsequent LP editions, but is included as a track on the compact disc edition.

== Personnel ==
=== Fastway ===
- "Fast" Eddie Clarke – guitar
- Dave King – vocals, harmonica
- Jerry Shirley – drums

=== Additional musicians ===
- Mickey Feat – bass guitar (uncredited)

=== Production ===
- Eddie Kramer – producer, engineer, arrangements with Fastway
- Alan Douglas, Tim Hunt – engineers
- Howard Gray – assistant engineer

== Charts ==
Chart (1983)	Peak position
Canada Top Albums/CDs (RPM)	70
UK Albums (Official Charts)	43
US Billboard 200	31
