= Fastway (band) =

English hard rock band

Background information
- Origin: London, England
- Genres: Hard rock; heavy metal
- Works: View discography section
- Years active: 1982–1991; 1998; 2007–2018
- Labels: Columbia; Enigma; SPV; Steamhammer
- Spinoff of: Motörhead; UFO
- Past members: "Fast" Eddie Clarke; Pete Way; Dave King; Jerry Shirley; Lea Hart; Richard McCracken; Bryan Eling; Steve Clarke; John McManus; Steve Strange; Toby Jepson; Matt Eldridge

Fastway were an English hard rock band formed in 1982 by former Motörhead guitarist "Fast" Eddie Clarke and former UFO bassist Pete Way. The band went through various membership changes and Way left the band after receiving an opportunity to perform with Ozzy Osbourne.

== Career ==
In 1982, guitarist "Fast" Eddie Clarke of Motörhead and bassist Pete Way of UFO joined to create a new band for CBS Records. They recruited Humble Pie drummer Jerry Shirley, and the then-unknown vocalist Dave King. The band was named from a combination of their names. However, Way discovered that he could not break his recording contract with Chrysalis Records and then received an offer to play for Ozzy Osbourne; he left the band and did not record any songs. The band then brought in session bassist Mickey Feat and recorded its debut album Fastway (1983) (Feat was uncredited on the album).

After critical and commercial success, the band toured to promote the album (with one-time Fixx bassist Alfie Agius as their session bass player). The band then recruited Richard McCracken, formerly of Taste, as "permanent" bassist, and released another success in the form of All Fired Up the following year. After the hardships of touring, Shirley and McCracken subsequently left.

In 1985, Clarke and King reformed Fastway with a new line-up. Recruiting Shane Carroll (second guitar), Paul Reid (bass), and Alan Connor (drums) from Dave King's first band, Stillwood, this line-up released Waiting for the Roar. The record took an album-oriented rock approach instead of the driving bluesy-metal of the previous albums. The record's success was limited, and it disappointed many fans. The same year, Fastway was approached to make the soundtrack for the heavy metal horror film Trick or Treat. The film flopped, but the soundtrack re-established Fastway as a hard-hitting metal band. The soundtrack was a moderate success and stayed on the Billboard Top 200 chart for eleven months. The success of the soundtrack, combined with the little money the band received, caused infighting, and the group disbanded. King took most of the band with him and started Q.E.D., a more AOR-styled outfit. They released a two-track single.

Meanwhile, Clarke decided to restart Fastway from scratch in 1988, using vocalist Lea Hart and session men, and quickly released On Target that same year, but it sold poorly.

In 1990, this duo of Clarke and Hart released Bad Bad Girls, employing various session musicians including members of Girlschool. It was widely ignored and sold poorly. After calling it a day in 1991, they released a perfunctory live album Say What You Will LIVE (an older recording with King on vocals). In 1998, Clarke and Hart reunited and released a reworked version of On Target, but there was no commercial success.

On 25 May 2007, Toby Jepson, former lead singer with Little Angels, announced he had accepted an approach from Fastway to perform lead vocal duties during the year's festival appearances. An updated line-up played the Sweden Rock Festival, Japanese Hard Rock Hell, and the Download Festival at Castle Donington. Besides guitarist Clarke and Jepson, the new band featured drummer Steve Strange (not to be confused with Visage singer Steve Strange) and bass player John McManus (Mama's Boys).

In an interview with Komodo Rock at the Hard Rock Hell Festival in November 2007, Clark confirmed that he and Jepson would be working on new material. He said "Toby and I are going to sit down and maybe do a few tunes over the winter. See if we can write some tunes". In 2008, Jepson announced he was to go on and front the Scottish hard rockers Gun full-time.

In late 2010, Clarke returned to the recording studio to record a new, and what turned out to be the final Fastway album with Jepson, titled Eat Dog Eat. The album was released on 14 November 2011 by SPV/Steamhammer, the first album of entirely new material from Fastway in over 20 years.

Clarke died on 10 January 2018 after a battle with pneumonia at the age of 67. No official statement about the disbandment or the future of Fastway was made following his death, but the band was mostly inactive by then. Two years and seven months later, Way died on 14 August 2020.

== Band members ==
Lead and rhythm guitar

- "Fast" Eddie Clarke (1982–1991, 1998, 2007–2011, died 2018)

Vocals

- Dave King – lead vocals (1982–1986)
- Lea Hart – also rhythm guitar & bass (1988–1991, 1998)
- Toby Jepson – also rhythm guitar & bass (2007–2011)

Bass

- Pete Way (1982; died 2020)
- Alfie Agius (1983 – official touring member)
- Richard "Charlie" McCracken – bass (1983–1984, 1991)
- Paul Reid – bass (1985–1986)
- John McManus – bass (2007–2010)

Drums

- Jerry Shirley (1982–1984, 1991)
- Alan Connor (1985–1986)
- Steve Clarke (1987–1989)
- Steve Strange (2007–2010; died 2021)

Keyboards and rhythm guitar

- Shane Carrol (1985–1986)

=== Session musicians ===
Rhythm guitar

- Kim MacAllifie (1990)
- Chris Bonacci (1990)
- Terry Thomas (1998)

Bass

- Mickey Feet (1983)
- Neil Murray (1988)
- Nibbs Carter (1998)

Drums

- Gary Ferguson (1998)
- Matt Eldridge (2011)

Keyboards

- Don Airey (1998)
- Paul Airey (1998)

== Discography ==
=== Studio albums ===
- Fastway (1983, CBS) – US No. 31
- All Fired Up (1984, CBS)
- Waiting for the Roar (1986, CBS)
- Trick or Treat (1986, CBS)
- On Target (1988, GWR Records)
- Bad Bad Girls (1990, Legacy Records)
- Eat Dog Eat (2011, Steamhammer)

=== Singles and EPs ===
- "We Become One" (1983)
- "Say What You Will" (1983)
- "Easy Livin'" (1983)
- "All Fired Up" (1984)
- "Tell Me" (1984)
- "The Stranger" (1984)
- "The World Waits for You" (1986)
- "A Fine Line" (1988)
- "I've Had Enough" (1990)
- "Bad Bad Girls" (1990)
