= Escalation =

Escalation is the process of increasing or rising, derived from the concept of an escalator. Specific uses of the term include:

- Cost escalation, an increase in the price of goods
- Conflict escalation, an increase in the intensity of a conflict
- Escalation hypothesis, a theory in evolutionary biology
- Escalation of commitment, an aspect of game theory
- Privilege escalation, a computer security process
- Technological escalation, a technological version of an arms race

== Entertainment ==
- Escalation (1968 Italian film), a 1968 Italian film
- Escalation (1968 American film), a 1968 anti-Vietnam War animated cartoon, directed by Ward Kimball
- Escalation Studios, an American video game developer
- Escalate (album), 2025 album by Vlure
- "Escalate" (song), 2023 song by Aimer
- Escalation (Valorant), a "Gun Game"-style video game mode
- "Escalation", a song by Kreator from Hordes of Chaos

== See also ==
- De-escalation, an attempt to quell conflict
- Escalator (disambiguation)
