= Escalator (disambiguation) =

An escalator is a moving staircase which carries people between floors of a building or structure.

Escalator may also refer to:

- Escalator (album), 1969 album by Sam Gopal
- "Escalator", a song by Sam Gopal from the eponymous album
- "Escalator", a song by Itsy from EP Born to Be
- "Escalator", a song by Melanie C from album Version of Me
- "Escalator", a song by Sparks from album The Girl Is Crying in Her Latte

== See also ==
- Escalation (disambiguation)
