= Barb Wire Dolls =

Punk rock band from Greece

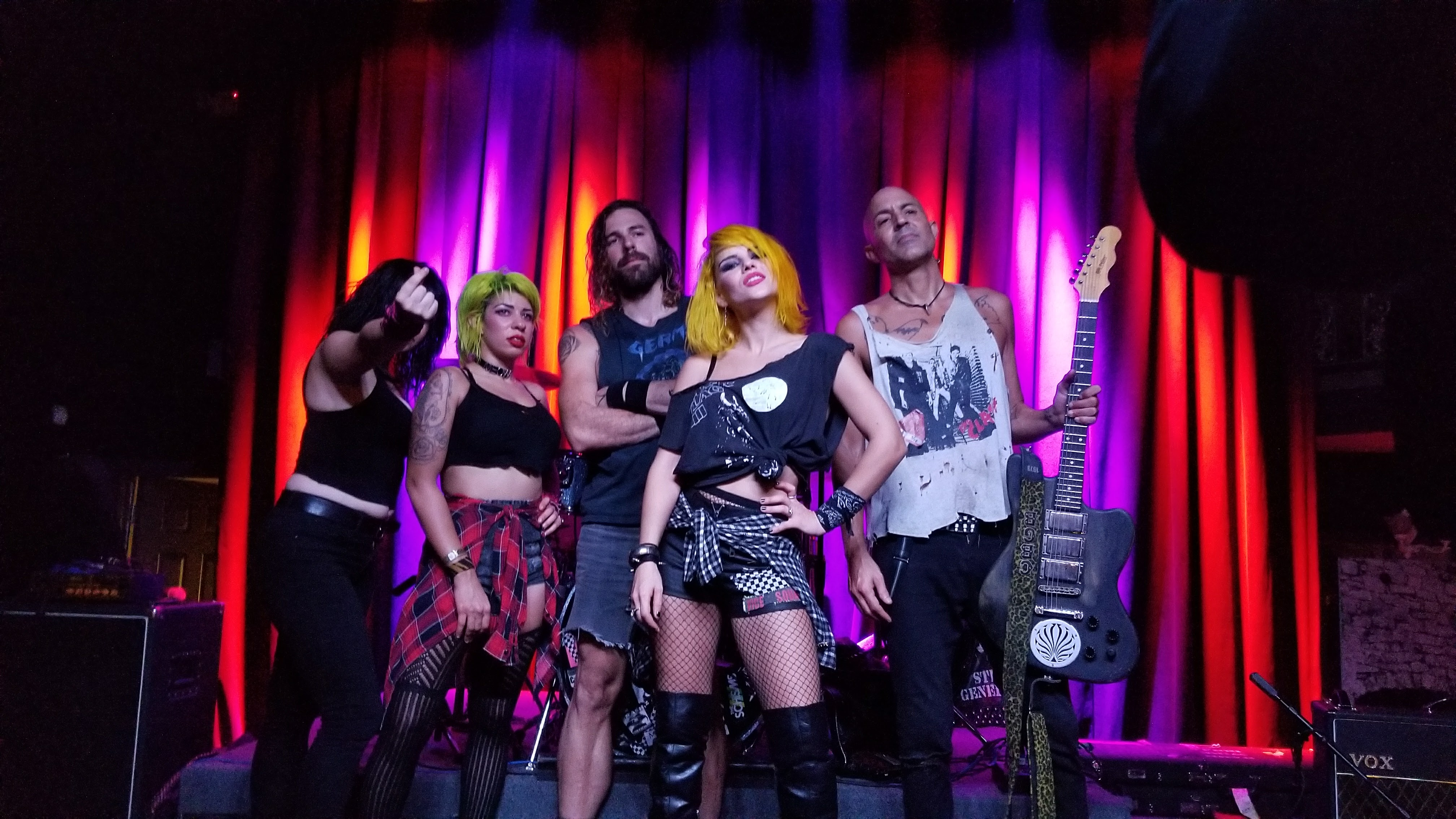

Background information
- Origin: Crete, Greece
- Genre: Grunge / Punk rock / Glam metal
- Years active: 2010–present
- Label: Motörhead Music
- Members: IQueen; Pyn Doll; JJ Doll; Krash Doll
- Website: www.barbwiredolls.com

The Barb Wire Dolls are a grunge/punk rock band from Greece, based in the United States. They were championed by Lemmy on whose personal record label (a subsidiary of Warner Music Group) their third and fourth albums were released.

== History ==
The band formed in Crete, Greece in 2008 with the members IQueen and Pyn Doll while living in the Ikarus Artist Commune in Avdou. The lineup later consisted of IQueen on vocals, lead guitarist Pyn Doll (also the band's professional skateboarder and surfer), rhythm guitarist Xtine, bassist Iriel Blaque, and drummer Krash Doll. The group's debut EP, Punk the Fussies!, was self-released in 2010.

After playing many times in Greece, including several festivals, the band came to the attention of KROQ radio host Rodney Bingenheimer and relocated temporarily to Los Angeles, California in December 2010, where they played a sold out U.S. debut show at The Roxy Theatre on the Sunset Strip. The band also played residencies at The Whisky a Go Go (March, July/August 2015, May 2016, March 2017), The Viper Room, On The Rox, and the Doll Hut. In 2011 they were spotted by Tom Zutaut, whom they worked with for a period of six months. After self-releasing the album consisting of 2 EP's Fuck the Pussies in 2011, the band first released the Steve Albini-engineered album Slit on CD and on vinyl LP in 2012 with distributor Darla Records. The recording of the album was funded via Kickstarter.

The band toured throughout 2012 and half of 2013 in the U.S. playing over 300 shows including headlining the festivals Texas Showdown, Ink Life, Brincadeira, and Rock4Unity. In May 2013 the band started their first European tour to promote Slit. The band released Slit in 2013 on Wolverine Records in Europe as limited Vinyl LP and CD. The band headlined festivals in twelve European countries including the UK's BBA Taking Control, Germany's Kreutziger Streetfest, Pirate Satellite, Weihnachtspogo, Sommerloch, France's Foud'Rock, Slovenia's Gala Hala, Serbia's To Be Punk, Greece's Nakas and Ikarus, Czech Republic's Keltska Noc & Vine City, and Slovakia's Happy Punk festival. In 2015 and 2016, Barb Wire Dolls headlined the annual Joey Ramone Birthday Bash in New York City. Past headliners include Green Day, New York Dolls, Blondie, Cheap Trick, The Damned and Joan Jett.

In addition the band has played on the main stages at Wacken Open Air, Riot Fest, Vans Warped Tour, Rebellion, Mighty Sounds, Fest Pod Parou, Total Bochum, and Back To Future music festivals. Barb Wire Dolls have played over nine hundred shows selling out multiple club dates in over twenty five countries including co-headlining dates with GBH, Sham 69, Discharge, The Ataris, Cockney Rejects, Status Quo, 999, The Murder Junkies, Candlebox, Mushroomhead and played direct support for Jello Biafra, NOFX, Descendents, Steel Panther, and Bouncing Souls. Barb Wire Dolls performances have attracted members of the Sex Pistols, Motörhead, Black Flag, Ramones, Guns 'N' Roses, L7, Dead Kennedys, Aerosmith, Turbonegro, Iggy and the Stooges, Bad Religion, Dead Boys, Blondie, Circle Jerks, UK Subs, Flogging Molly, Sonic Youth, The Cult, Fear, The Casualties, Television, Die Toten Hosen, T.S.O.L., Bob Gruen, Kreator, and Frances Bean Cobain.

In 2015 after seeing the band live at the Whisky a Go Go in Los Angeles, Lemmy Kilmister of Motörhead offered the band a record deal and the band signed with his record label Motörhead Music. As members of Motörhead Music, Barb Wire Dolls are represented by Lemmy’s long-time manager Todd Singerman, Motörhead's booking agents, and parent label UDR/Warner Music Group. The new studio album Desperate was released on July 22, 2016 and entered the iTunes New Rock Releases at number 43 and charted in the top 25 on the CMJ U.S. radio charts. Recorded at Sonic Ranch (Yeah Yeah Yeahs, Ministry, Gogol Bordello) and NRG Recording Studios (Motörhead, Foo Fighters, No Doubt), Desperate was produced and mixed by award-winning producer Jay Baumgardner (Bush, Evanescence, Lacuna Coil) and mastered by Grammy award-winning mastering engineer Howie Weinberg (Nirvana's Nevermind, Red Hot Chili Peppers' Blood Sugar Sex Magik, U2's Pop).

In 2016 and 2017 the band continued to tour both in Europe and in the United States, also performing all summer long on the Vans Warped Tour. In 2017 the day after the Vans Warped Tour finished, the band released their third official studio album Rub My Mind on CD, LP and Digital via Motörhead Music/Silver Lining Music/Warner Music Group to high acclaim. The top critics choice album saw two music videos released: for "Back In The USSA" and "Fade Away". On November 25, 2017 the band ended a fifty-city North American headline tour with another sold out show at the Whisky a Go Go in Los Angeles.

== Musical style ==
The band has been described as "essentially a fiery, raging punk band with hints of ‘80s metal and thrash flourishes" and have been compared to bands such as L7.

== Band members ==
- Isis Queen - vocals
- Pyn Doll - lead guitar
- Remmington - rhythm guitar
- Iriel Blaque - bass guitar
- Krash Doll - drums

== Discography ==
=== Albums ===
- Fuck the Pussies (2011), Barb Wire sex
- Slit (2012), Darla
- Desperate (2016), Motörhead Music
- Rub My Mind (2017), Motörhead Music

=== EPs ===
- Punk the Fussies! (2010)

=== Split singles ===
- OFF!/Barb Wire Dolls – veri.live Issue 12 (2013) (Vinyl, 7", Random Mixed Colour) - came with veri.live magazine, and included the track "Walking Dead"
- Barb Wire Dolls / Rather Raccoon - Split 7inch (2013) (Vinyl, 7", available on 5 different colours via True Trash Records) - included the track "Revolution"
- Barb Wire Dolls - 7inch (2013) (Vinyl, 7", available via Ghost Highway Recordings) - included the tracks "Devil's Full Moon" and a live recording from France for the track "World On Fire"
- Barb Wire Dolls / Bad Cop/Bad Cop - Split 7inch (2016) (Vinyl, 7", available via Voodoo Donut Recordings) - included the track "Surreal"
