= Silver Machine =

1972 song by Hawkwind

Single by Hawkwind
- B-side: "Seven By Seven"
- Released: 9 June 1972
- Recorded: 13 February 1972
- Genre: Space rock
- Length: 4:39
- Label: United Artists
- Songwriters: R.Calvert, Sylvia McManus
- Producer: Dr Technical

Hawkwind singles chronology
"Hurry on Sundown" (1970)	"Silver Machine" (1972)	"Urban Guerrilla" (1973)

Official audio
- "Silver Machine" on YouTube

"Silver Machine" is a 1972 song by the UK rock group Hawkwind. It was originally released as a single on 9 June 1972, reaching number three on the UK singles chart. The single was re-issued in 1976, again in 1978 reaching number 34 on the UK singles charts, and once again in 1983 reaching number 67 on the UK singles charts. The original mix has been re-released on the remasters version of In Search of Space.

== The single ==
Hawkwind – "Silver Machine"
28 seconds (of 4:39)

"Silver Machine" was recorded live at a Greasy Truckers benefit gig at The Roundhouse, London on 13 February 1972 and this version was released on the various artists compilation album Glastonbury Fayre and the 2007 box set of Greasy Truckers Party. Overdubs were applied and mixing took place at Morgan Studios with Douglas Smith and Dave Robinson overseeing the process. Dave Brock took production credits using an alias of Dr Technical. The sleeve was designed by Barney Bubbles (uncredited). Stacia appears prominently in the music video.

=== Personnel ===
- Robert Calvert – vocals
- Dave Brock – guitar, vocals
- Nik Turner – saxophone, flute, vocals
- Lemmy Kilmister – bass guitar, lead vocals
- Dik Mik (Michael Davies) – Synthesizer
- Del Dettmar – Synthesizer
- Simon King – drums

=== Music ===
The writing credit on the single is Robert Calvert and Sylvia MacManus. MacManus was Dave Brock’s then-wife Sylvia, whose name Brock used in order to put pressure on his publishing company to improve his deal. The verse is an eight-bar rock and roll boogie whose riff is an adaption of the standard riff that can be heard on the likes of Johnny and the Hurricanes' "Red River Rock" (sample).

[The Greasy Truckers] was about my third gig, and I didn't know what I was doing. I hadn't done any rehearsals and I thought that Silver Machine was a Chuck Berry number – really. – Simon King

=== Vocals and lyrics ===
The lyrics were written by Robert Calvert and he sang the lead vocal on the original live recording. However, the vocals were considered too weak (sample) for the single release so they were re-recorded in the studio. Calvert, who suffered from bi-polar disorder, had been sectioned at the time so was unavailable to attempt another version, and the lead vocals were eventually recorded by Lemmy:

[Calvert's] vocal was fucking hopeless, but he never realised it. That's how mad he was. It sounded like Captain Kirk reading 'Blowing in the Wind'. They tried everybody singing it except me. Then, as a last shot, Douglas said, 'Try Lemmy'. And I did it in one take or two.

Lemmy just had the best voice for it. Of course, Bob was not pleased when he found out. – Douglas Smith

The lyrics are a send-up of space travel, inspired by the Alfred Jarry essay How to Construct a Time Machine which Calvert interpreted as a description of how to build a bicycle:

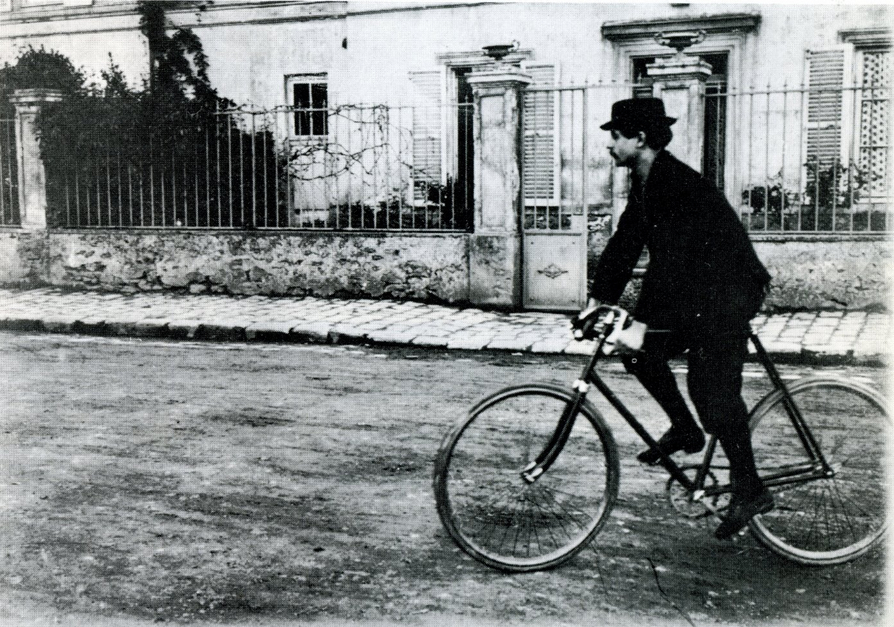
Jarry in Alfortville

I read this essay by Alfred Jarrey [sic] called, "How to Construct a Time Machine", and I noticed something which I don't think anyone else has thought of because I've never seen any criticism of the piece to suggest this. I seemed to suss out immediately that what he was describing was his bicycle. He did have that turn of mind. He was the kind of bloke who'd think it was a good joke to write this very informed sounding piece, full of really good physics (and it has got some proper physics in it), describing how to build a time machine, which is actually about how to build a bicycle, buried under this smoke-screen of physics that sounds authentic. Jarrey got into doing this thing called 'Petaphysics' [sic], which is a sort of French joke science. A lot of notable French intellectuals formed an academy around the basic idea of coming up with theories to explain the exceptions to the Laws of the Universe, people like Ionesco the playwright. The College of Metaphysics. I thought it was a great idea for a song. At that time there were a lot of songs about space travel, and it was the time when NASA was actually, really doing it. They'd put a man on the moon and were planning to put parking lots and hamburger stalls and everything up there. I thought that it was about time to come up with a song that actually sent this all up, which was 'Silver Machine'. 'Silver Machine' was just to say, I've got a silver bicycle, and nobody got it. I didn't think they would. I thought that what they would think we were singing about some sort of cosmic space travel machine. I did actually have a silver racing bike when I was a boy. I've got one now, in fact. – Robert Calvert

=== Top of the Pops ===
Hawkwind have very rarely appeared on television, but the success of the single necessitated an appearance on the BBC chart show Top of the Pops. However, the group felt ill at ease at the prospect of miming a performance in front of a studio audience who didn't represent their following, so a compromise was reached with the BBC recording the band performing live at Dunstable Civic Hall on 7 July 1972, this clip being shown with the single version dubbed over it.

=== Discography ===
Year	Single format	Silver Machine	Seven By Seven	Notes
1972	7-inch	Original mix – 45UP35381 A-1U	Original mix – 45UP35381 B-1U	Winged monkey in clockwork sleeve
1976	7-inch	Roadhawks version – UP35381	Remix – UP35381 (available on Stasis)	
1978	7-inch	Roadhawks version – UP35381 A-4	Space Ritual version – UP35381 B-4	Black Doremi shield on white background
1978	12-inch	Original mix – 12UP35381 A-1U	Remix – 12UP35381 B-2U	Silver foil sleeve with embossed Doremi shield
1983	7-inch	Roadhawks version – UP35381	Space Ritual version – UP35381	White Doremi shield on black background
1983	7-inch pic disc	Roadhawks version – UP35381 A-4	Space Ritual version – UP35381 B-4	White Doremi shield on black background
1983	12-inch	Original mix – 12UP35381 A-1-1	Remix – 12UP35381 B-1-1	White Doremi shield on black background

=== Chart performance ===
==== Weekly charts ====
Chart (1972–1973)	Peak position
Australia (Kent Music Report)	81
Austria (Ö3 Austria Top 40)	9
Belgium (Ultratop 50 Wallonia)	43
Germany (GfK)	6
Ireland (IRMA)	17
Netherlands (Dutch Top 40)	15
Netherlands (Single Top 100)	14
Switzerland (Schweizer Hitparade)	1
UK Singles (OCC)	3

Chart (1978)	Peak position
UK Singles (OCC)	34

Chart (1983)	Peak position
UK Singles (OCC)	86

==== Year-end charts ====
Chart (1972)	Position
Switzerland (Schweizer Hitparade)	8
UK Singles	29

== Other versions ==
=== BBC sessions ===
A version was recorded at Maida Vale Studios, London on 2 August 1972 for broadcast on the Johnnie Walker show on the 14th, "Brainstorm" also being part of the session. These two recordings have subsequently been included on the 2010 EMI release Hawkwind: At the BBC – 1972. The song was also recorded live at the Paris Theatre, London on 28 September 1972 as part of the hour-long In Concert series broadcast. This full concert was released in mono in 1991 as BBC Radio 1 Live in Concert, and in mono and stereo in 2010 as Hawkwind: At the BBC – 1972.

On 3 December 2007, Cleopatra Records in the US issued a limited edition of 500 10-inch vinyl EPs consisting of both BBC versions of "Silver Machine", the live version as the A-side and the session version as the B-side.

On 14 November 2019, the group recorded a session for Marc Riley's BBC Radio 6 Music show, playing "65 Million Years Ago", "Last Man on Earth", "Spirit of the Age" and "Silver Machine".

=== Live versions ===
The song has sporadically been played live by the band. Its first re-appearance is on the 1980 live album Live Seventy Nine, but it explodes after a minute and is suffixed with "(requiem)" in Brock's attempt at laying the song to rest, sick of having to play their "hit single". Further live versions have been released, most notably a version on the 2002 live album Canterbury Fayre 2001 with vocals by Arthur Brown.

Lemmy continued to make guests appearances with the band when their paths crossed. Some live versions of the song on which Lemmy appeared include The Friday Rock Show Sessions from the Reading Festival 24 August 1986 and Motörhead's Stone Deaf Forever! boxset from Wembley Arena 19 October 2002.

=== 10th anniversary ===
"Silver Machine"

Single by Hawkwind

from the album Choose Your Masques
- B-side: "Psychedelic Warlords"
- Released: 27 August 1982
- Recorded: mid-1982
- Studio: Rockfield Studios
- Genre: Space rock
- Label: RCA/Active
- Songwriters: R.Calvert, Sylvia MacManus
- Producers: Pat Moran, Hawkwind

Hawkwind singles chronology
"Angels of Death" (1981)	"Silver Machine" (1982)	"Night of the Hawk" (1984)

In 1982, the band recorded a new studio version of the song which received general release on 7-inch record and 7-inch picture disk by RCA/Active (RCA267, 27 August 1982). The B-side was a 33 RPM extended play featuring the full 7:25 version and a new version of "Psychedelic Warlords" with a Huw Lloyd-Langton vocal.

Receiving criticism over the release, Brock defended their actions: "It was only done as a tenth anniversary thing, and wasn't supposed to come out just as a picture disc. That was RCA's decision, and I didn't like it one bit. The only reason we cut it was as a special souvenir."

In addition to the single release, the record company included it on the Choose Your Masques album, leaving Marion Lloyd-Langton to complain: "[Huw and I] actually had three tracks for the Masques album, but RCA insisted that Silver Machine went on, so the third track was dropped; pity about that."

=== Remixes ===
- Utah Saints version for the 1996 album Future Reconstructions - Ritual of the Solstice.
- Jimi Cauty version for a single and the 1999 album Epocheclipse – 30 Year Anthology.
- Richard Chadwick version for the album The Hawkwind Remix Project.
- Dave Brock version for the 2006 album Take Me to Your Future.

=== Cover versions ===
- William Shatner featuring Carmine Appice on drums and Wayne Kramer on guitar covered it on 2011's Seeking Major Tom.
- Canadian metal band Voivod released a cover of the song in 2017.

== Uses ==
Joel Veitch has used it for his Stephen Hawkwind sketch on his Rather Good Videos Channel 4 show.

The song has been used for two different UK television advertising campaigns: Mazda cars in 2000 and Red Square alcopops in 2004 (preview).
