= Walk the Walk...Talk the Talk =

Studio album by The Head Cat
- Released: July 5, 2011
- Recorded: Sage and Sound Studios, June 2010 Hollywood, California
- Genre: Rockabilly; rock and roll
- Length: 27:36
- Label: Niji Entertainment Group
- Producer: Cameron Webb

The Head Cat chronology
Fool's Paradise (2006)	Walk the Walk...Talk the Talk (2011)

Professional ratings
Review scores
Source	Rating
Allmusic	3.5/5 stars

Walk the Walk...Talk the Talk is a 2011 album recorded by The Head Cat.

The disc contains notes cover of rockabilly artists of the past but also two completely new songs, "American Beat" and "The Eagle Flies on Friday". It was recorded in four days, in June 2010 in Hollywood.

== Track listing ==
No.	Title	Writer(s)	Original artist	Length
1.	"American Beat"	Lemmy Kilmister, Slim Jim Phantom, Danny B Harvey	The Head Cat	1:43
2.	"Say Mama"	Gene Vincent & The Blue Caps, Joe Meek, Johnny Earl	Gene Vincent	2:01
3.	"I Ain't Never"	Mel Tillis, Webb Pierce	Mel Tillis	1:52
4.	"Bad Boy"	Larry Williams	Larry Williams	1:57
5.	"Shakin' All Over"	Frederick Heath	Johnny Kidd & the Pirates	2:33
6.	"Let It Rock"	Chuck Berry	Chuck Berry	2:06
7.	"Something Else"	Sharon Sheeley, Eddie Cochran	Eddie Cochran	2:04
8.	"The Eagle Flies on Friday"	Kilmister, Phantom, Harvey	The Head Cat	3:22
9.	"Trying to Get to You"	Charles Singleton, Rose Marie McCoy	The Eagles	2:23
10.	"You Can't Do That"	Lennon–McCartney	The Beatles	2:28
11.	"It'll Be Me"	Jerry Lee Lewis, Jack Clement	Jerry Lee Lewis	1:57
12.	"Crossroads"	Robert Johnson	Robert Johnson	3:03

== Personnel ==
- Lemmy Kilmister - bass guitar, vocals
- Slim Jim Phantom - drums
- Danny B Harvey - guitar, piano
- TJ McDonnell - percussion
