= Lemmy =

English rock musician (1945–2015)

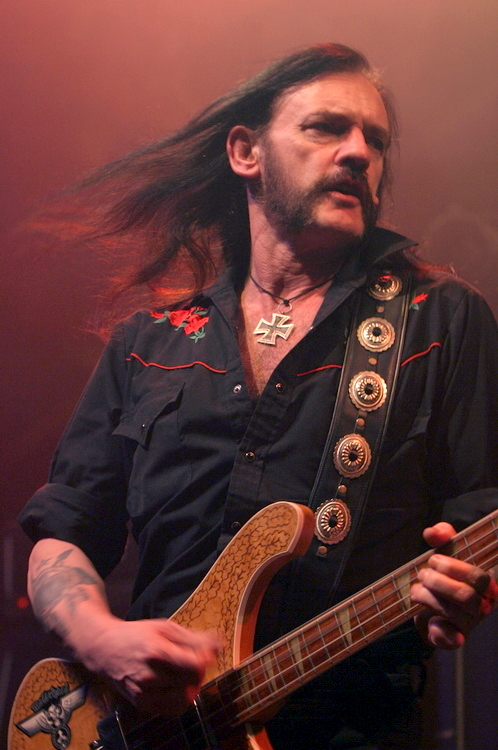
- Lemmy performing in 2005

Background information
- Also known as: Lemmy Kilmister; Ian Willis
- Born: Ian Fraser Kilmister; 24 December 1945; Burslem, Stoke-on-Trent, Staffordshire, England
- Died: 28 December 2015 (aged 70) Los Angeles, California, US
- Genres: Heavy metal; hard rock; rock and roll; speed metal; space rock (early)
- Occupations: Musician; singer; songwriter
- Instruments: Vocals; bass
- Years active: 1960–2015
- Formerly of: Motörhead; Hawkwind; The Rockin' Vickers; Opal Butterfly; The Head Cat; Sam Gopal
- Website: imotorhead.com

Ian Fraser Kilmister (24 December 1945 – 28 December 2015), better known as Lemmy Kilmister or mononymously as Lemmy, was an English musician best known for being the founder, lead vocalist, bassist and primary songwriter of Motörhead, of which he was the only continuous member from 1975 to his death. He had been a member of Hawkwind from 1971 to 1975.

A foundational force in the genre following the advent of the new wave of British heavy metal, Lemmy was known for his appearance, which included his signature sideburns, his military-influenced fashion sense and his gravelly, raspy voice that was once declared "one of the most recognisable voices in rock". He was also noted for his unique posture when singing, which was once described as "looking up towards a towering microphone tilted down into his weather-beaten face". He was also known for his bass playing style, using his Rickenbacker bass to create an "overpowered, distorted rhythmic rumble". A notable aspect of his bass sound was his guitar-like riffing, often playing power chords using heavily overdriven tube stacks by Marshall.

Lemmy was born in Stoke-on-Trent and grew up there, in the nearby towns of Newcastle-under-Lyme and Madeley, and later in the village of Benllech, Anglesey, Wales and briefly at Gwrych Castle, Abergele. He was influenced by rock and roll and the early works of the Beatles, which led to him playing in several rock groups in the 1960s, such as the Rockin' Vickers. He worked as a member of the road crew for Jimi Hendrix and the Nice before joining the space rock band Hawkwind in 1971, where he sang lead vocals on their hit "Silver Machine". In 1975, he was fired from Hawkwind after an arrest for drug possession. That same year, he founded Motörhead. The band's success peaked with the hit single "Ace of Spades" (1980) and the live album No Sleep 'til Hammersmith (1981), which reached number one on the UK Albums Chart.

Lemmy continued to record and tour regularly with Motörhead until his death on 28 December 2015 in Los Angeles, where he had lived since 1990. He was diagnosed with prostate cancer two days before his death. Alongside his music career, he had minor roles and cameos in film and television. He was known for his hard-living, road-driven lifestyle, which included chain-smoking and daily consumption of large amounts of alcohol until 2013 as well as amphetamines.

== Early life ==
Lemmy was born Ian Fraser Kilmister in the Burslem area of Stoke-on-Trent on 24 December 1945. When he was three months old, his father, an ex-Royal Air Force chaplain and concert pianist, left his mother. Lemmy was their only child. He moved with his mother and grandmother to nearby Newcastle-under-Lyme, then to Madeley. When Lemmy was 10, in 1956, his mother married former rugby player George L. Willis, who already had two older children from a previous marriage, whom Ian disliked. They later moved to a farm in the village of Benllech on Anglesey in Wales, with Lemmy commenting that "funnily enough, being the only English kid among 700 Welsh ones didn't make for the happiest time, but it was interesting from an anthropological point of view". He attended Ysgol Syr Thomas Jones, a comprehensive school in Amlwch, where he was nicknamed "Lemmy." It was later suggested by some that the name originated from the phrase "lemmy [lend me] a quid 'til Friday" because of his alleged habit of borrowing money from people to play slot machines, although Lemmy himself said that he did not know the origin of the name. He soon started to show an interest in rock and roll, girls, motorbikes and horses.

At school, Lemmy noticed a pupil who had brought a guitar to school and had been "surrounded by chicks." His mother had a guitar, which he then took to school, and was himself surrounded by girls even though he could not play. By the time he left school, he had moved with his family to Conwy after his mum bought a smallholding.

After leaving school, he had several odd jobs, including a horse breeder and on a factory assembly line at the local Hotpoint electric appliance factory in Llandudno Junction. He also played guitar for local bands such as the Sundowners. He saw the Beatles perform at The Cavern Club in Liverpool when he was 16, and then learned to play along on guitar to their debut studio album Please Please Me (1963). He also admired the sarcastic attitude of the group, particularly that of John Lennon, and later said of the group, "Brian Epstein cleaned them up for mass consumption, but they were anything but sissies. They were from Liverpool ... a hard, sea-farin' town, all these dockers and sailors around all the time who would beat the piss out of you if you so much as winked at them. ... The Rolling Stones were the mummy's boys—they were all college students from the outskirts of London. ... The Stones made great records, but they were always shit on stage, whereas the Beatles were the gear."

== Career ==
=== 1960–1970: Early years ===
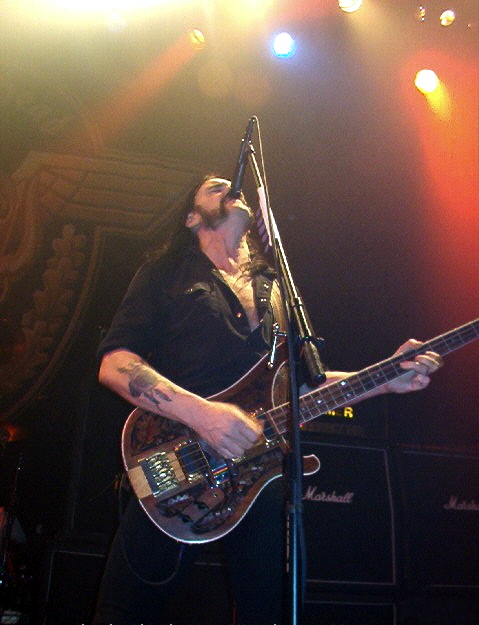
Lemmy playing bass and singing, with his trademark high microphone position

In Stockport, Lemmy joined local bands the Rainmakers and then the Motown Sect who played northern clubs for three years. In 1965, he joined The Rockin' Vickers who signed a deal with CBS, released three singles and toured Europe, reportedly being the first British band to visit the Socialist Federal Republic of Yugoslavia. The Rockin' Vickers moved to Manchester, where they shared a flat together. Lemmy experienced his first commercial success when the Rockin' Vickers version of the Kinks' "Dandy" became a top-ten hit on Tio i Topp in Sweden during December 1966.

In 1967, Lemmy left the Rockin' Vickers and moved to London. He shared a flat with Noel Redding, bassist of the Jimi Hendrix Experience, and with Neville Chesters, their road manager. He got a job in the road crew for the band. In 1968, he joined the psychedelic rock band Sam Gopal under the name Ian Willis and recorded the album Escalator which was released in 1969. After meeting Simon King at a shopping centre in Chelsea in 1969, he joined the band Opal Butterfly, but the group soon disbanded, having failed to raise enough interest with their singles.

=== 1971–1975: Hawkwind ===
See also Hawkwind (1970–75: United Artists era)

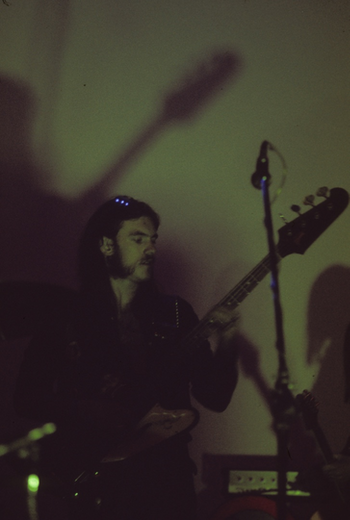
Lemmy in 1974 in St. Louis, US Hawkwind Hall of the Mountain Grill tour (his last with the band)

In August 1971, Lemmy joined the space rock band Hawkwind, who were based in Ladbroke Grove, London, as a bassist and vocalist. He had no previous experience as a bass guitarist, and was cajoled into joining immediately before a benefit gig in Notting Hill by bandmate Michael "Dik Mik" Davies, to have two members who enjoyed amphetamine. Lemmy states that he originally auditioned for Hawkwind as a guitarist, but on the morning of the Notting Hill gig, they decided not to get another guitarist. By chance, the bass player did not show up and left his equipment in the van. He often said, "Their bass player was pretty much saying 'please steal my gig!' So I stole his gig." Lemmy quickly developed a distinctive style that was strongly shaped by his early experience as a rhythm guitarist, often using double stops and chords rather than the single note lines preferred by most bassists. His bass work was a distinctive part of the Hawkwind sound during his tenure, perhaps best documented on the double live album Space Ritual. He also provided the lead vocals on several songs, including the band's biggest UK chart single, "Silver Machine", which reached No. 3 in 1972.

In May 1975, during a North American tour, Lemmy was arrested at the Canadian border in Windsor, Ontario, on drug possession charges. The border police mistook the amphetamine he was carrying for cocaine and he was kept overnight in jail before being released without charge. The band and management were concerned that his arrest might stop the band from crossing back into the United States, even though he had been released without charge. Along with his erratic behaviour, this prompted the band to fire Lemmy.

He once said of Hawkwind: "I did like being in Hawkwind, and I believe I'd still be playing with them today if I hadn't been kicked out. It was fun onstage, not so much offstage. They didn't want to mesh with me. Musically, I loved the drummer, the guitar player. It was a great band."

=== 1975–2015: Motörhead ===
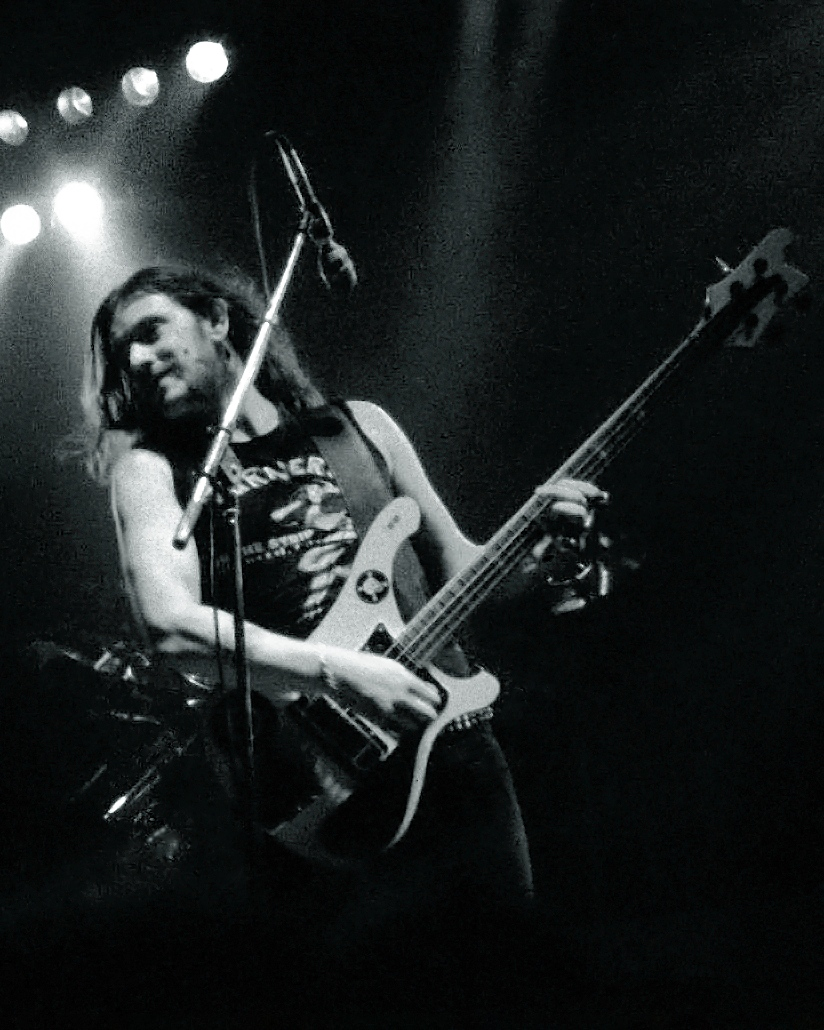
Lemmy with Motörhead in 1982

After Hawkwind, Lemmy formed a new band, first called "Bastard", with guitarist Larry Wallis (former member of the Pink Fairies, Steve Peregrin Took's band Shagrat and UFO) and drummer Lucas Fox. Lemmy and Took were friends, and Took was the stepfather to Lemmy's son Paul. When his manager informed him that a band by the name of "Bastard" would never get a slot on Top of the Pops, Lemmy changed the band's name to "Motörhead" – the title of the last song he had written for Hawkwind.

Soon after, Wallis and Fox were replaced with guitarist "Fast" Eddie Clarke and drummer Phil "Philthy Animal" Taylor and with this line-up, the band began to achieve success. Lemmy's guttural vocals were unique in rock at that time, and were copied during the time when punk rock became popular. The band's sound appealed to Lemmy's original fans and, eventually, to fans of punk. Lemmy asserted that he generally felt more kinship with punks than with metalheads; he also played with the Damned for a handful of gigs when they had no regular bassist.

Motörhead's success peaked in 1980 and 1981 with several UK chart hits, including the single "Ace of Spades," which remained a crowd favourite throughout the band's career, and the UK No. 1 live album No Sleep 'til Hammersmith.

In October 2005, Classic Rock presented Lemmy with its first "Living Legend" award.

Motörhead became one of the most influential bands in the heavy metal genre. Their, and Lemmy's, final live performance was in Berlin, on 11 December 2015 during the band's 40th Anniversary Tour.

=== Collaborations ===
Lemmy worked with several musicians, apart from his Motörhead bandmates, over the course of his career. He wrote the song "R.A.M.O.N.E.S" for the Ramones, which he played in his live sets as a tribute to the band. He also produced a Ramones EP and an album for Warfare entitled Metal Anarchy in which Würzel guested on guitar. He was brought in as a songwriter for Ozzy Osbourne's 1991 No More Tears album, providing lyrics for the tracks "Hellraiser," (which Motörhead later recorded themselves and released as a single), "Desire," "I Don't Want to Change the World" and the single "Mama, I'm Coming Home". Lemmy noted in several magazine and television interviews that he made more money from the royalties of that one song than he had in his entire time with Motörhead. He also appeared in music videos for other musicians, such as the Ramones' version for The Who's "Substitute" and the Foo Fighters' "White Limo". After being diagnosed with Type 2 diabetes in 2000, for which he was hospitalised briefly, Lemmy again appeared with Motörhead at WrestleMania X-Seven playing WWE wrestler Triple H to the ring. Lemmy published his autobiography, White Line Fever, in November 2002. In 2005, Motörhead won their first Grammy in the Best Metal Performance category with their cover of Metallica's "Whiplash". In the same year he began recording an unreleased solo album titled Lemmy & Friends, which was intended to include a collaboration with Janet Jackson.

In 2014, he established his own recording label, Motorhead Music, to promote and develop new talent. Acts he signed to the label and helped develop include Barb Wire Dolls, Budderside, and Phil Campbell and the Bastard Sons.

=== Film and television ===
Lemmy made appearances in film and television, including science fiction film Hardware (1990) and the comedy Eat the Rich (1987), for which Motörhead also recorded the soundtracks including the title song. He appeared as himself in The Comic Strip Presents... episode "More Bad News" (1986), along with fellow heavy metal musicians Ozzy Osbourne, the Scorpions and Def Leppard. In 1984, Motörhead were the musical guests on the TV show The Young Ones, in the episode "Bambi". He appears in Airheads (1994), in which he is credited as "Lemmy von Motörhead". Lemmy has a cameo in Ron Jeremy's pornographic film John Wayne Bobbitt Uncut (1994) as the discoverer of Bobbitt's severed penis. The appendage is thrown from the window of a moving car and lands at Lemmy's feet who exclaims: "Looks like a dick! Fucking hell! Ah well, it's not mine at least." The film's soundtrack also features the Motörhead song "Under the Knife".

He also appeared in several films from Troma Entertainment, including the narrator in Tromeo and Juliet (1996) and as himself in both Terror Firmer (1999) and Citizen Toxie: The Toxic Avenger IV (2000). His last role was portraying the President of the United States in Return to Nuke 'Em High Volume 1 (2013). He has a cameo role in the film Down and Out with the Dolls (Kurt Voss, 2001), where he plays a lodger who lives in a closet.

In 2008, he appeared on Down and Dirty with Jim Norton as the series DJ, and also wrote the theme music.

He appeared in a 2001 advertisement for Kit Kat, playing violin as part of a string quartet in a genteel tearoom. In 2015, Lemmy appeared as a central figure in the Björn Tagemose-directed silent film Gutterdämmerung opposite Grace Jones, Henry Rollins, Iggy Pop, Tom Araya of Slayer and Eagles of Death Metal's Jesse Hughes.

== Personal life ==
=== Relationships and children ===
At the age of 17, Lemmy met a holidaying girl named Cathy. He followed her to Stockport, where she gave birth to his son Sean, who was put up for adoption. In the 2010 documentary film Lemmy, he mentioned having a son whose mother had only recently reconnected with him and "hadn't got the heart to tell him who his father was." Later, during his time with the Rockin' Vickers, he had a son, Paul Inder, with a woman in Manchester named Tracy; Lemmy met this son six years later. As an adult, Inder became a guitarist and occasionally joined Lemmy on stage.

Lemmy stated many times that the love of his life was Susan Bennett, who died in 1971 at age 19 by drowning in a bath after a heroin overdose. He dedicated his autobiography to her and also hated heroin due to the incident.

=== Residences ===
From 1990 until his death in 2015, Lemmy lived in a rent-controlled two-room apartment in West Hollywood, two blocks away from his favourite hangout, the Rainbow Bar and Grill.

=== Sexual activity ===
In the Channel 4 documentary Motörhead: Live Fast, Die Old (2005), it was claimed that Lemmy had sex with over 2,000 women. He later quipped, "I said more than 1,000; the magazine made 2,000 of it."

In 2006, Maxim ranked Lemmy at No. 8 on its top ten "Living Sex Legends" list, claiming that he had sex with around 1,200 women.

He is featured in the book Sex Tips from Rock Stars (2010) by Paul Miles.

=== Dave Grohl comments ===
Dave Grohl, on his Probot website, describes musicians with whom he has worked. In his entry for Lemmy, he wrote:

We recorded [Lemmy's] track in Los Angeles in maybe two takes about a year and a half ago. Until then I'd never met what I'd call a real rock 'n' roll hero before. Fuck Elvis and Keith Richards, Lemmy's the king of rock 'n' roll—he told me he never considered Motörhead a metal band, he was quite adamant. Lemmy's a living, breathing, drinking and snorting fucking legend. No one else comes close.

=== Alcohol and drugs ===
Lemmy was well known for his heavy drinking. The documentary Motörhead: Live Fast Die Old stated that he drank a bottle of Jack Daniel's every day and had done so since he was 30 years old. In 2013, he stopped drinking Jack Daniel's for health reasons.

During his time with Hawkwind, he developed an addiction to amphetamines.

In 1969, Lemmy ingested a teaspoon of atropine sulfate, believing it to be amphetamine sulfate, provided accidentally by a nurse's-turned-dispensary acquaintance. The massive overdose caused wild hallucinations, including a chat with a television, before he passed out and was rushed to the hospital just in time. He had bizarre hallucinations for two weeks post-recovery.

Lemmy stated that his intense touring, such as playing 53 shows in 56 days in 1979, was impossible without drugs.

In 1980, he tried to get a complete blood transfusion but was denied since his system was saturated with alcohol and drugs that it would have resulted in a heart attack; the doctor described his blood as "chemical paste". He was also banned from donating blood.

In November 2005, he was invited to the National Assembly for Wales as a guest speaker by Conservative member William Graham. He was asked to express his views on the detrimental effects of drugs and called for the legalisation of heroin. He stated that legalisation would eradicate the drug dealer from society and generate money from its taxation, however hard this would be to accept.

=== Nazi regalia collection ===
Lemmy collected regalia of the Nazi Party and other countries of the Axis powers, and had an Iron Cross emblazoned on his bass. Lemmy’s apartment in West Hollywood was filled with Swastika flags, Reichsadler eagle monuments, and ceremonial Wehrmacht daggers. The hobby led to accusations of Nazi sympathies; however, he stated that he collected Nazi memorabilia because he liked the way it looked, and it had nothing to do with his political affiliation, saying "It’s not my fault the bad guys had the best shit". Nazi symbolism is illegal in Germany, and a photo taken to promote Motörhead's appearance at the 2008 Wacken Rocks Seaside show in Aurich was nearly banned by the authorities due to Lemmy wearing a Waffen-SS cap. Lemmy defended his collection by saying that if his then-girlfriend, who was black, had no problem with it, nobody else should. Lemmy estimated that his collection of Nazi memorabilia had a value of over US$250,000.

Jeff Hanneman, the founder of the thrash metal band Slayer, befriended Lemmy due to their shared fondness for collecting Nazi memorabilia.

According to Keith Emerson's autobiography, Pictures of an Exhibitionist (2004), Lemmy gave him two of his Hitler Youth knives during his time as a roadie for the Nice. Emerson used these knives many times as keyholders when playing the Hammond organ during concerts with the Nice and Emerson, Lake & Palmer before destroying them.

=== Other collections ===
Lemmy also collected toys from Kinder Surprise eggs and had a rider requiring Kinder Surprise eggs to be provided while on tour.

=== Religious and political views ===
Lemmy was against religion, government, and established authority.

He considered himself an anarchist and said that "government causes more problems than it solves".

In 2011, he identified as agnostic, saying: "I can find out when I die. I can wait. I'm not in a hurry." His father, who was a priest, left the family when Lemmy was 3 months old, which later shaped his opinion on religion. After his mother wanted to marry his stepfather, a devout Roman Catholic, the Vatican sent them a letter that they must declare Lemmy to be illegitimate. They then excommunicated his stepfather.

Lemmy spoke against racism many times, calling it "so dumb," and stating in interviews that he could never understand hating someone without speaking to them.

== Illness and death ==
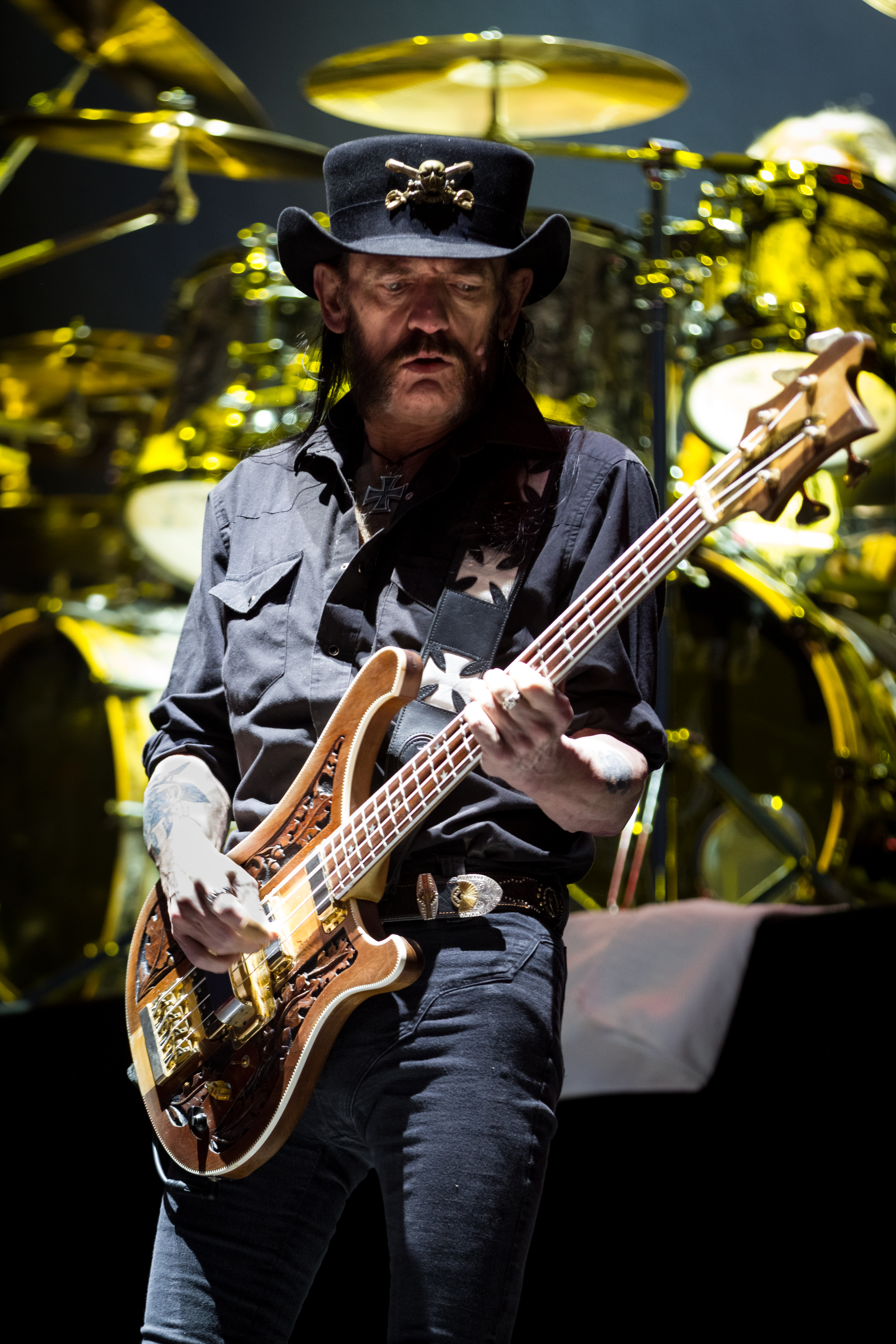
Lemmy performing in 2015

In December 2000, Lemmy's tour was cancelled when he was hospitalised in Italy with flu, exhaustion and a lung infection. Lemmy was hospitalised with extreme dehydration and exhaustion in Germany in July 2005.

As he grew older, he consumed less alcohol and drugs because he suffered from Type 2 diabetes and hypertension.

In June 2013, he had surgery to have an implantable cardioverter-defibrillator fitted in his chest.

His tour was cancelled in July 2013 due to a severe haematoma.

He referred to his continuing drug use as "dogged insolence in the face of mounting opposition to the contrary".

Towards the end of his life, he had to use a walking stick.

Lemmy had started smoking at the age of 11. In August 2015, he said he had cut down his smoking habit from two packs a day to one pack a week.

In 2013, Lemmy said he was not afraid of death.

He was hospitalised with a lung infection in September 2015, after having breathing problems when performing onstage.

=== Death ===
According to Lemmy's manager, Todd Singerman:

He [Lemmy] gets home [from tour], we have a big birthday party for him at the Whisky a Go Go. His friends came down and played. Two days later I could tell he wasn't feeling good. So we took him to the hospital. They release him. Then after the brain scan, they found the cancer in his brain and his neck. The doctor comes with the result a couple of days later and says "It's terminal."

Lemmy's doctor had given him between two and six months to live. Mikael Maglieri, owner of his nearby hangout Rainbow Bar and Grill, subsequently had a video game machine that Lemmy was fond of playing taken from the establishment and put in Lemmy's apartment so he could continue playing it from his bedside. Although his manager had planned to keep the news private until his eventual death, Lemmy strongly encouraged him to make the diagnosis public in early 2016, but he died 2 days later, before a press release could be drafted.

On 28 December 2015, Lemmy died at his Los Angeles apartment from prostate cancer, cardiac arrhythmia and congestive heart failure. He was 70 years old.

=== Funeral ===
Lemmy's memorial service took place at Forest Lawn Memorial Park, Hollywood Hills, on 9 January 2016. The service was streamed live over YouTube with more than 230,000 people logging on to watch, while others gathered at the Rainbow.

His body was cremated following the funeral. His remains were placed in a 3D-printed urn shaped like his trademark cavalry hat and emblazoned with the slogan "Born to lose, lived to win".

Some of Lemmy's ashes were, by his own request, put into bullets and sent to his closest friends, including Whitfield Crane of Ugly Kid Joe, Rob Halford of Judas Priest, Michael Monroe of Hanoi Rocks, Doro Pesch of Warlock, and Riki Rachtman. Some of Lemmy's ashes were also scattered into the mud at Wacken Open Air music festival in Schleswig-Holstein, Germany, in August 2023. James Hetfield received an Ace of Spades tattoo on his middle finger that incorporated some of Lemmy's ashes.

=== Estate ===
According to the London probate office, Lemmy's estate was worth £528,806 and it was all left to his son, Paul Inder.

=== Tributes ===
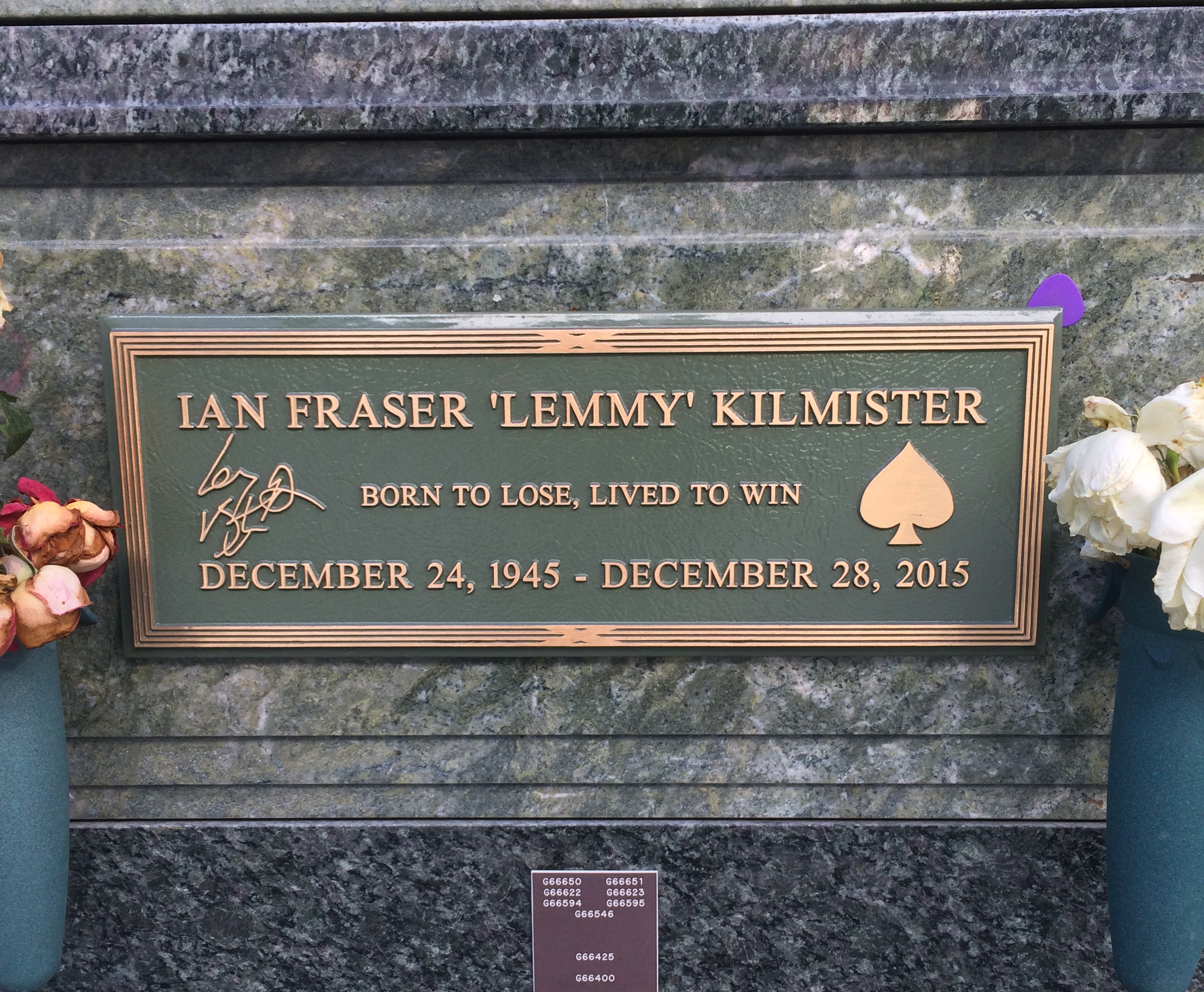
Lemmy's grave at Forest Lawn Memorial Park

Tributes were paid by fellow rock stars such as Rob Halford, Dave Grohl, Ozzy Osbourne, Alice Cooper, Metallica, Scott Ian of Anthrax and Black Sabbath guitarist Tony Iommi.

In February 2016, the Hollywood Vampires performed at the Grammy Award ceremony as a tribute to Lemmy. On 11 June, Download Festival paid tribute to Lemmy by renaming the main stage the "Lemmy Stage", and in the slot where Motörhead were due to play, there was a video tribute to Lemmy in which they played his music and his peers talked about him. On 17 November, Metallica released a tribute song titled "Murder One", named after Lemmy's frequently used amp. The song, from their tenth studio album Hardwired... to Self-Destruct, depicts Lemmy's rise to fame. On 18 January 2017, Lemmy was inducted into the Hall of Heavy Metal History for being the creator of thrash metal. In 2017, the extinct crocodile relative Lemmysuchus was named after Lemmy. In November 2016, asteroid 243002 was officially named 243002 Lemmy, complementing asteroid 250840 Motorhead, named after the band in 2014.

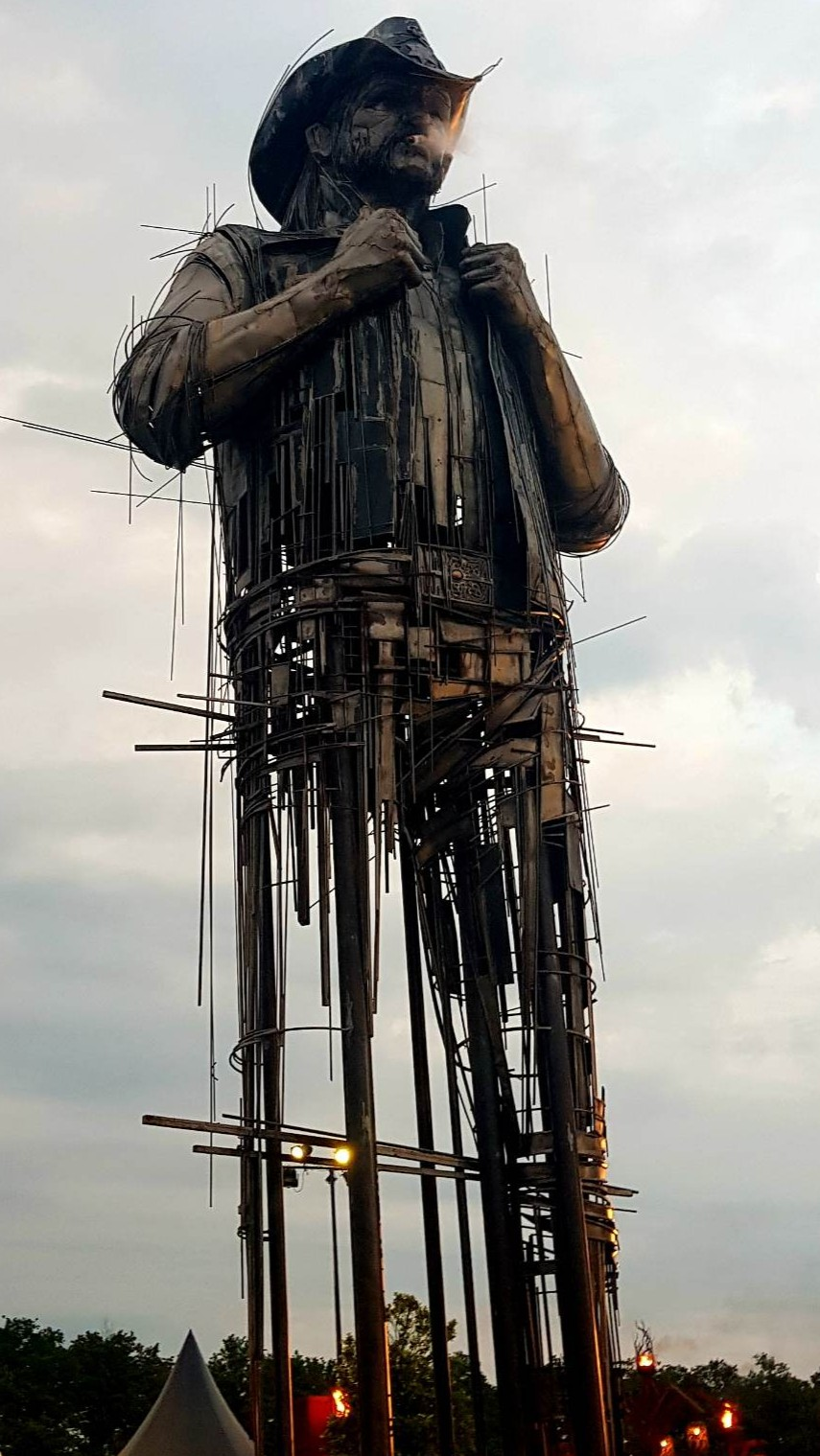
Lemmy's statue, Hellfest, France

In 2016, Hellfest unveiled a 15-metre-high statue in tribute to Lemmy, in the presence of Phil Campbell. It was replaced by a new statue in 2022, which included a memorial containing some of Lemmy's ashes.

In 2018, Hawkwind recorded a new acoustic version of Lemmy's "The Watcher" (originally recorded on Doremi Fasol Latido) on the studio album Road to Utopia with production, arrangement and additional orchestrations by Mike Batt and a guest appearance from Eric Clapton.

In March 2024, British metal sculpture artist Alan Williams was commissioned by Vicky Hungerford, Director of Bloodstock Open Air Festival, to create a memorial bust of Lemmy. The bust was to permanently house some of his ashes in a custom built container. It portrays Lemmy as he was around the early eighties and is made from recycled steel, industrial tools, and Harley-Davidson and Challenger 2 tank parts. The bust was unveiled by Motörhead guitarist Phil Campbell (musician) at Bloodstock Festival on August 9th 2024.

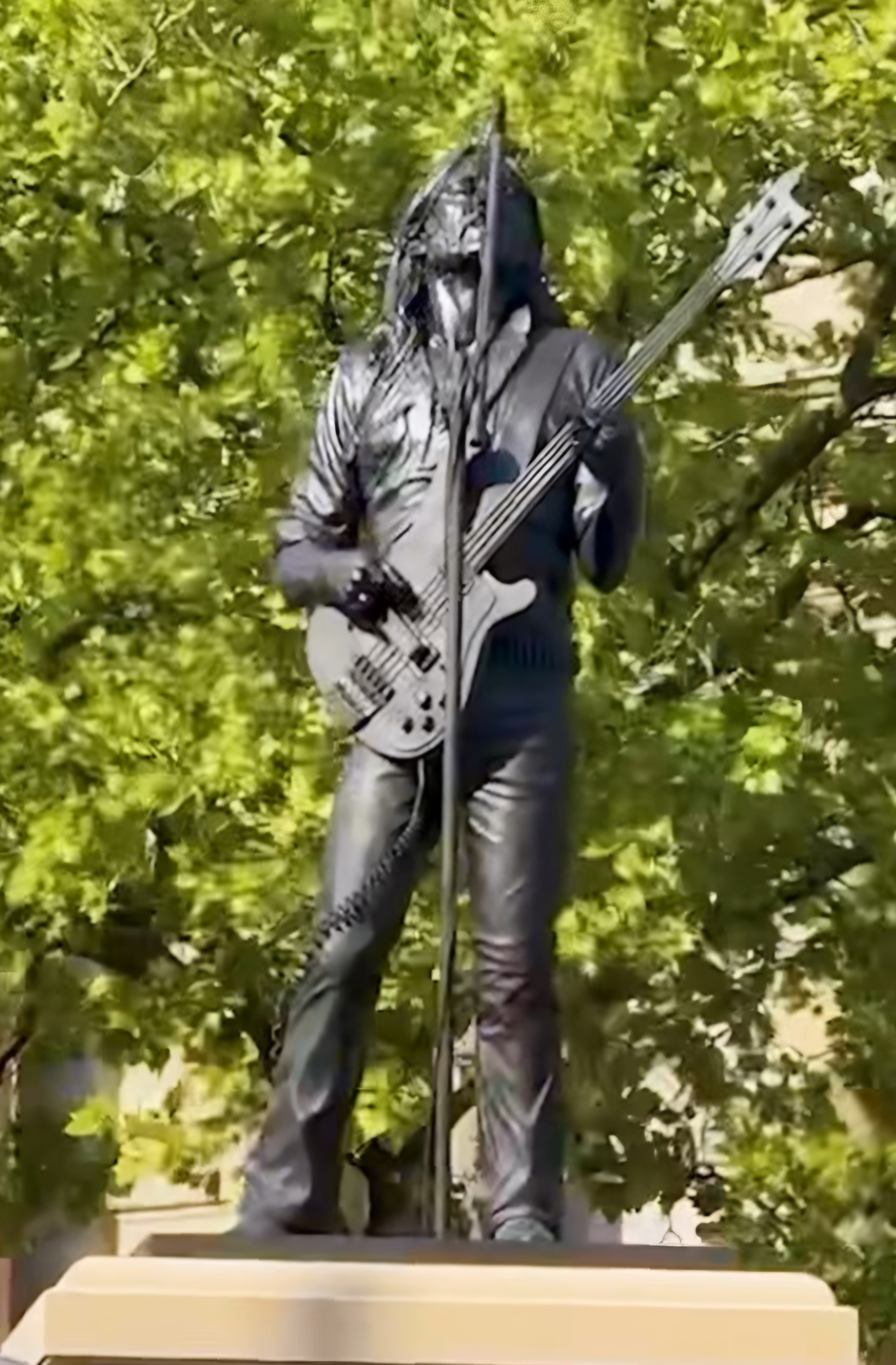
Statue of Lemmy in Market Place, Burslem. Unveiled 9 May 2025

In May 2025, a statue of Lemmy by local sculptor Andy Edwards was unveiled on Market Place in Burslem, in the presence of Motörhead guitarist Phil Campbell. The statue portrays him with his Rickenbacker 4001 bass, with his head tilted up towards a microphone and contains a small portion of Lemmy's ashes in the plinth.

==== Lemmy film ====
The rockumentary film Lemmy (2010) was directed and produced by Greg Olliver and Wes Orshoski. It consists of a combination of 16 mm film and HD video footage, produced over three years. It features interviews with friends, peers and admirers such as Dave Grohl, Slash, Ozzy Osbourne, James Hetfield, Lars Ulrich, Kirk Hammett, and Robert Trujillo of Metallica, David Ellefson of Megadeth, Scott Ian of Anthrax, Alice Cooper, Peter Hook of Joy Division/New Order, Dee Snider, Nikki Sixx, Mick Jones of the Clash, Ice-T, Kat Von D, Henry Rollins, Lars Frederiksen of Rancid, Jim Heath of The Reverend Horton Heat, Slim Jim Phantom of the Stray Cats, Mike Inez, Joan Jett, pro skateboarder Geoff Rowley, pro wrestler Triple H, "Fast" Eddie Clarke, Jarvis Cocker of Pulp, Marky Ramone, former Hawkwind bandmates Dave Brock and Stacia and Steve Vai.

=== In video games ===
Lemmy was the main character in the 16-bit video game Motörhead, released for the Commodore Amiga and Atari ST in 1992. He also appeared as an unlockable character in the 2009 game Guitar Hero: Metallica. He also provided his voice for the 2009 video game Brütal Legend, voicing the Kill Master, a character designed and based on his surname and likeness. Lemmy was also the inspiration for the Mario character Lemmy Koopa, who made his first appearance in Super Mario Bros. 3. In the Victor Vran Downloadable content "Motorhead Through The Ages", there is a new "Lemmy's Outfit" armour. The other Motörhead bandmates' armour is also available. As an easter egg, a holographic woman in the final level of 2020's DOOM Eternal proclaims, "Lemmy is God!". The appearance of the character King Novik from the same video game is also loosely based on facial features of Lemmy. Deep Rock Galactic features one of Lemmy's hats as a cosmetic called "The Ace of Spades" with the description "In honor of a motoring head."

== Equipment ==
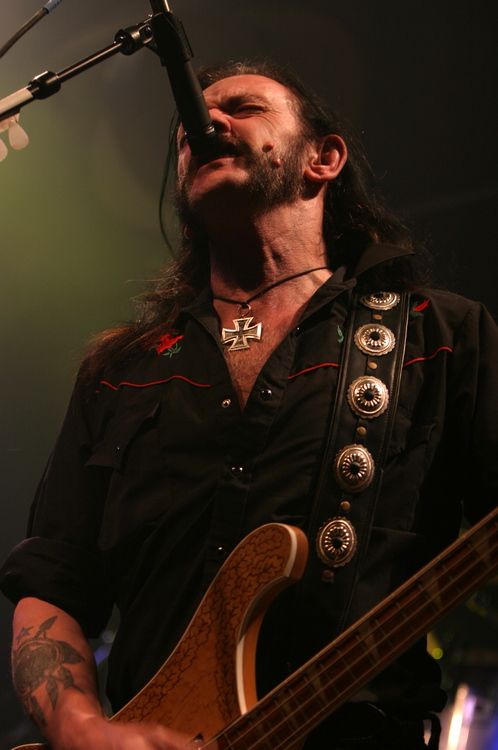
Lemmy in his trademark singing stance, 2005

Lemmy positioned his microphone in an uncommonly high position, angled so that he appeared to be looking up at the sky rather than at the audience. He said that it was for "personal comfort, that's all. It's also one way of avoiding seeing the audience. In the days when we only had ten people and a dog, it was a way of avoiding seeing that we only had ten people and a dog." Inspired by Jimi Hendrix, Lemmy recorded his vocals in the studio in total privacy, meaning he would sing in an enclosed recording booth where no one can see him, not even the producer.

As a member of Hawkwind, Lemmy first used a Rickenbacker belonging to Dave Anderson. When Anderson failed to show up for a charity gig, Lemmy took his place. Following the departure of Anderson, Kilmister bought a Hopf Studio bass off Hawkwind synth player Del Dettmar. He used Rickenbacker basses for most of his career. From 1996 onward, Lemmy's main bass was a Rickenbacker 4001LK, from a limited edition run of 50 instruments, featuring hand carved body wings, featuring oak leaves, three HB1 humbucker pick-ups and all gold plated hardware. Lemmy had commented that at last Rickenbacker had made decent pick-ups. When asked about the appeal of the Rickenbacker instruments, Lemmy said "The shape. I'm all for the image — always. If you get one that looks good, you can always mess with the pickups if it sounds bad."

With Hawkwind, Lemmy used a Selmer amplifier. With Motorhead, he got a Marshall Amplification 1992 JMP Super Bass Mark 2 bass stack from 1976, with a 4x15" and a 4x12" cabinet. In 2008, Marshall issued a model dedicated to Lemmy, the 1992LEM, which was available with the same cabinets Lemmy used.

Lemmy had equipment and items featured in the Rock and Roll Hall of Fame; his Ace of Spades tour jacket was lost by the museum in 2012, leading to a spat.

== Musical style ==
Lemmy's approach to bass guitar was somewhat unusual, and strongly influenced by his early experience as a rhythm guitarist. Rather than the traditional bass parts featuring a series of individually plucked single notes, he usually strummed forcefully and often played more than one note or string at a time. With amplification he set gain, treble and mid knobs to high levels to enhance his piercing sound, while the bass knob was turned low to allow more definition. The result was his bass playing covered more of the mid-range frequencies than typical and had a droning quality compared to a circular saw.

He described his style as: "I play a lot of notes, but I also play a lot of chords. And I play a lot of open strings. I just don't play like a bass player. There are complaints about me from time to time. It's not like having a bass player; it's like having a deep guitarist."

John Entwistle of The Who was Lemmy's main inspiration as a bassist. He never attempted to directly imitate Entwistle’s style but rather took cues from Entwistle’s bold tone and serving a more prominent than usual melodic role.

Lemmy's unconventional playing style changed the dynamics of rhythm sections in the groups he played with. Hawkwind drummer Simon King explained that "A lot of the time I play with [guitarist] Dave - he'll get into a kind of rhythmic thing and I'll follow him so you get this kind of percussion and rhythmic guitar thing going, so Lemmy can loon forward a bit because he's very much a front man and gives off a lot of energy, so he can get out front and play a sort of lead on bass which sometimes is very effective". Motörhead drummer Taylor echoed the sentiment with: "Onstage he's difficult to follow cos he's not really a bass player. There's no solid bass lines to follow. A lot of the time I play more with Eddie [Clarke] than with Lemmy, but he's out on his own because he is what he is." Taylor also stated he modified his drum style when performing with Lemmy, often emphasizing the lower pitched tom toms in his drum kit, to help fill out the low-end frequencies usually handled by the bass guitarist in a rock band.

== Discography ==
For releases with Motörhead see the Motörhead discography

=== With the Rockin' Vickers ===
- 1965 – "Zing! Went the Strings of My Heart" / "Stella" (7" single)
- 1965 – "It's Alright" / "Stay By Me" (7" single)
- 1966 – "Dandy" / "I Don't Need Your Kind" (7" single)
- 2000 – The Complete: It's Alright (compilation)

=== With Sam Gopal ===
- 1969 – Escalator
- 1969 – "Horse" / "Back Door Man" (7" single)

=== With Hawkwind ===
- 1972 – "Silver Machine" / "Seven by Seven" (7" single)
- 1972 – Glastonbury Fayre – contains "Silver Machine" and "Welcome to the Future"
- 1972 – Greasy Truckers Party – contains "Born to Go" and "Master of the Universe" (10/11 Hawkwind tracks on 2007 re-release)
- 1972 – Doremi Fasol Latido
- 1973 – "Lord of Light" / "Born to Go" (7" single)
- 1973 – "Urban Guerrilla" / "Brainbox Pollution" (7" single)
- 1973 – Space Ritual
- 1974 – Hall of the Mountain Grill
- 1974 – "Psychedelic Warlords" / "It's So Easy" (7" single)
- 1975 – "Kings of Speed" / "Motorhead" (7" single)
- 1975 – Warrior on the Edge of Time
- 1983 – The Weird Tapes (live and out-takes, 1967–1982)
- 1984 – The Earth Ritual Preview EP (guest appearance as bass and backing vocals on Night of the Hawks)
- 1985 – Bring Me the Head of Yuri Gagarin (live 1973)
- 1985 – Space Ritual Volume 2 (live 1972)
- 1986 – Hawkwind Anthology (live and out-takes, 1967–1982)
- 1991 – BBC Radio 1 Live in Concert (live 1972)
- 1992 – The Friday Rock Show Sessions (live 1986)
- 1997 – The 1999 Party (live 1974)

=== With Robert Calvert's band ===
- 1974 – "Ejection" / "Catch a Falling Starfighter" (7" single)
- 1974 – Captain Lockheed and the Starfighters
- 1980 – "Lord of the Hornets" / "The Greenfly and the Rose" (7" single)

=== Side projects and career-spanning groups ===
- 1990 – Lemmy & The Upsetters – Blue Suede Shoes
- 2000 – Lemmy, Slim Jim & Danny B (aka the Head Cat) – Lemmy, Slim Jim & Danny B
- 2006 – The Head Cat – Fool's Paradise
- 2006 – The Head Cat – Rockin' the Cat Club: Live from the Sunset Strip
- 2006 – Lemmy – Damage Case (Compilation)
- 2007 – Keli Raven & Lemmy Kilmister "Bad Boyz 4 Life" (single).
- 2011 – The Head Cat – Walk the Walk...Talk the Talk

=== Band collaborations ===
- 1978 – The Doomed (one-off performance at the Electric Ballroom, 5 September 1978). Bootleg recording with Dave Vanian, Captain Sensible, and Rat Scabies. Brian James had left The Damned and took the rights to the name with him.
- 1979 – The Damned – "I Just Can't Be Happy Today" / "Ballroom Blitz" (with Lemmy on bass) / "Turkey Song" (7" single) – available as bonus track on the reissued Machine Gun Etiquette album
- 1980 – The Young & Moody Band – "Don't Do That" (7" & 12" single)
- 1981 – Headgirl (Motörhead & Girlschool) – St. Valentine's Day Massacre EP
- 1982 – Lemmy & Wendy O. Williams – Stand by Your Man EP
- 1985 – Producer for Warfare on the album Metal Anarchy.

=== Charity collaborations ===
- 1985 – Hear 'n Aid
- 1985 – The Crowd – You'll Never Walk Alone (Bradford City F.C. Fire Disaster)
- 2011 – Emergency – Livewire + Girlschool + Rudy Sarzo vocals (Haiti Appeal)

=== Guest appearances ===
- 1982 – Speed Queen (French band) – Speed Queen – backing vocals on "Revanche"
- 1984 – Albert Järvinen Band – Countdown
- 1986 – Boys Don't Cry – "I Wanna Be a Cowboy" (appears in the music video)
- 1989 – Nina Hagen – Nina Hagen – guests on "Where's the Party"
- 1992 – Bootsauce – Bull – guests on "Hold Tight"
- 1994 – Fast Eddie Clarke – It Ain't Over till It's Over – guests on "Laugh at the Devil".
- 1994 – Shonen Knife – Rock Animals – guests on "Tomato Head" single remix (Track 3 – "Lemmy in There Mix") – not the album track
- 1996 – Skew Siskin – Electric Chair Music
- 1996 – Ugly Kid Joe – Motel California - guest vocals on "Little Red Man"
- 1996 – Myth, Dreams of the World – Stories of the Greek & Roman Gods & Goddesses
- 1996 – Skew Siskin – Voices from the War
- 1997 – Ramones – We're Outta Here! – guests on "R.A.M.O.N.E.S."
- 1999 – Jetboy – Lost & Found
- 1999 – Skew Siskin – What the Hell
- 1999 – A.N.I.M.A.L. – Usa Toda Tu Fuerza – guests on a version of AC/DC's "Highway to Hell"
- 2000 – Doro – Calling the Wild
- 2000 – Swing Cats – A Special Tribute to Elvis – guests on "Good Rockin' Tonight", "Trying to Get to You" and "Stuck on You"
- 2001 – The Pirates – Rock Bottom
- 2001 – Hair of the Dog – Ignite – guests on "Law"
- 2002 – Royal Philharmonic Orchestra, Mike Batt and guests – Philharmania – guests on "Eve of Destruction"
- 2003 – Ace Sounds – Still Hungry
- 2003 – Skew Siskin – Album of the Year
- 2004 – Probot – Probot – guests on "Shake Your Blood"
- 2005 – Throw Rag – 13 Ft. and Rising – guests on "Tonight the Bottle Let Me Down"
- 2006 – Doro – 20 Years – A Warrior Soul – guests on "Love Me Forever" and "All We Are"
- 2007 – Saxon - The Inner Sanctum - guest vocals on "I've Got to Rock (to Stay Alive)"
- 2007 – Meldrum – Blowin' Up The Machine – guests on "Miss Me When I'm Gone"
- 2007 – The Warriors – Genuine Sense of Outrage – guests on "Price of Punishment"
- 2007 – Keli Raven single "Bad Boyz 4 Life" (co-writer and guest vocalist)
- 2008 – Airbourne – Guest actor on Airbourne's "Runnin' Wild" Music Video
- 2008 – We Wish You a Metal Christmas – Run Run Rudolph
- 2008 – Legacy – Girlschool album – Don't Talk to Me vocals, bass, triangle and lyrics.
- 2009 – Guitar Hero: Metallica (video game) – "Ace of Spades" guest vocalist and unlockable playable character.
- 2009 – Queen V – Death or Glory – guests on "Wasted"
- 2009 – Brütal Legend (video game) – The Kill Master (voice)
- 2010 – Slash – Slash – "Doctor Alibi" (vocals and bass)
- 2011 – Michael Monroe – Sensory Overdrive guests on "Debauchery As A Fine Art"
- 2012 – Doro – Raise Your Fist guest on "It Still Hurts"
- 2012 – Nashville Pussy – Guest on Nashville Pussy's song "Lazy Jesus" on the re-release of the album "From Hell to Texas"
- 2014 – Emigrate – Guest bass and vocals on the track Rock City, from their album Silent So Long

=== Film soundtracks, tribute, wrestling and various artists albums ===
- 1990 – Hardware: Original Soundtrack – contains "A Piece of Pipe" by Kaduta Massi with Lemmy
- 1990 – The Last Temptation of Elvis: Blue Suede Shoes – contains "Blue Suede Shoes" by Lemmy & The Upsetters
- 1994 – Airheads: Cameo on film and performing "Born to Raise Hell" on the soundtrack
- 1997 – Dragon Attack: A Tribute to Queen – performs on "Tie Your Mother Down"
- 1998 – Thunderbolt: A Tribute to AC/DC – performs on "It's a Long Way to the Top"
- 1998 – ECW: Extreme Music – contains a cover of Metallica's "Enter Sandman"
- 2000 – Bat Head Soup – Tribute to Ozzy Osbourne – performs on "Desire"
- 2001 – WWF The Music, Vol. 5 – "The Game"
- 2001 – Frezno Smooth: Original Soundtrack – contains a version of Twisted Sister's "Hardcore" by Lemmy
- 2001 – A Tribute to Metallica: Metallic Assault – performs on "Nothing Else Matters"
- 2002 – Rise Above: 24 Black Flag Songs to Benefit the West Memphis Three – performs on "Thirsty & Miserable"
- 2002 – Metal Brigade – performs on "Good Rockin' Tonight" by Lemmy and Johnny Ramone
- 2004 – Spin the Bottle – An All-Star Tribute to KISS – performs on "Shout It Out Loud"
- 2004 – The SpongeBob SquarePants Movie – performs "You Better Swim"
- 2004 – ThemeAddict: WWE The Music, Vol. 6 – "Line in the Sand"
- 2005 – Numbers from the Beast: An All Star Salute to Iron Maiden – performs on "The Trooper"
- 2005 – Metal: A Headbangers Journey
- 2006 – WWE Wreckless Intent – "King of Kings"
- 2006 – Flying High Again: The World's Greatest Tribute to Ozzy Osbourne – Performs "Desire" with Richie Kotzen
- 2006 – Cover Me in '80s Metal (Fantastic Price Records) – Metal artists covering the hits of others. Performs AC/DC's "It's a Long Way to the Top"
- 2006 – Butchering the Beatles: A Headbashing Tribute – Performs "Back in the USSR".
- 2009 – Flip Skateboards Presents Extremely Sorry – Performs "Stand By Me" with Baron and Dave Lombardo.
- 2010 – Danko Jones – Full of Regret – Stars in the music video along with Elijah Wood and Selma Blair
- 2011 – Foo Fighters – White Limo – Stars in the music video
- 2017 – Airbourne – It's All for Rock N' Roll – Videos of Lemmy appeared in the music video. Tribute to Lemmy

== Videography ==
=== VHS/LaserDisc ===
- 1982 Live in Toronto – Castle Hendring
- 1984 Another Perfect Day EP
- 1985 Birthday Party
- 1986 Deaf Not Blind
- 1987 More Bad News
- 1988 EP
- 1988 The Decline of Western Civilization II: The Metal Years
- 1990 Hardware (Lemmy was cast as a water taxi driver; and plays a recording of "Ace of Spades" for his passengers)
- 1991 Everything Louder than Everyone Else

=== DVD ===
- 1987 Eat the Rich
- 1994 Airheads – cameo as "The Rocker"
- 1997 Tromeo and Juliet – cast as Narrator, Troma pictures
- 1999 Terror Firmer
- 2001 Down and Out with the Dolls – as Joe
- 2001 25 & Alive Boneshaker
- 2001 WrestleMania X-Seven – performing Triple H's entrance theme "The Game" live
- 2001 Citizen Toxie: The Toxic Avenger IV – as a Tromaville citizen
- 2002 Motörhead EP
- 2002 The Best of Motörhead
- 2003 The Special Edition EP
- 2003 Charlie's Death Wish – as himself
- 2004 Everything Louder Than Everything Else
- 2005 Stage Fright – also HD DVD 2007
- 2005 Ringers: Lord of the Fans
- 2005 WrestleMania 21 – performing "The Game"
- 2005 Metal: A Headbanger's Journey
- 2006 The Head Cat Live: Rockin' the Cat Club
- 2006 Foo Fighters: Hyde Park
- 2010 Lemmy
- 2011 The Wörld Is Yours – bonus DVD

== Awards ==
Year	Award	Category	Result
2005	Classic Rock Roll of Honour Awards	Living Legend	Won
2005	Metal Hammer Golden Gods Awards	Golden God	Won
2010	Revolver Music Awards	Lifetime Achievement	Won
2013	Revolver Music Awards	Paul Gray Best Bassist	Won
2013	Loudwire Music Awards	Bassist of the Year	Won
2014	The Ox & The Loon	John Entwistle Bass Legend	Won
2017	The Metal Hall of Fame	Hall of Fame (inaugural class)	Inducted
