= Fool's Paradise (The Head Cat album) =

Studio album by The Head Cat
- Released: June 27, 2006
- Recorded: 2006
- Genre: Rock and roll, rockabilly
- Length: 33:32
- Label: Rock-A-Billy 1642
- Producer: The Head Cat

The Head Cat chronology
| Fool's Paradise (2006) | Walk the Walk...Talk the Talk (2011) |

Fool's Paradise is a 2006 album recorded by The Head Cat, a collaboration between Lemmy of Motörhead, Slim Jim Phantom (of The Stray Cats), and Danny B. Harvey. It features covers of mostly classic 1950s songs. It is a re-release of their first album "Lemmy, Slim Jim & Danny B" recorded in September 1999. This re-release doesn't include 3 songs from the original release, it has a different cover and the track list is in a different order.

While there is nothing groundbreaking in this recording, the 1950s songs that are chosen (penned by likes of Buddy Holly and members of his group) are played "commendably", keeping close to the original versions with restraint. The album received less praise from other critics.

== Critical reception ==
Professional ratings
Review scores
| Source | Rating |
|---|---|
| Allmusic | 3.5/5 stars |

Greg Prato of Allmusic refers to the album as "a much needed antidote to the computer/software enhanced state of popular music" and "a worthwhile listen for die-hard fans to hear Lemmy tackle covers of some of his favorite standards". Bob Gottlieb wrote in Folk & Acoustic Music Exchange that the band "play some damn good music" and that the songs are "not filled with the fireball frenetic energy that can often make Rockabilly about as pleasant as the sound of a dentists drill nowadays". However, Paul Jordan Sr. wrote the album "sounds like karaoke from a biker's bar! Bad songs sung by bad voices".

== Track listing ==
| No. | Title | Writer(s) | Original artist (date) | Length |
|---|---|---|---|---|
| 1. | "Fool's Paradise" | Sonny Le Claire, Horace Linsley, Norman Petty | Buddy Holly (1965) | 2:29 |
| 2. | "Tell Me How" | Buddy Holly, Norman Petty, Jerry Allison | The Crickets (1957) | 1:50 |
| 3. | "You Got Me Dizzy" | Jimmy Reed | (1958) | 3:00 |
| 4. | "Not Fade Away" | Buddy Holly, Norman Petty | The Crickets (1957) | 2:16 |
| 5. | "Cut Across Shorty" | Marijohn Wilkin, Wayne P. Walker | Eddie Cochran (1957) | 2:04 |
| 6. | "Lawdy Miss Clawdy" | Lloyd Price | (1952) | 2:01 |
| 7. | "Take Your Time" | Buddy Holly, Norman Petty | Buddy Holly (1958) | 2:03 |
| 8. | "Well...All Right" | Buddy Holly, Jerry Allison, Norman Petty, Joe B. Mauldin | Buddy Holly (1958) | 2:19 |
| 9. | "Tryin' to Get to You" | Rose Marie McCoy, Charles Singleton | | 2:19 |
| 10. | "Learning the Game" | Buddy Holly | (1960) | 2:17 |
| 11. | "Peggy Sue Got Married" | Buddy Holly | (1959) | 2:15 |
| 12. | "Crying, Waiting, Hoping" | Buddy Holly | (1959) | 2:13 |
| 13. | "Love's Made a Fool of You" | Buddy Holly | The Crickets (1959) | 1:57 |
| 14. | "Big River" | Johnny Cash | (1958) | 2:28 |
| 15. | "Matchbox" | Carl Perkins | (1957) | 2:31 |

== Personnel ==
- Danny B.Harvey - guitar, keyboards, background vocals
- Lemmy Kilmister - lead vocals, bass guitar, acoustic guitar, harmonica
- Slim Jim Phantom - drums, percussion, background vocals
