= Escalator (album) =

Studio album by Sam Gopal
- Released: January 1969
- Recorded: De Lane Lea 10 Oct – 26 Nov 1968; Morgan Sound 10, 12 & 15 Nov 1968
- Genre: Psychedelic rock
- Label: Stable Records SLE 80001
- Producer: Trevor Walters

Professional ratings
Review scores
Source	Rating
Julian Cope	(No rating)

Escalator is the only studio album by the English psychedelic rock band Sam Gopal released in 1969, on the small Stable Records label. The band recorded "Horse" and a Willie Dixon cover "Back Door Man", which survive on acetate, and appear on the re-released album as bonus tracks. Ian Kilmister, later known as Lemmy, had joined the band after playing in the Rockin' Vickers and is credited as "Ian Willis", as he was considering changing his surname to that of his stepfather George Willis.

== Track listing ==
All tracks are written by the band except where indicated.

Side A
No.	Title	Length
1.	"Cold Embrace"	3:20
2.	"The Dark Lord"	3:40
3.	"The Sky is Burning" (Ian Willis)	2:30
4.	"You're Alone Now"	3:41
5.	"Grass" (Ian Willis)	4:03
6.	"It's Only Love" (Ian Willis)	4:18

Side B
No.	Title	Length
7.	"Escalator" (Ian Willis)	2:49
8.	"Angry Faces" (Leo Davidson)	4:03
9.	"Midsummer Night's Dream"	2:14
10.	"Season of the Witch" (Donovan)	4:27
11.	"Yesterlove" (Ian Willis)	4:55

Bonus tracks
No.	Title	Length
12.	"Horse"	3:33
13.	"Back Door Man" (Willie Dixon)	3:06

== Personnel ==
- Sam Gopal – tabla, percussion; drums on "Season of the Witch" and "Midsummer Night's Dream"
- "Ian Willis" (Lemmy) – vocals, lead and rhythm guitar
- Roger D'Elia – lead and rhythm guitar, acoustic guitar on "Yesterlove"
- Phil Duke – bass guitar
