= BBC Radio 1 Live in Concert (Hawkwind album) =

1991 live album by Hawkwind

BBC Radio One Live in Concert

Live album (rarities) by Hawkwind
- Released: 1991
- Recorded: 28 September 1972, Paris Theatre
- Genre: Space rock
- Length: 59:50
- Label: Windsong International
- Producer: Jeff Griffin

Hawkwind chronology
Out & Intake (1987)	BBC Radio One Live in Concert (1991)	The Friday Rock Show Sessions (1992)

Professional ratings
Review scores
Source	Rating
AllMusic	4/5 stars
The Encyclopedia of Popular Music	3/5 stars

BBC Radio One Live in Concert is a 1991 live album of a 1972 concert by Hawkwind.

Jeff Griffin, the producer of the BBC in Concert series producer, said that "It was recorded straight to quarter-inch tape – there were no overdubs and no possibility of remixing." He noted that it was a continuous one-hour performance.

Despite Griffin's claims that remixing was not possible, the broadcast version sounds markedly different from the CD release, having greater clarity and definition on the instruments and vocals. The broadcast version also has some significant edits, including removing the first 4 minutes of "Brainstorm".

In March 2010, EMI reissued the concert as Hawkwind: At the BBC – 1972 as a double CD. The first CD contains the original version released by Windsong, along with a studio session recorded for the Johnnie Walker show in August 1972, with performances of "Silver Machine" and "Brainstorm". The second CD contains the version used by the BBC for broadcast.

This recording is still regularly aired by BBC Radio 6 Music on the Live at Midnight slot.

== Track listing ==
=== BBC Radio 1 Live in Concert ===
1. "Countdown" [unlisted] (Dunkley) – 1:00
  "Born To Go" (Calvert/Brock) – 11:15
  "Black Corridor" [unlisted] (Moorcock) – 2:30
2. "Seven by Seven" (Brock) – 7:05
3. "Brainstorm" (Turner) – 10:38
4. "Electronic No 1" [unlisted] (Dik Mik/Dettmar) – 2:30
  "Master of the Universe" (Turner/Brock) – 7:22
5. "Paranoia" (Hawkwind) – 5:55
  "Earth Calling" [unlisted] (Calvert) – 3:29
6. "Silver Machine" (Calvert/Brock) – 4:45
  "Welcome to the Future" [unlisted] (Calvert) – – 3:03
  "Credits" [unlisted] (Dunkley)

=== At the BBC 1972 Disk 1: Mono ===
1. "Brainstorm" [Johnnie Walker Radio 1 Session] – 5:28
2. "Silver Machine" [Johnnie Walker Radio 1 Session] – 3:50
3. "Countdown" – 0:55
4. "Born to Go" – 11:23
5. "The Black Corridor" – 2:23
6. "Seven by Seven" – 7:05
7. "Brainstorm" – 10:15
8. "Electronic No. 1" – 2:41
9. "Master of the Universe" – 7:28
10. "Paranoia" – 5:55
11. "Earth Calling" – 3:02
12. "Silver Machine" – 5:09
13. "Welcome to the Future" – 3:10

=== At the BBC 1972 Disc 2: Stereo ===
1. "Countdown" – 1:08
2. "Born to Go" – 11:19
3. "The Black Corridor" – 2:25
4. "Seven by Seven" – 7:06
5. "Brainstorm" – 6:12
6. "Electronic No. 1" – 2:03
7. "Master of the Universe" – 7:29
8. "Paranoia" – 5:55
9. "Earth Calling" – 3:02
10. "Silver Machine" – 5:10
11. "Welcome to the Future" – 2:52

== Personnel ==
- Dave Brock – guitar, vocals
- Nik Turner – saxophone, flute, vocals
- Lemmy – bass guitar, vocals
- Dik Mik Davies – synthesizer
- Del Dettmar – synthesizer
- Simon King – drums
- Stacia – announcements
- Andy Dunkley – announcements

== Credits ==
- Recorded: 28 September 1972, Paris Theatre, London
- Broadcast: 14 October 1972, BBC Radio 1 In Concert
- Producer: Jeff Griffin
- Engineer: Chris Lycett

== Charts ==
Chart (2020)	Peak position
UK Rock & Metal Albums (Official Charts)	20

== Release history ==
- October 1991: Windsong, WINCD007, UK
- September 1991: Genschman, GENSCH1002, Germany – titled Space Rock From London (broadcast version)
- December 1994: Live Storm, LSCD51626, Italy – titled Space London 1972 (broadcast version)
- 15 March 2010: EMI, HAWKS7, UK
