= Lemmy (film) =

- Directed by: Greg Olliver; Wes Orshoski
- Produced by: Greg Olliver; Wes Orshoski
- Starring: Lemmy
- Production companies: Damage Case Films & Distribution; Three Count Films; Secret Weapon Films
- Distributed by: E1 Entertainment
- Release date: 15 March 2010 (SXSW)
- Running time: 116 minutes
- Countries: United States, United Kingdom
- Language: English

Lemmy: 49% motherfucker. 51% son of a bitch. is a 2010 documentary film profile of the English rock musician Ian "Lemmy" Kilmister, the founder, bassist, and lead vocalist of the heavy metal band Motörhead.

== Plot ==
Lemmy was directed and produced by Greg Olliver and Wes Orshoski and features interviews with friends, peers, and admirers such as Slash, Duff McKagan, Ozzy Osbourne, James Hetfield, Lars Ulrich, Robert Trujillo, Kirk Hammett, Nikki Sixx, David Ellefson, Scott Ian, Dave Vanian, Captain Sensible, Peter Hook, and Marky Ramone, as well as Nik Turner and Dave Brock of Lemmy's former band Hawkwind. The filmmakers were also able to capture many candid moments with colleagues such as Dave Grohl and Billy Bob Thornton conversing with Lemmy in bars and recording studios.

The film reveals that Lemmy spends much of his life either on tour with Motörhead or hanging out at the Rainbow Bar and Grill in Los Angeles, with well-known musicians such as Sixx joking that they bump into Lemmy every single time they go to the Rainbow. Lemmy is shown living alone in a small rent-controlled apartment, which he refuses to give up due to its cheap rent relative to other places in Los Angeles and its close proximity to the Rainbow. He reveals that he has never married and is close to his son, Paul, a guitarist who occasionally joins him on stage. The film also notes Lemmy's extensive WWII memorabilia collection, and his hobby of playing gambling machines.

== Production ==
The film includes footage shot in countries such as the United States, United Kingdom, Germany, Finland, Norway, Sweden, Denmark, and Russia. Footage was shot over three years on a combination of 16 mm film and HD video. Producing the film took nearly five years.

== Release ==
Lemmy premiered in March 2010 at the South by Southwest film festival in Austin, Texas. It was then screened at film festivals in Canada, Australia, Mexico, South Korea, Greece, Chile, Brazil, Spain, France, and elsewhere. The film was released theatrically in the UK in December 2010, and in the U.S. in January and February 2011. It was released on DVD, Blu-ray and digital download in the U.S. in March 2011. The U.S. version of the film is considered the definitive version, as the Blu-ray version includes more than 4 hours of extra footage, and the double-DVD release features more than three hours of bonus features, including more than 30 minutes of Lemmy jamming with Metallica. Lemmy was first screened in the UK at the London Film Festival on 23 October 2010. Entertainment One released the DVD on 24 January 2011 in the UK.

== Reception ==
On Rotten Tomatoes the film holds an 83% rating based on reviews from 24 critics. NME's Hamish MacBain gave Lemmy a positive review (8 out of 10) and noted that "[h]earing him roar the words to 'Rock It' alone is reason enough to watch this movie". The review by The Hollywood Reporter found the film's content "entertaining enough, to convey the subject's appeal to audiences beyond the metal crowd." After the film's world premiere, Wired magazine wrote that the film "mines pure gold" and Marc Savlov of The Austin Chronicle wrote, "What's in a name? Lemmy, Greg Olliver and Wes Orshoski's portrait of Motorhead founder Lemmy Kilmister, is one of the most thorough and entertaining rock and roll documentaries since Ondi Timoner's Dig! Like its subject, it's by turns philosophical, brash, and thoroughly kickass." A review at CinemaFunk explains that the film is "relatively straight forward and does not have aesthetic choices beyond shooting the damn thing, portraying it, and moving on" and that there "is no better way to explain Lemmy's own ideologies". Reviewing the film for Twitchfilm.net, Brandon Tenold said that while it wasn't an all-time classic like Woodstock or Gimme Shelter, it was still "an affectionate and fun snapshot of one of rock n' roll's most distinctive and enduring figures".

== Certifications ==
Country	Certification	Sales/shipments
Germany	Gold	25,000
United States	Gold	50,000
United Kingdom	Gold	25,000
