= Heavy Metal Kids =

British heavy metal band

- Origin: London, England
- Genres: Rock, glam rock, hard rock, heavy metal.
- Years active: 1972–1985, 2002–present
- Labels: Apple, Parlophone, RAK, Capitol, Columbia (US and Canada), EMI, MPL, Hear Music, MLP
- Members: Keith Boyce; Cosmo Verrico; PJ Phillips; Simon Gordon; Andy Fuller
- Past members: Gary Holton; Mickey Waller; Danny Peyronel; John Sinclair; Barry Paul; Jay Williams; Marco Barusso; Marco Guarnerio; Matteo Salvadori; John Altman; Phil Lewis; Ricky Squires; Ronnie Thomas; Ronnie Garrity; Justin McConville; Paul Manzi

Heavy Metal Kids are a British rock band formed in London in 1972 by the merger of two previous bands, Heaven and Biggles. Their music combined hard rock and glam rock influences, and they were known for energetic live performances and frontman Gary Holton’s charisma.

They released several albums during the 1970s, building a small following, despite never achieving commercial success.

== History ==
The band took their name from a gang of street kids featured in William S. Burroughs’ novel Nova Express.

=== Early years (1973–1985) ===
The initial, pre-recording line-up consisted of Mickey Waller (guitar), Ronnie Thomas (bass, backing vocals), Gary Holton (lead vocals), Keith Boyce (drums) and Cosmo (guitar). They were the first signing by Atlantic Records' new London offices, having been spotted by their A&R man, Dave Dee. In 1973, they were joined by keyboard player Danny Peyronel. In January 1974, they recorded their first, self-titled album, at the Olympic Studios, produced by Dave Dee and engineered by Phil Chapman.

Waller left the band shortly before they went in to Island's Basing Street Studios, to record the follow-up album Anvil Chorus, in January 1975, which was produced by Andy Johns. At this point Danny Peyronel left to join UFO and was replaced by John Sinclair. Shortly after, Cosmo was replaced by Barry Paul, and the band moved to Mickie Most's RAK Records where they recorded Kitsch, in the Château du Regard, northern France. The record was produced by Most.

John Sinclair left to join Uriah Heep and was replaced by Jay Williams.

Keith Boyce left and was replaced by Ricky Squires, previously of the dEAd ENd KIdS.

=== Reunion (2002–present) ===
After Holton's death in 1985, the band went into a long hiatus until, in 2002, they recorded a new album, Hit the Right Button, released in 2003 and featuring Peyronel, now on lead vocals and keyboards, Ronnie Thomas, Keith Boyce, Marco Barusso (guitars, backing vocals) and Marco Guarnerio (guitars, backing vocals). The album was produced by Barusso.

Hit The Right Button enjoyed critical success. The 'twentieth century' Heavy Metal Kids embarked on a series of tours of the UK and Europe. In early 2008, a 'special edition' of the album was released by Angel Air Records. Under the name Hit The Right Button Plus, the CD featured four of their songs performed live in London and Milan between 2003 and 2005 as bonus tracks, as well as fully re-designed artwork.

In October 2008, and now featuring Matteo Salvadori replacing Guarnerio, Heavy Metal Kids went into Massive Arts Studio in Milan, where initial recordings were made. Barusso worked for nearly two years with Salvadori and Peyronel trying to finish the album but it was never completed.

On 8 August 2010, Peyronel left the band and, shortly after this, the actor John Altman was unveiled as the new lead singer. Altman was a friend of the original frontman, Holton, and he appeared with him in Quadrophenia.

In October 2010, Heavy Metal Kids embarked on a tour with the new line-up featuring John Altman (lead vocals), Ronnie Thomas (bass, backing vocals), Cosmo (guitar), Keith Boyce (drums) and Justin McConville (guitar, keyboards, backing vocals). They have been working on their album to be titled 'Uncontrollable!'. A single of the same title has been released.

In early 2011, John Altman announced he was leaving the band to focus on his other commitments. L.A. Guns frontman Phil Lewis joined the band for a couple of gigs and would return to the band for some performances later in the year. The band then performed as a four-piece with Justin McConville taking on lead vocal duties.

In October 2011, Ronnie Thomas appeared in the Identity Parade round of Never Mind the Buzzcocks, preceded by video clip of the Top of the Pops recording of "She's No Angel". In 2012, Thomas left the band and was replaced by Ronnie Garrity until August 2015 when PJ Phillips was recruited for bass and backing vocal duties.

== Members ==
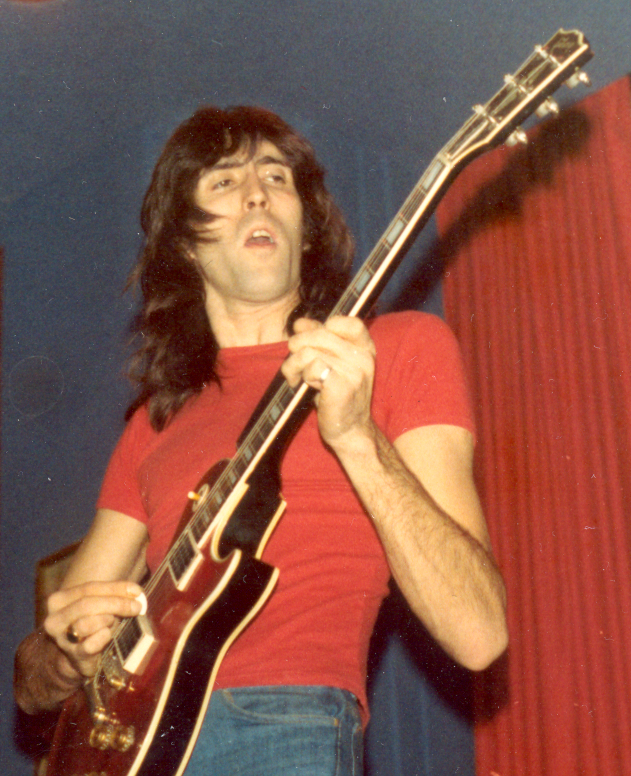
Mickey Waller

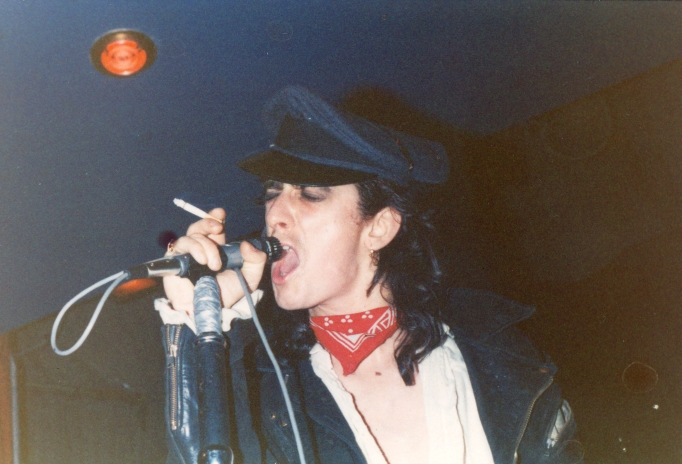
Gary Holton

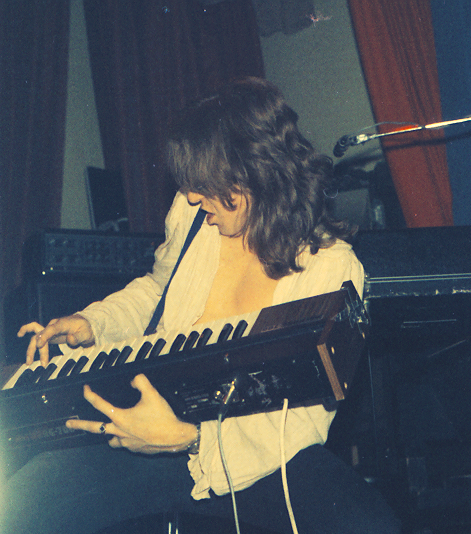
Danny Peyronel

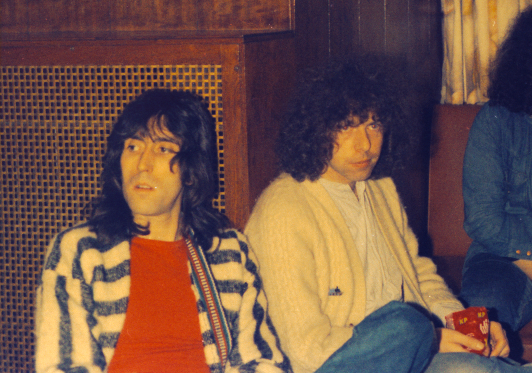
Mickey Waller & Ronnie Thomas

=== Current members ===
- Keith Boyce – drums (1973–1978, 1982–1985, 2002–present)
- Cosimo "Cosmo" Verrico – guitar (1974–1975, 2010–present)
- PJ Phillips – bass guitar, backing vocals (2015–2019, 2021–present)
- Simon Gordon – lead vocals (2022–present)
- Andy Fuller – keyboards (2022–present)

=== Former members ===
- Gary Holton – lead vocals (1972–1978, 1983–1985; his death)
- Mickey Waller – guitars (1972–1974; died 2013)
- Ronnie Thomas – bass guitar, backing vocals (1972–1978, 1983–1985, 2002–2011)
- Danny Peyronel – keyboards, lead and backing vocals (1973–1975, 2002–2010)
- Barry Paul – lead and rhythm guitar, backing vocals (1975–1978, 1983–1985)
- John Sinclair – keyboards, backing vocals (1975–1976)
- Jay Williams – lead guitar (1976–1978, 1983–1985)
- Ricky Squires – drums (1983–1985)
- Marco Guarnerio – rhythm guitar, backing vocals (2002–2010)
- Marco Barusso – lead guitar, backing vocals (2002–2010)
- John Altman – lead vocals (2010)
- Phil Lewis – lead vocals (2010–2011)
- Ronnie Garrity – bass guitar, backing vocals (2012–2015)
- Justin McConville – rhythm guitar, bass guitar, lead and backing vocals (2010–2019)
- Paul Manzi – lead vocals (2015–2016, 2020–2021)

== Discography ==
- Heavy Metal Kids (1974)
- Anvil Chorus (1975)
- Kitsch (1976)
- Chelsea Kids (1987)
- Live and Loud !! (1988)
- Hit the Right Button (2003)
- By Appointment... Best of the Old Bollocks (2004)
- Delirious, Classic Kids Capers (DVD) 2006
- Heavy Metal Kids with Phil Lewis Live at Camden Underworld (DVD) 2011

== Bibliography ==
- York, W, (1982). Who's Who In Rock, Arthur Barker, Ltd.
- Jasper, T & Oliver, D, (1983). The International Encyclopedia of Hard Rock and Heavy Metal, Sidgwick and Jackson, Ltd. ISBN 978-0283061028
- Van den Heuvel, J A, (1990). Hard Rock and Heavy Metal Encyclopedia, Arcana Editrice, Srl.
- Popoff, M, (2005). UFO Shoot Out The Lights, Metal Blade, Inc. ISBN 978-0975280720
