= Sam Gopal =

British rock band

- Also known as: Sam Gopal's Dream; Cosmosis
- Origin: London, England
- Genre: Psychedelic rock
- Years active: 1966–1999
- Label: Stable Records
- Past members: Sam Gopal (tablas) with: Sam Gopal's Dream; Mick Hutchinson (guitar); Pete Sears (bass and keys); Andy Clark (keyboards and vocals); Sam Gopal Mk I Lemmy (guitar and vocals); Roger D'Elia (lead guitar); Phil Duke (bass); Sam Gopal Mk II; Alan Mark (vocals); Mox Gowland (harmonica and flutes); Mickey Finn (Waller) (guitar); Freddie Gandy (bass)
- Website: samgopal.com

Sam Gopal (originally known as Sam Gopal's Dream) were an underground British psychedelic rock band that formed in 1966 and released their first album, Escalator, in 1969.

== History ==
=== Original line-up (Sam Gopal's Dream) ===
The band was formed under the name Sam Gopal's Dream, named after its founder, Sam Gopal. Born in Malaysia and coming to England in 1962 to study music, Gopal played tabla, a northern Indian percussion instrument, from the age of seven, which replaced drums in the band. The band's first line-up was Sam Gopal on tabla, Mick Hutchinson on guitar, Pete Sears on bass guitar and keys, and (towards the end) Andy Clark on vocals and keyboards.

For most of 1967, Sam Gopal's Dream was an instrumental trio and played at the UFO Club (their first show), The Electric Garden in Covent Garden (later to become Middle Earth), The Roundhouse, and Happening 44. In April 1967, the band performed at The 14 Hour Technicolor Dream, a UK Underground event organised by the International Times at Alexandra Palace. Other performing bands included Pink Floyd, The Pretty Things, Savoy Brown, The Crazy World of Arthur Brown, Soft Machine and The Move. In December of the same year, they played Christmas on Earth Continued at Kensington Olympia in London, alongside bands such as Jimi Hendrix, The Who, and Pink Floyd. Jimi Hendrix later sat in with the original Sam Gopal's Dream at London's Speakeasy Club.

In 1967, some of the band's first recordings were engineered by Gus Dudgeon, who had previously worked with acts such as The Zombies and John Mayall, and would later go on to work with acts such as David Bowie and Elton John. In 1968, Clark, Hutchinson, and Sears teamed up with Viv Prince on drums, under the name Vamp ("Viv, Andy, Mick, and Pete"), releasing a single called "Floatin" on Atlantic Records. They also recorded another track which featured Gopal on tabla, but its location is unknown.

This original line-up broke up in 1968. Sears went on to session work and formed his own band with Prince, called Giant. Hutchinson and Clark recorded three albums together as Clark-Hutchinson.

=== Second line-up and Escalator ===
In the same year as the previous break-up, Gopal formed a new line-up under his name, which included vocalist-guitarist Ian Fraser Kilmister (better known as Lemmy, who had just finished working as a roadie on a tour featuring Jimi Hendrix and Pink Floyd), Roger D'Elia and Phil Duke. Under this new line-up, the band were managed by Robert Stigwood, also the manager of Cream. Their album Escalator was recorded in late 1968 and released in January 1969, on Stable Records. According to Lemmy, the majority of the album was composed by him over the course of one night. Subsequently, the band also released the single "Horse", with a B-side cover of "Back Door Man" by Willie Dixon.

Formerly of the Rockin' Vickers, Lemmy went on to be the bassist of Hawkwind and, in 1975, the founder, singer and bassist of Motörhead. Roger D'Elia (who was grandson of the actress Mary Clare) later performed in a mid-1970s band called Glider, which included Twink (ex-Fairies), Andy Colquhoun and Chas McKay.

=== Additional line-up changes and albums ===
A further line-up of the band (under the name Cosmosis) featured Alan Mark (vocals), Mox Gowland (harmonica & flutes), Mickey Waller (also known as Mickey Finn; guitar) and Freddie Gandy (ex-The Fairies; bass), with management from Led Zeppelin manager Peter Grant; however, this lineup did not release any records before breaking up in 1971, partially due to Gopal himself being incapacitated for several years by a car accident.

Sam Gopal then recorded multiple further albums with professional musicians in the band's lineup (including Building B, Largo, Soap Opera (with Andy Clark), and Not for Sale); however, they remain unreleased. Gopal himself was also involved with additional side projects, such as a trio with Didier Malherbe (saxophone) and Patrice Lemoine (piano), a band named Sangit (who recorded a live album at the Berlin Philharmonie Kammermusiksaal and a soundtrack for the Channel 4 documentary series The Great Moghuls), and Brain Tonic (who recorded the album Blind Man's Movie).

In 1999, Sam Gopal self-published another album, Father Mucker (GPS CD 001, Munchen, Germany). Songs from that album were recorded in 1990 (many with Andy Clark) but not mixed and overdubbed until 1999, in which year he also recorded one additional song for the album.

== Discography ==
=== Albums ===
- Escalator (recorded 1968, released 1969, Morgan Blue Town reissue 2017)
- Father Mucker (recorded 1990, released 1999)

=== Singles and EPs ===
- "Escalator" / "Angry Faces" / "Cold Embrace" / "The Sky Is Burning" (promo 1968)
- "Horse" / "Backdoor Man" (1969, only acetates exist)
