= The Friday Rock Show Sessions =

Live album by Hawkwind
- Released: 10 February 1992
- Recorded: Reading Festival, 24 August 1986
- Genres: Space rock, Psychedelic rock
- Label: Raw Fruit

Hawkwind chronology
BBC Radio 1 Live In Concert (1991)	The Friday Rock Show Sessions (1992)	Hawklords Live (1992)

Professional ratings
Review scores
Source	Rating
Allmusic	3/5 stars
The Encyclopedia of Popular Music	2/5 stars

The Friday Rock Show Sessions is a 1992 live album release of Hawkwind's headline set at the Reading Festival, 24 August 1986.

The set was recorded by the BBC and transmitted soon after on Tommy Vance's Friday Rock Show. The broadcast excluded performances of "Paradox", "Shade Gate", "Choose Your Masks" and "Moonglum". This album was released as per the broadcast.

== Track listing ==
1. "Magnu" (Brock)
  "Angels of Death" (Brock)
2. "Pulsing Cavern" (Bainbridge/Davey)
3. "Assault and Battery" (Brock)
4. "Needle Gun" (Brock)
5. "Master of the Universe" (Turner/Brock)
6. "Arrival in Utopia" [listed as "Utopia"] (Moorcock/Brock)
7. "Brainstorm" [unlisted] (Turner)
  "Dream Worker" (Bainbridge)
  "Dust Of Time" [unlisted] (Brock/Bainbridge/Lloyd-Langton)
8. "Assassins Of Allah" [aka "Hassan-i-Sabah"] (Calvert/Rudolph)
9. "Silver Machine" (Calvert/Brock) / "Paranoia" [unlisted] (Brock)

Note: The banding of tracks together on CD would suggest either medleys or interpolations, but they are in fact segues, with the exception of "Paranoia" which interpolates "Silver Machine".

== Personnel ==
- Dave Brock - guitar, keyboards, vocals
- Huw Lloyd-Langton - guitar, vocals
- Harvey Bainbridge - Keyboards, vocals
- Alan Davey - bass guitar, Vocals
- Danny Thompson - drums

with

- Lemmy - bass guitar, vocals ("Silver Machine")
- Dumpy Dunnell - guitar ("Silver Machine")

== Release history ==
- March 1992: Raw Fruit, FRSCD005
