= The Head Cat =

American rock band

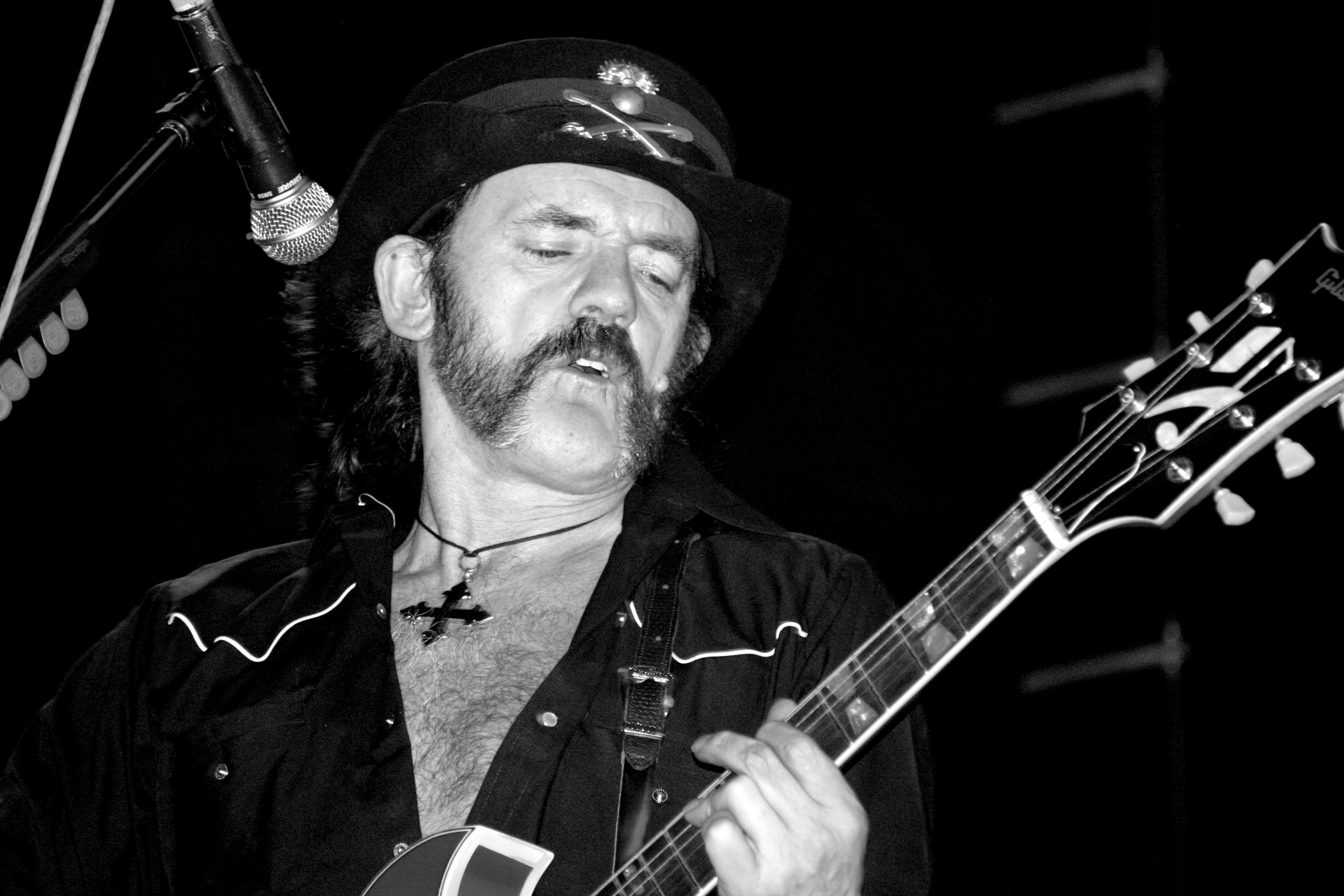
- Lemmy Kilmister in Mexico City

Background information
- Origin: United States
- Genres: Rockabilly; jump blues; rock and roll
- Years active: 1999–present
- Label: Cleopatra Records
- Members: Slim Jim Phantom; Danny B. Harvey; David Vincent
- Past members: Lemmy Kilmister

The Head Cat is an American rockabilly supergroup formed by vocalist/bassist Lemmy (of Motörhead), drummer Slim Jim Phantom (of the Stray Cats) and guitarist Danny B. Harvey (of Lonesome Spurs and the Rockats). Lemmy died in 2015 and as of 2017, former Morbid Angel member David Vincent took Lemmy's place as vocalist and bassist.

== History ==
The Head Cat was formed after recording the Elvis Presley tribute album by Swing Cats A Special Tribute to Elvis in July 1999 to which the future bandmates all contributed. After recordings were finished they stayed at the studio and Lemmy picked up an acoustic guitar and started playing some of his old favorite songs by Johnny Cash, Buddy Holly, and Eddie Cochran. The rest of the guys knew them all and joined in. The name of the band was created by combining the names Motörhead, the Stray Cats, the Rockats, and 13 Cats, which resulted in the Head Cat, a similar abbreviation to Headgirl, a collaboration between Motörhead and Girlschool.

In 2006, the band released their first studio album on June 27, Fool's Paradise, which was a re-release of an earlier album titled Lemmy, Slim Jim & Danny B recorded in September 1999, even though Fool's Paradise does not include three songs from the first release and the track list is in a different order. It included cover songs from artists such as Buddy Holly, Carl Perkins, Jimmy Reed, T-Bone Walker, Lloyd Price, Elvis Presley, and Johnny Cash. On the recordings, Lemmy played acoustic guitar in live performances too including Rockin' The Cat Club, the only live album the band had. In later years, Lemmy began to use his signature Rickenbacker bass in live performances, saying "I'm just not that good on guitar". Before that re-release, a DVD of a live performance was released on April 25, 2006. The album was recorded on January 13, 2004, and was released in 2006 on limited vinyl 322 copies too. It was filmed at the Phantom's Cat Club on the Sunset Strip in Los Angeles and included 13 live songs and interviews with the band.

The band's second studio album (or third altogether), Walk the Walk...Talk the Talk, was recorded by the Niji Entertainment Group in June 2010, released in 2011. This was the first new material by the band in eleven years, following up from the Lemmy, Slim Jim & Danny B album in 1999. It has two original songs "American Beat" and "The Eagle Flies on Friday". While the first album was all acoustic and the second album was half-acoustic, the third album (second studio) was all electric with Lemmy playing bass like in Motörhead.

In 2016, Cleopatra Records re-released Rockin' the Cat Club on vinyl with a different sleeve from the original release and for the first time on CD three-panel digipak.

A new variation of the band called Headcat 13 consisting of Harvey, Alan Davey on guitar, and Paul Vezelis (Frantic Flattops) on drums has released a self-titled album in 2020.

== Members ==
- David Vincent: bass, vocals
- Slim Jim Phantom: drums, percussion, vocals
- Danny B. Harvey: guitar, keyboard, double bass, backing vocals

=== Former members ===
- Lemmy Kilmister: vocals, bass, guitar, harmonica (1999–2015; his death)

== Discography ==
=== Albums ===
- Lemmy, Slim Jim & Danny B (Recorded September 1999, released in 2000)
- Rockin' the Cat Club: Live from the Sunset Strip (DVD + LP in 322 copies) (Recorded January 13, 2004, released in 2006)
- Fool's Paradise (2006)
- Walk the Walk...Talk the Talk (Recorded June 2010, Released in 2011)
- Rock 'N' Roll Riot On Sunset Strip (2016 re-release of Rockin' The Cat Club on vinyl and first time on CD with different sleeve)
- Headcat – Dreamcatcher: Live At Viejas Casino ( Recorded live 1st February 2008 at the Viejas Casino in Alpine, CA.)
- Live in Berlin (2023, BMG) (Recorded Live on October 11, 2011, at Huxley's, Berlin)

=== Singles ===
- "Tell Me How" // "Take Your Time" (No Balls Records / Cleopatra)
- The Head Cat / Lonesome Spurs: "Tell Me How", "Take Your Time" // "Lovesick", "Trouble" (No Balls Records)
- The Head Cat / Wanda Jackson: "Well Alright" // "Riot In Cell Block 9" (Muddy Roots Music)

=== Compilation albums ===
- Fool's Paradise + Rockin' The Cat Club (Cleopatra Records)
