= Mickey Finn (guitarist) =

English guitarist (1947–2013)

Mickey Waller
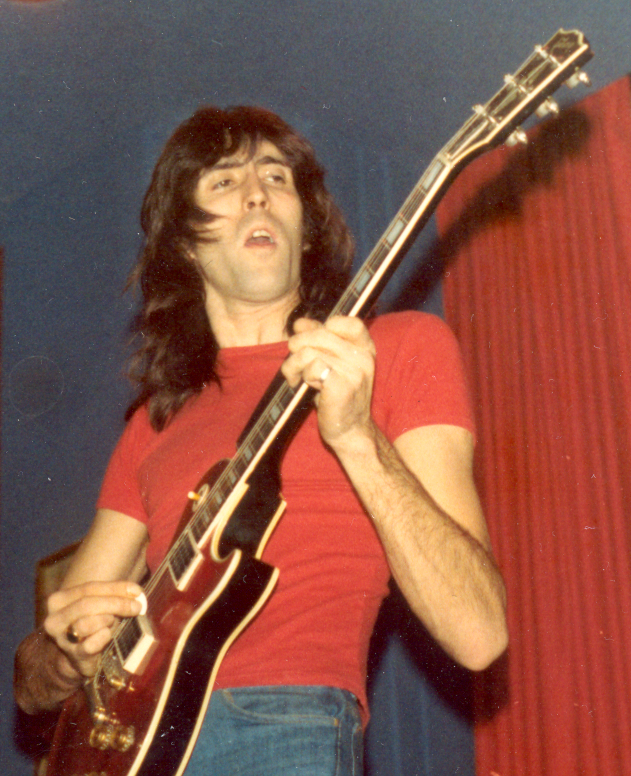
- Mickey Waller with Heavy Metal Kids in 1974

Background information
- Also known as: Mickey Finn
- Born: Michael F. Waller; 3 March 1947; Bethnal Green, London, England
- Died: 1 February 2013 (aged 65) Levallois-Perret, France
- Occupations: Guitarist
- Years active: 1961–2013
- Formerly of: The Heavy Metal Kids, Mickey Finn & the Blue Men

Michael F. Waller (3 March 1947 – 1 February 2013), also known by the stage name Mickey Finn, was an English guitarist.

== Biography ==
Michael F. Waller was born in Bethnal Green, East London, in 1947, and started out with instrumental band the Strangers in the summer of 1961. In 1963 Waller adopted the name Mickey Finn – after having heard about the drummer named Mickey Finn – and joined with John "Fluff" Cooke (keyboards), John Burkett (bass), Alan Marks (lead vocals) and Richard Brand (drums) to form "Mickey Finn & the Blue Men", who released their debut single in January 1964. Jimmy Page recorded with the band over the following months. With Burkett replaced by first Mick Stannard in early 1964 and then Rod Clark, the band were renamed "The Mickey Finn" in 1966. They released four more singles, the last of which, "Garden of My Mind", is their best known song and has become a cult favourite despite failing to chart at the time.

Reverting to his original name (percussionist Mickey Finn had by then become famous as a member of T.Rex), Waller played guitar with Sam Gopal (1969–70) and the Heavy Metal Kids (1972–74), before relocating to France and becoming a sought-after session musician, notably with Nino Ferrer. As Mickey Finn, he returned to the UK and joined Steve Marriott's All Stars in July 1975, and in May 1976 Finn and fellow All Star Greg Ridley (bass) formed The Fallen Angels with Twink (drums), Guy Humphries (guitar) and (initially) Bob Weston (guitar) and Keith Boyce (drums). The band crashed their van on the way to their first gig, and Finn was the only remaining original member when they re-emerged in July 1977 backing singer Phil May from The Pretty Things.

By 1999, Mickey Finn & the Blue Men had reformed and recorded the Black Hole album, followed by the Go Clean EP (Ten Minutes Productions, June 2004). From 2004 to 2011, Finn formed a blues-rock duet with Joane Calice (vocals/bass). He died in Paris on 1 February 2013.

== Discography ==
=== Mickey Finn and the Blue Men ===
- "Tom Hark" / "Please Love Me" (Blue Beat 203, January 1964)
- ""Pills" / "Hush Your Mouth" (Oriole CB 1927, March 1964)
- "Reelin' And A Rockin'" / "I Still Want You" (Oriole CB 1940, June 1964)
- "God Bless The Child" / "Ain't Necessarily So" (NB3 Recorded 1965) (released 1995)

=== The Mickey Finn ===
- "The Sporting Life" / "Night Comes Down" (as Mickey Finn) (Columbia DB 7510, March 1965)
- "I Do Love You" / "If I Had You Baby" (Polydor 56719, July 1966)
- "Garden of My Mind" / "Time To Start Loving You" (Direction 58-3086, December 1967)
- Garden Of My Mind, The Complete Recordings 1964–1967 (RPM Retro 972, 2015)

=== The Heavy Metal Kids ===
- The Heavy Metal Kids LP (Atlantic 1974)

=== Phil May and Fallen Angels ===
- Phil May & Fallen Angels LP (Philips 6410 969, 1978)

=== The Mickey Finn ===
- "Ain't Necessarily So" / "God Bless The Child" (Noiseburger, April 1995) (Originally recorded in 1965)

=== Mickey Finn and the Blue Men ===
- Black Hole LP (Ten Minutes Productions, 1999)
- Go Clean EP (Ten Minutes Productions, June 2004

=== Mickey Finn and Jo ===
- Lucky Like That LP (Ten Minutes Productions, 2010)
