= Doll Hut =

Music venue in Anaheim, California

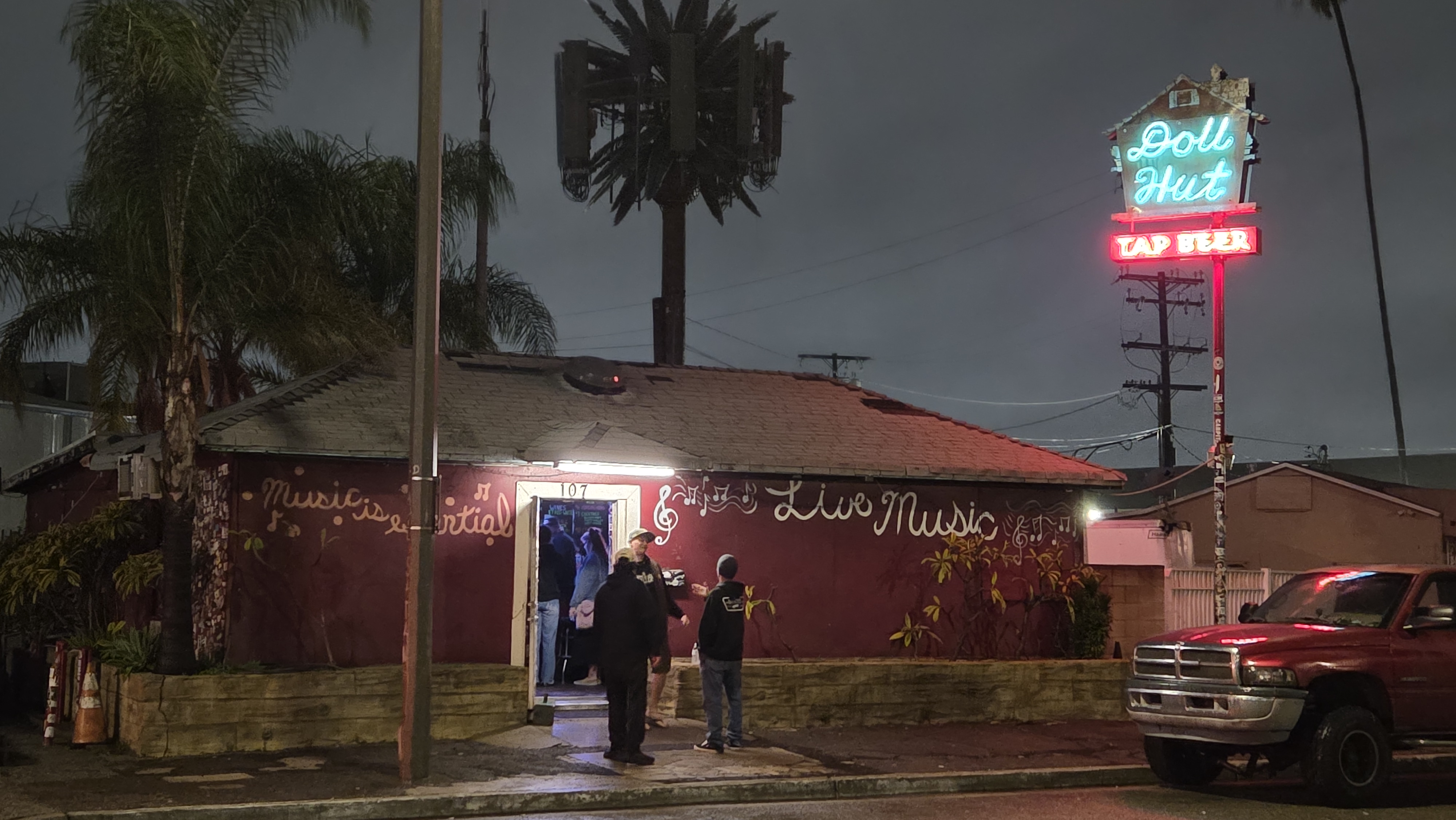
- Venue exterior
- Interactive map of Doll Hut
- Former names: Linda's Doll Hut (1989–2001)
- Address: 107 S Adams St. Anaheim, California; United States
- Coordinates: 33°49′51″N 117°55′56″W

Construction
- Built: c. 1922
- Opened: 1989; 37 years ago (as Linda's Doll Hut)

The Doll Hut is a music venue in Anaheim, California, United States. Operating since 1989, the venue is known as a mainstay for the Orange County punk rock scene, with several local acts such as The Offspring, Adolescents, and The Ziggens playing shows there prior to finding mainstream success.

With a maximum capacity of 89 people, the Doll Hut is known for its small size which creates an intimate atmosphere during shows, with "pushing and shoving and vocalists screaming lyrics only inches from patrons’ faces".

== Background ==
The Doll Hut is located in a roadhouse shack near Interstate 5 in Anaheim, California. The small venue has a maximum capacity of 89 occupants and previously held 49 before its pool tables were removed. The stage is a "low-rise corner wedge" and the walls of the interior are covered in band stickers and punk rock photos. The Doll Hut has a bar.

The Doll Hut is venerated for its long operating span despite its small size. Social Distortion lead vocalist Mike Ness told The Orange County Register that the venue became "a landmark for Orange County rock 'n' roll". Patronage at the venue peaked in the 1990s.

== History ==
The Doll Hut building, a small shack, was built around 1922. It formerly operated as a restaurant called Sunkist Cafe. Linda Jemison purchased the building in 1989 and converted it into a bar and music venue, intending it to be akin to the Whisky a Go Go nightclub in West Hollywood, California.

The venue first opened as Linda's Doll Hut and hosted various local rock acts. It gained notoriety among the Orange County punk rock scene for its rowdy shows performed by emerging bands. The Doll Hut's attendance declined, which contributed to Jemison's decision to sell it in 2001. Upon sale, it was renamed to the Doll Hut.

Subsequent owners made significant changes to the Doll Hut that represented a departure from its roots, such as a conversion to a Spanish language venue with the interior walls painted blue and orange. In 2007, owner Dirk Belling began the process of restoring the facility to its original look and punk rock programming.

In 2012, former de facto house band The Ziggens played the last show at the venue before its closure. It was converted into a short-lived Latin bar in 2013. In 2014, former Doll Hut show booker Michael McGarvey and his girlfriend Tammy Butler purchased the building and reopened it with its original format.

== Notable acts ==
- Adolescents
- Blink-182
- Brian Setzer
- The Dandy Warhols
- Jimmy Eat World
- The Offspring
- Sublime
- The Ziggens
