= Escalate (album) =

Studio album by Vlure
- Released: 26 September 2025
- Length: 44:55
- Label: Music for Nations
- Producer: Manni Dee; Conor Goldie

Singles from Escalate
- 1. "Feels Like Heaven" Released: 4 June 2025; 2. "Between Dreams" Released: 9 September 2025

Escalate is the debut studio album by Scottish band Vlure. It was released on 26 September 2025 via Music for Nations in LP, CD and digital formats.

== Background ==
The album was produced by Conor Goldie of the band, together with Manni Dee. "Feels Like Heaven" was released as a single on 4 June 2025, alongside a music video directed by Paris Seawell. It was followed by the second single, "Between Dreams", on 9 September 2025.

== Reception ==
Professional ratings
Review scores
Source	Rating
DIY	4/5 stars
Dork	5/5 stars
NME	5/5 stars

In a four-star review for DIY, Finlay Holden remarked, "Across 13 tracks, the record's pulse rises, falls, and distorts, occasionally testing its own stamina but never losing focus." Jake Hawkes, writing for Dork, noted, "On Escalate, they've turned up, absolutely flattened any expectations and proceeded to throw a party in the wreckage." Assigning the album a five-star score, Rishi Shah of NME described it as "an inspiring, brutally honest album that matches the lofty standards to which Vlure hold themselves."

== Track listing ==
Escalate track listing
No.	Title	Writer(s)	Length
1.	"I Want It Euphoric"	Connor Goldie; Niall Goldie; Hamish Hutcheson; Carlo Frederik Kriekaard; Alex Pearson	3:39
2.	"Something Real" (featuring Psweatpants)	C. Goldie; N. Goldie; Hutcheson; Kriekaard; Pearson; Payton Campbell	3:23
3.	"Heartbeat"	C. Goldie; N. Goldie; Hutcheson; Kriekaard; Pearson; Manni Dee	3:53
4.	"Between Dreams"	C. Goldie; N. Goldie; Hutcheson; Kriekaard; Pearson	3:34
5.	"Feels Like Heaven"	C. Goldie; N. Goldie; Hutcheson; Kriekaard; Pearson	3:16
6.	"Better Days"	C. Goldie; N. Goldie	3:38
7.	"Let It Escalate"	C. Goldie; N. Goldie; Hutcheson	2:46
8.	"Tha Gaol Agam Ort"	C. Goldie; N. Goldie; Hutcheson; Kriekaard; Pearson	4:26
9.	"Just Breathe" (featuring Gaïa Jeannot)	C. Goldie; Gaïa Jeannot	1:34
10.	"And for a Second"	C. Goldie; N. Goldie; Hutcheson; Kriekaard; Pearson	3:56
11.	"How to Say Goodbye"	C. Goldie; N. Goldie; Hutcheson; Kriekaard; Pearson	4:53
12.	"This Is Not the End"	C. Goldie; N. Goldie; Hutcheson; Kriekaard; Pearson; Kirsty McQueen	3:34
13.	"A Clear Tide" (featuring Bobby Gillespie)	C. Goldie	2:23
Total length:			44:55

== Personnel ==
Credits adapted from Tidal.

=== Vlure ===
- Conor Goldie – production (tracks 1–11, 13); programming, synthesizer (1–10, 13); drum machine (1–6), guitar (1–5, 7, 8, 10–12), vocals (1, 2, 6, 7, 12, 13), piano (1, 4, 5, 8, 10), arrangement (6, 9, 10, 13); additional studio production, keyboards (6)
- Niall Goldie – bass guitar (1–5, 7, 8, 10, 12), additional production (1), synthesizer (2, 3, 6); production, drum machine, programming (2, 6); additional studio production, arrangement, keyboards (6); piano (10)
- Hamish Hutcheson – vocals (1–5, 7, 8, 10–12)
- Carlo Frederik Kriekaard – drums (1, 3–5, 7–9, 11, 12), additional production (1, 2, 7); production, drum machine, programming, synthesizer (3, 11, 12); background vocals (12)
- Alex Pearson – background vocals (1, 3–5, 10, 11), vocals (2), synthesizer (3), theremin (12)

=== Additional contributors ===
- Manni Dee – production (1–5, 7, 8, 10, 11), programming (3), additional production (6)
- James Rand – mixing
- Matt Colton – mastering
- Taylor Brode – additional studio production
- Paul McInllay – additional engineering (1, 2, 4, 5, 7, 10–12)
- Psweatpants – vocals (2)
- Olivia McLean – cello (6, 9, 10)
- Gaïa Jeannot – vocals (9)
- Bobby Gillespie – vocals (13)

== Charts ==
Chart performance for Escalate
Chart (2025)	Peak position
Scottish Albums (Official Charts)	16
UK Dance Albums (Official Charts)	13
UK Physical Albums (OCC)	100
