= Future Reconstructions – Ritual of the Solstice =

Remix album by Hawkwind

Future Reconstructions - Ritual of the Solstice

Remix album by Hawkwind
- Released: 1996

Professional ratings
Review scores
Source	Rating
The Encyclopedia of Popular Music	3/5 stars

Future Reconstructions - Ritual Of The Solstice is a 1996 album featuring remixes of Hawkwind tracks.

== Track listing ==
=== CD ===
1. "Sonic Attack" – Knights Of The Occasional Table – 6:55
2. "Forge of Vulcan" – Optic Eye – 5:26
3. "Master of the Universe" – Salt Tank – 6:09
4. "Spirit of the Age (Flesh to Phantasy)" – Astralasia – 9:56
5. "You Shouldn't Do That" – Translucent – 4:59
6. "Sonic Destruction" – The Advent – 6:35
7. "Damnation Alley" – Zion Train – 7:15
8. "Uncle Sams on Mars" – Astralasia – 6:32
9. "Silver Machine" – Utah Saints – 7:13
10. "Needle Gun" – Doctor Jest (Haggis Of Sensor) – 3:57

=== vinyl ===
1. "Sonic Destruction" – The Advent
2. "You Shouldn't Do That" – Translucent
3. "Master Of The Universe" – Salt Tank
4. "Forge Of Vulcan" – Optic Eye
5. "Assassin" – Astralasia
6. "Damnation Alley" – Zion Train
7. "Silver Machine" – Utah Saints
8. "Sonic Attack" – The Knights Of The Occasional Table

== Release history ==
- 1996: CD and 2x12", Emergency Broadcast System Records, EBS117
