= Escalation hypothesis =

Theory in evolutionary biology

The Escalation Hypothesis is an evolutionary theory in biology put forward by Geerat J. Vermeij. It states that organisms are in constant conflict with one another and therefore devote many resources to thwarting the adaptations evolution brings to all competing organisms as time advances. This is in contrast to adaptations evolution may bring that are unrelated to competition with other organisms such as adapting to ecological niches based upon other factors such as geology and climate.

Vermeij's extensive work with the characteristics of marine gastropod fossils informed his development of thoughts on escalation. One prediction of the Escalation Hypothesis is that individual species having fewer adaptations that enable them to compete with other life forms are more likely to survive a mass extinction event such as one of The Big Five. This is because there is more flexibility to fit into new ecological niches that arduous adaptations such as heavy shells or energy consuming venom production would hinder.
