= The Rockin' Vickers =

British rock band

- Also known as: Rev Black and the Rockin' Vicars
- Origin: Blackpool, Lancashire, England
- Genres: Rock, rhythm and blues, beat
- Years active: 1963–1968
- Labels: Decca, CBS, RPM
- Members: (See members below)

The Rockin' Vickers were an English rock and roll band from Blackpool, active from 1963 to 1968. They toured the UK and continental Europe and released four singles during their existence. The band is however best-remembered for launching the career of Ian "Lemmy" Kilmister of Motörhead, then known as Ian Willis.

They were originally called Rev Black and the Rockin' Vicars, then abbreviated it to the Rockin' Vicars, but to get more gigs or even a chance at a record contract, they changed their name to "Rockin' Vickers". Their last single "Dandy", a cover of the Kinks song, was produced by Shel Talmy. "Dandy" was the band's sole hit, reaching number 10 on the Swedish Tio i Topp chart during December 1966.

== History ==
Formed in 1963, the band built their reputation as did many other beat groups of the era, by covering R&B and beat standards, but soon became known for their unusually intense live shows and outlandish stage costumes, dressing as vicars and Sami. Although mainly popular as a local act around Blackpool, England, the Vicars also toured mainland Europe, being one of the earliest British rock bands to perform in a communist state, when they played in Yugoslavia in the summer of 1965. They were particularly popular in Finland, where they recorded a single, a rocked up version of "Zing! Went the Strings of My Heart". They released four singles. The band split in 1968. Lemmy played guitar with the band (as he would with the next group that he joined, Sam Gopal) and did not take up the bass guitar until he joined Hawkwind in 1971.

In 1967, expatriate Blackpool musician Dave Rossall (ex-Bruce & the Spiders), carrying on the tradition of the English band, formed his own Australian band called Rev Black and the Rockin' Vicars (1967–1969). The Australian band went on to release four singles in its own right, toured extensively around Australia and made the Brisbane Top 40.

== Members ==
1963–1964	1964–1965	1965–1967
Harry "Reverend Black" Feeney – vocals; Ken Hardacre – guitar; Alex Hamilton – guitar; Peter Moorhouse – bass; Cyril "Ciggy" Shaw – drums	Harry "Reverend Black" Feeney – vocals; Nicholas Gribbon – guitar; Ian Holbrook – guitar/harmonica; Stephen "Mogsy" Morris – bass; Cyril "Ciggy" Shaw – drums	Harry "Reverend Black" Feeney – vocals; Ian "Lemmy" Kilmister – guitar; Garry Chamberlain- guitar; Stephen "Mogsy" Morris – bass; Cyril "Ciggy" Shaw – drums

== Discography ==
=== Singles ===
- "I Go Ape" b/w "Someone Like You", Decca F 11993, 1964, UK
- "Stella" b/w "Zing! Went the Strings of My Heart", Decca SD5662, 1965, Finland
- "Stella" b/w "Zing! Went the Strings of My Heart", 1966, Ireland
- "It's Alright (Townshend)" b/w "Stay By Me", CBS 202051, March 1966, UK
- "Dandy (Davies)" b/w "I Don't Need Your Kind", CBS 202241, October 1966, UK
- "Dandy (Davies)" b/w "I Don't Need Your Kind", Columbia 4-43818 1966, U.S.

=== Compilation albums ===
- Its Alright: The Complete Rockin' Vickers, RPM CD196 1995, UK

"I Go Ape" / "Someone Like Me" / "Zing Went The Strings Of My Heart" / "Stella" / "It's Alright" / "Stay By Me" / "Dandy" / "I Don't Need Your Kind Of Love" / "Baby Never Say Goodbye" / "I Just Stand There" / "Say Mama" / "Shake Rattle & Roll" / "What's the Matter Jane?" / "Little Rosy" (Ray Davies) (+ rehearsal extract)
