= Flogging Molly discography =

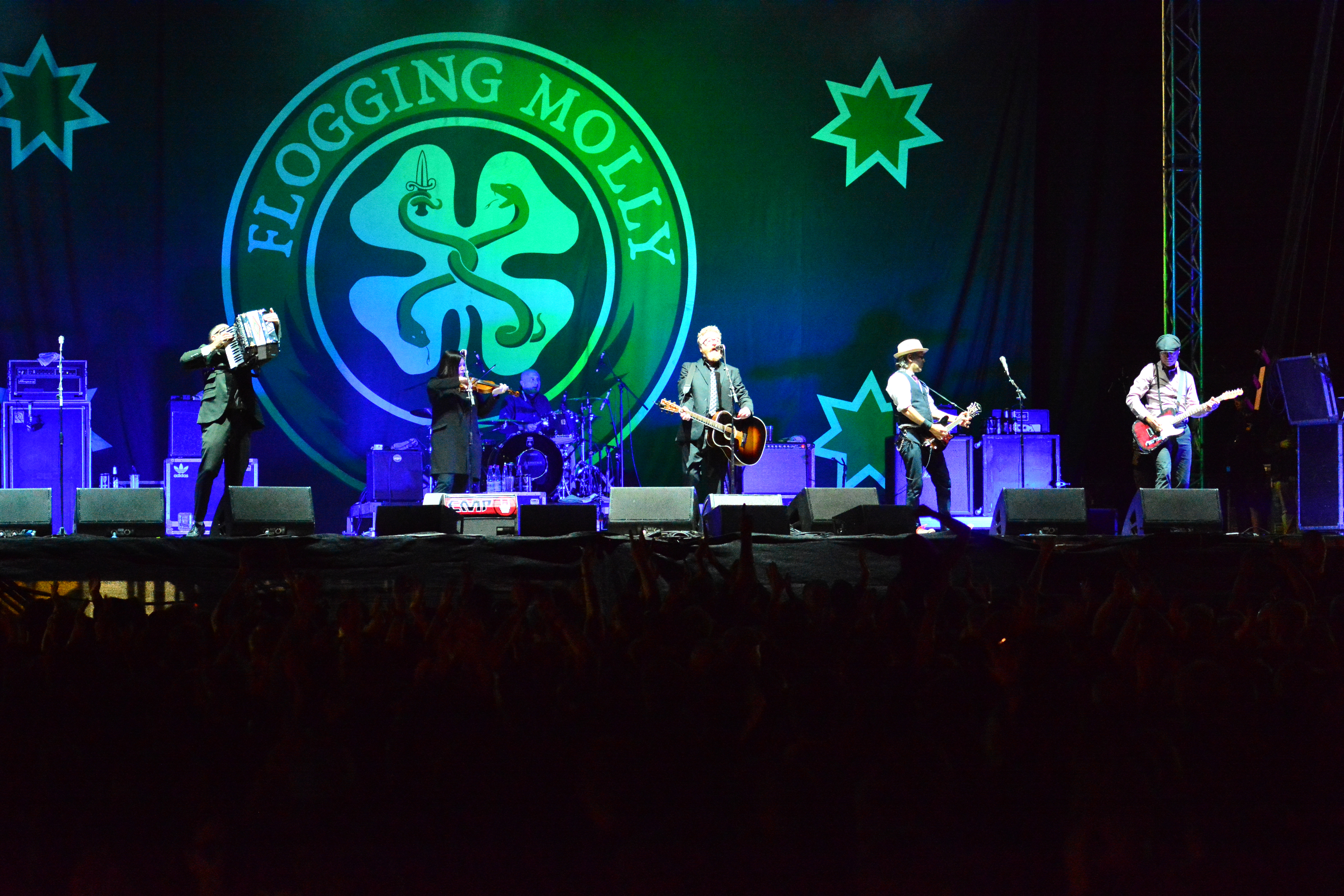
- Studio albums: 7
- Extended plays: 1
- Live albums: 3
- Singles: 15
- Music videos: 8

The discography of Flogging Molly, an Irish-American Celtic punk band, consists of seven studio albums, three live albums, one extended play, fifteen singles and eight music videos.

== Albums ==
=== Studio albums ===
List of studio albums, with selected chart positions
Title	Album details	Peak chart positions									
Title	Album details	US	US Ind.	AUT	BEL (FL)	FIN	GER	NLD	SWE	SWI	UK
Swagger	Released: March 7, 2000; Label: SideOneDummy; Formats: CD, LP, digital download	128	—	—	—	—	—	—	—	—	—
Drunken Lullabies	Released: March 19, 2002; Label: SideOneDummy; Formats: CD, LP, digital download	104	8	—	—	—	—	48	—	—	—
Within a Mile of Home	Released: September 14, 2004; Label: SideOneDummy; Formats: CD, LP, digital download	20	1	—	96	—	—	61	—	—	—
Float	Released: March 4, 2008; Label: SideOneDummy; Formats: CD, LP, digital download	4	1	27	81	26	45	37	36	91	—
Speed of Darkness	Released: May 31, 2011; Label: Borstal Beat; Formats: CD, LP, digital download	9	3	14	83	—	27	71	59	28	155
Life Is Good	Released: June 2, 2017; Label: Vanguard; Formats: CD, LP, digital download	69	—	33	75	—	40	—	—	27	—
Anthem	Released: September 9, 2022; Label: Rise; Formats: CD, LP, digital download	—	—	28	150	—	36	—	—	22	—
"—" denotes a recording that did not chart or was not released in that territory.

=== Live albums ===
List of live albums, with selected chart positions
Title	Album details	Peak chart positions				
Title	Album details	US	US Alt.	US Ind.	US Rock	NLD
Alive Behind the Green Door	Released: 1997; Label: SideOneDummy; Formats: CD	—	—	—	—	—
Whiskey on a Sunday	Released: July 25, 2006; Label: SideOneDummy; Formats: CD, digital download	67	—	3	24	45
Live at the Greek Theatre	Released: March 2, 2010; Label: SideOneDummy; Formats: CD, digital download	40	2	5	5	—
"—" denotes a recording that did not chart or was not released in that territory.

== Extended plays ==
List of extended plays
Title	EP details
Complete Control Sessions	Released: March 13, 2007; Label: SideOneDummy; Formats: Digital download

== Singles ==
List of singles, with selected chart positions, showing year released and album name
Title	Year	Peak chart positions	Album
Title	Year	US Alt.	Album
"Salty Dog"	2000	—	Swagger
"Drunken Lullabies"	2002	—	Drunken Lullabies
"The Seven Deadly Sins"	2004	—	Within a Mile of Home
"The Light of a Fading Star"	2005	—	Within a Mile of Home
"Requiem for a Dying Song"	2008	35	Float
"Float"	2008	40	Float
"The Lightning Storm"	2009	—	Float
"Punch Drunk Grinning Soul"	2010	—	Float
"Don't Shut 'Em Down"	2011	39	Speed of Darkness
"Revolution"	2011	—	Speed of Darkness
"The Heart of the Sea"	2011	—	Speed of Darkness
"This Present State of Grace"	2011	—	Speed of Darkness
"Saints & Sinners"	2012	—	Speed of Darkness
"The Times They Are a-Changin'"	2012	—	Chimes of Freedom
"Speed of Darkness"	2013	—	Speed of Darkness
"The Hand Of John L. Sullivan"	2016	—	Life Is Good
"Reptiles (We Woke Up)"	2017	—	Life Is Good
"The Guns of Jericho"	2017	—	Life Is Good
"Welcome to Adamstown"	2017	—	Life Is Good
"The Days We've Yet to Meet"	2017	—	Life Is Good
"Life is Good"	2017	—	Life Is Good
"These Times Have Got Me Drinking"	2022	—	Anthem
"The Croppy Boy '98"	2022	—	Anthem
"—" denotes a recording that did not chart or was not released in that territory.

== Music videos ==
List of music videos, showing year released and director
Title	Year	Director(s)
"Drunken Lullabies"	2002	—N/a
"What's Left of the Flag"	2002	—N/a
"The Seven Deadly Sins"	2004	PJ Fidler
"Laura"	2006	Andy Platfoot
"Float"	2008	Karni & Saul
"Punch Drunk Grinning Soul"	2010	Artificial Army
"Don't Shut 'Em Down"	2011	—N/a
"Revolution"	2011	—N/a
"The Times They Are A-Changin'"	2012	—N/a
