= Oliver Cromwell in popular culture =

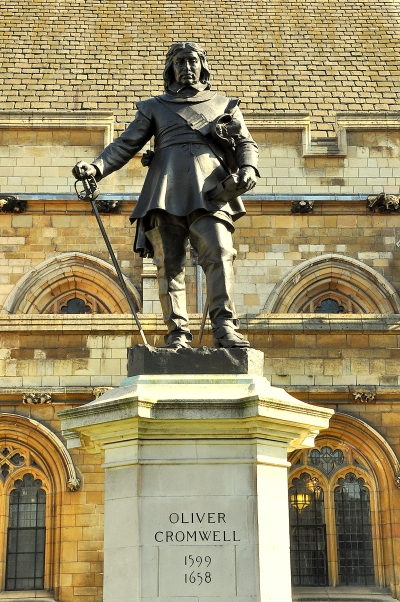
Oliver Cromwell, 1899, by Hamo Thornycroft outside the Palace of Westminster, London

Oliver Cromwell (25 April 1599 – 3 September 1658) was an English military and political leader and later Lord Protector of the Commonwealth of England, Scotland and Ireland.

== In literature ==
The posthumous execution of Cromwell, on the anniversary of the regicide in 1661, struck the imagination of the Italian writer, and State Secretary of Este court in Modena, Girolamo Graziani who involved himself since then in his Il Cromuele (1671), a tragedy that deals with the theme of the dark cruel tyrant, (Oliver Cromwell) and the violated regality (Charles I of England's martyrdom). The plot is full of historical references as well as love affairs between the characters.

One of the earliest novels to feature Cromwell, Abbé Prévost's Le philosophe anglais (1731–1739), portrays him as a hypocritical womaniser, a deceitful tyrant, and a coward. The protagonist of this novel, Mr Cleveland, is Cromwell's illegitimate son via one of Charles I's cast-off mistresses. Cromwell's adoption by the French Romantic movement was typified by Victor Hugo's 1827 play Cromwell, often considered to be symbolic of the French romantic movement, which represents Cromwell as a ruthless yet dynamic Romantic hero. A similar impression of a world-changing individual with a strong will and personality was provided in 1831 in the picture by French artist Hippolyte Delaroche, depicting the visit by Cromwell to the body of Charles I after the king's execution.

Twenty Years After, Alexandre Dumas's 1845 sequel to The Three Musketeers, is set against the backdrop of the Second English Civil War and features Cromwell in a few scenes. The story's main fictitious villain, Mordaunt, is portrayed as Cromwell's secretary and spy.

Oliver Cromwell (1869, translated into English as King, "By the Grace of God") by Julius Rodenberg, focuses on Cromwell's involvement in Charles I's trial. Rodenberg's novel depicts Cromwell as a harsh but just ruler.

Miriam Cromwell, Royalist (1897) by Dora Greenwell McChesney, is a novel focusing on Cromwell's relationship with his niece, Miriam.

The Governor of England (1913) by Marjorie Bowen (pseudonym of Margaret Gabrielle Vere Long) is a novel about Cromwell, with a sympathetic though not uncritical depiction of Cromwell's life.

In 1649: A Novel of a Year (1938) by Jack Lindsay, Cromwell is portrayed as an autocrat who betrays the Leveller movement.

In The White Horse by Robert Leeson (1977), the mixed-race hero joins Cromwell's army and befriends him.

Cromwell (1983) by Brendan Kennelly, is a book-length poem that depicts Oliver Cromwell as a grotesque figure haunting Irish history.

In Orson Scott Card's alternate history fantasy novel series The Tales of Alvin Maker, one of Cromwell's physicians is depicted as a healer able to prevent his death and thus the subsequent English Restoration, although Cromwell himself does not appear in the series. The Elseworlds graphic novel Batman: Holy Terror uses a similar a point of divergence. Another similar fantasy novel series, The Baroque Cycle by Neal Stephenson, contains many references to Cromwell as well as extensive descriptions of his grass-roots supporters and their behaviour after the Restoration. The novel series begins in 1655, three years before Cromwell's death, but once again he does not appear in the novels. The Adventures of Luther Arkwright, a comic-book fantasy adventure spanning countless alternative universes, depicts modern-day England as a fascist theocracy ruled by a descendant of Cromwell. Popular Australian fantasy author Kate Forsyth wrote Cromwell into her series The Chain of Charms.

Cromwell appears as a character in the 1632 series alternate history by Eric Flint and collaborators. He first appears in the book 1633, where he has been imprisoned 'in advance' by Charles I of England, scared by reports of Cromwell's actions in our own timeline. In 1634: The Baltic War, he (along with other historical persons and several fictional Englishmen and Americans) escapes from the Tower of London. After the escape, 1635: A Parcel of Rogues follows Cromwell and others in a return to the Fens to search for his children.

The Morganville Vampires novels feature a character heavily implied to be Cromwell as a vampire in a modern-day Texan town ran by vampires. The character of Oliver's surname is never stated but he is English, his birth year and place are given and are the same as Cromwell's, the year he turned into a vampire is the same as Cromwell's death year and the character is mentioned to have been ill at the time, and another character references Drogheda while speaking to him on one occasion.

A minor but important character in Robert Wilton's 2013 novel Traitor's Field starts with the aftermath of the Battle of Preston in 1648 until Charles II's flight into exile on the continent.

In the Japanese light novel series Zero no Tsukaima, a noble of Albion (a country reminiscent of Great Britain) named Oliver Cromwell leads the nobles in a rebellion against the royal family in a bloody civil war reminiscent of the English Civil War.

Batman: Holy Terror written by Alan Brennert and illustrated by Norm Breyfogle. In this timeline Cromwell recovered from his attack of septicaemia, and lived until 1668, consolidating the Protectorate of England and its sister theocracies in the North American colonies. In the late 20th century, the analogy of the United States of America is a "Commonwealth" run by a corrupt theocratic government.

== In theatre, film and television ==
- George Merritt in the 1937 film The Vicar of Bray.
- Edmund Willard in the 1949 film Cardboard Cavalier.
- Bill Fraser in the 1949 film Helter Skelter.
- In the 1958 British film The Moonraker, Cromwell makes a brief appearance, portrayed by John Le Mesurier.
- Patrick Wymark makes a brief appearance as Cromwell in the 1968 film Witchfinder General.
- The 1970 Ken Hughes film Cromwell starred Richard Harris in the title role.
- Bernard Hepton in Churchill's People.
- Blackadder: The Cavalier Years features a parody of Cromwell played by Warren Clarke.
- Alan Howard in the 1989 film The Return of the Musketeers.
- Cromwell was played by Bernard Hepton in the 12-part radio series God's Revolution, which was written by Don Taylor, broadcast on BBC Radio 4 in 1998 and rebroadcast on BBC Radio 7 in 2010.
- To Kill a King (2003) focused on the relationship between Fairfax (Dougray Scott) and Cromwell (Tim Roth), with Rupert Everett as King Charles I.
- Jack Shepherd's 2004 play Through a Cloud, set in 1656, imagines a meeting between Cromwell and John Milton.
- Cromwell, played by Dominic West, was one of the main characters in the 2008 Channel 4 TV miniseries The Devil's Whore.
- Lawry Lewin and James McNicholas in the British children's sketchshow Horrible Histories (2009 - 2015)
- Howard Brenton's 2012 play 55 Days examines the period following Pride's Purge of Parliament where Cromwell seeks to reach a compromise with King Charles I - in its premiere production, Cromwell was played by Douglas Henshall.

== In music ==
- Rutland Boughton's Symphony No. 1 (1904–05) was subtitled "Oliver Cromwell".
- Cromwell has been mentioned in popular songs, such as:
  - "Oliver Cromwell" released by Monty Python in 1989 consists of a factually accurate but light-hearted capsule biography sung to Chopin's Polonaise in A-flat, Op. 53, for piano.
  - "You'll Never Beat the Irish", a 2001 song from the album of the same name by the Wolfe Tones, includes the line "curse of Cromwell plagued the land 'til our towns were red with blood."
  - "The Men Behind the Wire", a 1971 song, also popularized by the Wolfe Tones alludes to Cromwell's conquests of Ireland in lyrics, "round the world the truth will echo, Cromwell's men are here again, England's name again is sullied, in the eyes of honest man," in reference to Irish prisoners interned by the British army during the Irish Revolution.
  - Elvis Costello's 1979 hit pop single "Oliver's Army"
  - The Pogues mention him in their 1989 song “Young Ned of the Hill”: about Cromwell's assault on Drogheda, it says: "A curse upon you Oliver Cromwell / You who raped our Motherland.”
  - "Irish Blood, English Heart", the 2004 single by Morrissey includes the lyrics: "I've been dreaming of a time when the English are sick to death of Labour and Tories / And spit upon the name Oliver Cromwell / And denounce this royal line that still salute him / And will salute him forever".
  - Reverend Bizarre have a song named "Cromwell" on their 2005 album II Crush the Insects
  - Flogging Molly mention him in their 2004 song "Tobacco Island" from their album Within a Mile of Home about the deportation of Irish people to Barbados: "'Twas 1659 / forgotten now for sure / They dragged us from our homeland / with the musket and their gun / Cromwell and his roundheads / battered all we knew / Shackled hopes of freedom / we're naught but stolen goods". On the live album Live at the Greek Theatre, singer Dave King stated: "I suppose there's nothing like a good song written about a bad bastard, is there?" There's an error in these lyrics mentioning the year 1659, as Cromwell died in 1658.
  - "Anthem for Doomed Youth", a ballad by The Libertines from the band's 2015 album Anthems for Doomed Youth includes the line "Was it Cromwell or Orwell who first led you to the stairwell, which leads only forever to kingdom come?".
  - "Cromwell's Skull", from Steeleye Span's 2016 album, Dodgy Bastards, which is told from the point of view of the skull as it is situated on its spike outside Westminster Hall.
  - New Model Army a British rock band took their name from Cromwell's army.
