= Alive Behind the Green Door =

Live album by Flogging Molly
- Released: Late 1997
- Recorded: Late 1997
- Genre: Punk rock, Celtic rock
- Length: 46:20
- Label: 26f Records

Flogging Molly chronology
Alive Behind the Green Door (1997)	Swagger (2000)

Alive Behind the Green Door is a live album by the Celtic punk band Flogging Molly, recorded at Molly Malone's in 1997.

== Songs ==
The album features two cover songs, "What's Made Milwaukee Famous (Has Made a Loser Out of Me)" and "De (That's All Right) Lilah", which is a combination of "Delilah" by Tom Jones and "That's All Right (Mama)" by Elvis Presley. Of the original songs on the album, the song "Never Met a Girl Like You Before" has not been recorded in the studio. "Every Dog Has Its Day", "Selfish Man", and "Black Friday Rule" were recorded for Swagger (2000), "Swagger" and "If I Ever Leave This World Alive" were recorded for Drunken Lullabies (2002), "Laura" was recorded for Whiskey on a Sunday (2006), and "Between a Man and a Woman" was recorded for Float (2008).

Professional ratings
Review scores
Source	Rating
Allmusic	3.5/5 stars

== Track listing ==
All songs by Flogging Molly unless otherwise noted.

1. "Swagger" – 2:50
2. "Every Dog Has Its Day" – 4:42
3. "Selfish Man" – 3:08
4. "Never Met a Girl Like You Before" – 3:36
5. "Laura" – 4:40
6. "If I Ever Leave This World Alive" – 3:44
7. "Black Friday Rule" – 8:20
8. "What Made Milwaukee Famous (Made a Loser Out of Me)" (Glenn Sutton) – 2:45
9. "Between a Man and a Woman" – 4:00
10. "De (That's All Right) Lilah" (Arthur Crudup, John Barry Mason, David Leslie Reed) – 8:35

== Personnel ==
- Dave King – vocals, acoustic guitar
- Bridget Regan – violin
- Ted Hutt – electric guitar
- Jeff Peters – bass
- George Schwindt – drums
- Toby McCallum – mandolin
