= Beggars Bush, Dublin =

Southern inner city locality in Dublin city, Ireland

Coordinates: 53.336371°N 6.235284°W

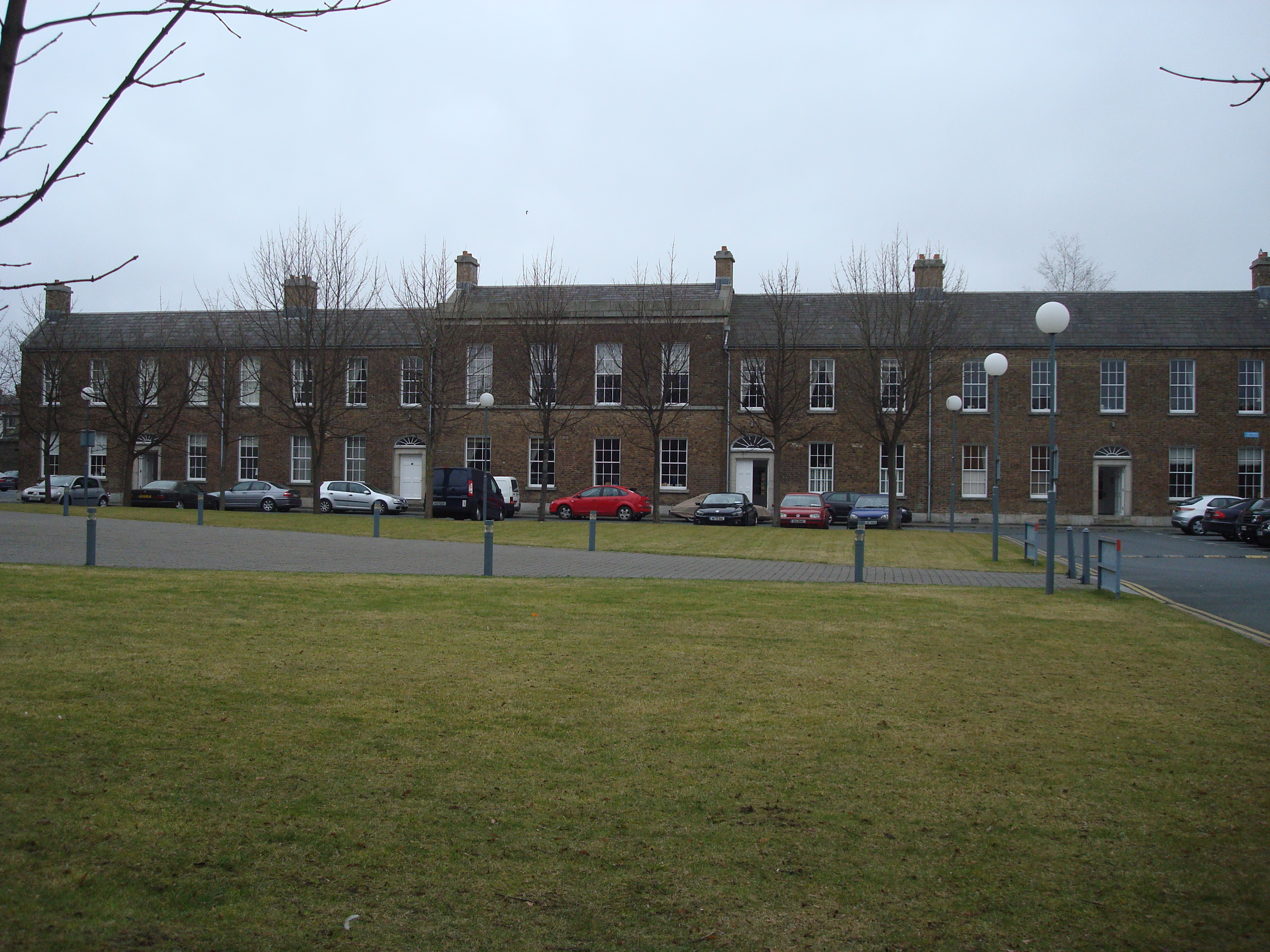
Western side of main square, Beggars Bush, Dublin

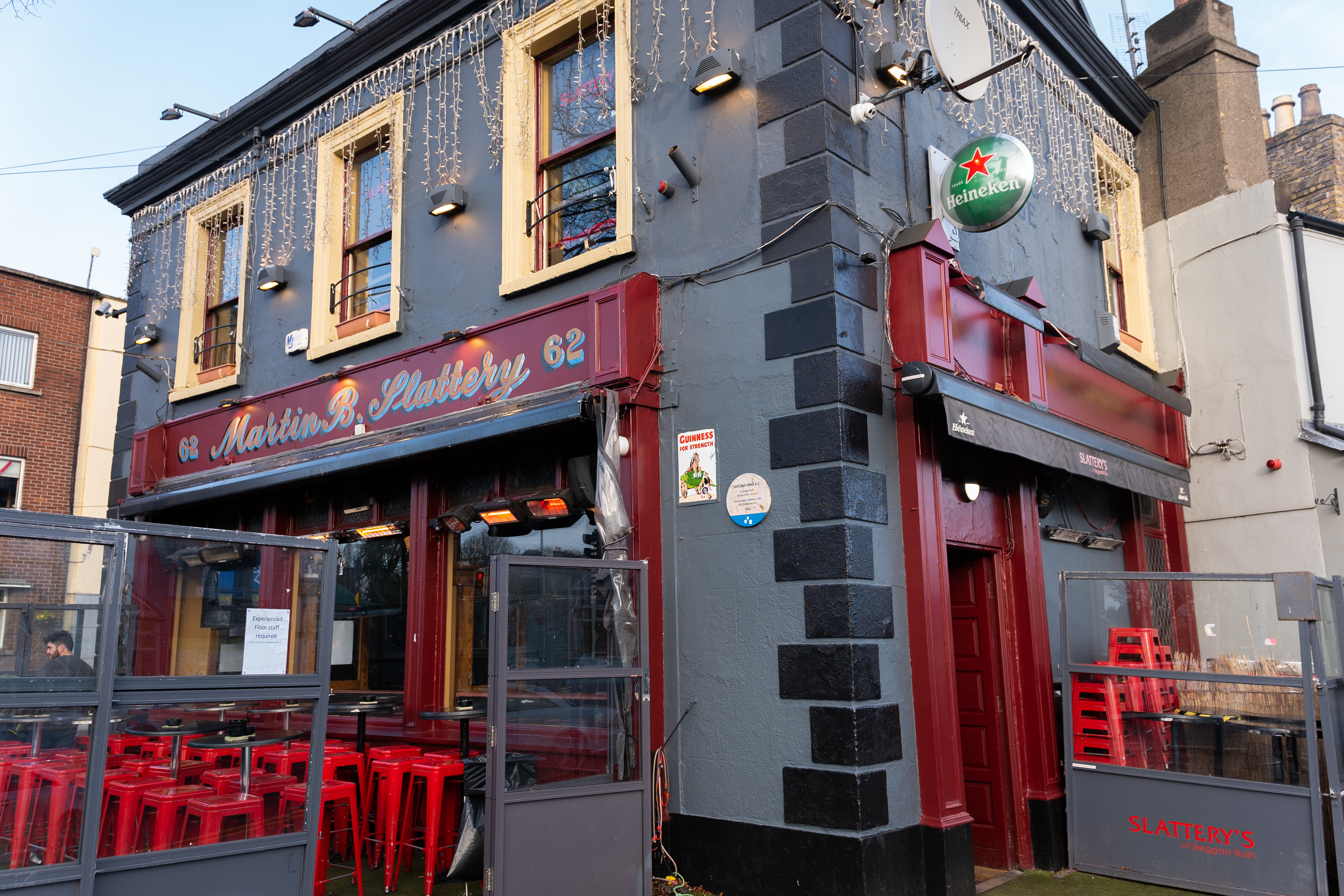
Slattery's Pub at the Beggar's Bush cross roads

Beggars Bush (Irish: Tor an Bhacaigh) is the site of the former Beggars Bush Barracks on Haddington Road in the inner southern suburbs of Dublin, Ireland, as well the surrounding area and a nearby pub. The barracks were bordered to the east by Shelbourne Road, which used to be the western bank of the River Dodder. The locality is in the jurisdiction of Dublin City Council, is broadly considered to be part of Ballsbridge, and is in the postal district Dublin 4.

== History ==
Archbishop Alen's register refers to the area as Beggarsditch as far back as 1326.

The earliest specific mention is a 1573 reference to "the wood called Beggars boush". Neil Howlett notes earlier instances of "Beggars Bush" as a minor placename in England, usually denoting poor-quality farmland. The idea that it denoted a meeting place for beggars or a thieves' den is rejected by Howlett as a folk etymology originating in Brewer's Dictionary of Phrase and Fable.

The site has been occupied by a pub since at least 1803. It was also occupied by the Beggars Bush Barracks from 1827 until 1929 but is now the home of the Irish Labour History Society Museum, National Print Museum, and the former home of the Labour Relations Commission and the Geological Survey of Ireland.

== Trivia ==
- Beggars Bush is mentioned in the song Whiskey on a Sunday, in the versions made popular by performers including The Irish Rovers and The Dubliners.
- Flogging Molly lead singer and guitarist Dave King grew up in Beggars Bush, and the band recorded a song called "The Ol' Beggars Bush" on their album Swagger. Also on the album was the song "Life in Tenement Square" which is believed to reference the area.
