= What's Made Milwaukee Famous (Has Made a Loser Out of Me) =

Single by Jerry Lee Lewis

from the album Another Place, Another Time
- B-side: "All the Good Is Gone"
- Released: May 1968
- Genre: Country
- Length: 2:35
- Label: Smash
- Songwriter(s): Glenn Sutton
- Producer(s): Jerry Kennedy; Eddie Kilroy

Jerry Lee Lewis singles chronology
"Another Place Another Time" (1968)	"What's Made Milwaukee Famous (Has Made a Loser Out of Me)" (1968)	"She Still Comes Around (to Love What's Left of Me)" (1968)

"What's Made Milwaukee Famous (Has Made a Loser Out of Me)" is a song written by Glenn Sutton. The song's title is a reference to beer, specifically Schlitz beer, which for many years was advertised with the slogan, "The beer that made Milwaukee famous."

In 1968, Jerry Lee Lewis released his version as a single. It became a top-ten hit on Billboard's country chart and made a minor impact on the Billboard Hot 100.

== Chart performance ==
Chart (1968)	Peak position
U.S. Billboard Hot 100 Singles	94
U.S. Billboard Hot Country Singles	2
Canadian RPM Country Tracks	1

== Cover versions ==
Johnny Bush released a version of the song on his 1968 album, Undo the Right.

In the United Kingdom, a version by Rod Stewart charted at No. 4 in 1972 as a double A-side with "Angel."

The Texas band What Made Milwaukee Famous takes its name from this song.

Irish-American Celtic punk band Flogging Molly included a live cover of the song on their 1997 debut album, Alive Behind the Green Door.

American country singer Charley Crockett released a cover of the song on his 2016 album, In the Night.
