= Seth Davy =

Black street entertainer in Liverpool

Seth Davy, sometimes spelled Seth Davey, was a black street entertainer who worked in Liverpool, England, at the turn of the 20th century, and was immortalised in the British folk song "Whiskey on a Sunday".

Little is known of Davy outside of the lyrics of the song, which themselves have been varied over the years, with his location sometimes even changed to Beggars Bush, Dublin or Shepherd's Bush in London from the original Bevington Bush in Liverpool. No one is recorded in public records with the precise name of Seth Davy. This vagueness had led to the assumption that the character was imaginary, although many Liverpudlians claimed to have seen him in person.

There is evidence though supporting Seth Davy's existence, or at least the existence of the man he was based on. Fritz Spiegl possessed a lantern slide clearly showing a black street entertainer with jig dolls at Bevington Bush, surrounded by children. The location was at the corner of Bevington Bush and Scotland Road near to the Coach & Horses pub. In the distance can be seen Bevington House Hotel (opened in 1900 it provided lodging accommodation for single men) not to be confused with "The Bush" pub at the other end of Bevington Bush not shown in the photograph. A letter to the Liverpool Echo from William Ashcroft Braley in 1957 that likely inspired the writing of the song claimed that the puppeteer was called Seth Davy and that he was from Port Antonio in Jamaica. Planters from Devon, England are known to have introduced the surname Davy into Jamaica. The existence of the Davy surname among black Jamaicans supports this theory. Ray Costello in his Black History, a history of Liverpool's black population, says that he was West African. Colin Holland of Merseyside Biography Pages also says that he was a West African man, identifies Sierra Leone as his birthplace and says that his name was George Smart not Seth Davy.

Davy sang 'Massa is a stingy man', from the repertoire of Dan Emmett, one of the stars of American minstrelsy, which contains the lines:

"Sing come day, go day
God send Sunday
We'll drink whiskey all de week
And buttermilk on Sunday'"

== Gallery ==
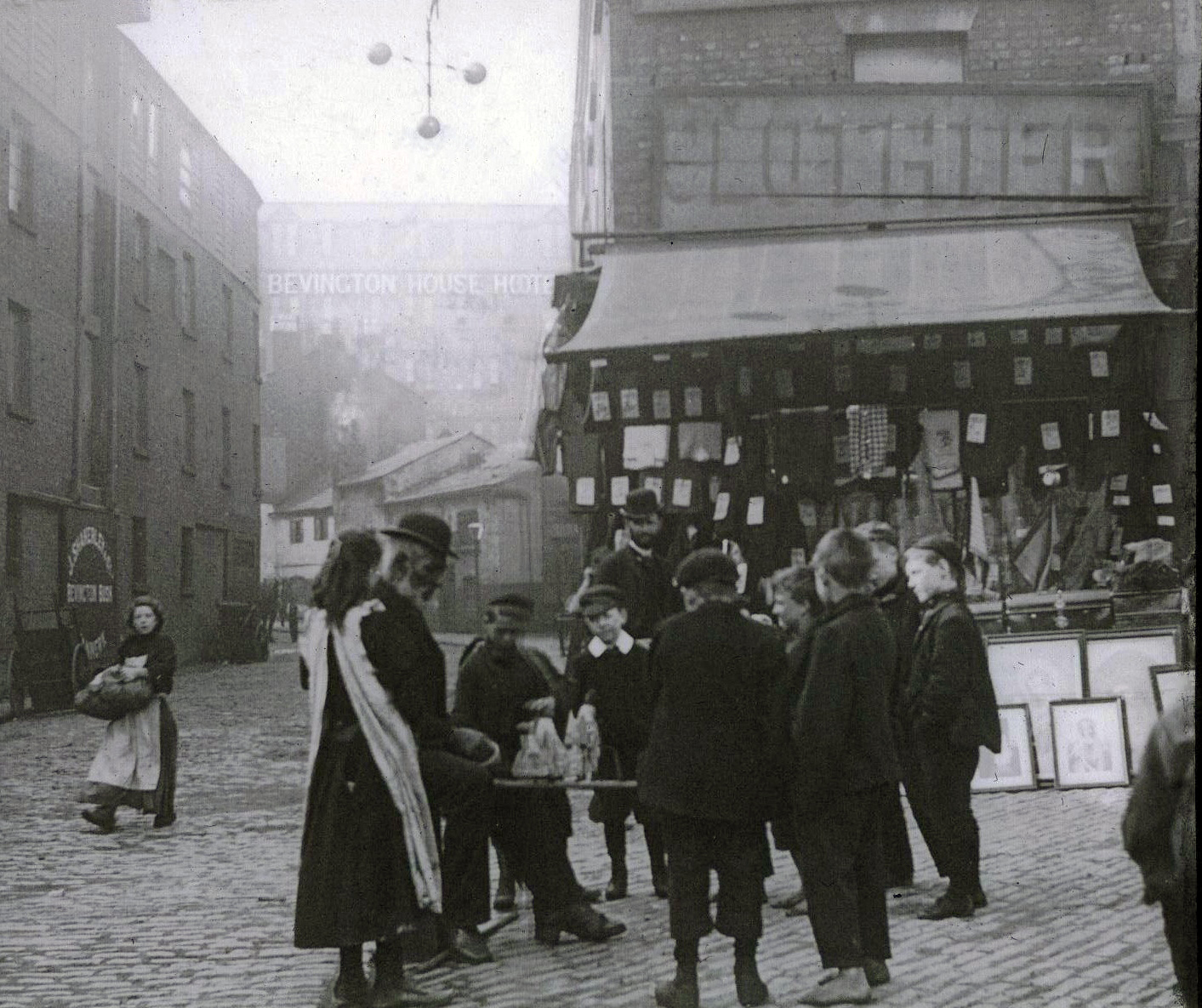
Seth Davy at Bevington Bush, Liverpool (from a lantern slide, circa 1900)
