= Whiskey on a Sunday =

Whiskey on a Sunday may refer to:

- "Whiskey on a Sunday" (song), a British folk song
- Whiskey on a Sunday, a 1968 compilation album by The Dubliners
- Whiskey on a Sunday (album), a 2006 DVD/album by the Irish-American band Flogging Molly
