= Complete Control Sessions =

EP by Flogging Molly
- Released: March 13, 2007
- Recorded: 2006
- Genre: Punk rock, Celtic punk
- Length: 24:37
- Label: SideOneDummy

Flogging Molly chronology
Whiskey on a Sunday (2006)	Complete Control Sessions (2007)	Float (2008)

Complete Control Sessions is an online-only live six-track EP by Celtic punk band Flogging Molly. It was released by SideOneDummy Records on March 13, 2007. It was initially only available through the iTunes Store, but then was available for purchase as MP3s through Amazon.com starting January 8, 2008.

Two of the songs, "Requiem for a Dying Song" and "Float", were previously unreleased and later appeared on Float (2008). Of the other four songs, "Devil's Dance Floor" originally appeared on Swagger (2000) and the others originally appeared on Within a Mile of Home (2004).

== Track listing ==
1. "Requiem for a Dying Song" – 3:29
2. "Whistles the Wind" – 4:06
3. "Tobacco Island" – 4:30
4. "Factory Girls" – 3:55
5. "Float" – 4:48
6. "Devil's Dance Floor" – 3:49
