= Float (Flogging Molly album) =

Studio album by Flogging Molly
- Released: March 4, 2008
- Studios: Grouse Lodge Studios, County Westmeath, Ireland
- Genres: Celtic rock, punk rock
- Length: 39:35
- Label: SideOneDummy
- Producers: Flogging Molly, Ryan Hewitt

Flogging Molly chronology
Complete Control Sessions (2007)	Float (2008)	Live at the Greek Theatre (2010)

Singles from Float
- 1. "Requiem for a Dying Song" Released: March 4, 2008; 2. "Float" Released: June 24, 2008

Float is the fourth studio album by the Celtic punk band Flogging Molly. It was released on March 4, 2008, and debuted at number four on the Billboard 200 albums chart, selling about 48,000 copies in its first week. It also reached number one on the Billboard Independent chart and number two on the Billboard Alternative chart.

The album features a darker and more political subject matter, with less whimsical and punk-influenced music.

== Critical reception ==
Professional ratings
Review scores
Source	Rating
AllMusic	3.5/5 stars
Spin	7/10
PopMatters	7/10

Float received generally positive reviews from critics. While Decoymusic noted that the edge from Flogging Molly's previous albums Swagger and Drunken Lullabies "isn't there any more", they praised the band for their consistency and for "sharpening their well established sound". In another positive review, AllMusic wrote that Float is "full of the boozy, bleary-eyed, fatalistic poetry that makes Irish music at once romantic and grimly realistic". They also noted the album's political themes regarding the treatment of Iraq war veterans ("From the Back of a Broken Dream") and problems with America's capitalist economy ("You Won't Make a Fool out of Me", "Man with No Country" and "Requiem for a Dying Song"). Spin magazine's review pointed to the band's non-Irish influences evident on the album, including Motörhead, Johnny Cash and John Lennon.

== Track listing ==
All tracks are written by Dave King.

No.	Title	Music	Length
1.	"Requiem for a Dying Song"		3:30
2.	"(No More) Paddy's Lament"	King, Regan, Casey, B. Schmidt, Maxwell, G. Schmidt	3:24
3.	"Float"		4:53
4.	"You Won't Make a Fool Out of Me"		2:43
5.	"The Lightning Storm"	King, Regan, Casey, B. Schmidt, Maxwell, G. Schmidt	3:29
6.	"Punch Drunk Grinning Soul"		4:20
7.	"Us of Lesser Gods"		3:19
8.	"Between a Man and a Woman"	King, Casey, B. Schmidt, Matt Hensley, Maxwell, Regan, G. Schmidt	3:21
9.	"From the Back of a Broken Dream"		3:21
10.	"Man with No Country"	King, Casey, Maxwell, B. Schmidt, Regan, G. Schmidt	3:04
11.	"The Story So Far"	King, Regan, Casey, B. Schmidt, Maxwell, G. Schmidt	4:11
Total length:			39:35

Notes

- The outro of "Punch Drunk Grinning Soul" features a 30-second song written and performed by Tom Corrigan called "Rural Decay".

== Personnel ==
All personnel credits for Float are adapted from the album's liner notes.

Flogging Molly

- Dave King – vocals, acoustic guitar, electric guitar, bodhran
- Dennis Casey – electric guitar, acoustic guitar, vocals
- Matt Hensley – accordion, concertina, piano, vocals
- Nathen Maxwell – bass guitar, vocals
- Bridget Regan – violin, tin whistle, classical guitar, uilleann pipes, vocals
- Robert Schmidt – mandolin, mandola, tenor banjo, five-string banjo, vocals
- George Schwindt – drums, percussion

Additional musicians

- Frank Murray – additional backing vocals
- Paddy Dunning – additional backing vocals

Technical personnel

- Flogging Molly – production
- Ryan Hewitt – production, recording, mixing
- Owen Lewis – recording assistant
- Sara Lyn Killion – mixing assistant, additional engineering
- McKay Garner – additional engineering
- Dave Collins – mastering
- Lindsay Hutchens – Flogging Molly photographs
- Aaron Glas – additional photograph
- Alphabet Arm Design – art direction

== Charts ==
Chart (2008)	Peak position
Austrian Albums (Ö3 Austria)	27
Belgian Albums (Ultratop Flanders)	81
Dutch Albums (Album Top 100)	37
Finnish Albums (Suomen virallinen lista)	26
German Albums (Offizielle Top 100)	45
Swedish Albums (Sverigetopplistan)	36
Swiss Albums (Schweizer Hitparade)	91
US Billboard 200	4
US Top Alternative Albums (Billboard)	2
US Independent Albums (Billboard)	1
US Top Rock Albums (Billboard)	2
