= Anthem (Flogging Molly album) =

Studio album by Flogging Molly
- Released: September 9, 2022
- Studios: Electrical Audio, Chicago, Illinois
- Genre: Celtic punk
- Length: 39:14
- Label: Rise
- Producer: Flogging Molly

Flogging Molly chronology
Life Is Good (2017)	Anthem (2022)

Singles from Anthem
- 1. "These Times Have Got Me Drinking" Released: March 2022; 2. "The Croppy Boy '98" Released: June 7, 2022

Anthem is the seventh studio album by American Celtic punk band Flogging Molly. It is their first studio album since 2017's Life Is Good, as well as the first to feature Spencer Swain on string instruments.

== Recording, release, and reception ==
The album is the first for the band on Rise Records and reunites them with Steve Albini, who recorded two albums of theirs almost 20 years prior. Edwin McFee of Hot Press reviewed the release, giving it a score of seven out of 10, noting that this album shows off the band's best qualities, without departing from their "tried and trusted style".

== Track listing ==
All lyrics are written by Dave King; all music is composed by King with Dennis Casey, Matt Hensley, Nathan Maxwell, and Bridget Regan, except where noted.

No.	Title	Music	Length
1.	"These Times Have Got Me Drinking" / "Tripping Up the Stairs"		4:13
2.	"A Song of Liberty"		3:38
3.	"Life Begins and Ends (But Never Fails)"		3:17
4.	"No Last Goodbye"		3:30
5.	"The Croppy Boy '98"		3:10
6.	"This Road of Mine"		3:18
7.	"(Try) Keep the Man Down"	King, Regan, Casey, Hensley, Maxwell	2:55
8.	"Now Is the Time"	King, Casey, Hensley, Maxwell, Regan	4:00
9.	"Lead the Way"		3:45
10.	"These Are The Days"		4:19
11.	"The Parting Wave"		3:16
Total length:			39:14

== Personnel ==
All personnel credits for Anthem are adapted from the album's liner notes.

Flogging Molly

- Dave King – vocals, acoustic guitar, bodhrán, backing vocals
- Bridget Regan – fiddle, tin whistle, pipes, vocals
- Dennis Casey – electric guitar, acoustic guitar, banjo, backing vocals
- Nathen Maxwell – bass guitar, backing vocals
- Matt Hensley – accordion, button accordion, backing vocals
- Spencer Swain – banjo, mandolin, backing vocals
- Mike Alonso – drums, percussion, spoons

Technical personnel

- Flogging Molly – production
- Steve Albini – recording
- Adam "Atom" Greenspan – mixing
- Robin Schmidt – mastering
- Gavin Glass – additional recording
- Kevin Moore – layout and design
- Ryan Rawtone – cover art

== Charts ==
2022 chart performance for Anthem
Chart	Peak
Austrian Albums (Ö3 Austria)	28
Belgian Albums (Ultratop Flanders)	150
German Albums (Offizielle Top 100)	36
Swiss Albums (Schweizer Hitparade)	22
UK Album Downloads (Official Charts)	38
UK Independent Albums (Official Charts)	23

== See also ==
- Lists of 2022 albums
