= Bob Schmidt (musician) =

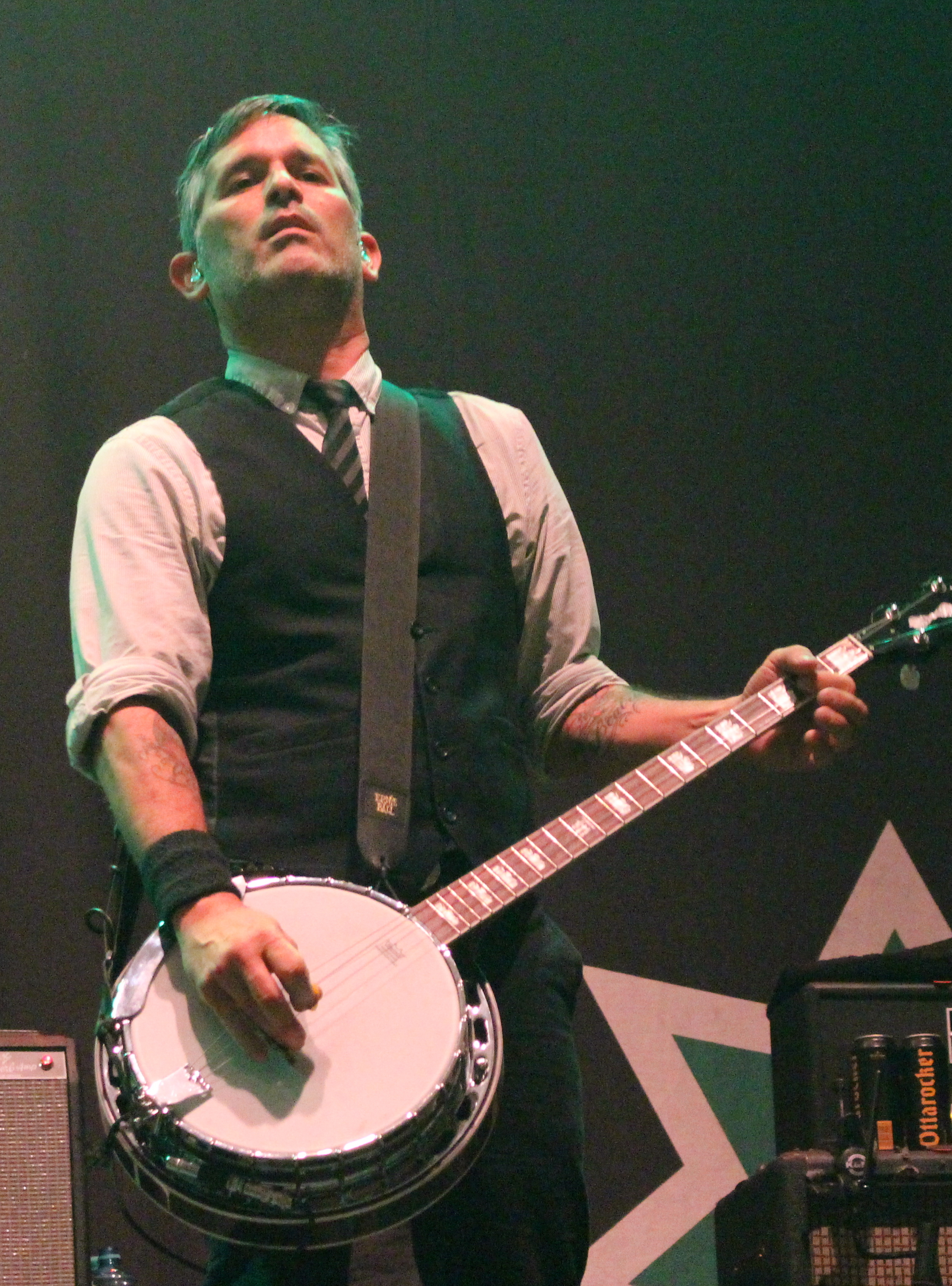
- Schmidt with Flogging Molly in 2016

Background information
- Born: Robert Schmidt
- Genres: Rock, celtic punk, punk, folk, traditional
- Occupation: Musician
- Instruments: Mandolin, banjo, bass, guitar, sitar
- Years active: 1994–present
- Labels: Side One Dummy, Borstal Beat
- Website: Bob Schmidt on Facebook

Robert Schmidt is an American multi-instrumentalist. He is a former member of Irish-American rock band Flogging Molly. He plays mandolin, tenor and 5-string banjo, bass and guitar.

Schmidt was born and raised in Los Angeles, California, the oldest of seven siblings.

Over the course of his career, Schmidt has appeared on stage, or recorded with Goldfinger, Chuck Ragan, The Slackers, Gregory Alan Isakov, The Drowning Men, Dropkick Murphys, Frank Turner, Beans on Toast, and The Rev. Peyton's Big Damn Band.

Schmidt previously played bass in the pop/rock band Nickel, best known for their cameo in the season 2 episode of Buffy the Vampire Slayer "School Hard", in which their songs "Stupid Thing" and "1000 Nights" are played in the Bronze.

Flogging Molly is currently signed to their own record label Borstal Beat Records. Their music has been heard on the soundtracks of multiple video games.

In 2012, Fender introduced their first signature-series mandolin. Named in the musician's honor, the Robert Schmidt Electric Signature Mandolin was also designed by Schmidt. In 2014, Fender later introduced a tenor/plectrum scale signature banjo designed by Schmidt

Schmidt is married. Together he and his wife have two daughters.

== Discography ==
- Stupid Thing (1993)
- Swagger (2000)
- Drunken Lullabies (2002)
- Within a Mile of Home (2004)
- Disconnection Notice / Goldfinger (guest) (2005)
- Whiskey on a Sunday DVD (2006)
- Float (2007)
- Live at the Greek Theatre CD/DVD (2010)
- Speed of Darkness (2011)
- Life Is Good (2017)
