= Speed of Darkness =

Studio album by Flogging Molly
- Released: May 31, 2011
- Recorded: Echo Mountain, Asheville, North Carolina
- Studios: Echo Mountain Recording, Asheville, North Carolina; Sonic Ranch, Tornillo, Texas (Note: Sonic Ranch is incorrectly listed as being in El Paso, Texas in the album's liner notes.)
- Genres: Celtic punk, punk rock
- Label: Borstal Beat Records
- Producers: Ryan Hewitt and Flogging Molly

Flogging Molly chronology
Live at the Greek Theatre (2010)	Speed of Darkness (2011)	Life Is Good (2017)

Professional ratings
Review scores
Source	Rating
AllMusic	3.5/5 stars
Alternative Press	8/10 stars
Rock Sound	5/10 stars
Spin	6/10

Speed of Darkness is the fifth studio album by the Irish-American Celtic punk band Flogging Molly, released on May 31, 2011. The album was recorded at Echo Mountain, an old church building turned recording studio in Asheville, North Carolina. The album was produced by Ryan Hewitt, who has worked with bands Red Hot Chili Peppers and the Avett Brothers. Speed of Darkness debuted at number nine on the Billboard 200 chart and number four on the Billboard Independent Chart. It is the band's last album with drummer George Schwindt.

The expression speed of darkness had appeared in a 1999 book mixing physics and fiction, named The Science of Discworld, written by Terry Pratchett, Ian Stewart and Jack Cohen. In a 2011 interview on BBC Radio 1, frontman Dave King explained that the title track and album title was taken from a quote of Dino Misetić, the artist who designed the album cover, which appeared in the book Sarajevo Marlboro. Misetić, who grew up in the Balkans during the Balkan Wars, is quoted in the book, saying: "They taught us what the speed of light is, but nobody can teach you what the speed of darkness is."

== Track listing ==
All lyrics are written by Dave King; all music is composed by King, Dennis Casey, Bob Schmidt, Matthew Hensley, Nathan Maxwell, Bridget Regan, and George Schmidt, except where noted.

No.	Title	Music	Length
1.	"Speed of Darkness"	King, Regan, Casey, B. Schmidt, Hensley, Maxwell, G. Schmidt	4:08
2.	"Revolution"		3:13
3.	"The Heart of the Sea"	King, Casey, B. Schmidt, Hensley, Maxwell, Regan, G. Schmidt	3:43
4.	"Don't Shut 'Em Down"	King, Regan, Casey, B. Schmidt, Hensley, Maxwell, G. Schmidt	3:40
5.	"The Power's Out"		4:39
6.	"So Sail On"		2:47
7.	"Saints & Sinners"	King, Regan, Casey, B. Schmidt, Hensley, Maxwell, G. Schmidt	3:31
8.	"This Present State of Grace"		2:48
9.	"The Cradle of Humankind"		5:11
10.	"Oliver Boy (All of Our Boys)"		4:07
11.	"A Prayer for Me in Silence"		1:54
12.	"Rise Up"	King, Casey, B. Schmidt, Hensley, Maxwell, Regan, G. Schmidt	3:34
Total length:			43:15

Bonus tracks
No.	Title	Music	Length
13.	"Saints & Sinners (acoustic)"	King, Regan, Casey, B. Schmidt, Hensley, Maxwell, G. Schmidt

== Reception ==
The album received generally positive reviews from music critics. Allmusic gave the album a mostly positive review, commenting that "while Flogging Molly hasn’t done much to innovate on their sound over the past decade or so, it doesn’t feel like they have to." Spin's reception was more mixed, as they wrote that while "rabble-rousing frontman Dave King champions defiant hope amid crushing desperation" the "overly smooth production undercuts his righteous fury, suggesting the group harbors dreams of a Green Day-style commercial breakthrough."

== Personnel ==
All personnel credits for Speed of Darkness are adapted from the album's liner notes.

Flogging Molly

- Dave King – lead vocals, acoustic guitar, electric guitar, classical guitar, bodhran
- Dennis Casey – electric guitar, six string acoustic guitar, twelve string acoustic guitar, vocals
- Matt Hensley – piano accordion, button accordion, concertina, vocals
- Nathen Maxwell – bass, vocals
- Bridget Regan – violin, tin whistle, vocals; lead vocals (11)
- Bob Schmidt – tenor banjo, five string banjo, bouzouki, mandolin, vocals
- George Schwindt – drums, percussion

Additional musicians

- Joe Kwon – cello (3, 5, 6, 9, 10, 11)
- Rich Wiley – trumpet (2)
- Ed Roth – piano (9)
- Evan Hill – gang vocals (10)

Technical personnel

- Ryan Hewitt – production, mixing, engineering
- Flogging Molly – production
- Jordan Silva – engineering
- Evan Hill – assistant engineering
- Jon Ashley – assistant engineering
- Charles Godfrey – assistant engineering
- Dave Collins – mastering
- Dino Misetic – album cover design
- Dan Monick – Flogging Molly photograph
- meuri@reesycle . com – additional design

== Charts ==
Chart (2011)	Peak position
Austrian Albums (Ö3 Austria)	14
Belgian Albums (Ultratop Flanders)	83
Dutch Albums (Album Top 100)	71
German Albums (Offizielle Top 100)	27
Swedish Albums (Sverigetopplistan)	59
Swiss Albums (Schweizer Hitparade)	28
US Billboard 200	9
US Top Alternative Albums (Billboard)	4
US Independent Albums (Billboard)	3
US Top Rock Albums (Billboard)	4
