= Dziura =

Dziura (Polish for hole) may refer to:

== Places ==
- Dziura, a cave in Western Tatras, Poland
- Dziura Nunatak, a nunatak of Victoria Land, Antarctica

== People with the surname ==
- Jim Dziura, American film director, cinematographer, and editor
