= Life Is Good (Flogging Molly album) =

Studio album by Flogging Molly
- Released: June 2, 2017
- Studios: Grouse Lodge, County Westmeath, Ireland
- Genres: Celtic punk, folk punk
- Labels: Vanguard, Spinefarm
- Producers: Joe Chiccarelli, Ross Hogarth

Flogging Molly chronology
Speed of Darkness (2011)	Life Is Good (2017)	Anthem (2022)

Life Is Good is the sixth studio album by the Irish-American Celtic punk band Flogging Molly, released on June 2, 2017. Their first studio album in six years (following 2011's Speed of Darkness), it is also their first album to feature drummer Mike Alonso, and their last album with banjo player Bob Schmidt.

== Track listing ==
All tracks are written by Dave King, Bridget Regan, Dennis Casey, Matt Hensley, Nathan Maxwell, and Bob Schmidt, except where noted.

No.	Title	Writer(s)	Length
1.	"There's Nothing Left Pt. 1"		2:24
2.	"The Hand of John L. Sullivan"		4:01
3.	"Welcome to Adamstown"		3:05
4.	"Reptiles (We Woke Up)"		3:43
5.	"The Days We've Yet to Meet"	King, Maxwell	3:42
6.	"Life Is Good"		4:02
7.	"The Last Serenade (Sailors and Fishermen)"		4:24
8.	"The Guns of Jericho"		4:16
9.	"Crushed (Hostile Nations)"		4:22
10.	"Hope"		3:27
11.	"The Bride Wore Black"		2:59
12.	"Until We Meet Again"		3:55
Total length:			44:20

Professional ratings
Aggregate scores
Source	Rating
Metacritic	61/100
Review scores
Source	Rating
AllMusic	3.5/5 stars
Clash	7/10 stars
Classic Rock	6/10 stars
Kerrang!	4/10 stars

== Reception ==
Life is Good received a 61 out of 100 score on Metacritic, indicating "generally favorable reviews". In their review, Allmusic commented that "The Hand of John L. Sullivan" is a blazing barn burner in the band's signature tradition, and "Crushed [Hostile Nations]" is a slow-building wartime tale with a massive chorus that harkens back to King's heavy metal past." Classic Rock Magazine also gave the album a mostly positive review and called "The Hand of John L. Sullivan" a highlight.

== Personnel ==
All personnel credits for Life Is Good are adapted from the album's liner notes.

Flogging Molly

- Dave King – lead vocals, acoustic guitar, bodhran, spoons
- Bridget Reagan – fiddle, tin whistle, backing vocals
- Dennis Casey – acoustic guitar, electric guitar, backing vocals
- Matt Hensley – accordion, backing vocals
- Nathen Maxwell – bass, lead vocal on "The Days We've Yet to Meet", backing vocals
- Bob Schmidt – banjo, mandolin, backing vocals
- Mike Alonso – drums, percussion, backing vocals

Guests musicians

- Keith Douglas – trumpet (3, 5)
- Brad Magers (Mariachi El Bronx) – trumpet (3, 5)
- Neillidh Mulligan – uilleann pipes (9)

Technical personnel

- Joe Chiccarelli – production, mixing, additional overdubs and editing
- Ross Hogarth – co-production, recording
- Michael Brady – assistant engineer
- Bill Mims – additional overdubs and editing
- Lars Fox – additional overdubs and editing
- Chris Shaw – mixing (1, 2, 6, 7, 9, 10, 12)
- Ken Sluiter – mixing (3–5, 8, 11)
- Paul Blakemore – mastering
- Beth Regan–Tyrell – front cover
- Richie Smyth – additional photos
- Joe McCarthy – package design

== Charts ==
Chart (2017)	Peak position
Austrian Albums (Ö3 Austria)	33
Belgian Albums (Ultratop Flanders)	75
Canadian Albums (Billboard)	50
Dutch Albums (Album Top 100)	142
German Albums (Offizielle Top 100)	40
Swiss Albums (Schweizer Hitparade)	27
US Billboard 200	69
US Top Alternative Albums (Billboard)	8
US Top Rock Albums (Billboard)	13
