= Number One with a Bullet =

Number One with a Bullet may refer to:

- Number One with a Bullet (film), a 1987 American police detective film directed by Jack Smight
- Number One with a Bullet, a 2008 music documentary by Jim Dziura
- #1 with a Bullet, a 1991 music album by American country and comedy singer Ray Stevens
- "#1 with a Bullet," a song by Kool G Rap that appears on the 1992 album Live and Let Die

== See also ==
- "Number One (With A Bullet)", a song by Lindsay Pagano
