= Whiskey on a Sunday (song) =

Song by Glyn Hughes

"Whiskey on a Sunday" is a song written by Glyn Hughes (1932–1972), which became popular during the second British folk revival. It is sometimes called "The Ballad of Seth Davy".

The song laments the death in 1902 of a black street performer, called Seth Davy according to a letter from William Ashcroft Braley to the Liverpool Echo in 1957, who sang and performed with a set of "dancing dolls" outside a public house in Liverpool. The dolls were attached to the end of a plank, and when the plank was struck and vibrated, this caused the dolls to "dance". Fritz Spiegl possessed a lantern slide showing this entertainer with his jig dolls at Bevington Bush, surrounded by children. The puppeteer, who Braley claimed was Jamaican, performed outside the Coach & Horses pub, on the corner of Bevington Bush and Scotland Road, around the turn of the century. In the distance in the photograph can be seen Bevington House Hotel (opened in 1900 it provided lodging accommodation for single men) not to be confused with "The Bush" pub at the other end of Bevington Bush not shown in the photograph. Ray Costello in his Black History, a history of Liverpool's black population, says that he was West African. Colin Holland of Merseyside Biography Pages also says that he was a West African man, identifies Sierra Leone as his birthplace and says that his name was George Smart not Seth Davy. Bevington Bush is located just north of Liverpool City Centre but looks very different today. Songwriter Glyn Hughes originally credited the song to a character he invented called Richard Samuels. A 'Dickie Sam' was an old term for a Scouser.

The original song contains lyrics and idiom specific to Liverpool. In an Irish version, the first-line mention of Bevington Bush appears as Beggars Bush, referring to a location in Dublin. Other versions refer erroneously to Bebington, which is a township in Wirral, on the other side of the River Mersey.

== Recordings ==
The first recording of the song was by Liverpool folk group The Spinners (English band) in 1966. The Irish folk singer Danny Doyle covered the song in 1968 and it remained at No. 1 in the Irish charts for ten weeks. The same year, The Irish Rovers recording of the song climbed the Billboard charts in the US where it remained for eight weeks, and #34 in Canada.

It has also been recorded by Irish folk group The Dubliners, Rolf Harris, The Weavers, The Houghton Weavers, and Max Boyce, among others.
