= Whiskey on a Sunday (album) =

- Cover art by Shepard Fairey

Compilation album by Flogging Molly
- Released: July 25, 2006
- Recorded: 2006
- Genres: Punk rock, Celtic rock
- Length: 47:37
- Label: SideOneDummy
- Producers: Flogging Molly, Ted Hutt

Flogging Molly chronology
Within a Mile of Home (2004)	Whiskey on a Sunday (2006)	Complete Control Sessions EP (2007)

Whiskey on a Sunday is a 2006 DVD/album by the Irish-American punk band Flogging Molly. It features a mix of live and studio recordings and comes with a DVD featuring a documentary of the band. The songs featured on the album include a studio recording of "Laura", which was previously only available on the live album Alive Behind the Green Door, followed by studio acoustic and live versions of songs from their previous studio albums. The live songs were recorded at the Wiltern Theater in Los Angeles. The artwork was done by Shepard Fairey. The documentary was directed, shot and edited by Jim Dziura. Assistant editing was done by Joe "Guisepi" Spadafora. Although primarily a DVD release, it charted at number 67 on the US Billboard 200 chart. It has been certified platinum by the RIAA.

== Track listing ==
1. "Laura" – 4:15
2. "Drunken Lullabies" (Acoustic) – 4:55
3. "The Wanderlust" (Acoustic) – 3:37
4. "Another Bag of Bricks" (Acoustic) – 4:05
5. "Tomorrow Comes a Day Too Soon" (Acoustic) – 3:39
6. "The Likes of You Again" (Live) – 4:08
7. "Swagger" (Live) – 2:14
8. "Black Friday Rule" (Live) – 11:57
9. "Within a Mile of Home" (Live) – 4:34
10. "What's Left of the Flag" (Live) – 4:13

== Personnel ==
- Dave King – lead vocals, acoustic guitar
- Bridget Regan – fiddle, backing vocals, tin whistle
- Bob Schimdt – mandolin, backing vocals, banjo
- Dennis Casey – electric and acoustic guitars, backing vocals
- Matt Hensley – accordion, backing vocals
- Nathen Maxwell – bass, backing vocals
- George Schwindt – drums

== DVD special features ==
The DVD has the following special features:

- "Badger", a short piece on Flogging Molly's technician.
- "Dave in the Studio", Dave King singing "Light of a Fading Star" in the studio.
- "Gary", a short piece on Gary Schwindt, the band's manager, also the brother of Flogging Molly's drummer George Schwindt.
- "Joe and Matt", a short movie of Matt Hensley and Joe Sib from SideOneDummy Records goofing off.
- "Outtakes", including Dennis Casey's request that someone set his nipples on fire.
- "Return to Molly Malone's", a piece on a concert which Flogging Molly performed on Saint Patrick's Day at Molly Malone's Pub in Los Angeles, where the band first played.
- "Rebels of the Sacred Heart", music video with live footage shot at the Wiltern Theater.
- "Selfish Man", music video with live footage shot at the Wiltern Theater.

== Charts ==
Chart (2006)	Peak position
Dutch Albums (Album Top 100)	45
US Billboard 200	67
US Independent Albums (Billboard)	3
US Top Rock Albums (Billboard)	24
