= National Print Museum =

Heritage institution in Dublin, Ireland

- Músaem Náisiúnta Cló
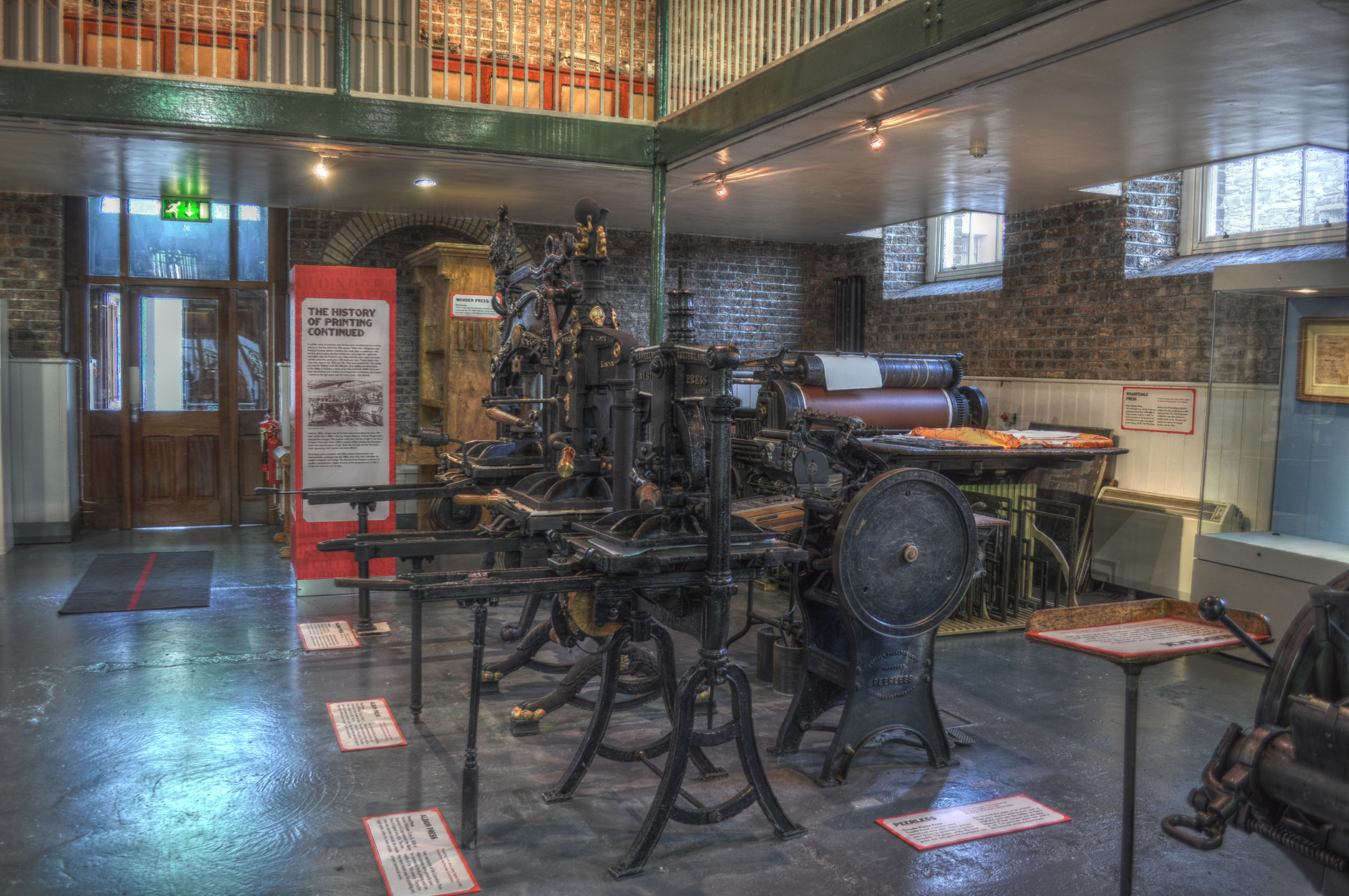
- Interior of museum

- Location within Dublin Location within Ireland
- Established: 1996
- Location: Garrison Chapel, Beggars Bush Barracks, Dublin, Ireland
- Coordinates: 53.3355°N 6.2346°W
- Collection size: 10,000
- Chairperson: Barry Lyons
- Curator: Seán Sills
- Owner: National Print Museum Ltd.
- Public transit access: Grand Canal Dock railway station Northumberland Road bus stop (Dublin Bus routes 4, 7, 8)
- Website: nationalprintmuseum.ie

The National Print Museum in Beggar's Bush, Dublin, Ireland, collects, and exhibits a representative selection of printing equipment, and samples of print, and fosters associated skills of the printing craft in Ireland. It was opened in 1996.

== Mission and accreditation ==
The mission of the museum is to collect, document, preserve, exhibit, interpret and make accessible the material evidence of printing craft, and fosters associated skills of the craft in Ireland. It aims to ensure that printers, historians, students and the general public can explore how printing developed and brought information, in all its forms, to the world.

The museum is fully accredited under The Heritage Council’s Museum Standards Programme for Ireland.

== Collection and exhibits ==
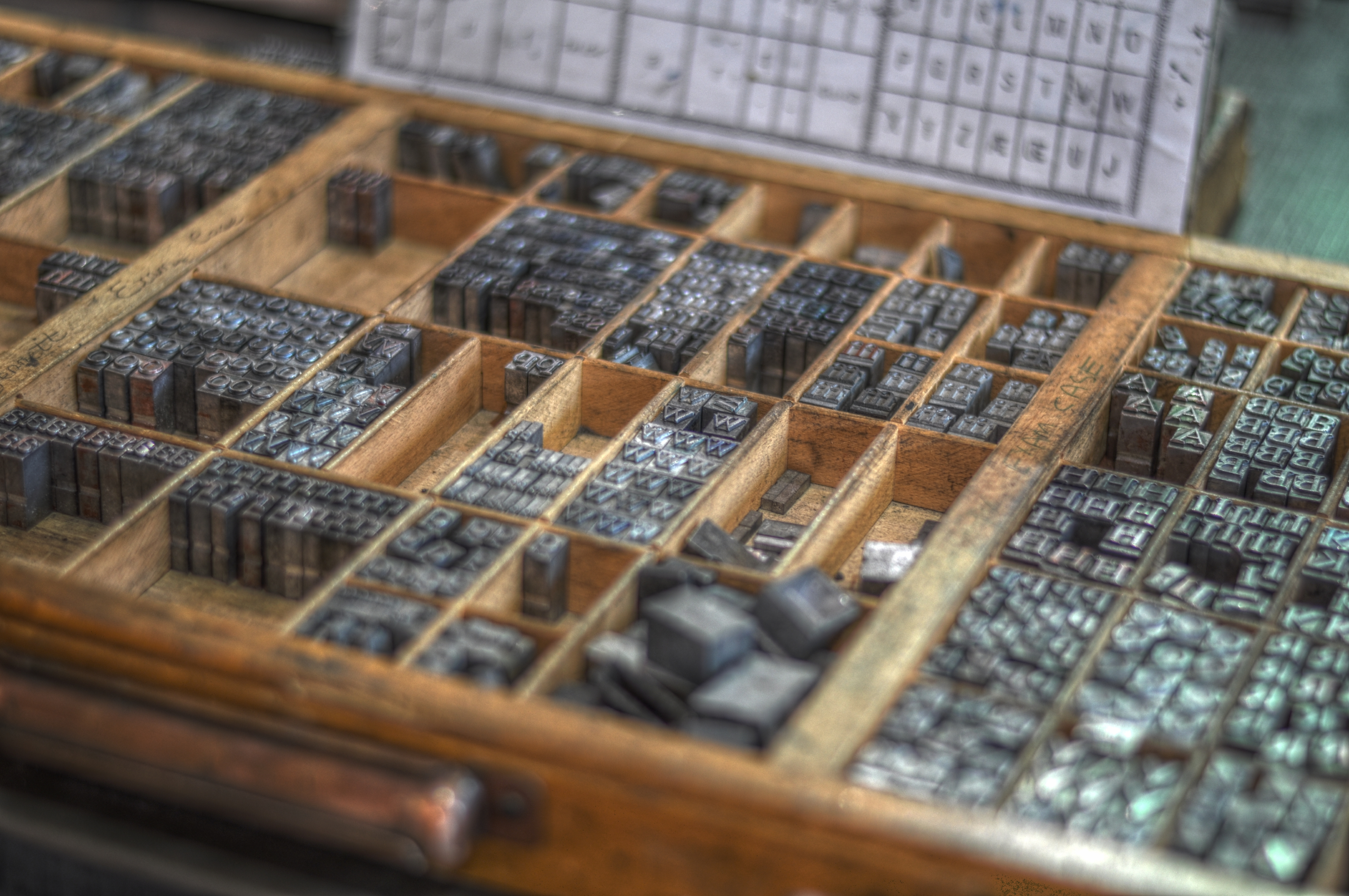
Exhibition in National Print Museum

The museum holds over 10,000 items including printing machinery, printing blocks, metal and wooden moveable type, ephemera, photographs, books, pamphlets and periodicals.

A group of volunteers, mainly retired printers, help keep many of the printing machines running. They also have developed an apprenticeship program to pass along their knowledge.

On exhibit is a representative display of the equipment and artefacts of the rich centuries-old printing heritage, including a replica Gutenberg press (on loan from The Tudors TV series). There was also an original 1916 Proclamation along with a machine (Wharfedale) similar to the one it was printed on.

== Facilities ==
The museum has two floors, with a shop, a cafe at the rear, and a children's corner upstairs.

== Activities ==
The National Print Museum's activities include guided tours, exhibitions, workshops, outreach, lectures and demonstration days. Workshops focus on print-related crafts such as calligraphy, actual printmaking, and batik.
