= Within a Mile of Home =

Studio album by Flogging Molly
- Released: September 14, 2004
- Recorded: Cello Studios (Hollywood, California); Ocean Studios (Burbank, California)
- Genres: Punk rock, pop punk, Celtic rock
- Length: 52:08
- Label: SideOneDummy
- Producer: Ted Hutt

Flogging Molly chronology
Drunken Lullabies (2002)	Within a Mile of Home (2004)	Whiskey on a Sunday (2006)

Singles from Within a Mile of Home
- 1. "The Seven Deadly Sins" Released: 2004; 2. "The Light of a Fading Star" Released: 2005

Within a Mile of Home is the third studio album by the Celtic punk band Flogging Molly. Released in 2004, the album reached No. 20 on the U.S. Billboard Top 200 chart and No. 1 on the Independent Music chart. The album is dedicated to Joe Strummer and Johnny Cash, as indicated in the album's liner notes. The song "To Youth (My Sweet Roisin Dubh)" was featured on the soundtrack of FIFA Football 2005.

== Reception ==
Professional ratings
Review scores
Source	Rating
AllMusic	3.5/5 stars
PopMatters	n/a
Punknews.org	4/5 stars

In their review, AllMusic noted Flogging Molly's "more mature, more polished" sound on this album and its stylistic variations. They pointed to the Cajun-influenced accordions on "Tomorrow Comes a Day Too Soon", the a capella performance on "The Wrong Company" and guest Lucinda Williams' guest appearance on "Factory Girls" as evidence of this. The reviewer also appreciated the album's varied themes which include modern-day U.S. policy concerns ("Screaming at the Wailing Wall") and Oliver Cromwell shipping Irish workers to Barbados during the 17th century ("Tobacco Island"). In another positive review, Punknews.org said that Flogging Molly "have a mastery of the traditional sound, and their harder and faster songs are definitely a lot of fun." The reviewer for PopMatters had high praise for the album. The review referred to the opening track "Screaming at the Wailing Wall" as a "toe-tapping, arm-in-arm Celtic boogie tune" and the following song "The Seven Deadly Sins" as a "kitchen-party Celtic assault". The review also noted that the song "To Youth (My Sweet Roisin Dubh)" sounds like a "Dublin-ized Mike Ness of Social Distortion" and that "The Wanderlust" as a combination of The Clash and The Pogues.

== Track listing ==
All lyrics are written by Dave King, except where noted; all music is composed by King, Dennis Casey, Bob Schmidt, Matt Hensley, Nathan Maxwell, Bridgett Regan, and George Schmidt, except where noted.

No.	Title	Lyrics	Music	Length
1.	"Screaming at the Wailing Wall"		King, Ted Hutt, Casey, B. Schmidt, Hensley, Maxwell, Regan, G. Schmidt	3:41
2.	"The Seven Deadly Sins"		King, Hensley, Casey, B. Schmidt, Maxwell, Regan, G. Schmidt	2:50
3.	"Factory Girls" (featuring Lucinda Williams)			3:51
4.	"To Youth (My Sweet Roisin Dubh)"			3:17
5.	"Whistles the Wind"		King, Hutt, Casey, B. Schmidt, Hensley, Maxwell, Regan, G. Schmidt	4:32
6.	"The Light of a Fading Star"			3:52
7.	"Tobacco Island"		King, Regan, Casey, B. Schmidt, Hensley, Maxwell, G. Schmidt	5:17
8.	"The Wrong Company"		King	0:36
9.	"Tomorrow Comes a Day Too Soon"			3:32
10.	"Queen Anne's Revenge"	Maxwell	Maxwell, Casey, King B. Schmidt, Hensley, Maxwell, Regan, G. Schmidt	3:06
11.	"The Wanderlust"			3:31
12.	"Within a Mile of Home"			3:53
13.	"The Spoken Wheel" (featuring Noel O'Donovan)			2:13
14.	"With a Wonder and a Wild Desire"			3:40
15.	"Don't Let Me Die Still Wondering"			4:17
Total length:				52:08

== Personnel ==
All personnel credits for Within a Mile of Home are adapted from the album's liner notes.

Flogging Molly

- Dave King – lead vocals, acoustic guitar, banjo, bodhran, spoons, backing vocals
- Bridget Regan – fiddle, tin whistle, uilleann pipes, backing vocals
- Nathen Maxwell – bass, backing vocals; lead vocals (10)
- George Schwindt – drums, percussion
- Dennis Casey – electric guitar, backing vocals
- Bob Schmidt – mandolin, banjo, bouzouki, backing vocals, mandola
- Matt Hensley – accordion, concertina

Additional musicians

- Lucinda Williams – additional vocals (3)
- Stephanie Fife – cello (5)
- Novi Novog – viola (5)
- Craig Jackman – washboard (9)
- Noel O'Donovan – additional vocals (13)
- Lee Thornburg – horns (15)
- Zander Cox – additional backing vocals
- Fran DeAngelo – additional backing vocals
- Erik Payne – additional backing vocals
- Emer Lalor – additional backing vocals
- Mairead Murphy – additional backing vocals
- Emma Allen – additional backing vocals

Technical personnel

- Ted Hutt – production, mixing
- Ken Sluiter – engineering, mixing
- Jason Gossman – assistant engineer
- Jose Borges – assistant engineer
- Garen Avetisyan – assistant engineer
- Eddie Schreyer – mastering
- Shawn Bishop – band photography

== Charts ==
Chart (2004)	Peak position
Belgian Albums (Ultratop Flanders)	96
Dutch Albums (Album Top 100)	61
US Billboard 200	20
US Independent Albums (Billboard)	1
