= Beggars Bush Barracks =

British and Irish barracks in Dublin (1827–1929)

- Beggars Bush, Dublin
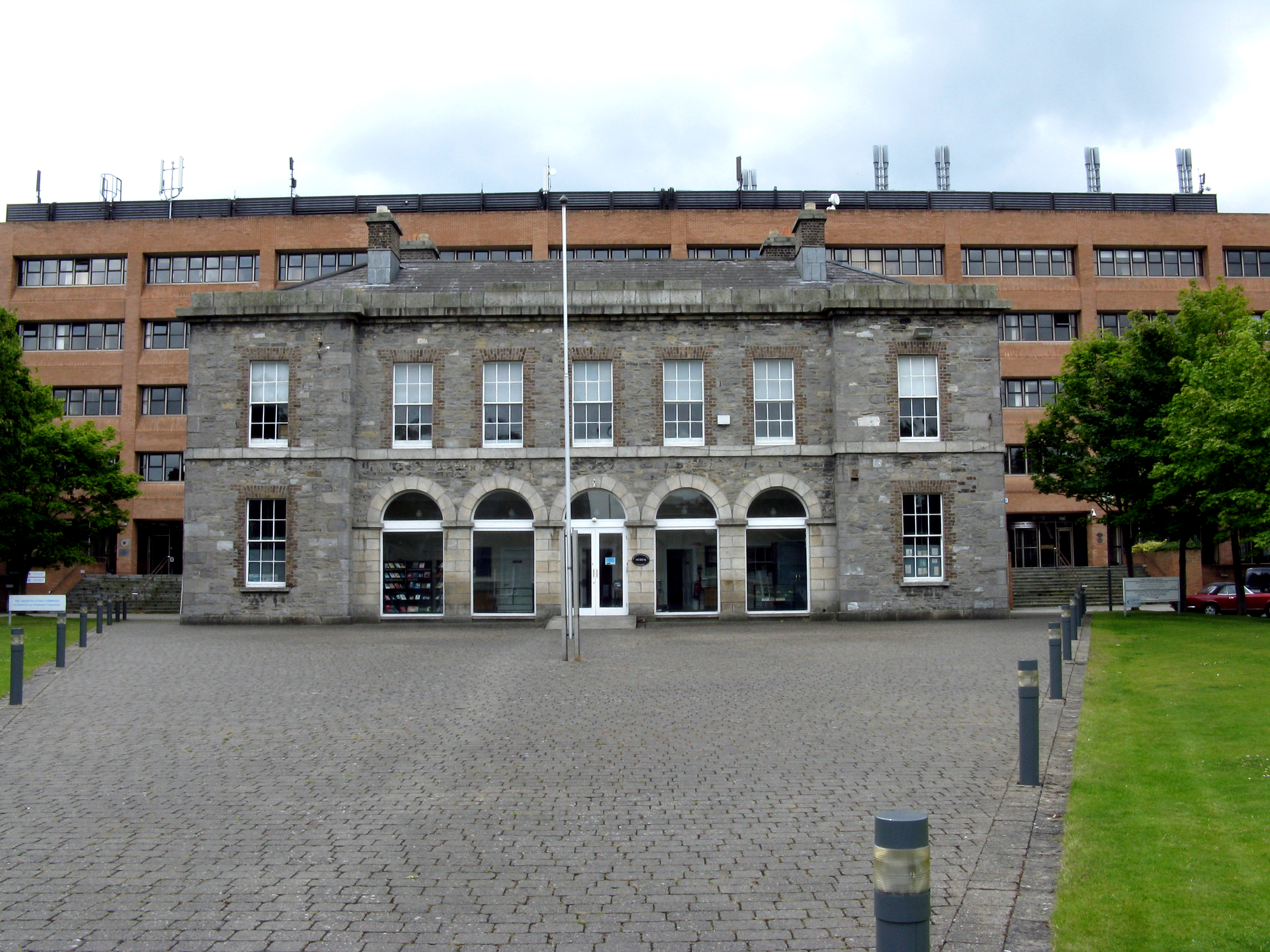
- The former central garrison headquarters at Beggars Bush Barracks

Site information
- Type: Barracks
- Operator: (United Kingdom) British Army (1827–1922) (Republic of Ireland) National Army (1922) (Republic of Ireland) Irish Army (1922–1929)

Location
- Location within Dublin
- Coordinates: 53.336371°N 6.235284°W

Site history
- Built: 1827
- Built for: War Office
- In use: 1827–1929

Beggars Bush Barracks was a British Army barracks located at Beggars Bush in Dublin, Ireland. Completed in 1827, it was turned over to the National Army in 1922 and used by the Irish Army until its decommissioning in 1929. It is currently used by various government institutions.

== History ==
The barracks were designed as a training depot for the British Army and were completed in 1827, built on lands received from George Herbert, 11th Earl of Pembroke. Two squadrons of the South Irish Horse were formed at the barracks in the early 20th century, which were mobilised at the barracks in August 1914 before being deployed to the Western Front.

Beggars Bush Barracks were the first barracks to be handed over to the Irish Republican Army in January 1922. The barracks then became the new headquarters of the National Army. Erskine Childers, a leading IRA revolutionary, was executed at the barracks on 24 November 1922 after conviction by an Irish military court for the unlawful possession of a gun, a weapon presented to him by Michael Collins.

The barracks were decommissioned in 1929 and handed over to the "Gaeltacht Industries Depot" which had responsibility for marketing goods produced in Ireland. The site is now used by various other government departments. The Irish Labour History Society Museum is based in the former central garrison headquarters and the National Print Museum is based in the former Garrison Chapel.

== See also ==
- List of Irish military installations
