= Jim Dziura =

American film director

Jim Dziura is an American film director, cinematographer, and editor. His work often involves music-related themes and his subjects are sometimes marginalized members of society.

His work includes the feature-documentary Whiskey on a Sunday (2006) about the rock band Flogging Molly, which was awarded a Platinum disc from the RIAA; the short documentary film Steel Don't Bend (2007) about modern-day hobos; the short documentary film That's Life (2007) about punk rock icon Duane Peters; the 10-episode Road to the Throwdown series (2008) about the rock band The Mighty Mighty Bosstones; and the feature-length documentary Number One with a Bullet (2008) produced by QD3 and starring Ice Cube, KRS-One, Young Buck, B-Real, Obie Trice, Jerry Heller, and Damon Dash. The film was the opening night film at the 2008 Hollywood Film Festival and additionally screened at 2009 South by Southwest Film Festival.

Dziura has directed and/or edited commercials for Sprite, Boost Mobile, Nike, Inc., the Virginia Tobacco Settlement Fund, Ford Motor Company and Interscope Records.

Dziura has a BA from Colorado College and lives in Los Angeles.

== Filmography ==
- Scratch: All the Way Live (2004) - cinematographer, editor
- Whiskey on a Sunday (2005) - director, cinematographer, editor
- Infamy (2005) - second unit director
- Steel Don't Bend (2006) - co-director
- That's Life (2007) - director, cinematographer, editor
- Big Rig (2008) - gaffer
- Number One with a Bullet (2008) - director, cinematographer, editor
