= Drunken Lullabies =

Studio album by Flogging Molly
- Released: March 19, 2002
- Recorded: 2001
- Genre: Celtic punk
- Length: 45:18
- Label: SideOneDummy
- Producers: Flogging Molly, Ted Hutt

Flogging Molly chronology
Swagger (2000)	Drunken Lullabies (2002)	Within a Mile of Home (2004)

Singles from Drunken Lullabies
- 1. "Drunken Lullabies" Released: 2002

Professional ratings
Review scores
Source	Rating
AllMusic	4/5 stars
Punknews.org	4/5 stars
The Reno Gazette-Journal	3.5/4 stars
The San Diego Union-Tribune	3/4 stars
The Spokesman-Review	A−
Sputnikmusic	4.5/5 stars
Scream Magazine	5/6 stars

Drunken Lullabies is the second studio album by the Irish-American punk band Flogging Molly. Their first album to feature guitarist Dennis Casey, it reached number 157 on the Billboard charts. It has since been certified gold by the Recording Industry Association of America (RIAA).

The title track "Drunken Lullabies" was featured on the soundtrack of the video game Tony Hawk's Pro Skater 4 as well as the Fat Wreck Chords compilation Rock Against Bush, Vol. 2.

== Reception ==
AllMusic gave the album a positive review. The review called the title track a standout and noted its themes of "decrying the ills of modern society" as well as its "breakneck speed". It also referred to the song "Death Valley Queen" as a "dirge of Dylanesque proportions." The reviewer concluded that "After one listen, you'll probably wish you were Irish." In a four-star review, Punknews.org said that Flogging Molly "sounds authentic" and named "What's Left of the Flag", "Rebels of the Sacred Heart" and "The Rare Ould Times" as the standout tracks.

== Track listing ==
All lyrics are written by Dave King, except where noted; all music is composed by Flogging Molly, except where noted.

No.	Title	Writer(s)	Length
1.	"Drunken Lullabies"	Dave King, Ted Hutt, Dennis Casey, Matt Hensley, Nathen Maxwell, Bridget Regan, Bob Schmidt, George Schwindt	3:50
2.	"What's Left of the Flag"		3:39
3.	"May the Living Be Dead (in Our Wake)"		3:50
4.	"If I Ever Leave This World Alive"		3:21
5.	"The Kilburn High Road"	King, Hutt, Casey, Hensley, Maxwell, Regan, Schmidt, Schwindt	3:43
6.	"Rebels of the Sacred Heart"		5:11
7.	"Swagger"	King, Hutt, Hensley, Maxwell, Regan, Schmidt, Schwindt	2:05
8.	"Cruel Mistress"	Maxwell, King, Casey, Hensley, Regan, Schmidt, Schwindt	2:57
9.	"Death Valley Queen"		4:18
10.	"Another Bag of Bricks"		3:45
11.	"The Rare Ould Times"	Pete St. John	4:06
12.	"The Son Never Shines (on Closed Doors)"		4:25
Total length:			45:18

== Personnel ==
- Dave King – lead vocals, acoustic guitar, banjo, bodhran, spoons, backing vocals
- Bridget Regan – fiddle, tin whistle, uilleann pipes, backing vocals
- Dennis Casey – electric guitar, backing vocals
- Matt Hensley – accordion
- Nathen Maxwell – bass, backing vocals, lead vocal on "Cruel Mistress"
- Bob Schmidt – mandolin, banjo, bazouki, backing vocals
- George Schwindt – drums

== Charts ==
Chart (2002)	Peak position
Dutch Albums (Album Top 100)	48
US Billboard 200	104
US Independent Albums (Billboard)	8
