= Live at the Greek Theatre (Flogging Molly album) =

Live album by Flogging Molly
- Released: March 2, 2010
- Recorded: September 12, 2009
- Genre: Punk rock, Celtic rock
- Length: 93:58
- Label: SideOneDummy

Flogging Molly chronology
Float (2008)	Live at the Greek Theatre (2010)	Speed of Darkness (2011)

Live at the Greek Theatre is a live album by the Celtic punk band Flogging Molly, recorded at The Greek Theatre in Los Angeles in 2009. It was released on March 2, 2010 on SideOneDummy Records. It features two CDs as well as a DVD of the same live performance and the band's music videos.

On March 4, 2010, "Drunken Lullabies" was made available on the Rock Band Network.

== Track listing ==
=== Disc one ===
1. "The Likes of You Again" – 4:46
2. "Swagger" – 2:17
3. "Requiem for a Dying Song" – 3:22
4. "Man With No Country" – 4:08
5. "Every Dog Has Its Day" – 4:12
6. "These Exiled Years" – 5:01
7. "Drunken Lullabies" – 4:03
8. "You Won't Make a Fool Out of Me" – 2:44
9. "(No More) Paddy's Lament" – 3:53
10. "Us of Lesser Gods" – 4:28
11. "The Son Never Shines (On Closed Doors)" – 4:31
12. "Float" – 5:04

=== Disc two ===
1. "Tobacco Island" – 6:14
2. "Rebels of the Sacred Heart" – 6:02
3. "Devil's Dance Floor" – 4:09
4. "If I Ever Leave This World Alive" – 3:46
5. "Salty Dog" – 3:43
6. "The Lightning Storm" – 4:11
7. "What's Left of the Flag" – 5:33
8. "The Wrong Company" – 0:59
9. "The Story So Far" – 6:49
10. "The Seven Deadly Sins" – 4:03

== Chart performance ==
Chart	Peak position
US Billboard 200	40
US Top Alternative Albums (Billboard)	2
US Independent Albums (Billboard)	5
US Top Rock Albums (Billboard)	5
