= Swagger (Flogging Molly album) =

Studio album by Flogging Molly
- Released: March 7, 2000
- Recorded: 2000
- Genre: Celtic punk
- Length: 53:40
- Label: SideOneDummy
- Producer: Flogging Molly

Flogging Molly chronology
Alive Behind the Green Door (1997)	Swagger (2000)	Drunken Lullabies (2002)

Professional ratings
Review scores
Source	Rating
AllMusic	4.5/5 stars
Irish Voice	(favorable)
Punknews.org	5/5 stars
The San Diego Union-Tribune	3.5/4 stars

Swagger is the debut studio album by the Celtic punk band Flogging Molly, mixed by Steve Albini. It was released in 2000.

== Reception ==
In a very positive review, AllMusic called Swagger a combination of the "folk of the Pogues with an Oi! blast by way of the Dropkick Murphys". The reviewer went on to call the album "music that's perfect for any barroom brawl." Punknews.org gave the album 5 out of 5 stars and said that "every song is a keeper, without a clunker in the bunch". The review also called "Salty Dog" the "quintessential Flogging Molly song" and noted the album's contrast between aggressive punk-influenced songs and slower ballads like "The Worst Day Since Yesterday".

== In popular culture ==
- "The Worst Day Since Yesterday" was used as the music for the opening and closing montage in Stargate: Universe season 1, episode 9, "Life" (first broadcast November 20, 2009).
- "The Worst Day Since Yesterday" was heard in the background in the bar scene in Mr. and Mrs. Smith.
- "Selfish Man" was used during the closing scene, and over the closing credits, of the fourth episode of Showtime's Brotherhood.
- "The Ol' Beggars Bush" was playing the bar when Dean picked up Rory in the fourth-season episode "Last Week Fights, This Week Tights" of Gilmore Girls.
- "Devil's Dance Floor" was used in Derry Girls, episode 5 of series 1.

== Track listing ==
All lyrics written by Dave King, all musics composed by Flogging Molly, except where noted.

1. "Salty Dog" – 2:21
2. "Selfish Man" – 2:54
3. "The Worst Day Since Yesterday" – 3:38
4. "Every Dog Has Its Day" – 4:24
5. "Life in a Tenement Square" (Dave King, John Donovan, Matt Hensley, Nathen Maxwell, Bridget Regan, Bob Schmidt, George Schwindt) – 3:11
6. "The Ol' Beggars Bush" – 4:34
7. "The Likes of You Again" – 4:33
8. "Black Friday Rule" (King, Ted Hutt, Dennis Casey, Hensley, Maxwell, Regan, Schmidt, Schwindt) – 6:57
9. "Grace of God Go I" – 1:55
10. "Devil's Dance Floor" – 3:59
11. "These Exiled Years" (Dave King, John Donovan, Matt Hensley, Nathen Maxwell, Bridget Regan, Bob Schmidt, George Schwindt) – 5:15
12. "Sentimental Johnny" – 4:47
13. "Far Away Boys" – 5:06

== Personnel ==
- Dave King – lead vocals, acoustic guitar
- Bridget Regan – fiddle, tin whistle
- Matt Hensley – accordion
- Nathen Maxwell – bass guitar
- Bob Schmidt – mandolin, banjo
- George Schwindt – drums, percussion
- John Donovan – electric guitar, acoustic guitar
- Gary Schwindt – trumpet

== Charts ==
Chart (2000)	Peak position
US Billboard 200	128
