= Jig doll =

Traditional toy

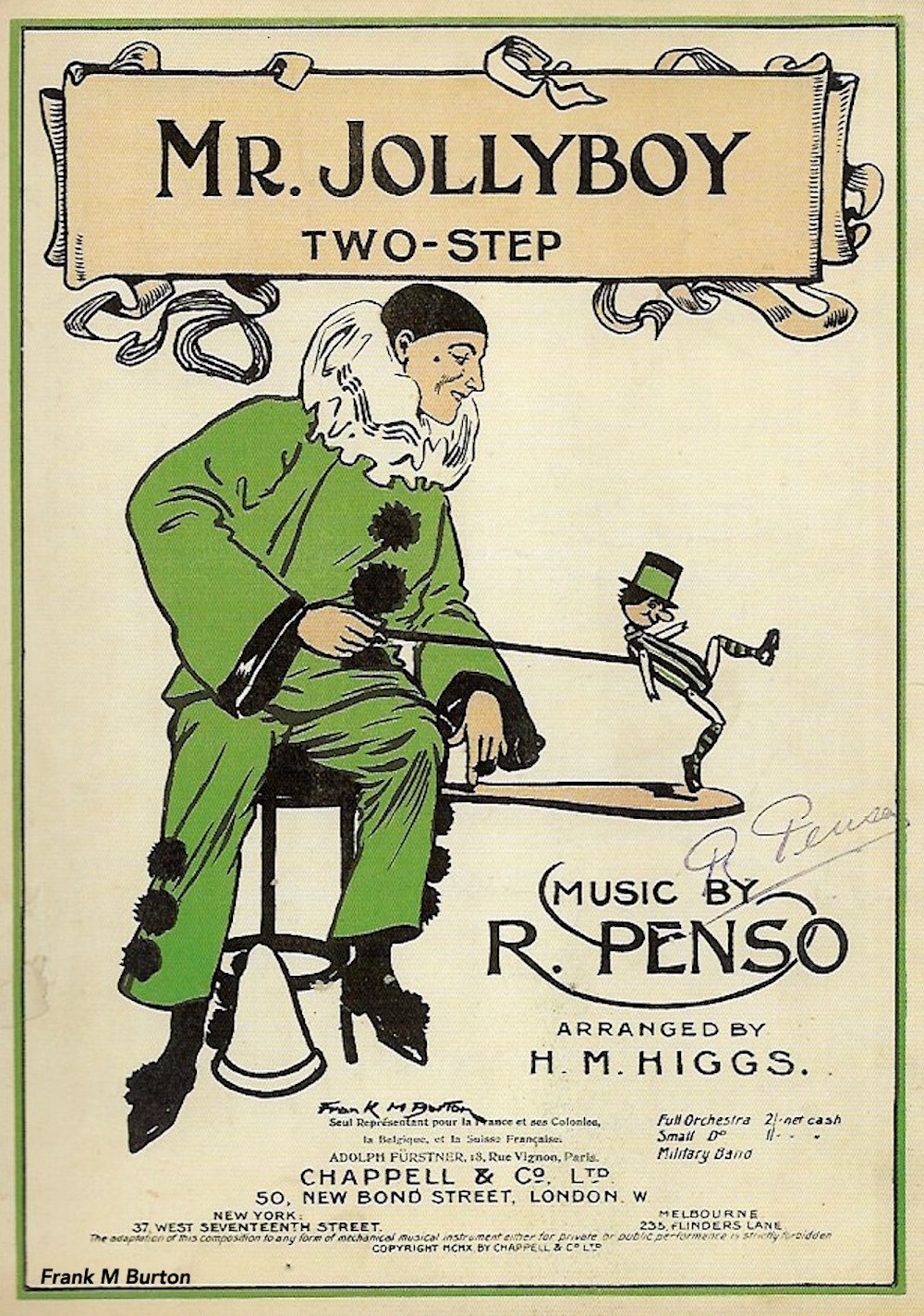
A Pierrot playing with a "Mr. Jollyboy" or jig doll, on the cover of sheet music, c.1910

Jig dolls are traditional wooden or tin-plate toys for adults or children. They are dolls with loose limbs that step dance or 'jig' on the end of a vibrating board or platform in imitation of a real step dancer. In London they were frequently operated by street entertainers or buskers. In England, after the Great War, old soldiers sometimes busked with them to supplement their meagre war pensions. Typically the dolls are between 20–30 cm (8–10 in) tall and are jointed at arms, hips and knees; some also have ankle joints. Today, jig dolls of one kind or another can be seen in the United States, Canada, the UK, Ireland, Europe, parts of Asia, and Australia.

== Alternative names ==
In the UK and Australia, a jig doll usually goes by that name, or any of the following: dancing doll; busker's puppet; clogger; jigger; Mr Jollyboy or Mrs Jollyboy (a commercial version made by Dover Toys, UK), etc. A Mr Jollyboy is in the collection of the Norwich Museum.

In the US, a jig doll would be called a limberjack or limberjill or limbertoy; paddle puppet; stick puppet. A commercial version was called: Dancing Dan or Dancin' Dan; Dapper Dan; Dancing Jo or Dancin' Jo; Stepping Sam or Steppin' Sam, etc.

In French-speaking parts of Canada they are referred to as les gigueux.

In one old patent the term Manipulable Doll was used.

== History ==
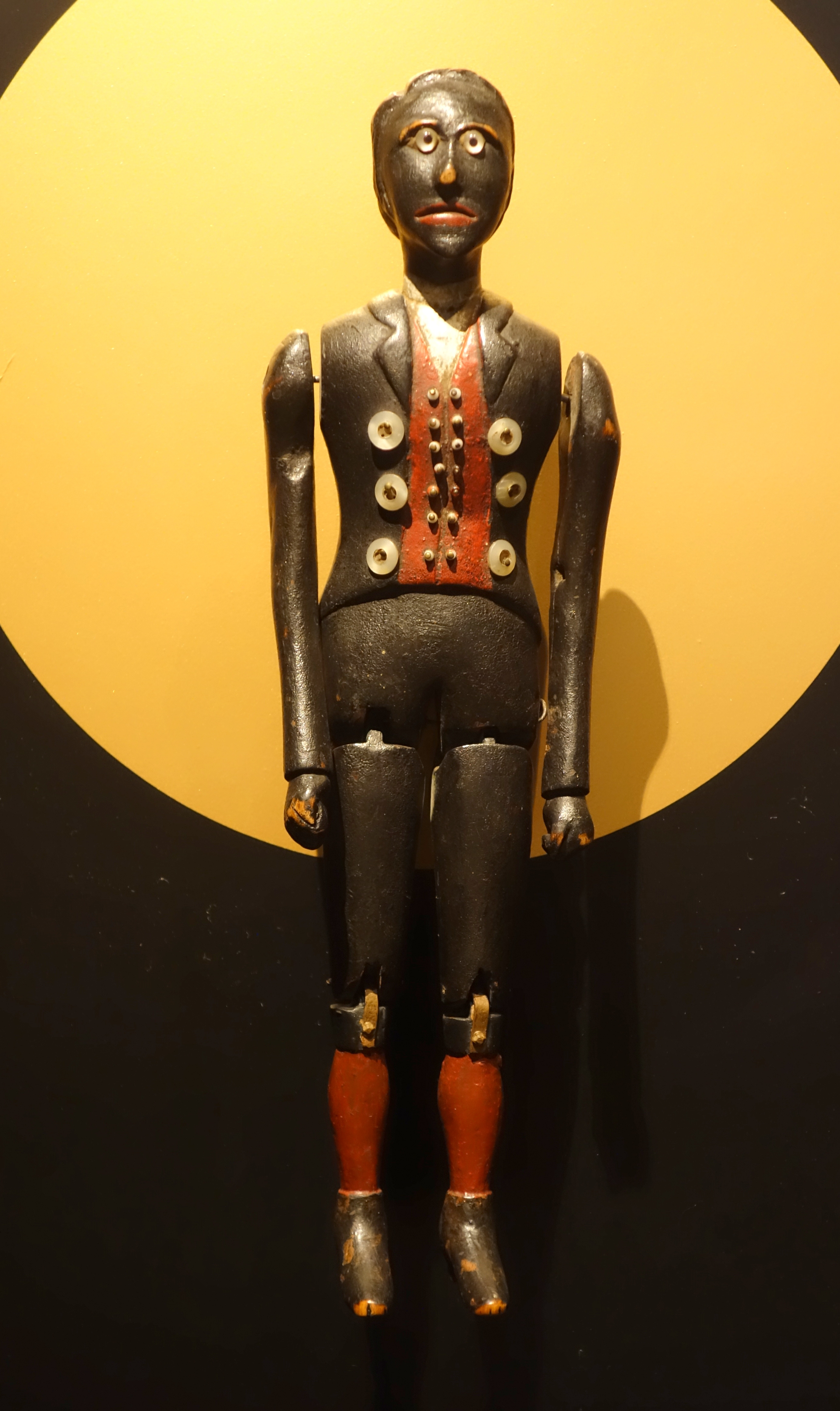
A wooden jig doll, made by Georges Fleuret, 1840, in Akaroa Museum, New Zealand

Dancing dolls have been popular street entertainment for hundreds of years. They are thought to have been brought to England from Italy as early as the sixteenth century; such older versions were known as Poupées à la Planchette or Marionettes à la Planchette. These puppets, operated by a horizontal string attached to the musician's leg, 'danced' on a board on the ground as the musician tapped his foot. They were, and still are, popular street entertainment throughout Europe.

At some stage, possibly in the mid-19th century, the string was replaced by a wooden rod fixed into the back of the body, or attached to a wire loop on the top of the doll's head, with the doll dancing on a vibrating board. Later, some jig dolls were automated.

The East Anglian Traditional Music Trust (EATMT) reports that the earliest jig doll yet discovered is one from the 1851 Great Exhibition at The Crystal Palace. A female figure, dressed in a skirt, petticoat, bodice and shawl, it is now in the Cliffe Castle Museum, Keighley, Yorkshire."

Old ones have become collector's items and can fetch high prices. Some antique clockwork tin-plate 'jiggers' can fetch anything up to £2,000 (in 2009).

Traditional English folk singers and musicians sometimes made their own jig dolls, such as Harry Cox, Billy Bennington and Walter Pardon, all of whom were from Norfolk (East Anglia). The first Norfolk Jig Doll Convention was held in 2016 in tribute to Harry Cox. Jig dolls seem to have survived better in East Anglia than other parts of the country; the EATMT has commissioned a collection of them.

== Variations on the theme ==
Jig dolls are essentially home-made toys. Typical versions could represent sailors, male and/or female costumed folk-dancers, African-Americans, Native Americans, Morris dancers, Punch and Judy, Adolf Hitler, even animals such as frogs, horses, chickens, dogs, and cows, etc. They may be clothed, painted or left as bare polished wood. Sometimes the heads are whittled to show distinctive facial features. Historical figures such as Harry Lauder and more recent ones such as John Major (dancing on a board bearing an image of Margaret Thatcher) have been made.

Some Punch and Judy 'professors' use jig dolls to attract a crowd. One has a jig doll of Charlie Chaplin. In the UK, some folk dance bands have a jig doll to entertain the audience in the interval of a barn dance. Such dolls may occasionally appear at live traditional music sessions in English pubs (in the past, step dancing by members of the audience would have been a common feature of such a pub session).

In Québec and French-speaking Canada, jig dolls can feature as a percussion instrument for a folk dance band, even to the extent of the plank on which a doll 'dances' being fitted with a small microphone connected to the PA system.

== Bibliography ==
- Exner, Carol R.; Practical Puppetry A-Z: A Guide for Librarians and Teachers; McFarland & Co. (31 December 2004) ISBN 978-0786415168
- Pickles, Pat; Howson, Katie; The Brightest of Entertainers: Jig Jolls from Britain and Beyond; East Anglian Traditional Music Trust (13 August 2018) ISBN 978-0954594329

== Films ==
- Appalachian Journey (1990). Recorded and directed by Alan Lomax. Features short clips of homemade limberjacks and several examples of the type of step dancing that they imitate
