= Flogging Molly =

American Celtic punk band

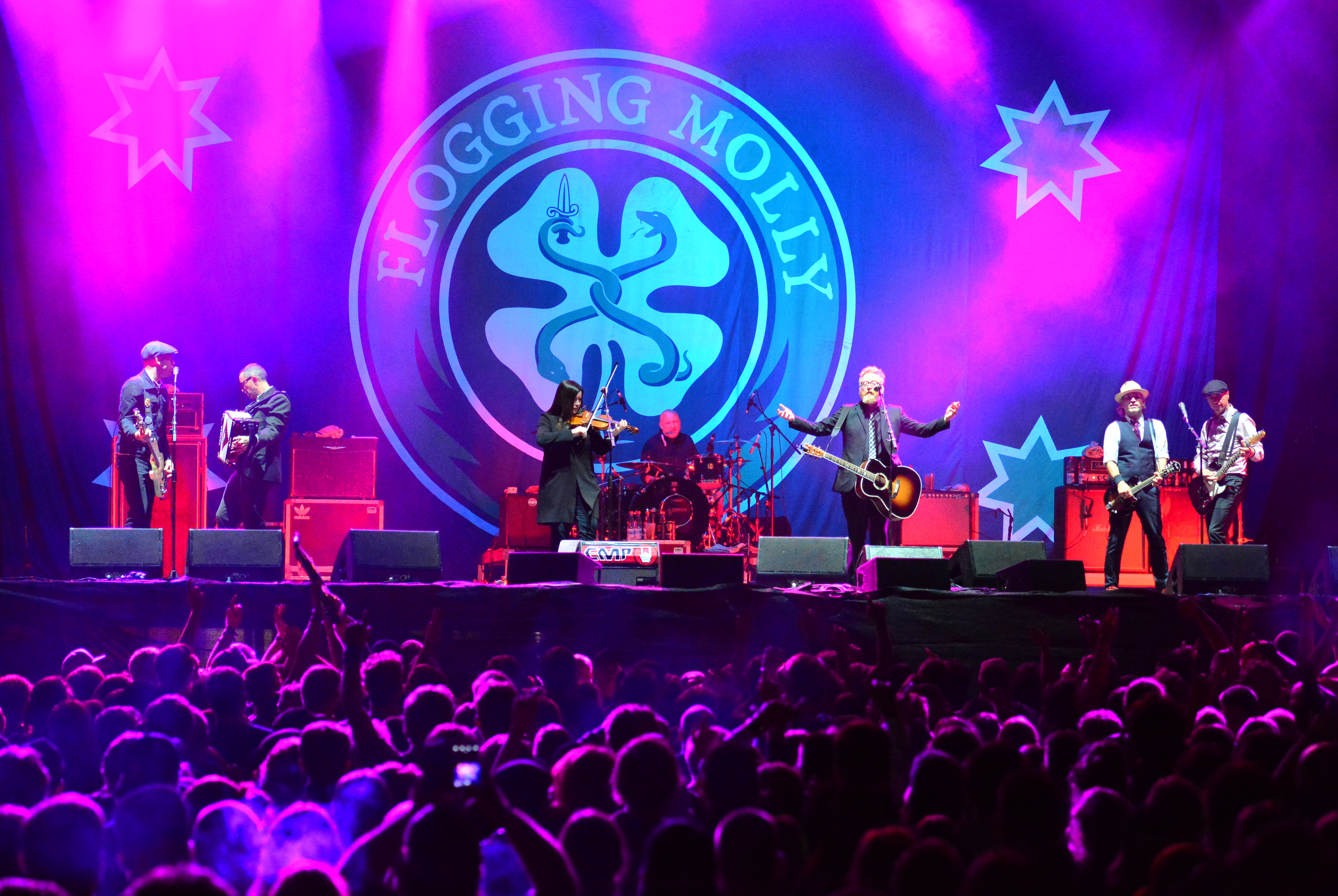
- Flogging Molly in 2015

Background information
- Origin: Los Angeles, California, U.S.
- Genres: Celtic punk, folk punk
- Years active: 1994–present
- Labels: SideOneDummy, Burning Heart, Vanguard, Borstal Beat, Rise
- Members: Dave King; Bridget Regan; Dennis Casey; Nathen Maxwell; Matt Hensley; Mike Alonso; Spencer Swain
- Past members: George Schwindt; Bob Schmidt
- Website: floggingmolly.com

Flogging Molly is an Irish-American seven-piece Celtic punk band formed in Los Angeles in 1994, led by Irish vocalist Dave King, formerly of the hard rock band Fastway. They are signed to their own record label, Borstal Beat Records.

== History ==
=== Early years ===
Before forming Flogging Molly, Dublin-born Dave King was the lead singer for the heavy metal band Fastway featuring guitarist "Fast" Eddie Clarke of Motörhead in the early to mid-1980s. He later fronted a hard rock band called Katmandu (1991), featuring Mandy Meyer of Krokus and Asia on guitars. Afterward, King retained a record deal with Epic Records and began to work on a solo album, but he began to reconsider his record deal when the label opposed his idea of bringing in traditional Irish instruments. King negotiated out of his record deal to go his own way musically soon after.

In 1993, King met violin player Bridget Regan, guitarist Ted Hutt, bassist Jeff Peters and drummer Paul Crowder, and put together a rock band with a Celtic music influence. They began to play a mix of Irish traditional and rock music. Putting King's poetic lyrics to rocking melodies, they played weekly at a Los Angeles pub called Molly Malone's, building a small but loyal following. Together, they wrote songs such as "Black Friday Rule" and "Selfish Man", which was the beginning of Flogging Molly's sound. Ted and Jeff then left Flogging Molly because an earlier band of theirs, Reacharound, received a record deal. King and Regan began to find new members and the current band was formed.

They continued a routine of playing every Monday night at Molly Malone's. They put out a live album, Alive Behind the Green Door, in 1997. In an interview with Kerrang! magazine, King stated that the band's name comes from the bar (Molly Malone's) that faithfully supported the band from the very beginning, "We used to play there every Monday night and we felt like we were flogging it to death, so we called the band Flogging Molly." They were signed to SideOneDummy Records after a show when the record company's owners attended a concert and noted their intensity.

=== Career ===
The band’s debut studio album, Swagger, arrived on March 7, 2000, their first of many with SideOneDummy. They joined the Vans Warped Tour for the first time that summer alongside Green Day, Weezer, and The Mighty Mighty Bosstones (whom they continued touring alongside in the fall).

Drunken Lullabies followed on March 19, 2002, and was certified gold by the RIAA in 2009. They returned to the Warped Tour in 2003 with a lineup that included The All-American Rejects and Dropkick Murphys.

Within a Mile of Home, released on September 14, 2004, debuted at No. 20 on the Billboard 200. The acoustic/live CD/DVD combo, Whiskey on a Sunday, was released in 2006 and certified platinum two years later. It was followed by the 2007 online-only EP, Complete Control Sessions.

The group’s fourth studio album, Float, debuted at No. 4 on the Billboard 200 in 2008 and produced two well-received singles: "Requiem for a Dying Song" (No. 35 on the Billboard Modern Rock charts) and the title track (No. 40).

March 2010's Live at the Greek Theatre captured a career-spanning Los Angeles, California performance from the year before as a CD/DVD set. In 2011, Flogging Molly appeared in the season premiere of Austin City Limits.

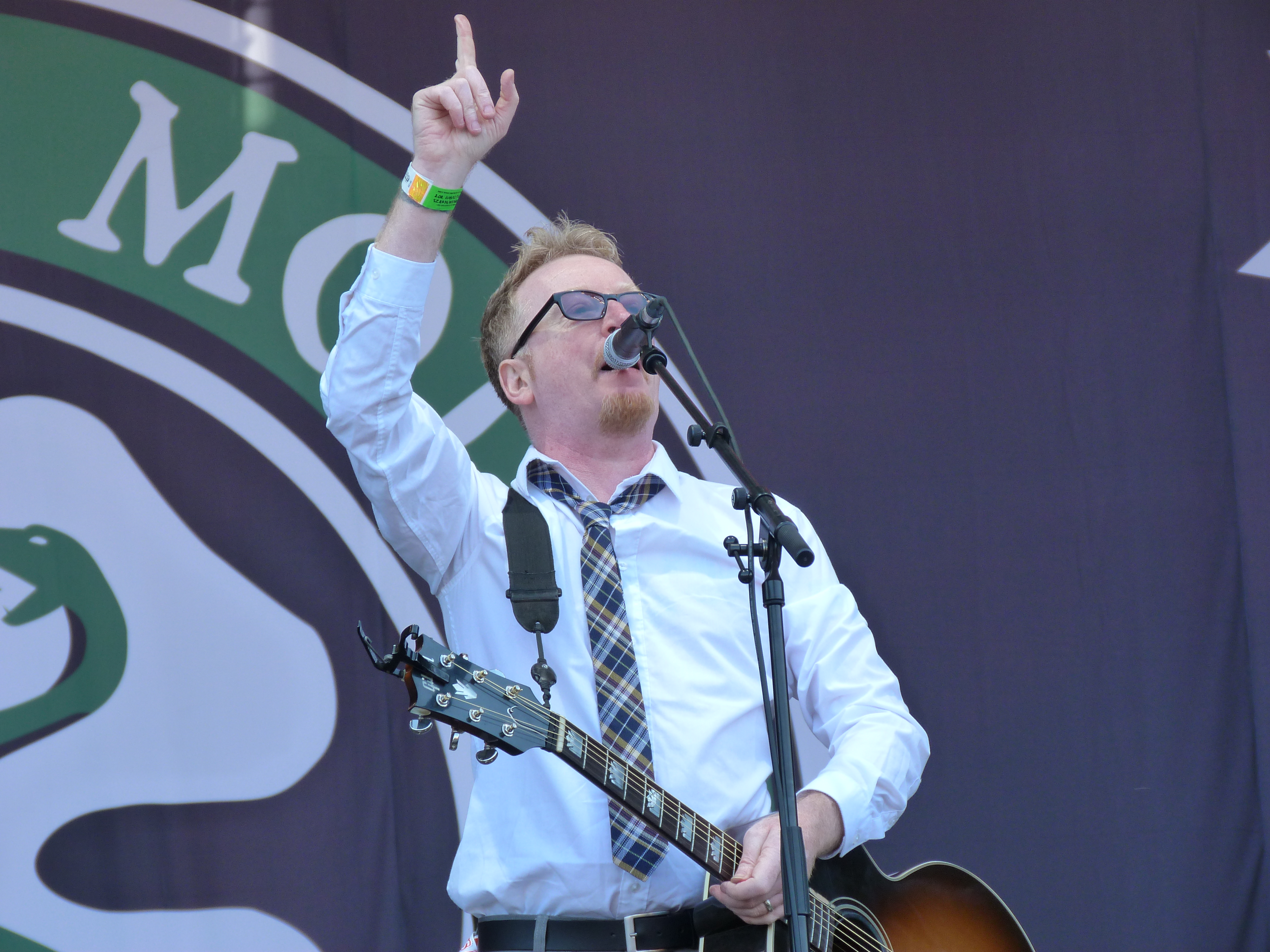
Dave King performing in 2011

2011's Speed of Darkness was the band's first album issued through their own label, Borstal Beat Records.

Life Is Good, the band's first new album in six years, arrived in 2017. It is the only Flogging Molly album released via Vanguard Records and Spinefarm. They co-headlined a US tour with Social Distortion in 2019.

The band live-streamed a St. Patrick's Day performance on March 17, 2021, from Whelan’s Irish Pub in Dublin, Ireland. A portion of the proceeds from ticket sales went toward Sweet Relief’s COVID-19 Crew Fund. They co-headlined a tour with Violent Femmes the same year.

Flogging Molly released their seventh studio album, Anthem, in 2022, their first with Rise Records. They co-headlined a tour with The Interrupters the same year.

In November 2023, the band announced the inaugural Shamrock Rebellion Fest, scheduled for March 16, 2024, in Silverado, California, and March 17, 2024, in Las Vegas, Nevada. The Road To Rebellion Tour preceded the fest, with support coming from Amigo The Devil.

Flogging Molly performed The Pogues' "The Old Main Drag" at the Sinéad & Shane (billed as "a St. Paddy's Celebration of Sinéad O'Connor and Shane MacGowan") at Carnegie Hall concert in New York City on March 20, 2024.

After a June 20, 2024, fire damaged Molly Malone's Irish Pub, where the band got their start, the band launched a merchandise line to raise money for the venue and staff.

The band began a European tour on July 19, 2024, which ran through September, with stops at several major festivals, followed by a headlining tour of the United States from late September through mid-October 2024.

=== Salty Dog Cruises (2015–present) ===
From March 13 to 16, 2015, Flogging Molly began hosting a yearly Caribbean cruise. The 2015 Salty Dog Cruise Cruise featured shows by the band and many others, over three days leaving from Miami to Nassau and Great Stirrup Cay on the Norwegian Sky. All bands performed two times on the stages throughout the ship or on the special stage set on Norwegian's private island of Great Stirrup Cay.

In 2016, from March 18 to 21, the second yearly cruise took the same itinerary on the same ship and hosted, among others, Rancid, Fishbone, Frank Turner, Street Dogs and The Tossers.

In 2017, the Enchantment of the Seas hosted the third annual cruise that left on March 10 to Coco Cay and Nassau, until coming back to Miami on March 13. The guests invited by the band were NOFX, DeVotchKa, Less Than Jake, The English Beat, The Skatalites, The Bouncing Souls, Dylan Walshe and many others.

On August 21, 2017, the band announced that the 2018 cruise would take place April 20–23, leaving from Miami, sailing to Key West and to Great Stirrup Cay. Originally, the cruise was supposed to take place on the Enchantment of the Seas in 2017; however, the ship was changed, and the Norwegian Sky has been announced. The line-up includes The Offspring, Buzzcocks, The Vandals, Lagwagon, and Mad Caddies, among others.

The Salty Dog Cruise 2023 ran November 8–13, sailing from Miami to Harvest Caye, Belize, and Costa Maya, Mexico. The line-up included Flogging Molly, Pennywise, Stiff Little Fingers, The Vandals, and Gorilla Biscuits, among others, with a Port of Miami kickoff show featuring The Interrupters.

In late November 2023, the band announced the next Salty Dog Cruise, set for February 17–22, 2025, sailing from Miami to Grand Cayman, and Ochos Rios, Jamaica. As of December 15, 2023, the 2025 cruise was sold out.

On February 5, 2025, the band announced that they would be forced to cancel their upcoming world tour and also would not be performing on the 2025 Salty Dog Cruise as Dave King was battling a serious health condition. On March 17, on social media, the band announced that King had suffered a brain hemorrhage on January 24th, and underwent two subsequent surgeries to save his life. He had entered the next phase of recovery when the announcement was made.

With King on the mend, the group announced they would be performing again at the 2026 Warped Tour for all five dates along with their 2026 Salty Dog Cruise however on April 8, 2026, the band announced that they were cancelling their appearances at the Warped Tour citing health concerns with King however they still planned to appear on the Salty Dog Cruise. "Hi all. On doctor’s advice, we’ve made the difficult decision to cancel the Warped Tour performances we had scheduled for this year. "We would have loved to have played for you all, but at the moment Dave’s recovery comes first. Thanks to everyone for your love and support, and we look forward to seeing all of your smiling faces on the cruise! Thank you, Flogging Molly" the band said through a social media statement.

== Musical style ==
Flogging Molly's music is influenced by various artists, such as The Dubliners, The Pogues, Horslips, Johnny Cash, and The Clash. The album Within a Mile of Home (2004) is dedicated to the memories of Cash and The Clash frontman Joe Strummer.

Their music ranges from boisterous Celtic punk, like the pirate-themed "Salty Dog", "Cruel Mistress", and "Seven Deadly Sins", or the defiant "What's Left of the Flag", "Drunken Lullabies", and "Rebels of the Sacred Heart", to more somber songs like "Far Away Boys", "The Son Never Shines (On Closed Doors)", "Life in a Tenement Square", and "Float". Lyrics typically touch on subjects such as Ireland and its history, drinking, poverty, politics, love, and death and include several references to the Catholic Church. "What's Left of the Flag" and "The Likes of You Again" were written as tributes to King's father, who died when King was a child.

== Members ==
Current

- Dave King – lead vocals, acoustic guitar, bodhrán, banjo, spoons
- Bridget Regan – violin, tin whistle, backing and lead vocals
- Dennis Casey – guitar, vocals
- Matt Hensley – accordion, concertina
- Nathen Maxwell – bass guitar, vocals
- Spencer Swain – mandolin, banjo, guitar, vocals
- Mike Alonso – drums, percussion

Former

- John Donovan – guitar
- Tobe McCallum – mandolin
- Ted Hutt – guitar
- Jeff Peters – bass
- Paul Crowder – drums
- Gary Sullivan – drums
- George Schwindt – drums
- Bob Schmidt – mandolin, banjo, bouzouki, guitar, vocals

== Discography ==
=== Studio albums ===
- Swagger (2000)
- Drunken Lullabies (2002)
- Within a Mile of Home (2004)
- Float (2008)
- Speed of Darkness (2011)
- Life Is Good (2017)
- Anthem (2022)
