= Dave King (singer) =

American singer (born 1961)

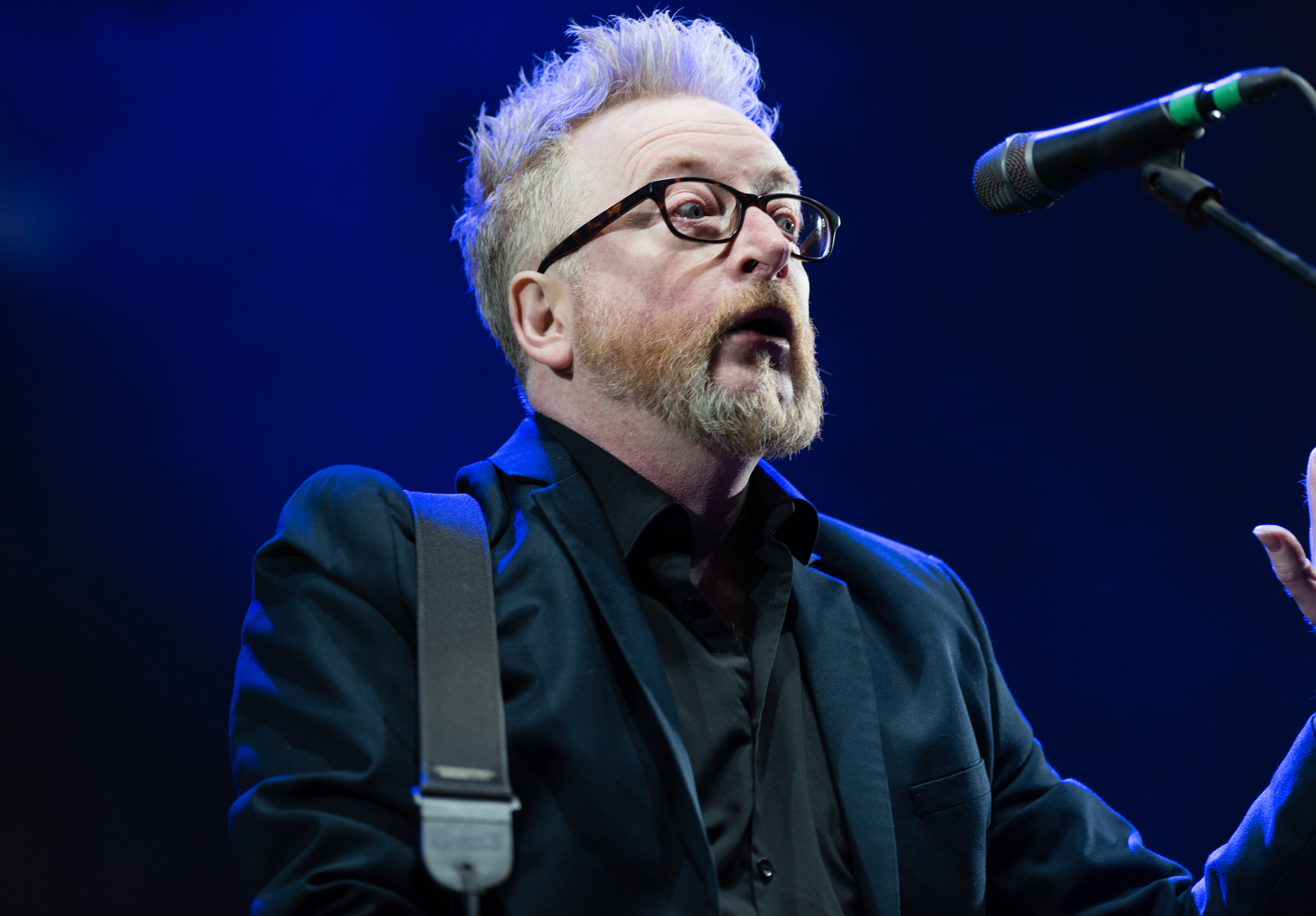
- Dave King in 2018

Background information
- Born: Dublin, Ireland
- Genres: Celtic punk, folk punk, hard rock
- Occupations: Singer, songwriter, musician
- Instruments: Vocals, guitar, bodhrán, banjo
- Years active: 1982–present

Dave King (born in Dublin) is an Irish singer, musician and songwriter.

He first gained notability as the original lead singer of hard rock band Fastway in the 1980s, and co-founded the Celtic punk band Flogging Molly in 1997.

== Roots and early life ==
King grew up in a small two-room flat in Beggars Bush, Dublin that had once been part of Beggars Bush Barracks. When he was around the age of six or seven, his parents bought him a guitar. King remembers being called inside by his mother to watch David Bowie perform "Starman" on television, which he cites as one of many influences along with Luke Kelly, Joe Strummer, Johnny Cash, and Freddie Mercury to name a few. King's father died when he was 10 years old. He left Dublin in his twenties, residing in London where he first joined Fastway and later Los Angeles where he formed Flogging Molly with Ted Hutt, Jeff Peters, and Bridget Regan.

== Career ==
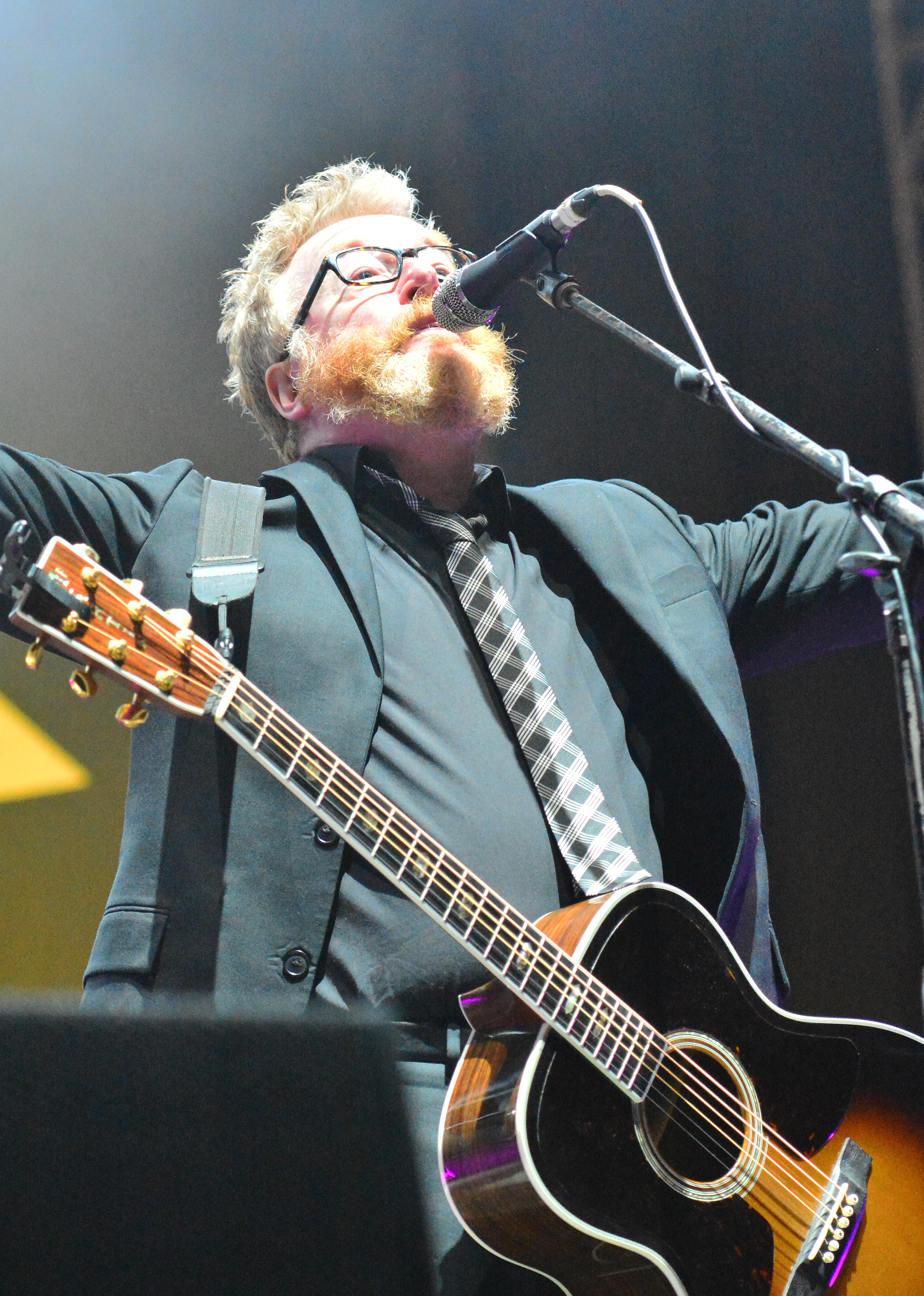
King with Flogging Molly at Reload Festival, 2015

King's professional career began in the early 1980s when he was hired as the vocalist for Fastway, a British hard rock band formed by ex-Motörhead guitarist "Fast" Eddie Clarke and ex-UFO bassist Pete Way in 1983.

After Fastway, King formed Katmandu with Mandy Meyer (ex-Krokus) and Mike Alonso (former member of the Detroit-based band Speedball), who released one self-titled album. The band had a couple of minor hits but later disbanded.

King retained a record deal with Epic Records, who wanted him to sing for Jeff Beck, but he declined. He cofounded Flogging Molly and asked to be released from his Epic contract.

Flogging Molly continues to record and tour, reaching No. 4 on the Billboard 200 and No. 1 on the Billboard Indie Chart over the years.

On March 20, 2024, Dave and Flogging Molly covered The Pogues' "The Old Main Drag" at the Sinéad & Shane (billed as "a St. Paddy's Celebration of Sinéad O'Connor and Shane MacGowan") at Carnegie Hall concert in New York City.

Flogging Molly followed up their summer 2024 European tour with a headlining run in the US in September/October.

== Personal life ==
King is married to musician and bandmate Bridget Regan. On February 5, 2025, the band announced the cancellation of their ongoing tour due to King suffering from a 'very serious health condition.' On March 17, 2025, King’s wife, Bridget, posted to social media announcing that King had had undergone multiple surgeries after suffering a brain hemorrhage, before spending two weeks in a coma, and that he was recovering at the Beaumont Hospital in Dublin.

With King on the mend, the group announced they would be performing again at the 2026 Warped Tour for all five dates along with their 2026 Salty Dog Cruise. However, on April 8, 2026, the band announced that they were cancelling their appearances at the Warped Tour citing health concerns with King but stated they still planned to appear on the Salty Dog Cruise.
