= Celtic punk =

Punk rock mixed with traditional Celtic music

- Stylistic origins: Punk rock; British folk rock; folk punk; Celtic music; Celtic rock; Irish rebel music
- Cultural origins: 1980s, London, England: Irish folk and punk rock scenes

Regional scenes
- London; Ireland; Wales; Scotland; Australia; United States

Other topics
- Celtic fusion; Scottish Gaelic punk; Celtic metal

Celtic punk is punk rock mixed with traditional Celtic music. Celtic punk bands often play traditional Celtic folk songs, contemporary/political folk songs, and original compositions. Common themes in Celtic punk music include politics, Celtic culture (particularly Gaelic culture) and identity, heritage, religion, drinking and working class pride.

The genre was popularised in the 1980s by the Pogues. It is considered part of the broader folk punk genre, although that term is often used in North America for acoustic forms of punk rock rather than a mixture of traditional folk music and punk rock. The genre was reinforced in the 2000s by bands such as Dropkick Murphys and Flogging Molly.

The typical Celtic punk band includes rock instrumentation as well as traditional instruments such as bagpipes, fiddle, tin whistle, accordion, mandolin, and banjo. Like Celtic rock, Celtic punk is a form of Celtic fusion.

While popular around the world, Celtic punk is often criticised for certain non-Irish bands appropriating and misrepresenting Irish culture (perpetuating 'Plastic Paddy' stereotypes) with an excessive focus on drinking and fighting. Other folk-punk bands that incorporate traditional folk material, such as The Dreadnoughts and Cordelia's Dad, have expressed disdain at being called 'Celtic punk' despite Celtic material making up a very small portion of their overall material (either due to the common occurrence of non-Celtic folk songs being called 'Celtic,' or due to the misunderstanding that all traditional folk music mixed with punk rock is Celtic punk).

== History ==
Celtic punk's origins date back to 1960s and 1970s folk rock musicians who played Irish folk music and Celtic rock in the UK, as well as in more traditional Celtic folk bands such as the Dubliners and the Clancy Brothers. The Scottish band the Skids were possibly the first UK punk band to add a strong folk music element, as they did on their 1981 album Joy. Around the same time in London, Shane MacGowan and Spider Stacy began experimenting with a sound that became the Pogues, which most consider to be the prototypical Celtic punk band. Their early sets included a mixture of traditional folk songs and original songs written in a traditional style but performed in a punk style. Other early Celtic punk bands included Nyah Fearties, Australia's Roaring Jack and Norway's Greenland Whalefishers.

The 1990s gave rise to a Celtic punk movement in North America, centered around the likes of the Dropkick Murphys of Quincy, Massachusetts, and Chicago's The Tossers – both from cities with particularly large population of Irish Americans – as well as LA's Flogging Molly (founded by Irish emigrant Dave King) and The Real McKenzies of Vancouver, B.C.. North American Celtic punk bands have been influenced by American forms of music, and commonly sing in English.

== Fashion ==
Like other punk subcultures, Celtic punk has its own fashions as well. Similar to the music, Celtic punk fashion is a mixture of standard punk fashion and traditional Celtic clothing, most notably (and sometimes erroneously) tartans. Standard items in Celtic punk fashion include leather jackets, tartans, chains, studs, kilts, and mohawks. The favored tartan among punks in 70s–80s Britain was the Royal Stewart tartan, due to both its widespread availability and perceived anti-establishment connotations.

== Language ==
The Scottish Gaelic punk scene can be considered a part of the larger Celtic punk subculture, as even though most bands from that scene did not incorporate traditional sounds into their music, they sang in Scottish Gaelic in support of their traditional language and in protest of linguistic homogenization (among many other issues). They taught each other the language in DIY classes called 'Gaelic for Punks', and the scene was centered around the Sabhal Mòr Ostaig college on the Isle of Skye, Scotland.

== See also ==
- Celtic metal
- List of folk rock artists § Celtic punk
- Scottish Gaelic punk
