= Hawkwind discography =

- Studio albums: 35
- Extended plays: 8
- Live albums: 13
- Compilation albums: 17
- Singles: 22

The discography of the British space rock group Hawkwind spans from their formation in 1969 through to the present day, with consistent output of live and studio albums, EPs and singles. The group have used aliases to release some albums in an attempt to either redefine themselves, as with the 1978 album 25 Years On released under the name Hawklords, or simply to distinguish the piece of work from their usual output, as with White Zone released under the name Psychedelic Warriors.

From 1970 through to 1975, the group were contracted to Liberty/UA producing their most commercially successful and critically acclaimed work, five studio albums, the UK top 10 live album Space Ritual and five singles, including the UK top 3 single "Silver Machine". This catalogue of works is now owned by EMI and is still in print.

The mid-late 1970s saw them produce four studio albums under contract to Charisma. In the early 1980s, they produced a studio album and live album under contract to Bronze in 1980, then three studio albums for Rockfield Studios owner Kingsley Ward's Active/RCA. Since then, the band have recorded for numerous independent labels, including Flicknife, their former manager Douglas Smith's label GWR, Essential (through Castle Communications), and from 1994 to 1997 their own label EBS administered by Smith.

The catalogue from this 1976–97 period has passed through various record companies and seen numerous releases, in North America through Griffin, and some counterfeit copies on the German label Rock Fever. It was secured by Cherry Red in the UK for their Atomhenge imprint in 2008 and has been re-issued with the inclusion of previously unreleased bonus tracks.

Between 1999 and 2007, the band released both new and archive material through Voiceprint, this catalogue now being out of print.

At the beginning of 1980, Dave Brock started collating material from his archives and issuing cassette tape albums under the imprint Weird Records. He would subsequently license these recordings to various independent record companies, such as Flicknife, former bass player Dave Anderson's American Phonograph, the then band manager Jim White's Samurai and later Voiceprint. This material has been subject to many retitling, repackaging and re-issuing through different labels, leading to multitudes of cheap titles of which the band have no control.

== Albums ==
This section contains official (i.e. contractual and contemporaneous) albums that Hawkwind have recorded live or in the studio for release. It has long been a practice of theirs to incorporate live recordings (albeit with studio overdubs) of previously unreleased tracks on studio albums (for example Hall of the Mountain Grill), and studio recordings of previously unreleased tracks on live albums (for example Palace Springs). Compilation albums listed are those that have been compiled by record labels that had Hawkwind under contract to produce a series of albums.

=== Studio ===
Year	Title	Label, Cat.no.	Chart positions			Notes
Year	Title	Label, Cat.no.	UK	AUS	US	Notes
1970	Hawkwind	Liberty, LBS83348	75		–	
1971	In Search of Space	United Artists, UAG29202	18	34		UK : Gold
1972	Doremi Fasol Latido	United Artists, UAG29364	14		–	
1974	Hall of the Mountain Grill	United Artists, UAG29672	16	92	110	studio with some live tracks – UK : Silver
1975	Warrior on the Edge of Time	United Artists, UAG29766	13	91	150	UK : Silver
1976	Astounding Sounds, Amazing Music	Charisma, CDS4004	33		–	
1977	Quark, Strangeness and Charm	Charisma, CDS4008	30	–		
1978	25 Years On	Charisma, CDS4014	48	–		Released under the name "Hawklords"
1979	PXR5	Charisma, CDS4016	59	–		studio with some live tracks, recorded 1977
1980	Levitation	Bronze, BRON530	21	–		
1981	Sonic Attack	RCA/Active, RCALP6004	19	–		
1982	Church of Hawkwind	RCA/Active, RCALP9004	26	–		Released under the name "Church of Hawkwind"
1982	Choose Your Masques	RCA/Active, RCALP6055	29	–		
1985	The Chronicle of the Black Sword	Flicknife, SHARP033	65	–		
1988	The Xenon Codex	GWR, GWLP29	79	–		
1990	Space Bandits	GWR, GWLP103	70	–		
1992	Electric Tepee	Essential, ESD181	53	–		
1993	It Is the Business of the Future to Be Dangerous	Essential, ESD196	75	–		
1995	White Zone	EBS, EBS113		–		Released under the name "Psychedelic Warriors"
1995	Alien 4	EBS, EBS118	119	–		
1997	Distant Horizons	EBS, EBS139		–		
1998	In Your Area	Griffin Music, GCD7402		–		live and studio
2000	Spacebrock	Voiceprint, HAWKVP18CD		–		Dave Brock solo album released as Hawkwind
2005	Take Me to Your Leader	Voiceprint, HAWKVP35CD		–		
2006	Take Me to Your Future	Voiceprint, HAWKVP38DD		–		Dual Disc: studio audio and live video
2010	Blood of the Earth	Eastworld, EWO042CD		–		
2012	Onward	Eastworld, EW0101CD	75	–		
2012	Stellar Variations	Esoteric, EANTCD1008		–		Released under the name "Hawkwind Light Orchestra"
2016	The Machine Stops	Cherry Red, BRED688	29	–		
2017	Into the Woods	Cherry Red, BRED700	34	–		
2018	Road to Utopia	Cherry Red, BRED730	44	–		
2019	All Aboard the Skylark	Cherry Red, BRED782	34	–		
2020	Carnivorous	Cherry Red, BRED822	61	–		Released under the name "Hawkwind Light Orchestra"
2021	Somnia	Cherry Red, BRED845	57	–		
2023	The Future Never Waits	Cherry Red, BRED884	62	–		
2024	Stories from Time and Space	Cherry Red, BRED901	51			
2025	There Is No Space for Us	Cherry Red, BRED924	46			

=== Live ===
Year	Title	Label, Cat.No.	Chart positions		Notes
Year	Title	Label, Cat.No.	UK	US	Notes
1973	The Space Ritual Alive	United Artists, UAD60037/8	9	179	10cd+BR, UK : Silver
1980	Live Seventy Nine	Bronze, BRON527	15		
1986	Live Chronicles	GWR, GWS1			
1991	Palace Springs	GWR, GWLP104			live with some studio tracks
1994	The Business Trip	EBS, EBS111			live with some studio tracks
1996	Love in Space	EBS, EBS120			
2001	Yule Ritual	Voiceprint, HAWKVP19CD			
2002	Canterbury Fayre 2001	Voiceprint, HAWKVP22CD			
2008	Knights of Space	Vision Music, 74489			
2015	Space Ritual Live	Gonzo Media, HAWKGZ104SE			Space Ritual 40th anniversary show
2017	At the Roundhouse	Cherry Red, BRED721			
2020	50 Live	Cherry Red, BRED830			Band's 50th anniversary show at Royal Albert Hall
2022	We Are Looking in on You	Cherry Red, BRED864			
2024	Live at the Royal Albert Hall	Cherry Red, BRED917			Space Ritual 50th anniversary show

=== Compilation ===
Year	Title	Label, Cat.No.	UK#	Notes
1976	Roadhawks	United Artists, UAK29919	45	covers 1970–75 – UK : Silver
1977	Masters of the Universe	United Artists, UAG30025		covers 1971–74
1980	Repeat Performance	Charisma, BG2		covers 1976–78
1983	Zones	Flicknife, SHARP014	#45	live and demos 1980 to 1982
1986	Angels of Death	RCA/Active, NL71150		covers 1981–82
1987	Out & Intake	Flicknife, SHARP040		live and studio out-takes 1982 and 1986
1988	Spirit of the Age	Virgin, COMCD8		covers 1976–78
1990	Stasis (The UA Years 1971 – 1975)	EMI, CZ297		covers 1971–74
1992	Tales from Atom Henge	Virgin, CDVM9008		covers 1976–78
1992	Psychedelic Warlords	Cleopatra, 95741		
1994	25 Years On	Griffin Music, GCD-299-0		4CD covers 1970–1994, included four unreleased tracks
1999	Epocheclipse – 30 Year Anthology	EMI, 21751		3CD covers 1969–99
1999	Epocheclipse – The Ultimate Best Of	EMI, 21747		covers 1969–99
2002	Masters of Rock	EMI, 37765		covers 1970–75, includes two new 2001 live tracks
2006	The Collection	EMI, 3592182		covers 1970–74
2008	Spirit of the Age	Atomhenge, ATOMBOX3002		3CD covers 1976–84
2008	The Dream Goes On	Atomhenge, ATOMBOX3003		3CD covers 1985–97
2013	Spacehawks	Eastworld, EW0138		Composed largely of re-recorded and remixed material.
2022	Dust of Time – An Anthology	Atomhenge, ATOMCD61048		6CD covers 1968–2021
2026	Psychedelic Selection	Cherry Red, BRED939		Unreleased, re-recorded, and new material, covering 2012-2026

== Singles and EPs ==
The singles and EPs listed here, in the main, are all of those that went on general release in the UK. There are a couple of overseas releases included as they are significant in that their A-side and/or B-side were unavailable in the UK.

=== EPs ===
- 1984 – The Earth Ritual Preview EP: "Night of the Hawk" / "Green Finned Demon"; "Dream Dancers"; "Dragons & Fables" (Flicknife, FLEP104, 12")
- 1993 – Decide Your Future EP: "Right to Decide"; "The Camera That Could Lie"; "Right to Decide (Radio Edit Mix)"; "Assassin (Magick Carpet Mix)" (4-Real, 4R2, 12" & CD)
- 1994 – Quark, Strangeness and Charm EP: "Uncle Sam's on Mars (Red Planet Radio Mix)"; "Quark, Strangeness and Charm"; "Black Sun"; "Uncle Sam's on Mars (Martian Conquest Mix)" (EBS, EBCD110, 12" & CD)
- 1995 – Area S4 EP: "Alien (I Am)"; "Sputnik Stan" (12" only); "Death Trap"; "Wastelands of Sleep"; "Are You Losing Your Mind?" (EBS, EBCD107, 12" & CD)

=== Singles ===
- 1970 – "Hurry On Sundown" / "Mirror of Illusion" (Liberty, LBF15382, 7")
- 1972 – "Silver Machine" / "Seven By Seven" (United Artists, UP35381, 7", UK#3). Re-released 1976 (7"), 1978 (7" & 12", UK#34) and 1982 (7", 7" pic disc & 12", UK#67)
- 1973 – "Lord of Light" / "Born to Go (Live)" (United Artists, UA35492, 7", German)
- 1973 – "Urban Guerrilla" / "Brainbox Pollution" (United Artists, UP35566, 7", UK#39) Withdrawn after 3 weeks of release.
- 1974 – "You'd Better Believe It" / "Paradox" (United Artists, UP35689, 7", France)
- 1974 – "The Psychedelic Warlords" / "It's So Easy" (United Artists, UP35715, 7")
- 1975 – "Kings of Speed" / "Motorhead" (United Artists, UP35808, 7")
- 1976 – "Kerb Crawler" / "Honky Dorky" (Charisma, CB289, 7")
- 1977 – "Back on the Streets" / "The Dream of Isis" (Charisma, CB299, 7")
- 1977 – "Quark, Strangeness and Charm" / "The Forge of Vulcan" (Charisma, CB305, 7")
- 1978 – "Psi Power" / "Death Trap" (Charisma, CB323, 7")
- 1979 – "25 Years" / "PXR5" (12" only) / "(Only) The Dead Dreams of the Cold War Kid" (Charisma, CB332, 7" & 12")
- 1980 – "Shot Down in the Night (Live)" / "Urban Guerrilla (Live)" (Bronze, BRO98, 7", UK#59)
- 1980 – "Who's Gonna Win the War?" / "Nuclear Toy" (Bronze, BRO109, 7")
- 1981 – "Angels of Death" / "Trans Dimensional Man" (RCA/Active, RCA137, 7")
- 1982 – "Silver Machine" / "The Psychedelic Warlords"; "Silver Machine (Full Version)" (RCA/Active, RCA267, 7" & 7" pic disc)
- 1984 – "Night of the Hawk" / "Green Finned Demon" (Flicknife, FLS104, 7")
- 1985 – "Needle Gun" / "Song of the Swords" (12" only); "Arioch" (Flicknife, FLS032, 7" & 12")
- 1986 – "Zarozinia" / "Assault and Battery"; "Sleep of 1000 Tears" (12" only) (Flicknife, FLS033, 7" & 12")
- 1997 – "Love in Space"; "Lord of Light"; "Sonic Attack" (EBS, EBCD106, CD)
- 2004 – CD1: "Spirit of the Age (Radio Edit)"; "Angela Android (live)"; "Assassins of Allah (live)" / CD2: "Spirit of the Age (live)"; "Paradox (new version)" (Voiceprint, HAWKVP55CD1/2, CD)
- 2014 – "Sonic Attack" (new version featuring Brian Blessed) (Cherry Red, CDr, promo only)
- 2016 – "Solitary Man" / "Tunnels of Darkness" (Cherry Red, CHERRY520)

== Archive releases ==
This section lists those Hawkwind albums, EPs and singles that have been compiled and released from previously unissued archive tapes, be it live, studio out-takes or demo material. All of the releases listed here are the original ones; retitles, re-releases and derivatives have purposefully been omitted. Only one release, Bring Me the Head of Yuri Gagarin, was not approved for release by Dave Brock.

=== Albums ===
Year	Title	Label, Cat.No.	Notes
1980	Weird Tape Volume 1	Weird, 101	Sonic Assassins live 1977, Dave Brock demos 1979
1980	Weird Tape Volume 2	Weird, 102	live 1977, Hawklords demos 1979
1981	Weird Tape Volume 3	Weird, 103	live 1977, live 1975
1981	Weird Tape Volume 4	Weird, 104	live 1978
1982	Weird Tape Volume 5	Weird, 105	live 1976, live 1977
1982	Weird Tape Volume 6	Weird, 106	BBC session 1970–71, live 1972
1983	Weird Tape Volume 7	Weird, 107	Dave Brock demos 1979–82
1983	Weird Tape Volume 8	Weird, 108	BBC session 1971, demos 1975, Dave Brock 1967
1983	The Text of Festival	Illuminated, JAMS29	live and BBC Sessions 1970–71
1984	This Is Hawkwind, Do Not Panic	Flicknife, SHARP022, UK#101	live 1980 and 1984
1984	Space Ritual Volume 2	American Phonograph, APK8	live 1972
1985	Bring Me the Head of Yuri Gagarin	Demi Monde, DM002	live 1973
1985	Hawkwind Anthology	Samurai, SAMR038/039/040	live and studio out-takes 1967–82
1991	BBC Radio 1 Live in Concert	Windsong, WINCD007	live 1972
1992	The Friday Rock Show Sessions	Raw Fruit, FRSCD005	live 1986
1992	Hawklords Live	Hawkdiscs, DOJOCD7	live 1978
1992	California Brainstorm	Iloki, ILCD 1014	live 1990
1995	Undisclosed Files Addendum	EBS, EBS114	live 1984 and 1988
1997	The 1999 Party	EMI, HAWKS6	live 1974
1999	Glastonbury 90	Voiceprint, HAWKVP1CD	live 1990
1999	Complete '79: Collector Series Volume 1	Voiceprint, HAWKVP4CD	live 1979
1999	Thrilling Hawkwind Adventures	Griffin Music, GCD8402	live 1976
2000	Atomhenge 76	Voiceprint, HAWKVP5CD	live 1976
2002	Live 1990	Voiceprint, HAWKVP12CD	live 1990
2008	Minneapolis, 4th October 1989	Voiceprint, HAWKVP45CD	live 1989
2009	Choose Your Masques: Collectors Series Volume 2	Voiceprint, HAWKVP3CD	live 1982
2009	Reading University, 19th May 1992	Voiceprint, HAWKVP46CD	live 1992
2009	Live '78	Atomhenge, ATOMCD1014	live 1978
2009	Winter Solstice 2005	Voiceprint, HAWKVP44CD	Soundtrack from the DVD Winter Solstice 2005
2010	Treworgey Tree Fayre 1989	Voiceprint, HAWKVP47CD	Soundtrack from the DVD Treworgey Tree Fayre
2010	San Francisco 1990	Voiceprint, HAWKVP48CD	Soundtrack from the DVD USA Tour 1989–1990
2010	At The BBC – 1972	EMI, HAWKS7	BBC live and studio sessions, 1972
2011	Leave No Star Unturned	Easy Action, EARS041	live 27 January 1972
2011	Parallel Universe	EMI, HAWKS8	3CD compilation 1970-4, includes previously unreleased out-takes
2022	Dreamworkers of Time – The BBC Recordings 1985–1995	Atomhenge, ATOMCD31049	3CD live 1986 and 1988, radio sessions 1985 and 1995
2023	Days of the Underground (The Studio & Live Recordings 1977–1979)	Atomhenge, ATOMCD101050	8CD/2BR remixes of Quark Strangeness and Charm, PXR5 and 25 years On; studio out-takes; live performances

=== EPs ===
- 1981 – Hawkwind Zoo EP: "Hurry on Sundown" / "Sweet Mistress of Pain" [a.k.a. "Kiss of the Velvet Whip"]; "Kings of Speed" (Flicknife, FLEP100, 12") – demos 1969, out-take 1975
- 1981 – Sonic Assassins EP: "Over the Top" / "Freefall"; "Death Trap" (Flicknife, FLEP101, 12") – live 1977
- 1990 – The Early Years Live EP: "Silver Machine"; "Spirit of the Age" / "Urban Guerilla"; "Born to Go" (Receiver, REPLAY 3014, 12")

=== Singles ===
- 1981 – "Motorhead" / "Valium 10" (Flicknife, FLS205, 7"&12") – out-take 1975, demo 1979
- 1982 – "Who's Gonna Win the War?" / "Time of the Hawklords" (Flicknife, FLS209, 7") – demo 1979
- 1983 – "Motorway City" / "Master of the Universe" (Flicknife, FLS025, 7") – live 1980
- 1986 – "Silver Machine" / "Magnu"; "Angels of Life" (Samurai, HW001, 7" 12" & pic disc)

== Various artists compilations ==
This section contains Various Artists compilations that contain Hawkwind material that was unavailable elsewhere.

=== Albums ===
Year	Title	Label, Cat.No.	Notes
1972	Glastonbury Fayre	Revelation, REV1	includes "Silver Machine", "Welcome to the Future"
1972	Greasy Truckers Party	United Artists, UDX 203/4	includes "Master of the Universe", "Born to Go"
1982	Hawkwind, Friends and Relations Volume 1	Flicknife, SHARP101	includes "Who's Gonna Win the War?" (demo 1979); "Robot" (live 1977); "Valium 10" (demo 1979)
1982	Hawkwind, Friends and Relations Volume 2	Flicknife, SHARP107	includes "Earth Calling" (live 1972); "We Do It" (BBC Session 1971); "Spirit of the Age" (live 1977)
1982	Hawkwind, Friends and Relations Volume 3	Flicknife, SHARP024	includes "Psychedelia Lives" (live 1981); "Drug Cabinet Key" (a.k.a. "Flying Doctor") (live 1978)
1988	Travellers Aid Trust	Flicknife, SHARP2045	includes "Brainstorm", "Blue Dreamer"
1993	The Best of Hawkwind, Friends and Relations	Anagram/Flicknife, CDMGRAM61	includes "Spirit of the Age" (live 1977); "Robot" (live 1977); "Sweet Mistress of Pain" (demo 1969); "Social Alliance" (live 1982); "Psi Power" (live 1980)
1995	Hawkwind, Friends and Relations: The Rarities	Anagram/Flicknife, CDMGRAM91	includes includes "Psychedelia Lives" (live 1981); "Earth Calling" (live 1972)
1996	Hawkwind Friends and Relations Volume 6 – Cosmic Travellers	Anagram/Flicknife, CDMGRAM105	includes "Time of the Hawklords" (demo 1978)
1998	The Elf & the Hawk	Black Widow, BWRCD026-2	includes "Countdown"; "Ejection"; "Ghost Dance"
2003	Hawkfest 2002	Voiceprint, HAWKVP100CD	includes "Night of the Hawks"
2007	Greasy Truckers Party	EMI, 0999 503235 2 4	3CD re-issue, includes full set
2022	Dave Brock Presents... This Was Your Future - Space Rock (And Other Psychedelics) 1978 - 1998	Cherry Red, CRCDBOX122	3CD, includes "PXR5" (studio album version)
2026	Hawkwind: Friends & Relations Vol 6	Cherry Red, BRED954	includes "We Fight For Glory" and "The Co-Pilot"

=== EPs ===
- 1993 – Gimme Shelter (Rock) EP: (EMI, 7243 8 805762, 12" & CD, UK#23) Versions of the Rolling Stones' "Gimme Shelter" by Thunder, Little Angels and Hawkwind featuring Samantha Fox. 1 of 4 various artists EPs in benefit of the charity Shelter.

== Private pressings ==
There have been several CDs and DVDs that have been privately pressed by the band and made available for either members of the band's fan club, or for the audience at gigs.

- 1986 – Hawkfan 12 (vinyl LP, HWFB2) – includes "Countdown", "Ejection", "Ghost Dance"
- 1999 – Hawkwind 1997 (CD, HAWKVP999)
- 2002 – Second Annual Christmas Party (CD EP) – Bedouin: "Vision Quest"; Dave Brock: "Sonic Space Attack"; Tim Blake: "Untitled"; Huw Lloyd-Langton: "For Kirsty"; Hawkwind: "Technoland"
- 2004 – Spaced Out in London (CD, HAWKSR001CD)
- 2004 – Seasons Greetings from Deep Space (CD EP, HAWKSR002CD) – "Christmas Treat"; "Angela Android" [live]; "The Secret Knowledege of Water"; "Ritual Breathing"
- 2005 – Take Me to Your Leader: This Is Your Captain Speaking (promo CD, HAWKPROMO35CD) – Dave Brock interview; preview of tracks from Take Me to Your Leader
- 2008 – Space Melt (DVD)
- 2009 – 40th Anniversary (CD) – "Who's Gonna Win the War"; "Ode to a Crystal Set"; "Spirit of the Age"; "Starshine"; "Time and Confusion"; "Paradox"; "Something’s Going On"; "Lighthouse"; "Space Love"; "Diana Park"; "The Right to Decide"
