= Epocheclipse =

Box set by Hawkwind
- Released: August 1999
- Recorded: 1969–1999
- Genre: Space rock
- Label: EMI

Professional ratings
Review scores
| Source | Rating |
|---|---|
| The Encyclopedia of Popular Music | 30 Year Anthology |
| The Encyclopedia of Popular Music | The Ultimate Best of |

Epocheclipse is a 1999 compilation set by Hawkwind covering their entire career. It was released in two formats, a triple CD box set 30 Year Anthology and a single disc The Ultimate Best of.

The band's biggest hit single from 1972, "Silver Machine", was re-mixed by The KLF's Jimmy Cauty, with additional bass and guitars by Guy Pratt (Pink Floyd), under the name Infected By The Scourge of the Earth. The mixes were released as promos by EMI as a white-label 12" and CD (catalogue DECLIPSE1999), the 12" containing "12" Mix" and "New Mix", the CD containing "Radio Mix", "12" Mix" and the "Original version". The "12" Mix" and "Radio Mix" were included on 30 Year Anthology and The Ultimate Best of respectively.

== Track listing ==
=== 30 Year Anthology: CD1 ===
1. "Hurry on Sundown" (Dave Brock) [Hawkwind Zoo Demo] – 1970 – from Hawkwind (re-mastered)
2. "Paranoia (Part 2)" (Brock) – 1970 – from Hawkwind
3. "Master of the Universe" (Nik Turner, Brock) – 1971 – from In Search of Space
4. "Children of the Sun" (Turner, Dave Anderson) – 1971 – from In Search of Space
5. "Silver Machine" (Robert Calvert, Brock) [Original single version] – 1972 – single included on In Search of Space (re-mastered)
6. "Seven by Seven" (Brock) [Original single version] – 1972 – single B-side included on In Search of Space (re-mastered)
7. "Brainstorm" (Turner) – 1972 – from Doremi Fasol Latido
8. "Space is Deep" (Brock) – 1972 – from Doremi Fasol Latido
9. "Urban Guerilla" (Calvert, Brock) – 1973 – single included on Doremi Fasol Latido (re-mastered)
10. "Brainbox Pollution" (Brock) – 1973 – single B-side included on Doremi Fasol Latido (re-mastered)
11. "Sonic Attack" (Michael Moorcock)– 1972 – from Space Ritual
12. "Orgone Accumulator" (Calvert, Brock) – 1972 – from Space Ritual
13. "Lost Johnny" (Ian Kilmister) – 1974 – from Hall of the Mountain Grill
14. "The Psychedelic Warlords (Disappear in Smoke)" (Brock) [Single edit] – 1974 – single included on Hall of the Mountain Grill (re-mastered)

=== 30 Year Anthology: CD2 ===
1. "Motorhead" (Kilmister) – 1975 – single B-side included on Warrior on the Edge of Time (re-mastered)
2. "Assault and Battery" (Brock) – 1975 – from Warrior on the Edge of Time
3. "Golden Void" (Brock) – 1975 – from Warrior on the Edge of Time
4. "Magnu" (Brock) – 1975 – from Warrior on the Edge of Time
5. "Kerb Crawler" (Calvert, Brock) – 1976 – from Astounding Sounds, Amazing Music
6. "Steppenwolf" (Calvert, Brock) – 1976 – from Astounding Sounds, Amazing Music
7. "Back on the Streets" (Calvert, Paul Rudolph) – 1976 – single included on Astounding Sounds, Amazing Music (re-mastered)
8. "Quark, Strangeness and Charm" (Calvert, Brock) – 1977 – from Quark, Strangeness and Charm
9. "Hassan i Sabbah" (Calvert, Rudolph) – 1977 – from Quark, Strangeness and Charm
10. "Spirit of the Age" (Calvert, Brock) – 1977 – from Quark, Strangeness and Charm
11. "Psi Power" (Calvert, Brock) – 1978 – from 25 Years On
12. "25 Years" (Single mix) (Brock) – 1978 – from 25 Years On
13. "High Rise" (Calvert, Simon House) – 1978 – from PXR5
14. "Death Trap" (Calvert, Brock) – 1978 – from PXR5
15. "Uncle Sam's on Mars" (Calvert, Brock, House, Simon King) – 1978 – from PXR5

=== 30 Year Anthology: CD3 ===
1. "Shot Down in the Night" (Steve Swindells) [single version] – 1979 – from Live Seventy Nine
2. "Motorway City" (Brock) – 1980 – from Levitation
3. "Levitation" (Brock) – 1980 – from Levitation
4. "Angels of Death" (Brock) – 1981 – from Sonic Attack
5. "Coded Languages" (Moorcock, Harvey Bainbridge) – 1981 – from Sonic Attack
6. "Some People Never Die" (Brock) – 1982 – from Church of Hawkwind
7. "Choose Your Masks" (Moorcock, Brock) – 1982 – from Choose Your Masques
8. "Night of the Hawks" (Brock) – 1983 – from The Earth Ritual Preview EP
9. "Needle Gun" (Roger Neville-Neil, Brock) – 1985 – from The Chronicle of the Black Sword
10. "The War I Survived" (Neville-Neil, Brock, Alan Davey) – 1988 – from The Xenon Codex
11. "Black Elk Speaks" (Black Elk, John G. Neihardt, Brock)– 1990 – from Space Bandits
12. "Right To Decide" (Brock, Davey) – 1992 – from Electric Tepee
13. "Sputnik Stan" (Davey) – 1995 – from Alien 4
14. "Love in Space" (Brock) – 1996 - from Love in Space EP
15. "Silver Machine" (Calvert, Brock) [Infected by The Scourge of the Earth] – 1999

=== The Ultimate Best Of: single CD ===
1. "Silver Machine" (Calvert, Brock)
2. "Master of the Universe" (Turner, Brock)
3. "Urban Guerrilla" (Calvert, Brock)
4. "Sonic Attack" (Moorcock)
5. "The Psychedelic Warlords (Disappear in Smoke)" (Brock)
6. "Assault and Battery" (Brock)
7. "Motorhead" (Kilmister)
8. "Back on the Streets" (Calvert, Rudolph)
9. "Quark, Strangeness and Charm" (Calvert, Brock)
10. "25 Years" (Brock)
11. "Motorway City" (Brock)
12. "Angels of Death" (Brock)
13. "Night of the Hawks" (Brock)
14. "Needle Gun" (Neville-Neil, Brock)
15. "Right To Decide" (Brock, Davey)
16. "Alien I Am" (Brock) [Roswell edit] - 1995 - from Alien 4
17. "Love in Space" (Brock)
18. "Silver Machine" (Calvert, Brock) [Infected by The Scourge of the Earth - Radio edit] - 1999

== Charts ==
| Chart (1999) | Peak position |
|---|---|
| UK Rock & Metal Albums (OCC) | 29 |

== Release history ==
- August 1999: EMI, 521751–2, 3-CD box set
- August 1999: EMI, 521747–2, single CD
