= Spirit of the Age (album) =

Compilation album by Hawkwind
- Released: 1988
- Recorded: 1976–78
- Genre: Space rock
- Label: Virgin

Tales from Atom Henge: The Robert Calvert Years

Professional ratings
Review scores
| Source | Rating |
|---|---|
| The Encyclopedia of Popular Music | 3/5 stars |

Spirit of the Age is a 1988 compilation album by the British space rock group Hawkwind covering their Charisma Records period 1976–1979. It was issued by Virgin Records after they had acquired the Charisma catalogue, to test whether there was a viable market for the Hawkwind albums included in the deal. There was, and the company then re-issued each of the four albums the following year as part of the Compact price series.

In 1992, Virgin wished to include a new Hawkwind compilation, Tales from Atom Henge: The Robert Calvert Years, as part of their Virgin Universal series. The band's fan club editor, Brian Tawn, was approached to compile this new release, but chose to replicate the original compilation album with the exception of two changes: the addition of the previously hard to find single B-sides "Honky Dorky" and "The Dream of Isis", and the omission of "The Forge of Vulcan" in order to make space.

== Track listing ==
=== Spirit of the Age ===
1. "The Forge of Vulcan" (Simon House) – from Quark, Strangeness and Charm
2. "Flying Doctor" (Robert Calvert, Dave Brock) – from 25 Years On
3. "Steppenwolf" (Calvert, Brock) – from Astounding Sounds, Amazing Music
4. "Hassan I Sabbah" (Calvert, Paul Rudolph) – from Quark, Strangeness and Charm
5. "25 Years" (Brock) – from 25 Years On
6. "Jack of Shadows" (Calvert, Adrian Shaw, House) – from PXR5
7. "Psi Power" (Calvert, Brock) – from 25 Years On
8. "Reefer Madness" (Calvert, Brock) – from Astounding Sounds, Amazing Music
9. "Fable of a Failed Race" (Calvert, Brock) – from Quark, Strangeness and Charm
10. "High Rise" (Calvert, House) – from PXR5
11. "Quark, Strangeness and Charm" (Calvert, Brock) – from Quark, Strangeness and Charm
12. "Back on the Streets" (Calvert, Rudolph) – single A-side
13. "Kerb Crawler" (Calvert, Brock) – from Astounding Sounds, Amazing Music
14. "(Only) The Dreams of the Cold War Kid" (Calvert) – from 25 Years On
15. "Spirit of the Age" (Calvert, Brock) – from Quark, Strangeness and Charm

=== Tales from Atom Henge ===
1. "Honky Dorky" (Calvert, Brock, Rudolph, House, Simon King, Alan Powell) – single B-side
2. "Flying Doctor"
3. "Steppenwolf"
4. "Hassan I Sabbah"
5. "25 Years"
6. "Jack of Shadows"
7. "PSI Power"
8. "Reefer Madness"
9. "Fable of a Failed Race"
10. "High Rise"
11. "Quark, Strangeness and Charm"
12. "Back on the Streets"
13. "The Dream of Isis" (Brock, House, King) – single B-side
14. "Kerb Crawler"
15. "(Only) The Dreams of the Cold War Kid"
16. "Spirit of the Age"

== Release history ==
- Spirit of the Age: September 1988: Virgin Records, COMCD8
- Tales from Atom Henge: November 1992: Virgin Universal, CDVM9008
