= Jack of Shadows =

1971 science fantasy novel by Roger Zelazny

- Cover of first edition (hardcover)
- Author: Roger Zelazny
- Cover artist: Judith Loeser
- Language: English
- Genre: Science fantasy
- Publisher: Walker and Company
- Publication date: 1971
- Publication place: United States
- Media type: Print (Hardcover and Paperback)
- Pages: 207
- ISBN: 0-8027-5535-6
- OCLC: 160574
- Dewey Decimal: 813/.5/4
- LC Class: PZ4.Z456 Jac PS3576.E43

Jack of Shadows is a science fantasy novel by American author Roger Zelazny. It was serialized in The Magazine of Fantasy and Science Fiction in 1971 and published in book form that same year. The novel was nominated for a 1972 Hugo Award

== Plot ==
The novel is set in a world that is tidally locked. Thus, one side of the planet is always in light, and the other in darkness. Science rules on the dayside, while magic holds sway in the night.

Powerful magical entities live on the night side of the planet, and for the most part the entities' magical powers emanate from distinct loci. Jack of Shadows (also known as Shadowjack), the main character, is unique among the magical beings in that he draws his power not from a physical location but from shadow itself. He is nearly incapacitated in complete light or complete darkness, but given access to even a small area of shadow, his potency is unmatched.

Jack's only friend, the creature Morningstar, is punished by being trapped in stone at the edge of the night, to be released when dawn comes. His torso and head protrude from the rock, and he awaits the sun that will never rise.

Jack seeks "The Key That Was Lost", Kolwynia. The Key itself and the consequences of its use parallel Jack's progress in his own endeavors. Ultimately, the Key will be responsible for Jack's salvation and his doom.

Fleeing the dark side, Jack gets access to a computer and uses it to recover Kolwynia. This makes him unbeatable, but not all-powerful. Having made a mess of ruling with his new powers, he seeks the advice of Morningstar, who advises him to destroy The Machine at the Heart of the World, which maintains the world's stability, and set it rotating.

== Inspiration ==
Zelazny intended the name, but not the title character, as an homage to writer Jack Vance. In his introduction to the novel, Zelazny mentioned that he tried to capture some of the exotic landscapes that are frequent in Vance's work. Zelazny wrote the novel in first draft, with no rewrites.

== Variant text ==
The serialized version and the later book are slightly different. A copy-editing error garbled a conversation between Jack and Morningstar in chapter 6; the correct version appeared in the original magazine publication and has been reprinted on pages 511-512 of The Collected Stories of Roger Zelazny, Volume 3: This Mortal Mountain, NESFA Press, 2009.

== Reception ==
Lester del Rey received the novel unfavorably, noting that while the opening half was "minor Zelazny, quite enjoyable", the conclusion was "rather grim and ugly…[ultimately] dull". He concluded that, with the essentials of the hero's biography left unrevealed, "the whole thing seems rather pointless".

Reader response was largely favorable, as evidenced by the fact that the novel was nominated for two major speculative fiction awards—the Hugo Award and the Locus Award. The novel finished fourth in the 1972 Locus Poll for Best Novel.

== Related fiction ==
Zelazny was pressured by fans to write a sequel, but he declined, saying that “I didn’t really intend to continue that one. I liked ending it with that sort of ambiguous ending.” Instead, he wrote several prequels.

The Illustrated Roger Zelazny includes a prequel short story, "Shadowjack", illustrated by Gray Morrow. Zelazny's collection The Last Defender of Camelot (1981, Underwood-Miller) reprints the tale "Shadowjack", but without the illustrations. This was in the Underwood-Miller edition of the collection, but not the Pocket Books version. The story also appears in Last Exit to Babylon: Volume 4: The Collected Stories of Roger Zelazny, NESFA Press, 2009.

Wizards, edited by Bill Fawcett in 1983, contains the character biography titled "Shadowjack", written by Roger Zelazny and including details of the character's history that were not in the novel or the short story of the same name. It has also been reprinted in Last Exit to Babylon.

"Shadowland" was another prequel, written by Zelazny as the outline for an unproduced animated movie. The story takes place before the events of the novel and the short story, and it describes how the strange half-magic/half-science world of Jack of Shadows came into existence. The story was later developed and in production as a graphic novel before Zelazny died, but the project was abandoned. The story first appears in The Road to Amber: Volume 6: The Collected Stories of Roger Zelazny, NESFA Press, 2009.

== Allusions and references in other works ==
A song, "Jack of Shadows"—based on the novel and written by the Hawkwind band members Dave Brock, Robert Calvert, Simon King and Simon House—appears on the 1979 album PXR5.

In Daniel Keys Moran’s novel The Long Run, the protagonist Trent Castanaveras is rescued from a low Lunar orbit by a stealth spacecraft (from the Spacefarers Collective) called Jack of Shadows.

== Award nominations ==
- Hugo Award nominee, 1972
- Locus Award nominee, 1972
