= Angels of Death (Hawkwind album) =

Compilation album by Hawkwind
- Released: 1986
- Genre: Space rock
- Label: RCA

Hawkwind chronology
| Repeat Performance (1980) | Angels of Death (1986) | Spirit of the Age (1988) |

Professional ratings
Review scores
| Source | Rating |
|---|---|
| Allmusic | 3/5 stars |
| The Encyclopedia of Popular Music | 3/5 stars |

Angels of Death is a 1986 compilation album by Hawkwind covering their RCA/Active Records period 1981–1982. It draws from the albums Sonic Attack (1981), Church of Hawkwind (1982) and Choose Your Masques (1982).

== Track listing ==
=== Side one ===
1. "Angel Voices" (Harvey Bainbridge, Dr. Technical) – 1:30 – Church of Hawkwind
2. "Nuclear Drive" (Dave Brock) – 3:11 – Church of Hawkwind
3. "Rocky Paths" (Huw Lloyd-Langton) – 3:55 – Sonic Attack
4. "Solitary Mind Games" (Lloyd-Langton) – 4:08 – Choose Your Masques
5. "Living on a Knife Edge" (Brock) – 4:42 – Sonic Attack
6. "Fahrenheit 451" (Robert Calvert, Brock) – 4:34 – Choose Your Masques
7. "Looking in the Future" (Brock) – 4:03 – Church of Hawkwind

=== Side two ===
8. "Choose Your Masks" (Brock, Michael Moorcock) – 5:26 – Choose Your Masques
9. "The Joker at the Gate" (Bainbridge, Brock) – 1:55 – Church of Hawkwind
10. "Waiting for Tomorrow" (Lloyd-Langton) – 3:45 – Choose Your Masques
11. "The Last Messiah" (Bainbridge, Brock) – 1:35 – Church of Hawkwind
12. "Arrival in Utopia" (Brock, Moorcock) – 5:37 – Choose Your Masques
13. "Virgin of the World" (Bainbridge) – 4:09 – Sonic Attack
14. "Angels of Death" (Brock) – 5:51 – Sonic Attack

== Personnel ==
- Dave Brock – vocals (tracks 2,5-8,11,12,14), guitar, keyboards
- Huw Lloyd-Langton – vocals (3,4,10), guitars
- Harvey Bainbridge – vocals (9,13), bass, keyboards
- Martin Griffin – drums

== Release history ==
- November 1986: RCA, NL71150
