= Stasis =

Stasis (from Greek στάσις "a standing still") may refer to:

- A state in stability theory, in which all forces are equal and opposing, therefore they cancel out each other
- Stasis (political history), a period of civil war within an ancient Greek city-state
- Stasis (biology), a block of little or no evolutionary change in a species, in the punctuated equilibrium model of evolutionary biology
- Stasis (fiction), a concept in science fiction in which time or motion is stopped
- Stasis (film), a 2017 science-fiction film starring Anna Harr
- Stasis (liturgy), a division of a Kathisma or other liturgical verses
- Stasis, moniker of Steve Pickton, British techno musician
- Stasis (music), a technique or form used in minimalist music, and also any other style that may use slow musical development
- Stasis (rhetoric), a rhetoric technique
- Stasis (The UA Years 1971–1975), a compilation album by Hawkwind
- "Stasis" (The Outer Limits), an episode of the television show
- Stasis (video game), a science fiction point-and-click crowdfunded video game released in 2015
- Venous stasis in medicine may refer to venous insufficiency

== See also ==
- Hemostasis, a process to prevent and stop bleeding
- Homeostasis, a state of steady internal, physical, and chemical conditions maintained by living systems
- Stasi, the official state security service of the German Democratic Republic (East Germany)
