= Hawklords =

Hawklords is the name of two different bands with distinct histories, both consisting of former members of Hawkwind. The name may refer to:

- Hawklords (1970s band)
- Hawklords (2000s band)
