= The Business Trip =

Live album by Hawkwind
- Released: 19 September 1994
- Recorded: November 1993
- Venue: Thames Valley University
- Genre: Space rock
- Length: 73:05
- Label: Emergency Broadcast System
- Producer: Hawkwind

Hawkwind chronology
It Is the Business of the Future to Be Dangerous (1993)	The Business Trip (1994)	White Zone (1995)

Professional ratings
Review scores
Source	Rating
Allmusic	2/5 stars
The Encyclopedia of Popular Music	2/5 stars

The Business Trip is a 1994 live album by the English space rock group Hawkwind. It was recorded at the Slough gig of the group's 1993 tour to promote the It Is the Business of the Future to Be Dangerous album.

Although credited as being live, some of the tracks are studio recorded backing tapes, to which the band mimed, such as "Quark, Strangeness and Charm" and "Berlin Axis". "Terra Mystica". was a bonus on the original vinyl-only release, and has never been performed live. The version of "Quark, Strangeness and Charm" here has a new slower musical backing than the version that appeared on the group's 1977 album Quark, Strangeness and Charm, and this new version was released as an EP without the overdubbed crowd noise. "The Right Stuff" is a cover version from Robert Calvert's 1974 album Captain Lockheed and the Starfighters.

== Track listing ==
=== Side 1 ===
1. "Altair" [a.k.a. "Wave Upon Wave"] (Alan Davey) – 1:02
2. "Quark, Strangeness and Charm" (Robert Calvert, Dave Brock) – 6:24
3. "L.S.D." (Davey, Richard Chadwick) – 5:30
4. "The Camera That Could Lie" (Brock) – 6:55

=== Side 2 ===
5. "Green Finned Demon" (Calvert, Brock) – 6:32
6. "Do That" [a.k.a. "You Shouldn't Do That"] (Nik Turner, Brock) – 3:09
7. "The Day a Wall Came Down" (Brock) – 3:32
8. "Berlin Axis" (Brock) – 2:27
9. "Void of Golden Light" [a.k.a. "The Golden Void"] (Brock) – 5:50

=== Side 3 ===
10. "The Right Stuff" (Calvert) – 5:31
11. "Wastelands" [a.k.a. "Wastelands of Sleep"] (Brock) – 2:10
12. "The Dream Goes On" [a.k.a. "The Iron Dream"] (Simon King) – 1:56
13. "Right to Decide" (Brock) – 7:31

=== Side 4 ===
14. "The Dream Has Ended" [a.k.a. "You Know You're Only Dreaming"] (Brock) – 4:44
15. "This Future" [a.k.a. "Welcome to the Future"] (Calvert) – 1:52
16. "Terra Mystica" (Brock) – 8:00 – vinyl and Atomhenge CD bonus track

=== Note ===
Although banded as a separate track, "The Camera That Could Lie" forms the middle section of "L.S.D."

The notable tracks omitted from the album, recorded at the gig are:

Letting in the Past (Living in the Past), Tibet Is Not China, Psychedelic Warlords, Sputnik Stan, Assassins of Allah (Hassan-i-Sahba) / Space Is Their Palestine.

Davey's original vocals on Golden Void were overdubbed with Brock's.

A good quality video of the entire Slough gig is known to exist.

== Personnel ==
Hawkwind

- Dave Brock – guitar, keyboards, vocals
- Alan Davey – bass guitar, vocals
- Richard Chadwick – drums

== Credits ==
- Recorded live Thames Valley University, November 1993, engineered by Raymond Steeg.
- Photographs and fold-cover design of the original digipack release by John Chase.

== Charts ==
Chart (1994)	Peak position
UK Rock & Metal Albums (Official Charts)	30

== Release history ==
- September 1994: Emergency Broadcast System Records, UK; CD (EBSCD111), CD digipak (EBSSCD111) and 2x12" vinyl (EBSLP111)
- November 1994: Griffin Music, USA; CD (GCD 280-2), CD digipak (GCD 279-2) and 2x12" vinyl (GCD 280-1)
- 28 November 2011: Atomhenge (Cherry Red) Records, ATOMCD1031, UK CD
