= Carnivorous (album) =

Studio album by Hawkwind Light Orchestra
- Released: 16 October 2020
- Recorded: 2019 – early 2020
- Genres: Progressive rock; progressive pop
- Length: 71:03
- Language: English
- Label: Cherry Red

Hawkwind chronology
50 Live (2020)	Carnivorous (2020)	Somnia (2021)

Carnivorous is a 2020 album by British space rock band Hawkwind, released under the name Hawkwind Light Orchestra. The album contains songs inspired by the COVID-19 pandemic, and has received positive reviews from critics.

== Reception ==
Julian Marszalek of Classic Rock rated this album 3.5 out of 5 stars, summing up that "this is Hawkwind consolidating their strengths in the here and now". At Louder Than War, Paul Clarke called Carnivorous a "delight" or "fans of the veteran space rockers". In Prog, Joe Banks wrote that the first third of the album is the strongest, but the entire release has strong songs, with sounds similar to rave music and The Kinks. Record Collector's Rich Davenport rated this release 4 out of 5 stars, stating that "in the best Hawkwind tradition, the results are informed by current tribulations while offering absorbing musical escapism from same".

== Track listing ==
All songs written by Dave Brock, except where noted.

1. "Expedition to Planet X" – 1:25
2. "Dyna-Mite" – 3:42
3. "Void of Wasteland" – 5:16
4. "Repel Attract" – 3:12
5. "Attraction" (Brock, Magnus Martin) – 3:20
6. "Human Behaviour (No Sex Allowed)" – 5:40
7. "Temple of Love" – 1:49
8. "Square Peg in a Round Hole" – 4:44
9. "Windy Day" – 4:42
10. "Model Farm Blues" – 7:51
11. "Whose Call Is It Anyway?" (Brock, Martin) – 3:21
12. "Lockdown (Keep Calm)" (Brock, Martin) – 5:43
13. "The Virus" – 10:18
14. "Forgotten Memories" – 5:24
15. "Higher Ground" – 4:43

== Personnel ==
Hawkwind Light Orchestra

- Dave Brock – vocals, lead guitar, bass guitar, synthesizer, keyboards, drum programming, electronics
- Richard Chadwick – drums
- Magnus Martin – vocals, guitar

Additional personnel

- John Chase – photography
- Candy Floss – additional vocals
- Martin Krel – artwork
- Trixie Smith – additional vocals
- Kris Tait – additional vocals, coordination

== See also ==
- 2020 in British music
- List of 2020 albums
