= Kings of Speed =

Single by Hawkwind

from the album Warrior on the Edge of Time
- B-side: "Motorhead"
- Released: 7 March 1975
- Recorded: Olympic Studios, January 1975
- Genre: Space rock
- Length: 3:25
- Label: United Artists
- Songwriter(s): Michael Moorcock/Dave Brock
- Producer(s): Dave Brock

Hawkwind singles chronology
"Psychedelic Warlords" (1974)	"Kings of Speed" (1975)	"Kerb Crawler" (1976)

"Motorhead (outtake)"

Single by Hawkwind
- B-side: "Valium 10"
- Released: 21 August 1981
- Recorded: Olympic Studios, January 1975; Rockfield Studios, 1979
- Genre: Space rock
- Length: 3:05
- Label: Flicknife - FLSEP205
- Songwriter(s): Ian Kilmister
- Producer(s): Hawkwind

Hawkwind singles chronology
"Hawkwind Zoo EP" (1981)	"Motorhead (outtake)" (1981)	"Sonic Assassins" (1981)

"Kings of Speed" is a 1975 song by the British space rock group Hawkwind. It was originally released as a single in the UK (UP35808) on 7 March 1975 and was subsequently included on the album Warrior on the Edge of Time, although its B-side, "Motorhead", was not. Although failing the chart in both the U.S. and the U.K., the track became an underground success, particularly with significant play in dance clubs. The parent album also did well, climbing up the Billboard album chart in the U.S.

== Kings of Speed ==
The lyrics for this song were written by Michael Moorcock, "Frank and Beasley" refer to characters from Moorcock's Cornelius books. Simon King stated that it was originally intended for inclusion of the Deep Fix album New Worlds Fair.

"It's very powerful - it's got two drums on it and it sounds fucking great. It's like a Phil Spector thing." - Alan Powell, drummer

== Other versions ==
Neither song made it into the live set. It would be years until "King of Speed" would surface for a 1989 tour, while "Motorhead" has only recently been added to the band's current retro-show, with Alan Davey playing the part of Lemmy.

=== Outtake ===
The original backing tracks were taken by Brock from this Olympic Studio session, and he later added overdubs and released them through independent record companies. "Kings of Speed" was released as an instrumental (and claimed to be 'live') on the Hawkwind Zoo 12" EP (Flicknife Records, FLEP100, 1-May-1981). "Motorhead" was released as the A-side to a 7" and 12" single (Flicknife Records, FLS205, 2-July-1981), this time having a Brock vocal and synthesizer overdubs.
