= Lucky Leif and the Longships =

Studio album by Robert Calvert
- Released: September 1975
- Recorded: April 1975
- Studios: Island Studios, London
- Genre: Rock
- Length: 34:55
- Label: United Artists Records
- Producer: Brian Eno

Robert Calvert chronology
Captain Lockheed and the Starfighters (1974)	Lucky Leif and the Longships (1975)	Hype (1981)

Professional ratings
Review scores
Source	Rating
Allmusic	4/5 stars

Lucky Leif and the Long-ships is a 1975 record album by Robert Calvert, produced by Brian Eno.

It is a concept album dealing with how American culture might have been different had the Vikings managed to colonise the continent. The album is a tour through various styles of American music ("The Lay of the Surfers" is a Beach Boys parody), filled with references to modern American culture and ancient Norse myths and legends.

== Track listing ==
All songs written by Robert Calvert, and arranged by Robert Calvert and Paul Rudolph.

1. "Ship of Fools"
2. "The Lay of the Surfers"
3. "Voyaging to Vinland"
4. "The Making of Midgard"
5. "Brave New World"
6. "Magical Potion"
7. "Moonshine in the Mountains"
8. "Storm Chant of the Skraelings"
9. "Volstead O Vodeo Do"
10. "Phase Locked Loop"
11. "Ragna Rock"

=== 2007 Eclectic Discs and 2013 Atomhenge bonus tracks ===
12. "Howzat!"
13. "Cricket Lovely Reggae (Cricket Star)"

== Personnel ==
- Robert Calvert - vocals, trumpet, piano, harmonica
- Andy Roberts - organ, guitars, backing vocals
- Paul Fraser Rudolph - guitars, bass guitar, backing vocals
- Michael Moorcock - banjo
- Simon House - violin
- Nik Turner - saxophone
- Sal Maida - bass guitar
- Brian Turrington - bass guitar, piano
- Mike Nicholls - drums, percussion

Technical

- Brian Eno - producer, synthesizer, backing vocals
- Rhett Davies - engineer
- Guy Bidford, Robert Ash, Sid Bucknor - assistant engineers
- Tony Hyde - illustration

Audio CD Remasterer: Paschal Byrne
