= Masters of Rock (Hawkwind album) =

Compilation album by Hawkwind
- Released: May 2002
- Recorded: 1970 – 1975, 2001
- Genre: Rock
- Label: EMI

Masters of Rock, is a 2002 compilation album by Hawkwind covering the United Artists years 1970–75. There are two bonus live tracks from 2001.

== Track listing ==
1. "Master of the Universe"
2. "Brainstorm"
3. "Motorhead"
4. "Sonic Attack"
5. "Lord of Light" - Single version
6. "Hurry on Sundown"
7. "Orgone Accumulator"
8. "Lost Johnny"
9. "Silver Machine" - Original single version
10. "Urban Guerilla"
11. "Mirror of Illusion"
12. "Paradox"
13. "Love in Space" - Previously unreleased 2001 live version
14. "Light House" - Previously unreleased 2001 live version

== Release history ==
In May 2002: EMI, 5 37765 2
