= Alien 4 (album) =

Studio album by Hawkwind
- Released: 30 October 1995
- Recorded: 1995
- Studio: Rockfield Studios
- Genre: Space rock
- Length: 63:00
- Label: Emergency Broadcast System
- Producers: Hawkwind, Paul Cobbold

Hawkwind chronology
White Zone (1995)	Alien 4 (1995)	Love in Space (1996)

Professional ratings
Review scores
Source	Rating
Allmusic	4/5 stars

Alien 4 is the twentieth studio album by the English space rock group Hawkwind, released in 1995.

At the end of 1994, with the group established as a three piece of guitarist Dave Brock, bassist Alan Davey and drummer Richard Chadwick, they felt they were lacking visually in terms of showmanship. Ron Tree, who had been involved with groups in the English free-festival scene, had offered his services and the group accepted them. In addition, guitarist Jerry Richards, another musician involved in the English free-festival scene as a member of the group Tubilah Dog, started contributing to some live dates and recording sessions.

This new line-up undertook a 13 date North America tour in April 1995, then recorded a BBC Radio 1 session on 27 July, at Maida Vale Studios.

The album was recorded at Rockfield Studios in the summer, and the Area S4 EP featuring a "Roswell Mix" of "Alien (I Am)" was issued. "Death Trap" is a re-recording of the song from their 1978 album PXR5. "Wastelands" is a re-recording of "Wastelands Of Sleep" from their 1988 album The Xenon Codex. "Are You Losing Your Mind?" is a re-recording of "The Iron Dream" from their 1977 album Quark, Strangeness and Charm with new spoken words.

The cover is by Alan Arthurs, who was part of the band's crew and also worked on Brock's Devon farm, and was responsible for covers from Electric Tepee to Love in Space. He commented that it questions who the aliens are, whether the human race has now become alien to and destructive of nature.

The group undertook a 13 date UK tour in October, followed by 7 European dates, to promote the album. The Colston Hall, Bristol show on 19 October was filmed and recorded, and issued as the album Love in Space and video Love in Space. The group appeared on the VH1 programme Under the Bridge on 14 April 1996.

== Track listing ==
No.	Title	Writer(s)	Length
1.	"Abducted"	Ron Tree, Brock	2:45
2.	"Alien (I Am)"	Brock	7:46
3.	"Reject Your Human Touch"	Tree, Brock, Richard Chadwick, Alan Davey	2:20
4.	"Blue Skin"	Tree, Brock, Chadwick, Davey	7:07
5.	"Beam Me Up"	Hawkwind	4:11
6.	"Vega"	Davey	3:51
7.	"Xenomorph"	Tree, Davey	4:52
8.	"Journey"	Brock, Davey	3:12
9.	"Sputnik Stan"	Davey	7:03
10.	"Kapal"	Brock, Chadwick, Davey	5:11
11.	"Festivals"	Kris Tait, Brock	6:50
12.	"Death Trap"	Robert Calvert, Brock	3:57
13.	"Wastelands" (aka "Wastelands of Sleep")	Brock	1:22
14.	"Are You Losing Your Mind?"	Tree, Brock, Chadwick, Davey	2:33
15.	"Space Sex" (Vinyl and Atomhenge CD-only bonus track)	Brock	2:56

== Personnel ==
Hawkwind

- Ron Tree – vocals
- Dave Brock – electric guitar, keyboards, vocals
- Alan Davey – bass guitar, vocals
- Richard Chadwick – drums
- Jerry Richards – electric guitar (tracks 12–14)

== Credits ==
- Cover by Alan Arthurs

== Release history ==
- October 1995: Emergency Broadcast System Records, UK; 2x12" vinyl (EBSLP118), CD digipak (EBSSCD118), CD (EBSCD118)
- February 2010: Atomhenge (Cherry Red) Records, ATOMCD1018, UK 2CD
