= Love in Space =

Live album by Hawkwind
- Released: 20 May 1996
- Recorded: October 1995
- Genre: Space rock
- Label: Emergency Broadcast System
- Producer: Hawkwind, Paul Cobbold

Hawkwind chronology
| Alien 4 (1995) | Love in Space (1996) | Distant Horizons (1997) |

Professional ratings
Review scores
| Source | Rating |
|---|---|
| Allmusic | 2/5 stars |

Love in Space is a 1996 live album by the English space rock group Hawkwind. It was recorded during the group's 1995 tour to promote the Alien 4 album.

It was re-issued in 2009 with bonus tracks taken from the Love in Space EP.

The cover is the last by Alan Arthurs, who was part of the band's crew and also worked on Brock's Devon farm, and had been responsible for covers from Electric Tepee onward. On-stage photographs were by John Chase.

== Track listing ==
=== CD1 ===
1. "Abducted" (Ron Tree, Dave Brock) – 2:53
2. "Death Trap" (Robert Calvert, Brock) – 4:42
3. "Wastelands" (a.k.a. "Wastelands of Sleep") (Brock) – 1:35
4. "Are You Losing Your Mind?" (Tree, Brock, Alan Davey, Richard Chadwick) – 3:08
5. "Photo Encounter" (Brock) – 2:16
6. "Blue Skin" (Tree, Brock, Davey, Chadwick) – 6:56
7. "Sputnik Stan" (Davey) – 10:20
8. "Robot" (Calvert, Brock) – 7:38
9. "Alien (I Am)" (Brock) – 8:52

=== CD2 ===
1. "Xenomorph" (Tree, Davey) – 5:16
2. "Vega" (Davey) – 3:33
3. "Love in Space" (Brock) – 9:43
4. "Kapal" (Brock, Davey, Chadwick) – 6:05
5. "Elfin" (Davey) – 2:09
6. "Silver Machine" (Calvert, Brock) – 3:35
7. "Welcome to the Future" (Calvert) – 2:10
8. "Assassins" (a.k.a. "Hassan-i-Sabah" (Calvert, Paul Rudolph) / "Space Is Their (Palestine)" (Brock)) – 8:40

=== Atomhenge CD bonus tracks ===
9. "Love in Space" (Brock) [Studio Version] - 4:48
10. "Lord of Light" (Brock) [Live] - 3:52
11. "This is Hawkwind Sonic Attack" (Michael Moorcock, Brock) [re-mix] - 7:05

== Personnel ==
Hawkwind

- Ron Tree – vocals
- Dave Brock – electric guitar, keyboards, vocals
- Alan Davey – bass guitar, vocals
- Richard Chadwick – drums
- Liam Yeates, Michelle Gaskell – dancers
- Kris Tait, Wango Riley – fire eaters

== Credits ==
- Produced by Hawkwind and Paul Cobbold. Engineered by Paul Cobbold.
- Recorded on the Alien 4 tour, 1995.
- Cover by Alan Arthurs.

== Charts ==
| Chart (1996) | Peak position |
|---|---|
| UK Rock & Metal Albums (Official Charts) | 16 |

== Release history ==
- 1996: Emergency Broadcast System Records, EBS120, 2CD
- 29 June 2009: Atomhenge (Cherry Red) Records, ATOMCD2013, UK 2CD
