= Simon King (musician) =

English drummer (born 1950)

- Born: 12 August 1950 (age 76); Oxford, England
- Occupation: Drummer
- Formerly of: Opal Butterfly; Hawkwind

Simon King (born 12 August 1950) is an English drummer most noted for his work with Hawkwind. He was described in 1985 by British rock magazine Sounds as 'the definitive rock drummer.'

Born in Oxford, King commenced his career as a teenager in the late 1960s in the Oxfordshire-based psychedelic group Opal Butterfly who produced three singles as well as contributing to the soundtrack to the film Groupie Girl, in which King had a cameo role.

At their demise, Opal Butterfly's frontman had been Lemmy who went on to join Hawkwind. Hawkwind were having problems with their drummer Terry Ollis so King was invited by Lemmy to play alongside Ollis, but after a couple of gigs Ollis left and his place was permanently taken up by King. His first gig as sole drummer was the Greasy Truckers Party at the Roundhouse on 13 February 1972 which was recorded and released on two various artists compilation albums and as the hit single "Silver Machine", earning King an appearance on Top of the Pops.

From 1974 to 1976, King was joined on stage by drummer Alan Powell, who stepped in when King broke a rib playing football and 'stayed around'.

King remained with Hawkwind until the 1978, then joined the band's short-lived offshoot Hawklords. He plays on some of the tracks on that group's album 25 Years On, passing some of his drum duties onto Martin Griffin for personal reasons. He drummed on three tracks (25 Years, The Only Ones, and The Age of the Micro-Man, though takes of other album tracks with him are available on expanded album re-issues). During this time he teamed up with Huw Lloyd-Langton and Nic Potter to form a three piece named Jawa, and it is this band that recorded the Steve Swindells album Fresh Blood.

He briefly returned to Hawkwind for their Winter 1979 tour (see Live Seventy Nine), but quit again during the recording sessions for the Levitation album. He auditioned one final time for the 1982 Choose Your Masques tour, but being rejected he chose to leave the music business.

According to Hawkwind guitarist Dave Brock, in a 1984 taped interview for Tim Gadd's radio show Zooks, King left the band after 1979.

King has two children.

== Discography ==
- 1968 - Opal Butterfly - "Beautiful Beige" / "Speak Up" (single)
- 1968 - Opal Butterfly - "Mary Anne with the Shaky Hand" / "My Gration Or?" (single)
- 1969 - Opal Butterfly - "Groupie Girl" / "The Gigging Song" (single)
- 1972 - Various Artists - Glastonbury Fayre (live)
- 1972 - Various Artists - Greasy Truckers Party (live)
- 1972 - Hawkwind - "Silver Machine" / "Seven By Seven" (single)
- 1972 - Hawkwind - Doremi Fasol Latido
- 1973 - Hawkwind - Space Ritual (live)
- 1973 - Hawkwind - "Urban Guerrilla" / "Brainbox Pollution" (single)
- 1973 - Brian Eno - Here Come the Warm Jets
- 1974 - Hawkwind - "Psychedelic Warlords" / "It's So Easy" (single)
- 1974 - Hawkwind - Hall of the Mountain Grill
- 1974 - Robert Calvert - Captain Lockheed and the Starfighters
- 1975 - Hawkwind - "Kings of Speed" / "Motorhead" (single)
- 1975 - Hawkwind - Warrior on the Edge of Time
- 1975 - Michael Moorcock - New Worlds Fair
- 1976 - Hawkwind - Astounding Sounds, Amazing Music
- 1976 - Hawkwind - "Kerb Crawler" / "Honky Dorky" (single)
- 1977 - Hawkwind - "Back on the Streets" / "The Dream of Isis" (single)
- 1977 - Hawkwind - Quark, Strangeness and Charm
- 1977 - Hawkwind - "Quark, Strangeness and Charm" / "The Forge of Vulcan" (single)
- 1978 - Hawklords - 25 Years On
- 1978 - Hawklords - "Psi Power" / "Death Trap" (single)
- 1979 - Hawklords - "25 Years" / "(Only) The Dead Dreams of the Cold War Kid"; "PXR5" (single)
- 1979 - Hawkwind - PXR5
- 1979 - Robert Calvert - Lord of the Hornets/The Greenfly and the Rose (single)
- 1980 - Steve Swindells - Fresh Blood
- 1980 - Hawkwind - Live Seventy Nine (live)
- 1980 - Hawkwind - "Shot Down in the Night" / "Urban Guerilla" (single)
