= Stasis (The UA Years 1971–1975) =

Compilation album by Hawkwind
- Released: 1990

Alternative cover
- Vinyl LP cover

Stasis (The UA Years 1971–1975) is a 1990 compilation album by Hawkwind covering their United Artists period, from 1971 to 1975. It is mainly a collection of the previously hard to find single versions of songs, while the CD had the bonus of the first side of the Space Ritual album.

== Track listing ==
1. "Urban Guerilla"
2. "The Psychedelic Warlords" (Single version edit)
3. "Brainbox Pollution"
4. "Seven By Seven" (Remixed version)
5. "Paradox" (Remixed single edit)
6. "Silver Machine" (Original single mix)
7. "You'd Better Believe It" (Single version edit)
8. "Lord of Light"
9. "Black Corridor" (live)
10. "Space is Deep" (live)
11. "Earth Calling" (live) - bonus track on CD
12. "Born To Go" (live) - bonus track on CD
13. "Down Through the Night" (live) - bonus track on CD
14. "The Awakening" (live) - bonus track on CD
15. "You Shouldn't Do That" (live)

== Release history ==
- Apr 1990: EMI, NTS300, UK vinyl
- Apr 1990: EMI, CZ297, UK CD
- Apr 1992: EMI Fame, CDFA3267, UK CD
