= White Zone =

Studio album by Psychedelic Warriors
- Released: 20 June 1995
- Recorded: 1995
- Genre: Ambient techno
- Length: 45:10
- Label: Essential
- Producer: Hawkwind

Psychedelic Warriors chronology
The Business Trip (1994)	White Zone (1995)	Alien 4 (1995)

Professional ratings
Review scores
Source	Rating
Allmusic	2.5/5 stars

White Zone is the nineteenth studio album by Hawkwind, released under the band name Psychedelic Warriors in 1995. The name change reflects that this was a musical departure for the band; being an ambient techno album rather than rock, the album is completely instrumental (except for samples) and there is little guitar featured.

== Track listing ==
No.	Title	Writer(s)	Length
1.	"Am I Fooling"	Brock, Davey, Chadwick	1:28
2.	"Frenzzy"	Brock	5:48
3.	"Pipe Dreams" (From Strange Trips and Pipe Dreams)	Brock	3:38
4.	"Heart Attack"	Brock	0:54
5.	"Time And Space"	Brock, Davey	4:04
6.	"The White Zone" (From Strange Trips and Pipe Dreams)	Brock	7:32
7.	"In Search of Shangrila"	Brock	5:35
8.	"Bay of Bengal"	Brock	1:35
9.	"Moonbeam" (From Chalice of the Stars)	Chadwick	4:08
10.	"Window Pane"	Davey	5:08
11.	"Love in Space"	Davey	5:20

== Personnel ==
Psychedelic Warriors

- Dave Brock - guitar, keyboards
- Alan Davey - bass guitar, keyboards
- Richard Chadwick - drums
- Dave Charles - sampler, OSCI

== Release history ==
- Feb 1995: Emergency Broadcast, EBSSCD113, UK CD digipak
- May 1995: Griffin Music, GCD376-2, USA CD
- May 2010: Atomhenge (Cherry Red) Records, ATOMCD1023, UK CD
