= Shot Down in the Night =

Single by Hawkwind

from the album Live Seventy Nine
- B-side: "Urban Guerilla"
- Released: 27 June 1980
- Recorded: November 1979
- Genre: Space rock
- Length: 4:15
- Label: Bronze Records - BRO98
- Songwriter: Steve Swindells
- Producers: Ashley Howe and Hawkwind

Hawkwind singles chronology
"'25 Years'" (1979)	"Shot Down in the Night" (1980)	"'Who's Gonna Win The War?'" (1980)

"Shot Down in the Night"

Single by Steve Swindells

from the album Fresh Blood
- B-side: "It's Only One Night of Your Life"
- Released: 27 June 1980
- Recorded: 1979
- Genre: Rock music
- Length: 5:12
- Label: ATCO – K11532
- Songwriter: Steve Swindells
- Producer: Steve Swindells

Steve Swindells singles chronology
"'Energy Crisis'" (1974)	"Shot Down in the Night" (1980)	"'Turn It On, Turn It Off'" (1981)

Shot Down in the Night is a 1979 song written by Steve Swindells, who was at that time keyboardist with the UK rock group Hawkwind. Swindells and Hawkwind released different versions of the song as a single on 27 June 1980. Hawkwind's version reached #59 in the UK singles chart, being a slightly different version to the one on the album Live Seventy Nine.

The song was written by Steve Swindells while rehearsing with Hawkwind (then working under the name "Hawklords") at Rockfield Studios in 1979. He presented it to the band, and they agreed on its potential as a future single. However, Swindells was then offered a solo record deal by ATCO, and left Hawkwind to pursue a solo career. His studio version of Shot Down in the Night was released as a single on the same day as Hawkwind's live version.

Swindells claims that his version was "waaay harder, more dramatic and simply better than Hawkwind’s version. In both the battle of the butch and the artistic, the queer won." Despite that claim, Simon King (drums) and Huw Lloyd-Langton (guitars) played on both recordings, giving the two versions a musical closeness, although Swindells' gruff vocals perhaps make his version heavier than Dave Brock's folky vocal on Hawkwind's version.
