= Spirit of the Age (song) =

Single by Hawkwind

from the album Take Me to Your Leader
- B-side: "Angela Android; Assassins of Allah; Paradox 2005"
- Released: August 2004
- Recorded: 2004
- Genre: Space rock
- Label: Voiceprint Records - HAWKVP55CD
- Songwriter: Robert Calvert/Dave Brock
- Producer: Hawkwind

Hawkwind singles chronology
"'Love in Space'" (1997)	"Spirit of the Age" (2004)

Spirit of the Age is a 1977 song by the UK rock group Hawkwind. It was originally recorded and issued on the album Quark, Strangeness and Charm.

The lyrics of the song are composed of two of Robert Calvert's science fiction poems, the first verse being "The Starfarer's Despatch", which he had recited at shows whilst being the "resident poet" in the band in 1971, and the second being "The Clone's Poem". Both of these poems were published amongst a collection of his poetry issued as Centigrade 232, published by Quasar in 1978. Throughout the song is a rhythmic electronic pulse. This repeated sound is the Morse Code for SOS (dot-dot-dot, dash-dash-dash, dot-dot-dot).

The song was a popular addition to the band's live set and even remained after Calvert's departure from the band in 1979. A more aggressive version of the song with vocals by Brock was issued on the Live Seventy Nine album in 1980.

On 14 November 2019, the group recorded a session for Marc Riley's BBC Radio 6 Music show, playing "65 Million Years Ago", "Last Man on Earth", "Spirit of the Age" and "Silver Machine".

== Critical reception ==
AllMusic recognized the song as a vital touchstone for the band and an immortal live favorite.

== 1993 Mixes ==
The song was subject to various remixes and issued as the Spirit of the Age - Solstice Mixes EP in June 1993 on 4-Real Records (4R1). Mixes were by Astralasia (Marc Swordfish, Nosmo) and produced by Salt Tank (David Gates & Malcolm Stanners).

=== 12" ===
1. "Spirit of the Age" Full Vocal Mix (Calvert/Brock) – 9:56
2. "Spirit of the Age" Hard Trance Mix (Calvert/Brock) – 8:43
3. "Spirit of the Age" Cyber Trance Mix (Calvert/Brock) – 9:52
4. "Spirit of the Age" Flesh To Phantasy Mix (Calvert/Brock) – 12:06

=== CD ===
1. "Spirit of the Age" Radio Edit (Calvert/Brock)
2. "Spirit of the Age" Full Vocal Mix (Calvert/Brock)
3. "Spirit of the Age" Cyber Trance Mix (Calvert/Brock)
4. "Spirit of the Age" Flesh to Phantasy Ambient Remix (Calvert/Brock)

Note: The band performed a very rare second encore at the 1993 Brixton Academy gig, where they mimed along to "The Full Vocal Mix", with both members of Salt Tank on stage.

== 2004 single ==
In 2004 the band recorded a new studio version of the song which was issued as a single in two different formats. The first verse featured a vocal by tabloid journalist Matthew Wright who, while interviewing the band on a London radio show, had revealed that he was a big fan of the band. This version was included on their Take Me to Your Leader album.

=== CD1 ===
1. "Spirit of the Age" (Calvert/Brock) – Radio Edit
2. "Angela Android" (Chadwick) – Live Version
3. "Assassins of Allah" [aka "Hassan-i Sabbah"/"Space is Their (Palestine)"] (Calvert/Rudolph/Brock) – Live Version

=== CD2 ===
1. "Spirit of the Age" (Calvert/Brock) – Live Version
2. "Paradox" (Brock) – New studio version

== Cover versions ==
Banco de Gaia released a cover of the song on his 2009 album Memories Dreams Reflections, with the lyrics spoken by newsreader and continuity announcer Neil Sleat.
