= Adrian Shaw (musician) =

British musician

Adrian Shaw (born 2 January 1947 in Hampstead, North London), frequently known as Ade Shaw, is a musician primarily working in the psychedelic field. He has a long history dating back to the 1960s and has worked with such acts as: J P Sunshine, Magic Muscle, High Tide, Keith Christmas, Hawkwind, Robert Calvert, Country Joe McDonald, Arthur Brown,The Deviants, Hawklords, and The Bevis Frond. Shaw also played bass on recordings for former Tyrannosaurus Rex percussionist Steve Peregrin Took's band in 1974 and three years later, while appearing with Hawkwind on the former other half of Tyrannosaurus Rex Marc Bolan's TV show, was himself invited to join T.Rex; however Bolan's death very shortly thereafter prevented this. Shaw has played bass on Hawkwind's Quark,Strangeness & Charm and PXR5 albums, and on various Hawkwind-related compilation albums. As a long term member of The Bevis Frond, Shaw played on more than 20 of their albums and releases. He has also released eight solo albums.
