= Urban Guerrilla =

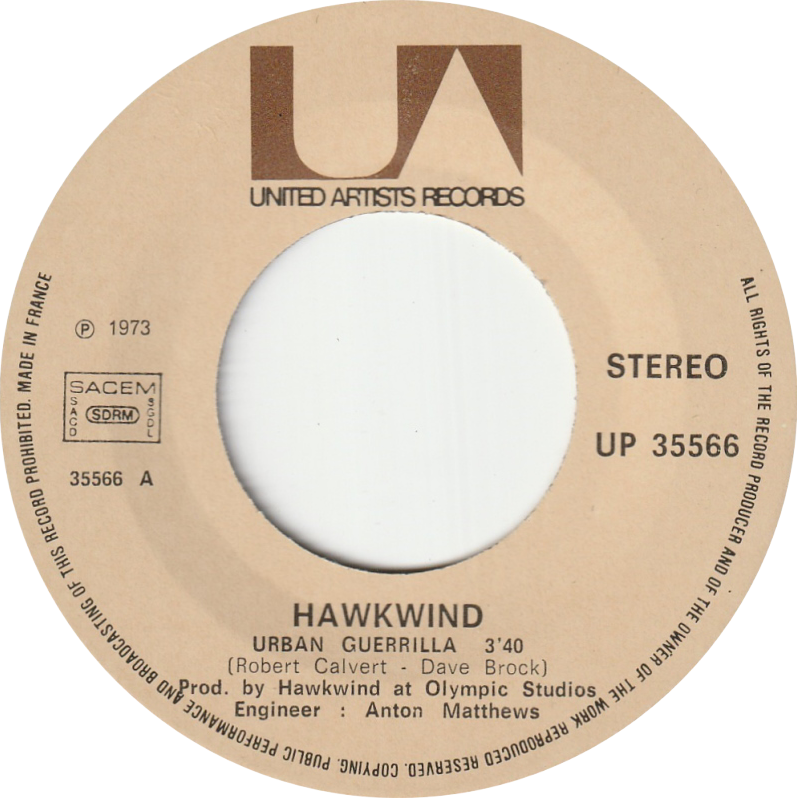

Single by Hawkwind
- B-side: "Brainbox Pollution"
- Released: 27 July 1973
- Recorded: Olympic Studios, 1973
- Genre: Space rock
- Length: 3:40
- Label: United Artists Records
- Songwriter: R. Calvert/D. Brock
- Producer: Hawkwind

Hawkwind singles chronology
"Silver Machine" (1972)	"Urban Guerrilla" (1973)	"Psychedelic Warlords" (1974)

"Urban Guerrilla" is a 1973 song by the UK rock group Hawkwind. It was originally released as a single in the UK (UP 35566) on 27 July 1973 with "Brainbox Pollution" as the B side, reaching #39 on the UK singles chart before being withdrawn after 3 weeks. It is also on the remastered version of Doremi Fasol Latido.

== Lyrics and controversy ==
Robert Calvert wrote and sang the lyrics, this being Hawkwind's only studio recording with a Calvert vocal prior to his rejoining the band as a permanent frontman and vocalist in 1976.

At the time of the single's release, the IRA had instigated a bombing campaign in London and the BBC refused to play the single. After deliberation and the brief notion of promoting the b-side instead ("Brainbox Pollution", which dealt with the effects of drug misuse), the band's management opted to withdraw the single stating that "Although the record was selling very well, we didn't want to feel that any sales might be gained by association with recent events - even though the song was written by Bob Calvert two years ago as a satirical comment, and was recorded three months ago." Dave Brock has subsequently stated that "It was stupid to withdraw it, they were paranoid they'd get bombed. I thought that record was what everything was about in the 1970s."

Calvert originally claimed the lyrics were a satire, but later claimed that "it didn't surprise me that it was banned by the BBC at all, in fact, I expected it to cause a lot of controversy". Lemmy explains that "We once did a benefit gig for the Stoke Newington 8. They were anarchists of some sort (The Angry Brigade) - making bombs in your basement and all that. Urban Guerrilla was about that. That's what Calvert was like."

It had been reported at the time that Nik Turner's flat in Gloucester Road had been raided and searched by the bomb squad, but a 1998 interview with Turner suggests that this activity was more to do with visiting Hells Angels wanted in connection with manslaughter.

== Music ==
As far as the music is concerned, many of the band weren't happy with it anyway. Del Dettmar commented "The mix is too toppy. I'd like to re-do the ending. Ah well, it's not a very good song anyway. And it isn't very well played.", whilst Simon King stated "I didn't like the idea of doing a single, and I didn't like the song to be quite honest." Lemmy liked the song: "We didn't make commercial records - the best thing we made was 'Urban Guerrilla', but that got pulled off the racks because it was when the IRA bombed Harrods. Went down like a concrete parachute, that."

== Other versions ==
The band undertook an extensive UK tour in June and July 1973 to promote the single, a poorly recorded version from this time appearing on Bring Me the Head of Yuri Gagarin, but soon after Calvert stopped working with the band in an official capacity (largely due to the instability caused by his bi-polar disorder) and the song was dropped. It was restored to the live set in 1977 during Calvert's second spell with the band and remained even after his departure in 1978, the vocals being handled by Brock and a live version appearing on the b-side to the "Shot Down in the Night" single. It was finally dropped in 1984.

- Mudhoney, one of Seattle's pioneers of Grunge have often voiced their appreciation of Hawkwind and recorded a version of the song for a John Peel session in 2002.
- Cobra Verde covered the song for their covers album.
- Primal Scream covered the song released as a single in 2008, adding the line "I'm a suicide bomber".
