= Quark, Strangeness and Charm =

Studio album by Hawkwind
- Released: 17 June 1977
- Recorded: February 1977
- Studio: Rockfield Studios
- Genres: Space rock; experimental rock; pop
- Length: 36:54 (original)
- Labels: Charisma (Europe), Sire (North America)
- Producer: Hawkwind

Hawkwind chronology
Astounding Sounds, Amazing Music (1976)	Quark, Strangeness and Charm (1977)	25 Years On (1978)

Singles from Quark, Strangeness and Charm
- 1. "Quark, Strangeness and Charm" Released: 29 July 1977

Quark, Strangeness and Charm is the seventh studio album by the English space rock group Hawkwind, released in 1977. It spent six weeks on the UK Albums Chart peaking at number 30.

This is Hawkwind's seventh studio album, hence "The Hawkwind Part 7" title on the inner sleeve. It is the band's first album without co-founding member Nik Turner, and drummer Alan Powell had also departed. In addition, Adrian "Ade" Shaw from Magic Muscle replaced Paul Rudolph during the recording session. The music on this album is more pop-oriented than their previous offerings.

The cover is Hawkwind's only design by Hipgnosis, featuring photographs taken inside Battersea Power Station processed by Richard Manning with graphics by Geoff Halpin.

A new remix and surround mix of the album by Steven Wilson was released in 2023 by Atomhenge records as part of the Days of the Underground boxed set.

== Recording ==
At the end of 1976, after their Astounding Sounds, Amazing Music album and tour, Hawkwind were reduced to a five-piece following the departure of saxophonist Nik Turner and drummer Alan Powell. They recorded the single "Back on the Streets" and undertook an eight-date tour of England in December which featured embryonic versions of the Quark, Strangeness and Charm tracks "Spirit of the Age", "Hassan I Sahba" and "Damnation Alley".

The group entered Rockfield Studios to record this album in January and February 1977, self-producing the album with help from resident engineer Dave Charles. However, Paul Rudolph left during the recording sessions having been given an ultimatum to "apologis[e] for something or leaving. I chose the latter, not fully understanding the situation". Guitarist Dave Brock expanded on his leaving with the explanation "You get an idea and you like things to be a sort of unit and we were in the studio and he was in a chair playing his bass and we were doing a high energy number!", while singer Robert Calvert added that "Rudolph was always carping about not doing [numbers influenced by science fiction] and it affects you." The 2009 2CD re-issue of the album includes early versions of tracks with Rudolph's contributions.

Rudolph's replacement was Adrian "Ade" Shaw, bass player from the group Magic Muscle, who had shared Hawkwind's management and been the support act on the 1972 Space Ritual tour. Shaw's introduction to the group was after the backing tracks had been completed, so he was required to overdub his bass parts onto the existing tracks. Drummer Simon King lamented "I only wish that I'd recorded the rhythm tracks with him in the first place. For me the switch of bass players happened at just the right moment. With going back to using one drummer I needed help from a bass player and as things were I wasn't getting it."

Paul Rudolph plays some instrumental parts on the track "Hassan I Sahba", though he is not credited. On the later extended release his bass playing can be heard on the early outtakes of several songs, including an alternative version of the song "Damnation Alley".

== Tours and promotion ==
After recording the album, the group undertook an 11 date tour of Germany and the Netherlands in March, followed by a five date tour of France in April. In June, during which the album received its general release, the group undertook a 10 date tour of England with support from former bassist Lemmy's group Motörhead. (Note: A recording of Motörhead's performance on 3 June at Birmingham Town Hall was issued in 1989 as Blitzkrieg on Birmingham '77 (Receiver Records, RRLP 120).) They followed this with appearances at the Stonehenge Free Festival on 21 June and headlined the Reading Festival on 28 August.

The group appeared on Marc Bolan's show Marc at Granada Television's Manchester studios on 14 September, miming to a pre-recorded version of the single "Quark, Strangeness and Charm", even though it had been released two months previously. Their spot on the show was secured as their management team, Tony Howard and Jeff Dexter, also handled Bolan. Their appearance was significant in that Brock did not appear, due to a long-standing resentment on his part towards Bolan. His role was filled by Shaw recording the guitar tracks at the pre-record, while Calvert mimed guitar during filming.

An extensive 20 date UK tour in September and October was undertaken, with support from Bethnal (who would go on to be Calvert's backing group for his 1981 album Hype). This was immediately followed by an October tour of France, but due to Calvert's erratic behaviour, the tour was aborted after 3 dates. At Calvert's wedding to author Pamela Townley on 5 November, he countered that "Brock convinced the others that I was having a nervous breakdown. What nonsense! They dumped me and my bags on the street in Paris... I was a bit high-spirited – after all, I was going to get married! The truth is that Dave Brock didn't want to do the extra gigs." However, in a BBC4 documentary on the band, several of the band members stated that the reason was indeed Calvert's mental health and that he chased after the band's car waving a sword and climbing over cars to reach them.

In January and February 1978, the group recorded the album PXR5 and in March toured North America, after which they disbanded. Calvert and Brock would then go on to form the Hawklords.

There are several live recordings in existence from these tours that have been issued under different titles. The dates given for the live PXR5 tracks do not match the tour dates and if these tracks actually were recorded at a live show, then they were subsequently subject to studio overdubs. All the other tracks, although differing sources are given, are the same recordings, with the exception of "Robot" which is of two different performances.

- PXR5: "Uncle Sam's on Mars" – Hammersmith Odeon, November; "Robot" and "High Rise" – Leicester De Montfort Hall, November.
- Weird tape 2: "Quark, Strangeness And Charm", "Master of the Universe", "Welcome to the Future", "Spirit of the Age", "Sonic Attack" – Stonehenge Free Festival and Oxford.
- Weird tape 3: "High Rise", "Damnation Alley", "Uncle Sam's on Mars", "Iron Dream", "Robot" [version 1] – Stonehenge Free Festival.
- Weird tape 5: "Brainstorm", "Wind of Change", "Assassins of Allah", "Forge of Vulcan" – Hammersmith Odeon. "Steppenwolf" – Leicester DeMontford Hall.
- Hawkwind, Friends and Relations Volume 1: "Robot" [version 2] – no source stated.
- Hawkwind, Friends and Relations Volume 2: "Spirit of the Age" – Chicago, March 1978.
- Hawkwind Anthology: "High Rise", "Quark, Strangeness and Charm" – USA, March 1978
- PXR5 2009 re-issue: "Quark, Strangeness and Charm" – USA, March 1978.
- Quark, Strangeness and Charm 2CD 2009 re-issue: "Spirit of the Age"; "Robot" [version 2 edit]; "High Rise".

On 31 March 2023, Atomhenge Records (via Cherry Red) issued a new Steven Wilson mix and surround mix of the album as part of Days of the Underground (The Studio & Live Recordings 1977-1979) 8CD/2BR boxed set. This set also collated most of the previously issued live recordings of the time (Croydon Fairfield Halls 25 September, Ipswich The Gaumont 27 September and Leicester De Montfort Hall 29 September) with additional previously unissued performances. An abbreviated vinyl release of the live shows followed for the year's Record Store Day as The Iron Dream in a quantity of 2500.

== Songs ==
See also articles "Spirit of the Age" and "Quark, Strangeness and Charm (single)".

The lyrics for "Damnation Alley" were inspired by Roger Zelazny's book Damnation Alley. It was first performed on their December 1976 UK tour and remained in the set until the formation of the Hawklords in 1978. It was re-introduced to the live set between 1989 and 1992 and a version appeared on the 1991 album Palace Springs.

"Hassan-i Sabbah" (spelt Hassan I Sahba on the cover) is a Middle Eastern flavoured song, mixing the legend of Hassan-i Sabbah (assassins and hashish) with contemporary issues (oil and Palestinian terrorism). It is a Paul Rudolph/Robert Calvert collaboration. This version was released as a 7" single in Italy and France. During the live performance of this song, Calvert took on the persona of Aubrey Dawney, which he describes as "a sort of 1914–1918 fighter ace, plus a bit more. Mick Farren described him as being a cross between Biggles and Lawrence of Arabia – which he is, he has connections with the Far East and also opium smoking". It was first performed live during 1976's Astounding Sounds, Amazing Music album tour, a version appearing on Atomhenge 76, and remained in the set until the formation of the Hawklords in 1978. A new studio version was recorded for the 1987 album Out & Intake and since then it has almost been an ever-present element in the live set, appearing on numerous live albums, usually under the title "Assassins of Allah".

"The Forge of Vulcan" is a Simon House-written instrumental, featuring organ, synthesiser and sequencer with percussion provided by hammering on an anvil in reference to the mythology of Vulcan. It was played live during the tour of the album, a version appearing on Weird tape 5, but then dropped.

"Days of the Underground" is a self-reflective song covering the halcyon days of the band.

"Iron Dream" is an instrumental based on Gustav Holst's "Mars", its name taken from Norman Spinrad's book The Iron Dream. The track was typically played live as a climax to "Uncle Sam's on Mars", versions of which can be heard on The Weird Tapes. It has also appeared under the title "The Dream Goes On" on 1994's The Business Trip album and with added lyrics as "Are You Losing Your Mind?" on 1995's Alien 4 album.

== Critical reception ==
Professional ratings
Review scores
Source	Rating
AllMusic	4.5/5 stars
Christgau's Record Guide	B+
The Encyclopedia of Popular Music	2/5 stars

The album was warmly received by the British weekly music papers at the time of its release, Sounds noting that "the band are still capable of making a stir", and Melody Maker that they had "gone part of the way [in rehabilitating themselves]".

Critics especially praised Calvert, with Sounds stating that "Calvert, having adapted to his role as frontman, now pulls out the stops, his poetical-lyrical contributions working particularly well", Melody Maker observing that "the band have developed a real sense of humour" and the album "finds Calvert in very fine form as a lyricist", while the NME assessed it as "sci-fi comic book thrills to the proles, only this time around Bob Calvert's psychotic sense of humour is well to the fore".

The critics were less complimentary about the progress in the band's music, with Melody Maker noting that the lyrical improvement "has not been matched instrumentally nor structurally. The only musician of note... is Simon House for his consistently impressive violin passages", while the NME stated that "musically it's all battering ram riffs and monoplane synthesised drones, with Dave Brock occasionally cutting loose on guitar (rather than just providing frenetic rhythm) and Simon House contributing some hypnotic violin solos". Sounds felt the "production may be naff in parts", believing the "magnificent mugginess" of Doremi Fasol Latido more suited to the band's sound.

== Track listing ==
=== Side 1 ===
1. "Spirit of the Age" (Robert Calvert, Dave Brock) – 7:20
2. "Damnation Alley" (Calvert, Brock, Simon House) – 9:06
3. "Fable of a Failed Race" (Calvert, Brock) – 3:15

=== Side 2 ===
4. "Quark, Strangeness and Charm" (Calvert, Brock) – 3:41
5. "Hassan I Sahba" (Calvert, Paul Rudolph) – 5:21
6. "The Forge of Vulcan" (House) – 3:05
7. "Days of the Underground" (Calvert, Brock) – 3:13
8. "The Iron Dream" (Simon King) – 1:53

=== Atomhenge bonus tracks ===
9. "Damnation Alley" [live studio version] – 10:33
10. "A minor Jam Session" – 9:49
11. "Spirit of the Age" [demo – excerpt] – 2:59
12. "Hash Cake Cut" – 4:25

=== Atomhenge bonus CD ===
1. "Damnation Alley" [first studio version] – 10:34
2. "Spirit of the Age" [full extended version] – 11:20
3. "Days of the Underground" [first version] – 5:38
4. "Quark, Strangeness and Charm"/"Uncle Sam's on Mars" – 9:18
5. "Fable of a Failed Race" [extended version] – 6:49
6. "Damnation Alley" [alternate harmony vocal version] – 8:23
7. "Spirit of the Age" [live 1977] – 5:54
8. "Robot" [live 1977] – 5:57
9. "High Rise" [live 1977] – 5:39

== Personnel ==
Hawkwind

- Dave Brock – guitar, synthesisers, sound effects, vocals
- Robert Calvert – vocals, spoken word, percussion, morse
- Simon House – keyboards, violin, anvil, vocals
- Adrian Shaw – bass guitar, vocals
- Simon King – drums, percussion

== Charts ==
Chart (1977)	Peak position
UK Albums (Official Charts)	30

== Release history ==
- June 1977: Charisma, CDS4008, UK vinyl – original release contained an inner sleeve with typed lyrics on graphic paper.
- June 1977: Sire, SRK6047, USA vinyl – original release contained an inner sleeve with typed lyrics on graphic paper.
- June 1977: Charisma, 9124012, Germany/Italy – contained 6 slides of Calvert/Brock/Rudolph/House/King performing Atomhenge
- June 1977: Charisma, 9211–4008, Canada
- October 1986: Charisma, CHC50, UK vinyl
- April 1989: Virgin, CDSCD4008, UK CD
- June 1995: Griffin Music, GCD370-0, USA CD; GCDHA162-2, USA CD with the Michael Butterworth Queens of Deleria book.
- March 2009: Atomhenge (Cherry Red) Records, ATOMCD2009, UK 2CD
- August 2020: Atomhenge, ATOMLP2002, UK 2LP. Record Store Day edition, cut at Abbey Road Studios and pressed on clear vinyl with a bonus LP featuring five alternate studio session takes.
- 31 March 2023: Atomhenge (Cherry Red) Records, ATOMCD101050, UK 8CD/2BR
