= PXR5 =

Studio album by Hawkwind
- Released: 15 June 1979
- Recorded: De Montfort Hall, Leicester, 29 September 1977 (tracks 6, 7); Hammersmith Odeon, London, 5 October 1977 (track 3); Rockfield Studios, January 1978 (tracks 1, 2, 8); Week Park Farm, Devon, June 1978 (tracks 4, 5)
- Genre: New wave
- Length: 37:33
- Label: Charisma
- Producers: Calvert/Brock (track 1), Calvert/House (track 2), Hawkwind (tracks 3, 6, 7), Dave Brock (tracks 4, 5, 8)

Hawkwind chronology
25 Years On (1978)	PXR5 (1979)	Live Seventy Nine (1980)

Professional ratings
Review scores
Source	Rating
Allmusic	3/5 stars
The Encyclopedia of Popular Music	3/5 stars

PXR5 is the ninth studio album by the English space rock group Hawkwind, released in 1979. It reached No. 59 on the UK album charts.

A new remix and surround mix of the album by Steven Wilson was released in 2023 by Atomhenge Records as part of the Days Of The Underground boxed set.

== Overview ==
Allmusic referred to PXR5 as "the last in the sequence of brittle, pop-inflected records the band launched with Astounding Sounds, Amazing Music", saying that Hawkwind "both understood and allowed themselves to absorb the energies of new wave" on PXR5.

The album was recorded and mixed at Rockfield Studios in January and February 1978. "Uncle Sam's on Mars", "Robot" and "High Rise" were originally recorded on the preceding UK tour but were partly overdubbed in the studio, particularly Robert Calvert's double-tracked vocals. "Infinity" and "Life Form" were originally to have been part of a solo album Dave Brock was working on.

After the album was recorded and mixed, the band split up during a US tour in March when Simon House left to join David Bowie's band and Robert Calvert suffered a bout of clinical depression. With the band in temporary hiatus and no pending promotional tour, the album's release was shelved.

The band re-emerged in mid-1978 as the Hawklords to record the 25 Years On album. Two tracks were released as singles, "Psi Power" and "25 Years", which featured "Death Trap" and "PXR5" respectively on their B-sides. The PXR5 album was eventually released on 15 June 1979, and the cryptic message on the cover "This is the last but one" refers to the fact that it was recorded prior to 25 Years On.

The album's cover featured a British BS 1363 mains plug wired in a dangerous way. Shortly after the album's release, the illustration of the plug was covered by a sticker obscuring the image.

=== Lyrical references ===
- The lyrics of "Jack of Shadows" are inspired by Roger Zelazny's book Jack of Shadows.
- "Uncle Sam's on Mars" evolved from the Neu!-esque "Opa Loka", with a Calvert-penned anti-US rant over the top of it. Its first performance was at the Cardiff Castle Festival in summer 1976 as "Vikings on Mars", read by Calvert from his clipboard notes, and with the aid of a megaphone, on stage after "Opa Loka". "Robot" also made a brief appearance as a poem at this historic gig. The song title itself is a twist on Gil Scott-Heron's "Whitey on the Moon".
- "Infinity" uses a Calvert poem from Space Ritual.
- "Robot" references Isaac Asimov's Three Laws of Robotics.
- The lyrics of "High Rise" are inspired by J.G. Ballard's book High-Rise and short story "The Man on the 99th Floor".
- The lyrics of "PXR5" deal with Hawkwind's transitional period between Astounding Sounds, Amazing Music and Quark, Strangeness and Charm.

=== CD Versions ===
The Virgin CD issue was mastered with tapes different from those used for the original vinyl version. The most notable difference is that "High Rise" is the live version without studio overdubs, so starts with a clunk rather than the portamento bass intro and has a coarser vocal from Calvert. Also "PXR5" gains an introduction that's missing from the original.

The Atomhenge CD issue restores the original version of the album, and includes the different versions of "High Rise" and "PXR5" as bonus tracks 14 and 15 respectively.

On 31 March 2023, Atomhenge Records (via Cherry Red) issued a new Steven Wilson mix and surround mix of the album as part of Days Of The Underground (The Studio & Live Recordings 1977-1979) 8CD/2BR boxed set.

== Track listing ==
=== Side 1 ===
1. "Death Trap" (Robert Calvert, Dave Brock) – 3:51
2. "Jack of Shadows" (Calvert, Simon House, Adrian Shaw) – 3:28
3. "Uncle Sam's on Mars" (Calvert, Brock, House, Simon King) – 5:44
4. "Infinity" (Calvert, Brock) – 4:17
5. "Life Form" (Brock) – 1:44

=== Side 2 ===
6. "Robot" (Calvert, Brock) – 8:14
7. "High Rise" (Calvert, House) – 4:36
8. "PXR5" (Brock) – 5:39

=== Atomhenge CD bonus tracks ===
9. "Jack of Shadows" [live studio version] – 3:40
10. "We Like to Be Frightened" – 2:46
11. "High Rise" [live studio version] – 4:43
12. "Robot" [first studio version] – 9:24
13. "Jack of Shadows" [Adrian Shaw vocal version] – 3:54
14. "High Rise" [alternate mix] – 4:37
15. "PXR5" [alternate mix] – 5:40
16. "Quark, Strangeness and Charm" [live 1978] – 2:38

== Personnel ==
From album liner notes

Hawkwind

- Robert Calvert – vocals (1–3, 6, 7)
- Dave Brock – guitar (except 5), bass (1, 4), synth (1, 3, 4–8), vocals (1, 3, 4–8), backing vocals (2)
- Simon House – keyboards (2, 3, 6–8), vocals (2, 7), violin (6, 8), synth (8)
- Adrian Shaw – bass guitar (2, 3, 6–8), backing vocals (2, 3, 8), vocals (6, 7)
- Simon King – drums (except 5)

== Credits ==
- Tracks 1, 2 and 8: Recorded at Rockfield Studios, January 1978
- Track 3: Recorded at Hammersmith Odeon, 5 October 1977
- Tracks 4 and 5: Recorded at Week Park Farm, 1978
- Tracks 6 and 7: Recorded at Leicester De Montfort Hall, 29 September 1977
- Mixed at Rockfield Studios, February 1978. Engineered by Dave Charles and Anton Matthews.
- Artwork by Phillip Tonkyn.

== Charts ==
Chart (1979)	Peak position
UK Albums (Official Charts)	59

== Release history ==
- June 1979: Charisma, CDS4016, UK vinyl – first 5000 contained Pete Frame's Hawkwind Family Tree poster. The original cover had artwork of an incorrectly wired UK electric plug which caused controversy on safety grounds, so subsequent copies were released with a supposedly unremovable sticker covering the offending artwork. Subsequent prints had the artwork blanked out.
- March 1984: Charisma, CHC25, UK vinyl
- April 1989: Virgin, CDSCD4016, UK CD
- March 2009: Atomhenge (Cherry Red) Records, ATOMCD1010, UK CD – the extensive sleeve notes include a reference to the artwork controversy, and the original image is reinstated. The booklet also includes the Hawkwind Family Tree.
- 31 March 2023: Atomhenge (Cherry Red) Records, ATOMCD101050, UK 8CD/2BR
