= 25 Years On =

Studio album by Hawklords
- Released: 6 October 1978
- Recorded: June–August 1978
- Studios: Langley Farm, Devon
- Genres: New wave; pop
- Length: 34:21
- Label: Charisma
- Producers: Dave Brock, Robert Calvert

Hawkwind chronology
Quark, Strangeness and Charm (1977)	25 Years On (1978)	PXR5 (1979)

Singles from 25 Years On
- 1. "25 Years" Released: 18 May 1979

Professional ratings
Review scores
Source	Rating
Allmusic	4/5 stars
The Encyclopedia of Popular Music	2/5 stars

25 Years On is the only studio album by the English rock band Hawklords, the short-lived offshoot of Hawkwind that was formed in 1978. It has since been integrated into the history of Hawkwind and is not considered by fans or critics to be the work of a different group; hence, it was later described as the eighth Hawkwind album. The album has been known as simply Hawklords at various points in its history, but Hawkwind currently refers to it by its original title 25 Years On.

== Background and recording ==
In late 1978, Hawkwind singer Robert Calvert and guitarist Dave Brock performed a one-off concert under the name Sonic Assassins with bassist Harvey Bainbridge and drummer Martin Griffin, who were members of the band Ark. Calvert and Brock both left Hawkwind in early 1978, causing that band to go on an unintended hiatus during which ownership of its name was uncertain. Hawkwind manager Doug Smith convinced Calvert and Brock to regroup, and they formed a new project under the name Hawklords due to the ongoing dispute over the original band's name. They invited Bainbridge and Griffin from the Sonic Assassins event to join the new project, while recruiting former Pilot keyboardist Steve Swindells. Hawkwind drummer Simon King, who was favoured by Calvert, was invited to join the project during its early stages, which would have given the band two drummers; King soon dropped out but then returned, so both he and Griffin played on the Hawklords studio recordings.

25 Years On was recorded at a farm in Devon using a mobile studio, and released under the Hawklords name in October 1978. The album diverged from Hawkwind's established space rock sound and explored then-emerging new wave and pop forms. It reached No. 48 on the UK album charts. The album was supported by a UK tour, after which the Hawklords project ended. Calvert temporarily retired from music, while Brock revived Hawkwind with several new members including Bainbridge and Griffin. A new remix and surround sound version of 25 Years On, engineered by Steven Wilson, was released in 2023 by Atomhenge Records as part of the Days of the Underground boxed set.

== Track listing ==
=== Side 1 ===
1. "Psi Power" (Robert Calvert, Dave Brock) – 6:06
2. "Free Fall" (Calvert, Harvey Bainbridge) – 5:13
3. "Automoton" (Calvert, Brock) – 1:13
4. "25 Years" (Brock) – 4:31

=== Side 2 ===
5. "Flying Doctor" (Calvert, Brock) – 5:38
6. "The Only Ones" (Calvert, Brock) – 4:14
7. "(Only) The Dead Dreams of the Cold War Kid" (Calvert) – 3:55
8. "The Age of the Micro Man" (Calvert, Brock) – 3:31

=== Atomhenge bonus tracks ===
9. "PSI Power" [single version] – 4:26
10. "Death Trap" [single mix] (Calvert, Brock) – 3:52
11. "25 Years" [single mix] – 3:30

=== Atomhenge bonus CD: "The Sonic Assassins" ===
1. "Over the Top" (Calvert, Brock, Bainbridge, Paul Hayles, Martin Griffin) – 7:50
2. "Magnu" (Brock) – 3:12
3. "Angels of Life" (Brock) – 1:12
4. "Freefall" (Calvert, Bainbridge) – 7:56
5. "Death Trap" (Calvert, Brock) – 4:30
6. "The Only Ones" [acoustic demo] (Calvert, Brock) – 4:38
7. "(Only) The Dead Dreams of the Cold War Kid" [demo] (Calvert) – 3:31
8. "Flying Doctor" [live studio rehearsal version] (Calvert, Brock) – 5:37
9. "25 Years" [take one] (Brock) – 8:00
10. "Assassination" – 3:56
11. "Freefall" [take two] (Calvert, Bainbridge) – 5:28
12. "Only the Dead Dreams of the Cold War Kid" [take two] (Calvert, Brock) – 3:16
13. "The Age of the Micro Man" [take one] (Calvert, Brock) – 5:44
14. "Automoton" [full extended version] (Calvert, Brock) – 2:33
15. "Digger Jam" – 2:38

== Personnel ==
Hawklords

- Robert Calvert – lead vocals, acoustic guitar (track 7)
- Dave Brock – acoustic and electric guitar, keyboards, backing vocals
- Harvey Bainbridge – bass guitar, backing vocals, synthesizers
- Steve Swindells – keyboards
- Simon King – drums (tracks 4,7,8), Congas (track 6)
- Martin Griffin – drums (tracks 1,2,5,6)

with

- Simon House – violin (tracks 6,7,8)
- Henry Lowther – trumpet (track 1)
- Les McClure – whisper voice (track 4)

== Credits ==
- Recorded: Ronnie Lane's Mobile Studio at Langley Farm, Devon.
- Produced: Robert Calvert and Dave Brock. Engineered by Dennis Smith, Neil Fawcus and Neil Mount.
- Mixed at Wessex Studios, London. Engineered by Tim Friese-Greene and Mike Shipley.
- Sleeve by Barney Bubbles and Brian Griffin.
- CD 1 tracks 9–10: A & B sides of "Psi Power" single, released as Charisma CB323 in October 1978
- CD 1 track 11: A-side of "25 Years" single, released as Charisma CB332 in May 1979
- CD 2 tracks 1–5: Sonic Assassins: Recorded at the Queens Hall, Barnstaple on 23 December 1977
- CD 2 tracks 6–15: Unreleased session tapes: Recorded at Langley Farm, Devon between June and August 1978

== Charts ==
Chart (1978)	Peak position
UK Albums (Official Charts)	48

== Release history ==
- October 1978: Charisma, CDS4014, UK vinyl. Initial copies came with an inner sleeve.
- August 1982: Charisma, CHC10, UK vinyl
- April 1989: Virgin, CDSCD4014, UK CD
- January 2009: Atomhenge (Cherry Red) Records, ATOMCD2006, UK 2CD
- 31 March 2023: Atomhenge (Cherry Red) Records, ATOMCD101050, UK 8CD/2BR
