= Hawklords (1970s band) =

Late 1970s English music group

- Genres: New wave; Pop; Space rock; Progressive rock
- Years active: 1978–1979
- Past members: Robert Calvert; Dave Brock; Harvey Bainbridge; Steve Swindells; Martin Griffin; Simon King

Hawklords were an English rock band formed in 1978 by former members of Hawkwind, which was on a temporary hiatus at the time. The band released the album 25 Years On in 1978, and then disbanded with various members returning to Hawkwind over the following several years. This band should not be confused with another band of the same name, which formed in 2008 and is also made up of former Hawkwind members.

== History ==
In December 1977, Hawkwind members Dave Brock and Robert Calvert performed a one-off gig in conjunction with the band Ark, under the name Sonic Assassins. The show included Ark's bassist Harvey Bainbridge and drummer Martin Griffin. Some recordings from this show appeared in later Hawkwind archival releases. At the end of an American tour by Hawkwind in early 1978, Calvert quit that band and completed an album that was never released, with assistance from various other Hawkwind members and associates. Also at the end of the American tour, Brock had become disillusioned with Hawkwind's recent touring struggles and temporarily quit the music business.

Hawkwind manager Doug Smith convinced Brock to return to music with a different project. In mid-1978, Brock and Calvert regrouped under the name Hawklords, deciding not to frame the project as a new Hawkwind lineup because ownership of that name was disputed at the time. Brock and Calvert invited Bainbridge and Griffin from the Sonic Assassins event to join the new project, while recruiting former Pilot keyboardist Steve Swindells. Hawkwind drummer Simon King, who was favored by Calvert, was invited to join the project during its early stages, which would have given the band two drummers; King soon dropped out but then returned, so both he and Griffin played on the Hawklords studio recordings.

Recording took place at a farm in Devon using a mobile studio, resulting in the album 25 Years On, released under the Hawklords name in October 1978. The album was supported by a UK tour, with a stage show designed by Hawkwind associate Barney Bubbles. Hawkwind bassist Lemmy made a guest appearance at one show. Budget considerations prevented the implementation of some of Bubbles's designs, leading Bubbles to leave the Hawkwind/Hawklords circle. A live album recorded during this tour was released in 1992.

After the tour, Griffin departed, making King the group's sole drummer; while Swindells departed and was not replaced. Hawklords continued for a few months into 1979, but then Brock revived the Hawkwind name and continued with that band with several new members including Bainbridge and Griffin. Calvert dropped out of music for the next few years to focus on writing, while Swindells used some material that he wrote for Hawklords on his 1980 solo album Fresh Blood.

The sole Hawklords studio album, 25 Years On, and the 1992 live album, have since been integrated into the history of Hawkwind and are not considered by fans or critics to be the works of a different group. Some Hawklords recordings, both in-studio and live, have been included in the Hawkwind archival series The Weird Tapes.

== Members ==
- Robert Calvert (vocals)
- Dave Brock (guitar)
- Harvey Bainbridge (bass)
- Steve Swindells (keyboards)
- Martin Griffin (drums)
- Simon King (drums)

== Discography ==
- 25 Years On (1978)
- Hawkords Live (1992)
