= Hawkwind =

English rock band

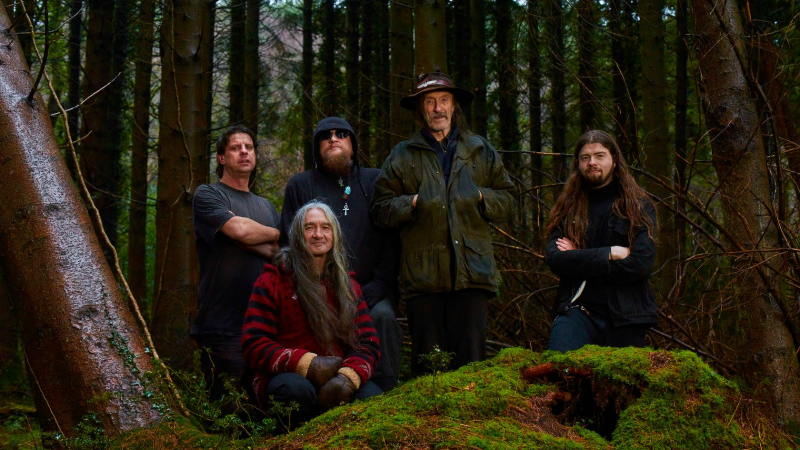
- Hawkwind in 2017

Background information
- Also known as: Hawkwind Zoo, Sonic Assassins, Hawklords, Psychedelic Warriors, Group X, Hawkwind Light Orchestra, The Elves of Silbury Hill
- Origin: Ladbroke Grove, London, England
- Genres: Space rock; hard rock; progressive rock; psychedelic rock; acid rock; proto-punk
- Years active: 1969–present
- Labels: UA; Charisma; Bronze; RCA/Active; Flicknife; GWR; EBS; Voiceprint; Cherry Red
- Spinoffs: Hawklords (1970s); Hawklords (2000s); Inner City Unit; Motörhead; Sonic Assassins; Space Ritual
- Members: Dave Brock; Richard Chadwick; Magnus Martin; Thighpaulsandra; Doug MacKinnon
- Past members: Full list
- Website: hawkwind.com

Hawkwind are an English rock band known as one of the earliest space rock groups. Since their formation in November 1969, Hawkwind have gone through many incarnations and have incorporated many different styles into their music, including hard rock, progressive rock and psychedelic rock. They are regarded as an influential proto-punk band. Their lyrics often cover themes of urban life and science fiction.

Many musicians, dancers and writers have worked with the band since their inception. Key members of Hawkwind have included Nik Turner, Huw Lloyd-Langton, Del Dettmar, Lemmy, Simon King, Robert Calvert, Michael Moorcock, Simon House and Ginger Baker, but the band are most closely associated with their singer, songwriter and guitarist Dave Brock, who is the only remaining original member.

Hawkwind are best known for the song "Silver Machine", which became a number-three UK hit single in 1972, and they had further chart singles with "Urban Guerrilla" (another top 40 hit) and "Shot Down in the Night". The band had a run of twenty-two of their albums charting in the UK from 1971 to 1993, and another nine between 2012 and 2024.

== History ==
=== 1969: Formation ===
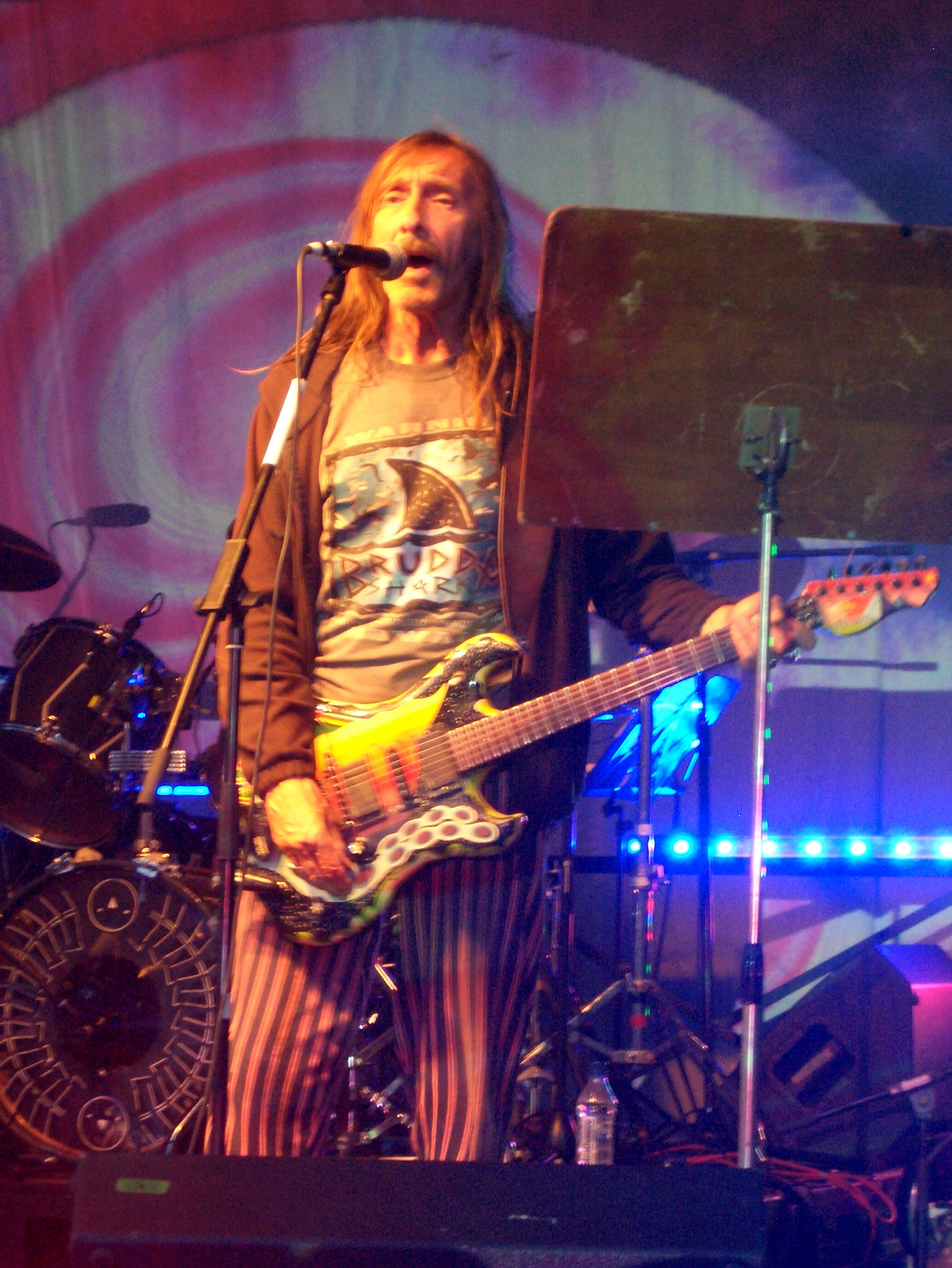
Dave Brock

Dave Brock and guitarist Mick Slattery had been in the London-based psychedelic band Famous Cure, and a meeting with bassist John Harrison revealed a mutual interest in electronic music, which led the trio to embark upon a new musical venture together. Seventeen-year-old drummer Terry Ollis replied to an advert in a music weekly; Nik Turner and Michael "Dik Mik" Davies, old acquaintances of Brock, offered help with transport and gear, but were soon pulled into the band.

Slattery and Ollis were flatting in Talbot Road near All Saints Notting Hill, where bands performed in the church hall on Friday nights. On 29 August 1969 Slattery called in as the stage was being set up and asked someone if they could play a couple of numbers later. The band did not have a name yet and the best they could come up with on the night was Group X. They were given a 10 or 15 minute spot and played a 15 or 20 minute improvisation based on (by differing accounts) either the Byrds' "Eight Miles High" or John Coltrane's "India". BBC Radio 1 DJ John Peel was in the audience, and was impressed enough to tell event organiser Douglas Smith to keep an eye on them. Smith signed them up and got them a deal with Liberty Records on the back of a deal he was setting up for Cochise.

A recording session took place at Abbey Road Studios late in the year to record demos of "Hurry on Sundown" and other tracks (which were eventually included on the remastered version of the group's debut album Hawkwind). Slattery left the band after the session, and they auditioned guitarists to replace him. One of the candidates was Huw Lloyd-Langton, who had earlier worked at the Ivor Mairants Musicentre and knew Brock, who used bought guitar strings at the Musicentre. Another candidate was a guitarist from Switzerland who happened to know Lloyd-Langton's girlfriend. The job went to Lloyd-Langton.

=== 1970–1975: United Artists era ===
By 1970, the band was called Hawkwind Zoo. "Hawkwind" started as Turner's nickname, as he had habits of noisy throat-clearing and spitting ("hawking") and flatulence ("wind"). According to Brock, they added "Zoo" to the name because "all of us acted like animals". The name was soon shortened to "Hawkwind".

The Pretty Things guitarist Dick Taylor was brought in to produce the 1970 debut album Hawkwind. Although it was not a commercial success, it did bring them to the attention of the UK underground scene, which found them playing free concerts, benefit gigs, and festivals. Playing free outside the Bath Festival, they encountered another Ladbroke Grove–based band, the Pink Fairies, who shared similar interests in music and drugs; a friendship developed which led to the two bands becoming running partners and performing as "Pinkwind". Their use of drugs, however, led to the departure of Harrison, who did not voluntarily partake, but had someone spike his drink with mescaline, to be replaced briefly by Thomas Crimble (about July 1970 – March 1971). Crimble played on a few BBC sessions (which were eventually collected on the album The Text of Festival) before leaving to help organise the Glastonbury Free Festival 1971; he sat in during the band's performance there. Lloyd-Langton also quit, after someone spiked his drink with LSD at the Isle of Wight Festival and he had a bad trip, followed by a nervous breakdown a while later.

Their follow-up album, 1971's In Search of Space, brought greater commercial success, reaching number 18 on the UK album charts. This album offered a refinement of the band's image and philosophy courtesy of graphic artist Barney Bubbles and underground press writer Robert Calvert, as depicted in the accompanying Hawklog booklet, which would be further developed into the Space Ritual stage show. Science fiction author Michael Moorcock and dancer Stacia also started contributing to the band. Dik Mik had left the band, replaced by sound engineer Del Dettmar, but chose to return for this album, thus giving the band two electronics players. Bass player Dave Anderson, who had been in the German band Amon Düül II, had also joined and played on the album, but departed before its release because of personal tensions with some other members of the band. Anderson and Lloyd-Langton then formed the short-lived band Amon Din. Meanwhile, Ollis quit, unhappy with the commercial direction in which the band were heading.

The addition of bassist Ian "Lemmy" Kilmister and drummer Simon King propelled the band to greater heights. One of the early gigs the band played was a benefit for the Greasy Truckers at The Roundhouse on 13 February 1972. A live album of the concert, Greasy Truckers Party, was released; from this, a single (with overdubbed vocal), "Silver Machine", was also released, reaching number three in the UK charts. This generated sufficient funds for the subsequent album Doremi Fasol Latido and Space Ritual tour. The show featured costumes, dancers Stacia and Miss Renee – typically performing either topless or wearing only body paint – mime artist Tony Carrera, and a light show by Liquid Len. The songs in the show were connected by electronic and spoken word segues and the show was recorded on the elaborate package Space Ritual. At the height of their success, in 1973, the band released the single "Urban Guerrilla", which coincided with an IRA bombing campaign in London, so the BBC refused to play it and the band's management reluctantly decided to withdraw it fearing accusations of opportunism, despite the disc having already climbed to number 39 in the UK chart.

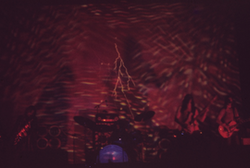
Hawkwind in St. Louis, USA, in 1974

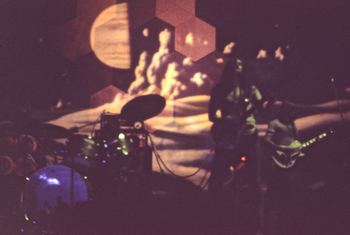
Hawkwind in St. Louis, USA, in 1974 with Planets and Clouds

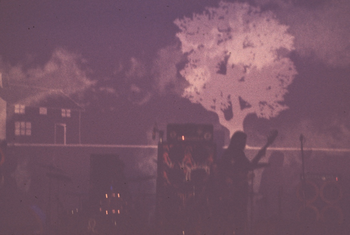
Hawkwind Hall of the Mountain Grill Tree and Progress(?)-Early

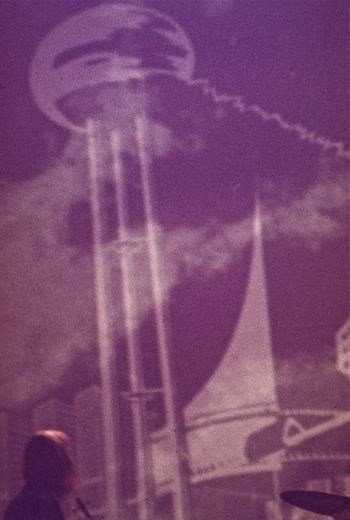
Hawkwind Hall of the Mountain Grill Tree and Progress(?)-Future

Dik Mik departed during 1973, and Calvert ended his association with the band to concentrate on solo projects. Dettmar also indicated that he was to leave the band, so Simon House was recruited as keyboardist and violinist playing live shows, a North America tour and recording the 1974 album Hall of the Mountain Grill. Dettmar left after a European tour and emigrated to Canada, whilst Alan Powell deputised for an incapacitated King on that European tour, but remained, giving the band two drummers.

At the beginning of 1975, the band recorded the album Warrior on the Edge of Time in collaboration with Michael Moorcock, loosely based on his Eternal Champion figure. However, during a North American tour in May, Lemmy was caught in possession of amphetamine crossing the border from the US into Canada. The border police mistook the powder for cocaine and he was jailed, forcing the band to cancel some shows. Fed up with his erratic behaviour, the band dismissed the bass player replacing him with their long-standing friend and former Pink Fairies guitarist Paul Rudolph. Lemmy then teamed up with another Pink Fairies guitarist, Larry Wallis, to form Motörhead, named after the last song he had written for Hawkwind.

=== 1976–1978: Charisma era ===
Calvert made a guest appearance with the band for their headline set at the Reading Festival in August 1975, after which he chose to rejoin the band as a full-time lead vocalist. Stacia left to pursue family life. The band changed record company to Tony Stratton-Smith's Charisma Records and, on Stratton-Smith's suggestion, band management from Douglas Smith to Tony Howard.

Astounding Sounds, Amazing Music is the first album of this era. On the eve of recording the follow-up "Back on the Streets" single, Turner was dismissed for his erratic live playing and Powell was deemed surplus to requirements. After a tour to promote the single and during the recording of the next album, Rudolph was also dismissed, for allegedly trying to steer the band into a musical direction at odds with Calvert and Brock's vision.

Adrian "Ade" Shaw, who, as bass player for Magic Muscle, had supported Hawkwind on the Space Ritual tour, came in for the 1977 album Quark, Strangeness and Charm. The band continued to enjoy moderate commercial success, but Calvert's mental illness often caused problems. A manic phase saw the band abandon a European tour in France, while a depression phase during a 1978 North American tour convinced Brock to disband the group. In between these two tours, the band had recorded the album PXR5 in January 1978, but its release was delayed until 1979.

On 23 December 1977 in Barnstaple, Brock and Calvert had performed a one-off gig with Devon band Ark as the Sonic Assassins, along with bassist Harvey Bainbridge and drummer Martin Griffin. At the end of an American tour in 1978, Calvert quit Hawkwind while the band split from their management causing Hawkwind to go on an intended hiatus. Calvert formed an offshoot band called Hawklords and finished a new album, but abandoned it in favour of another new album recorded with Brock, Bainbridge, Griffin (all from the Sonic Assassins event) plus newly recruited keyboardist Steve Swindells. Recording took place on a farm in Devon using a mobile studio, resulting in the album 25 Years On, released under the Hawklords name.

King had originally been the drummer for the Hawklords project but quit during recording sessions to return to London, while House, who had temporarily left the band to join a David Bowie tour, elected to remain with Bowie full-time, but nevertheless contributed violin to these sessions. At the end of the band's UK tour, Calvert, wanting King back in the band, dismissed Griffin, then promptly resigned himself, choosing to pursue a career in literature. Swindells left to record a solo album after an offer had been made to him by the record company ATCO.

=== 1979–1986: Bronze, RCA and independents ===
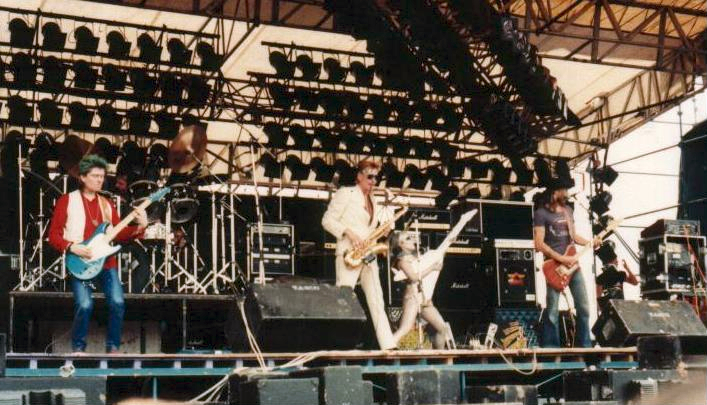
Hawkwind playing at the Monsters of Rock festival in Donington Park in 1982

In late 1979, Hawkwind reformed with Brock, Bainbridge and King being joined by Huw Lloyd-Langton (who had played on the debut album) and Tim Blake (formerly of Gong), debuting at the first Futurama (The World's First Science Fiction Music Festival) on 9 September in Leeds, and then embarking upon a UK tour despite not having a record deal or any product to promote. Some shows were recorded and a deal was made with Bronze Records, resulting in the Live Seventy Nine album, quickly followed by the studio album Levitation. However, during the recording of Levitation King quit and Ginger Baker was drafted in for the sessions, but he chose to stay with the band for the tour, during which Blake left to be replaced by Keith Hale.

In 1981 Baker and Hale left after their insistence that Bainbridge should be dismissed was ignored, and Brock and Bainbridge elected to handle synthesisers and sequencers themselves, with drummer Griffin from the Hawklords rejoining. Three albums, which again saw Moorcock contributing lyrics and vocals, were recorded for RCA/Active: Sonic Attack, the electronic Church of Hawkwind and Choose Your Masques. This band headlined the 1981 Glastonbury Festival and made an appearance at the 1982 Donington Monsters of Rock Festival, as well as continuing to play the summer solstice at Stonehenge Free Festival.

In the early 1980s, Brock had started using drum machines for his home demos and became increasingly frustrated at the inability of drummers to keep perfect time, leading to a succession of drummers coming and going. First, Griffin was ousted and the band tried King again, but, unhappy with his playing at that time, he was rejected. Andy Anderson briefly joined while he was also playing for the Cure, and Robert Heaton also filled the spot briefly prior to the rise of New Model Army. Lloyd Langton Group drummer John Clark did some recording sessions, and in late 1983 Rick Martinez joined the band to play drums on the Earth Ritual tour in February and March 1984, later replaced by Clive Deamer.

Turner had returned as a guest for the 1982 Choose Your Masques tour and was invited back permanently. Further tours ensued with Phil "Dead Fred" Reeves augmenting the line-up on keyboards and violin, but neither Turner nor Reeves would appear on the only recording of 1983–84, The Earth Ritual Preview; however, there was a guest spot for Lemmy. The Earth Ritual tour was filmed for Hawkwind's first video release, Night of the Hawk.

Alan Davey was a young fan of the band who had sent a tape of his playing to Brock, and Brock chose to oust Reeves moving Bainbridge from bass to keyboards to accommodate Davey. This experimental line-up played at the Stonehenge Free Festival in 1984, which was filmed and release as Stonehenge 84. Subsequent personal and professional tensions between Brock and Turner led to the latter's expulsion at the beginning of 1985. Clive Deamer, who was deemed "too professional" for the band, was eventually replaced in 1985 by Danny Thompson Jr (son of folk-rock bassist Danny Thompson), a friend of Alan Davey, and remained almost to the end of the decade.

Hawkwind's association with Moorcock climaxed in their most ambitious project, The Chronicle of the Black Sword, based loosely around the Elric series of books and theatrically staged with Tony Crerar as the central character. Moorcock contributed lyrics, but only performed some spoken pieces on some live dates. The tour was recorded and issued as an album Live Chronicles and video The Chronicle of the Black Sword. The band also performed at the Worldcon (World Science Fiction Convention) in Brighton.

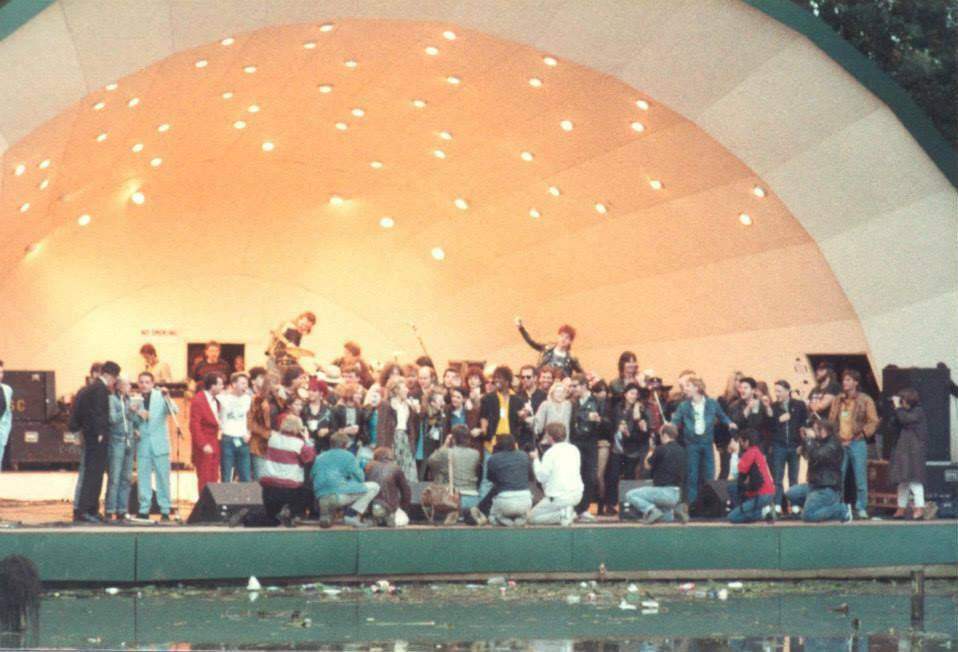
Vera Lynn, Hawkwind, and others at Crystal Palace Bowl, 24 August 1985

In August 1985, The band performed at Crystal Palace Bowl, with several other rock bands, for a benefit concert for Pete Townshend's Double-O anti-heroin charity. Lemmy and Stacia were reunited with the band for this event. Vera Lynn preceded Hawkwinds set.

=== 1986–1999: GWR through to EBS ===
A headline appearance at the 1986 Reading Festival was followed by a UK tour to promote the Live Chronicles album which was filmed and released as Chaos. In 1988 the band recorded the album The Xenon Codex with Guy Bidmead, but all was not well in the band and soon after, both Lloyd-Langton and Thompson departed.

Drummer Richard Chadwick, who joined in the summer of 1988, had been playing in small alternative free festival bands, most notably Bath's Smart Pils, for a decade and had frequently crossed paths with Hawkwind and Brock. He was initially invited simply to play with the band, but eventually replaced stand in drummer Mick Kirton to become the band's drummer to the present day.

To fill in the gap of lead sound, lost when Lloyd-Langton left, violinist House was re-instated into the line-up in 1989 (having previously been a member from 1974 until 1978), and, notably, Hawkwind embarked on their first North American visit in eleven years (since the somewhat disastrous 1978 tour), in which House did not partake. The successfully received tour was the first of several over the coming years, in an effort by the band to re-introduce themselves to the American market.

Bridget Wishart, an associate of Chadwick's from the festival circuit, also joined to become the band's one and only singing front-woman, the band had been fronted in earlier days by Stacia but only as a dancer. This band produced two albums, 1990's Space Bandits and 1991's Palace Springs and also filmed a one-hour appearance for the Bedrock TV series with dancer Julie Murray-Anderson, who performed with Hawkwind between 1988 and 1991.

1990 saw Hawkwind tour North America again, the second instalment in a series of American visits made at around this time in an effort to re-establish the Hawkwind brand in America. The original business plan was to hold three consecutive US tours, annually, from 1989 to 1991, with the first losing money, the second breaking even, and the third turning a profit, ultimately bringing Hawkwind back into recognition across the Atlantic. Progress, however, was somewhat stunted, due to ex-member Nik Turner touring the United States with his own band at the time, in which the shows were often marketed as Hawkwind.

Still supporting Space Bandits, 1991 commenced with perhaps the most surprising Hawkwind tour in the band's history, without Dave Brock. Brock's temporary replacement was former Smart Pils guitarist Steve Bemand (who had played with Chadwick and Wishart in the Demented Stoats). The tour began in Amsterdam on 12 March and took in Germany, Greece, Italy and France before wrapping up in Belgium on 10 April after 24 dates.

In 1991 Bainbridge, House and Wishart departed and the band continued as a three piece relying heavily on synthesisers and sequencers to create a wall-of-sound. The 1992 album Electric Tepee combined hard rock and light ambient pieces, while It is the Business of the Future to be Dangerous is almost devoid of the rock leanings. The Business Trip is a record of the previous album's tour, but rockier as would be expected from a live outing. The White Zone album was released under the alias Psychedelic Warriors to distance itself entirely from the rock expectancy of Hawkwind.

A general criticism of techno music at that time was its facelessness and lack of personality, which the band were coming to feel also plagued them. Ron Tree had known the band on the festival circuit and offered his services as a front-man, and the band duly employed him for the album Alien 4 and its accompanying tour which resulted in the album Love in Space and video.

In 1996, unhappy with the musical direction of the band, bassist Davey left, forming his own Middle-Eastern flavoured hard-rock group Bedouin and a Motörhead tribute act named Ace of Spades. His bass playing role was reluctantly picked up by singer Tree and the band were joined full-time by lead guitarist Jerry Richards (another stalwart of the festival scene, playing for Tubilah Dog who had merged with Brock's Agents of Chaos during 1988) for the albums Distant Horizons and In Your Area. Rasta chanter Captain Rizz also joined the band for guest spots during live shows.

=== 1999–2007: Anniversaries, disputes and Voiceprint ===
Hawkestra—a re-union event featuring appearances from past and present members—had originally been intended to coincide with the band's 30th anniversary and the release of the career spanning Epocheclipse – 30 Year Anthology set, but logistical problems delayed it until 21 October 2000. It took place at the Brixton Academy with about 20 members taking part in a more than 3-hour set, which was filmed and recorded. Guests included Samantha Fox who sang "Master of the Universe". However, arguments and disputes over financial recompense and musical input resulted in the prospect of the event being re-staged unlikely, and any album or DVD release being indefinitely shelved.

The Hawkestra had set a template for Brock to assemble a core band of Tree, Brock, Richards, Davey, Chadwick and for the use of former members as guests on live shows and studio recordings. The 2000 Christmas Astoria show was recorded with contributions from House, Blake, Rizz, Moorcock, Jez Huggett and Keith Kniveton and released as Yule Ritual the following year. In 2001, Davey agreed to rejoin the band permanently, but only after the departure of Tree and Richards.

Meanwhile, having rekindled relationships with old friends at the Hawkestra, Turner organised further Hawkestra gigs resulting in the formation of xhawkwind.com, a band consisting mainly of ex-Hawkwind members and playing old Hawkwind songs. An appearance at Guilfest in 2002 led to confusion as to whether this actually was Hawkwind, sufficiently irking Brock into taking legal action to prohibit Turner from trading under the name Hawkwind. Turner lost the case and the band began performing as Space Ritual.

An appearance at the Canterbury Sound Festival in August 2001, resulting in another live album Canterbury Fayre 2001, saw guest appearances from Lloyd-Langton, House, Kniveton with Arthur Brown on "Silver Machine". The band organised the first of their own weekend festivals, named Hawkfest, in Devon in the summer of 2002. Brown joined the band in 2002 for a winter tour which featured some Kingdom Come songs and saw appearances from Blake and Lloyd-Langton, the Newcastle show being released on DVD as Out of the Shadows and the London show on CD as Spaced Out in London.

A new album, Take Me to Your Leader, was released in 2005. Recorded by the core band of Brock/Davey/Chadwick, contributors included new keyboardist Jason Stuart, Arthur Brown, tabloid writer and TV personality Matthew Wright, 1970s New Wave singer Lene Lovich, Simon House and Jez Huggett. This was followed in 2006 by the CD/DVD Take Me to Your Future.

The band were the subject of an hour-long television documentary titled Hawkwind: Do Not Panic that aired on BBC Four as part of the Originals series. It was broadcast on 30 March 2007 and repeated on 10 August 2007. Although Brock participated in its making, he did not appear in the programme; it is alleged that he requested all footage of himself be removed after he was denied any artistic control over the documentary. One of the documentary's opening narratives states that Brock declined to be interviewed for the programme because of Nik Turner's involvement, thus indicating that the two men had still not reconciled over the xhawkwind.com incident.

December 2006 saw the official departure of Alan Davey, who left to perform and record with two new bands: Gunslinger and Thunor. He was replaced by Mr Dibs, a long-standing member of the road crew. The band performed at their annual Hawkfest festival and headlined the US festival Nearfest and played gigs in PA and NY. At the end of 2007, Tim Blake once again joined the band filling the lead role playing keyboards and theremin. The band played five Christmas dates, the London show being released as an audio CD and video DVD under the title Knights of Space.

=== 2008–2016: Atomhenge and Eastworld ===
In January 2008 the band reversed its anti-taping policy – which had long been a sore point with many fans – announcing that it would allow audio recording and non-commercial distribution of such recordings, provided there was no competing official release. At the end of 2008, Atomhenge Records (a subsidiary of Cherry Red Records) commenced the re-issuing of Hawkwind's back catalogue from the years 1976 through to 1997 with the release of two triple CD anthologies Spirit of the Age (anthology 1976–84) and The Dream Goes On (anthology 1985–97).

On 8 September 2008 keyboard player Jason Stuart died due to a brain haemorrhage. In October 2008, Niall Hone (former Tribe of Cro) joined Hawkwind for their winter 2008 tour playing guitar, along with returning synth/theremin player Tim Blake. In this period, Hone also occasionally played bass guitar alongside Mr Dibs and used laptops for live electronic improvisation.

In 2009, the band began occasionally featuring Jon Sevink from The Levellers as guest violinist at some shows. Later that year, Hawkwind embarked on a winter tour to celebrate the band's 40th anniversary, including two gigs on 28 and 29 August marking the anniversary of their first live performances. In 2010, Hawkwind held their annual Hawkfest at the site of the original Isle of Wight Festival, marking the 40th anniversary of their appearance there.

On 21 June 2010, Hawkwind released a studio album entitled Blood of the Earth on Eastworld Records. During and since the Blood of the Earth support tours, Hone's primary on-stage responsibility shifted to bass, while Mr. Dibs moved to a more traditional lead singer/front man role.

In 2011, Hawkwind toured Australia for the second time.

April 2012 saw the release of a new album, Onward, again on Eastworld. Keyboardist Dead Fred rejoined Hawkwind for the 2012 tour in support of Onward and has since remained with the band. In November 2012, Brock, Chadwick and Hone—credited as "Hawkwind Light Orchestra"—released Stellar Variations on Esoteric Recordings.

2013 marked the first Hawkeaster, a two-day festival held in Seaton, Devon during the Easter weekend. A US tour was booked for October 2013, but due to health issues, was postponed and later cancelled.

In February 2014, as part of a one-off Space Ritual performance, Hawkwind performed at the O2 Shepherd's Bush Empire featuring an appearance by Brian Blessed for the spoken word element of Sonic Attack; a studio recording of this performance was released as a single in September 2014. Later in the year, former Soft Machine guitarist John Etheridge joined the live line-up of the band, though he had departed again prior to early 2015 dates.

Following Hawkeaster 2015, Hawkwind made their debut visit to Japan, playing two sold-out shows in Tokyo. Hawkwind performed two Solstice Ritual shows in December 2015, with Steve Hillage guesting, and Haz Wheaton joining Hawkwind on bass guitar. Wheaton is a former member of the band's road crew who had previously appeared with Technicians of Spaceship Hawkwind, a "skeleton crew" spin off live band. Additionally, he had guested on bass for Dave Brock's solo album Brockworld released earlier in the year.

=== 2016–present: Cherry Red projects ===
The band released The Machine Stops on 15 April 2016, a concept album based on E.M. Forster's short story of the same name. Brock and Chadwick were joined on the recording by Hone, Dibs and Wheaton sharing bass duties, while Hone and Dead Fred contributed one solo piece each. The album entered the UK album chart at number 29. Dead Fred's last live appearance was at Eastbourne Winter Gardens on 1 April; Hone took on keyboard and synth duties until Blake returned for the summer shows.

The trio of Brock, Chadwick and Wheaton recorded the album Into the Woods, released on 5 May 2017, with additional contributions from Dibs, Magnus Martin (whose band Tarantism had supported Hawkwind on many occasions) and Big Bill Barry. Martin and saxophonist Michał Sosna (from Polish group hipiersoniK) joined the band for a 16-date UK promotional tour in the same month, and festival appearances at Hellfest, Clisson, France in June and Bluedot Festival at Jodrell Bank Observatory, Cheshire in July. The Roundhouse gig, with a guest appearance from Phil Campbell, was released as Hawkwind At The Roundhouse on 8 December in 2CD/DVD and 3LP formats.

For the Into The Woods tour the group had performed an opening acoustic set before the main set, and they decided to capture some acoustic performances of their 1970s repertoire in the studio. A chance meeting with Mike Batt by Brock at the US Embassy brought him into the project contributing production, arrangement and additional orchestrations. The album Road to Utopia was released on 14 September 2018. There was a guest appearance from Eric Clapton, who Brock had performed with as a duo in the 1960s prior to his rise to fame in the Yardbirds. There was also a guest appearance of the band's former sax player, Jez Huggett, who's featured on "The Age of the Micro Man". The band played at Dreamland Margate with the Fierce and the Dead. Batt conducted a series of concerts titled In Search of Utopia – Infinity and Beyond featuring the band and Docklands Sinfonia Orchestra in October and November, with Arthur Brown guesting. After the recording of the album but before the shows, both Wheaton and Dibs left, while Hone rejoined on bass. Wheaton went on to join Electric Wizard, and Dibs stated "irreconcilable differences" on the Hawkwind fans Facebook page, Brock claiming "we propped the fella up and kept him in the band longer than he should have been, because we were genuinely concerned... about his state of mind."

In October 2019 the group released All Aboard the Skylark, marketed as a return to their space rock roots. This was the first album with the line-up of Brock, Chadwick, Hone and Martin. Accompanying the CD version, and sold as a separate vinyl LP, was Acoustic Daze which included tracks from the Road to Utopia minus the additions of Batt and Clapton. The album was promoted with a 15 date tour of Britain in November, culminating in a final show at London's Royal Albert Hall. The group were augmented by keyboard player Blake, with guest appearances from Phil Campbell and Clapton. A record of the live show titled 50th Anniversary Live, with the guest appearance from Campbell, is released on 4 December 2020 by Cherry Red in 3LP and 2CD formats.

Brock had started work on new material in his home studio with some contributions from Chadwick and Martin when the COVID-19 pandemic spread curtailing any further band activity. Brock would continue work with remote contributions from Martin, and the album Carnivorous (an anagram of coronavirus) was released in October 2020 under the name Hawkwind Light Orchestra to reflect the reduced personnel.

When the group returned to live performances post-COVID in late 2021, the line-up featured Brock, Chadwick, Martin and new members Thighpaulsandra on keyboards and Doug MacKinnon on bass, replacing Blake and Hone respectively. A new Hawkwind album, Somnia, was released in 2021, followed in 2023 by The Future Never Waits and in 2024 by Stories from Time and Space. The live album Live at the Royal Albert Hall recorded on 29 September 2023 was released on 13 December 2024 in 3CD a 3LP formats, the CD issue containing a bonus CD of studio rehearsals. Brown joined the band for this performance reciting the poems.

== Influence and legacy ==
Eduardo Rivadavia of Loudwire wrote: "With all due respect to the ethereal Pink Floyd, late-blooming UFO, and Mothership funk rockers Parliament, the heavy crown of '70s space rock belongs to the one and only Hawkwind, who embraced the stars like few bands before them or since."

Hawkwind have been cited as an influence by artists such as Al Jourgensen of Ministry, Monster Magnet, the Sex Pistols (who covered "Silver Machine"), Henry Rollins and Dez Cadena of Black Flag, Siobhan Fahey, Ty Segall, the Mekano Set, Ozric Tentacles., King Gizzard & the Lizard Wizard, and Neurosis.

Hard rock musician Lemmy of the band Motörhead gained a lot from his tenure in Hawkwind. He said: "I really found myself as an instrumentalist in Hawkwind. Before that I was just a guitar player who was pretending to be good, when actually I was no good at all. In Hawkwind I became a good bass player. It was where I learned I was good at something."

== Members ==
Current members

- Dave Brock – vocals, guitars, keyboards, synthesisers (1969–present)
- Richard Chadwick – drums, vocals (1988–present)
- Magnus Martin – guitars, vocals, keyboards (2016–present)
- Thighpaulsandra – keyboards, synthesizers (2021–present)
- Doug MacKinnon – bass (2021–present)

== Discography ==
- Hawkwind (1970)
- In Search of Space (1971)
- Doremi Fasol Latido (1972)
- Hall of the Mountain Grill (1974)
- Warrior on the Edge of Time (1975)
- Astounding Sounds, Amazing Music (1976)
- Quark, Strangeness and Charm (1977)
- 25 Years On – Released as Hawklords (1978)
- PXR5 (1979)
- Levitation (1980)
- Sonic Attack (1981)
- Church of Hawkwind – Released as Church of Hawkwind (1982)
- Choose Your Masques (1982)
- The Chronicle of the Black Sword (1985)
- The Xenon Codex (1988)
- Space Bandits (1990)
- Palace Springs (1991)
- Electric Tepee (1992)
- It Is the Business of the Future to Be Dangerous (1993)
- White Zone – Released as Psychedelic Warriors (1995)
- Alien 4 (1995)
- Love in Space (1996)
- Distant Horizons (1997)
- In Your Area (1999)
- Spacebrock (2000)
- Take Me to Your Leader (2005)
- Take Me to Your Future (2006)
- Blood of the Earth (2010)
- Onward (2012)
- Stellar Variations – Released as Hawkwind Light Orchestra (2012)
- The Machine Stops (2016)
- Into the Woods (2017)
- The Road to Utopia (2018)
- All Aboard the Skylark (2019)
- Carnivorous – Released as Hawkwind Light Orchestra (2020)
- Somnia (2021)
- The Future Never Waits (2023)
- Stories from Time and Space (2024)
- There Is No Space for Us (2025)
- Psychedelic Selection (2026)

== Videography ==
- 1984 – Night of the Hawks – 60 min concert
- 1984 – Stonehenge – 60 min concert with The Enid and Roy Harper
- 1984 – Stonehenge – 60 min concert
- 1985 – The Chronicle of the Black Sword – 60 min concert
- 1986 – Bristol Custom Bike Show – 15 min concert with Voodoo Child
- 1986 – Chaos – 60 min concert
- 1989 – Treworgey Tree Fayre – 90 min concert
- 1990 – Nottingham – 60 min TV concert
- 1990 – Bournemouth Academy – 90 min concert
- 1992 – Brixton Academy – 123 min concert
- 1995 – Love in Space – 90 min concert
- 2002 – Out of the Shadows – 90 min concert
- 2008 – Knights of Space – 90 min concert
- 2014 – Space Ritual Live – 140 min concert

== Sources ==
- Buckley, Peter (2003). The Rough Guide to Rock. London: Rough Guides. ISBN 1-85828-201-2.
