= Robert Calvert =

English poet, writer, musician (1945–1988)

Background information
- Born: Robert Newton Calvert; 9 March 1945; Pretoria, South Africa
- Died: 14 August 1988 (aged 43) Ramsgate, England
- Genre: Space rock
- Occupations: Singer; writer; poet; musician
- Instruments: Vocals; guitar; percussion
- Formerly of: Hawkwind; Sonic Assassins; Hawklords

Robert Newton Calvert (9 March 1945 – 14 August 1988) was a South African-British writer, poet, and musician. He is principally known for his role as lyricist, performance poet and lead vocalist of the space rock band Hawkwind.

== Early life ==
Calvert was born in Pretoria, South Africa, and moved with his parents to England when he was two. He attended school in London and Margate, living in a flat in Arlington House. Having finished school he joined the Air Training Corps, in which he became a corporal and played trumpet for the 438 Squadron band. He then went on to college in Canterbury. After leaving college, and having been denied his childhood dream of becoming a fighter pilot, he slowly acquainted himself with the UK's bohemian scene. Calvert began his career in earnest by writing poetry.

== Career ==
In 1967 he formed the street theatre group 'Street Dada Nihilismus'.

At the end of the 1960s, he returned to London and joined the city's flourishing psychedelic subculture. He soon became one of its most active members; joining, amongst other activities, Frendz, one of the leading underground magazines of the time. During that time he acquainted himself with New Wave science fiction writers and befriended author Michael Moorcock. Calvert's poems were published in New Worlds and other magazines. Although he was influenced by the New Wave, Calvert developed a distinct style of his own. His ability to change fluently between poetry, music and theatre allowed him to develop into a multimedia artist.

=== Hawkwind ===
A childhood friend of Hawkwind co-founder Nik Turner, Calvert joined Hawkwind as a lyricist, performance poet and occasional lead vocalist in 1971. Following a two-year absence, he rejoined as the band's principal lead vocalist in 1975 before leaving once again in 1979. Calvert co-wrote Hawkwind's hit single "Silver Machine", which reached No. 3 in the UK Singles Chart. Although Lemmy sings on the single version, this is an overdub of a live recording taken at the Roundhouse in London with Calvert on vocals. "They tried everyone else singing it except me", Lemmy later said. Calvert also directed the Space Ritual tour, which is widely perceived as the band's artistic zenith.

During periods away from Hawkwind duties, Calvert worked on his solo career; his solo creative output included albums, stage plays, poetry, and a novel. His first solo album, Captain Lockheed and the Starfighters, was released in 1974. The record is a concept album, an amalgam of music and theatre focused around the Lockheed bribery scandals. In 1975, he won the Capital Radio poetry competition with his poem "Circle Line". In 1975, musician and producer Brian Eno, who had also played synthesizer on and contributed sound effects to his aforementioned debut, produced and reprised his duties on synthesizer on Calvert's second solo album, Lucky Leif and the Longships, a concept album which looked at the history of the US and the Vikings, who crossed the Atlantic to reach America before Columbus. In 1977, Hawkwind performed "Quark, Strangeness and Charm" on Marc Bolan's TV series, Marc.

As well as Michael Moorcock and Brian Eno, Calvert's collaborators included Arthur Brown, Steve Peregrin Took, Jim Capaldi, Steve Pond, Inner City Unit, Vivian Stanshall, Nektar, John Greaves, Adrian Wagner, Amon Düül II and, posthumously, Spirits Burning, Dave Brock, and Krankschaft.

Calvert suffered from bipolar disorder, which often caused a fractious relationship with his fellow musicians. At one point he was sectioned under the Mental Health Act.

== Death ==
Aged 43, Calvert died of a heart attack in 1988 in Ramsgate, England, outside of the "Corner House" café. As he approached the street, he reached for a pay phone, but the nearest phone had been disconnected. He was buried in Minster Cemetery at Minster-in-Thanet. His gravestone is engraved with the line "Love's not Time's fool", from William Shakespeare's sonnet 116.

== Discography ==
=== Studio albums ===
- Captain Lockheed and the Starfighters (1974)
- Lucky Leif and the Longships (1975)
- Hype (1981)
- Freq (1985)
- Test-Tube Conceived (1986)

=== Live albums ===
- At the Queen Elizabeth Hall (Clear Records 1989, live album recorded on 1 October 1986. Reissued in 1993 as BGOCD 187)
- Robert Calvert and Maximum Effect Live at The Stars And Stripes, Carlisle (Stereo Records, 2009)
- Radio Egypt (Voiceprint VP384, rehearsals recorded at S Nicholas Barn, 26 September 1987, released 2006)
- The Right Stuff (Voiceprint VP385, recorded at Middlesbrough Polytechnic, 10 May 1986, released 2006)
- In Vitro Breed (Voiceprint VP387, recorded at The International, Manchester, 25 October 1987, released 2006. Double CD)
- Ship Of Fools (Voiceprint VP389, recorded at The Riverside, Newcastle, 2 November 1987, released 2006. Double CD)

=== With Hawkwind ===
- Space Ritual (1973)
- Astounding Sounds, Amazing Music (1976)
- Quark, Strangeness and Charm (1977)
- 25 Years On (1978) (under the name Hawklords)
- PXR5 (1979)

=== With Dave Brock ===
- The Brock/Calvert Project - "The Brock/Calvert Project" (2007) (includes readings from Centigrade 232)

=== Guest appearances ===
- Adrian Wagner – Distances Between Us (1974)
- Nektar – Down To Earth (1974)
- The Imperial Pompadours – Ersatz (1982)
- Amon Düül – Die Lösung (recorded 1988, released 1989)
- Spirits Burning - "Reflections In A Radio Show" (2001) (Includes readings from Centigrade 232)
- Krankschaft – The Flame Red Superstar (re-recordings 2010)

== Bibliography ==
=== Plays ===
- The Stars That Play With Laughing Sam's Dice (1976, about Jimi Hendrix)
- Mirror Mirror (1978, premiered at Pentameters Theatre with Eva Gray in the role of Eleanor Bryant, reprised in 2013 and in April 2019)
- The Kid From Silicon Gulch (1981)
- Test-tube Baby of Mine (1986) directed by Paul Jerricho, with Chris Cresswell and Ghislaine Rump in the cast

=== Poetry collections ===
- Centigrade 232 (1977)
- The Earth Ritual (1987)

=== Novels ===
- Hype (New English Library, 1981)
