= Masters of the Universe (Hawkwind album) =

Compilation album by Hawkwind
- Released: 25 February 1977
- Recorded: 1971–1974
- Genre: Space rock
- Label: EMI
- Producer: Doug Bennett (side two, tracks 3 & 4), George Chkiantz (side one, track 1), Hawkwind

Hawkwind chronology
| Roadhawks (1976) | Masters of the Universe (1977) | Repeat Performance (1980) |

Professional ratings
Review scores
| Source | Rating |
|---|---|
| Allmusic | 3/5 stars |
| The Encyclopedia of Popular Music | 2/5 stars |

Masters of the Universe is a 1977 compilation album by Hawkwind covering the years 1971 to 1974 while the group were contracted to United Artists Records. It is the group's second compilation album, after the previous year's Roadhawks, and was compiled and released without the band's input or approval.

== Track listing ==
=== Side one ===
1. "Master of the Universe" (Nik Turner, Dave Brock) – 6:19 – from In Search of Space (1971)
2. "Brainstorm" (Turner) – 10:44 – from Doremi Fasol Latido (1972)

=== Side two ===
3. "Sonic Attack" (Michael Moorcock) – 2:59 – from A Space Ritual Alive (1973)
4. "Orgone Accumulator" (Robert Calvert, Brock) – 10:00 – from A Space Ritual Alive (1973)
5. "It's So Easy" (Brock) – 5:21 – B-side of "The Psychedelic Warlords (Disappear in Smoke)" single
6. "Lost Johnny" (Ian Kilmister, Mick Farren) – 3:28 – from Hall of the Mountain Grill (1974)

== Personnel ==
- Robert Calvert – vocals (tracks 3 and 4)
- Dave Brock – vocals (track 5), guitar
- Del Dettmar – synthesizer, keyboards
- DikMik – audio generator (except 5 and 6)
- Nik Turner – vocals (tracks 1 and 2), flute, saxophone
- Dave Anderson – bass (track 1)
- Lemmy Kilmister – bass (except track 1), guitar and vocals (track 6)
- Terry Ollis – drums (track 1)
- Simon King – drums (except track 1)
- Simon House – synthesizer, violin, keyboards (tracks 5 and 6)

== Release history ==
- 25 Feb 1977: United Artists, UAG 30025
- May 1982: EMI Fame, FA3008
- Aug 1987: Liberty, EMS1258
- May 1989: EMI Fame, FA3220, CD
