= Roadhawks =

Compilation album by Hawkwind
- Released: 1976
- Genre: Space rock
- Length: 39:36
- Label: United Artists
- Producers: Dick Taylor (side 1, tracks 1, 2), Doctor Technical (side one, track 4), Doug Bennett (side two, track 3), Hawkwind

Hawkwind chronology
Roadhawks (1976)	Masters of the Universe (1977)

Professional ratings
Review scores
Source	Rating
Allmusic	3/5 stars

Roadhawks is a 1976 compilation album by Hawkwind covering the years 1970–1975, and it peaked at number 45 on the UK album charts. It is the first compilation release from the group, marking the end of the group's tenure with United Artists Records. The music was compiled and mixed by the group's Dave Brock.

The tracks are mostly presented in chronological order. The singles "Silver Machine" and "Urban Guerrilla" were included on an album for the first time, "Urban Guerilla" having been scarcely available due to its withdrawal after three weeks of release. A previously unreleased live version of "You Shouldn't Do That" segued with an unlisted "Seeing It As You Really Are" is included, recorded from the same live shows where Space Ritual was derived, and is now included as a bonus track on CD re-issues of the Space Ritual album.

The album was re-issued in May 2020 sourced from the original United Artists master tape by Atomhenge, Hawkwind's dedicated Cherry Red Records sub label. This re-issue includes the first release of the album on CD which along with the vinyl re-issue features restored artwork. Both physical re-issues feature gatefold or digipack sleeves and a reproduction of the poster from the 1976 first pressing.

== Track listing ==
=== Side one ===
1. "Hurry on Sundown" (Dave Brock, Hawkwind) – 4:51 – from Hawkwind (1970)
2. "Paranoia" [edit] (Brock, Hawkwind) – 4:11 – from Hawkwind (1970)
3. "You Shouldn't Do That" (Nik Turner, Brock) – 6:55 – live version previously unreleased, included on Space Ritual (CD re-issue) (1973)
4. "Silver Machine" (Robert Calvert, Brock) – 4:23 – single previously unreleased on LP, included on In Search of Space (CD re-issue) (1972)

=== Side two ===
5. "Urban Guerilla" (Calvert, Brock) – 3:39 – single previously unreleased on LP, included on Doremi Fasol Latido (CD re-issue) (1973)
6. "Space Is Deep" (Brock) – 6:03 – from Doremi Fasol Latido (1972)
7. "Wind of Change" (Brock) – 4:56 – from Hall of the Mountain Grill (1974)
8. "The Golden Void" (Brock) – 4:38 – from Warrior on the Edge of Time (1975)

== Personnel ==
- Robert Calvert – vocals (track 5)
- Dave Brock – vocals (track 1, 6, 8), guitar, harmonica (track 1), 12-string acoustic guitar (track 1)
- Nik Turner – vocals (track 3), flute, saxophone
- John Harrison – bass (tracks 1 and 2)
- Lemmy Kilmister – bass (tracks 3 to 8), vocals (track 4)
- Terry Ollis – drums (tracks 1 and 2)
- Simon King – drums (tracks 3 to 8)
- DikMik – audio generator (tracks 1 to 6)
- Del Dettmar – synthesizer, keyboards (tracks 3 to 7)
- Simon House – synthesizer, violin, keyboards (tracks 7 and 8)

== Charts ==
Chart (1976)	Peak position
Australian Albums (Kent Music Report)	91
UK Albums (Official Charts)	34

Chart (2020)	Peak position
Scottish Albums (Official Charts)	39
UK Independent Albums (Official Charts)	11

== Certifications ==
Region	Certification	Certified units/sales
United Kingdom (BPI)	Silver	60,000^{^}
^{^} Shipments figures based on certification alone.

== Release history ==
- 1976: United Artists, UAK29919
- 1979: United Artists (EMI-ELECTROLA) 1C 038-82 624
- 1984: EMI Fame, FA413096-1
- 2020: Atomhenge Reissue, 1st CD pressing QATOMCD1045, Vinyl QATOMLP1045
