= In Search of Space =

Studio album by Hawkwind
- Released: 8 October 1971
- Recorded: 1971
- Studio: Olympic Studios
- Genres: Space rock; hard rock; psychedelic rock; progressive rock; proto-punk
- Length: 42:22
- Labels: United Artists (most of the world); Liberty (Japan & South Africa)
- Producers: George Chkiantz and Hawkwind

Hawkwind chronology
Hawkwind (1970)	In Search of Space (1971)	Doremi Fasol Latido (1972)

In Search of Space (also known as X in Search of Space or Xin Search of Space) is the second studio album from Hawkwind, released in 1971. It reached No. 18 on the UK Albums Chart.

== Background ==
Bass player John A Harrison left just after recording the first album, replaced by Thomas Crimble who in turn was replaced by Dave Anderson from Amon Düül II for this album, and who in turn would be gone before its release. Electronics player Dik Mik Davies had also temporarily left so the band's live sound engineer Del Dettmar was pulled in as a replacement, whilst Huw Lloyd-Langton had departed after a bad LSD experience at the Isle of Wight Festival.

== Songs ==
"You Shouldn't Do That" is an extended piece they had been playing live from Crimble's time in the band and he asserts he should have received a writer's credit for the central bass line on which this is based. It was recorded for a BBC Maida Vale session on 19 May 1971 for the Sounds of the 70s show, a bootleg version of the session can be found on The Text of Festival. It was the encore for the Space Ritual show but omitted from that album, later appearing in 1976 on the compilation album Roadhawks. It has been part of the live set at various times throughout their career, versions of which can be found on The Business Trip (1994) and Spaced Out in London (2004).

"You Know You're Only Dreaming" uses the riff and feel from Steve Miller Band's "Jackson-Kent Blues" from Number 5, an artist Brock has acknowledged being influenced by. This too was recorded for the BBC Sounds of the Seventies session and has appeared in the live set at various times throughout their career, including The 1999 Party (1974) and The Business Trip (1994).

Hawkwind – "Master of the Universe"
30 seconds of 6.17

"Master of the Universe" was written by Brock and Turner (who sings the lead vocal), although Anderson contends he should also have received a writer's credit for writing the main riff. It is the only track on the album that could be interpreted as lyrically having a space theme, but may also be viewed as being anthropocentric. This was also part of the Sounds of the Seventies session and quickly became a live favourite and almost ever present in the set, appearing on numerous live albums. The track was used by the Ford Motor company to advertise the Ford B-Max on television in 2012.

"We Took the Wrong Step Years Ago" is a twelve string guitar number with a band jam in the middle section and its lyrics bemoan the direction of society. A new acoustic version of "We Took The Wrong Step Years Ago" was included on The Road to Utopia (2018), produced and arranged by Mike Batt with additional orchestrations.

"Adjust Me" is a band improvisation.

"Children of the Sun" is an acoustic guitar number, although after the vocal passage the repeated heavy riff is augmented by electric guitars and bass.

The bonus track "Seven by Seven", originally the b-side to "Silver Machine", uses the riff from late 1960s English psychedelic band Leviathan's "Flames". The lyrics concern the seven rays.

== Recording ==
The band originally started to record the album at George Martin's AIR Studios, but after a week with little to show for their effort, and the studio engineers reported to be reluctant to work with the band after friends of the band broke "into George Martin's drinks cabinet, pinched all his booze and spiked the engineers with acid", the record company moved them to Olympic Studios to work with George Chkiantz to finish the recording quickly.

== Sleeve ==
The band had started working with a wider range of artists, a number of whom were contributing to the underground press. Graphic artist Barney Bubbles titled the album and designed the cover and with space-age poet Robert Calvert produced the accompanying 24-page The Hawkwind Log with photos by Phil Franks.

The front cover is a die-cut interlocking foldout. The back cover has a shot of a naked Stacia on stage under strobe lights and the phrase "TECHNICIÄNS ÖF SPÅCE SHIP EÅRTH THIS IS YÖÜR CÄPTÅIN SPEÄKING YÖÜR ØÅPTÅIN IS DEA̋D" which some people assert is a demonstration of the heavy metal umlaut. The inside panel features individual portraits of the band, however as Dik Mik had left the band his portrait was not taken, so on rejoining just before the album's release a hastily added image was included. Inside the foldout sleeve are various pictures of Hawkwind and the Pink Fairies playing together underneath the Westway in London.

There is no overall concept or theme to the songs on the album; the ideas that would culminate in the Space Ritual show are merely contained within the album package, principally The Hawkwind Log. It opens with:

The spacecraft Hawkwind was found by Captain RN Calvert of the Société Astronomæ (an international guild of creative artists dedicated in eternity to the discovery and demonstration of extra-terrestrial intelligence) on 8 July 1971 in the vicinity of Mare Librium near the South Pole. The discovery of the Hawkwind has led to more wild speculation than any of the mysteries of space that we have so far encountered. The facts surrounding the discovery of this drifting two-dimensional spaceship have been so distorted by guesswork and rumour that any further attempts at assessment would only increase the density of the fog.

Within, the journal entries are from various times and places, including a return to a burnt out Earth in November 1987. Themes explored include astrology and astronomy, ecology, science, occultism and mysticism, religion and philosophy. Some pieces would later be reused, such as the entries "0207 hrs 15 April 1572, Praesepe cluster" and "Countdown to Lift Off" which appeared on Space Ritual as "The Awakening" and "Ten Seconds of Forever" respectively, and Black Elk's "Offering of the Pipe" Hetchetu Aloh chant was later used on "Black Elk Speaks" from Space Bandits. One of the last entries, 1027 hrs. 5 May 1971, Ladbroke Grove, explains:

Space/time supply indicators near to zero. Our thoughts are losing depth, soon they will fold into each other, into flatness, into nothing but surface. Our ship will fold like a cardboard file and the noises of our minds compress into a disc of shining black, spinning in eternity...

== Critical reaction ==
Professional ratings
Review scores
Source	Rating
AllMusic	3.5/5 stars
The Encyclopedia of Popular Music	4/5 stars
Head Heritage	(positive)
Mojo	4/5 stars

Melody Maker reviewed the album in the context of contemporary German acts, feeling that "their instrumental playing" did not reach the same heights but that "they yield precedence to no-one in their creative use of electronics." Beat Instrumental assessed the album as "excellent", saying that the "music alternates between spaced out imagery and hard rock" as well as commenting that this is the start of the space trip leading to the "Space Opera".

In the US, Lester Bangs in Rolling Stone favourably appraised the album in the context of other musical works concerned with space, going on to describe the music as "monotone jammings with hypnotic rhythms and solos unravelling off into... well, space. The synthesizers warble, woof and scream and gurgle like barfing computers, the drums pound, and the singers chant Unknown Tongue rebops." Billboard described the music as "forcefully compelling, electronic and repetitive" and the band "nearly brings to fruition its claim of being a truly 'mind-expanding' rock group."

In April 2006 it made No. 83 in Classic Rock's "The 100 Greatest British Rock Albums", noting that "drummer Terry Ollis and bassist Dave Anderson could hit an awesome groove, allowing the rest of the band to cut loose on their acid-fuelled sonic adventures without fear of losing themselves or their listeners." In the same issue, Porcupine Tree's Steven Wilson placed it at No. 2 in his top 5, adding "it's an extraordinary whirlpool of cosmic sound, the definitive space-rock statement. I love the album's repetitive, almost pagan feel. It dispensed with the idea of soloists and has a real sense of 'otherness'."

== Track listing ==
Side one
No.	Title	Writer(s)	Length
1.	"You Shouldn't Do That"	Nik Turner, Dave Brock	15:41
2.	"You Know You're Only Dreaming"	Brock	6:36

Side two
No.	Title	Writer(s)	Length
3.	"Master of the Universe"	Turner, Brock	6:17
4.	"We Took the Wrong Step Years Ago"	Brock	4:48
5.	"Adjust Me"	Hawkwind (Note: There are conflicting songwriting credits for this track. The album cover credits simply "Hawkwind", while the album label credits Del Dettmar, and BMI records (see BMI Work #7523) credits Dave Brock, Del Dettmar, Dik Mik, and Nik Turner.)	5:46
6.	"Children of the Sun"	Turner, Dave Anderson	3:14
Total length:			42:22

1996 remastered CD bonus tracks
No.	Title	Writer(s)	Length
7.	"Seven By Seven" (original single version)	Brock	5:21
8.	"Silver Machine" (original single version)	Robert Calvert, Brock	4:39
9.	"Born to Go" (live single version edit; live at the Roundhouse)	Calvert, Brock	5:05
Total length:			57:27

== Personnel ==
Hawkwind

- Dave Brock – vocals, electric guitar, 6- and 12-string acoustic guitars, harmonica, audio generator
- Nik Turner – alto saxophone, flute, vocals, audio generator
- Del Dettmar – synthesizer
- Dik Mik (Michael Davies) – audio generator
- Dave Anderson – bass guitar, electric and acoustic guitars (original album)
- Terry Ollis – drums, percussion (original album)

Musicians on 1996 Remasters CD bonus tracks

- Robert Calvert – vocals
- Lemmy (Ian Kilmister) – bass guitar, vocals on "Silver Machine"
- Simon King – drums

=== Production ===
- Produced By Hawkwind & George Chkiantz
- Recorded & Engineered By George Chkiantz at AIR, The Roundhouse, Morgan & Rockfield Studios.
- Sleeve and The Hawkwind Log by Barney Bubbles (art), Bob Calvert (words) and Phil Franks (photography).

== Charts ==
Chart (1971–1972)	Peak position
Australian Albums (Kent Music Report)	34
UK Albums (Official Charts)	18

== Certifications ==
Region	Certification	Certified units/sales
United Kingdom (BPI) 1981 release	Gold	100,000^{^}
^{^} Shipments figures based on certification alone.

== Release history ==
- October-1971: United Artists Records, UAG29202, UK vinyl – came in fold out sleeve and 24-page The Hawkwind Log
- January-1981: Liberty LBG29202, UK vinyl
- October-1987: EMI Fame, FA3192, UK vinyl
- May-1989: EMI Fame, CDFA3192, UK CD
- July-1991: One Way Records, CDLL57474, USA CD (mistitled In Search of Space)
- March-1996: EMI Remasters, HAWKS2, UK CD – initial copies came in digipak with a fold out sleeve and 24-page The Hawkwind Log
- March-2003: EMI Records, 3823682, UK 2CD – with Doremi Fasol Latido
- 11 October 2010: Rock Classics (mistitled In Search of Space), UK, 2x12" vinyl 1000 copies
