= Bring Me the Head of Yuri Gagarin =

Live album by Hawkwind
- Released: January 1985
- Recorded: Empire Pool, Wembley, 27 May 1973
- Genre: Space rock
- Length: 37:42
- Label: Demi Monde

Hawkwind chronology
This Is Hawkwind, Do Not Panic (1984)	Bring Me the Head of Yuri Gagarin (1985)	Space Ritual Volume 2 (1985)

Professional ratings
Review scores
Source	Rating
Allmusic	2/5 stars
The Encyclopedia of Popular Music	1/5 stars
Kerrang!	2/5 stars

Bring Me the Head of Yuri Gagarin is a live album by English rock group Hawkwind released in 1985 consisting of a performance at the Empire Pool, Wembley on 27 May 1973. This is a poor sound quality audience recording licensed by Nik Turner. The recording has been released numerous times under different names, with different covers and bundled into box sets.

In 2006, the whole set from the band's performance was issued under the title Empire Pool Wembley 1973, although claimed to be from a different recording source, this also suffers from poor sound quality.

The title is a reference to the 1974 Sam Peckinpah film Bring Me the Head of Alfredo Garcia, as well as Yuri Gagarin, the first human to journey into outer space.

== Track listings ==
Side one

1. "Gaga" (Dunkley) – 2:10
2. "In the Egg" (Günter Grass) – 2:38
3. "Orgone Accumulator" (Calvert/Brock) – 7:25
4. "Wage War" (Jerzy Kosiński) – 2:49
5. "Urban Guerilla" (Calvert/Brock) – 6:01

Side two

1. "Master of the Universe" (Turner/Brock) – 6:53
2. "Welcome to the Future" (Calvert) – 2:38
3. "Sonic Attack" (Moorcock) – 3:26
4. "Silver Machine" (Calvert/Brock) – 3:42

Empire Pool Wembley 1973

1. "Intro - Andy Dunkley"
2. "In the Egg"
3. "Born to Go"
4. "Down Through the Night"
5. "Wage War"
6. "Urban Guerilla"
7. "Space Is Deep"
8. "Black Corridor"
9. "Orgone Accumulator"
10. "Upside Down"
11. "Brainstorm"
12. "Seven by Seven"
13. "Master of the Universe"
14. "Welcome to the Future"
15. "Sonic Attack"
16. "Silver Machine"

== Personnel ==
- Robert Calvert – vocals
- Dave Brock – electric guitar, vocals
- Nik Turner – saxophone, flute, vocals
- Lemmy – bass guitar, vocals
- Dik Mik Davies – synthesizer
- Del Dettmar – synthesizer
- Simon King – drums
- Andy Dunkley – introductions
- Cover by Nazer Ali Khan

== Release history ==
Date	Title	Format	Region	Label, Catalogue	Note
Jan/1985	Bring Me The Head of Yuri Gagarin	12"vinyl	UK	Demi Monde, DM002	
Nov/1986	Bring Me The Head of Yuri Gagarin	CD	UK, France	Decal, CDCHARLY40	
Jan/1993	Bring Me The Head of Yuri Gagarin	CD	UK, USA, Germany	Thunderbolt, CDTB101	
Mar/1996	Bring Me The Head of Yuri Gagarin	CD	USA	Magnum America, MACD040	
1996	Bring Me The Head of Yuri Gagarin	CD digipak	France	Spalax Music, SPALAXCD14846	
Feb/1998	Welcome to the Future	CD2 of 4	UK	Dressed to Kill, CLP0220-2	CD1: Masters of the Universe; CD3: Space Ritual Volume 2; CD4: The Text of Festival
Mar/1999	The Entire and Infinite Universe of Hawkwind	CD2 of 4	UK	Dressed to Kill, REDTK98	re-package of Welcome to the Future
2000	Bring Me the Head of Yuri Gagarin - Live at the Empire Pool 1976	CD1 of 2	Germany	Falcon	CD2: Masters of the Universe
Mar/2000	Live	CD	UK	Brilliant, BT33032	
Sep/2000	Year 2000: Codename Hawkwind Volume 2: Alive From The Darkside	CD	UK	New Millennium Communications, PILOT 64	contains a 31-second 3D QuickTime movie of the cover artwork.
Mar/2001	Silver Machine - Live!	CD	UK	Planet, PML 1075	
Jul/2001	The Legends Collection: The Hawkwind Collection	CD1 of 2	UK	Dressed to Kill, TOPAK515	CD2 is Space Ritual Volume 2
Jan/2002	Bring Me The Head of Yuri Gagarin	CD	UK	Charly/Snapper Records, SNAP050CD	
Oct/2002	Cosmic Overdrive	CD3 of 3	UK	New Millennium Communications, PILOT 146	CD1: Space Ritual Volume 2; CD3: Masters of the Universe
Mar/2006	Urban Guerilla	CD	UK	Brook Records, BROOK 1036	
Apr/2006	Empire Pool Wembley 1973	CD	UK	At Discs Records, AT75327CD	Full concert, different recording source
Dec/2006	Les Genies Du Rock	CD	France		
Apr/2008	Bring Me The Head of Yuri Gagarin	CD	UK	Plastic Head Records, PHRL003CD	bonus track: Yuri Gagarin speaking
