= Lord of Light (disambiguation) =

Lord of Light is a science fantasy novel by Roger Zelazny (1967).

Lord of Light may also refer to:

- "Lord of Light", a song by Hawkwind on their album Doremi Fasol Latido (1972)
- "Lord of Light", a song by Iron Maiden on their album A Matter of Life and Death (2006)
- R'hllor, also known as the Lord of Light, a god in the A Song of Ice and Fire fantasy series (1996–)
- Lord of Light (comics), a Marvel Comics character first appearing in 1987

== See also ==
- "Lords of Light!", a catchphrase from the animated series Thundarr the Barbarian
