= Glastonbury Fayre (album) =

Compilation album by Various artists
- Released: April 1972
- Genre: Rock
- Label: Revelation 1/2/3

Professional ratings
Review scores
Source	Rating
Allmusic	4.5/5 stars

Glastonbury Fayre is a triple album released in 1972, comprising performances by acts who had appeared at the Glastonbury Festival in 1971 (see Festival line-up 1971) and others. The album came in a fold-out poster sleeve inside a printed PVC outer sleeve, with a 32-page illustrated booklet, a poster sheet and a fold-out Silver Pyramid, all designed by Barney Bubbles.

Although most of the performances are live, not all were recorded at the Festival. The track contributed by Grateful Dead is a version of "Dark Star" (titled "Dark Star....bury" for this compilation) recorded at the Empire Pool, Wembley, London, on 8 April 1972 (during the band's Europe '72 tour). The group was widely rumoured to be due to appear at the Festival but did not. Studio demo recordings were contributed by Marc Bolan and Pete Townshend, who did not appear at the event, and by David Bowie, who did.

There are some variations in the production of the record set; there are differences in the colours printed on the labels. Copies with lighter green labels with white and red Revelation logo and black lettering represent the first pressing, whilst those with dark green labels with yellow and red Revelation logo and yellow lettering represent the second pressing. The inside of the sleeve of the second pressing stated what Revelation Productions had done with the monies collected from the first pressing. The second pressing did not sell as well as the first and is much harder to find.

== Track listing ==
Side A

1. Grateful Dead: "Dark Star....bury" – 24:12 (Note: Extended versions of this performance were later released on Steppin' Out with the Grateful Dead: England '72 and Europe '72: The Complete Recordings as "Dark Star".)

Side B

1. Brinsley Schwarz: "Love Song" – 4:10
2. Mighty Baby: "A Blanket In My Muesli" – 16:00

Side C

1. Marc Bolan: "Sunken Rags" – 2:29
2. Pete Townshend: "Classified" – 3:53
3. David Bowie: '"Supermen" – 2:44
4. Hawkwind: "Silver Machine and Welcome to the Future medley" (recorded at The Roundhouse, London on 13 February 1972 ) – 7:27
5. Skin Alley: "Sun Music" – 4:50

Side D

1. Daevid Allen and Gong: "Glad Stoned Buried Fielding Flash And Fresh Fest Footprint In My Memory" – 23:10

Side E

1. Pink Fairies: "Do It" – 4:09
2. Pink Fairies: "Uncle Harry's Last Freak-Out" – 19:47

Side F

1. Edgar Broughton Band: "Out Demons Out" – 20:24
