= Hurry On Sundown =

1970 single by Hawkwind

Single by Hawkwind

from the album Hawkwind
- B-side: "Mirror of Illusion"
- Released: 26 June 1970
- Recorded: March 1970 at Trident Studios
- Genre: Blues rock, psychedelic rock
- Length: 4:50
- Label: Liberty
- Songwriter(s): Dave Brock
- Producer(s): Dick Taylor

Hawkwind singles chronology
"Hurry On Sundown" (1970)	"Silver Machine" (1972)

Hawkwind Zoo EP

EP by Hawkwind
- Released: 1 May 1981
- Recorded: Abbey Road Studios, 1969; Olympic Studios, January 1975
- Label: Flicknife
- Producer: Don Paul

Hawkwind EPs chronology
Hawkwind Zoo EP (1981)	Sonic Assassins EP (1981)

"Hurry On Sundown" is a 1970 song by the UK rock group Hawkwind. It was the band's first record release, issued as a single in the UK on 26 June 1970, being an edit of the version that appeared two months later on the debut album Hawkwind. The song is inspired by Leroy Carr and Scrapper Blackwell's version of "Hurry Down Sunshine (See What Tomorrow Brings)", (Note: SCRAPPER BLACKWELL, LEROY CARR, JELLY ROLL MORTON – I like a lot of the old blues things – I used to have a huge collection of New Orleans stuff especially. Morton in particular was incredible... some of his chords were incredible. He was quite a revolutionary for his time. I had to sell my whole blues collection at a time when I was hard up. I’d like to get some of those records back.) written by Mary Fix and Will Shade, (Note: Fix, credited as Sister Morgan, not to be confused with Sister Gertrude Morgan, recorded the song for Victor Records with Shade on 25 February 1927 at rooms 405 and 411, McCall Building, Memphis, Tennessee, supervised by Ralph Peer. The recording was eventually issued in 1995 on Too Late Too Late Volume 5 1927 – 1964 (Document Records, DOCD-5411). It appears to be her only known extant recording.) originally recorded in 1934 and issued on the album Blues Before Sunrise (Columbia, BPG 62206, 1962).

The song is a defining and distinctive piece from the group's canon, appearing on the first collection album Roadhawks in 1976, and included on most official compilations covering the era. After the first album, the band ceased performing the number live until very rare appearances from 2000 onwards. It has been covered by a handful of artists including Kula Shaker, Vetiver, Moon Duo and Psychic TV.

== Other versions ==
=== Hawkwind Zoo EP ===
Towards the end of 1969, still using the name Hawkwind Zoo and with Mick Slattery as the lead guitarist, the band were given studio time by Don Paul to record some demos. Paul had known Brock from working with him earlier in the year on The Buskers album (Columbia, SX6356), British tour and Royal Albert Hall concert. "Hurry On Sundown" was one of the tracks recorded, this version being more electric and psychedelic than the acoustic folky feel of the later debut album version.

The recording was eventually released in 1981 as the first of a host of archive material issued through Flicknife Records. Another previously unheard track recorded at the same session, "Sweet Mistress of Pain" (also known as "Kiss of the Velvet Whip"), was included on the B-side, as was an alternate version of the 1975 single "Kings of Speed".

The two Hawkwind Zoo demos were eventually included on the remasters version of the Hawkwind debut album, (Note: "Hurry on Sundown" is edited down from seven minutes to five, removing 90 seconds from the mid-section (the guitar and drums interplay) and 30 seconds from the end section) with a third, a cover of Pink Floyd's "Cymbaline".

=== Radio Session ===
The band recorded a version at Maida Vale Studios on 18 August 1970 for broadcast on John Peel's BBC Radio programme Top Gear on 19 September 1970, along with "Some of That Stuff" and "Seeing It As You Really Are". Poor quality off-air recordings of this session were first released, without the BBC's permission, on The Text of Festival in 1983, then on various subsequent compilations. No official clean version of these tracks have ever been released.

=== Live ===
As the band pursued a more experimental electronic and rock direction, the acoustic folk of the song did not sit well in the set and was soon dropped, rarely to be performed. It has, in the band's latter years, been returned to the set for odd occasions, and live versions can be heard on the albums Yule Ritual (2001) and Hawkwind 50 Live (2020).

In 2021 they performed the song during their Hawkfest festival with guest violinist Athene Roberts of 3 Daft Monkeys fame.

=== Covers ===
- Magic Mushroom Band – RU Spaced Out 2 (1993)
- The Petals – Assassins of Silence / Hundred-Watt Violence (1995)
- Kula Shaker – "Sound of Drums" single (Hari Om Sundown) (1998)
- Sam Roberts Band – live Spokane, WA
- Marshan - Daze Öf The Undergröund (A Tribute Tö Hawkwind) (Godreah Record, FAFF03CD, 2003)
- Vetiver – Thing of the Past (2008)
- Moon Duo – In Search Of Hawkwind (Critical Mass Records, cM005, 2010)
- Psychic TV – Silver Sundown Machine Vs. Alien Lightning Meat Machine (Vanity Case Records, VC-14, 2012) 18 minute mash-up of "Silver Machine" and "Hurry On Sundown"

== Personnel ==
- Dave Brock - vocals, harmonica, 12-string acoustic guitar
- Mick Slattery - lead electric guitar (Hawkwind Zoo demo)
- Dick Taylor - lead acoustic guitar (album)
- Huw Lloyd-Langton - lead electric guitar (BBC Radio 1 Session)
- Nik Turner - percussion
- Dik Mik Davies - electronics
- John Harrison - bass guitar (Hawkwind Zoo demo, album)
- Thomas Crimble - bass guitar (BBC Radio 1 Session)
- Terry Ollis - drums
