= Life in Space =

Studio album by Nik Turner
- Released: 29 September 2017
- Genre: space rock, jazz fusion
- Label: Cleopatra Records

Nik Turner chronology
Space Fusion Odyssey (2015)	Life in Space (2017)

Life in Space is the follow-up solo album by Nik Turner to Space Fusion Odyssey. The album was released on Cleopatra Records in September 2017.

== Track listing ==
The album includes:-

1. End Of The World

2. Why Are You?

3. Back To Earth

4. Secrets Of The Galaxy

5. Universal Mind

6. Approaching The Unknown

7. As You Were

8. Master Of The Universe
