= Doremi Fasol Latido =

Studio album by Hawkwind
- Released: 24 November 1972
- Recorded: September–October 1972
- Studio: Rockfield Studios
- Genres: Space rock; hard rock; progressive rock; proto-punk
- Length: 41:37
- Labels: United Artists (most of the world); Liberty (Japan); One Way (1991 US reissue)
- Producers: Dave Brock & Del Dettmar

Hawkwind chronology
In Search of Space (1971)	Doremi Fasol Latido (1972)	Space Ritual (1973)

Doremi Fasol Latido is a 1972 album by English space rock band Hawkwind. Recorded at Rockfield Studios and released on United Artists Records, it was their third album since their debut, Hawkwind, in 1970. It reached No. 14 on the UK album charts.

== New members ==
The rhythm section of Dave Anderson and Terry Ollis was replaced by Lemmy and Simon King, both of whose style differed notably from their predecessors. This changed the band's overall musical direction. Lemmy was a self-confessed inept guitarist who used volume and stagecraft to cover his lack of ability. He became a bassist by accident after joining the band, thinking he was replacing Huw Lloyd-Langton. Lemmy said

I knew the guitarist because he took eight tabs of acid and then we never saw him for five years.

However, Dave Brock decided to play lead and continue without a second guitarist. Hawkwind's bass guitarist failed to turn up and Lemmy was available. He said:

I learned to play bass onstage with Hawkwind… I go out onstage with this bass around my neck, and it was a Rickenbacker, too. The bass player, like an idiot, left his bass in the truck. So I'm learning. Nik Turner says to make some noises in E. "This one's called You Shouldn't Do That." Then he walks away.

This led to Lemmy's very unorthodox technique. Lemmy stated:

I just don't play like a bass player. There are complaints about me from time to time. It's not like having a bass player; it's like having a deep guitarist.

King's drumming was more square-beat and "rock" than the jazzier free-flowing Ollis.

== Sound and production ==
Rockfield Studios was in its infancy and the environment at the time was spartan, Lemmy explaining that they "recorded it at the barn, before they modernised it, with mattresses on the walls and things." Some band members have expressed concerns with the quality of the production, Simon King feeling that "It sounded as if all the bass was turned off, your amp wasn't working properly and your stereo was bunged up all at the same time." and Lemmy adding "It was just not very well recorded. It was all thin and tinny."

Dave Brock explained their method of working as "we recorded bass, guitar, drums and vocals together, so it's as live as it can be, and then we put on the other things afterwards... We just let the tapes run and play like we do when we're playing live; do a three-hour track and then cut it up into pieces, use one piece as a complete section, and join it up to another piece with a synthesiser link or something... It's improvised, but it's together in the first place."

== Songs ==
Hawkwind – "Brainstorm"
30 seconds of 11:32

"Brainstorm" is Turner's first solo composition for the band, and features an extended middle section that would be reworked throughout the years (including Ginger Baker's drum solo in 1980). Before its appearance on this album, it was recorded on 2 August 1972 at the BBC's Maida Vale studio for broadcast on the Johnnie Walker show along with "Silver Machine", followed by an appearance on the In Concert hour-long BBC broadcast from the Paris Cinema on 28 September 1972. It has almost remained an ever-present in the live set with numerous live versions being released, and was covered by Monster Magnet on their 1993 album Superjudge.

"Space Is Deep" lyrics are derived from Michael Moorcock's "The Black Corridor" poem. The first vocal part is an acoustic piece played by both Brock (on 12-string) and Lemmy with layered electronic effects, the second instrumental part being the full band in an electric workout, finally returning to an acoustic coda. It was dropped from the live set during 1973 as the band moved away from the Space Ritual show, only briefly being resurrected for some reunion shows during 2000, a version of which can be heard on the Yule Ritual album.

"One Change" is a brief sedate instrumental featuring a heavily echoed keyboard contribution from Del Dettmar.

An edited version of "Lord of Light" (see Roger Zelazny's Lord of Light) was released as a single in Germany (UA35492, June 1973) backed by an edited version of "Born to Go" from the Greasy Truckers Party album. It was dropped from the live set in the mid-1970s, but reinstated for the 1995 "Alien 4" tour, a version being released as the B-side to the 1997 single "Love in Space".

"Down Through the Night" is another Brock acoustic number with layered electronics, flute and reverse echoed vocals. For the Space Ritual set it featured the full electric band.

"Time We Left (This World Today)" is a song in four movements, the first being a chanted Call and response bemoaning the direction society was heading in the same vein Brock was exploring with "We Took the Wrong Step Years Ago" and "Psychedelic Warlords". The second movement is an instrumental dissonance passage leading into the third movement featuring a powerful bass guitar and lead guitar interchange, eventually returning to the first movement. It appeared in the Space Ritual set with "Paranoia" replacing the middle section, and also made an appearance during 1989–91 with "Heads" as the middle section, as can be heard on Palace Springs.

"The Watcher" is Lemmy's first composition for Hawkwind, this being a spacious acoustic number with fuzz-bass. The lyrics were written from the perspective of someone from afar (perhaps God or an alien master race) watching the inhabitants of Earth destroy themselves through their own greed. This is the only song from the album that wasn't featured in the Space Ritual set, but it did briefly make an appearance during 1973 and 1974 as can be heard on The 1999 Party, slightly re-arranged as a more uptempo band performance. Lemmy re-recorded the song with Motörhead on their eponymous 1977 debut album.

New acoustic versions of "Down Through The Night" and "The Watcher" were included on The Road to Utopia (2018), produced and arranged by Mike Batt with additional orchestrations, and a guest appearance by Eric Clapton on "The Watcher".

== Title, sleeve and philosophy ==
The package was put together and titled by graphic artist Barney Bubbles and is a continuation on themes he introduced with In Search of Space carried through and culminating in the Space Ritual. The title refers to the assignment of syllables to steps of the diatonic scale (Do-Re-Mi, etc.). It alludes to the music of the spheres which Bubbles expounds upon:

The basic principle for the starship and the space ritual is based on the Pythagorean concept of sound. Briefly, this conceived the Universe to be an immense monochord, with its single string stretched between absolute spirit and at its lowest end – absolute matter. Along this string were positioned the planets of our solar system. Each of these spheres as it rushed through space was believed to sound a certain tone caused by its continuous displacement of the ether. These intervals and harmonies are called 'The Sound Of The Spheres.' The interval between Earth and the fixed stars being the most perfect harmonic interval.

- Do – Mars – red
- Re – Sun – orange
- Mi – Mercury – yellow
- Fa – Saturn – green
- Sol – Jupiter – blue
- La – Venus – Indigo
- Ti – Moon – violet

The original cover came in a silver foil sleeve with black print, the front depicting a shield which became an ident for the band, being used on many other album and single covers. The rear cover, inner sleeve and poster depict barbarian-type warriors in futuristic settings. The back cover includes in the legend:

The Saga of Doremi Fasol Latido is a collection of ritualistic space chants, battle hymns and stellar songs of praise as used by the family clan of Hawkwind on their epic journey to the fabled land of Thorasin.

The legend tells of the Hawklords last and defeated stand against the "tyranny of the corrupt forces for law and evil", but the inner sleeve has redemption in the legend:

And in the fullness of time, the prophecy must be fulfilled and the Hawklords shall return to smite the land. And the dark forces shall be scourged, the cities razed and made into parks. Peace shall come to everyone. For is it not written that the sword is key to Heaven and Hell?

== Critical reaction ==
Professional ratings
Review scores
Source	Rating
Allmusic	3/5 stars
The Encyclopedia of Popular Music	2/5 stars

The UK music press warmly received the album, Nick Kent in NME confessing "I'd be ashamed to say I didn't love it" describing the music as one chord short of "the strongest high energy cosmic hubcap this side of the Metal Zone". Andrew Means of Melody Maker commented that "It's not melody and it's not harmony, and it's not really rhythm... it is ambiguity. It is the spaced out slipstream, the rushing, gurgling torrent of weightless sound that first turns the circle of mental pictures, associations and impressions picked out from space, time and earth... The listener is as much a traveller as the musician." Sounds' Martin Hayman meanwhile described the music as "the bass and drums batter on with unflagging pace, synthesisers swirl and whistle around the thunderous block riffs whose endless repetition generates that numbed hypnosis, tuneless and menacing voices incant largely incomprehensible lyrics. This is not to knock Hawkwind: the sound they are getting is thicker, fuller, more convincing than ever before. Its total effect is pretty devastating, but the means by which the effect is achieved is no revolution in sound."

== Track listing ==
Side one
No.	Title	Writer(s)	Length
1.	"Brainstorm"	Nik Turner	11:33
2.	"Space Is Deep"	Dave Brock	6:22
3.	"One Change"	Del Dettmar	0:49

Side two
No.	Title	Writer(s)	Length
4.	"Lord of Light"	Brock	6:59
5.	"Down Through the Night"	Brock	3:04
6.	"Time We Left This World Today"	Brock	8:43
7.	"The Watcher"	Ian Kilmister	4:00
Total length:			41:37

Remastered CD bonus tracks
No.	Title	Writer(s)	Length
8.	"Urban Guerrilla"	Robert Calvert, Brock	3:41
9.	"Brainbox Pollution"	Brock	5:42
10.	"Lord of Light" (single version edit)	Brock	3:59
11.	"Ejection"	Calvert	3:47

== Personnel ==
Hawkwind

- Dave Brock – 6- and 12-string acoustic guitar, electric guitar, vocals, production
- Nik Turner – saxophone, flute, vocals
- Lemmy (Ian Kilmister) – bass guitar, acoustic guitar, vocals
- Dik Mik (Michael Davies) – audio generator, electronics
- Del Dettmar – synthesizer, production
- Simon King – drums

Additional musicians

- Robert Calvert – vocals on "Urban Guerrilla" and "Ejection"
- Paul Rudolph – guitars on "Ejection"

== Production ==
- Recorded at Rockfield, Wales, September and October. Produced by Brock and Dettmar
- Sleeve designed by Barney Bubbles
- "Urban Guerrilla" and "Brainbox Pollution" recorded at Olympic Studios, 1973

== Charts ==
Chart (1972–1973)	Peak position
UK Albums (Official Charts)	14

Chart (2024)	Peak position
Scottish Albums (Official Charts)	23

== Release history ==
- November 1972: United Artists Records, UAG29364, UK vinyl – original issues came in black on silver foil single sleeve, with inner sleeve and foldout Star Rats poster. Subsequent issues were a simple single sleeve.
- January 1981: Liberty Records, UAG29364, UK vinyl
- August 1986: Liberty Records, ATAK92, UK vinyl
- July 1991: One Way Records, CDLL 57475, USA CD
- March 1996: EMI Remaster, HAWKS3, UK CD – initial copies came in digipak
- March 2003: EMI Records, 3823682, UK 2CD – with In Search of Space
- 11 October 2010: Rock Classics, UK, 2x12" grey vinyl, 1000 copies
- 8 November 2024: Cherry Red, QATOMLP1056, UK LP with 7" single
- 8 November 2024: Cherry Red, QATOMCD21056, UK 2CD Remastered expanded edition
- 8 November 2024: Cherry Red, QATOMCD51056, UK 3CD/2 Blu-Ray Deluxe Box Set edition (bundled with Greasy Truckers concert)
- 8 November 2024: Rough Trade, QATOMLP1056RT, UK LP on clear and black splash vinyl, with 7" single
