= Stacia =

Irish dancer with the band Hawkwind

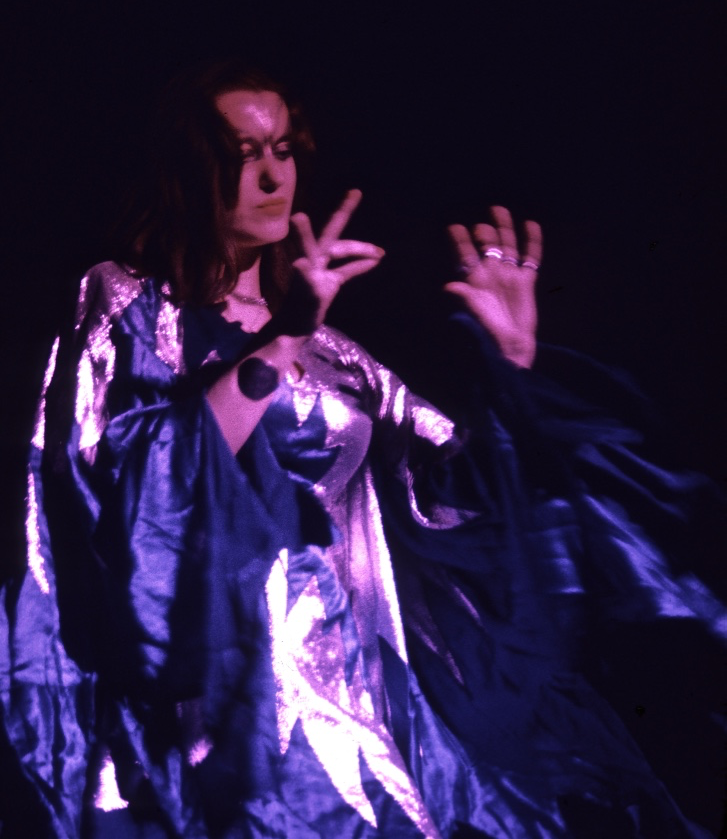
- Stacia in 1974
- Born: Stacia Blake; 1952–1953; Exeter, Devon, England
- Occupations: Visual artist, performance artist/dancer
- Years active: 1969–present
- Spouse: Roy Dyke

Stacia Blake, known mononymously as Stacia, is a former English performance artist/dancer with the rock band Hawkwind.

== Early years ==
Stacia was born and raised in Exeter, Devon, England to an English Protestant father and an Irish Catholic mother.

== With Hawkwind ==
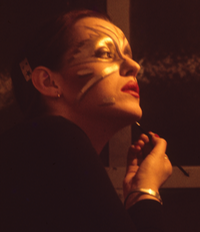
Stacia applies makeup in preparation for Hall of the Mountain Grill Hawkwind tour date

Stacia joined Hawkwind in 1971; however accounts vary as to how and why she began working with the band. Liner notes to In Search of Space indicate that frontman and lyricist Robert Calvert recruited her for live shows. In 2012, Nik Turner, Hawkwind's saxophonist and flautist told Mojo, "I met Stacia for the first time at the Isle of Wight... She said, "Can I dance with you?" and I said, "Yeah, but you must take off all your clothes and paint your body." She took all her clothes off but unfortunately I didn't have any body paint. That was like her audition." In a 1972 interview in British music magazine Melody Maker, Stacia herself stated that she attended a show and, inspired by the music, got on stage and performed an impromptu dance to the band's music. However, in a 2019 interview in Prog, she said her first time appearing with the band, at the Flamingo Ballroom in 1971, happened after she asked the band members if she could dance on stage. She immediately became an integral part of the live show after joining in 1971.

According to a 1974 interview in Penthouse, Stacia was six feet (183 cm) tall and "happily bisexual". She regularly augmented her visual impact by performing topless or nude, her body decorated in iridescent or luminescent paint. In a 2007 BBC Four documentary, Lemmy described her as 6 ft 2 inches (188 cm) tall with a 42 inch (132 cm) bust and a bookbinder by trade. The same documentary said that she was working as a petrol pump attendant in Cornwall when she joined the band.

Stacia regarded most of what she did with the band as interpretive dance, although there were some set routines. She was an integral part of the early to mid-1970s Hawkwind show, particularly during the Space Ritual era. She left Hawkwind in 1975 after touring in support of the Warrior on the Edge of Time album and implied in a 2019 interview that her departure was not her idea.

== After Hawkwind ==
After leaving Hawkwind, Stacia returned to private life and married Roy Dyke before moving to Germany with him where he formed Bauer, Garn & Dyke. She currently lives in Ireland and works as an artist.

Stacia appeared and performed with former Hawkwind member Nik Turner and contemporary dancer Ms. Angel at Kozfest in 2019. The unannounced performance was her first since she last appeared with Hawkwind at Reading Festival in August 1975.
