= Live at Deeply Vale =

Live At Deeply Vale

Live album by Nik Turner's Sphynx
- Released: 2000
- Recorded: 1978

Live At Deeply Vale is a live album recorded in 1978 by Nik Turner's Sphynx at the Deeply Vale Festival.

== Track listing ==
No.	Title	Length
1.	"The Awakening Pyramid Spell"	9:07
2.	"Hall of Double Truths"	8:03
3.	"Anubis"	13:53
4.	"Thoth"	15:16
5.	"God Rock"	12:31

== Personnel ==
- Nik Turner - sax, flute, vocals
- Karina Barrat - keyboards, vocals
- Hari Williamson - guitar, sarcofagus
- Baggins - bass
- Ermanno Ghizio Erba (aka Dino Ferrari) - drums
- Steffi Sharpstrings - guitar
