= Space Ritual (band) =

British rock band

Space Ritual were a British space rock band, formed in 2000 fronted by Nik Turner, and composed principally of former Hawkwind members. They played a mix of early Hawkwind material and their own compositions.

== History ==
The Hawkestra event took place on 21 October 2000 at the Brixton Academy which featured nearly all past members of Hawkwind, but disagreements between various participants led to any restaging of the event being unlikely. Chris Hewitt who had worked with Nik Turner back at Deeply Vale in the late 1970s put on two gigs in 2001 with Nik's chosen name "The Isle of Wight line up of Hawkwind". These two gigs were at Stairways in Birkenhead and The Empress Ballroom in Blackpool. Chris Hewitt then started to manage the band and put together The Greasy Truckers Party 2001 at The Astoria in London, featuring members of the Hawkestra on 21 October 2001 at the London Astoria, which, despite being invited, all of the then members of Hawkwind refused to be a part of.

Turner's band continued performing further gigs and eventually went by the name of xhawkwind.com. An appearance at Glastonbury in 2002 led to confusion as to whether this actually was Hawkwind, sufficiently irking Dave Brock into taking legal action to prohibit Turner from trading under the name XHawkwind, a case which Turner lost.

Turner then chose to name the band Space Ritual.net, after Hawkwind's 1973 live album The Space Ritual Alive, having previously used the name Space Ritual during the mid-1990s for a North America tour. The gigs in 2002 and 2003 were named Greasy Truckers Parties and featured SpaceRitual.net with many ex members of Hawkwind plus dancers, Striking Lighting's superb lightshow and many other artists, Inner City Unit, The Theory, Richard Kid Strange, Tractor, Guitar George Borowski giving the feel of a touring circus-type event.

== Members ==
=== Principal members ===
- Nik Turner – vocals, sax, flute (Hawkwind 1969–77, 1982–84)
- Mick Slattery – lead guitar, vocals (Hawkwind 1969–70)
- Thomas Crimble – keyboards, previously bass and rhythm guitar (Hawkwind 1970–71)
- Terry Ollis – drums, percussion (Hawkwind 1969–72)
- Chris Purdon (a.k.a. Chris Mekon) – synthesizers, FX
- Gary 'Slapper' Smart – bass guitar
- Miss Angel – Dancer

=== Affiliates ===
- Del Dettmar – electronics (Hawkwind 1971–74)
- Ron Tree – vocals (Hawkwind 1995–2001)
- Meurig Griffiths – drums

=== Former members and affiliates ===
- Dave Anderson – analogue synthesiser, bass (Hawkwind 1971)
- Jerry Richards – bass guitar (Hawkwind guitarist 1995–2001)
- Commander Jim Hawkman – keyboards
- John Greves – keyboards & synthesisers (1999–2006)
- Thomas Hewitt – guitar
- Jaki Windmill – Djembe, Vocals
- Debespace
- Lloyd George – a.k.a. Doktor Hotknife or 'the new Dik Mik' – Synths & Keyboards
- Sam Ollis – drums, DJ record decks

== Discography ==
=== Studio releases ===
Year	Title	Label	Cat #	Track listing	Personnel
2005	Sonic Savages	Space Ritual Records	SRR0002CD	Sonic Savages, Ritual of The Savage Earth, Jazzy Jam	Nik Turner, Mick Slattery, Thomas Crimble, Terry Ollis, Dave Anderson, John Greves, Sam Ollis
2007	Otherworld	Esoteric Recordings	ECLEC2011	The Return, Otherworld, Black Corridor, Bubbles, Communique II, Ritual Of The Ravaged Earth, ASDF, Sonic Savages, Droid Love, Time Crime, Arrival In Utopia, Atomik, The Riddle, Notes From A Cold Planet, Walking Backwards	Nik Turner; Dave Anderson; Terry Ollis; Del Dettmar; Mick Slattery; John Greves; Thomas Crimble (Plus guest credits for Sam Ollis, Jacki Windmill, Russ Russell, Chris Fielding and Jerry Richards)

=== Live recordings ===
Year	Title	Label	Cat #	Track listing	Personnel
2001	2001: A Space Rock Odyssey	Ozit-Morpheus	OZIT CD55	Sonic Attack, You Shouldn't Do That, Odyssey Improvisation, Dragon Rider, Space Ritual, Waiting for Tomorrow, Master of the Universe, Silver Machine, Spirit of the Age, Sonic Attack, Odyssey Improvisation, Space Ritual, Ten Seconds of Forever	Nik Turner, Huw Lloyd-Langton, Thomas Crimble, Terry Ollis, Lloyd George, John Greves, Commander Jim Hawkman, Thomas Hewitt
2002	Live At Glastonbury And Guildford Festival	Ozit-Morpheus	OZIT CD211	Orion Sunrise, The Awakening, Osiris, The Landing, Blue Train (Coltrane), Space Grab (Ollis, Crimble, Slattery, Turner), Thunder Rider Rap, Warp Out (Ollis, Crimble, Slattery, Turner), D Rider	Nik Turner, Mick Slattery, Thomas Crimble, Terry Ollis, Sam Ollis, John Greves, Commander Jim Hawkman, Thomas Hewitt, Jaki Windmill
2003	Greasy Truckers Party 2002–2003	Ozit-Morpheus	OZIT CD221	Brainstorm, Sonic Savages, Watching The Grass Grow, Children of the Sun (Also featuring tracks from Tractor, Richard Strange, Guitar George Borowski, and The Theory)	Nik Turner, Mick Slattery, Thomas Crimble, Terry Ollis, Dave Anderson, John Greves, Del Dettmar, Jaki Windmill
2005	Live At The Venusian Electric Ballroom In The Cygnus 5 Galaxy	Space Ritual Records	SRR0001CD	Cosmic Chant, Watching the Grass Grow, Born to Go, D Rider, Brainstorm, Ejection, Sonic Attack, Master of the Universe, Silver Machine	Nik Turner, Mick Slattery, Thomas Crimble, Terry Ollis, Dave Anderson, John Greves, Sam Ollis
2009	Otherworld Live 2007	Space Ritual Records	SRCD001	The Right Stuff, Steppenwolf, The Awakening, Sonic Savages, Walking Backwards, Otherworld, Ritual Of The Ravaged Earth, Time Crime, Bubbles, The Riddle, D-Rider, Master of the Universe, Brainstorm	Nik Turner, Mick Slattery, Thomas Crimble, Terry Ollis, Jerry Richards, Chris Purdon (Plus guest credits for Sam Ollis and Mark Powell)

=== Video releases ===
Year	Title	Label	Cat #	Track listing	Personnel
2006	Satiricon	ents.tv	ents.dvd.008	Launch, Cosmic Chant, Born To Go, Welcome To The Future, Watching The Grass Grow, Sonic Savages, D Rider, Time Crime, Children Of The Sun, Jazzy Jam, Brainstorm, Orgone Accumulator, Sonic Attack, Ejection, You Shouldn't Do That, Master Of The Universe, Silver Machine, Inspector Clouseau Theme	Nik Turner, Mick Slattery, Thomas Crimble, Terry Ollis, Dave Anderson, John Greves, Sam Ollis, Jaki Windmill, Debespace, The Fabulous Ms Angel
