= Hall of the Mountain Grill =

1974 studio album by Hawkwind

Studio album by Hawkwind
- Released: 6 September 1974
- Recorded: Edmonton Sundown (24 January 1974), Olympic Studios, London (May–June 1974)
- Genres: Space rock; progressive rock; psychedelic rock
- Length: 41:24
- Labels: United Artists (most of the world); Liberty (Japan)
- Producers: Roy Thomas Baker, Doug Bennett, Hawkwind

Hawkwind chronology
| Space Ritual (1973) | Hall of the Mountain Grill (1974) | Warrior on the Edge of Time (1975) |

Hall of the Mountain Grill is the fourth studio album by space rock band Hawkwind, released in 1974. It is regarded by many critics as a career highlight.

The group's fourth studio album, it was the first by a new line-up that included Simon House on synthesizer, Mellotron and electric violin; absent were Robert Calvert, who had previously contributed lyrics, vocals and spoken word interludes, and Dik Mik, who provided electronic effects.

== Title and cover art ==
The album's title was a nod to Edvard Grieg's "In the Hall of the Mountain King" and to a Portobello Road cafe called The Mountain Grill (now closed), frequented by the band and their contemporaries from the Ladbroke Grove scene in the early 1970s. Hawkwind's frequent solo support act and occasional live guest musician Steve Peregrin Took had a song "The Ballad of the Mountain Grill," released in 1995 on a Cleopatra Records CD under alternative title "Flophouse Blues (in the Mountain Grill)". At one point, underground newspaper International Times had its printworks in the upstairs of the Grill.

The cover of a derelict spaceship in the mists of an alien lagoon was painted by the band's regular artistic collaborator, Barney Bubbles. The rear cover was by David A. Hardy.

== Background and recording ==
The record featured hard rockers like "The Psychedelic Warlords (Disappear in Smoke)" and "Lost Johnny" (subsequently recorded by bassist Lemmy's post-Hawkwind band Motörhead and also by co-writer Mick Farren with his band The Deviants), psychedelia such as the heavily phased "D-Rider" and "Web Weaver", as well as quieter atmospheric numbers like the instrumentals "Goat Willow", "Wind of Change" and the title track. Side two of the original vinyl LP was bookended by "You'd Better Believe It" and "Paradox", live tracks recorded at the Edmonton Sundown in January 1974, which recalled the 'space jams' of earlier releases.

In the wake of Robert Calvert's departure, lead vocals for the album were performed by Dave Brock, along with Lemmy on "Lost Johnny" and Nik Turner on "D-Rider". The band's line-up would continue to shift during the year. Del Dettmar left prior to the release of Hall of the Mountain Grill to live in Canada, and Alan Powell joined as an additional drummer. Science fiction author and friend of the group Michael Moorcock stepped in to read poetry at their concerts.

Jonathan Smeeton (Liquid Len) has stated that Brock specifically wrote "Wind of Change" for a particular slide sequence he had on the Space Ritual tour (a tree being engulfed by a city, then the city collapsing with the tree remaining).

At the time of the album's release, Simon King stated "The Doremi album lacked production. I wasn't really happy with the Space Ritual either. But the new one – I'm quite pleased with it. I like side one because I think it's something we haven't done before. Yeah – I'm pleased with half of the new album." Lemmy later commented that "For me, this was when the band were at their height. Oh, and I was in the band at the time." (Classic Rock, April 2006), listing it as No. 3 in "My Top British Rock Albums".

After the release of the successful live album Space Ritual and single "Urban Guerrilla" in 1973, vocalist Robert Calvert and electronics player Dik Mik Davies left, leaving the group as a five-piece. In November and December 1973, Hawkwind undertook their first live tour of North America taking in ten dates. During this time, Del Dettmar bought land near Calgary in Canada and signalled to the group his intent that he and his pregnant wife were to emigrate.

The group continued touring heavily around Britain and Ireland from December into February under the banner "The Ridiculous Roadshow with the Silly Hawkwind Brothers". By this time, their live set had been revamped and contained what would become the bulk of this album. Two dates on 25 and 26 January at the Edmonton Sundown were used as an opportunity to audition Simon House as Dettmar's replacement, House having been known to the group via his time with High Tide, who had shared the same management company of Douglas Smith's Clearwater Productions. These dates were professionally recorded, with the performances of "You'd Better Believe It", "Paradox" and "It's So Easy" appearing on the album and singles, albeit with studio overdubs.

The group returned to North America a second time for a more comprehensive tour consisting of 22 dates in March and April under the banner of "1999 Party", taking their entire entourage with them including dancer Stacia, MC and DJ Andy Dunkley, a lightshow by Jonathan Smeeton (Liquid Len) and support from United Artists Records label mates Man. Although Dettmar had not yet left the group, House joined the band for this tour, but not having the appropriate work permit, his performances were strictly unofficial. The Chicago and Detroit shows on 21 and 23 March were professionally recorded, the former being released in 1997 as The 1999 Party.

Returning to England, the band went to Clearwell Castle to rehearse, then entered Olympic Studios to record this album in May and June, with help from producers Doug Bennett and Roy Thomas Baker. The lead singles "Psychedelic Warlords (Disappear in Smoke)" (coupled with "It's So Easy") in the UK and an alternative version of "You'd Better Believe It" (coupled with "Paradox") in France were issued on 2 August, followed by the album on 6 September. Alternative studio versions of "It's So Easy", "You'd Better Believe It" and "Wind of Change" were later released in 2011 on Parallel Universe.

== Tour ==
A nine date European tour at the end of June was undertaken. However, drummer Simon King had cracked some ribs playing football, prohibiting his participation, so nominated his friend Alan Powell to deputise for him on the dates. By the end of tour, King had recuperated sufficiently to resume playing alongside Powell, and the group were happy enough with the arrangement of two drummers that Powell was pulled into the group's permanent line-up. At the completion of the tour, Dettmar finally departed.

The group returned for a third tour of North America in September, but on their fifth date at Hammond, Indiana on the 7th, their equipment was impounded by the IRS and they were issued a bill for unpaid taxes from their previous tour. An impasse ensued, and the band finally continued the tour a month later after all issues had been resolved.

== Reception ==
Professional ratings
Review scores
| Source | Rating |
|---|---|
| AllMusic | 4.5/5 stars |
| The Encyclopedia of Popular Music | 3/5 stars |
| Head Heritage | (mixed) |

Hall of the Mountain Grill reached number 16 on the UK album charts and number 110 in the US. Its release was preceded by an edited single of "The Psychedelic Warlords" b/w "It's So Easy" in August. "Paradox" b/w "You'd Better Believe It" was issued as a single in Europe, both sides also being edits. All four of these tracks appeared on EMI's 2001 CD re-issue of the album. An EP featuring "The Psychedelic Warlords", "Hall of the Mountain Grill", "D-Rider" and "Wind of Change" was released as a promo in the US in 1974.

Retrospective reviews have been generally positive. Though they were critical of the title track, AllMusic called Hall of the Mountain Grill "The band's best studio album" and "the quintessential guitar-oriented space rock record". Head Heritage were far less impressed, contending that the departures of Robert Calvert and Dik Mik were losses that Hawkwind could not remotely compensate for, and that the entire album "has the undeniable feel of a stop-gap album released half-desperately to keep the machinery of Hawkwind's constant touring well-greased". They added, however, that the album's two live tracks are highlights of the Hawkwind catalogue.

== Track listing ==
All songs written by Dave Brock except where noted.

Side one
| No. | Title | Writer(s) | Length |
|---|---|---|---|
| 1. | "The Psychedelic Warlords (Disappear in Smoke)" | | 6:50 |
| 2. | "Wind of Change" | | 5:08 |
| 3. | "D-Rider" | Nik Turner | 6:14 |
| 4. | "Web Weaver" | | 3:15 |

Side two
| No. | Title | Writer(s) | Length |
|---|---|---|---|
| 5. | "You'd Better Believe It" (live 26 Jan 1974 at Edmonton Sundown) | | 7:13 |
| 6. | "Hall of the Mountain Grill" | Simon House | 2:24 |
| 7. | "Lost Johnny" | Ian Kilmister, Mick Farren | 3:30 |
| 8. | "Goat Willow" | Del Dettmar | 1:37 |
| 9. | "Paradox" (live 26 Jan 1974 at Edmonton Sundown) | | 5:35 |

Remasters CD bonus tracks
| No. | Title | Length |
|---|---|---|
| 10. | "You'd Better Believe It" (Single Version Edit) (live 26 Jan 1974 at Edmonton Sundown) | 3:22 |
| 11. | "The Psychedelic Warlords (Disappear in Smoke)" (Single Version) | 3:57 |
| 12. | "Paradox" (Remix Single Edit) (live 26 Jan 1974 at Edmonton Sundown) | 4:04 |
| 13. | "It's So Easy" (live 26 Jan 1974 at Edmonton Sundown) | 5:20 |

== Personnel ==
Hawkwind

- Dave Brock – lead guitar, 12-string guitar, synthesizer, organ, harmonica, vocals
- Nik Turner – saxophone, oboe, flute, vocals
- Lemmy (Ian Kilmister) – bass, vocals, guitars
- Simon House – synthesizer, Mellotron, violin
- Simon King – drums, percussion
- Del Dettmar – keyboards, synthesizer, kalimba

== Charts ==
| Chart (1974) | Peak position |
|---|---|
| Australian Albums (Kent Music Report) | 92 |
| UK Albums (Official Charts) | 16 |
| US Billboard 200 | 110 |

== Certifications ==
| Region | Certification | Certified units/sales |
|---|---|---|
| United Kingdom (BPI) | Silver | 60,000^{^} |
^{^} Shipments figures based on certification alone.

== Release history ==
- Sep 1974: United Artists Records, UAG 29672, UK vinyl – original issues came in single sleeve with inner sleeve
- Jan 1981: Liberty Records, LBG29672, UK vinyl
- Oct 1985: EMI Fame, FA413133-1, UK vinyl
- May 1989: EMI Fame, CDFA3133, UK CD
- Oct 1992: One Way Records, S2147660, USA CD
- Mar 1996: EMI Remasters, HAWKS5, UK CD – initial copies in digipak
- 11 October 2010: Rock Classics, RCV012LP, UK, 2x12" yellow vinyl 1000 copies
- 19 September 2025: Cherry Red Records, UK, CD, 2LP and 7CD/2Blu-Ray boxed set which includes single A and B sides, studio out-takes, live concerts from Edmonton Sundown London (25 January 1974), Auditorium Chicago (21 March 1974), Cleveland Allen Theatre (22 March 1974), and a new stereo up-mix and surround sound of the original album by Stephen W Tayler.
