= The Text of Festival =

Compilation album by Hawkwind
- Released: 16 September 1983
- Recorded: BBC Sessions 1970–71; Colchester Technical College, 19 February 1971
- Genre: Space rock
- Label: Illuminated Records

Hawkwind chronology
Hawkwind, Friends and Relations (1982)	The Text of Festival (1983)	Zones (1983)

Professional ratings
Review scores
Source	Rating
The Encyclopedia of Popular Music	2/5 stars

The Text of Festival is an archive album by Hawkwind consisting of BBC sessions and live performances between 1970 and 1971. It was originally released in 1983 after the band had exited their Active Records contract, and has continuously been repackaged and retitled ever since.

The copyright of the recordings on the first disc is owned by the BBC who were not approached for permission for their commercial use, so the legality of this album is questionable. The source tapes used are not from the BBC, but inferior-quality off-air recordings of the broadcast. The recordings have also appeared on The Weird Tapes, Hawkwind, Friends and Relations and Hawkwind Anthology.

== Track listing ==
=== Side 1 ===
1. "Master of the Universe" (Nik Turner, Dave Brock) – 6:00
2. "You Know You're Only Dreaming" (Brock) – 4:15
3. "You Shouldn't Do That" (Turner, Brock) – 5:52
4. "Hurry on Sundown" (Brock) – 6:20

=== Side 2 ===
5. "Paranoia" (Hawkwind)
  "Seeing It As You Really Are" (Hawkwind) – 11:50
6. "We Do It" (Hawkwind) – 13:45

=== Side 3 ===
7. "You Shouldn't Do That" (Hawkwind) – 21:35 [listed as "Sound, Shouldn't, Improvise"]

=== Side 4 ===
8. "The Reason Is?" (Hawkwind) – 11:35
  "Be Yourself" (Hawkwind) – 5:51 [listed as "Improvise, Compromise, Reprise"]

== Personnel ==
- Dave Brock - guitar, vocals
- Nik Turner - saxophone, flute, vocals
- Huw Lloyd-Langton - guitar (track 4)
- Thomas Crimble - bass guitar (tracks 4–6 and disc 2)
- Dave Anderson - bass guitar (tracks 1–3)
- Dik Mik Davies - Synthesizer
- Terry Ollis - drums

== Notes ==
- "Come Home" is listed on the album following "We Do It", but has never been included on any of the releases of this album. It does appear on the Hawkwind Anthology compilation set.
- "The Reason Is?" and "Be Yourself" have never been issued on any of the CD versions.
- Later releases erroneously claim that this recording is from the Cambridge Corn Exchange. There is a recording in existence from The Six Hour Technicolor Dream featuring Hawkwind, Pink Fairies and Syd Barrett at the Cambridge Corn Exchange on 27 January 1972, the Hawkwind portion of which was released in 2011 as Leave No Star Unturned (see Discogs entry).

Sources

- Track 1–3: Maida Vale, London, 19 May 1971; Broadcast: Sounds of the Seventies, 27 May 1971 (with Wishbone Ash) & 24 June 1971 (with Cochise).
- Track 4: Maida Vale, 18 August 1970; Broadcast: Top Gear, 19 September 1970. Tracks originally broadcast from this session: "Hurry on Sundown", "Seeing It As You Really Are" and "Some of That Stuff" [aka "Come Home"].
- Track 5–6: Paris Cinema, London, 5 November 1970; Broadcast: John Peel Sunday Concert, 15 November 1970.
- Disc 2: Recorded at Colchester Technical College, 19 February 1971 (with Uriah Heep).

Credits

- Cover art by John Coulthart.
- The album title is a reference to the debut novel by Mick Farren.

== Release history ==
Date	Title	Format	Region	Label, Catalogue	Note
Jul/1983	The Text of Festival	2x12"vinyl	UK	Illuminated Records, JAMS29	
Jul/1985	In the Beginning	CD	UK	Demi Monde, DM005	sides 1 and 2
Nov/1988	The Text of Festival	2x12"vinyl	UK, Germany	Thunderbolt THBL 2.068	
Dec/1988	The Text of Festival	CD	UK	Thunderbolt CDTB 2.068	sides 1–3
Jul/1992	Masters of the Universe	CD	UK, USA, Germany	Thunderbolt, CDTB105	sides 1 and 2
1993	The Text of Festival	CD	UK	Thunderbolt CDTB 068	sides 1–3
1996	Masters of the Universe	CD digipak	France	Spalax, SPALAXCD14972	sides 1 and 2
Jan/1996	Masters of the Universe	CD	USA	Magnum America, MACD028	sides 1 and 2
Feb/1998	Welcome to the Future	CD1 of 4	UK	Dressed to Kill, CLP0220-2	sides 1 and 2
Feb/1998	Welcome to the Future	CD4 of 4	UK	Dressed to Kill, CLP0220-2	sides 1–3
Mar/1999	The Entire and Infinite Universe of Hawkwind	CD1 of 4	UK	Dressed to Kill, REDTK98	sides 1 and 2
Mar/1999	The Entire and Infinite Universe of Hawkwind	CD4 of 4	UK	Dressed to Kill, REDTK98	sides 1–3
Aug/1999	Live 1970 1972	CD	UK	Pegasus, PEGCD197	sides 1–3
Sep/1999	Year 2000: Codename Hawkwind	CD2 of 2	UK	New Millennium Communications, PILOT33	sides 1 and 2
2000	Bring Me the Head of Yuri Gagarin: Live At the Empire Pool 1976	CD2 of 2	Germany	Falcon	sides 1 and 2, omits "Master of the Universe"
Oct/2002	Cosmic Overdrive	CD2 of 2	UK	New Millennium Communications, PILOT 146	sides 1 and 2
Mar/2005	Codename Hawkwind	CD	UK	Neptune Records, TUNECD102	sides 1 and 2
