= Mike Stuart Span =

1960s British pop band

The Mike Stuart Span was a British 1960s pop band consisting of Stuart Hobday (lead vocals), Brian Bennett (lead guitar, vocals), Roger McCabe (bass guitar, vocals), and Gary Murphy (drums). Their critical reputation is based almost exclusively on the merits of a handful of rare or unreleased recordings. In 1969, they briefly changed their name to Leviathan, before splitting up.

== Early history ==
The Mike Stuart Span evolved out of a Brighton-based group called the Mighty Atoms, which included vocalist Stuart Hobday and bassist Roger McCabe. By 1965, Hobday's early attempts at songwriting had secured a publishing contract with Lorna Music, and the Mike Stuart Span – a name created by reversing the singer's Christian names – was formed. In addition to Hobday and McCabe, the embryonic Span included Nigel Langham (guitar), Ashley Potter (organ) and a teenage drummer Gary "Roscoe" Murphy.

A liaison with local promoter / manager Mike Clayton, resulted in the replacement of Potter with Jon Poulter, and the addition of a four piece horn section. For economy this was soon reduced to two (Gary Parsley on trumpet and Dave Plumb on saxophone) as the band concentrated their efforts on American-derived soul music. However, within a few months, guitarist Langham fell to his death after leaping through an upstairs window whilst under the effects of LSD.

== Recordings as the Mike Stuart Span ==
The band secured a recording contract with EMI, after recording the Hobday penned "Work-Out", coupled with a cover of The Drifters, "Follow Me". However, it was another Drifters number, "Come on Over to Our Place" that was selected as the A-side for the band's debut single on the Columbia label in November 1966, backed by another Hobday original "Still Nights". A second single followed in June 1967, a Cat Stevens song "Dear", supported by Mike d'Abo's "Invitation". This was equally unsuccessful, and EMI decided to drop the band.

EMI's decision forced the Span to dismiss the horns section, with keyboardist Poulter also departing shortly afterwards. An advertisement in Melody Maker recruited guitarist Brian Bennett, who had previously been a member of Tony's Defenders. With a line-up of Hobday, Bennett, McCabe and Gary Murphy, the revitalised band paid more attention to the importance of studio work, starting with an October 1967 session at Decca Records with Dave Paramor who had produced their EMI singles. Three tracks were recorded: a version of Fontella Bass' "Rescue Me", the Murphy / Bennett original "Second Production" and an instrumental that "As Close As We Can Get It", due to Paramor's insistence that the track should last two and a half minutes (the instrumental ran to 2 minutes 28 seconds - hence the title). However, Decca decided that the recordings were insufficiently commercial, and declined to sign the band.

Without record company support, the Span took matters into their own hands, privately funding a single that appeared on 16 February 1968 on the Jewel label – a new Melodisc subsidiary run by Emil Shallit. The two tracks "Children of Tomorrow" and "Concerto of Thoughts" were recorded at R.G. Jones studio in Morden. The single was pressed in a quantity of 500 copies and now acknowledged by psychedelic collectors. However, publicity both at home and abroad brought a cameo appearance in the film, Better a Widow, successful tours of Germany and Belgium, a support appearance with Cream in the UK, jamming with Jimi Hendrix at the Speakeasy (Bennett was so nervous at the prospect of performing with his idol that he dropped his plectrum), and the performance of a 20-minute science fiction fantasy entitled "Cycle" at London's 100 Club.

Following a session for the John Peel's Top Gear programme in May 1968, the Span was chosen as the featured group in a BBC Television series produced by documentary film-maker Paul Watson, called A Year in the Life. The episode charted the band's progress over twelve months. Along the way they dismissed their manager and, thanks to a series of demonstration recordings reaching Clive Selwood, head of the UK branch of Elektra Records, the Span was duly signed to the label early in 1969. In the United States, label boss Jac Holzman immediately commissioned an album, but insisted on a change of name for the group.

== Leviathan ==
Rechristened Leviathan, Elektra launched their recording career in April 1969, with the simultaneous issue of two singles. Three of the chosen tracks - "Remember the Times", "Second Production" and "Time" had been initially been conceived as Span recordings, and the newly composed "The War Machine" completed the quartet. Elektra's media campaign was titled 'The Four Faces of Leviathan'. Despite the commercial failure of both singles, work continued on the band's album at Trident Studios. As a taster for the LP, a further single coupling "Flames" and "Just Forget Tomorrow" was recorded in the summer. By the time that it surfaced in October 1969, however, Leviathan had split up. Holzman stated dissatisfication with the album, and Bennett, who had returned to the band part-time, felt that he could earn more as a building site labourer.

== After the split ==
Consequently, when A Year in the Life was broadcast in late September 1969, the group had gone their separate ways. McCabe withdrew from the music industry, while Hobday embarked on a successful career with the BBC as a record producer. Bennett joined the final incarnation of Jason Crest. Murphy joined a local blues progressive outfit, Hellmet, who recorded sufficient material for an unreleased album.

By the mid-1980s the band had become a cult name amongst collectors of obscure British psychedelic records, an interest intensified by the BBC's decision to broadcast an updated A Year in the Life in December 1989 (subsequently repeated in early 1991). This facilitated the 1995 release of the CD, Timespan.

== Band members ==
=== Mike Stuart Span ===
- Stuart Hobday – vocals
- Roger McCabe – bass guitar
- Dave Plumb – tenor saxophone
- Garry Parsley – trumpet
- Jon Poulter – keyboards
- Gary "Roscoe" Murphy – drums

=== Leviathan ===
- Stuart Hobday – vocals
- Roger McCabe – bass guitar
- Brian Bennett – lead guitar
- Gary "Roscoe" Murphy – drums

== Discography ==
=== Singles ===
- "Come on Over to Our Place" / "Still Nights" (Columbia DB 8066)
- "Dear" / "Invitation" (Columbia DB 8206)
- "Children of Tomorrow" / "Concerto of Thoughts" (Jewel JL 01
- "You Can Understand Me" / "Baubles & Bangles" (Fontana TF 959)
- "Remember the Times" / "Second Production" (Elektra EKSN 45052)
- "The War Machine" / "Time" (Elektra EKSN 4505701)
- "Flames" / "Just Forget Tomorrow" (Elektra EKSN 45075)

=== Unreleased Elektra album ===
- Leviathan

=== CDs ===
- Timespan (Wooden Hill WHCD003) Released 1995
1. "Children of Tomorrow"
2. "Second Production"
3. "Remember the Times"
4. "Time"
5. "Concerto of Thoughts"
6. "Flames"
7. "Through the Looking Glass"
8. "Rescue Me"
9. "World in My Head"
10. "Evil Woman"
11. "Blue Day"
12. "Through the Looking Glass" (BBC session)
13. "My White Bicycle" (BBC session)
14. "Time" (BBC session)
15. "Children of Tomorrow" (BBC session)
- Children of Tomorrow (Grapefruit CRSEG 021) Released 2011
1. "Come on Over to Our Place"
2. "Still Nights"
3. "Dear"
4. "Invitation"
5. "Children of Tomorrow"
6. "Concerto of Thoughts"
7. "You Can Understand Me"
8. "Baubles and Bangles"
9. "Second Production"
10. "Rescue Me"
11. "World in My Head"
12. "Time"
13. "Flames"
14. "Blue Day"
15. "Remember the Times"
16. "Wanderin' Eye" (bonus track)
17. "You Can Understand Me" (radio version) (bonus track)
18. "Follow Me" (bonus track)
19. "Work Out" (bonus track)

== Film ==
- Better a Widow (1969)

== Television ==
- 1969: BBC Documentary – A Year in the Life, produced by Paul Watson
