= Barney Bubbles =

English graphic artist (1942–1983)

- Born: Colin Fulcher; 30 July 1942; Whitton, Middlesex, England
- Died: 14 November 1983 (aged 41); Islington, Greater London, England
- Resting place: London, England
- Education: Twickenham College of Technology
- Notable work: The design of the Radar Records logo and the redesign of the NME logo. Damned Damned Damned, Music For Pleasure, My Aim Is True, This Year's Model, Armed Forces, Labour of Lust album covers.
- Awards: British Poster Design Awards (1964/65)

Barney Bubbles (born Colin Fulcher; 30 July 1942 – 14 November 1983) was an English graphic artist whose work encompassed graphic design and music video direction. Bubbles, who also sketched and painted privately, contributed to the design practices associated with the British independent music scene of the 1970s and 1980s. His record sleeves featured symbols and riddles.

== Early life ==
Fulcher was born in Tranmere Road, Whitton, Middlesex (now Greater London), in July 1942. He attended Isleworth Grammar School. In 1958 he embarked on a retail display course for a National Diploma in Design (NDD) at the art school of Twickenham College of Technology. During his five years at the college Fulcher received a multi-disciplinary education that included training in cardboard design, display and packaging, skills that would be utilised later in his record sleeve work.

== Career ==
=== Michael Tucker + Associates ===
After leaving college in 1963, Fulcher worked as an assistant at the design company Michael Tucker + Associates in London. Its clients included Pirelli. In a rare interview in November 1981 in The Face, Bubbles described Tucker's discipline as "very Swiss; very hard; unjustified, very grey; and he taught me everything about typography." Tucker's studio produced the posters for Hugh Hudson's Pirelli-sponsored film The Tortoise & The Hare (1967), for which Fulcher designed the poster lettering on a freelance basis.

=== The Conran Group ===
In May 1965, Fulcher was recruited by The Conran Group as senior graphic designer alongside Stafford Cliff, Virginia Clive-Smith and John Muggeridge. He produced a variety of commercial commissions for Conran, including the Norman-style archer logo for Strongbow cider and items for Conran's new homewares chain Habitat. Fulcher also established an association with Justin de Blank, a director at Conran, which blossomed when de Blank left to launch his own upmarket provisions company and restaurant business in 1968.

=== A1 Good Guyz and other early activities ===
Between 1965 and 1966, Fulcher organised happenings, parties and other events under the name A1 Good Guyz with two graduates of Twickenham Art College, David Wills and Roy Burge.

In 1967, Fulcher became known as Barney Bubbles, although he did not change his name by deed poll for several more years. The name came about when Fulcher was operating a light show that created a bubble effect by mixing oils and water on projection slides. These lightshows were for groups including the Gun and Quintessence at underground venues including the Roundhouse, Jim Haynes's Drury Lane Arts Lab, the Electric Cinema and Middle Earth.

With Wills, Bubbles undertook freelance design commissions, including a redesign of Motor Racing magazine and a recipe book for the English Egg Marketing Board. With a team of contributors Bubbles and Wills art-directed Oz magazine issue 12, dubbed The Tax Dodge Special and published in May 1968.

=== Teenburger Designs ===
The original UK LP sleeve of Brinsley Schwarz's Brinsley Schwarz (1970) designed by Barney Bubbles

Early in 1969, Bubbles took the lease on a three-storey building at 307 Portobello Road in Notting Hill Gate, West London. He converted the ground-floor space into a graphic art studio, which he named Teenburger Designs. With a business association established with two entrepreneurs, Edward Molton and Stephen Warwick, and with John Muggeridge from Conran serving briefly as an assistant, he set about working primarily for the music industry. His first record sleeve design was for Quintessence's LP In Blissful Company (1969). The gatefold sleeve design uses illustrations by Gopala on the front and back, and contains a monochrome glued-in booklet inside.

Teenburger also provided record sleeve designs for the bands Brinsley Schwarz and Red Dirt, as well as Vertigo artists such as Cressida, Gracious! and Dr Z, whose LP Three Parts to My Soul is particularly noted for its complex and colourful fold-out sleeve.

Following the closure of Teenburger in 1970 as a result of the disappearance of Molton and Warwick, Bubbles worked as the designer of the underground press newspaper Friends (later renamed Frendz).

Bubbles' son, Aten Skinner, who is also an artists and graphic designer, was born in 1972.

=== Hawkwind (and other 1970s rock) ===
The original UK LP sleeve of Hawkwind's In Search of Space designed by Barney Bubbles

While he was working at Friends, Bubbles formed an association with Hawkwind and became responsible for a run of their album sleeves, including In Search of Space, Doremi Fasol Latido and Space Ritual. Bubbles engaged in many aspects of the group's visual identity, titling releases and designing posters, adverts, stage decoration and performance plans, some of which were adorned with mystical and mock-Teutonic insignia. In 1972 Bubbles produced the triple LP package Glastonbury Fayre. This comprised a six-panel fold-out card sleeve, two poster inserts, a booklet and a cut-out and build miniature pyramid, housed in a clear vinyl bag (with two sleeve variations and three label variations).

From 1973 onwards, Bubbles increasingly avoided credits for his artwork, typically working anonymously or occasionally adopting alternative pseudonyms. During this period he designed album sleeves and additional material for such acts as the Sutherland Brothers, Kevin Coyne, Edgar Broughton Band, Chilli Willi and the Red Hot Peppers, Quiver, the Kursaal Flyers and Michael Moorcock and the Deep Fix.

In 1976, his design relationship with Hawkwind came to an end. It was rekindled once, in 1978, for the Hawklords spin-off, but otherwise continued only with design commissions for projects involving the band's saxophonist Nik Turner.

=== Stiff, Radar and F Beat (and other punk and new wave) ===
The original UK LP sleeve of Carlene Carter's C'est C Bon designed by Barney Bubbles

Barney Bubbles joined Stiff Records as designer and art director early in 1977. With the label's co-founder Jake Riviera he generated a body of work that helped to secure Stiff's reputation as a new independent label. Bubbles created sleeves for bands including the Damned, Elvis Costello, Ian Dury and Wreckless Eric. Often these were accompanied by logos such as the face logo for Blockhead, advertisements and promotional items. The marketing of Elvis Costello's My Aim Is True included advertisements in three UK music papers from which a poster of Costello could be constructed, and the first 1,000 pressings contained an insert headed Help Us Hype Elvis, which, if completed and returned to Stiff, ensured that a friend would receive a free copy.

When Riviera left Stiff in late 1977, Bubbles joined him at his new label Radar Records and later at Riviera's F-Beat Records. At these labels, Bubbles created more designs for Elvis Costello, as well as other artists such as Nick Lowe, Carlene Carter, Blanket of Secrecy and Clive Langer & The Boxes.

Bubbles also maintained his freelance output, producing designs for Peter Jenner (Ian Dury and Billy Bragg's manager), and others. He created a prodigious output by working for such bands, musicians and performers as Peter Hammill, Vivian Stanshall, Generation X, Big Star, Johnny Moped, Whirlwind, Billy Bragg, Clover, the Sinceros, Roger Chapman, Phillip Goodhand-Tait, Dr. Feelgood, Inner City Unit and the Psychedelic Furs. As a result, his work appeared on releases by labels such as Aura, Chiswick, Utility, Go! Discs, Epic, Charisma, CBS, Line Records, United Artists and Riddle Records. Examples include:

The original UK 45rpm single picture sleeve of Ian Dury and the Blockheads' "Hit Me with Your Rhythm Stick" designed by Barney Bubbles

- Elvis Costello: This Year's Model, which was designed to have a deliberate miscropping so that the entire design was off-register and a sticker that read 'Free Album With This Single'
- The Damned: Damned Damned Damned, a limited number of which were deliberately printed with a photo of Eddie and the Hot Rods on the back of the cover, rather than the Damned playing at The Roxy (Covent Garden), and with an erratum sticker apologising for this "mistake", and on the front of the LP, on top of the original shrinkwrap, a red food-fight sticker saying 'Damned Damned', thus completing the LP's title when read underneath the band's name
- Elvis Costello: Armed Forces, with an extended back panel consisting of folding flaps, postcards carrying the instruction DON'T JOIN (advice against joining the armed forces), and a message that these postcards had been die-cut from the rest of the sleeve
- Nick Lowe: Labour of Lust, with its innovative "Hamer & sickle" logo, fashioning Lowe's Hamer-brand bass guitar into a playful version of the actual Hammer and sickle, the symbol of proletarian solidarity first adopted during the Russian Revolution (Bubbles's original mockup is shown on the gatefold sleeve of the 2011 Yep Roc reissue of the album)
- Ian Dury and the Blockheads: Do It Yourself, which was released in at least 30 known sleeve variations, all of which were old designs supplied by Crown Wallpaper.

=== Music promo videos ===
Barney Bubbles directed several videos, including the Specials' "Ghost Town", Squeeze's "Is That Love" and "Tempted", Elvis Costello's "Clubland" and "New Lace Sleeves", and Fun Boy Three's "The Lunatics (Have Taken Over the Asylum)". Two promos for the punk rock band Johnny Moped, "Incendiary Device" and "Darling Let's Have Another Baby", were never commercially released to broadcasters.

"A good video can sell a record which might not do so well," Bubbles told Smash Hits magazine in 1982. "The record companies know that. I think Chrysalis would agree that The Specials' 'Ghost Town' video helped sales a good deal. This year I intend to make videos which are really inexpensive but really inventive. It can be done, you know."

=== NME ===
Bubbles' logo for the NME

In 1979, riding on the reputation of his work for Stiff, Bubbles was engaged by the UK music newspaper New Musical Express to spearhead an overhaul of its decades-old brand. Bubbles' redesign incorporated elements of Pop art and 1920s Soviet poster art into a "sleek, forward-looking" graphic format. His restyling included a fresh logo with "clean, stencilled, military-style lettering", which heralded the title's change from New Musical Express to NME.

=== Other work ===
In 1979, Derek Boshier curated an exhibition entitled Lives at the Hayward Gallery, London, and he commissioned Bubbles to design the catalogue and poster. Together with the photographer Chris Gabrin, Bubbles also exhibited a video and mixed-media installation in the exhibition.

In the early 1980s, Bubbles created furniture designs, some of which were featured in The Face, November 1981.

In 1982, Bubbles conceived the album Ersatz, working primarily with Nik Turner and other musicians from Inner City Unit. The LP was released under the name of The Imperial Pompadours.

Bubbles painted privately, increasingly in the early 1980s.

== Death ==
Fulcher, who suffered from bipolar disorder, committed suicide in London on 14 November 1983 by gassing himself, trapping the fumes in a plastic bag he placed over his head, at the age of 41. He had considerable personal and financial worries, and had fallen out of fashion in the early 1980s. His designs for record sleeves were being rejected by musicians and record companies, and he was being investigated by the Inland Revenue for unpaid taxes dating back several years. He was also displaying increasingly erratic behaviour, alarming close friends by lacerating his face with razor blades and making threats to kill himself.

== Monograph/biography ==
Reasons To Be Cheerful: The Life & Work of Barney Bubbles, a hybrid monograph-biography by Paul Gorman containing 400-plus images of artworks by Bubbles and contributions from British designers Peter Saville and Malcolm Garrett along with Billy Bragg was published in November 2008 by independent British imprint Adelita. The book was welcomed as a long-overdue recognition of Bubbles' achievements and selected by British music magazine Mojo as its Book Of The Year.

A revised and updated second edition of Reasons To Be Cheerful, with an additional contribution by US graphic artist Art Chantry, was published by Adelita in October 2010.

The third edition of the monograph, retitled The Wild World of Barney Bubbles: Graphic Design and the Art of Music, with a new cover and updated sections including previously unpublished designs and an essay by American graphic designer Clarita Hinojosa, was published by Thames & Hudson in June 2022 in the UK and in July 2022 in the US.

A companion limited-edition box-set, A Box of Bubbles, containing the monograph with a different jacket and reproductions of the designer's artworks for Ian Dury, Hawkwind and the Glastonbury Fayre triple-LP package, was published by specialist imprint Volume in September 2022.

== Influence and legacy ==
'To say that Bubbles' work was influential would be an understatement. He took the world by storm with his momentous contribution,' wrote Creative Boom's Aya Angelos in 2022. According to Peter Saville, 'The work of Barney Bubbles expresses post-modern principles: that there is the past, the present and the possible; that culture and the history of culture are a fluid palette of semiotic expression and everything is available to articulate a point of view.'

The first exhibition dedicated to Bubbles' work was held at London gallery Artomatic in 2001, curated by the art-design team Rebecca And Mike.

Paul Gorman and Caz Facey curated an exhibition about Bubbles' practice entitled Process: The Working Practices of Barney Bubbles at London gallery Chelsea Space in October 2010.

In January 2012, BBC Radio 4 broadcast a documentary, In Search of Barney Bubbles, written, produced and presented by Mark Hodkinson.

In summer 2012 Gorman curated The Past The Present & The Possible, which presented 250 examples of Bubbles' finished artworks as part of the exhibition White Noise at the 23rd International Poster & Graphic Design Festival in Chaumont, France.

Under the heading Génération Bubbles!, the cover and a 10-page feature in the July 2012 issue of French design magazine Étapes were dedicated to the exhibition and Bubbles' influence over contemporary design practice.

In 2017 Gorman curated "Optics & Semantics", an exhibition which included furniture designed by Bubbles, at central London's Rob Tufnell Gallery as well as a show featuring finished artworks including record sleeves, posters and ephemera at casualwear brand Fred Perry's outlet in Covent Garden.

In 2020 an archive of Bubbles work was acquired for public collections under the UK's cultural gifts and acceptance in lieu (AiL) schemes and allocated to Liverpool John Moores University.

== General and group exhibitions ==
Designs by Barney Bubbles have been featured in exhibitions, including Destroy: Punk Graphic Design in Britain, held at London's Southbank Centre in 1998, Communicate: British Independent Graphic Design since the Sixties, staged at the Barbican Centre in 2004, Too Fast To Live, Too Young To Die: Punk Graphics 1976 - 1986 at Cranbrook Art Museum in Michigan in 2017 and the Museum of Art & Design in New York in 2019 and Torn Apart: Punk New Wave and the Graphic Aftermath 1976-86 at the Pacific Design Center in Los Angeles in 2022.

Bubbles works are in the permanent collections of The Museum of Modern Art in New York and London's Victoria and Albert Museum, which gave prominence to a selection in its 2011 show Postmodernism: Style & Subversion 1970–1990 and the following year's British Design 1948–2012.

== Barney Bubbles Estate ==
Representing family members, the Barney Bubbles Estate controls the intellectual copyrights in hundreds of original designs by Bubbles and has worked with others to ensure that the designer's legacy is protected.

Projects include a capsule collection of shirts bearing Bubbles designs with Fred Perry in 2017, Elvis Costello and Universal Music's 2020 box-set reissue of Costello's 1979 album Armed Forces, the 12-inch vinyl rerelease of "Hit Me With Your Rhythm Stick" for Record Store Day 2021 with the Ian Dury Estate and music group BMG and a collaboration of four T-shirts with New York streetwear label Noah in 2022.
