= Space Ritual =

1973 live album by Hawkwind

The Space Ritual Alive in Liverpool and London

Live album by Hawkwind
- Released: 11 May 1973
- Recorded: 22 December 1972 at Liverpool Stadium; 30 December 1972 at Brixton Sundown, London
- Genres: Space rock; psychedelic rock; progressive rock; proto-punk; hard rock
- Length: 86:55
- Labels: United Artists (most of the world); Liberty (Japan)
- Producer: Hawkwind

Hawkwind chronology
Doremi Fasol Latido (1972)	The Space Ritual Alive in Liverpool and London (1973)	Hall of the Mountain Grill (1974)

Space Ritual (officially known as The Space Ritual Alive in Liverpool and London) is a 1973 live double album recorded in 1972 by UK rock band Hawkwind. It is their fourth album since their debut, Hawkwind, in 1970. It reached number 9 in the UK Albums Chart and briefly dented the Billboard Hot 200, peaking at number 179.

== Background and recording ==
The album was recorded during the tour to promote their Doremi Fasol Latido album, which comprises the bulk of this set. In addition there are new tracks ("Born To Go", "Upside Down" and "Orgone Accumulator") and the songs are interspersed by electronic and spoken pieces, making this one continuous performance. Their recent hit single "Silver Machine" was excluded from the set, and only "Master of the Universe" remains from their first two albums.

The Space Ritual show attempted to create a full audio-visual experience, representing themes developed by Barney Bubbles and Robert Calvert entwining the fantasy of starfarers in suspended animation travelling through time and space with the concept of the music of the spheres. The performance featured dancers Stacia, Miss Renee and Tony Carrera, stage set by Bubbles, lightshow by Liquid Len and poetry recitations by Calvert. On entering the venue, audience members were given a programme (reproduced on the 1996 remaster CD) featuring a short sci-fi story by Bubbles setting the band in a Starfarers scenario returning to Earth. (Note: Dave Brock: "Barney's taking over the concept that originally came from Bob. Barney's continuing where Bob left off - writing the whole story and the programme - the whole fantasy to go with the show. Originally Bob was going to be the Grand Wizard, reading poetry on stage, but he's kind of vanished and I don't know whether he's going to be doing it with us. He might turn up and do part of it, but Nik's going to do the poetry and he'll be the wizard. Barney's done all the designs, written the story, done all the posters, things like that - all the design side.")

The original release featured edits and overdubs, the sleeve notes explaining that "We had to cut a piece out of Brainstorm and Time We Left because they were too long", but the 1985 Space Ritual Volume 2 album contains the full unedited versions. A previously unheard edited version of "You Shouldn't Do That" (segued with an unlisted "Seeing It As You Really Are") from this concert was included on the 1976 Roadhawks compilation album, then subsequently included as a bonus track on the 1996 remaster CD. The full unedited version of the track can be found on the Hawkwind Anthology album. June 2007 saw another EMI 2CD remaster issue with different bonus tracks and DVD-audio - this remaster would be reissued in 2013, minus the DVD-audio.

"Sonic Attack" had been written by science fiction author Michael Moorcock, who often performed with the band when convenient and Calvert was unavailable. Here it is recited by Calvert and it was scheduled for single release, promotional copies being distributed in a cloth sleeve, but it never did receive a full release.

The album was recorded at Liverpool Stadium, 22 December 1972 and Brixton Sundown, 30 December 1972 by Vic Maile and the Pye Mobile. It was produced by Hawkwind, then mixed by Vic Maile and Anton Matthews at Olympic Studios, Barnes. The bonus track "You Shouldn't Do That" was recorded at Brixton Sundown, 30 December 1972, and originally released on the Roadhawks compilation album. "Master Of The Universe" and "Born To Go", bonus tracks on the 1996 2CD release, were recorded at The Roundhouse, 13 February 1972, and originally released on the Greasy Truckers Party various artists album.

- "The Awakening" is a spoken piece which had previously been printed in the Hawklog which accompanied the group's 1971 In Search of Space album.
- "Black Corridor" is a spoken piece, adapted from the Michael Moorcock book of the same name.
- "Orgone Accumulator" lyrics were inspired by Wilhelm Reich. Pop Will Eat Itself covered the song in 1987 on their "Love Missile F1-11" single.

== Music ==
Wilson Neate of AllMusic characterized the album's style as an "unhinged meld of prog, acid rock, proto metal, science fiction, fantasy, and jazz." Eduardo Rivadavia of Loudwire called the album "a thematically linked listening experience, so immersive, so hypnotic (with or without stark naked stage dancer Stacia), that chemical assistance wasn’t even required."

== Sleeve ==
The sleeve was designed by Barney Bubbles and came in 3x2 panel foldout, the outer 6 panels being colour, the inner 6 panels being monochrome, the discs in psychedelic patterned orange & yellow inner sleeves were folded into this.

== Release history ==
- May 1973: United Artists Records, UAD60037/8, UK vinyl – original issues came in 6-panel fold-out sleeve with inner sleeves. Subsequent releases in gatefold sleeve.
- September 1992: One Way Records, S2257659, USA CD
- March 1996: EMI Remasters, HAWKS4, UK CD – initial copies in digipak with reproduction of the Space Ritual tour programme (An extract from the Saga of Doremi Fasol Latido)
- June 2007: EMI Remasters, UK 2CD+DVD
- 11 October 2010: Rock Classics, RCV016LP, UK, 2x12" vinyl 1000 copies; RCV017LP, UK, 2x12" vinyl 1000 copies
- 21 January 2013: Parlophone Records, HAWKSS 4, Europe 2CD - re-issue of 2007 release, but without DVD - 6 panel fold-out inlay - track listing as per 1996 CD release Hawkwind - Space Ritual
- 29 September 2023: Cherry Red Records ATOMCD111053, UK, 10 CD + 1 Blu-Ray disc box-set including new stereo and 5.1 remixes by Stephen W. Tayler, plus new mixes of Liverpool, Brixton and Sunderland concerts from 1972, 68 page booklet with essay by Robert Godwin and reproduction original concert program.

== Reception and legacy ==
Professional ratings
Review scores
Source	Rating
AllMusic	4.5/5 stars
The Encyclopedia of Popular Music	4/5 stars
Head Heritage	(positive)
LouderSound	4.5/5 stars
Pitchfork Media	8.6/10

In the Q & Mojo Classic Special Edition Pink Floyd & The Story of Prog Rock, the album came number 8 in its list of "40 Cosmic Rock Albums". The album was also included in the book 1001 Albums You Must Hear Before You Die.

In 2020, Vlad Nichols of Ultimate Guitar wrote: "If Pink Floyd provided the initial explosion that took space rock off the ground, it was Hawkwind that propelled it beyond the atmosphere and kept it orbiting around the planet. Although a lot of people know it as the band in which Lemmy Kilmister played before he came up with Motörhead, Hawkwind's unique contribution to rock and metal is largely disregarded, which is a damn shame."

Wilson Neate of AllMusic stated that the album had aged well, and that Hawkwind were "prophetically influential."

== Track listing ==
Side 1

1. "Earth Calling" (Robert Calvert) – 1:44
2. "Born to Go" (Calvert, Dave Brock) – 9:56
3. "Down Through the Night" (Brock) – 6:16
4. "The Awakening" (Calvert) – 1:32

Side 2

1. "Lord of Light" (Brock) – 7:21
2. "Black Corridor" (Michael Moorcock) – 1:51
3. "Space Is Deep" (Brock) – 8:13
4. "Electronic No. 1" (Michael "Dik Mik" Davies, Del Dettmar) – 2:26

Side 3

1. "Orgone Accumulator" (Calvert, Brock) – 9:59
2. "Upside Down" (Brock) – 2:43
3. "10 Seconds of Forever" (Calvert) – 2:05
4. "Brainstorm" (Nik Turner) – 9:20

Side 4

1. "Seven By Seven" (Brock) – 6:11
2. "Sonic Attack" (Moorcock) – 2:54
3. "Time We Left This World Today" (Brock) – 5:47
4. "Master of the Universe" (Turner, Brock) – 7:37
5. "Welcome to the Future" (Calvert) – 2:04

Bonus tracks on 1996 Remasters CD

1. "You Shouldn't Do That" (Turner, Brock) / "Seeing It As You Really Are" [unlisted] (Brock) – 6:58
2. "Master of the Universe" (Turner, Brock) – 7:23
3. "Born to Go" (Calvert, Brock) – 13:02

2007 Digital remaster

CD 1

1. "Earth Calling"
2. "Born to Go"
3. "Down Through the Night"
4. "The Awakening"
5. "Lord of Light"
6. "Black Corridor"
7. "Space Is Deep"
8. "Electronic No. 1"
9. "Orgone Accumulator"
10. "Upside Down"
11. "10 Seconds of Forever"
12. "Brainstorm" (full version) - 13:46

CD 2

1. "7 By 7"
2. "Sonic Attack"
3. "Time We Left This World Today"
4. "Master of the Universe"
5. "Welcome to the Future" (full version) - 2:49
6. "You Shouldn't Do That" (full version) - 10:38
7. "Orgone Accumulator" (alternate nights performance) - 8:50
8. "Time We Left This World Today" (alternate nights performance) - 13:22
9. "You Shouldn't Do That" (alternate nights performance, from the Roadhawks compilation album) - 6:42

DVD Audio

tracks are in both DTS 96/24 and 24 bit/48 kHz Stereo format

1. "Earth Calling"
2. "Born to Go"
3. "Down Through the Night"
4. "The Awakening"
5. "Lord of Light"
6. "Black Corridor"
7. "Space Is Deep"
8. "Electronic No. 1"
9. "Orgone Accumulator"
10. "Upside Down"
11. "10 Seconds of Forever"
12. "Brainstorm"
13. "7 By 7"
14. "Sonic Attack"
15. "Time We Left This World Today"
16. "Master of the Universe"
17. "Welcome to the Future"
18. "You Shouldn't Do That"

== Personnel ==
=== Hawkwind ===
- Dave Brock – guitar; vocals (tracks 2, 3, 5, 7, 10, 13, 15)
- Nik Turner – saxophone, flute; vocals (tracks 2, 19, 20)
- Lemmy (Ian Kilmister) – bass guitar; vocals (tracks 6, 7, 13, 15)
- Dik Mik (Michael Davies) – audio generator, electronics
- Del Dettmar – synthesizer
- Simon King – drums
- Robert "Bob" Calvert – poetry, vocals ("poet and swazzle" on the album credits) (tracks 4, 6, 9, 11, 14)
- Stacia - dancer and visual artist

== Volume 2 ==
Space Ritual Volume 2

Live album by Hawkwind
- Released: May 1985
- Recorded: 22 December 1972
- Venue: Liverpool Stadium
- Genre: Space rock
- Label: American Phonograph – APK8

Hawkwind chronology
Bring Me the Head of Yuri Gagarin (1985)	Space Ritual Volume 2 (1985)	Hawkwind Anthology (1985)

Alternative cover
- Space Ritual Sundown V. 2 (2002 Remaster)

Professional ratings
Review scores
Source	Rating
The Encyclopedia of Popular Music	3/5 stars

Space Ritual Volume 2 is an archive live album by Hawkwind released in 1985 consisting of a live performance from 1972. The tapes were licensed by Dave Brock to former Hawkwind bass player Dave Anderson for release.

This recording is part of the performance that was processed for disc 2 of Space Ritual. Here it is in its original state, with no edits or overdubs, notable differences being a different middle section to "Orgone Accumulator", "Paranoia" included as the middle section of "Time We Left This World Today" and the end portion of "Brainstom" (Often mistakenly stated as "Wind of Change") leading into "7 By 7". "Space Is Deep" and "You Shouldn't Do That" / "Seeing It As You Really Are" from this tape were released on Hawkwind Anthology.

1. "Electronic No. 1" [listed as "Space"] (Dettmar/Dik Mik) – 2:15
2. "Orgone Accumulator" (Calvert/Brock) – 8:45
3. "Upside Down" (Brock) – 2:45
4. "Sonic Attack" (Moorcock) – 2:50
5. "Time We Left This World Today" (Brock) / "Paranoia" [unlisted] (Brock) – 13:20
6. "10 Seconds of Forever" (Calvert) – 2:10
7. "Brainstorm" (Turner) – 12:00
8. "7 By 7" (Brock) – 8:50
9. "Master of the Universe" (Turner/Brock) – 7:40
10. "Welcome to the Future" (Calvert) – 2:55
- see starfarer for full catalogue of releases, re-releases, retitles of this album.

== Space Ritual Live 2014 ==
Space Ritual Live 2014

Live album by Hawkwind
- Released: 30 March 2015
- Recorded: 22 February 2014
- Label: Gonzo Multi Media

Hawkwind chronology
Knights of Space (2008)	Space Ritual Live 2014 (2015)

On 22 February 2014, Hawkwind performed a one-off show at the Shepherd's Bush Empire, London in conjunction with Rock 4 Rescue in aid of various animal charities (Wet Nose Animal Aid, Animals Asia Foundation, Team Badger and Doris Banham Dog Rescue). The night consisted of two sets, the second being an almost entire run-through of the original Space Ritual album - "Electronic Number 1" being replaced by a new electronic instrumental piece titled "A Step into Space". The event was compered by TV presenter Matthew Wright, and the group were joined by former Soft Machine guitarist John Etheridge on "Down Through The Night" and "Space Is Deep", while "Sonic Attack" was recited from a pre-recording by Brian Blessed who had been involved in other Team Badger projects including the "Save the Badger Badger Badger" single with Brian May. Silver Machine was performed as the encore (unlike the original 1972/3 shows where "You Shouldn't do That" was the encore.) Paradoxically, the single of Silver Machine that helped to finance the original Space Ritual tour, but wasn't actually performed on that tour.

The recording was released by Gonzo Media on 30 March 2015 in three formats: 2CD, 2CD/DVD-Video (set 2), and 2CD/2DVD-Video (both sets).

=== Disc 1 ===
1. "Seasons" (Jonathan Hulme Derbyshire, Niall Hone, Richard Chadwick)
2. "Steppenwolf" (Robert Calvert, Dave Brock)
3. "Arrival in Utopia" [listed as "Utopia"] (Michael Moorcock, Brock)
4. "Opa Loka" (Alan Powell, Simon King)
5. "Spiral Galaxy" (Simon House)
6. "Reefer Madness" (Calvert, Brock)
7. "Sentinel" (Derbyshire, Hone, Chadwick, Tim Blake)
8. "Spirit of the Age" (Calvert, Brock)

=== Disc 2 ===
1. "Earth Calling"
2. "Born To Go"
3. "Down Through The Night"
4. "The Awakening" [listed as "First Landing on Medusa"]
5. "Lord of Light"
6. "The Black Corridor"
7. "Space is Deep"
8. "A Step into Space"
9. "Orgone Accumulator"
10. "Upside Down"
11. "The Tenth Second Forever"
12. "Brainstorm"
13. "Seven by Seven"
14. "Sonic Attack"
15. "Time We Left (This World Today)"
16. "Masters of the Universe"
17. "Welcome To The Future"
18. "Silver Machine"

=== Personnel ===
- Dave Brock - guitar, vocals and synth
- Mr Dibs - vocals, bass and fx
- Niall Hone - bass and vocals
- Tim Blake - keyboards, theremin
- Dead Fred/Frederick de la Mort (Philip Reeves) - keyboards, violin
- Richard Chadwick - drums
- John Etheridge - guitar ("Down Through The Night" and "Space Is Deep")
- Brian Blessed - vocals ("Sonic Attack")

== Charts ==
Chart (1973–1974)	Peak position
Australian Albums (Kent Music Report)	46
Finnish Albums (The Official Finnish Charts)	27
UK Albums (Official Charts)	9
US Billboard 200	179

Chart (2023)	Peak position
Scottish Albums (Official Charts)	22
UK Independent Albums (Official Charts)	11
UK Rock & Metal Albums (Official Charts)	4

== Certifications ==
Region	Certification	Certified units/sales
United Kingdom (BPI)	Gold	100,000^{^}
^{^} Shipments figures based on certification alone.

== Release history ==
- 30 March 2015 - 2CD, Gonzo Media, HAWKGZ102CD
- 30 March 2015 - 2CD/DVD, Gonzo Media, HAWKGZ103DVD
- 30 March 2015 - 2CD/2DVD, Gonzo Media, HAWKGZ104SE
