= Nik Turner =

English musician (1940–2022)

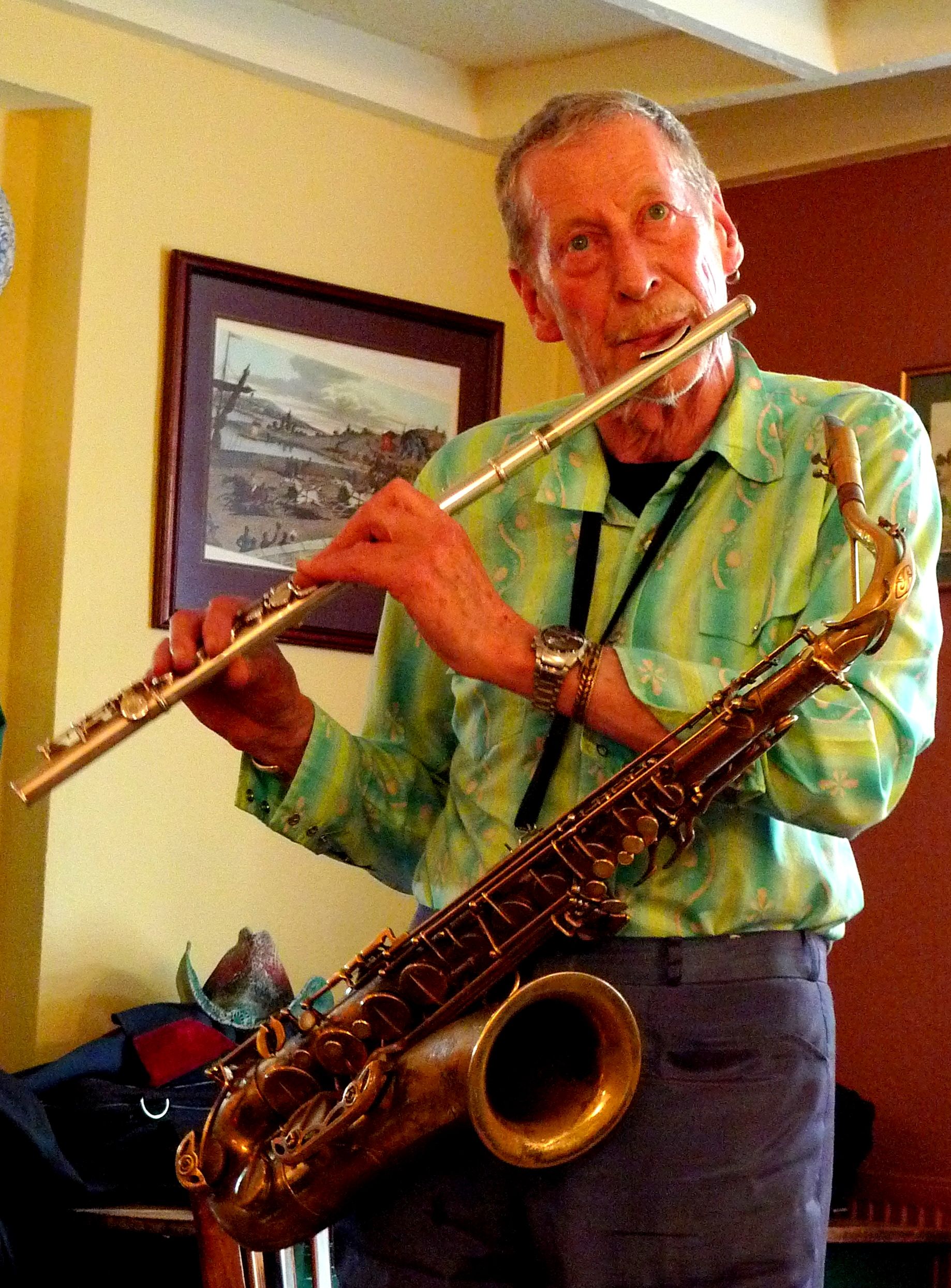
- Turner in 2010

Background information
- Also known as: Thunder Rider
- Born: Nicholas Robert Turner; 26 August 1940; Oxford, Oxfordshire, England
- Died: 10 November 2022 (aged 82) Pembrokeshire, Wales
- Genres: Space rock; jazz fusion
- Occupations: Musician; songwriter
- Instruments: Vocals; saxophone; flute
- Years active: 1969–2022
- Labels: Cleopatra; Charisma; Ozit
- Website: nikturner.com

Nicholas Robert Turner (26 August 1940 – 10 November 2022) was an English musician best known as a member of space rock pioneers Hawkwind. Turner played saxophone and flute, as well as being a vocalist and composer. While with Hawkwind, Turner was known for his experimental free jazz stylisations and outrageous stage presence, often donning full makeup and Ancient Egypt-inspired costumes.

== 1940–1969: Early years ==
Turner was born in Oxford in August 1940 to a theatrical family, although his father worked in a munitions factory to support them. At the age of 13, his family moved to the Kent seaside resort of Margate where he worked at the local funfair during the summer holiday season, befriending Robert Calvert, another seasonal worker. His first creative influences were rock and roll and films starring James Dean.

Turner went on to complete an engineering course and then undertook one voyage in the Merchant Navy. He then set about travelling around Europe picking up menial jobs, and it was during a stint as a roustabout in a travelling music circus in 1967 that he made the acquaintance of Dave Brock in Haarlem, the Netherlands.

Turner had two years of clarinet and saxophone lessons in the early 1960s but never considered himself good enough to pursue them seriously. Whilst travelling around Europe, he encountered some free jazz players in Berlin who impressed upon him the importance of expression over technical proficiency, and it was then that he decided that "[what he] wanted to do was play free jazz in a rock band".

== 1969–1976 and 1982–1984: Hawkwind ==
Turner, owning a van, had originally offered his services as a roadie to the newly formed Hawkwind. However, when the band discovered his passion for the saxophone he was offered a position in the band to add to the overall weirdness of their sound.

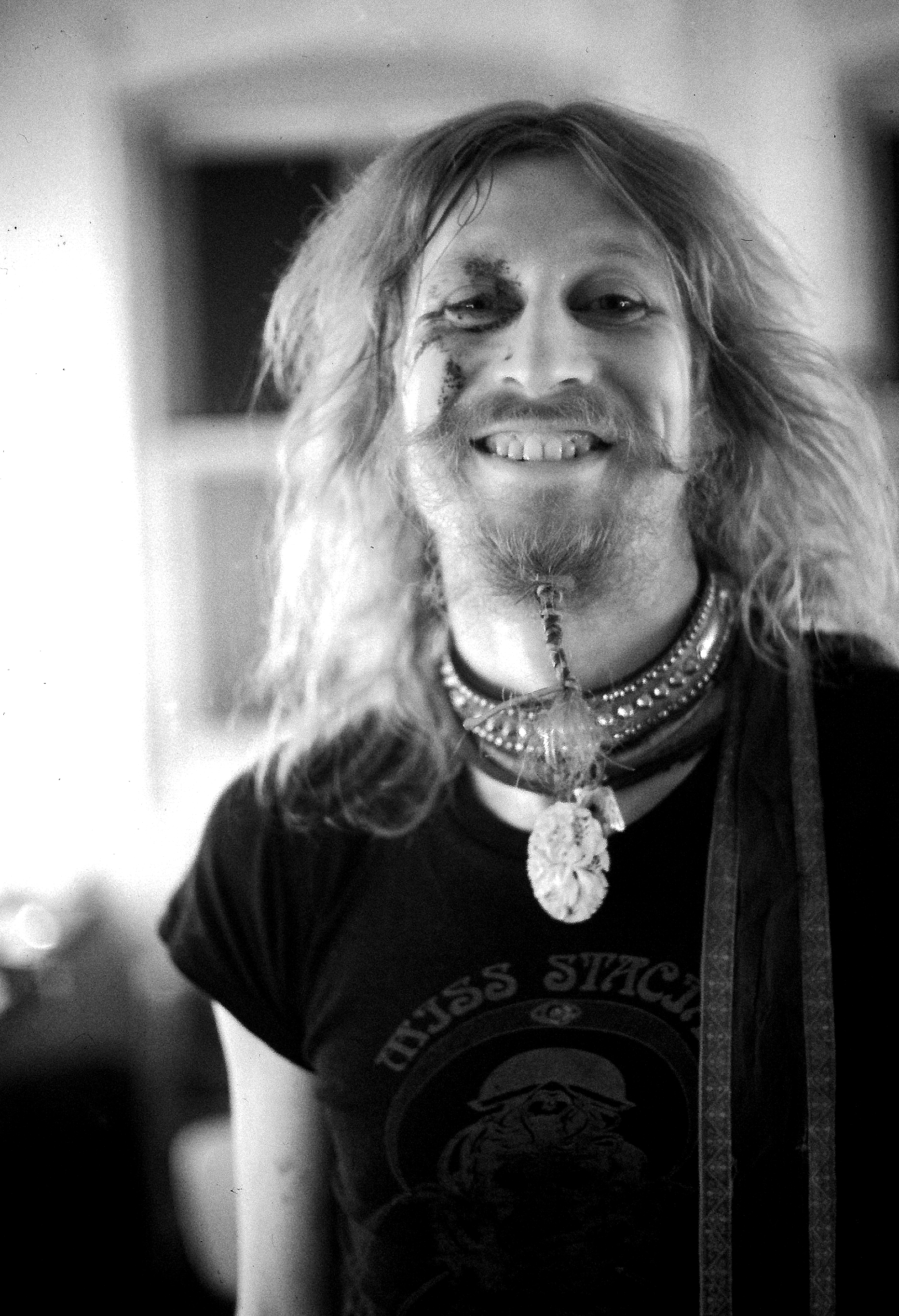
Nik Turner (1974)

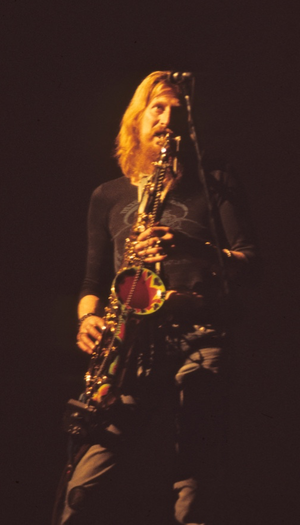
Nik Turner: Hawkwind Hall of the Mountain Grill tour 1974

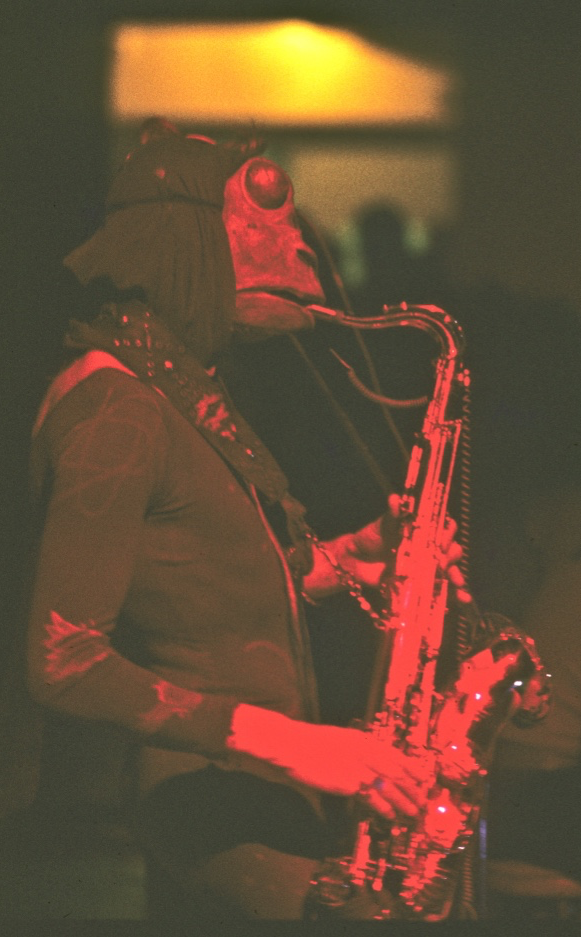
Nik Turner as Green Bug-Eyed Monster in 1974 Hall of the Mountain Grill tour

Of his playing, Turner admitted that "it's the overall feel rather than the individual parts of the music that we're interested in. I don't have any illusions about my technical ability. I tend to use it as an electronic medium rather than an instrument". He became an active and vocal member of the band, pulling in friends such as Dik Mik, Calvert and Barney Bubbles, and involving the band in community and charity projects, sometimes to the chagrin of the others.

We wanted to play the Windsor Sex Olympics but only half the band turned up.

NME – September 1972

Turner was a member of the band during their most commercially successful and critically acclaimed period, writing or co-writing some of their most popular songs such as "Brainstorm" and "Master of the Universe". However, complaints about his playing over other members of the band despite numerous requests to modify his behaviour eventually led to his dismissal in November 1976.

In 1982, during the recording of Choose Your Masques, Brock invited Turner to the recording sessions and he was asked to front the band for the album's tour. Turner's second stint in the band lasted just over 2 years, and although the band did not undertake any studio recording together, he was featured on live albums including Zones, This Is Hawkwind, Do Not Panic, as well as the band’s first released concert video, Night of the Hawks. At the end of 1984, while the band were preparing material for The Chronicle of the Black Sword album, he was dismissed once again.

== 1977–1986: Sphynx and Inner City Unit ==
After his first departure from Hawkwind, Turner holidayed in Egypt, and while visiting the Great Pyramid of Giza he was given three hours inside the King's Chamber to record some flute music, which was recorded without accompaniment. On returning to England, with the assistance of producer Steve Hillage of Gong, Turner assembled the Sphynx band featuring Hawkwind's Alan Powell, Gong's Mike Howlett and Tim Blake, and Harry Williamson to turn these tapes into an album by recording music augmenting the original flute tracks, with Turner adapting lyrics from the Egyptian Book of the Dead. The album was released as Xitintoday on Charisma Records in 1978 and the band toured, playing festivals including Deeply Vale Festivals (later released as a CD), Glastonbury Festival (part of which was broadcast on BBC television) and his own themed Bohemian Love-In all day festival at the Roundhouse.

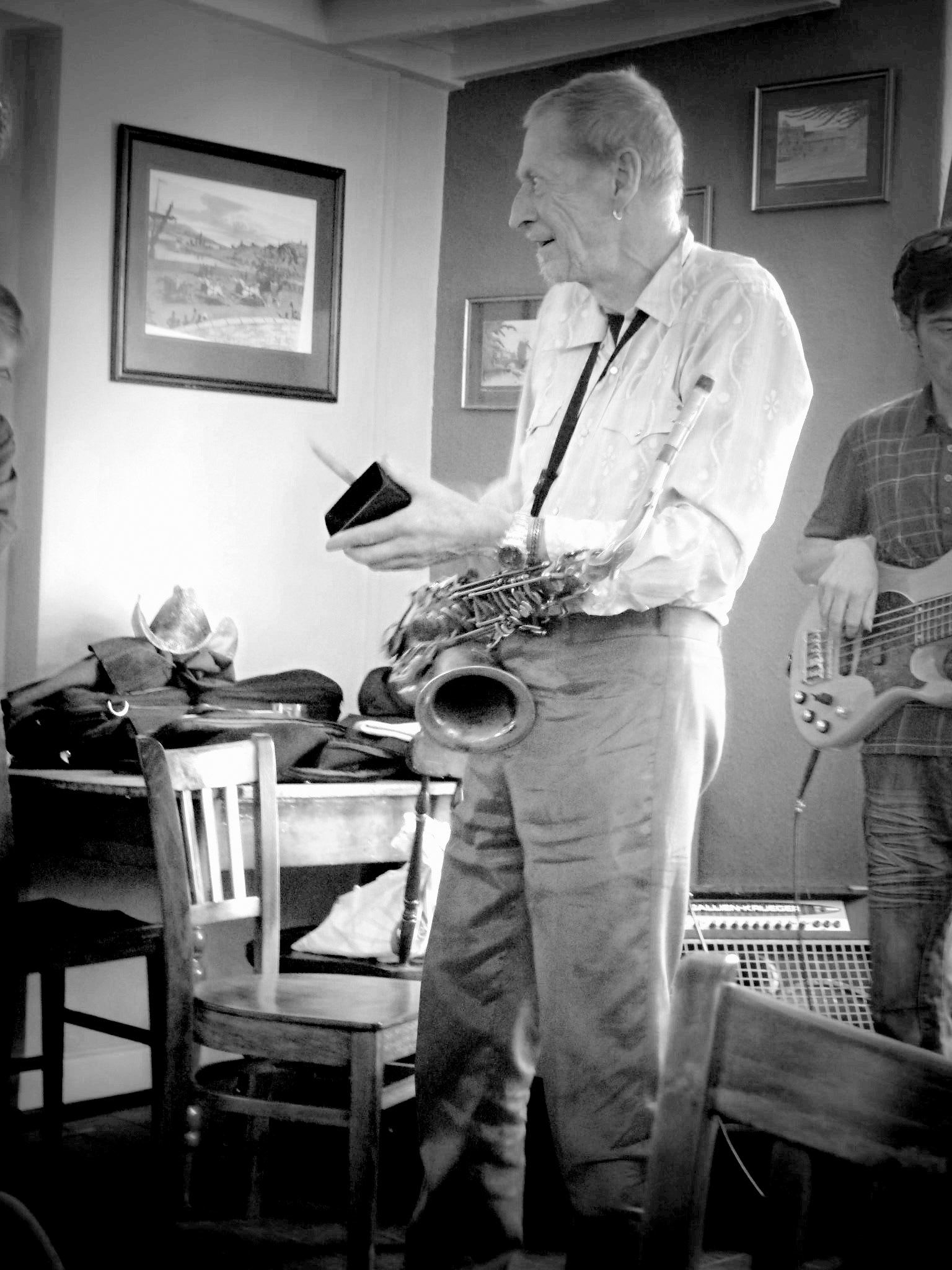
Nik Turner (2010)

With Williamson he conceived the "Nuclear Waste" single featuring many of the Sphynx musicians and a lead vocal by Sting. He then guested on the album Fairy Tales by Williamson and Gilli Smyth's project Mother Gong, and out of this he, Mo Vicarage and Ermanno Ghisio-Erba (a.k.a. Dino Ferari) formed Inner City Unit (ICU) with Trev Thoms and Dead Fred. Thoms and Ghisio-Erba had previously played together in Steve Took's Horns who had played their only gig at the Bohemian Love-In. The Horns were managed by Tony Landau, a friend of Turner's since adolescence, and were fronted by former Tyrannosaurus Rex percussionist Steve Peregrin Took, who would later make guest lead vocal appearances with ICU alongside his former Horns bandmates. Inner City Unit recorded the albums Pass Out and Maximum Effect before collapsing due to certain members' drug problems. Turner and Dead Fred had stints in Hawkwind before regrouping to release the albums New Anatomy, The President Tapes and the EP Blood and Bone.

== 1987–1999 ==
Turner's next project was Nik Turner's Fantastic All Stars, a saxophone and Hammond organ driven jazz and rhythm and blues band. They gigged for several years, eventually releasing the album Kubanno Kickasso!.

Turner and Twink got together for some impromptu live performances under the name Pinkwind, two CDs of which were released on Twink's own record label without the permission of Turner.

In 1993 Turner was approached by Pressurehed and Helios Creed to record another version of his Sphynx project using the original flute tracks, resulting in the album Sphynx. This partnership then developed further, regularly touring in the US performing a set of Hawkwind-centred material sometimes featuring Genesis P-Orridge, Jello Biafra and former Hawkwind members Simon House, Del Dettmar and Powell. One studio album Prophets of Time was released in 1994 followed by the live CD and DVD Space Ritual 1994 Live and another live CD Past or Future? in 1996. Out of this set of musicians formed the band Anubian Lights, centred on Len Del Rio and Tommy Greñas from Pressurehed with contributions from Turner, Dettmar and House, as did the band Spiral Realms centred on House and Rio.

== 2000–2022 ==
On 21 October 2000, at the Brixton Academy, a 'Hawkestra' event took place, featuring nearly all past members of Hawkwind. Disagreements between various participants led to any restaging of the event being unlikely, but Turner did stage a further event under the banner The Greasy Truckers Party featuring members of the Hawkestra' on 21 October 2001 at the London Astoria. Out of this a loose band formed, performing further gigs and eventually using the name xhawkwind.com. An appearance at Guilfest in 2002 led to confusion as to whether this actually was Hawkwind, sufficiently irking Brock into taking legal action to prohibit Turner from trading under the name Hawkwind, a case which Turner lost. The band settled on the name Space Ritual. Nik also made an impromptu appearance during the first Reggae Festival of Wales in 2003, joining the Goldmaster Allstars and Jamaican vocalist Alton Ellis.

Turner resurrected another version of Inner City Unit with Thoms, performing irregular gigs. He also fronted the "psychedelic latino-funk" band Galaktikos. He continued to attend festivals playing and guesting whenever possible and was an eager contributor to other band's projects, such as recording an album and touring with US space rockers Spaceseed in 2004, and live appearances with UK dance outfit Akahum at BGG Shareholders Party & HEADS Haiti Benefit show. Living in Carmarthen, he often busked playing his saxophone in Cardiff city centre during weekend nights.

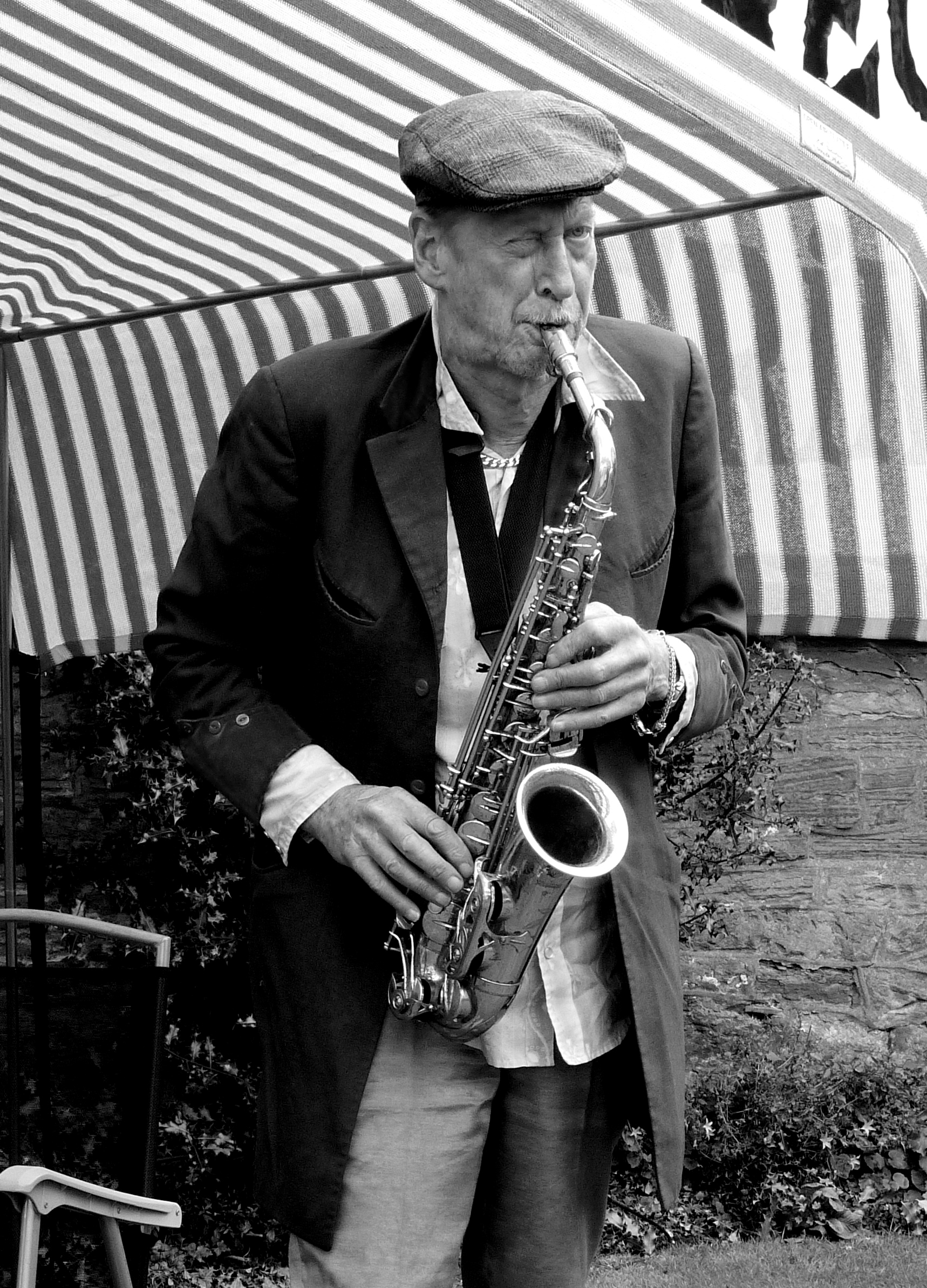
Nik Turner (2011)

After playing at "Hawkfan Festival" in Hamburg in 1997 and the Space and Rock Festival – Rocksjon, Jönköping, Sweden in 1998 with the Finnish space rock group Dark Sun, they moved to play at Tavastia Club, Helsinki, Finland. This resulted in the live album, Ice Ritual, which was released in 2000.

In 2008 Nik Turner was invited to Space Mirrors collective as a guest member. Since that time he recorded flute and saxophone on three Space Mirrors releases: Majestic-12: A Hidden Presence (2009), Dreams of Area 51 (2011) and In Darkness They Whisper (2012).

Turner also provided flute for Dodson and Fogg, a folk rock project released in 2012. After a chance meeting with Mr H, a Welsh jazz/blues singer-songwriter, at Brecon Jazz Festival in 2012, where Turner and Mr H performed a free improvised jazz session, Mr H invited Turner to feature on his fourth album, Poets, Balladeers and Cheats. In October 2012, Turner entered Berryhill Studios in Monmouthshire, and performed an improvised alto saxophone session on seven of Mr H's compositions, which were released in the spring of 2013.

In March 2013 Turner turned up at the SXSW Festival in Austin, Texas playing an official SXSW gig at Rebels Honky Tonk bar billed as Nik Turner (ex-Hawkwind) playing predominantly Space Ritual songs. He also guested on stage with The Soft Moon at Hotel Vegas the previous night. Turner also played saxophone and narrated "Brainstorm" on the Warfare album (2017 High Roller Records). In March 2019 he appeared in Austin, Texas, with ex-Hawkwind members Alan Powell and Michael Moorcock in an event called Hawkfest. At the Laugharne Weekend 2019, Damo Suzuki played the Fountain Inn with his all-star Sound Carriers which included Euros Childs and New Order drummer Stephen Morris. Nik Turner joined them at the end of their set.

== Personal life and death ==
Turner died on 10 November 2022, at the age of 82.

== Discography ==
=== As a member of Hawkwind ===
- 1970 – Hawkwind
- 1971 – In Search of Space
- 1972 – Doremi Fasol Latido
- 1973 – Space Ritual
- 1974 – Hall of the Mountain Grill
- 1975 – Warrior on the Edge of Time
- 1976 – Astounding Sounds, Amazing Music
- 1980 – Weird Tapes Volume 3 – live 1975–77
- 1981 – Weird Tapes Volume 5 – live 1976–77
- 1982 – Choose Your Masques – guests on "Void City" only
- 1982 – Weird Tapes Volume 6 – live 1970–73
- 1983 – Weird Tapes Volume 8 – live 1966–73
- 1983 – The Text of Festival – live 1970–1971
- 1983 – Zones – live 1980 and 1982
- 1984 – This Is Hawkwind, Do Not Panic – live 1980 and 1984
- 1984 – Bring Me the Head of Yuri Gagarin – live 1973
- 1984 – Space Ritual Volume 2 – live 1972
- 1987 – Out & Intake – outtakes and live 1982–1986
- 1991 – BBC Radio 1 Live in Concert – live 1972
- 1995 – Undisclosed Files Addendum – live 1984 and 1988
- 1997 – The 1999 Party – live 1974
- 1999 – Atomhenge 76 – live 1976
- 2000 – Choose Your Masques: Collectors Series Volume 2 – live 1982

=== Solo and collaborative projects ===
- 1978 – Nik Turner's Sphynx – Xitintoday (Charisma, CDS4011)
- 1982 – Ersatz - Imperial Pompadours – (Pompadour Records, POMP 001)
- 1993 – Sphynx (Cleopatra, CLEO21352)
- 1994 – Prophets of Time (Cleopatra, CLEO69082)
- 1995 – Space Ritual 1994 Live (Cleopatra, CLEO95062) and video-DVD (Cherry Red, CRDVD136) – live
- 1995 – Pinkwind – Festival of the Sun (Twink Records, TWK CD2) – live
- 1995 – Anubian Lights – Eternal Sky (Hypnotic, CLEO96032)
- 1996 – Hawkfairies – Purple Haze (Twink Records, TWK CD5) – live
- 1996 – Anubian Lights – The Jackal and Nine EP (Hypnotic, CLEO 9666-2)
- 1996 – Past or Future? (Cleopatra) – live
- 1997 – Sonic Attack 2001 (Dossier, 8480) – compilation album of Cleopatra material
- 1998 – Anubian Lights – Let Not The Flame Die Out (Hypnotic, CLP 0346-2)
- 2000 – Nik Turner's Sphynx – Live at Deeply Vale (Ozit/Morpheus) – live 1978
- 2001 – 2001 A Space Rock Odyssey – double live cd of the first two Space Ritual concerts (Ozit/Morpeus CD 0055)
- 2001 – Nik Turner's Fantastic All Stars – Kubanno Kickasso (Ozit/Morpheus, niktcd334)
- 2007 – Space Ritual – Otherworld (Esoteric Recordings, ECLEC2011)
- 2013 – Space Gypsy (Cleopatra)
- 2014 - Space Invaders & Nik Turner – Sonic Noise Opera (Nasoni Records)
- 2015 - Space Fusion Odyssey (Cleopatra)
- 2016 - Flame Tree Featuring Nik Turner (Purple Pyramid, a division of Cleopatra)
- 2017 - Life in Space (Cleopatra)
- 2018 - Nik Turner & Youth Pharaohs From Outer Space (Painted Word)
- 2019 - Final Frontier (Purple Pyramid)
- 2021 - Nik Turner I DO WHAT I LIKE (Sunshine Heart Records)
- 2022 - Nik Turner & The Trance Dimensionals "Synchronicity"(Black Widow Records, BWRCD 247-2)
- 2024 - Nik Turner & Youth "Interstellar Energy (Cadiz Music)

=== Guest appearances ===
- 1974 – Robert Calvert – Captain Lockheed and the Starfighters (United Artists, UAG 29507)
- 1975 – Robert Calvert – Lucky Leif and the Longships (United Artists, UAG 29852)
- 1975 – Michael Moorcock & Deep Fix – New Worlds Fair (United Artists, UAG 29732)
- 1979 – Mother Gong – Fairy Tales (Charly, CHRL 5018)
- 1981 – Robert Calvert – Hype (A-Side, IF 0311)
- 1981 – Mother Gong – Robot Woman
- 1981 – Sham 69 – The Game (Polydor, 5033)
- 1982 – Catherine Andrews – Fruits (Cat Tracks, PURRLP2)
- 1982 – The Astronauts – Peter Pan Hits The Suburbs (Genius)
- 1982 – Big Amongst Sheep – Terminal Velocity (Rock Solid)
- 1983 – Underground Zero – The Official Bootleg
- 1994 – Psychic TV – Pagan Day (Cleopatra)
- 1994 – Helios Creed – Busting Through the Van Allen Belt (Cleopatra, CLP 9465-2)
- 1995 – The Stranglers – The Stranglers & Friends Live in Concert – live 1980
- 1995 – Sting and the Radioactors – Nuclear Waste (Voiceprint, BP181CD) – recorded in 1978
- 1996 – The Moor – Flux (Bishop Garden Records, BGR 03.1996.01 RM)
- 1997 – Nigel Mazlyn Jones, Guy Evans and Nik Turner – Live (Blueprint, BP250CD) – live
- 1999 – Dark Sun – Ice Ritual (Burnt Hippie records, BHR-004)
- 1999 – 46000 Fibres – The 5th Anniversary Concerts: Set 3 (TRI 3/3)
- 2000 – Five Fifteen – Silver Machine (Bluelight Records)
- 2001 – Blue Horses – Ten Leagues Beyond World's End
- 2003 – The Jalapeños – Tear It Up (3D Discs 0002)
- 2004 – Spaceseed – Future Cities of the Past Part 1 (Project 9 Records)
- 2004 – Michael Moorcock and the Deep Fix – Rollercoaster Holiday (Voiceprint, VP351CD) – demos recorded in 1975
- 2005 – Muzak – Saturnia (Elektrohasch, ATHG-4127)
- 2009 – Space Mirrors – Majestic-12: A Hidden Presence (Sleaszy Rider, SR-0082)
- 2011 – Space Mirrors – Dreams of Area 51 vinyl split single w/Acid FM (Monsterfuzz, 002)
- 2012 – Space Mirrors – In Darkness They Whisper (Transubstans, TRANS097)
- 2012 – Dodson and Fogg – Dodson and Fogg (Wisdom Twins Records, WTR01)
- 2013 – Space Mirrors – The Other Gods (Transubstans, TRANS109)
- 2013 - Paradise 9 - "Take Me To The Future" (P9Recordings, P9CD0004)
- 2013 - The Sensible Gray Cells - A Postcard from Britain guest on "State of the Nation" and "Looking at You" (Easy Action, EARS051)
- 2014 - Sex Drugs and HIV - Sex Drugs and HIV guest on "Hashish" and "Tortured Genious" (Plastichead HIV2CD001)
- 2014 – Silverwing – Strange Daze Indeed (Audio-Nectar, ANSILVER-01)
- 2014 - Poets Balladeers and Cheats - Mr H (Barium Villa Records BV0006)
- 2014 - Sleepyard - Black Sails (Global Recording Artists, GRA 13442)
- 2015 – Space Mirrors – The Street Remains (Atomic Age, AAR15-04)
- 2015 – Space Mirrors – Stella Polaris (Atomic Age, AAR15-03)
- 2015 - Spirits Burning - Starhawk (Gonzo Multimedia, HST323CD)
- 2016 - Sendelica - I'll Walk With The Stars For You (Vincebus Eruptum, VELP013)
- 2016 - Spirits Burning & Clearlight - The Roadmap In Your Head (Gonzo Multimedia, HST423CD)
- 2017 - Eco - Warfare saxophone and voice on Doctor Of Insanity [High Roller Records]
- 2022 - Spirits Burning Recollections Of Instrumentals (Purple Pyramid, CLO 3657)

=== Various artists ===
- 1983 – " Field Marshal Slug; Punk Sax Live Genius. – Live.
- 1985 – Hawkwind, Friends and Relations Volume 2 – "The Man with the Golden Arm"
- 1995 – Saucerful of Pink: A Tribute to Pink Floyd – "Careful With That Axe Eugene"
- 2017 – All Of Us Pilgrims - A tribute to music of Peter Hammill & Van Der Graaf Generator by musicians from The Top Of The World Club Facebook Group – "Pilgrims"
- 2020 - Sex Drugs and HIV - The Studio Sessions DVD featuring on "Hashish" and "Tortured Genious" (Plastichead)
- 2022 – Flipside Freaks Purple – "Purse" by Spirits Burning (Flicknife SHARP CD22124)
