= Del Dettmar =

English musician

- Born: 20 April 1947 (age 77); Thornton Heath, Surrey, England, United Kingdom
- Genres: Space rock
- Instrument: Keyboards
- Formerly of: Hawkwind

Del Dettmar (born 20 April 1947 in Thornton Heath, Surrey, England) is an English musician, best known as synthesizer and keyboard player with English space rock band Hawkwind from 1971 to 1974.

After leaving school he had a number of jobs including working in a bank, digging potatoes on Jersey, and punting tourists up and down the river in Cambridge. Eventually he got a job as roadie with The Pretty Things and subsequently worked as road manager for Edgar Broughton Band, Arthur Brown, Juicy Lucy, Pete Brown, and then Cochise.

He was recruited as road manager for Hawkwind by their manager Doug Smith. While attending to his road manager duties, he also sat out front at gigs operating a synthesizer and mixing the band. He was brought into the band proper to replace a temporarily absent Dik Mik in May 1971. He co-produced (with Dave Brock) the album Doremi Fasol Latido and is credited as composer of the tracks "One Change" (Doremi Fasol Latido), "Electronic No. 1" (Space Ritual), and "Goat Willow" (Hall of the Mountain Grill).

He left Hawkwind in June 1974 to emigrate to the East Shore of Kootenay Lake, in B.C. Canada, where he still lives. He recorded two albums with the Vancouver-based experimental group Melodic Energy Commission in 1979 and 1980 (with help from fellow ex-Hawkwinder Paul Rudolph). He is an occasional contributor to the band Space Ritual.
