= Who's Gonna Win the War? =

1980 song by Hawkwind

"Who's Gonna Win The War?"

Single by Hawkwind

from the album Levitation
- B-side: "Nuclear Toy"
- Released: 7 November 1980
- Recorded: Roundhouse Studios, Summer 1980
- Genre: Space rock
- Label: Bronze Records - BRO109
- Songwriter: Dave Brock
- Producers: Ashley Howe and Hawkwind

Hawkwind singles chronology
| "Shot Down in the Night" (1980) | "Who's Gonna Win The War?" (1980) | "Angels of Death" (1981) |

"Who's Gonna Win the War?"

Single by Hawklords
- B-side: "Time of the Hawklords"
- Released: 2 July 1983
- Recorded: Rockfield Studios, 1979
- Genre: Space rock
- Label: Flicknife Records - FLS209
- Songwriter: Dave Brock
- Producer: Hawklords

Hawklords singles chronology
| ""Sonic Assassins" EP" (1981) | "Who's Gonna Win the War?" (1983) | ""Motorway City" (live)" (1983) |

"Who's Gonna Win The War?" is a 1980 song by the UK rock group Hawkwind. It was released as a single in the UK (BRO109) on 7 November 1980, being an edit of the version on the album Levitation.

Bronze changed their manufacturers and distributors during the single release from EMI (which had a cream paper label depicting the evolving man logo) to Polydor Records (which had a lime green plastic label). The single was the first for which the band recorded a promotional video, as Dave Brock explains:

We'd never done a video before, miming and all that. The first take was all right, but by the time we were doing the third it was difficult to be serious.

The band also made a rare television appearance, albeit on German music show Musikladen on 14 February 1981 at Baden-Baden, playing a live version of this song and "Motorway City", featuring Tim Blake replacement Keith Hale on Hammond organ. Also appearing on the show was Alexis Korner with Jack Bruce, this being the first time Hawkwind's drummer Ginger Baker spoke to the bassist since their acrimonious split in Cream.

"Who's Gonna Win the War?" was soon dropped from the live set, its last appearance at the Glastonbury Festival in 1981 was released on the Hawkwind Anthology compilation album.

== Hawklords Demo ==
The original demo version recorded by the Hawklords at Rockfield Studios in 1979 received a release on Flicknife Records in 1983. It was backed by "Time of the Hawklords", another demo from the same session. This demo version also appeared on Weird Tape 1 and Hawkwind, Friends and Relations Volume 1.
