= The 1999 Party =

The '1999' Party

Live album by Hawkwind
- Released: November, 1997 – HAWKS6
- Recorded: Chicago Auditorium Theatre, USA, 21 March 1974
- Genre: Space rock
- Label: EMI

Hawkwind chronology
Undisclosed Files Addendum (1995)	The '1999' Party (1997)	Glastonbury 90 (1999)

Professional ratings
Review scores
Source	Rating
The Encyclopedia of Popular Music	3/5 stars

The '1999' Party is a live album by Hawkwind recorded at the Chicago Auditorium Theatre on 21 March 1974 released retrospectively in November 1997 by EMI. It was issued for the first time as part of EMI's re-releasing re-mastered versions of the Hawkwind back catalogue. A further budget single disk derived from this set titled Hawkwind Live 74 was issued in April 2006.

== Band changes ==
Hawkwind first toured North America in November and December 1973 undertaking 10 dates performing the Space Ritual set, albeit without Robert Calvert and Dik Mik who had left in July. On that tour Del Dettmar had bought land in Canada with the intention of emigrating, but remained with the band playing from the mixing desk rather than the stage until eventually leaving in June 1974. Simon House, who had known the band from his time with High Tide, was brought in playing alongside Dettmar and accompanied the band on this tour but, not being able to get the correct work permit in time, his participation was strictly unofficial.

== The tour ==
Despite bad reviews, low album sales, lack of promotion and interest from their US record company, Hawkwind self-financed this North America tour safe in the knowledge that they could fill halls. Under the banner The 1999 Party, it ran from March through April 1974 and included the full stage show featuring DJ Andy Dunkley, dancer Stacia and light show by Liquid Len, with a one-hour slot for the support band Man.

- 1 March: Los Angeles
- 2 March: Santa Monica, Auditorium
- 3 March: San Diego, JJ Club
- 7 March: San Francisco, Auditorium
- 10 March: Berkeley, University
- 15 March: Kansas City, Soldiers & Sailors
- 16 March: St. Louis, Auditorium
- 19 March: Milwaukee, Riverside Theatre
- 21 March: Chicago, Auditorium Theatre
- 22 March: Cleveland, Allen Theatre
- 23 March: Detroit, Palace
- 24 March: South Bend, Morris Auditorium
- 29 March: Atlanta, Electric Ballroom
- 2 April: Nashville
- 5 April: Philadelphia, Tower Theatre
- 6 April: New York, Steins Academy
- 7 April: Baltimore, Latin Casino
- 8 April: Boston, Orpheum Auditorium
- 10 April: Buffalo
- 13 April: Washington, Warner Theatre
- 14 April: Montreal
- 15 April: Toronto, Massey Hall

The Berkeley date was in benefit of Timothy Leary who had been imprisoned after being extradited from Afghanistan for his use and promotion of drugs. A phone call from his cell was broadcast over the PA interrupting the Man set. At the Nashville date "their equipment sustained damage estimated at nearly £1000 when the roof was ripped from the Nashville Hotel" by a tornado; Both the Chicago and Detroit shows were recorded.

When the band next returned to the USA in September, five dates in after the Hammond, Indiana show the Internal Revenue Service impounded the band's equipment in lieu of an outstanding $8000 tax bill from this tour, prohibiting the band from continuing. Once the legal situation was sorted, the tour was rescheduled for a month later.

== The set ==
The set was revamped from the Space Ritual set, with only three poems and three songs remaining. Two Michael Moorcock poems based on his Eternal Champion theme, which would later be used for Warrior on the Edge of Time, are worked into the set and there are five new tracks which would later be recorded for Hall of the Mountain Grill album.

The Man set also received a retrospective release in June 2001 as The 1999 Party Tour (Voiceprint).

== Track listing ==
=== Disc 1 ===
1. "Intro" (Andy Dunkley) / "Standing On The Edge" (Michael Moorcock) – 4:16
2. "Brainbox Pollution" (Dave Brock) – 7:52
3. "It's So Easy" (Brock) – 11:02
4. "You Know You're Only Dreaming" (Brock) – 4:43
5. "Veterans of a Thousand Psychic Wars" (Moorcock) – 2:21
6. "Brainstorm" (Nik Turner) – 9:19
7. "Seven By Seven" (Brock) – 9:26

=== Disc 2 ===
1. "The Watcher" (Ian Kilmister) – 6:40
2. "The Awakening" (Robert Calvert) – 2:40
3. "Paradox" (Brock) – 5:43
4. "You'd Better Believe It" (Brock) – 8:09
5. "Psychedelic Warlords" (Brock) – 3:47
6. "D-Rider" (Turner) – 7:46
7. "Sonic Attack" (Moorcock) – 4:30
8. "Master Of The Universe" (Turner/Brock) – 6:57
9. "Welcome To The Future" (Calvert) – 2:32

=== Hawkwind Live 74 ===
1. "Brainbox Pollution"
2. "You Know You're Only Dreaming"
3. "Brainstorm"
4. "Seven By Seven"
5. "You'd Better Believe It"
6. "The Psychedelic Warlords (Disappear In Smoke)"
7. "D-Rider"
8. "Master Of The Universe"
9. "Welcome To The Future"

== Personnel ==
- Dave Brock – Electric guitar, Vocals
- Nik Turner – Saxophone, Flute, Vocals
- Lemmy (Ian Kilmister) – Bass guitar, Vocals
- Del Dettmar – Synthesizer
- Simon House – Violin, Keyboards
- Simon King – Drums
