= Astounding Sounds, Amazing Music =

Studio album by Hawkwind
- Released: 27 August 1976
- Recorded: February–March 1976
- Studios: Roundhouse, London
- Genres: Space rock; progressive rock; hard rock
- Length: 38:31
- Label: Charisma
- Producers: Hawkwind, recorded by Mark Dearnley.

Hawkwind chronology
| Warrior on the Edge of Time (1975) | Astounding Sounds, Amazing Music (1976) | Quark, Strangeness and Charm (1977) |

Singles from Astounding Sounds, Amazing Music
- 1. "Kerb Crawler" Released: 16 July 1976

Astounding Sounds, Amazing Music is the sixth studio album by the British rock band Hawkwind, released in 1976. It reached No. 33 on the UK album charts.

The title makes references to old science fiction magazines (Astounding and Amazing Stories), the concept being that each piece of music (and its title) would be interpreted as an individual science fiction story. The record cover is a parody of the cover of these magazines, while the inner sleeve carried small ads, with each band member having their own product (e.g. Dr Brock's cure for piles, Paul Rudolph's Manly Strapon, and Simon King's Pleasure Primer). The cover was double-sided, one side illustrated by Calvert's childhood friend Tony Hyde, the other by Barney Bubbles signed as Grove Lane, with initial print-runs having either as the front cover. Bubbles original design was to have been Steppenwolf looming over the city.

This album marked the start of a new era for Hawkwind, having left the management of Douglas Smith for Tony Howard and changed record companies from United Artists Records to Charisma Records. Musically, the dirty heavy metal lead bass guitar playing of Lemmy was replaced by the cleaner, formally trained bass playing of Paul Rudolph, formerly of the Pink Fairies. All members of the band were now contributing to the writing and arrangement of the music leading to more width in style, and the recording and production is better defined than previous albums.

The greatest change is in the return of Robert Calvert, this time as a permanent vocalist rather than the peripheral poet role he occupied on Space Ritual. Not only did he bring crafted lyrics to the band, but he was intent on turning live shows into a piece of music theatre with specific characters for him to act out, Calvert explaining in a 1976 interview that "We're writing numbers now with visual ideas in mind, rather than trying to think of things to impose on numbers we've already got. We're trying to get the visual side of the band focussed on individuals rather than on screen projections. Nik, Dave and myself are, in some parts of the show, playing the parts of actors... All in all, it works up to quite a nice piece of theatre, spontaneous theatre that is."

The group performed at Cardiff Castle on 24 July as "special guests" to Status Quo, featuring also Strawbs, Curved Air, Budgie and MC John Peel. They promoted the album with a 17-date British tour from 15 September through to 5 October, with support from Tiger featuring Nicky Moore and Big Jim Sullivan, and the Atomhenge stage set designed by Larry Smart of Exploding Galaxy. Soundboard recording from these concerts have been issued on Weird Tape Volume 5 (1982) and Atomhenge 76/Thrilling Hawkwind Adventures (2000). After the tour, the group dismissed Turner and Powell, recorded the single "Back on the Streets" and then undertook another 8 date tour in December.

== Songs ==
"Reefer Madness" lyrics are inspired by the 1936 anti-marijuana propaganda film Reefer Madness. It was performed during the tour of the album, appearing on the live album Atomhenge 76, and remained in the set until the formation of the Hawklords in 1978. The song was added to the setlist in 1990/1 to be performed by Bridget Wishart, a version appearing on the live album California Brainstorm.

Calvert had written the lyrics to "Steppenwolf" when Adrian Wagner, for his album Distances Between Us, "wanted a song about living in cities and I was re-reading Hesse's Steppenwolf at the time. It seemed to me that there was a strong myth in it about city life and it gave me the basic idea." It was performed during the tour of the album, appearing on the live album Atomhenge 76, and remained in the band's set until Calvert left in 1978, versions included on Weird Tape 4 and 5. The song has occasionally been re-instated into the live set, between 1982 and 1984 it was performed by Turner, in 1996 by Ron Tree, in 2003 by Arthur Brown and in 2017 by Mr Dibs during the Into The Woods tour.

"City of Lagoons" is a Powell composed instrumental, although erroneously credited to House on the album's release.

"The Aubergine That Ate Rangoon" is an instrumental, its title references Dr. West's Medicine Show and Junk Band's 1967 hit single "The Eggplant That Ate Chicago".

"Kerb Crawler" was released as a single backed by "Honky Dorky" which is the band jamming on "Reefer Madness". There are reportedly two versions of the A-side, the original and a re-mix by Pink Floyd's David Gilmour – it is the latter that appeared on the album.

"Kadu Flyer" lyrics were written by Turner, who credited them to Jamie Mandelkau for legal reasons (Turner was still under contract either to United Artists or Douglas Smith). Calvert is also given a writers credit on some releases. Kadu is an abbreviation of Kathmandu.

"Chronoglide Skyway" is a House composed psychedelic instrumental, featuring saxophone and guitar solos, although erroneously credited to Powell on the album's release. It was performed during the tour of the album, appearing on the live album Atomhenge 76.

== Critical reception ==
Professional ratings
Review scores
| Source | Rating |
|---|---|
| AllMusic | 2/5 stars |
| The Encyclopedia of Popular Music | 3/5 stars |

The NME journalist Dick Tracy (a pseudonym of John May) reviewed the album as "Hawkwind are back on form... their music has acquired about fifteen new levels since the old churn-churn days". He highlights "Reefer Madness" as the "stand-out" track and notes that "Simon House has injected a big shot of tuneful keyboarding into the mix".

== Track listing ==
Side one
| No. | Title | Writer(s) | Length |
|---|---|---|---|
| 1. | "Reefer Madness" | Robert Calvert, Dave Brock | 6:03 |
| 2. | "Steppenwolf" | Calvert, Brock | 9:46 |
| 3. | "City of Lagoons" | Alan Powell | 5:09 |

Side two
| No. | Title | Writer(s) | Length |
|---|---|---|---|
| 4. | "The Aubergine That Ate Rangoon" | Paul Rudolph | 3:37 |
| 5. | "Kerb Crawler" | Calvert, Brock | 3:45 |
| 6. | "Kadu Flyer" | Nik Turner, Simon House | 5:07 |
| 7. | "Chronoglide Skyway" | House | 5:04 |
| Total length: | | | 38:31 |

Griffin CD bonus tracks
| No. | Title | Writer(s) | Length |
|---|---|---|---|
| 8. | "Honky Dorky" | Hawkwind | 3:16 |
| 9. | "Back on the Streets" | Calvert, Rudolph | 2:56 |
| 10. | "Dream of Isis" | Brock, House, Simon King | 2:52 |
| Total length: | | | 47:33 |

Atomhenge CD bonus tracks
| No. | Title | Writer(s) | Length |
|---|---|---|---|
| 8. | "Honky Dorky" | Hawkwind | 3:16 |
| 9. | "Kerb Crawler" (single mix) | Calvert, Brock | 3:45 |
| 10. | "Back on the Streets" (alternative mix) | Calvert, Rudolph | 3:07 |
| 11. | "Dream of Isis" (alternative mix) | Brock, House, King | 2:57 |

== Personnel ==
Hawkwind

- Robert Calvert – vocals
- Dave Brock – electric guitar, keyboards, backing vocals
- Nik Turner – saxophone, flute, vocals (on "Kadu Flyer")
- Paul Rudolph – bass guitar, electric guitar
- Simon House – violin, keyboards, mellotron, sitar (on "Kadu Flyer")
- Simon King – drums
- Alan Powell – drums

== Credits ==
- Recorded at Roundhouse Recording Studios, February to March 1976.
- Produced by Hawkwind, recorded by Mark Dearnley.
- "Kerb Crawler" remixed by David Gilmour (as Dave Gilmour).
- Cover by Tony Hyde and Barney Bubbles.

== Charts ==
| Chart (1976) | Peak position |
|---|---|
| UK Albums (Official Charts) | 33 |

== Release history ==
- August 1976: Charisma, CDS4004, UK vinyl – some copies were printed with the front and back cover reversed. Original copies contained an inner sleeve.
- August 1976: Charisma, 9211–4004, Canada – disc label says "Amazing Music, Astounding Sounds"
- March 1983: Charisma, CHC14, UK vinyl
- April 1989: Virgin, CDSCD 4004, UK CD
- August 1995: Griffin Music, GCD483-2, USA CD; GCD345-0, USA CD with the Michael Butterworth The Time of the Hawklords book.
- 2005: Sunrise Records, LC12774, USA CD
- January 2009: Atomhenge (Cherry Red) Records, ATOMCD1005, UK CD
