= Quark, Strangeness and Charm (song) =

Single by Hawkwind

from the album Quark, Strangeness and Charm
- B-side: "The Forge of Vulcan"
- Released: 29 July 1977
- Recorded: Rockfield Studios, February 1977
- Genre: Space rock
- Length: 3:06
- Label: Charisma Records
- Songwriter: Robert Calvert/Dave Brock
- Producer: Hawkwind

Hawkwind singles chronology
"Back on the Streets" (1977)	"Quark, Strangeness and Charm" (1977)	"Psi Power" (1978)

"Quark, Strangeness and Charm" is a 1977 song by the UK rock group Hawkwind, being the title track from the Quark, Strangeness and Charm album.

The title references quarks which are sub-atomic particles; "strangeness" and "charm" are playful terms used by physicists to refer to how many strange and charm quarks are within a particle. The lyrics take a humorous look at certain famous physicists' romantic failures.

== 1977 single ==
It was released as a single in the UK (CB305) on 29 July 1977, being a slightly different version to the one on the album. Some European copies had a different B-side, such as Germany, which featured "The Iron Dream" instead. The single version was subsequently included on the 1980 Repeat Performance compilation album.

At the time Hawkwind shared the same management as Marc Bolan and so were given a slot on the Marc Granada Television programme to promote it. Dave Brock declined to appear, either being unwilling to drive to Manchester for the filming or holding a long time grudge against Bolan. For the pre-recording of the music on this show, Adrian Shaw played guitar while Robert Calvert mimed playing guitar during the filming.

=== Track listing ===
1. "Quark, Strangeness and Charm" (Calvert/Brock) – 3:06
2. "The Forge of Vulcan" (House) – 3:05

=== Personnel ===
- Robert Calvert – vocal, percussion
- Dave Brock – electric lead and rhythm guitars
- Simon House – acoustic and electric pianos
- Adrian Shaw – bass guitar
- Simon King – drums

=== Credits ===
- Recorded at Rockfield Studios, February 1977
- Produced by Hawkwind
- Engineered by Dave Charles

== Live versions ==
The song only briefly featured in Hawkwind's live set in 1977 with one recording surviving, released on both the Hawkwind Anthology and Weird Tape Volume 2 albums. It was briefly resurrected at the end of 1993 for the tour of the It Is the Business of the Future to Be Dangerous album and remained until the end of 1994.

== 1994 EP ==
Quark, Strangeness and Charm

EP by Hawkwind
- Released: September 1994
- Recorded: 1994
- Genre: Space rock
- Label: Emergency Broadcast System Records
- Producer: Hawkwind

Hawkwind EPs chronology
Decide Your Future EP (1993)	Quark, Strangeness and Charm (1994)	Area S4 EP (1995)

In 1994, Hawkwind recorded a new version of the song with significant rewriting of the music. This version was also included on the album The Business Trip.

=== Track listing ===
1. "Uncle Sam's on Mars" (Red Planet Radio Mix) – 2:43
2. "Quark, Strangeness and Charm" (Calvert/Brock) – 6:24
3. "Black Sun" – 9:34
4. "Uncle Sam's on Mars" (Martian Conquest Mix) – 6:53

=== Personnel ===
- Dave Brock – guitar, vocals, keyboards, synthesisers
- Alan Davey – bass guitar, vocals, synthesisers
- Richard Chadwick – drums, percussion
- Astralasia – remixes

=== Release history ===
- Sep 1994 – UK – Emergency Broadcast System Records – 12" vinyl (EBT 110) and CD (EBCD 110)
- Nov 1994 – USA – Griffin – CD (GCD 312-2)

== Other versions ==
A new acoustic version of "Quark, Strangeness and Charm" was included on The Road to Utopia (2018), produced and arranged by Mike Batt with additional orchestrations.

== Cover versions ==
The Stranglers' Jean-Jacques Burnel has long been an admirer of the song, stating it was "a song I'd really fucking wish I'd written". He has performed versions of the song with Three Men and Black. Northampton band Subfriction released a modernised speeded up version of the song in 2025.
