= Atomhenge 76 =

Live album by Hawkwind
- Released: 16 October 2000
- Recorded: 27 September 1976
- Venue: Colston Hall, Bristol
- Genre: Space rock
- Label: Voiceprint Records – HAWKVP5CD

Hawkwind chronology
Complete '79: Collectors Series Volume 1 (1999)	Atomhenge 76 (2000)	Live 1990 (2002)

Thrilling Hawkwind Adventures
- North America (Griffin, 2000)

Professional ratings
Review scores
Source	Rating
Allmusic	2.5/5 stars
The Encyclopedia of Popular Music	2/5 stars

Atomhenge 76 is a 2000 live album release of part of a 1976 concert by Hawkwind.

Part of this set was previously issued in North America on a single CD as Thrilling Hawkwind Adventures (Griffin Music, November–1999, GCD8402).

== Track listing ==
CD1

1. "Intro" (Hawkwind) – 1:18
2. "Reefer Madness" (Calvert, Brock) – 6:05
3. "Paradox" (Brock) – 4:23
4. "Chronoglide Skyway" (House) – 5:56
5. "Hassan-i-Sabah" [aka "Assassins of Allah"] (Calvert, Rudolph) – 5:56
6. "Brainstorm" (Turner) – 8:53
7. "Wind of Change" (Brock) – 4:09

CD2

1. "Instrumental" (Hawkwind) – 1:15
2. "Steppenwolf" (Calvert, Brock) – 11:14
3. "Uncle Sam's on Mars" (Calvert, Powell, King) – 7:36
4. "Time For Sale" (Calvert, Rudolph) – 10:38
5. "Back on the Streets" (Calvert, Rudolph) – 5:16
6. "Sonic Attack" (Michael Moorcock, Hawkwind) – 6:27
7. "Kerb Crawler" (Calvert, Brock) – 5:34

Thrilling Hawkwind Adventures version

1. "Brainstorm" (Turner) – 9:23
2. "Wind of Change" (Brock) – 4:31
3. "Steppenwolf" (Calvert, Brock) – 11:17
4. "Uncle Sam's on Mars" (Calvert, Powell, King) – 6:56
5. "Time for Sale" (Calvert, Rudolph) – 10:13
6. "Back on the Streets" (Calvert, Rudolph) – 4:40
7. "Sonic Attack" (Moorcock, Hawkwind) – 6:01

== Personnel ==
Hawkwind

- Robert Calvert – vocals
- Dave Brock – guitar, vocals
- Nik Turner – saxophone, flute, vocals
- Paul Rudolph – bass guitar, guitar
- Simon House – violin, keyboards
- Simon King – drums
- Alan Powell – drums
