= Choose Your Masques =

Studio album by Hawkwind
- Released: 29 October 1982
- Recorded: June–July 1982
- Studio: Rockfield Studios, Wales
- Genre: Space rock
- Length: 43:57
- Label: RCA/Active
- Producer: Hawkwind and Pat Moran

Hawkwind chronology
Church of Hawkwind (1982)	Choose Your Masques (1982)	Zones (1983)

Professional ratings
Review scores
Source	Rating
Allmusic	3/5 stars
The Encyclopedia of Popular Music	3/5 stars

Choose Your Masques is the thirteenth studio album by the English space rock group Hawkwind, released in 1982. It spent five weeks on the UK Albums Chart, peaking at No. 29.

The group's line-up for this album remained unchanged from the previous Church of Hawkwind album, although for this recording the group started to heavily use drum machines and drum loops, with most of Griffin's contributions being relegated to disjointed drum fills. Griffin was unhappy with this role, and group-leader Dave Brock was dissatisfied with Griffin's timekeeping, so they mutually agreed to part company, although Griffin reluctantly agreed to fulfil the scheduled tour commitments.

The album was recorded in June and July 1982 at Rockfield Studios. Science fiction author Michael Moorcock contributed lyrics to the album, but credited his wife Lynda Steele in order to bypass his music publisher Douglas Smith with whom he was in dispute. The lyrics to "Fahrenheit 451", which had been written by former lead singer Robert Calvert and originally recorded but unused in 1978, were based on Ray Bradbury's book Fahrenheit 451.

The album makes use of samples, featuring Ian Holm from a 1981 BBC Radio 4 serialisation of The Lord of the Rings on "Dream Worker", and the spoken introduction of The Outer Limits on "Void City". "Silver Machine" and "Psychedelic Warlords" are re-recordings of the early 1970s singles which were not originally intended for inclusion on the album.

The group undertook a 29-date UK tour in November and December to promote the album, with support from the Spanish rock group Barón Rojo. Saxophonist and singer Nik Turner rejoined the group for this tour. Recordings from this tour have been issued on the albums Zones (1983), Out & Intake (1987) and Choose Your Masques: Collectors Series Volume 2 (1999). A full double album recorded on the tour was finally released in 2016 as Coded Languages.

== Track listing ==
=== Side 1 ===
1. "Choose Your Masks" (Michael Moorcock, Dave Brock) – 5:28
2. "Dream Worker" (Harvey Bainbridge) – 4:58
3. "Arrival in Utopia" (Moorcock, Brock) – 5:47
4. "Utopia" (Brock) – 3:00

=== Side 2 ===
5. "Silver Machine" (Robert Calvert, Brock) – 4:22
6. "Void City" (Bainbridge, Brock) – 6:48
7. "Solitary Mind Games" (Marion Lloyd-Langton, Huw Lloyd-Langton) – 3:58
8. "Fahrenheit 451" (Calvert, Brock) – 4:48
9. "The Scan" (Bainbridge, Brock) – 1:02
10. "Waiting for Tomorrow" (H. Lloyd-Langton, M. Lloyd-Langton) – 3:46

=== EBS/Griffin bonus tracks ===
11. "Silver Machine" (Calvert, Brock) – 7:25
12. "Psychedelic Warlords" (Brock) – 4:52

=== Atomhenge bonus tracks ===
11. "Psychedelic Warlords" (Brock) - 5:02
12. "Silver Machine" [full version] (Brock, Calvert) - 3:46

=== Atomhenge bonus disc ===
1. "Void City" [alternate version] (Brock, Bainbridge) - 6:38
2. "Candle Burning" (H. Lloyd-Langton, M. Lloyd-Langton) - 2:48
3. "5/4" (Bainbridge, H. Lloyd-Langton) - 3:21
4. "Waiting For Tomorrow" [alternate mix] (H. Lloyd-Langton, M. Lloyd-Langton) - 3:43
5. "Radio Telepathy" (Brock) - 5:44
6. "Dream Worker" [extended version] (Brock) - 2:34
7. "Lato" (Brock, Bainbridge) - 5:34
8. "Oscillations" (Brock) - 2:01
9. "Recent Reports" (Brock) - 5:48
10. "Lato Percussive Electro" (Brock) - 3:45
11. "Solitary Mind Games" [alternate version] (H. Lloyd-Langton, M. Lloyd-Langton) - 5:06
12. "Silver Machine" [short single version] (Brock, Calvert) - 2:58

== Personnel ==
Hawkwind

- Dave Brock – electric guitar, keyboards, vocals
- Huw Lloyd-Langton – electric guitar, vocals
- Harvey Bainbridge – bass guitar, keyboards, vocals
- Martin Griffin – drums

Guest musician

- Nik Turner – saxophone on "Void City"

== Credits ==
- Recorded at Rockfield Studios, Monmouth – June & July 1982. Produced with Pat Moran.
- Sleeve designed by Andrew Christian and Terry Oakes.

== Charts ==
Chart (1982)	Peak position
UK Albums (OCC)	29

== Release history ==
- October 1982: RCA/Active, RCALP 6055, UK vinyl
- October 1996: Emergency Broadcast System Records, EBSCD124, UK CD
- October 1996: Griffin Music, GCD613-2, USA CD
- October 2010: Atomhenge (Cherry Red) Records, ATOMCD2026, UK 2CD
