= Opa-Loka =

Opa-Loka may refer to:

- "Opa-Loka", a cut on Hawkwind's album Warrior on the Edge of Time
- Opa-locka, Florida, a city in the United States
