= Levitation (Hawkwind album) =

Studio album by Hawkwind
- Released: 17 October 1980
- Recorded: July–August 1980
- Studios: Roundhouse, London
- Genre: Space rock
- Length: Original album: 37:41; Disc 1: 77:54; Disc 2: 37:55; Disc 3: 40:29
- Label: Bronze
- Producers: Hawkwind, Ashley Howe

Hawkwind chronology
| Live Seventy Nine (1980) | Levitation (1980) | Sonic Attack (1981) |

Singles from Levitation
- 1. "Who's Gonna Win the War?" Released: 7 November 1980

Levitation is the tenth studio album by English rock group Hawkwind, released in 1980. It peaked at No. 21 on the UK Albums Chart.

At the time of its release, band leader Dave Brock stated: "with Levitation we’ve come full circle back to the style of our debut album. And that was the record which totally expressed our ideals and what we stood for." It is their first studio album after the departure of lead vocalist and lyricist Robert Calvert, and lyrics here tend to be cursory and the number of instrumentals is increased. It is also the only studio Hawkwind album to feature ex-Cream drummer Ginger Baker and first for ex-Gong keyboardist Tim Blake, who would later return to the band and play on 2010's Blood of the Earth.

== Recording ==
The band, who consisted of the same personnel that had recorded the previous album Live Seventy Nine, entered Roundhouse Recording Studios in July and August 1980 to record this album. The studio had been newly equipped with a 3M Digital Mastering System by Bronze Records, making this one of the earliest rock albums to be recorded with the burgeoning digital recording technology.

During the recording, Dave Brock became dissatisfied with drummer Simon King's inability to keep consistent tempo, claiming that "he couldn't play his drums properly 'cos he was taking bad drugs", although King stated "I simply wanted to get away. I was very heavily into drinking... and [after leaving I was] fixed on getting my family life together". They considered using a drum machine that was in the studio, but no one knew how to use it. Guitarist Huw Lloyd-Langton's wife Marion, who was press officer for Ginger Baker's manager Roy Ward's company, suggested approaching the drummer to contribute as a session player. He accepted the offer and completed his tracks in two days, surpassing expectations. Lloyd-Langton observed that "he breezed through ["Space Chase"] straight away. I don't think Simon could have played that... Ginger fitted the band like a glove. His style was just right for it." The band asked the drummer to remain with them, and despite having previously declared to the press his intentions of joining the newly reformed Atomic Rooster, he "found the atmosphere during the sessions so fantastic that I immediately decided to stay with Hawkwind. For me it's not just my umpteenth group, I'm determined to give it everything I’ve got. Hawkwind always have made timeless music, but you can definitely still hear the eighties in it."

== Promotion and tour ==
A Fireman's Ball benefit weekend for 30 and 31 August in a marquee in Cambridge had been arranged with Motörhead, Girlschool and Inner City Unit, but was cancelled by the City Corporation concerned about fire regulations and sanitary facilities.

The band undertook a 33-date tour of Britain and Ireland from 10 October through to 15 November to promote the album, with support from Vardis. Eight dates into the tour, Blake left after clashing with Brock over an incident leaving the hotel the morning after the Stoke concert. Blake's technician, Paul "Twink" Noble (who had previously played with Here and Now and would later join Gong), took Blake's place using Blake's equipment, until a road accident forced him to leave the tour after another five dates. Keith Hale, who had been in Blood Donor and was writing and producing for Toyah, then joined the band for the remainder of the tour. The dates included an unlikely appearance on 6 November at Worthy Farm, being "muddy... freezing [and] five miles from anywhere".

The band also undertook an additional eleven date tour of Britain between 12 and 22 December, with support from Leamington Spa NWOBHM group Chevy, the Lewisham Odeon concert on the 18 being professionally recorded. Brock pressed Bronze Records to release another live album from these tapes, but having just issued Live Seventy Nine, label head Gerry Bron declined stating of Hawkwind that "they were a bit lazy, they constantly wanted to do live albums, so they wouldn't have to write songs". The recordings were later issued on the albums Zones (1983), This Is Hawkwind, Do Not Panic (1984) and Hawkwind Anthology. The 2009 deluxe re-issue of Levitation by Atomhenge Records includes a newly remixed version of the entire concert.

Before they set out on tour, Bronze recorded in-studio promotional videos of the group miming performances of "Levitation", "Who's Gonna Win the war" and "World of Tiers". On 14 February 1981, the band appeared on the German television programme Musikladen performing "Motorway City" and "Who's Gonna Win the War".

== Critical reception ==
Professional ratings
Review scores
| Source | Rating |
|---|---|
| AllMusic | 3.5/5 stars |
| The Encyclopedia of Popular Music | 3/5 stars |
| Mojo | 4/5 stars |

Malcolm Dome reviewed the album for Record Mirror giving it full marks claiming it to be "a vast improvement on the four albums recorded with Charisma... herald[ing] a return to the Hawkwlnd style of the early '70s... [and] a pleasure to have once more an album that uses blistering sci-fi imagery as an angry searchlight focusing on alternative thought". Dome felt "Ginger Baker slot[s] in almost as it were second nature", highlights "Dust of Time" as "mystically inspired Eastern melodies and atmospherically desolate synthesisers which engulf the JG Ballardesque" and the album "intersperse[s] the serious stuff with more lighthearted, whimsical instrumentals."

== Songs ==
"Levitation" had been played during the band's previous UK Winter 1979 tour and, although not included on the live album Live Seventy Nine, a bootleg version was later released on the Complete '79 album. A live version from the Levitation tour was released on the album This is Hawkwind, Do Not Panic. Terry Bickers named his band Levitation after this album. The song was also covered on My Kantele by Amorphis.

The band had wanted "Motorway City" to be released as the album's single, but the record company preferred "Who's Gonna Win the War?" instead. The track features lead guitarist Lloyd-Langton using an E-bow. It had been performed on the band's previous UK Winter 1979 tour and included on the Live Seventy Nine album. A live version of this song from the Levitation tour was later issued in 1983 as a single from the Zones album.

"Psychosis" is an instrumental synthesiser piece by Harvey Bainbridge. It was included on the Levitation tour, a version being included, but not listed, on the album This Is Hawkwind, Do Not Panic.

The title of "World of Tiers" is a reference to the World of Tiers series of science fiction novels by Philip José Farmer. An instrumental, it is reminiscent of Fleetwood Mac's "Oh Well". It is another song that had been performed on the band's previous UK Winter 1979 tour, a bootleg version was later released on the Complete '79 album. A live version of this song from the Levitation tour was issued on the Hawkwind Anthology collection.

"Prelude" is an instrumental synthesiser piece by Tim Blake.

"Who's Gonna Win The War?" was released as a single from this album backed by the non-album track "Nuclear Toy". It too had been performed on the band's previous UK Winter 1979 tour, a bootleg version was later released on the Complete '79 album.

"Space Chase" is a fast-paced instrumental. A live version from the Levitation tour was released on the album This is Hawkwind, Do Not Panic.

The title "The 5th Second of Forever" references Robert Calvert's 1972 Space Ritual poem "The Ten Seconds of Forever", and it was subtitled "from the film" on the album as a joke by the band, the song not having been used by any film. It features a nylon stringed acoustic guitar intro and outro by Lloyd-Langton. A live version of this song from the Levitation tour was issued on the This is Hawkwind, Do Not Panic album under the title "Circles". Its lyrics have also been used under the title "Circles", although with no musical similarity, overdubbed on Hawkwind at Watchfield Festival 1975 (Weird Tape 3) and on Dave Brock demos 1982 (Weird Tape 7).

"Dust of Time" was performed during the Levitation tour, and an edited instrumental version with an intro taken from the outro of "The 5th Second of Forever" was issued on the album Zones under the title "The Island".

== Track listing ==
=== Side 1 ===
1. "Levitation" (Dave Brock) – 5:48
2. "Motorway City" (Brock) – 6:48
3. "Psychosis" (Harvey Bainbridge) – 2:22
4. "World of Tiers" (Bainbridge, Huw Lloyd-Langton) – 3:30

=== Side 2 ===
5. "Prelude" (Tim Blake) – 1:28
6. "Who's Gonna Win the War?" (Brock) – 4:45
7. "Space Chase" (Lloyd-Langton) – 3:11
8. "The 5th Second of Forever" (Brock, Lloyd-Langton) – 3:27
9. "Dust of Time" (Brock, Bainbridge, Lloyd-Langton) – 6:22

=== Griffin CD bonus track ===
10. "Nuclear Toy" (Brock, Lloyd-Langton) – 3:30

=== Atomhenge CD bonus tracks ===
10. "Valium 10" [full version] (Bainbridge, Brock, Mick Smith, Steve Swindells) – 7:53
11. "Time of..." (Bainbridge, Brock, Simon King, Swindells) – 4:11
12. "Who's Gonna Win the War?" [Hawklords version] (Brock) – 4:52
13. "Douglas in the Jungle" (Bainbridge, Brock, King, Swindells) – 6:53
14. "British Tribal Music" (Bainbridge, Brock, King, Swindells) – 3:56
15. "Nuclear Toy" [single B-side] (Brock, Lloyd-Langton) – 3:00
16. "Who's Gonna Win the War?" [single A-side] (Brock) – 3:39
17. "Brainstorm" [live 1980] (Nik Turner) – 5:47

=== Atomhenge bonus CD2 ===
1. "Technicians of Spaceship Earth"
  "Levitation" (Brock) – 7:28 [A]
2. "Motorway City" (Brock) – 7:36 [B]
3. "Death Trap" (Robert Calvert, Brock) – 4:44 [A]
4. "Angels of Death" (Brock) – 6:06 [A]
5. "Psychosis" [unlisted] (Bainbridge) – 1:17 [A]
  "The 5th Second of Forever" (Brock, Lloyd-Langton) – 4:13 [A]
  "Dust of Time" (Bainbridge, Brock, Lloyd-Langton) – 6:32 [B]

=== Atomhenge bonus CD3 ===
1. "Running Through the Back Brain (Messages)" (Michael Moorcock, Hawkwind) – 6:23 [B]
2. "Dangerous Vision" (Keith Hale) – 5:06 [B]
3. "Who's Gonna Win the War?" (Brock) – 7:26
4. "PSI Power" (Calvert, Brock) – 4:50 [A]
5. "Shot Down in the Night" (Swindells) – 7:15 [A]
6. "World of Tiers" (Bainbridge, Lloyd-Langton) – 5:18 [C]
7. "Space Chase" (Lloyd-Langton) – 4:11 [A]

== Personnel ==
Hawkwind

- Dave Brock – vocals, electric guitar, keyboards
- Huw Lloyd-Langton – electric guitar, acoustic guitar, backing vocals
- Harvey Bainbridge – bass guitar, keyboards, backing vocals
- Tim Blake – keyboards, backing vocals
- Ginger Baker – drums

Musicians on bonus tracks

- Steve Swindells – keyboards (on Hawklords at Rockfield Studios 1979 tracks)
- Mick Smith – drums (on Hawklords at Rockfield Studios 1979 "Valium 10")
- Simon King – drums (on Hawklords at Rockfield Studios 1979 tracks, except "Valium 10")
- Keith Hale – keyboards (on Hawkwind live at Lewisham Odeon 1980 tracks), vocals ("Dangerous Vision")
- Michael Moorcock – vocals (on Hawkwind live at Lewisham Odeon 1980 "Running Through the Back Brain")

== Credits ==
- Recorded on 3M Digital Mastering System at Roundhouse Studios in London, July and August 1980. Produced with Ashley Howe, engineered by Jools Cooper and Nick Rodgers.
- Sleeve by Linda Curry (front cover) and Phil Tonkyn (back cover).
- CD1 tracks 10–14: Recorded by Hawklords at Rockfield Studios 1979.
- CD1 track 17, CD2 and CD3: recorded by Hawkwind live at Lewisham Odeon 18 December 1980. Previously issued on [A] This Is Hawkwind, Do Not Panic; [B] Zones; [C] Hawkwind Anthology.

== Charts ==
| Chart (1980) | Peak position |
|---|---|
| UK Albums (Official Charts) | 21 |

== Release history ==
- October 1980: Bronze Records, BRON530, UK vinyl initial copies pressed on blue vinyl
- June 1987: Castle Communications, CLA129, UK CD and vinyl
- December 1988: Castle Communications, TFO17, UK 2CD and vinyl with Live Seventy Nine
- February 1992: Castle Communications, CLABX911, 3CD with Live Seventy Nine and Space Bandits
- September 1994: Griffin Music, GCD 230-2, USA CD
- July 1999: Essential Records, ESMCD736, UK CD digipak
- September 2009: Atomhenge (Cherry Red) Records, UK CD
- September 2009: Atomhenge (Cherry Red) Records, UK 3CD limited to 3000 copies
