= Back on the Streets (song) =

Single by Hawkwind
- B-side: "The Dream of Isis"
- Released: 28 January 1977
- Recorded: October 1976
- Studio: AIR, London
- Genre: Space rock
- Length: 3:03
- Label: Charisma
- Songwriters: R. Calvert; P. Rudolph
- Producer: Bob Potter

Hawkwind singles chronology
"Kerb Crawler" (1976)	"Back on the Streets" (1977)	"Quark, Strangeness and Charm" (1977)

"Back on the Streets" is a 1976 song by the UK rock group Hawkwind. It was originally released as a single in the UK (CB299) on 28 January 1977.

Hawkwind had toured the UK in September and October 1976 in support of their album Astounding Sounds, Amazing Music, and although the song had not appeared on that album it was included in the set-list, a live version being later released on the album Atomhenge 76.

The group were due to enter AIR Studios in October to record this song as a stand-alone single release, not to be included on any album. However, tensions within the band saw founding member and saxophonist Nik Turner and second drummer Alan Powell being expelled before recording began. The remaining five members cut the single and the song remained in the set during their December tour, after which it was dropped, never to be performed again. The music was written by Paul Rudolph and lyrics by Robert Calvert to the vocal melody of The Supremes' "Back in My Arms Again", and produced by Bob Potter.

The press reviews were mixed, the NME assessing it as "cranked-out basic chords designed to make your eardrums bleed, lyrics that are unintelligible apart from the chanted title-chorus, and the rhythm section playing like they enjoy feeling those blisters squish against their instruments", while others felt "It's all here - a hard-edge riff and plenty of instrumental colour. But whoever sat at the mixer had no idea about dynamic emphasis."

The song has been included on subsequent compilations, starting with 1980's Repeat Performance and is included as a bonus track on the 2009 re-mastered version of Astounding Sounds, Amazing Music.
