= Live Seventy Nine =

1980 live album by Hawkwind

Live album by Hawkwind
- Released: 21 July 1980
- Recorded: 8 December 1979
- Venues: St. Albans City Hall, St. Albans, Hertfordshire
- Genre: Space rock
- Length: 45:10; 55:55
- Label: Bronze
- Producers: Hawkwind and Ashley Howe

Hawkwind chronology
PXR5 (1979)	Live Seventy Nine (1980)	Levitation (1980)

Singles from Live Seventy Nine
- 1. "Shot Down in the Night" Released: 27 June 1980

Professional ratings
Review scores
Source	Rating
AllMusic	3/5 stars
The Encyclopedia of Popular Music	2/5 stars

Live Seventy Nine is a 1980 live album by Hawkwind recorded on their Winter 1979 UK tour. It reached #15 on the UK album chart.

This is a reconstituted Hawkwind with Brock, Bainbridge and King emerging from the dissolved Hawklords, joined by lead guitarist Huw Lloyd-Langton who had played on the debut album Hawkwind and keyboardist Tim Blake who was a long-standing friend of the band and had played on Gong's Radio Gnome trilogy.

The new line-up debuted at the first Futurama Festival at Queens Hall, Leeds on 9 September, then completed a 25-date UK tour in November and December with support from Doll by Doll, despite not having a record deal nor any product to promote, and ended the year at London's Electric Ballroom on 28 and 29 December with support from The Psychedelic Furs. The shows included Blake's collaborator from his Crystal Machine shows, the light artist Patrice Warrener using lasers. although the band would encounter resistance from council Health and Safety inspectors concerned at the potential harm the lasers posed to the audience, Bainbridge even claiming to have locked one such official in a cupboard to prevent his intervention.

Originally the band "didn't think the Oxford gig was very good, but we listened to the mixing-desk tape and were really surprised. So we mixed the master tape and got a deal with Bronze. If we hadn't got that deal, we'd probably have split up – we couldn't have carried on on our own." Manager Douglas Smith secured a two-album deal with Bronze Records, (Note: At that time, Smith had secured Bronze contracts not only for Motörhead and Hawkwind but also for other acts he was managing such as The Damned and Girlschool.) even if Gerry Bron confessed "I don't think we would have signed Hawkwind if it weren't for Motörhead, I can't say I was that interested... Once you run a record label and you're employing people, you have to make good commercial decisions – you can't turn away business, even if the business isn't what you particularly want to do".

The music is more energetic and aggressive than the previous albums released on Charisma Records and the album benefited from the rise in popularity of NWOBHM at the time. Malcolm Dome reviewed the album for Record Mirror positively, feeling it "should have been a total and utter success fit to rank among the best albums of the year", but "to package here only an extract [of the full show] serves only to do the band a disservice".

"Shot Down in the Night" had been written by Hawklords keyboardist Steve Swindells for single release, but he departed during the year to record a solo album. The single was backed by the non-album cut "Urban Guerrilla" and reached #59 on the UK singles chart. Swindells also released a studio version of this track as a single and on his Fresh Blood album which he recorded with King, Lloyd-Langton and Nic Potter. "Lighthouse" is from Tim Blake's solo album New Jerusalem. "Silver Machine" explodes one minute into the song and is suffixed with "Requiem". (In the concert it was segued into Levitation, which the band wasn't ready to show off.) A studio version of the new track "Motorway City" was recorded on the following Levitation album.

No live tour was undertaken to promote the album, just two weekend appearances at the Lyceum Theatre, London on 13 and 20 July, with support from Inner City Unit (with a guest appearance from Lemmy), Androids of Mu, Out on Blue Six, Beatnix and Wah! Heat.

== Track listing ==
=== Side 1 ===
1. "Shot Down in the Night" (Steve Swindells) – 7:39
2. "Motorway City" (Dave Brock) – 8:09
3. "Spirit of the Age" (Robert Calvert, Brock) – 8:20

=== Side 2 ===
4. "Brainstorm" (Nik Turner) – 8:41
5. "Lighthouse" (Tim Blake) – 6:25
6. "Master of the Universe" (Turner, Brock) – 4:33
7. "Silver Machine (Requiem)" (Calvert, Brock) – 1:23

=== Atomhenge CD bonus tracks ===
8. "Urban Guerrilla" (Calvert, Brock) – 6:28
9. "Shot Down in the Night" [single edit] (Swindells) – 4:18

== Personnel ==
Hawkwind

- Dave Brock – electric guitar, keyboards, vocals
- Huw Lloyd-Langton – electric guitar, vocals
- Harvey Bainbridge – bass guitar, vocals
- Tim Blake – keyboards, vocals
- Simon King – drums

== Credits ==
- Recorded on the Winter '79 tour.
- Produced by Hawkwind with Ashley Howe.
- Sleeve by Steve 'Krusher' Joule.

== Charts ==
Chart (1980)	Peak position
UK Albums (Official Charts)	15

== Release history ==
- July 1980: Bronze Records, BRON527, UK vinyl
- December 1988: Castle Communications, TFO17, UK 2CD and vinyl with Levitation
- February 1992: Castle Communications, CLABX911, 3CD with Levitation and Space Bandits
- February 1992: Castle Communications, CLACD243, UK CD
- September 1994: Griffin Music, GCD 229–2, USA CD
- July 1999: Essential Records, ESMCD735, UK CD digipak
- March 2009: Atomhenge (Cherry Red) Records, ATOMCD1011, UK CD

== Complete '79: Collector Series Volume 1 ==
Complete '79: Collector Series Volume 1

Live album by Hawkwind
- Released: 29 November 1999
- Recorded: Hammersmith Odeon, 1 December 1979
- Genre: Space rock
- Label: Voiceprint Records – HAWKVP4CD
- Producer: Hawkwind

Hawkwind chronology
Choose Your Masques: Collectors Series Volume 2 (1999)	Complete '79: Collector Series Volume 1 (1999)	Atomhenge 76 (2000)

Professional ratings
Review scores
Source	Rating
AllMusic	link

Complete '79: Collector Series Volume 1 is 1999 released album of a 1979 concert by Hawkwind.

During 1999, Brock issued a slew of archive recordings through Voiceprint Records to generate money to pay off an outstanding Inland Revenue tax bill. No permission from the other musicians was sought, although they did duly receive accounting and royalties once the outstanding bill was settled, leading to several members complaining about this activity, and former manager Douglas Smith commenting "I think it's wrong. As a human being and as a manager, I have to get the permission of all the artists involved before I would do a deal."

This recording is not professional, possibly being a mixing desk tape but probably an audience bootleg. The sound levels and frequency fluctuate throughout making this difficult listening despite a good band performance. It purports to be the full unexpurgated concert, but there are clearly edits, notably during "Brainstorm" at 5:08 into Brock playing "You Know You're Only Dreaming".

Exactly why such a poor quality recording was used for this release is uncertain, as the Hawkwind Anthology full versions of "Shot Down in the Night" and "Urban Guerrilla" demonstrate there are superior recordings available. Nevertheless, this CD contains the only available live versions of "PXR5" and Tim Blake's "New Jerusalem". The CD booklet is a reproduction of the 1979 tour programme by Steve 'Krusher' Joule.

=== CD 1 ===
1. "Shot Down in the Night" (Swindells) – 7:36
2. "Motorway City" (Brock) – 9:07
3. "Spirit of the Age" (Calvert, Brock) – 7:28 – 8:01
4. "Urban Guerrilla" (Calvert, Brock) – 6:58 – 6:25
5. "Who's Gonna Win The War?" (Brock) – 8:30 – 5:58
6. "World of Tiers" (Bainbridge, Lloyd-Langton) – 3:11 – 5:41

=== CD 2 ===
1. "New Jerusalem" (Blake) – 9:34
2. "Lighthouse" (Blake) – 10:08
3. "Brainstorm" (Turner) – 8:10
4. "Satellite" (Brock) – 2:41
5. "PXR5" (Calvert, Brock) – 5:28 – 4:11
6. "Master of the Universe" (Turner, Brock) – 1:57 – 3:14
7. "Silver Machine" (Calvert, Brock) – 6:54 – 4:00
8. "Levitation" (Brock) – 3:28 – 6:20

Note: The banding of tracks on the CD deviates from the actual songs, the first timings listed being those of the CD tracks, the second being the actual timings of the song.
