= Live 1990 =

Live 1990 may refer to:

- Live 1990 (Hatfield and the North album)
- Live 1990 (Hawkwind album)
