= Glastonbury 90 =

Live album by Hawkwind
- Released: 8 November 1999
- Recorded: Travellers Field, Glastonbury Festival, 23 June 1990
- Genre: Space rock
- Label: Voiceprint Records – HAWKVP1CD

Hawkwind chronology
The 1999 Party (1999)	Glastonbury 90 (1999)	Choose Your Masques: Collectors Series Volume 2 (1999)

Professional ratings
Review scores
Source	Rating
AllMusic	link

Glastonbury 90 is a 1999 live album release of a 1990 concert by Hawkwind.

== Track listing ==
1. "Black Elk Speaks" [listed as "Magic of the Earth"] (Black Elk/Brock) – 1:05
2. "Angels of Death" (Brock) – 6:06
3. "Golden Void" (Brock) – 7:13
4. "Brainstorm" (Turner) – 4:50
5. "The Door" (Wishart) – 2:57
6. "Ejection" (Calvert) – 5:53
7. "Sword of Dawn" (Hawkwind) – 5:46
8. "Hassan-i-Sabah" [aka "Assassins of Allah"] (Calvert/Rudolph) – 3:55
9. "Dream Worker" (Bainbridge) – 3:59
10. "You Shouldn't Do That" (Turner/Brock) – 3:58
11. "Images" (Wishart/Brock/Davey) – 7:10

== Personnel ==
- Bridget Wishart – vocals
- Dave Brock – guitar, keyboards, vocals
- Alan Davey – bass guitar, vocals
- Harvey Bainbridge – keyboards, vocals
- Richard Chadwick – drums
