= Motorway City =

"Motorway City (live)"

Single by Hawkwind
- B-side: "Master of the Universe" (live)
- Released: 28 October 1983
- Recorded: Lewisham Odeon, 18 December 1980
- Genre: Space rock
- Label: Flicknife Records - FLS025
- Songwriter: Dave Brock
- Producer: Hawkwind

Hawkwind singles chronology
""Who's Gonna Win the War?" (demo)" (1982)	"Motorway City (live)" (1983)

"Motorway City" is a 1983 single by the UK rock group Hawkwind.

This version was recorded live on the Levitation tour and released as a single on Flicknife Records (FLS025) in the UK on 28 October 1983, taken from the album Zones. The B-side "Master of the Universe" was from the same concert, but did not appear on the album, appearing sometime later on the Hawkwind Anthology compilation album.

The song was first recorded in demo form by the Hawklords at Rockfield Studios in 1979, eventually appearing on the Various Artists 2000 album Family Tree (Voiceprint Records, HAWKVP13CD). It made its way into the live set for the UK Winter 1979 tour, and its first recorded appearance was on the 1980 Live Seventy Nine album. A studio version was soon recorded and released on the 1980 album Levitation, and a special version was also recorded for single release, but Bronze Records declined to issue it releasing "Who's Gonna Win The War?" instead.

It remained a popular addition to the live set until Huw Lloyd-Langton left the band in 1988, but it re-emerged at the turn of the millennium, appearing on the live albums Yule Ritual (2001) and Canterbury Fayre 2001 (2002).
