= Messages (album) =

1974 album by Steve Swindells

Studio album by Steve Swindells
- Released: 1974
- Recorded: 1974
- Genre: Rock
- Label: RCA
- Producer: Mark Edwards

Steve Swindells chronology
| Messages (1974) | Fresh Blood (1980) |

Professional ratings
Review scores
| Source | Rating |
|---|---|
| AllMusic | 3/5 stars |

Messages is the debut studio album by the English singer and musician Steve Swindells, released in 1974 (see 1974 in music). Produced by his manager Mark Edwards, Swindells felt the production poor despite the presence of quality musicians.

A follow-up album Swallows was recorded, mastered and test pressings manufactured, but "Edwards had blown Steve’s deal with RCA by sweeping everything off the managing director’s desk with his umbrella in a drunken/druggy rage". The 2009 re-issue of the album includes a bonus CD of this previously unreleased second album.

== Track listing ==
All tracks written by Steve Swindells

1. "Miles Away Again"
2. "Energy Crisis"
3. "The Earl's Court Case"
4. "Living in Sin"
5. "I Don't Like Eating Meat"
6. "Shake Up Your Soul"
7. "Surrender"
8. "I Can't See Where the Light Switch Is"
9. "Messages From Heaven"

=== Swindells Swallow ===
1. "Flash In The Pan"
2. "The Walking Song"
3. "When The Clapperboard Has Clapped"
4. "Easy On The Night"
5. "Dealing With The Feeling"
6. "Better Times Are Here"
7. "Doodiboogie"
8. "The Last One To Know"

== Personnel ==
- Steve Swindells – Keyboards, Vocals
- Bruce Knapp – Guitar
- Mark Warner – Guitar
- Caleb Quaye – Guitar
- Danny Thompson – Bass
- Dave Wintour – Bass
- John Gustafson – Bass
- Barry DeSouza – Drums
- Michael Giles – Drums
- Morris Pert – Percussion
- Chris Mercer – Saxophone
- Barry St. John – Vocals
- Rosetta Hightower – Vocals
- Doris Troy – Vocals
- Mountain Fjord Orchestra Orchestra
- Mohamed Shinan - bass

== Release details ==
- 1974 – RCA Victor – UK: LPLI5057
- Single released: "Energy Crisis" / "Shake Up Your Soul"
- 2009 – Esoteric Records – UK: ECLEC2163 link
