= High Tide (album) =

Studio album by High Tide
- Released: July 1970
- Recorded: 5 April – 6 May 1970
- Studios: Morgan Studios, London
- Genres: Progressive rock, psychedelia, hard rock
- Length: 32:21
- Label: Liberty
- Producer: High Tide

High Tide chronology
Sea Shanties (1969)	High Tide (1970)	Interesting Times (1989)

High Tide is the second album by High Tide. The album is slightly less heavy than their debut, Sea Shanties. Though guitarist Tony Hill would later record with a new band under the High Tide banner, as well as releasing posthumous compilations of demos, this was the last proper album by the original group.

== Reception ==
Professional ratings
Review scores
Source	Rating
Allmusic	3/5 stars

The Allmusic review by Wilson Neate awarded the album 3 stars stating "The interplay of guitarist Tony Hill and violinist Simon House is still very much at the core of High Tide's distinctive hybrid of psychedelia, prog, and hard rock, but while Hill lays down his characteristically intricate, searing guitar lines, he forgoes the sort of weighty, molten riffage that made Sea Shanties such a behemoth. Without that overall sonic density, this album fails to engage listeners as readily as its predecessor... alongside Sea Shanties, this unimaginatively titled, three-track, 32-minute album finds High Tide at a disappointing low ebb, as if ideas and energy were already drying up."

== Track listing ==
All tracks by High Tide except where noted.

Side A
No.	Title	Length
1.	"Blankman Cries Again"	8:28
2.	"The Joke"	9:27
Total length:		17:55

Side B
No.	Title	Length
3.	"Saneonymous"	14:26
Total length:		14:26; 32:21

2006 remaster bonus tracks
No.	Title	Writer(s)	Length
4.	"The Great Universal Protection Racket"	Tony Hill	15:45
5.	"The Joke"		7:44
6.	"Blankman Cries Again"		8:25
7.	"Ice Age"	Tony Hill	3:25
Total length:			67:40

== Personnel ==
High Tide

- Roger Hadden - drums, piano, pipe organ
- Tony Hill - guitar, vocals, acoustic guitar, organ
- Simon House - electric violin, organ, piano
- Peter Pavli - bass guitar
