= Sea Shanties (High Tide album) =

Studio album by High Tide
- Released: October 1969
- Recorded: 2 June – 8 July 1969
- Studio: Olympic Studios, London
- Genre: Progressive rock; psychedelic rock; hard rock; heavy metal
- Length: 39:38
- Label: Liberty Records
- Producer: Denny Gerrard

High Tide chronology
Sea Shanties (1969)	High Tide (1970)

Sea Shanties is the debut album of English rock band High Tide, notable for including the violin as a rock instrument. The cover artwork was drawn by Paul Whitehead.

== Production ==
Denny Gerrard (of Warm Sounds) produced Sea Shanties in return for High Tide acting as the backing band on his solo album Sinister Morning. The recording sessions for the two albums overlapped, with Sinister Morning being finished in late June 1969, and Sea Shanties being started on the 2nd of that month.

== Reception ==
Professional ratings
Review scores
Source	Rating
AllMusic	4/5 stars
Encyclopedia of Popular Music	5/5 stars

Though it met with a scathing review in Melody Maker, reviews in the underground press were universally positive, and sales were just enough to convince Liberty to give the green light to a second album.

The AllMusic retrospective review by Wilson Neate stated "On Sea Shanties, there's nothing fey and flowery in Hill's bleak lyrics or his doomy Jim Morrison-like delivery, and psychedelia's melodic whimsy is supplanted by a physicality more in line with the visceral heft of metal progenitors...High Tide weren't a power trio, though, and it was the interplay of Hill's guitar with Simon House's violin that created the band's unique signature. Showing that rock violin needn't be a marginal adornment, House whips up an aggressive edge that rivals the guitar... High Tide had the muscularity of a no-nonsense proto-metal band, but they also ventured into prog territory with changing time signatures and tempos, soft-hard dynamics, multi-part arrangements, and even some ornate faux-Baroque interludes... Far from the collection of nautical ditties its name suggests, Sea Shanties is an overlooked gem encapsulating the shifting musical currents in late-'60s British rock."

It was voted number 5 in the All-Time 50 Long Forgotten Gems from Colin Larkin's All Time Top 1000 Albums.

== Track listing ==
All tracks written by Tony Hill except where noted.

Side A
No.	Title	Length
1.	"Futilist's Lament"	5:17
2.	"Death Warmed Up"	9:08
3.	"Pushed, But Not Forgotten"	4:43
Total length:		19:08

Side B
No.	Title	Writer(s)	Length
4.	"Walking Down Their Outlook"		4:58
5.	"Missing Out"		9:38
6.	"Nowhere"	Roger Hadden, Simon House	5:54
Total length:			20:30; 39:38

2006 remaster bonus tracks
No.	Title	Length
7.	"The Great Universal Protection Racket"	11:24
8.	"Dilemma"	5:14
9.	"Death Warmed Up" (demo)	7:35
10.	"Pushed, But Not Forgotten" (demo)	4:01
11.	"Time Gauges"	6:24
Total length:		74:16

== Personnel ==
High Tide

- Roger Hadden - drums
- Tony Hill - guitar, acoustic guitar, vocals
- Simon House - violin, organ
- Peter Pavli - bass
