= Fresh Blood (album) =

Studio album by Steve Swindells
- Released: October 1980
- Recorded: 1980
- Studio: Sawmills Studios, Cornwall, Rngland
- Genre: Pop rock; post-punk
- Length: 42:12
- Label: Atco
- Producer: Steve Swindells

Steve Swindells chronology
Messages (1974)	Fresh Blood (1980)	New Crescent Yard (2008)

Singles from Fresh Blood
- 1. "Shot Down in the Night" Released: June 1980; 2. "Turn It On, Turn It Off" Released: April 1981

Professional ratings
Review scores
Source	Rating
AllMusic	3.5/5 stars

Fresh Blood is the second studio album by the English singer-songwriter Steve Swindells. The album was originally released in late 1980 on the label Atco. The album was Swindells' first solo album following his departure from Hawkwind, due to an offer that had been made to him by Atco to make this album. It was produced by Swindells himself, after being unable to afford advances offered by Jim Steinman, Jimmy Iovine, and David Bowie. Bowie would later praise the album, along with Messages as sounding "pretty good"

When the album was released in late 1980, it received positive reviews but failed to chart in the UK. "Shot Down in the Night", and "Turn It On, Turn It Off" were released as singles, but they both also failed to chart. He was later dropped from the label, when it failed to make sufficient sales.

Fresh Blood was remastered in 2009 by Atomhenge (ATOMCD1015). The 24 bit remastering was done by Ben Wiseman at The Audio Archiving Company in London. The album was re-published by Cherry Red Records, in CD and digital formats, with the former including a 16 page illustrated booklet written by Steve. It's rare now in physical form but you can stream or download on the usual sites and apps.

Swindells is backed on this album by guitarist Huw Lloyd-Langton and drummer Simon King, both from Hawkwind, and bassist Nic Potter from Van der Graaf Generator.

== Critical reception ==
=== Retrospective review ===
Fresh Blood received positive reviews from contemporary music critics. In a retrospective review for AllMusic, critic Dave Thompson gave the album three and a half out of five stars and wrote that "Swindells' Fresh Blood heralded the coming rise of the keyboard, while gallantly introducing the immediate musical past -- punk and New Wave, to the future. But the future wasn't beckoning him; a tad too ahead of his time for the U.S., and just a step behind the times for the U.K., this fabulous album sunk with little trace and even less interest from his label. Swept in the cross-currents of its time, the set still sounds surprisingly fresh today, and in hindsight even more glorious."

== Track listing ==
All tracks are written by Steve Swindells.

Side one
No.	Title	Length
1.	"Turn It On, Turn It Off"	3:12
2.	"Fresh Blood"	3:36
3.	"I Feel Alive"	3:47
4.	"Low Life Joe"	4:16
5.	"Bitter and Twisted"	3:50

Side two
No.	Title	Length
6.	"Don't Wait on the Stairs"	3:22
7.	"Is It Over Now?"	4:08
8.	"Down on Love Street"	5:37
9.	"Figures of Authority"	5:12
10.	"Shot Down in the Night"	5:12
Total length:		42:12

== Personnel ==
- Steve Swindells – vocals; keyboards; synthesizers
- Huw Lloyd-Langton – electric guitar
- Nic Potter – bass guitar
- Simon King – drums
- Bob Carlos Clarke - photography
- Richard Evans - graphic design

== Covers ==
- The Who's lead vocalist Roger Daltrey covered two tracks from this album, "Bitter and Twisted" on the 1980 soundtrack to the film McVicar, and "Don't Wait on the Stairs" on his 1984 album Parting Should Be Painless.
- "Shot Down in the Night" had originally been written for Hawkwind while Swindells was in the band in 1979. Hawkwind released their own live version of the track as a single and on the 1980 album Live Seventy Nine.

== Release history ==
- October 1980: Atco Records, UK: K50738, USA: SD38-128, vinyl
- 27 July 2009: Atomhenge (Cherry Red) Records, ATOMCD1015, UK CD
