= Warrior on the Edge of Time =

Studio album by Hawkwind
- Released: 9 May 1975
- Recorded: January and March 1975
- Studio: Rockfield Studios, Monmouth; mixed at Olympic Studios, London
- Genre: Psychedelic rock; progressive rock; space rock
- Length: 44:36; 47:44 (with bonus track "Motorhead")
- Label: United Artists (UK and Europe); Atco (US); Liberty (Japan)
- Producer: Hawkwind

Hawkwind chronology
| Hall of the Mountain Grill (1974) | Warrior on the Edge of Time (1975) | Astounding Sounds, Amazing Music (1976) |

Singles from Warrior on the Edge of Time
- 1. "Kings of Speed" b/w "Motorhead" Released: March 1975

Warrior on the Edge of Time is the fifth studio album by the English rock band Hawkwind. Many of the lyrics are by Michael Moorcock, and the album is loosely based on the concept of Moorcock's novel The Eternal Champion. It was the band's highest-charting studio album on the UK Albums Chart, where it peaked at number 13, and was their third and last album to make the US Billboard chart, where it peaked at number 150. Reviews have been mixed, with Melody Maker panning the album and particularly criticizing the vocal work while the All Music Guide has praised the album for features such as the songwriting. This would also be the last album to feature the band's bassist Ian "Lemmy" Kilmister, who was fired from the band one day before the album's release.

== Background ==
Throughout 1974, Hawkwind heavily toured the UK, Europe and North America with their set being composed predominantly from that year's Hall of the Mountain Grill album. Unusually for them, no new material had been introduced with the exception of some Michael Moorcock poems based on his Elric fictional character, which appeared on the 1974 live album The 1999 Party. In December through to February, the group embarked upon a series of UK dates known as "A Dead Singer" tour after the Moorcock story published in the accompanying tour programme, with support from Dr Feelgood (Wilko Johnson: "Us and Hawkwind were a great bill. We had just been signed by United Artists, Hawkwind's label. UA wanted to give us a little experience in the larger venues. That was where I first met and made friends with Lemmy, who turned out to be a good pal.").

Given that the band owed one final single to United Artists to conclude their recording contract, during a mid-tour break they entered Olympic Studios on 5 and 6 January where they recorded Brock's "Kings of Speed" (which featured lyrics written by Moorcock originally intended for inclusion on his New Worlds Fair album), Lemmy's "Motorhead" and House's "Spiral Galaxy". The first two were selected as the A-side and B-side respectively, and the single was released on 7 March.

On resuming their UK tour, Dave Brock expressed disillusionment with the band's popularity commenting that "it's getting to be like a war", preferring his life with his wife Sylvie and their two children on their ten-acre Devon farm, trading under an alias in a community which knew nothing of his association with rock music. He revealed the growing disharmony within the band, "you wouldn't believe some of the scenes that go on backstage. All the fucking rows, people losing their temper." He was particularly critical of Turner on both a musical level ("Some nights I've unplugged my guitar and marched across the stage to sort Nik out. He keeps playing the saxophone when I'm singing and I've told him a thousand times not to do that") and personal level ("Nik's really gullible, you know. He knows so many people and they always used to take him for a ride. It's so easy because he's not very sussed out"). He was also critical of Lemmy listing a catalogue of on-stage problems with him, and he "lives that [Hells Angels] fantasy. It's what he'd like to be, but he can't", but he's "quite a good front man, though". Of the forthcoming Eternal Champion project, Brock revealed that he wanted Arthur Brown for the title role, and it would be "a complete fantasy trip on every level... and if we did it, that would be the end [of Hawkwind]".

The next contract the group signed was a North American deal with Atlantic Records subsidiary Atco Records. With a scheduled North American tour for April and May, "Atlantic... needed an album to co-incide with our visit". For the only time in the 1970s, the group were due to record without having prepared new material in a live environment, which led to concern that "we're going to be really pushed just to get an album together". The band entered Rockfield Studios in March, King explaining "we laid all the backing tracks down in about three and a half days. Then, after we had a couple of days off, we went down to Olympic and added bits here and there, dubbed over vocals and mixed it all. That took about three days, and it was finished."

The band "gave [the songs] their debut on two British gigs at Yeovil and Dunstable [12 and 13 April]", then headed to North America for a tour at the end of April into May, during which Paul Rudolph replaced Lemmy. The album was released by ATCO on 9 May and licensed to United Artists for a UK release. The group promoted the album with tours in Germany and France in June, the UK in July and August including headlining the Reading Festival and appearing at Watchfield Free Festival.

At the beginning of the year, Turner, House, Powell and King had contributed to Michael Moorcock and The Deep Fix's New Worlds Fair, which also featured a guest appearance from Brock. In April, Moorcock, House and Turner contributed to the recording of Robert Calvert's Lucky Leif and the Longships, produced by Brian Eno and arranged by Rudolph.

== Songs ==
See also the article "Kings of Speed".

The lyrics of "Assault and Battery" quote from Henry Wadsworth Longfellow's poem "A Psalm of Life". The song is a popular live number, being performed occasionally over the years, and has appeared on numerous live albums, sometimes under the title "Lives of Great Men". It was included as part of the live show for The Chronicle of the Black Sword concept, appearing on the album Live Chronicles.

"The Golden Void" segues from "Assault and Battery", and the two songs are often performed live as a pair as on the albums Palace Springs (1991) and Canterbury Fayre 2001. The song is also a popular live number and has appeared on live albums, sometimes under the title "Void of Golden Light", as on 1994's The Business Trip.

"The Wizard Blew His Horn", "Standing at the Edge" and "Warriors" are Michael Moorcock poems based on his Eternal Champion literary figure. The poems are recited to atmospheric soundscapes provided by Simon House, and the percussionists Simon King and Alan Powell. The band had been performing them on stage during 1974, versions appearing on The 1999 Party live album.

"Opa-Loka" is an instrumental that features a motorik rhythm and is strongly influenced by the music of Neu!. It was performed live, but when Robert Calvert joined the band at the beginning of 1976, he would recite the poem "Vikings on Mars" over the top of it, the song evolving into "Uncle Sam's on Mars" on the 1979 album PXR5. Powell, who had lived in Florida in 1970, named the piece after the place Opa-locka.

"The Demented Man" is a Brock number played on acoustic guitar. (Also listed as "The Demented King".)

The lyrics of "Magnu" are based upon Percy Shelley's poem "Hymn of Apollo". Live versions of the song appear on the albums Choose Your Masques: Collectors Series Volume 2 (1982), The Friday Rock Show Sessions (1986) and Canterbury Fayre 2001. The first six lines of Magnu are nearly word for word identical to a magical chant that appears in an old Slavic folk-tale, "The History Of Prince Slugobyl; Or, The Invisible Knight", used to summon the magical horse, Magu (sic), first published in English translation in 1896 in "Fairy tales of the Slav peasants and herdsmen."

"Spiral Galaxy 28948" is a Simon House instrumental, the title being his date of birth (28 September 1948), except his birthday is actually 29 August 1948 - a typo mixup between '289' and '298'. It was performed live in 1975 after the release of the album, and again during 2001 when House had temporarily rejoined the band, a version appearing on the album Canterbury Fayre 2001.

== Cover ==
The original album sleeve unfolds into a large shield-shape, revealing that the silhouetted Warrior is standing at the edge of an apparently bottomless chasm. The landscape on the other side of the chasm is a mirror image, with another setting sun, a closer inspection of this entire image reveals a helmeted face. The reverse of the cover depicts a bronze shield bearing the 8-rayed emblem of Chaos, as described in Moorcock's books.

== Critical reception ==
Professional ratings
Review scores
| Source | Rating |
|---|---|
| Allmusic | 3/5 stars |
| The Encyclopedia of Popular Music | 3/5 stars |

Allan Jones in Melody Maker (10 May 1975) was critical in his review of the album despite it being "probably Hawkwind's most professional record" due to the advance in their "technical proficiency", specifically the contributions of Simon House. The compositions are in the "standard Hawkwind traditions of sweeping synthesiser passages contrasting ethereal space with the violence of monotonous bass and rhythm guitar", and of the poems he says "If Moorcock feels qualified to describe any of these pieces as poetry, then that's his problem" and that they are delivered "with all the emotion of Davros being exterminated by renegade Daleks".

Geoff Barton in Sounds assessed it as "includ[ing] most of their traditional characteristics (leaden guitar, ritualistic chanting, wailing moogs, SF lyrics) but in a much more mature and varied setting", and that "Simon House's influence is strongly felt" making it "rather fuller, more interesting than usual".

=== Band reaction ===
Michael Moorcock: "Warrior on the Edge of Time was a concept of mine. What Dave tends to do is he says 'Do us a concept' or 'I've got this rough concept, can you work it out?' I do it, then Dave has a different idea and the whole thing shifts away, so that's the way it works. It's a perfectly good way of working – it tends to give Dave a bit of a start or whatever. I was doing a lot of my 'Eternal Champion' stuff on stage, so it seemed automatic to do that because there were so many numbers I could fit into that. I was only in the studio about an hour to do the stuff I did, and it was one of those weird things I didn't get the session fee either."

Lemmy: "The album was a fuck-up from start to finish. That 'Opa-Loka' was a lot of fucking rubbish. I wasn't even on that. That was the drummer's thing, that track... We were kind of complacent anyway. If you have a hit album, you're complacent, and if you have two you really are in trouble. With them, they had four, 'cos they had In Search of Space before me... There's great stuff on all them albums. 'The Golden Void' was a beautiful track, but by then I was well out of favour."

Dave Brock: "There was some good stuff on that album. I think we peaked then, in 1974/75."

Simon King: "I suppose I’m two-thirds happy with this one. For me that’s not bad as I was only half happy with the last one! Warriors is a different musical thing because it’s Simon House’s first real contribution: on Hall of the Mountain Grill he was too new to be able to have that much influence, and now, of course we’ve got Alan as a second drummer, which has meant a lot of changes."

== Track listing ==
Side one
| No. | Title | Writing | Length |
|---|---|---|---|
| 1. | "Assault and Battery (Part 1)" | Dave Brock | 5:33 |
| 2. | "The Golden Void (Part 2)" | Brock | 4:35 |
| 3. | "The Wizard Blew His Horn" | Michael Moorcock, Simon House, Alan Powell, Simon King | 1:58 |
| 4. | "Opa-Loka" | Powell, King | 5:09 |
| 5. | "The Demented Man" | Brock | 3:57 |

Side two
| No. | Title | Writing | Length |
|---|---|---|---|
| 6. | "Magnu" | Brock | 8:15 |
| 7. | "Standing at the Edge" | Moorcock, House, Powell, King | 2:46 |
| 8. | "Spiral Galaxy 28948" | House | 3:46 |
| 9. | "Warriors" | Moorcock, House, Powell, King | 1:58 |
| 10. | "Dying Seas" | Nik Turner | 3:03 |
| 11. | "Kings of Speed" | Moorcock, Brock | 3:36 |

CD bonus track
| No. | Title | Writing | Length |
|---|---|---|---|
| 12. | "Motorhead" | Ian Kilmister | 3:08 |

Atomhenge disc 1 bonus tracks
| No. | Title | Length |
|---|---|---|
| 11. | "Motorhead" | 3:06 |
| 12. | "Soldiers at the Edge of Time" (Michael Moorcock version) | 2:06 |
| 13. | "On the Road" | 1:11 |
| 14. | "The Wizard Blew His Horn" (Nik Turner version) | 1:55 |
| 15. | "Spiral Galaxy 28948" (demo) | 6:15 |
| 16. | "Soldiers at the Edge of Time" (Nik Turner version) | 2:03 |
| 17. | "Motorhead" (Dave Brock vocal version) | 3:07 |
| 18. | "Kings of Speed" (instrumental version) | 4:30 |

Atomhenge disc 2 bonus tracks
| No. | Title | Length |
|---|---|---|
| 11. | "Motorhead" (instrumental demo) | 3:07 |
| 12. | "Dawn" | 8:57 |
| 13. | "Watchfield Festival Jam" (Watchfield Free Festival on 23 August 1975) | 11:48 |
| 14. | "Circles" (Watchfield Free Festival on 23 August 1975) | 4:29 |
| 15. | "I Am the Eye" (Watchfield Free Festival on 23 August 1975) | 4:25 |

- The Atomhenge edition lists Assault And Battery / The Golden Void as one track.

== Personnel ==
Hawkwind

- Dave Brock – guitar, keyboards, vocals, bass guitar ("Opa-Loka")
- Nik Turner – saxophone, flute, vocals ("Standing at the Edge", "Dying Seas")
- Lemmy (Ian Kilmister) – bass guitar, vocals ("Motorhead")
- Simon House – violin, Mellotron, VCS3, keyboards
- Simon King – drums, percussion
- Alan Powell – drums, percussion

Additional personnel

- Michael Moorcock – vocals ("The Wizard Blew His Horn" and "Warriors")

== Credits ==
- Recorded at Rockfield Studios, March 1975. Produced by Hawkwind, engineered by Dave Charles. Mixed at Olympic Studios, engineered by Phil Chapman and Steve Owen.
- "Kings of Speed", "Motorhead" and "Spiral Galaxy 28948" recorded at Olympic Studios, 5 and 6 January 1975.
- Sleeve designed by Eddie Brash (a pseudonym used by Barney Bubbles) and Comte Pierre D'Auvergne (a pseudonym used by Pierre Tubbs).

== Charts ==
| Chart (1975) | Peak position |
|---|---|
| Australian Albums (Kent Music Report) | 91 |
| UK Albums (Official Charts) | 13 |
| US Billboard 200 | 150 |

| Chart (2013) | Peak position |
|---|---|
| Scottish Albums (Official Charts) | 74 |
| UK Rock & Metal Albums (Official Charts) | 12 |

== Certifications ==
| Region | Certification | Certified units/sales |
|---|---|---|
| United Kingdom (BPI) | Silver | 60,000^{^} |
^{^} Shipments figures based on certification alone.

== Release history ==
- May 1975: United Artists Records, UAG29766, UK vinyl – original copies came in gatefold foldout sleeve with inner sleeve. Later pressings retained the inner sleeve but had a normal single LP sleeve based on the outer part of the gatefold.
- May 1975: Atco Records, SD36-115, USA vinyl
- Jan 1981: Liberty Records, UAG29766, UK vinyl
- Oct 1992: Dojo Records, DOJOCD84, UK CD
- May 1993: Griffin Music, 55421 3931-2, USA CD
- 27 May 2013: Atomhenge (Cherry Red) Records, ATOMCD1035, UK CD.
- 27 May 2013: Atomhenge (Cherry Red) Records, ATOMCD31037, UK 2CD+DVD.
- 27 May 2013: Atomhenge (Cherry Red) Records, ATOMBOX1001, UK 2CD+DVD+vinyl.

=== CD masters ===
In a 2011 interview Nigel Reeve, custodian of Hawkwind's United Artists Records archive at EMI, explained that Warrior on the Edge of Time had originally been released on a separate contract with United Artists, and its rights were no longer held by EMI; hence, it was omitted from EMI's remastering and release of Hawkwind's United Artists catalogue in 1996.

The album was released in the UK on CD for the first time in 1992 on the Dojo label, mastered from vinyl. A second version was released in 1993 on the Canadian label Griffin Music, mastered from a first-generation copy of the original master. This master was the Atco tape used for the 1975 North American vinyl release, and included the single mix of "Kings of Speed". The Atco master used by Griffin was originally created at Olympic Studios and didn't have any fades on the tracks. A set of accompanying notes written by Dave Brock in 1975 were used to recreate the original fades when Griffin created its digital master. No EQ was used when the Griffin digital master was created. The transfer was done to match the original vinyl as closely as possible.

In May 2013, Cherry Red reissued the album, along with a new stereo and 5.1 mix by Steven Wilson, on the Atomhenge label managed by Esoteric Recordings. It was also confirmed that the original master tapes were used.
