= Interesting Times (album) =

Studio album by High Tide
- Released: 1986
- Recorded: late 1970s
- Genres: Progressive rock, electronica, new wave
- Length: 48:12
- Label: Independent
- Producer: High Tide

High Tide chronology
High Tide (1970)	Interesting Times (1986)	The Flood (1990)

Interesting Times is the third album by High Tide. Two original members, Tony Hill and Simon House, reformed the name. It was originally released as a mail order cassette, and later reissued on CD and vinyl with two bonus tracks.

== Track listing ==
All tracks are written by Tony Hill except where noted.

No.	Title	Writer(s)	Length
1.	"Nightmare" (Bonus track on 2003 reissue)	Simon House	4:19
2.	"The Nexialist"		4:04
3.	"Survival"	House, Hill	5:02
4.	"Ice Age"		3:42
5.	"Dream Beam"		3:38
6.	"Movie Madness"		6:37
7.	"The Reason Why"		5:20
8.	"Strike a Light"		4:46
9.	"Rock Me On Your Wave"		7:21
10.	"Heartstream" (Bonus track on 2003 reissue)	House	3:23
Total length:			48:12

== Personnel ==
- Tony Hill - vocals, guitars, bass
- Simon House - electric violin, keyboards, drum machine, mandolin, bass
