= Hawkwind, Friends and Relations =

Compilation album by Hawkwind

Compilation album by Hawkwind
- Released: March 1982
- Genre: Space rock
- Label: Flicknife Records

Hawkwind chronology
The Weird Tapes (1983)	Hawkwind, Friends and Relations (1982)	The Text of Festival (1983)

Professional ratings
Review scores
Source	Rating
The Encyclopedia of Popular Music	1/5 stars

Hawkwind, Friends & Relations: Twice Upon a Time

Compilation album by Hawkwind
- Released: April 1983

Professional ratings
Review scores
Source	Rating
The Encyclopedia of Popular Music	2/5 stars

Hawkwind, Friends & Relations (Vol. 3)

Compilation album by Hawkwind
- Released: April 1985

Professional ratings
Review scores
Source	Rating
The Encyclopedia of Popular Music	2/5 stars

The Best of Hawkwind, Friends and Relations

Compilation album by Hawkwind
- Released: March 1993

Professional ratings
Review scores
Source	Rating
The Encyclopedia of Popular Music	3/5 stars

Hawkwind, Friends & Relations: The Rarities

Compilation album by Hawkwind
- Released: March 1995

Professional ratings
Review scores
Source	Rating
The Encyclopedia of Popular Music	3/5 stars

Hawkwind, Friends & Relations, Vol. 6: Cosmic Travellers

Compilation album by Hawkwind
- Released: April 1996

The Hawkwind, Friends and Relations series of albums was released in the early 1980s containing live and studio performances by Hawkwind and related bands.

It was released through the independent record company Flicknife Records, with the rights subsequently sold onto Cherry Red who continue to release packages through their Anagram label comprising this and other Hawkwind related material originally released by Flicknife Records.

In 2011, Flicknife Records released a new volume in the series, under the name Hawklords Friends and Relations.

Hawkwind's label Cherry Red Records released a new volume of the series in 2026.

A review of the first installment in Record Business magazine called it "An album for the many dedicated Hawkfans."

== Volume 1 ==
1. "Who's Gonna Win The War?" (Brock) - Hawkwind, Live '78
2. "Golden Void" (Brock) - Sonic Assassins, Live '77
3. "Robot" (Brock) - Hawkwind, Live '77
4. "Raj Neesh" - Inner City Unit, 1982
5. "Good Girl, Bad Girl" (Moorcock, Pavli) - Michael Moorcock's Deep Fix, 1982
6. "Valium Ten" (Bainbridge, Brock) - Hawkwind, 1978
7. "Human Beings" - Inner City Unit, 1982
8. "Time Centre" (Moorcock, Pavli) - Michael Moorcock's Deep Fix, 1982

== Volume 2 – Twice Upon A Time ==
1. "Earth Calling" (Calvert) – Hawkwind, London Sundown 30-Dec-1972
2. "We Do It" (Hawkwind) – Hawkwind, BBC session 19-Apr-1971
3. "Spirit of the Age" (Calvert, Brock) – Hawkwind, Leicester 29-Sep-1977
4. "The Changing" (Bainbridge) – Harvey Bainbridge, 1983
5. "Phone Home Elliot" (Turner, Bainbridge, Brock) – Uncle Nik & The ETs, 1983
6. "Work" (Strange, Griffin) – Richard Strange featuring Martin Griffin, 1983
7. "The Man with the Golden Arm" (Elmer Bernstein, Sylvia Fine) – Nik Turner, 1983
8. "Motherless Children" (Traditional) – Dave Brock, 1983

== Volume 3 ==
1. "Psychedelia Lives" (Hawkwind) – Hawkwind, Glastonbury 1981
2. "Drug Cabinet Key" [aka "Flying Doctor"] (Calvert, Brock) – Hawklords, Uxbridge 1978
3. "Wired for Sound" [aka "Earthed to the Ground"] (Brock) – Dave Brock, 1984
4. "Widow Song" (Calvert) – Robert Calvert, 1984
5. "Toad On The Road" (N. Alman, Waki Gumbo Jr) – Alman Mulo Band, 1984
6. "When The Going Gets Tough" (Brock) – Dave Brock, 1983
7. "Vampire" (Pavli, Theaker) – Stravinsky Shoe, 1984
8. "Canes Venatici" (Rix, Rix) – Underground Zerø, 1983

== The Best of Hawkwind, Friends and Relations ==
1. "Spirit Of The Age" – Hawkwind – from Volume 2
2. "Raj Neesh" – Inner City Unit – from Volume 1
3. "Robot" – Hawkwind – from Volume 1
4. "Canes Venatici" – Underground Zerø – from Volume 3
5. "Dodgem Dude" – Michael Moorcock's Deep Fix
6. "Golden Void" – Sonic Assassins – from Volume 1
7. "Lord Of The Hornets" – Robert Calvert
8. "Motherless Children" – Dave Brock – from Volume 2
9. "Sweet Mistress Of Pain" – Hawkwind Zoo
10. "Social Alliance" – Hawkwind- from Zones
11. "Outside The Law" – Lloyd Langton Group
12. "Time Centre" – Michael Moorcock – from Volume 1
13. "Vampire" – Stravinsky Shoe – from Volume 3
14. "Over the Top" – Sonic Assassins
15. "Space Invaders" – Inner City Unit
16. "Psi Power" – Hawkwind – from This Is Hawkwind, Do Not Panic

== Hawkwind, Friends and Relations: The Rarities ==
1. "Aimless Flight" – Underground Zerø
2. "Psychedelia Lives" – Hawkwind – from Volume 3
3. "Working Time" – Lloyd Langton Group
4. "Rainbow Warrior" – Underground Zerø
5. "Brothel in Rosenstrasse" – Michael Moorcock's Deep Fix
6. "Toad On The Road" – Alman Mulo Band – from Volume 3
7. "Earth Calling" – Hawkwind- from Volume 2
8. "The Changing" – Harvey Bainbridge – from Volume 2
9. "The Widow Song" – Robert Calvert – from Volume 3
10. "Starcruiser" – Michael Moorcock
11. "I.C.U." – Inner City Unit
12. "I See You" – Lloyd Langton Group
13. "Human Beings" – Inner City Unit
14. "Atom Bomb"- Atomgods
15. "Phone Home Elliot" – Uncle Nik and The ETs – from Volume 2

== Hawkwind Friends and Relations Volume 6 – Cosmic Travellers ==
1. "The Right Stuff" – Pressurehead
2. "Between Worlds" – Underground Zerø
3. "We Do It" – Hawkwind – from Volume 2
4. "Grid Co/ordinate Vorp One" – Anubian Lights
5. "Time Of The Hawklords" – Hawklords
6. "Venusian Skyline" – Melting Euphoria
7. "The Master" – Helios Creed
8. "A Trip To G9" – Spiral Realms
9. "Seeing Strange Lights" – Dark Matter
10. "Pre Cambrian Shuffle" – The Brain
11. "Space Does Not Care" – Zero Gravity

== Hawklords Friends and Relations: A New Dawn The 30th Anniversary ==
1. "Digital Age" – Earthlab
2. "Fly Into The Night" – Gunslinger
3. "Robot" - (live) – Hawklords
4. "Felice" – Underground Zero
5. "My Secret Buddha" – DanMingo
6. "Outlaw" – Steve Swindells
7. "The Naked and Transparent Man" – Bob Calvert
8. "Make Believe It Real" - Spirits Burning
9. "Stream" – Harvey Bainbridge
10. "Vision Quest" – Bedouin
11. "Angel Down" – Alan Davey

== Hawkwind, Friends & Relations Vol 6 ==
1. "We Fight For Glory" – Hawkwind
2. "The Watcher" – Technicians of Spaceship Hawkwind
3. "The 10th Second of Forever" – Martin Krel
4. "Storm Brewing" – Storm Brewing
5. "Billy Hilly" – Dave Brock
6. "Salute" – Thighpaulsandra
7. "Merry Go Round" – The Stone Ryders
8. "Contemplation" – Dave Brock
9. "Thought for the Day" – Barkus
10. "Meeting Eve" – Dave Brock
11. "Hiraeth" – Storm Brewing
12. "The Co-Pilot" – Hawkwind
13. "Aero Space Age Inferno" – Technicians of Spaceship Hawkwind
14. Car B1 – Dave and Richard
15. "The Angelica Declaration" – Thighpaulsandra

== Release history ==
- Volume 1: LP, Mar-1982, Flicknife Records, SHARP101
- Volume 2: LP, Apr-1983, Flicknife Records, SHARP107
- Volume 3: LP, Apr-1985, Flicknife Records, SHARP024
- Best Of: CD, Mar-1993, Anagram Records/Flicknife Records, CDMGRAM61
- The Rarities: CD, Mar-1995, Anagram Records/Flicknife Records, CDGRAM91
- Volume 6: Apr-1996, CD, Anagram Records/Flicknife, CDGRAM105
- Best Of And The Rarities: Dec-2001, 2CD, Anagram Records, CDGRAM152
- Hawklords, Friends and Relations: The 30th Anniversary Volume: 2011, CD, Flicknife Records SHARPCD11051
- Hawkwind, Friends & Relations Vol 6: 7th August 2026, CD and 2LP, Cherry Red Records BRED954
