= Live 1990 (Hawkwind album) =

Live album by Hawkwind

Live album by Hawkwind
- Released: 3 June 2002
- Recorded: Leicester De Montfort Hall, 5 November 1990 and Nottingham, Lenton Lane Studios, 25 January 1990
- Genre: Space rock
- Label: Voiceprint Records – HAWKVP12CD

Hawkwind chronology
Atomhenge 76 (2000)	Live 1990 (2002)

Professional ratings
Review scores
Source	Rating
Allmusic	3/5 stars
The Encyclopedia of Popular Music	2/5 stars

Live 1990 is a 2002 live album release of two 1990 concerts by Hawkwind.

The first concert, making up CD1 and the first three tracks from CD2, was recorded on their Winter 1990 tour, 30 minutes of which had previously been issued in Italy as a CD accompanying the Never Ending Story of the Psychedelic Warlords book. The remainder is composed of the soundtrack to the filmed concert performance which is also available on the Nottingham video.

== Track listing ==
CD1

1. "Karnac Intro" (Hawkwind) – 7:16
2. "Angels of Death" (Brock) – 4:24
3. "Golden Void" [listed as "Void of Golden Light"] (Brock) – 8:00
4. "Ejection" (Calvert) – 10:52
5. "Wings" (Davey) – 6:33
6. "Out of the Shadows" (Buckley, Brock, Davey) – 7:01
7. "Snake Dance" (Hawkwind) – 2:48
8. "Night of the Hawks" (Brock) – 5:57
9. "Seventh Star" (Wishart, Hawkwind) – 5:43
10. "T.V Suicide" (Bainbrdge) – 5:15

CD2

1. "Back in the Box" (Wishart, Hawkwind) – 11:46
2. "Hassan-i-Sabah" [listed as "Assassins Of Allah"] (Calvert, Rudolph) – 4:47
3. "Images" (Wishart, Brock, Davey) – 9:12
4. "Assault and Battery" [listed as "Lives of Great Men"] (Brock) – 3:52
5. "Golden Void" [listed as "Void of Golden Light"] (Brock) – 6:13
6. "Out of the Shadows" (Buckley, Brock, Davey) – 7:33
7. "Snake Dance" (Hawkwind) – 3:08
8. "Night of the Hawks" (Brock) – 4:45
9. "Seventh Star" (Wishart, Hawkwind) – 2:48
10. "Back in the Box" (Wishart, Hawkwind) – 6:37
11. "Arrival in Utopia" [listed as "Utopia"] (Moorcock, Brock) – 2:19
12. "Ejection" (Calvert) – 6:38
13. "Damnation Alley" (Calvert, Brock, House) / "Your Secret's Safe With Me" (Wishart, Hawkwind) – 8:00

== Personnel ==
Hawkwind

- Bridget Wishart – vocals
- Dave Brock – guitar, keyboards, vocals
- Harvey Bainbridge – keyboards, vocals
- Alan Davey – bass guitar, vocals
- Simon House – violin (Lenton Lane session only)
- Richard Chadwick – drums
