= Steve Swindells =

English musician (born 1952)

- Born: 21 November 1952 (age 73); Ipswich, Suffolk, England
- Genres: Rock; space rock; psychedelic rock; hard rock
- Occupations: Singer–songwriter; musician; poet; journalist; producer; writer; painter; photographer
- Instruments: Vocals; keyboards
- Years active: 1973–present
- Labels: RCA; Atomhenge/Cherry Red; Esoteric Recordings

Steve Swindells (born 21 November 1952) is an English singer-songwriter, keyboardist, party organiser, club promoter and journalist.

== Life and career ==
=== Early life ===
Swindells grew up in the Bath and Bristol area, dropping out of art college to play keyboards with the rock band Squidd (which was put together by drummer and fantasy artist, Rodney Matthews). Relocating to London in 1973 and living in squats, he recorded his debut solo album, Messages for RCA in 1974. Produced by his manager Mark Edwards, Swindells felt the production quality to be poor, despite the presence of quality musicians. A follow-up album Swindells' Swallow was recorded, mastered, and test pressings were manufactured, but the deal fell through.

Departing from his manager, Swindells joined Pilot, recording the 1977 album Two's a Crowd. In 1978, he joined a reformed Hawkwind, renamed as Hawklords, for the 25 Years On album and tour.

=== 1980s ===
In 1980, he recorded another solo album, Fresh Blood, released by ATCO, but was dropped when it failed to hit sufficient sales, despite reaching No. 3 in the US airplay charts. Swindells would go on contribute songs to Roger Daltrey on "Martyrs and Madmen" and "Treachery" for Daltrey's 1982 compilation album Best Bits, before temporarily turning his attention away from the music business. In 1983, Swindells switched careers to club promoting and party organising.

=== 1990s ===
In the early 1990s, he decided to re-invent himself as a journalist, writing the internet column for Time Out under the name Spyder for many years, as well as a gadget/lifestyle column for Attitude, before becoming the editor of the magazine's website. Throughout his career changes, Swindells continued to compose and perform music.

=== 2000s ===
In 2003, Swindells played keyboards and sang lead vocals in the band Danmingo together with Jerry Richards, Jon Moss and Winston Blissett. Swindells wrote all of the songs, apart from two band collaborations and one co-write with Stephen Meade (aka Shanks) and the late Kent Brainerd. As of 10 December 2013, Swindells had been number 1 on the 'Reverb Nation Singer-songwriter Chart For London' for several days. He then released the double download DanMingo album under his own name.

In 2009, Swindells was instrumental in the formation (or reformation) of the Hawklords, a musical collective of ex-Hawkwind members, playing a special show in memory of artist Barney Bubbles. The show was advertised as 'a benefit concert with a view to setting up a foundation/annual award for innovative album cover design, and a memorial plaque for him.' However, there is no evidence that the proceeds of the concert were used for any of these purposes.

=== 2010–present ===
In 2010, Hawklords performed a mini-tour of the UK. In 2011, the group were active in several appearances across the UK, and a touring line-up underwent a full national tour in October 2011. In 2012, they announced they were working on an album titled 'We Are One'. In May 2012, via the band's Facebook page, it was announced that, for health reasons, Swindells would not be participating in the planned 2012 tour and subsequently ended his involvement with the band.

Swindells re-discovered two 'lost' albums from 1980: The Invisible Man, and Treachery. They were released on Flicknife Records on 27 February 2012. His 1980 album Fresh Blood was released on CD for the first time on the label Atomhenge/Cherry Red in August 2009. His 1974 album Messages, along with a bonus CD of the hitherto unreleased Swindells' Swallow, was re-released by Esoteric Recordings/Atomhenge on 26 November 2009.

Early in 2012, Swindells put together an ad-hoc 'all-star' jamming band called 'The Plastic Sturgeons'. Special guest musicians have included Guy Pratt and Dale Davis. There have been only two gigs to date, recorded by Roy Weard. As of 10 December 2013, The Plastic Sturgeons have been number 1 in The Reverb Nation London Jam Chart for several weeks.

== Discography ==
=== As solo artist ===
- Messages (1974)
- Fresh Blood (1980)
- The Lost Albums (Double CD) (released 27 February 2012 on Flicknife Records).
- New Crescent Yard (2011)
- The Hanging Baskets Of Babylon
- DanMingo

=== With Pilot ===
- Two's a Crowd (1977)

=== With Hawklords (1970s band) ===
- 25 Years On (1978)
- Weird Tape 1 (1980)
- Weird Tape 2 (1980)
- Weird Tape 4 (1981)
- Hawkwind, Friends and Relations Volume 1 (1982)
- Hawkwind, Friends and Relations Volume 3 (1985)
- Hawkwind Anthology Volume 1 (1985)
- Hawkwind Anthology Volume 2 (1986)
- Hawklords Live (1992)
- Hawkwind, Friends and Relations Volume 6 (1996)
- Levitation 2009 re-master (first 5 bonus tracks on disc 1) (2009)
- Live '78 (2009)

=== With Hawklords (2000s band) ===
- Robert Calvert Memorial Concert, Kings Hall, Herne Bay, 28 September 2008 (2009)
- Sonic Rock Solstice 2010 (various artists) (2010)
- Barney Bubbles Memorial Concert (2011)
- We Are One (2012)

=== Other album appearances ===
- Capdevielle Les Enfants Des Ténèbres Et Les Anges De La Rue (1979)
- Spirits Burning & Bridget Wishart Earth Born (2008)
- Spirits Burning & Bridget Wishart Bloodlines (2009)
