= Web Weaver =

Web Weaver may refer to:

- "Web Weaver" (song), a song from the 1974 album Hall of the Mountain Grill by Hawkwind
- Web-Weaver (Cooper Coen), a gay superhero created in 2022 by Marvel Comics
