= Underground Zerø =

British space rock band

- Origin: Norwich, Norfolk, England, United Kingdom
- Genres: Space rock, progressive rock, hard rock, heavy metal
- Years active: 1979–1994; 2005–present
- Label: Flicknife
- Members: Judi Griggs; Adrian Rix; Paul Holden; Sean Holden; Andrew Rix; Karl Dawson

Underground Zerø is a British space rock band, based in Norfolk, UK. The band is also known as UZØ. While the band is often referred to as "Underground Zero" or "Underground Zer0" in print, the official name of the band includes the slashed zero in its name. Their sound is influenced by Hawkwind, with heavy guitar solos, and lyrics based on dystopian science fiction, fantasy and social commentary.

The band was started in 1979 by Andrew Rix (bass/vocals), Adrian Rix (keyboards), Judi Griggs (vocals), Brian Savage (drums) and Karl Dawson (guitar). From 1981, then known as Ground Zero, the group underwent several major changes. Brian left and was replaced by Mike (Mel) Melnyk and guitarist Paul Holden joined. In 1983 Mel left and was replaced by Sean Holden. The band featured on the UKs Tommy Vance’s Friday Rock Show on Radio 1 and during 1983-85 developed a large following in the new Psychedelic scene. At this point the name became Underground Zerø to avoid confusion with a R & B group in the London Area. They performed at the large open-air concert Anglia for Africa in Norwich in 1985, which also featured Hawkwind, Magnum, Amazulu, Eek-A-Mouse and Dean Friedman. Underground Zerø also performed at the last Stonehenge festival with Hawkwind and has featured on Hawkwind, Friends and Relations albums. Although UZØ never split up they stopped performing live in 1994.

In 2005, they resumed live performances, doing 3 gigs in the UK and released a CD, Powerplay, featuring remixed versions of the studio tracks from their two vinyl LPs plus one bonus track. At about the same time an unofficial CD entitled Never Reach the Stars appeared, containing the original mixes of all the tracks from their vinyl albums and single. Although this release was not officially sanctioned it does include three live and one studio tracks that are not on the official CD and is acknowledged on the band's website.

Performances include the 2006 Eastern Haze Festival in Somerleyton Hall, UK. 2008 saw them perform alongside Hawkwind at Hawkfest, at Honiton in Devon. They regularly feature at Space Rock festivals such as "On Board The Craft" and "Jackdaw".

In November 2014, founder keyboardist Adrian Rix left the band, and their planned 2015 appearances at HawkEaster and Sonic Rock Solstice were cancelled.

In 2016, Robert Fielder joined the band as keyboardist.

In 2017, the band released Hunting Dogs on March 15 and made an appearance at Hawkwind's Hawkeaster festival. Some of the songs on Hunting Dogs date from the 1980s and may have been recorded then but not previously released.

In 2026, 47 years after the conception of the band, Underground Zerø are still together today with the same original members from the early years. Although UZØ are no longer performing live, the band are still recording together.

== Discography ==
- 1983. Ground Zerø. Cassette.
- 1983. The Official Bootleg. Live Cassette. (featuring Hawkwind's Nik Turner).
- 1984. Seven Light Years. 12" Single.
- 1984. Never Reach the Stars. LP. Sharp 023. Flicknife Records.
- 1985. Hawkwind, Friends and Relations 3.Sharp 024.Flicknife Records.
- 1985. A Street Tape named desire. Cassette. Norwich Venue Campaign, Compilation of Norwich Bands.
- 1986. Orbit 9. Cassette. Terry Hopkins.
- 1986. Orbit 10. Interview/Fanzine Cassette. HT 111. Terry Hopkins.
- 1986. A Pretty Smart Way to Catch a Lobster. Live Alice in Wonderland Compilation LP. Sharp 035. Flicknife Records.
- 1986. A Pretty Smart Way to Catch a Lobster. Live Alice in Wonderland Compilation Cassette. Sharp 035C. Flicknife Records.
- 1986. A Pretty Smart Way to Catch a Lobster. Live Alice in Wonderland Japanese Import LP CBS/Sony Inc. 28AP3268
- 1986. Hawkfan 12. Compilation LP. by Brian Tawn
- 1986. Through The Looking Glass. Live/Studio EP. Blunt 038. Flicknife Records.
- 1987. Underground Zerø Live. Video. Under 002
- 1988. The Best of Hawkwind, Friends and Relations. CD. Sharp 1724CD. Flicknife Records.
- 1988. Never Reach the Stars. LP. ASLE 0010. ASPA Records Spain.
- 1994. From Year Zerø. CD. Under 003
- 1993 The Best of Hawkwind, Friends and Relations. CD. Anagram Records – CD M GRAM 61
- 1994 The Best of Hawkwind, Friends and Relations. CD. Emporio - EMPRCD 547 Re-release
- 1994 The Best of Hawkwind, Friends and Relations. Cassette – EMPRMC547 Re-release
- 1995 The Best of Hawkwind, Friends and Relations. CD. Griffin Music – GCD 535-2 USA
- 1995. Hawkwind, Friends and Relations - The Rarities. Compilation CD. CDMGRAM 91. Anagram.
- 1995 Hawkwind, Friends and Relations - The Rarities. Compilation CD Griffin Music – GCD-523-2 USA
- 1995. Forlorn & Lethal. Video. Under 004
- 1996. Hawkwind, Friends and Relations - Cosmic Travellers. CD. CDMGRAM 105 Anagram. Pinnacle.
- 1999. The Elf & The Hawk CD BWRCD 026-2 Black Widow
- 2005. Powerplay. CD. Under 005
- 2005. Never Reach The Stars + CD BR187 Black Rose Records
- 2007. A Pretty Smart Way to Catch a Lobster. Live Alice in Wonderland Reissue CD. Mad Man Records – MAMA019
- 2011. Hawklords, Friends And Relations: 30th Anniversary Volume - A New Dawn. CD. SHARPCDA11951. Flicknife Records
- 2012 Hawkwind, Friends & Relations - Cosmic Travellers Vol. 6 Japanese Import CD Octave – OTCD-2535
- 2014 Hawkwind – The Flicknife Years • 1981-1988 Box set Compilation Atomhenge – ATOMCD 51039
- 2017. Hunting Dogs, © Copyright - Underground Zero / Underground Zero (5029385843625) ASIN: B06XCJJ1QC
- 2022. Dave Brock Presents, This Was Your Future - Space Rock (And Other Psychedelics) 3xCD 1978 - 1998 Cherry Red CRCDBOX122
- 2024 Hawkwind – The Flicknife Years • 1981-1988 Box set Compilation Japan Import Solid Records – CDSOL-71775
