= High Tide (band) =

English rock band

- Origin: Northampton, Northamptonshire, England
- Genres: Progressive rock; psychedelic rock; heavy metal
- Years active: 1969–1970; 1989–1990
- Label: Liberty
- Past members: Tony Hill (died 2022); Simon House (died 2025); Peter Pavli; Roger Hadden

High Tide were an English rock band formed in 1969 by Tony Hill (previously of The Misunderstood, guitar and vocals), Simon House (violin and keyboards), Peter Pavli (bass guitar) and Roger Hadden (drums). They released two studio albums under their own name for Liberty Records and one as backing musicians for Denny Gerrard. They broke up in 1970 after little critical or commercial success. Tony Hill's vocals/vocal stylings are strongly reminiscent of The Doors' Jim Morrison.

In the 1980s and 1990s, Hill used the name for new recordings and releases, using some members of the original group plus new personnel. There have also been additional releases of previously unavailable recordings from the original group.

Guitarist and vocalist Tony Hill died on December 8, 2022.

== History ==
=== Original inception ===
High Tide made their first recordings as the backing band on Denny Gerrard's album Sinister Morning. Gerrard returned the favour by producing their first album, Sea Shanties, which was released in October 1969. Though it met with a scathing review in Melody Maker, reviews in the underground press were universally positive, and sales were just enough to convince Liberty to give the green light to a second album.

This second album, High Tide, was released the following year. A third album was being recorded in 1970, but Roger Hadden, who had been suffering from chronic mental instability and depression since before joining High Tide, had a mental breakdown and was hospitalized before the album could be finished. Unable to continue without Hadden, the group split up.

=== Later activity ===
During the late 1970s, Hill and House recorded Interesting Times as a duo, taking turns playing bass and using a drum machine to replace Roger Hadden. The album featured heavy use of synthesizers, which to an extent supplanted the use of House's violin. The album was originally released as a mail order cassette, and issued on vinyl and CD in 1989 and 1990.

Any possibilities of further recordings from this semi-reunion were dissolved when House rejoined Hawkwind in 1990. However, under the encouragement of drummer Drachen Theaker, Hill pushed out no less than five albums under the High Tide banner by the end of the following year, starting with two discs of retrospective material, and then with three albums recorded by an entirely new band.

The first retrospective release, Precious Cargo, consists of sessions recorded in 1970 by the original group, but their exact nature is not specified. It has been theorized, however, that they are the rehearsal sessions for their unfinished third album. One song, "The Great Universal Confidence Trick" (mislabeled on the album as "Exploration"), had been recorded for Sea Shanties but went unreleased at the time due to space constraints. None of the other six songs were used in any earlier recordings.

The second retrospective album, The Flood, is a collection of demos of various origins. It includes four demos recorded by the original High Tide shortly before their breakup, six demos recorded in 1971 and 1976 by Tony Hill and Peter Pavli with other musicians, and a Peter Pavli solo demo from 1979.

The new band which recorded the remaining High Tide albums consisted of Tony Hill (guitars and bass), Dave Tomlin (violin and bass), and Drachen Theaker (drums), though various guest musicians also contributed, including a few appearances by Peter Pavli and Simon House. Eschewing the tight, complex compositions which were the staple of the original High Tide, the new band's albums Ancient Gates and The Reason of Success consisted almost solely of lengthy improvised performances with little to no compositional basis. Between these two albums was released A Fierce Nature. Tony Hill wrote all the songs on A Fierce Nature and played everything but the drums.

In 2000 a two disc compilation album was released, titled Open Season. However, with the exceptions of a new Tony Hill solo track, a new Peter Pavli solo track, and a short track from Ancient Gates, the content was drawn entirely from The Flood and The Reason of Success. In 2004 the tracks "Futilist's Lament" and "Blankman Cries Again" appeared on the CD re-package of the United Artists Records sampler All Good Clean Fun (Liberty 8660902), but High Tide did not appear on the original 1971 2LP. In September 2023, Esoteric released The Complete Liberty Recordings, a 3CD compilation in a clamshell box with the first two albums and a third disc titled Demos & Studios Sessions 1969 & 1970.

== Musical style ==
Allmusic author, Wilson Neate, stated of the group, "High Tide had the muscularity of a no-nonsense proto-metal band, but they also ventured into prog territory with changing time signatures and tempos, soft-hard dynamics, multi-part arrangements, and even some ornate faux-Baroque interludes".

== Discography ==
=== Studio albums ===
- Sea Shanties (1969)
- High Tide (1970)
- Interesting Times (1986)
- Precious Cargo (1989) sessions recorded in 1970 - reissues have labelled it as "Live jam 1970"
- A Fierce Nature (1990)
- Ancient Gates (1990)
- The Reason of Success (1991)

=== Compilation albums ===
- The Flood (1990) previously unreleased recordings from 1970 to 1971 and later in the 1970s
- Open Season (2000)
- The Complete Liberty Recordings (2023)
