= Kerb Crawler =

Single by Hawkwind

from the album Astounding Sounds, Amazing Music
- B-side: "Honky Dorky"
- Released: 16 July 1976
- Recorded: February 1976
- Studio: Roundhouse Studios
- Genre: Space rock
- Length: 3:45
- Label: Charisma
- Songwriter: R. Calvert/D. Brock
- Producer: Hawkwind

Hawkwind singles chronology
"Kings of Speed" (1975)	"Kerb Crawler" (1976)	"Back on the Streets" (1977)

"Kerb Crawler" is a 1976 song by the UK rock group Hawkwind. It was originally released as a single in the UK (CB289) on 16 July 1976 taken from the album Astounding Sounds, Amazing Music.

There are reportedly two versions of the A-side, the original mix and a remix by David Gilmour, although the latter is the most common and the version that appeared on the album. The B-side, "Honky Dorky", is the band jamming on the middle section of "Reefer Madness".
