= The Weird Tapes =

Compilation album by Hawkwind
- Released: March 1980 – November 1983
- Recorded: 1966–1982
- Genre: Space rock
- Labels: Weird Tapes, Voiceprint

Hawkwind chronology
The Weird Tapes (1980)	Hawkwind, Friends and Relations (1982)

The Weird Tapes are a set of music tapes by the English rock group Hawkwind. Issued in the early 1980s, they contain live, radio sessions, out-take and demo performances.

Dave Brock collated this material from his own private library and issued them as 40 minute TDK cassette tapes on his own Weird imprint through Geoff Hocking. The first tape (101) was made available through mail order at the beginning of 1980, whilst the last tape (108) was first issued at the end of 1983. When Brock hooked-up with Rob Ayling of Voiceprint Records at the end of 1999, this material was re-released on CD without alteration.

== Volume 1: Sonic Assassins / Dave Brock ==
Professional ratings
Review scores
Source	Rating
The Encyclopedia of Popular Music	3/5 stars

=== Track listing ===
1. "Over the Top" (Robert Calvert, Dave Brock) – 7:53
2. "Magnu"/"Angels of Life" (Brock) – 4:23
3. "Freefall" (Calvert, Harvey Bainbridge) – 7:54
4. "Death Trap" (Calvert, Brock) – 4:30
5. "Nuclear Toy" [a.k.a. "Nuclear Drive"] (Brock) – 4:21
6. "Who's Gonna Win the War" (Brock) – 5:55
7. "The Dream" (Brock) – 1:21
8. "Assassination" [aka "Some People Never Die"] (Brock) – 3:34
9. "The Dream II" (Brock) – 0:26
10. "Satellite" [a.k.a. "The Phenomenon of Luminosity"] (Brock) – 2:49

=== Credits ===
- Tracks 1–4: Sonic Assassins, Barnstaple 23 December 1977: Robert Calvert; Dave Brock; Harvey Bainbridge; Paul Hayles; Martin Griffin. Included on 2009 re-mastered 25 Years On 2CD.
- Tracks 5,7–10: Dave Brock demos 1979.
- Track 6: Hawklords, Rockfield Studios 1979: Dave Brock; Harvey Bainbridge; Steve Swindells; Simon King. Included on 2009 re-mastered Levitation CD.

== Volume 2: Hawkwind Live / Hawklords Studio ==
Professional ratings
Review scores
Source	Rating
The Encyclopedia of Popular Music	3/5 stars

=== Track listing ===
1. "Quark, Strangeness and Charm" (Calvert, Brock) – 2:38
2. "Master of the Universe" (Nik Turner, Brock) – 4:44
3. "Welcome to the Future" (Calvert) – 2:10
4. "Spirit of the Age" (Calvert, Brock) – 5:57
5. "Sonic Attack" (Michael Moorcock) – 5:27
6. "Valium 10" (Brock, Bainbridge, Steve Swindells, Simon King) – 7:51
7. "Douglas in the Jungle (Ode to A Manager)" (Brock, Bainbridge, Swindells, King) – 6:53
8. "Time of the Hawklords" (Brock, Bainbridge, Swindells, King) – 4:07

=== Credits ===
- Tracks 1–5: Stonehenge Free Festival 21 June 1977, and New Theatre Oxford 30 September 1977: Robert Calvert; Dave Brock; Adrian Shaw; Simon House; Simon King. Track 1 included on 2009 re-mastered PXR5 CD. Track 4 included on 2009 re-mastered Quark, Strangeness and Charm 2CD.
- Tracks 6–8: Hawklords, Rockfield Studios 1979: Dave Brock; Harvey Bainbridge; Steve Swindells; Simon King. Included on 2009 re-mastered Levitation CD.

== Volume 3: Hawkwind Free Festivals ==
Professional ratings
Review scores
Source	Rating
The Encyclopedia of Popular Music	2/5 stars

=== Track listing ===
1. "High Rise" (Calvert, Simon House) – 5:37
2. "Damnation Alley" (Calvert, Brock, House) – 8:00
3. "Uncle Sam's on Mars" (Calvert, Brock, House, King) / "The Iron Dream" [unlisted] (King) – 6:33
4. "Robot" (Calvert, Brock) – 7:21
5. "Cake Out" [a.k.a. "Hash Cake"] (Hawkwind) – 4:44
6. "Circles" (Turner, Brock, Paul Rudolph, Alan Powell) – 4:29
7. "Elements" [a.k.a. "I Am the Eye"] (Turner, Brock, Rudolph, Powell) – 4:26
8. "Slap It on De Table" (Hawkwind) – 0:50

=== Credits ===
- Tracks 1–4: Recorded on the Autumn tour 1977: Robert Calvert; Dave Brock; Adrian Shaw; Simon House; Simon King. Track 1 included on 2009 re-mastered Quark, Strangeness and Charm 2CD.
- Tracks 5&8: Rockfield Studios, January 1977: Dave Brock; Paul Rudolph; Simon House; Simon King. Track 5 included on 2009 re-mastered Quark, Strangeness and Charm 2CD as "Hash Cake Cut."
- Tracks 6&7: Watchfield Festival 23 August 1975: Dave Brock; Paul Rudolph; Nik Turner; Alan Powell. Both tracks included on 2013 remastered Warrior on the Edge of Time 2CD+DVD-A and Box Set.

== Volume 4: Hawklords Live 1978 ==
Professional ratings
Review scores
Source	Rating
The Encyclopedia of Popular Music	2/5 stars

=== Track listing ===
1. "Death Trap" (Calvert, Brock) – 6:21
2. "Age of the Micro Man" (Calvert, Brock) – 3:40
3. "Spirit of the Age" (Calvert, Brock) – 9:25
4. "Urban Guerilla" (Calvert, Brock) – 5:18
5. "Steppenwolf" (Calvert, Brock) – 9:07
6. "Freefall" (Calvert, Bainbridge) – 5:28
7. "Uncle Sam's on Mars" (Calvert, Brock, House, King) – 6:28
8. "The Iron Dream" [unlisted] (King) – 2:05

=== Credits ===
- Hawklords, Plymouth Polytechnic 23 November 1978: Robert Calvert; Dave Brock; Harvey Bainbridge; Steve Swindells; Martin Griffin.

== Volume 5: Hawkwind Live 1976–77 ==
Professional ratings
Review scores
Source	Rating
The Encyclopedia of Popular Music	3/5 stars

=== Track listing ===
1. "Back on the Streets" (Calvert, Rudolph) – 3:50
2. "Chronoglide Skyway" [incorrectly listed as "City of Lagoons"] (House) – 5:09
3. "Brainstorm" (Turner) – 7:25
4. "Wind of Change" (Brock) – 4:07
5. "Assassins of Allah" [a.k.a. "Hassan I Sabbah"] (Calvert, Rudolph) – 7:17
6. "Forge of Vulcan" (House) – 2:33
7. "Steppenwolf" (Calvert, Brock) – 10:29
8. "Where Are They Now?" (Brock) – 2:19

=== Credits ===
- Tracks 1–2: Hammersmith Odeon, 5 October 1976: Robert Calvert; Dave Brock; Paul Rudolph; Nik Turner; Simon House; Alan Powell; Simon King.
- Track 3, 4: Croydon, Fairfields Hall, 25 September 1977: Robert Calvert; Dave Brock; Adrian Shaw; Simon House; Simon King.
- Tracks 5, 6: probably taken from Hammersmith Odeon, 5 October 1977: Robert Calvert; Dave Brock; Adrian Shaw; Simon House; Simon King.
- Track 7: Leicester DeMontfort (frequently misspelled as DeMontford) Hall, 3 October 1977: Robert Calvert; Dave Brock; Adrian Shaw; Simon House; Simon King.
- Track 8: unknown.

== Volume 6: Hawkwind Live 1970–73 ==
=== Track listing ===
1. "Make What You Can" (Brock) – 7:11
2. "Born to Go" (Calvert, Brock) – 5:05
3. "Master of the Universe" (Turner, Brock) – 7:18
4. "Seeing It As You Really Are" [listed as "Jam"] (Hawkwind) – 3:25
5. "Hurry on Sundown" (Brock) – 4:49
6. "Come Home" [a.k.a. "Some of That Stuff"] (Hawkwind) – 2:11
7. "We Do It" (Hawkwind) – 10:35
8. "Earth Calling" (Calvert) – 3:28

=== Credits ===
- Track 1: studio 1973: Dave Brock; Lemmy; Nik Turner; Del Dettmar; Dik Mik; Simon King.
- Tracks 2–4: The Roundhouse, 12 February 1972: Robert Calvert; Dave Brock; Lemmy; Nik Turner; Del Dettmar; Dik Mik; Simon King. Included on 2007 re-mastered Greasy Truckers Party 3CD.
- Tracks 5–6: BBC Radio 1 session, Maida Vale Studios, 18 August 1970: Dave Brock; Thomas Crimble; Nik Turner; Dik Mik; Terry Ollis; Huw Lloyd-Langton.
- Track 7: BBC Radio 1 In Concert, Paris Cinema, London, 5 November 1970: Dave Brock; Thomas Crimble; Nik Turner; Dik Mik; Terry Ollis.
- Track 8: Brixton Sundown, 30 December 1972: Robert Calvert; Dave Brock; Lemmy; Nik Turner; Del Dettmar; Dik Mik; Simon King.

== Volume 7: Dave Brock Demos ==
=== Track listing ===
1. "Welcome to the Dream Machine" [unlisted] (Brock) – 0:19
2. "Streets of Fear" (Brock) – 4:18
3. "First Landing on Medusa" [a.k.a. "The Church"] (Brock) – 3:14
4. "Touchdown" (Brock) – 1:56
5. "Winter of Discontent" (William Shakespeare, Brock) – 2:41
6. "Outer Limits" [unlisted] (Brock) – 1:03
7. "Choose Your Masks" (Moorcock, Brock) – 4:58
8. "Looking in the Future" (Brock) – 3:39
9. "Space Travellers" (Brock) – 2:36
10. "Disintegration" [unlisted] (Brock) – 1:06
11. "Circles" (Brock) – 6:25
12. "Speed of Light" [a.k.a. "Transdimensional Man"] (Brock) – 5:40
13. "Bombed Out" (Brock) – 4:08
- Note: the CD issue, although listed as above, is re-sequenced with tracks 6–13 followed by tracks 1–5. Also, tracks 2 and 3 on the CD are the same (Looking in the Future) 4 sec. difference.

=== Credits ===
- Dave Brock demos, 1980–82.

== Volume 8: Live 1966–73 ==
=== Track listing ===
1. "Space Is Deep" (Brock) – 8:05
2. "Down on Her Knees" (Brock) – 5:58
3. "Live and Let Live" (Brock) – 4:07
4. "Etchanaty" (Brock) – 3:21
5. "Roll 'Em Pete" (Big Joe Turner, Pete Johnson) – 2:15
6. "Come On" (unknown) – 2:25
7. "Dealing With the Devil" (Sonny Boy Williamson II) – 2:10
8. "Bring It On Home" (Willie Dixon) – 3:11
9. "You Know You're Only Dreaming" (Brock) / "You Shouldn't Do That" (Turner, Brock) – 12:00

=== Credits ===
- Track 1: although stated to be Brixton Sundown, 30 December 1972, it is actually Liverpool Stadium, 22 December 1972: Robert Calvert; Dave Brock; Lemmy; Nik Turner; Del Dettmar; Dik Mik; Simon King.
- Tracks 2–4: Unknown.
- Tracks 5–8: pre-Hawkwind Dave Brock 1966–69. Track 8 included on 1996 re-mastered Hawkwind CD.
- Tracks 9: BBC Radio 1 session, Maida Vale Studios, 19 May 1971: Dave Brock; Dave Anderson; Nik Turner; Dik Mik; Terry Ollis.

== Release details ==
- Volume 1: Cassette, Mar-1980, Weird Records, WEIRD101; CD, Sep-2000, Voiceprint Records, HAWKVP6CD
- Volume 2: Cassette, Oct-1980, Weird Records, WEIRD102; CD, Sep-2000, Voiceprint Records, HAWKVP7CD
- Volume 3: Cassette, Oct-1980, Weird Records, WEIRD103; CD, Sep-2000, Voiceprint Records, HAWKVP8CD
- Volume 4: Cassette, Jun-1981, Weird Records, WEIRD104; CD, Sep-2000, Voiceprint Records, HAWKVP9CD
- Volume 5: Cassette, Sep-1981, Weird Records, WEIRD105; CD, Sep-2000, Voiceprint Records, HAWKVP10CD
- Volume 6: Cassette, Oct-1982, Weird Records, WEIRD106; CD, Sep-2000, Voiceprint Records, HAWKVP11CD
- Volume 7: Cassette, Oct-1982, Weird Records, WEIRD107; CD, Sep-2000, Voiceprint Records, HAWKVP14CD
- Volume 8: Cassette, Nov-1983, Weird Records, WEIRD108; CD, Mar-2006, Voiceprint Records, HAWKVP36CD
