= Jonathan Smeeton =

British lighting and production designer

Jonathan Smeeton is a British lighting and production designer who was active in the UK from the late 1960s, and then in the US from late 1970s up to his retirement in 2018.

Smeeton started out in the UK underground scene in the late 1960s. By 1971, he had become involved with Hawkwind, using the alias Liquid Len and the Lensmen (a reference to the Lensman space opera books), and remained with them for seven years developing his craft.

He was name-checked in the Genesis song "The Battle of Epping Forest" from Selling England by the Pound (1973), later going on to work for the band's singer Peter Gabriel:

And his friend, Liquid Len by name,
Of wine, women and Wandsworth fame

He's name-checked a second time in the same song : "And Liquid Len, with his smashed bottle men is lobbing Bob the Nob across the gob"

He retired from the business in April 2018, his last official show being for Diana Ross and the LA Philharmonic at the Hollywood Bowl in June 2018. In 2018, he received the Parnelli Visionary Award.

List of acts he has worked for:

- 1970s: Bob Hope; War; Captain Beefheart; Free; Traffic; Hawkwind; Motörhead; Fairport Convention; Black Sabbath; The Commodores; Frank Zappa; Average White Band; Van Morrison; Colosseum II; Peter Gabriel.
- 1980s: REO Speedwagon; Al Jarreau; WHAM!; Journey; Graham Nash; Rod Stewart; The Pointer Sisters; Tina Turner; Mike Oldfield; Jefferson Airplane; Sheila E; Mike and the Mechanics; Yoko Ono; The Thompson Twins; The Pet Shop Boys; Peter Gabriel; Amnesty International; Tears for Fears; George Michael; Paul Simon; Lou Reed; Miles Davis.
- 1990s: Robert Gallup – Extreme Magic [Fox Television]; Sinéad O'Connor; Phil Collins; Stone Roses; Barry White (video); TLC [video]; Kylie Minogue; Toni Braxton [video]; Def Leppard; Dwight Yoakam; Billy Idol; Adam Sandler [HBO]; Peter Gabriel; Jane's Addiction; The Human League; Yes; Jim Brickman; Chris Isaak; Sammy Hagar; Bryan Ferry; Richie Sambora.
- 2000s: ELO [PBS Television Special]; Jim Brickman [PBS Television Special]; Marilyn Manson; Jim Brickman; Chris Isaak; Deftones; 3 Doors Down; Plus One; Electric Light Orchestra; Incubus; Sammy Hagar; Miranda Lambert; Keith Urban; Jack Ingram; Great American Country Television; Joe Satriani – G3; Asia Sounds, Film and Television; Kids on Stage Summer Academy.
- 2010s: Kenny "Babyface" Edmonds; Gloriana; Kellie Pickler; Taylor Swift; Bridgit Mendler; Toni Braxton; MAGIC!; Yes/ARW (Jon Anderson, Trevor Rabin, Rick Wakeman); Michael McDonald; Diana Ross.

== See also ==
- Barney Bubbles
