= New Worlds Fair =

Studio album by Michael Moorcock & The Deep Fix
- Released: March 1975
- Recorded: 1974/5
- Genre: Psychedelic rock
- Label: United Artists Records

Michael Moorcock & The Deep Fix chronology
New Worlds Fair (1975)	The Entropy Tango & Gloriana Demo Sessions (2008)

Professional ratings
Review scores
Source	Rating
Allmusic	4/5 stars

New Worlds Fair is a 1975 concept album by UK rock group Michael Moorcock & The Deep Fix.

The brainchild of science-fiction author Michael Moorcock, bassist Steve Gilmore, and guitarist Graham Charnock, Fair featured a host of guest players, among them members of Hawkwind and guitarist Snowy White. In one review, it is described as a concept album.

Moorcock had contributed lyrics to Hawkwind and occasionally performed with them. In 1974, he was offered a record deal by Andrew Lauder, Hawkwind's A&R man for United Artists Records, although Moorcock insisted that his compatriots Steve Gilmore and Graham Charnock should have significant input into the album.

The single "Dodgem Dude"/"Starcruiser" had been recorded just prior to the album, but United Artists passed on the idea of releasing it. Some time later as Moorcock was visiting his former manager Douglas Smith, with whom he was in dispute, he discovered the tapes for the single lying around the office. Without Smith's knowledge he took them, passing them onto Frenchy Gloder, who gave the single a belated release on his Flicknife Records label (FLS200, December 1980).

The album has received multiple re-releases featuring various bonus tracks, in 1995 on Griffin (USA) and Dojo (UK), and in 2008 on Esoteric (UK). In 2004, Voiceprint Records released an alternate version of the album as Roller Coaster Holiday.

== Track list ==
=== Side one ===
1. "Candy Floss Cowboy" (Michael Moorcock)
2. "Fair Dealer" (Moorcock)
3. "Octopus" (Steve Gilmore)
4. "Sixteen Year Old Doom" (Moorcock)
5. "You're A Hero" (Graham Charnock)
6. "Song For Marlene" (Sam Shepard/Gilmore)

=== Side two ===
1. "Come To The Fair" (Charnock)
2. "In The Name Of Rock And Roll" (Charnock)
3. "Ferris Wheel" (Gilmore)
4. "Last Merry Go Round" (Moorcock)
5. "Dude's Dream (Rolling In The Ruins)" (Moorcock)

=== 2007 bonus tracks ===
1. "Dodgem Dude" (Moorcock)
2. "The Brothel In Rossenstrasse" (Moorcock/Pavli)
3. "Starcruiser" (Moorcock)
4. "Candy Floss Cowboy" (Demo) (Moorcock)
5. "Kings Of Speed" (Previously Unreleased) (Moorcock)
6. "You're A Hero" (Demo - Previously Unreleased) (Moorcock)
7. "Dodgem Dude" (First Demo - Previously Unreleased) (Moorcock)

=== 1995 version ===
1. "Candy Floss Cowboy" (narration) (Moorcock) – 1:20
2. "Candy Floss Cowboy" (demo) (Moorcock) – 4:26
3. "Fair Dealer" (Moorcock) – 5:07
4. "Narration 1" (Moorcock) – 0:34
5. "Octopus" (Gilmore) – 2:27
6. "16 Year Doom" (Moorcock) – 4:16
7. "You're a Hero" (intro) (Moorcock) – 0:12
8. "You're a Hero" (Charnock) – 3:11
9. "Song For Marlene" (intro) (Moorcock) – 0:17
10. "Song For Marlene" (Shepard/Gilmore) – 5:09
11. "Dodgem Dude" (Moorcock) – 2:45
12. "Come to the Fair" (Charnock) – 1:20
13. "Starcruiser" (Moorcock) – 3:14
14. "Narration 3" (Moorcock) – 0:24
15. "In the Name of Rock and Roll" (Charnock) – 4:07
16. "Narration 4" (Moorcock) – 0:32
17. "Ferris Wheel" (Gilmore) – 5:56
18. "Narration 5" (Moorcock) – 0:19
19. "Last Merry Go Round" (Moorcock) – 2:11
20. "Dude's Dream" (narration) (Moorcock) – 0:14
21. "Dude's Dream" (Moorcock) – 4:42
22. "Brothel in Rosenstrasse" (Moorcock/Peter Pavli) – 3:44

=== Roller Coaster Holiday ===
1. "Candy Floss Cowboy" (Moorcock) – 4:39
2. "Fair Dealer" (Moorcock) – 5:28
3. "Octopus" (Gilmore) – 2:27
4. "Sixteen Year Old Doom" (Moorcock) – 4:28
5. "You're a Hero" (Charnock) – 4:16
6. "Song for Marlene" (Gilmore, Shepard) – 4:22
7. "Dodgem Dude" (Moorcock) – 3:03
8. "Come to the Fair" (Charnock) – 1:24
9. "Starcruiser" (Moorcock) – 3:19
10. "In the Name of Rock and Roll" (Charnock) – 4:34
11. "Ferris Wheel" (Gilmore) – 5:30
12. "Last Merry-Go-Round" (Moorcock) – 2:24
13. "Dude's Dream (Rolling in the Ruins)" (Moorcock) – 5:00
14. "Candy Floss Cowboy" (early workout) (Moorcock) – 6:04
15. "Starcruiser" (instrumental) (Moorcock) – 3:43
16. "Dude's Dream" (acoustic different lyrics) (Moorcock) – 5:15

== Personnel ==
- Michael Moorcock – Guitar, Mandolin, Vocals
- Graham Charnock – Guitar, Vocals
- Steve Gilmore – Guitar, Vocals
- Kuma Harada – Bass
- Peter Pavli – Cello

with

- Snowy White – Guitar
- Herbert North – Guitar
- Nik Turner – Saxophone
- Dave Brock – Guitar
- Simon House – Violin, Keyboards
- Simon King – Drums
- Alan Powell – Drums
- Shirley Roden – Vocals
- Debi Ross – Vocals

== Credits ==
- Recorded: Jackson's Studios & Pye Studios, London 1974–1975, also at Majestic Studio Clapham, and Olympic, Barnes.
- Cover: Barney Bubbles

== Release history ==
- March 1975: UK, United Artists (UAG 29732), vinyl
- March 1995: USA, Griffin Music(GCD 332 2), CD Box Set with hardback book "Death Is No Obstacle"
- May 1995: UK, Dojo Records (DOJOCD 088), CD
- 8 November 2004: Roller Coaster Holiday, UK, Voiceprint Records (VP351CD), CD
- January 2008: UK, Esoteric Records (ECLEC 2026), CD
