= Choose Your Masques: Collectors Series Volume 2 =

Live album by Hawkwind
- Released: 8 November 2009
- Recorded: Hammesmith Odeon, 11–13 November 1982
- Genre: Space rock
- Label: Voiceprint Records – HAWKVP3CD

Hawkwind chronology
Glastonbury 90 (1999)	Choose Your Masques: Collectors Series Volume 2 (2009)	Complete '79: Collectors Series Volume 1 (1999)

Professional ratings
Review scores
Source	Rating
AllMusic	link

Choose Your Masques: Collectors Series Volume 2 is a 2000 live album release of most of a pair of 1982 concerts by the English rock band Hawkwind. It was recorded during the winter 1982 tour at the Hammersmith Odeon in London, mostly on 12 November, with some tracks possibly from 13 November. The recording features a guest slot from Michael Moorcock on 12 November. Note the final actual set list, compared to the released double-CD, and all songs where Nik Turner's contribution could be removed, have been, almost certainly due to continuing legal wrangles.

In December 2014, Cherry Red advertised a re-release on its website as follows:

"In 1982 Hawkwind released the album "Choose Your Masques" on RCA ACTIVE, their final release for the label and considered the finest of this era by many fans. The album would feature a line-up of DAVE BROCK, HARVEY BAINBRIDGE, HUW LLOYD LANGTON and MARTIN GRIFFIN and contained such excellent material as 'Arrival in Utopia', 'Solitary Mind Games', 'Choose Your Masques', 'Waiting for Tomorrow' and 'Dream Worker'. The album was a Top Thirty success upon its release and spawned a memorable tour on which the band was joined by returning member NIK TURNER."

The band’s concerts at Hammersmith Odeon in London in November 1982 were perhaps the highlight of this memorable tour and were recorded on 24-track tape by a mobile recording unit. The recordings were mixed as rough monitor mixes and appeared on various ensuing compilations throughout the 1980s and beyond. All the surviving multi-track masters have now been gathered together and have now been mixed as this stunning 2 CD set, presented in the best audio quality to date."

Titled "Coded Languages - Live at Hammersmith Odeon 1982", Cherry Red have re-instated the entire setlist, including "Ghost Dance", "Steppenwolf" and "Warrior on the Edge of Time", and all in the correct running order, but the encore has been omitted.

== Track listing ==
CD1

1. "Choose Your Masques" (Moorcock/Brock) – 5:27
2. "Coded Languages" (Moorcock/Bainbridge) – 5:37 (possibly from 13th nov)
3. "Magnu" (Brock) – 4:39
4. "Dust of Time" (Brock/Lloyd-Langton/Bainbridge) – 3:28
5. "Warriors at the Edge of Time" (Moorcock/Hawkwind) – 4:07
6. "Waiting For Tomorrow" (Lloyd-Langton) – 4:31
7. "Angels of Death" (Brock) – 5:55
8. "Psychedelic Warlords" [listed as "Psychedelic Warrior"] (Brock) – 6:53
9. "Utopia" (Brock) – 7:24
10. "Social Alliance" (Brock) – 2:01

CD2

1. "Arrival in Utopia" (Moorcock/Brock) – 6:00
2. "Solitary Mind Games" (Lloyd-Langton) – 5:50
3. "Dreamworker" (Bainbridge) – 2:13
4. "Brainstorm" (Turner) – 13:01
5. "Ejection" (Calvert) – 2:41
6. "Shot Down in the Night" (Swindells) – 2:25
7. "Master of the Universe" (Turner/Brock) – 3:31

== Additional tracks from the same Hammersmith Odeon gig, released on Out & Intake ==
1. "Ghost Dance" (Turner, Bainbridge) – 3:47 (Not on main CD)
2. "Warrior on the Edge of Time / The Scan" (Moorcock) – 3:33 (Intro is not on Main CD in its entirety)
3. "Coded Languages" (this is different to the main CD, in that it definitely has Moorcock on vocals too.

== Cherry Red 2014 release of "Coded Languages - Live at Hammersmith Odeon 1982" ==
1. "Warrior on the Edge of Time / The Scan / Choose Your Masques"
2. "Coded Languages"
3. "Magnu - Dust of Time"
4. "Waiting for Tomorrow"
5. "Angels of Death"
6. "Ghost Dance"
7. "Steppenwolf"
8. "Psychedelic Warlords"
9. "Social Alliance"
10. "Utopia - Arrival in Utopia"
11. "Solitary Mind Games"
12. "Sonic Attack"
13. "Dream Worker"
14. "Brainstorm"

== Songs from the same tour, recorded at Bristol Colston Hall, released on Zones ==
1. "Utopia 84" (again crudely spliced to run straight into Social Alliance)
2. "Social Alliance"
3. "Sonic Attack" (omitted from main CD above)
4. "Dream Worker" (a complete version)
5. "Brainstorm"

== Actual set list from 12 November ==
1. "Warrior on the Edge of Time / The Scan" (this was re-ordered for the CD release and crudely cropped)
2. "Choose Your Masques"
3. "Coded Languages" (alternative version released on Out and Intake)
4. "Magnu"
5. "Dust of Time"
6. "Waiting for Tomorrow"
7. "Angels of Death"
8. "Ghost Dance" (on Out & Intake only, but not on main CD - Nik Turner lead vocals)
9. "Steppenwolf" (not released - Nik Turner is on lead vocals)
10. "Psychedelic Warlords"
11. "Social Alliance"
12. "Utopia" (end is removed due to re-ordering the live CD)
13. "Arrival in Utopia"
14. "Solitary Mind Games"
15. "Sonic Attack" (not released - again Nik Turner on lead vocals)
16. "Dream Worker" (beginning is missing due to re-ordering of CD)
17. "Brainstorm"
18. "Ejection"
19. "Shot Down in the Night"
20. "Master of the Universe"

== Personnel ==
Hawkwind

- Dave Brock – guitar, keyboards, vocals
- Huw Lloyd-Langton – guitar, vocals
- Nik Turner – saxophone, flute, vocals
- Harvey Bainbridge – bass guitar, keyboards, vocals
- Martin Griffin – drums
