= Alan Powell (drummer) =

British musician (born 1948)

Alan Powell (born James Alan Powell 1948, Middleton, Lancashire) is a British musician.

In 1964 Alan joined the Manchester R&B band Ivans Meads who released their first single "The Sins of a Family" for EMI in October 1965, followed by "We'll Talk About It Tomorrow" in September 1966. The band split in 1967.

His first notable appearances were with Chicken Shack, appearing on the 1974 live album Goodbye, and Vinegar Joe ("Proud To Be a Honky Woman"). He continued his friendship with Robert Palmer from Vinegar Joe co-writing "Gotta Get a Grip on You, Part 2" (from Some People Can Do What They Like (1976)), "The Silver Gun" (from Pride (1983)) "Jealous" released as a single from the album Secrets and "Life in Detail" also released as a single, (from the soundtrack to Pretty Woman (1990)).

During 1974, he joined Hawkwind as a second drummer, recording two albums, Warrior on the Edge of Time (1975) and Astounding Sounds, Amazing Music (1976), and contributed to Hawkwind collaborator Michael Moorcock's 1975 album New Worlds Fair. On leaving Hawkwind, he sessioned on Nik Turner's 1978 album Xitintoday.

In 1977, he formed the short-lived touring band Kicks with Paul Rudolph (Hawkwind), Steve York (Vinegar Joe) and Cal Batchelor (Quiver), then teamed up with Mick Farren for the "Screwed Up" EP (1977) and Vampires Stole My Lunch Money (1978). In 1978, he formed Tanz Der Youth with The Damned leader Brian James, released the single "I'm Sorry, I'm Sorry"/"Delay", recorded a Peel Session, toured with Black Sabbath and appeared at Turner's 'Bohemian Love-In' event.

At the end of the 1970s he emigrated to San Francisco, and fronted his own new wave band, Jo Allen and the Shapes, releasing the 1980 single "Cryin' Over You"/"Lowlife" and "Shimmy, Shimmy" on the 415 Music compilation album.

During the 1990s he re-united with some of his former Hawkwind colleagues for several North American tours, which resulted in the 1995 live album and video Space Ritual Revisited and a 1996 studio album Past or Future.
