= Hawkwind Anthology =

Compilation album series by Hawkwind

Anthology Volume I

Compilation album by Hawkwind
- Released: 4 November 1985
- Recorded: Various: 1967-1982
- Genre: Space rock
- Label: Samurai Records

Hawkwind chronology
Space Ritual Volume 2 (1984)	Anthology Volume I (1985)	Out & Intake (1987)

Anthology Volume II

Compilation album by Hawkwind
- Released: June 1986

Anthology Volume III

Compilation album by Hawkwind
- Released: June 1986

Professional ratings
Review scores
Source	Rating
The Encyclopedia of Popular Music	3/5 stars

Professional ratings
Review scores
Source	Rating
The Encyclopedia of Popular Music	3/5 stars

Professional ratings
Review scores
Source	Rating
The Encyclopedia of Popular Music	2/5 stars

The Hawkwind Anthology series of records were originally issued mid-1980s containing live and outtake material from Hawkwind's career to that date.

Dave Brock compiled the package, essentially a best of The Weird Tapes, for release on the Samurai imprint. It was released as three separate discs and also as a picture disc box set including an interview disc. It was subsequently licensed to receiver records and eventually sold to Castle Communications who have released as an extended set.

"Because there was so much compilation and re-released material about, Jim White thought it would be a good idea to bring together a catalogue of all our own stuff that we liked, in the hope of stopping all that. But we never got any royalties out of the Anthology sets we did with them, and as far as we know they've sold around 66,000 of that triple set. Then he sold the catalogue onto various companies." - Dave Brock (Record Collector, January 1993)

== Track listing ==
Volume 1

1. "High Rise" (Calvert/House) – 5:35 – Hawkwind, Leicester 29 September 1977
2. "British Tribal Music" (Brock/Bainbridge/Swindells/King) – 3:57 – Hawklords, Rockfield Studios 1979
3. "Spirit of the Age" (Calvert/Brock) – 8:00 – Hawkwind, Live November 1979
4. "Urban Guerilla" (Calvert/Brock) – 6:25 – Hawkwind, Live November 1979
5. "Master of the Universe" (Turner/Brock) – 3:27 – Hawkwind, Lewisham Odeon 18 December 1980
6. "World of Tiers" (Bainbridge/Lloyd-Langton) – 5:19 – Hawkwind, Lewisham Odeon 18 December 1980
7. "Who's Gonna Win The War?" (Brock) – 4:50 – Hawkwind, Glastonbury Festival 1981
8. "Ghost Dance" (Hawkwind) – 5:31 – Hawkwind, Live 1982

Volume 2

1. "Earth Calling" (Calvert) – 2:11 – Hawkwind, London Sundown 30 December 1972
2. "Motorhead" (Kilmister) – 3:04 – Hawkwind, Olympic Studios 5–6 January 1975
3. "You Shouldn't Do That" (Turner/Brock) – 11:46 – Hawkwind, Watchfield Festival August 1975
4. "Magnu"/"Angels of Life" (Brock) – 4:20 – Sonic Assassins, Barnstaple 23 December 1977
5. "Hash Cake" (Hawkwind) – 4:44 – Hawkwind, Studio 1976?
6. "Quark, Strangeness and Charm" (Calvert/Brock) – 2:35 – Hawkwind, Chicago, 11 March 1978
7. "Douglas in the Jungle (Ode to a Manager)" (Brock/Bainbridge/Swindells/King) – 6:45 – Hawklords, Rockfield Studios 1979

Volume 3

1. "Dealing with the Devil" (Sonny Boy Williamson II) – 2:10 – pre-Hawkwind Dave Brock 1967
2. "Bring It On Home" (Willie Dixon) – 3:11 – pre-Hawkwind Dave Brock 1967
3. "Hurry on Sundown" (Brock) – 4:47- Hawkwind, BBC Session 18 August 1970
4. "Come Home" (Hawkwind) – 2:08 – Hawkwind, BBC Session 18 August 1970
5. "We Do It" (Hawkwind) – 10:31 – Hawkwind, BBC In Concert 5 November 1970
6. "Born To Go" (Calvert/Brock) – 5:02 – Hawkwind, Roundhouse 12 February 1972
7. "Space Is Deep" (Brock) – 8:30 – Hawkwind, London Sundown, 30 December 1972
8. "You Shouldn't Do That" (Brock/Turner) / "Seeing It As You Really Are" (Hawkwind) – 10:57 – Hawkwind, London Sundown, 30 December 1972

Bonus tracks on Anthology 1967-1982

1. "Silver Machine" (Calvert/Brock) – from Live Seventy Nine
2. "Time We Left (This World Today)" (Brock) / "Heads" (Neville-Neil/Brock) – from Palace Springs
3. "Needle Gun" (Brock) – from Live Chronicles
4. "Wastelands of Sleep" (Tait/Brock) – from The Xenon Codex
5. "Out of the Shadows" (Buckley/Brock/Davey) – from Space Bandits
6. "Gimme Shelter" (Jagger/Richards) – from It is the Business of the Future to be Dangerous
7. "Right to Decide" (Brock/Davey) – from Electric Tepee

== Release details ==
- Volume 1: LP, Nov-1985, Samurai Records, SAMR038
- Volume 2: LP, Jun-1986, Samurai Records, SAMR039
- Volume 3: LP, Jun-1986, Samurai Records, SAMR040
- Acid Daze (The History of Hawkwind): 3LP/2CD, Apr-1990, Receiver Records, RRBX1
- Anthology 1967-1982: 2CD, Sep-1998, Castle Communications, ESDCD664
