= Simon House =

British musician (1948–2025)

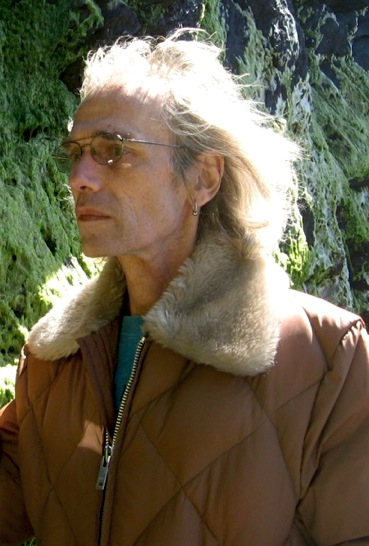
- House in 2008

Background information
- Born: 29 August 1948
- Died: 25 May 2025 (aged 76)
- Genres: Progressive rock; space rock; Art rock
- Occupation: Musician
- Instruments: Violin; keyboards
- Years active: 1969-2025
- Formerly of: Hawkwind; High Tide; Third Ear Band

Simon House (29 August 1948 – 25 May 2025) was an English violinist, composer and keyboardist best known for his work with proto-metal band High Tide and space rock band Hawkwind, as well as a composer for films, including the 1971 adaptation of Macbeth.

== Life and career ==
Before his time with Hawkwind, House played in High Tide and the Third Ear Band, who contributed the soundtrack to Roman Polanski's Macbeth. Guitarist Tony Hill recounted how House became a member of High Tide: "[Pete Pavli and I were] hanging out with and crashing where we could at Mike's or Wayne's. Simon ended up crashing there as well. Simon was playing bass then. He said: 'I used to play violin, you know?' So I said 'Get it!' That was basically it."

He joined Hawkwind in 1974. He left the group for David Bowie's band in 1978.

Along with other Hawkwind members he was a session musician for science fiction author Michael Moorcock's New Worlds Fair in 1975, and also played on solo projects by former Hawkwind members Robert Calvert and Nik Turner.

From the 1970s onward, House cut an album (Interesting Times) with Tony Hill under the High Tide banner; released several solo albums under his own name; and twice rejoined Hawkwind – between 1989 and 1991, and between 2001 and 2003.

House died on 25 May 2025, at the age of 76.

== Discography ==
=== High Tide ===
- Sea Shanties (1969)
- High Tide (1970)
- Interesting Times (1986)
- Precious Cargo (1989)
- The Flood (1990)

=== Denny Gerrard ===
- Sinister Morning (1970)

=== Third Ear Band ===
- Music from Macbeth (1972)
- The Magus (recorded 1972, released 2004)

=== Hawkwind ===
- Hall of the Mountain Grill (1974)
- Warrior on the Edge of Time (1975)
- Astounding Sounds, Amazing Music (1976)
- Quark, Strangeness and Charm (1977)
- PXR5 (1979)
- Lord of Light (1987)
- Space Bandits (1990)
- Palace Springs (1991)
- Live in Nottingham 1990 (2004)
- Anthology, 1967-1982 (1998)
- Stasis: The U.A. Years, 1971-1975 (2003)
- Yule Ritual (2002)
- Canterbury Fayre 2001 (2002)
- The Weird Tapes No. 5: Live '76 & '77 (2001)

=== Michael Moorcock & The Deep Fix ===
- New Worlds Fair (1975)

=== Robert Calvert ===
- Lucky Leif and the Longships (1975)
- Hype: Songs of Tom Mahler (1981)
- Revenge

=== David Bowie ===
- Stage (1978)
- Lodger (1979)
- Sound + Vision (2001)
- Welcome to the Blackout (recorded in 1978) (2018)

=== Japan ===
- Gentlemen Take Polaroids (1980)
- Tin Drum (1981)
- Gentlemen Take Polaroids/Tin Drum/Oil on Canvas (1994)
- Exorcising Ghosts (2004)

=== David Sylvian ===
- Everything and Nothing (2000)

=== Thomas Dolby ===
- She Blinded Me With Science (1982)
- The Golden Age of Wireless [re-released version] (1982)
- The Best of Thomas Dolby: Retrospectacle (1994)

=== Mike Oldfield ===
- "Crises" (1983) [2013 Deluxe Edition only]
- The Complete Mike Oldfield (1985)

=== Magic Muscle ===
- One Hundred Miles Below (1989)
- Gulp (1991)

=== Nik Turner ===
- Prophets of Time (1994)
- Transglobal Friends and Relations (2000)
- Space Gypsy (2013)
- Life In Space (2017)

=== Simon House ===
- Yassasim (1995)
- Spiral Galaxy Revisited (2005)

=== Simon House with Rod Goodway ===
- House of Dreams (2002)

=== Spiral Realms ===
- A Trip to G9 (1994)
- Crystal Jungles of Eos (1995)
- Solar Wind (1996)
- Ambient Voids: A Hypnotic Compilation (1995)

=== Anubian Lights ===
- The Eternal Sky (1995)
- Jackal & Nine (1996)

=== Ambient Time Travellers ===
- Ambient Time Travellers (1995)

=== Adrian Shaw ===
- Head Cleaner (2000)

=== Bedouin ===
- As Above So Below (2001)

=== Earth Lab ===
- Element (2006)

=== Judy Dyble ===
- Enchanted Garden (2004)
- Spindle (2006)
- The Whorl (2006)

=== Astralasia ===
- Cluster of Waves (2007)
- Away With the Fairies (2007)

=== Spirits Burning ===
- Earthborn (2008)
- Bloodlines (2009)

=== Nektar ===
- A Spoonful of Time (2008)

=== Alan Davey ===
- Eclectic Devils (2009)
