= List of Hawkwind band members =

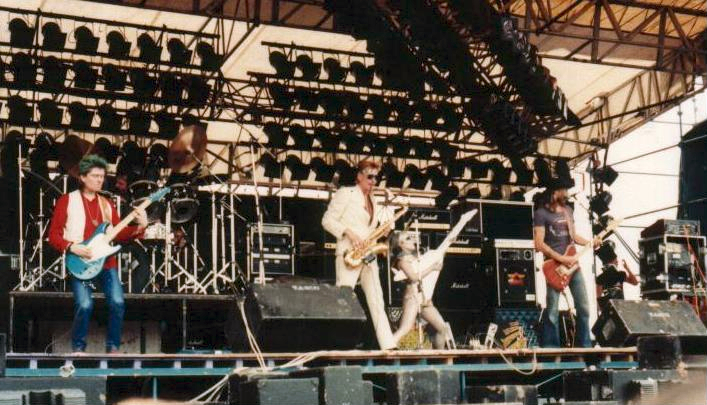
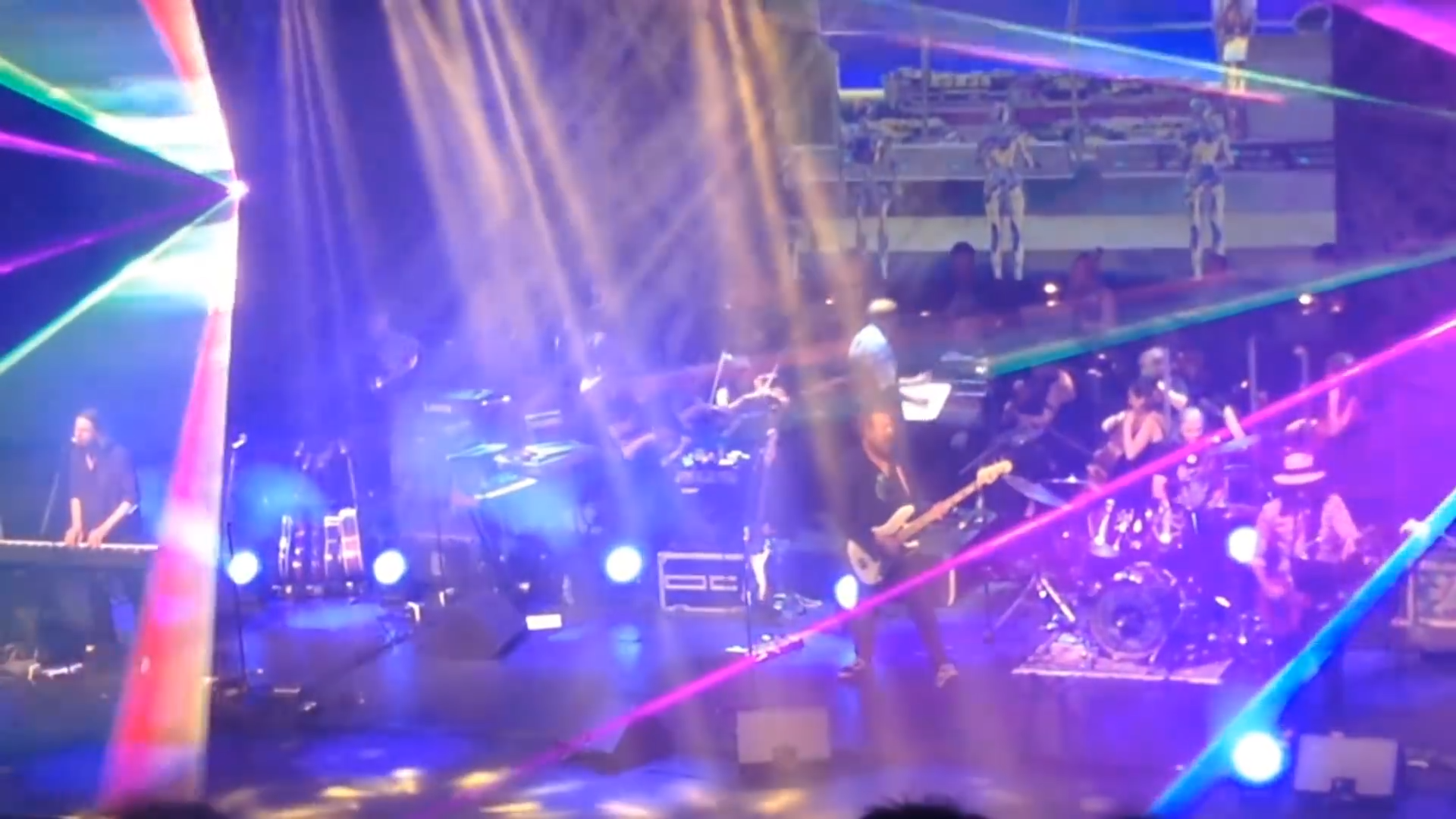
Two line-ups of Hawkwind performing in 1982 and 2018

Hawkwind are an English space rock band formed in London in 1969 when singer and guitarist Dave Brock met bass player John Harrison. The first incarnation of the group also included lead guitarist Mick Slattery and drummer Terry Ollis, who were soon joined by friends Nik Turner and Dik Mik Davies on saxophones and electronics respectively.

The group have been operative ever since, with only a one-year break when they surfaced under the alternate name Hawklords. Personnel changes have been regular and numerous, almost on a yearly basis, with only Brock being an ever-present.

Band members with significant recording careers outside of Hawkwind include Huw Lloyd-Langton, Robert Calvert, Lemmy Kilmister, Simon House, Paul Rudolph, Adrian Shaw, Steve Swindells, Tim Blake, Ginger Baker and Alan Davey.

Hawkwind also credited non-musician members of their crew, such as lighting engineer Jonathan Smeeton (known as Liquid Len); dancers Stacia, Renée LeBallister, Tony Crerar and Julie Murray-Anderson; lyricist and occasional guest Michael Moorcock. Hawkwind's distinctive graphic design in the 1970s was created by Barney Bubbles.

== History ==
=== 1969–1976 ===
Dave Brock and Mick Slattery had been in the London-based psychedelic band Famous Cure, and a meeting with bassist John Harrison revealed a mutual interest in electronic music which led the trio to embark upon a new musical venture together. Seventeen-year-old drummer Terry Ollis replied to an advert in a music weekly, while Nik Turner and Michael "Dik Mik" Davies, old acquaintances of Brock, offered help with transport and gear, but were soon pulled into the band.

An Abbey Road session took place recording demos of "Hurry on Sundown" and others (included on the remasters version of Hawkwind), after which Slattery left to be replaced by Huw Lloyd-Langton, who had known Brock from his days working in a music shop selling guitar strings to Brock, then a busker. The Pretty Things' guitarist Dick Taylor was brought in to produce the 1970 debut album Hawkwind.

Their use of drugs, however, led to the departure of Harrison, who did not partake, to be replaced briefly by Thomas Crimble (about July 1970 – March 1971). Crimble played on a few BBC sessions before leaving to help organise the Glastonbury Free Festival 1971; he sat in during the band's performance there. Lloyd-Langton also quit, after a bad LSD trip at the Isle of Wight Festival led to a nervous breakdown.

Their follow-up album, 1971's In Search of Space, brought greater commercial success, reaching number 18 on the UK album charts. This album offered a refinement of the band's image and philosophy courtesy of graphic artist Barney Bubbles and underground press writer Robert Calvert, as depicted in the accompanying Hawklog booklet, which would be further developed into the Space Ritual stage show. Science fiction author Michael Moorcock and dancer Stacia also started contributing to the band. Dik Mik had left the band, replaced by sound engineer Del Dettmar, but chose to return for this album giving the band two electronics players. Bass player Dave Anderson, who had been in the German band Amon Düül II, had also joined and played on the album but departed before its release because of personal tensions with some other members of the band. Anderson and Lloyd-Langton then formed the short-lived band Amon Din. Meanwhile, Ollis quit, unhappy with the commercial direction the band were heading in.

The addition of bassist Ian "Lemmy" Kilmister and drummer Simon King propelled the band to greater heights. Dik Mik departed during 1973 and Calvert ended his association with the band to concentrate on solo projects. Dettmar also indicated that he was to leave the band, so Simon House was recruited as keyboardist and violinist playing live shows, a North America tour and recording the 1974 album Hall of the Mountain Grill. Dettmar left after a European tour and emigrated to Canada, whilst Alan Powell deputised for an incapacitated King on that European tour, but remained giving the band two drummers.

At the beginning of 1975, the band recorded the album Warrior on the Edge of Time in collaboration with Michael Moorcock, loosely based on his Eternal Champion figure. However, during a North American tour in May, Lemmy was caught in possession of amphetamine crossing the border from the US into Canada. The border police mistook the powder for cocaine and he was jailed, forcing the band to cancel some shows. Fed up with his erratic behaviour, the band dismissed the bass player replacing him with their long-standing friend and former Pink Fairies guitarist Paul Rudolph. Lemmy then teamed up with another Pink Fairies guitarist, Larry Wallis, to form Motörhead, named after the last song he had written for Hawkwind.

=== 1976–1986 ===
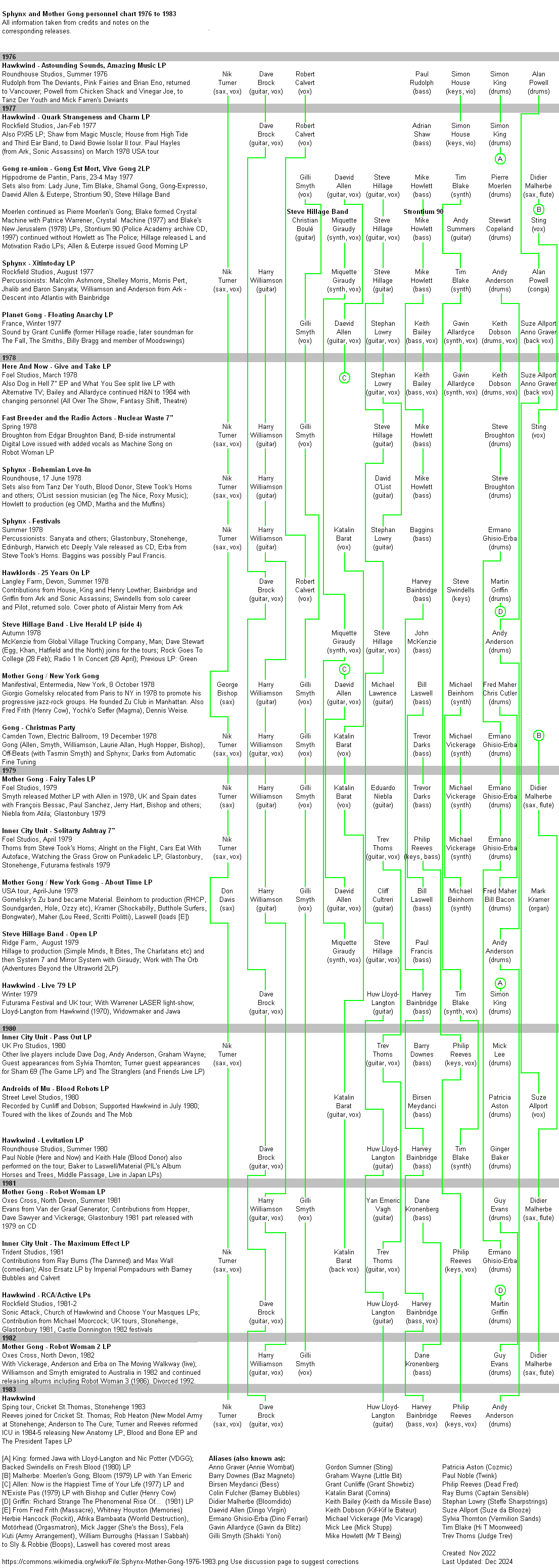
Hawkwind and Gong related personnel chart 1976 to 1983

Calvert made a guest appearance with the band for their headline set at the Reading Festival in August 1975, after which he chose to rejoin the band as a full-time lead vocalist. Stacia chose to relinquish her dancing duties and settle down to family life.

Astounding Sounds, Amazing Music is the first album of this era. On the eve of recording the follow-up "Back on the Streets" single, Turner was dismissed for his erratic live playing and Powell was deemed surplus to requirements. After a tour to promote the single and during the recording of the next album, Rudolph was also dismissed, for allegedly trying to steer the band into a musical direction at odds with Calvert and Brock's vision.

Adrian "Ade" Shaw, who, as bass player for Magic Muscle, had supported Hawkwind on the Space Ritual tour, came in for the 1977 album Quark, Strangeness and Charm. The band continued to enjoy moderate commercial success, but Calvert's mental illness often caused problems. A manic phase saw the band abandon a European tour in France, while a depression phase during a 1978 North American tour convinced Brock to disband the group.

On 23 December 1977 in Barnstaple, Brock and Calvert had performed a one-off gig with Devon band Ark as the Sonic Assassins, and looking for a new project in 1978, bassist Harvey Bainbridge and drummer Martin Griffin were recruited from this event. Steve Swindells was recruited as keyboard player. The band was named Hawklords, (probably for legal reasons, the band having recently split from their management).

King had originally been the drummer for the project but quit during recording sessions to return to London, while House, who had temporarily left the band to join a David Bowie tour, elected to remain with Bowie full-time, but nevertheless contributed violin to these sessions. At the end of the band's UK tour, Calvert, wanting King back in the band, dismissed Griffin, then promptly resigned himself, choosing to pursue a career in literature. Swindells left to record a solo album.

In late 1979, Hawkwind reformed with Brock, Bainbridge and King being joined by Huw Lloyd-Langton (who had played on the debut album) and Tim Blake (formerly of Gong), debuting at the first Futurama (The World's First Science Fiction Music Festival) on 9 September in Leeds, and then embarking upon a UK tour despite not having a record deal or any product to promote.

However, during the recording of Levitation King quit and Ginger Baker was drafted in for the sessions, but he chose to stay with the band for the tour, during which Blake left to be replaced by Keith Hale. In 1981 Baker and Hale left after their insistence that Bainbridge should be dismissed was ignored, and Brock and Bainbridge elected to handle synthesisers and sequencers themselves, with drummer Griffin from the Hawklords rejoining.

In the early 1980s, Brock had started using drum machines for his home demos and became increasingly frustrated at the inability of drummers to keep perfect time, leading to a succession of drummers coming and going. First, Griffin was ousted and the band tried King again, but, unhappy with his playing at that time, he was rejected. Andy Anderson briefly joined while he was also playing for The Cure, and Robert Heaton also filled the spot briefly prior to the rise of New Model Army. Lloyd Langton Group drummer John Clark did some recording sessions, and in late 1983 Rick Martinez joined the band to play drums on the Earth Ritual tour in February and March 1984, later replaced by Clive Deamer.

Turner had returned as a guest for the 1982 Choose Your Masques tour and was invited back permanently. Further tours ensued with Phil "Dead Fred" Reeves augmenting the line-up on keyboards and violin, but neither Turner nor Reeves would appear on the only recording of 1983–84, The Earth Ritual Preview; however there was a guest spot for Lemmy.

=== 1986–1999 ===
Alan Davey was a young fan of the band who had sent a tape of his playing to Brock, and Brock chose to oust Reeves moving Bainbridge from bass to keyboards to accommodate Davey. This experimental line-up played at the Stonehenge Free Festival in 1984, which was filmed and release as Stonehenge 84. Subsequent personal and professional tensions between Brock and Turner led to the latter's expulsion at the beginning of 1985. Clive Deamer, who was deemed "too professional" for the band, was eventually replaced in 1985 by Danny Thompson Jr (son of folk-rock bassist Danny Thompson), a friend of Alan Davey, and remained almost to the end of the decade.

A headline appearance at the 1986 Reading Festival was followed by a UK tour to promote the Live Chronicles album which was filmed and released as Chaos. In 1988 the band recorded the album The Xenon Codex with Guy Bidmead, but all was not well in the band and soon after, both Lloyd-Langton and Thompson departed.

Drummer Richard Chadwick, who joined in the summer of 1988, had been playing in small alternative free festival bands, most notably Bath's Smart Pils, for a decade and had frequently crossed paths with Hawkwind and Brock. He was initially invited simply to play with the band, but eventually replaced stand in drummer Mick Kirton to become the band's drummer to the present day.

To fill in the gap of lead sound, lost when Lloyd-Langton left, violinist House was re-instated into the line-up in 1989 (having previously been a member from 1974 until 1978), and, notably, Hawkwind embarked on their first North American visit in eleven years (since the somewhat disastrous 1978 tour), in which House did not partake. The successfully received tour was the first of several over the coming years, in an effort by the band to re-introduce themselves to the American market.

Bridget Wishart, an associate of Chadwick's from the festival circuit, also joined to become the band's one and only singing front-woman. 1991 commenced with perhaps the most surprising Hawkwind tour in the band's history, without Dave Brock. Brock's temporary replacement was former Smart Pils guitarist Steve Bemand (who had played with Chadwick and Wishart in the Demented Stoats). The tour began in Amsterdam on 12 March and took in Germany, Greece, Italy and France before wrapping up in Belgium on 10 April after 24 dates. In 1991 Bainbridge, House and Wishart departed and the band continued as a three piece relying heavily on synthesisers and sequencers to create a wall-of-sound.

Ron Tree had known the band on the festival circuit and offered his services as a front-man, and the band duly employed him for the album Alien 4 and its accompanying tour which resulted in the album Love in Space and video. In 1996, unhappy with the musical direction of the band, bassist Davey left, forming his own Middle-Eastern flavoured hard-rock group Bedouin and a Motörhead tribute act named Ace of Spades. His bass playing role was reluctantly picked up by singer Tree and the band were joined full-time by lead guitarist Jerry Richards (another stalwart of the festival scene, playing for Tubilah Dog who had merged with Brock's Agents of Chaos during 1988) for the albums Distant Horizons and In Your Area. Rasta chanter Captain Rizz also joined the band for guest spots during live shows.

=== 1999–2008 ===
Hawkestra—a re-union event featuring appearances from past and present members—had originally been intended to coincide with the band's 30th anniversary and the release of the career spanning Epocheclipse – 30 Year Anthology set, but logistical problems delayed it until 21 October 2000. The Hawkestra had set a template for Brock to assemble a core band of Tree, Brock, Richards, Davey, Chadwick and for the use of former members as guests on live shows and studio recordings. The 2000 Christmas Astoria show was recorded with contributions from House, Blake, Rizz, Moorcock, Jez Huggett and Keith Kniveton and released as Yule Ritual the following year. In 2001, Davey agreed to rejoin the band permanently, but only after the departure of Tree and Richards.

Meanwhile, having rekindled relationships with old friends at the Hawkestra, Turner organised further Hawkestra gigs resulting in the formation of xhawkwind.com, a band consisting mainly of ex-Hawkwind members and playing old Hawkwind songs. An appearance at Guilfest in 2002 led to confusion as to whether this actually was Hawkwind, sufficiently irking Brock into taking legal action to prohibit Turner from trading under the name Hawkwind. Turner lost the case and the band began performing as Space Ritual. An appearance at the Canterbury Sound Festival in August 2001, resulting in another live album Canterbury Fayre 2001, saw guest appearances from Lloyd-Langton, House, Kniveton with Arthur Brown on "Silver Machine". The band organised the first of their own weekend festivals, named Hawkfest, in Devon in the summer of 2002. Brown joined the band in 2002 for a Winter tour which featured some Kingdom Come songs and saw appearances from Blake and Lloyd-Langton, the Newcastle show being released on DVD as Out of the Shadows and the London show on CD as Spaced Out in London.

In 2005 a new album Take Me to Your Leader was released. Recorded by the core band of Brock/Davey/Chadwick, contributors included new keyboardist Jason Stuart, Arthur Brown, tabloid writer and TV personality Matthew Wright, 1970s New Wave singer Lene Lovich, Simon House and Jez Huggett. This was followed in 2006 by the CD/DVD Take Me to Your Future.

December 2006 saw the official departure of Alan Davey, who left to perform and record with two new bands: Gunslinger and Thunor. He was replaced by Mr Dibs, a long-standing member of the road crew. The band performed at their annual Hawkfest festival and headlined the US festival Nearfest and played gigs in PA and NY. At the end of 2007, Tim Blake once again joined the band filling the lead role playing keyboards and theremin.

On 8 September 2008 keyboard player Jason Stuart died due to a brain haemorrhage. In October 2008, Niall Hone (former Tribe of Cro) joined Hawkwind for their Winter 2008 tour playing guitar, along with returning synth/theremin player Tim Blake. In this period, Hone also occasionally played bass guitar alongside Mr Dibs and used laptops for live electronic improvisation.

=== 2009–present ===
In 2009, the band began occasionally featuring Jon Sevink from The Levellers as guest violinist at some shows. April 2012 saw the release of a new album, Onward, again on Eastworld. Keyboardist Dead Fred rejoined Hawkwind for the 2012 tour in support of Onward and remained with the band until 2016.

In February 2014, as part of a one-off Space Ritual performance, Hawkwind performed at the O2 Shepherd's Bush Empire featuring an appearance by Brian Blessed for the spoken word element of Sonic Attack; a studio recording of this performance was released as a single in September 2014. Later in the year, former Soft Machine guitarist John Etheridge joined the live line-up of the band, though he had departed again prior to early 2015 dates.

Following Hawkeaster 2015, Hawkwind made their debut visit to Japan, playing two sold-out shows in Tokyo. Hawkwind performed two Solstice Ritual shows in December 2015, with Steve Hillage guesting, and Haz Wheaton joining Hawkwind on bass guitar. Wheaton is a former member of the band's road crew who had previously appeared with Technicians of Spaceship Hawkwind, a "skeleton crew" spin off live band. Additionally, he had guested on bass for Dave Brock's solo album Brockworld released earlier in the year.

The band released The Machine Stops on 15 April 2016, a concept album based on E. M. Forster's short story of the same name. Brock and Chadwick were joined on the recording by Hone, Dibs and Wheaton sharing bass duties, while Hone and Dead Fred contributed one solo piece each. The album entered the UK album chart at number 29. Dead Fred's last live appearance was at Eastbourne Winter Gardens on 1 April; Hone took on keyboard and synth duties until Blake returned for the summer shows.

The trio of Brock, Chadwick and Wheaton recorded the album Into the Woods, released on 5 May 2017, with additional contributions from Dibs, Magnus Martin (whose band Tarantism had supported Hawkwind on many occasions) and Big Bill Barry. Martin and saxophonist Michał Sosna (from Polish group hipiersoniK) joined the band for a 16-date UK promotional tour in the same month.

A chance meeting with Mike Batt by Brock at the US Embassy brought him into the project contributing production, arrangement and additional orchestrations. The album Road to Utopia was released on 14 September 2018. There were guest appearances from Hawkwind's former sax player, Jez Huggett, and Eric Clapton, with whom Brock had performed as a duo in the 1960s prior to his rise to fame in The Yardbirds. Batt conducted a series of concerts titled In Search of Utopia - Infinity and Beyond featuring the band and Docklands Sinfonia Orchestra in October and November, with Arthur Brown guesting. After the recording of the album but before the shows, both Wheaton and Dibs left, while Hone rejoined on bass. Wheaton went on to join Electric Wizard, and Dibs stated "irreconcilable differences" on the Hawkwind fans' Facebook page; Brock claiming, "We propped the fella up and kept him in the band longer than he should have been, because we were genuinely concerned... about his state of mind."

In October 2019 the group released All Aboard the Skylark, marketed as a return to their space rock roots. This was the first album with the line-up of Brock, Chadwick, Hone and Martin. The album was promoted with a 15-date tour of Britain in November, culminating in a final show at London's Royal Albert Hall. The group were augmented by keyboard player Blake, with guest appearances from Phil Campbell and Clapton. A record of the live show titled 50th Anniversary Live, with the guest appearance from Campbell, was released on 4 December 2020 by Cherry Red Records in 3LP and 2CD formats.

Brock had started work on new material in his home studio with some contributions from Chadwick and Martin when the COVID-19 pandemic spread, curtailing any further band activity. Brock would continue work with remote contributions from Martin, and the album Carnivorous (an anagram of coronavirus) was released in October 2020 under the name Hawkwind Light Orchestra to reflect the reduced personnel.

When the group returned to live performances post-COVID in late 2021, the line-up featured Brock, Chadwick, Martin and new members Thighpaulsandra on keyboards and Doug MacKinnon on bass, replacing Blake and Hone respectively. A new Hawkwind album, Somnia, was released in September 2021.

== Members ==
=== Current members ===
Image	Name	Years active	Instruments	Release contributions
	Dave Brock	1969–present	vocals; guitars; keyboards; synthesisers	all releases
	Richard Chadwick	1988–present	drums; vocals; percussion; electronics	all releases from Space Bandits (1990) to present
	Magnus Martin	2016–present	vocals; guitars; keyboards; viola	all releases from Into the Woods (2017) to present
	Thighpaulsandra (Timothy Lewis)	2021–present	keyboards; synthesizers	all releases from We Are Looking in on You (2022) to present
	Doug MacKinnon	2021–present	bass	all releases from We Are Looking in on You (2022) to present

=== Former members ===
Image	Name	Years active	Instruments	Release contributions
	Nik Turner	1969–1976; 1982–1984 (session musician in 1982, additional musician in 1997 and 1999) (died 2022)	vocals; saxophone; flute	all releases from Hawkwind (1970) to Astounding Sounds, Amazing Music (1976); Choose Your Masques (1982) (one track only)
	Terry Ollis	1969–1972	drums	Hawkwind (1970); In Search of Space (1971)
	Dik Mik (Michael Davies)	1969–1971; 1971–1973 (died 2017)	audio generator	all releases from Hawkwind (1970) to Space Ritual (1973)
	Mick Slattery	1969 (died 2023)	guitars	Hawkwind (1970) (1996 bonus tracks only)
	John Harrison	1969–1970 (died 2012)	bass	Hawkwind (1970)
	Huw Lloyd-Langton	1969–1971; 1979–1988 (additional musician 2002–2005) (died 2012)	guitars; vocals	Hawkwind (1970); all releases from Live Seventy Nine (1980) to The Xenon Codex (1988); Canterbury Fayre 2001 (2003)
	Thomas Crimble	1970–1971	bass	none
	Dave Anderson	1971	bass; guitars	In Search of Space (1971)
	Del Dettmar	1971–1974	synthesisers; keyboards	all releases from In Search of Space (1971) to Hall of the Mountain Grill (1974)
	Robert Calvert	1971–1973; 1975–1979 (died 1988)	vocals	In Search of Space (1971) (1996 bonus tracks only); Doremi Fasol Latido (1972); Space Ritual (1973); Quark, Strangeness and Charm (1977); PXR5 (1979); 25 Years On (1978)
	Lemmy Kilmister	1971–1975 (died 2015)	bass; vocals; guitar	In Search of Space (1971) (1996 bonus tracks only); all releases from Doremi Fasol Latido (1972) to Warrior on the Edge of Time (1975); guest vocals on Take Me to Your Future (2006)
	Simon King	1971–1980	drums	all releases from Doremi Fasol Latido (1972) to Levitation (1980) (most live tracks); In Search of Space (1971) (1996 bonus tracks only)
	Simon House	1973–1978; 1989–1991 (additional musician 1999, 2000–2002 and 2005–2007); (died 2025)	keyboards; synthesisers; violin; vocals	all releases from Hall of the Mountain Grill (1974) to PXR5 (1979); Space Bandits (1990); Palace Springs (1991); Yule Ritual (2001); Canterbury Fayre 2001 (2003); Take Me to Your Leader (2005); Take Me to Your Future (2006)
	Alan Powell	1974–1976	drums	Warrior on the Edge of Time (1975); Astounding Sounds, Amazing Music (1976)
	Paul Rudolph	1975–1977 (session musician in 1972)	bass; guitar	Doremi Fasol Latido (1972) (session credit); Astounding Sounds, Amazing Music (1976)
	Adrian Shaw	1977–1978	bass; vocals	Quark, Strangeness and Charm (1977); PXR5 (1979)
	Harvey Bainbridge	1978–1991 (additional musician in 1999)	bass; keyboards; synthesisers; vocals	all releases from 25 Years On (1978) to Palace Springs (1991)
	Martin Griffin	1978–1979; 1981–1983 (died 2020)	drums	25 Years On (1978); Sonic Attack (1981); Church of Hawkwind (1982); Choose Your Masques (1982)
	Paul Hayles	1978–1979	keyboards; synthesisers	none
	Steve Swindells	1979	keyboards; synthesisers	25 Years On (1978); Levitation (1980) (some live tracks)
	Tim Blake	1979–1980; 2008–2015; 2019–2021 (additional musician 2000–2005, 2007–2008, 2016 and 2018–2019)	synthesisers; theremin; keyboards; vocals	Live Seventy Nine (1980); Levitation (1980); Yule Ritual (2001); Knights of Space (2008); Blood of the Earth (2010); Onward (2012); Space Ritual Live (2015); 50 Live (2020)
	Ginger Baker	1980–1981 (died 2019)	drums	Levitation (1980); This Is Hawkwind, Do Not Panic (1984)
	Keith Hale	1980–1981	keyboards; synthesisers; vocals	This Is Hawkwind, Do Not Panic (1984)
	Andy Anderson	1983 (died 2019)	drums	none
	Robert Heaton	1983 (died 2004)	drums	The Earth Ritual Preview (1994)
	Dead Fred	1983–1984; 2012–2015 (additional musician 2016)	keyboards; synthesisers; violin; vocals	Night of the Hawks (1984 video); Space Ritual Live (2015); The Machine Stops (2016)
	Rick Martinez	1983	drums	none
	Clive Deamer	1983–1985	drums	Night of the Hawks (1984 video); Undisclosed Files Addendum (1995)
	Alan Davey	1984–1996; 2000–2007	bass; vocals; synthesizers; keyboards	all releases from This Is Hawkwind, Do Not Panic (1984) to Love in Space (1996) and from Yule Ritual (2001) to Take Me to Your Future (2006)
	Danny Thompson Jr.	1985–1988	drums	This Is Hawkwind, Do Not Panic (1984) (two sides); The Chronicle of the Black Sword (1985); Live Chronicles (1985); The Xenon Codex (1988)
	Bridget Wishart	1990–1991	vocals	Space Bandits (1990); Palace Springs (1991)
	Ron Tree	1995–2001	vocals; bass	all releases from Alien 4 (1995) to Yule Ritual (2001)
	Jerry Richards	1996–2001 (additional musician in 1995)	guitars; vocals	all releases from Alien 4 (1995) to Yule Ritual (2001)
	Jason Stuart	2005–2008 (died 2008)	keyboards; synthesisers	Take Me to Your Leader (2005); Take Me to Your Future (2006); Knights of Space (2008)
	Mr Dibs	2007–2018	vocals; cello; guitar; bass; keyboards; synthesizers	all releases from Knights of Space (2008) to All Aboard the Skylark (2019), except Stellar Variations (2012)
	Niall Hone	2008–2016; 2018–2021	bass; guitar; keyboards; synthesizers; vocals	all releases from Blood of the Earth (2010) to The Machine Stops (2016) and from The Road to Utopia (2018) to 50 Live (2020)
	Haz Wheaton	2016–2018 (additional musician in 2015)	bass; keyboards	all releases from The Machine Stops (2016) to All Aboard the Skylark (2019)

=== Additional musicians ===
Image	Name	Years active	Instruments	Release contributions
	Michael Moorcock	1975; 1981; 2000–2001	vocals	Warrior on the Edge of Time (1975); Levitation (1980) (one live track); Sonic Attack (1981); Choose Your Masques (1982); Yule Ritual (2001)
	Mick Smith	1979	drums	Levitation (1980) (one live track)
	Steve Bemand	1991	guitars	none
	Samantha Fox	1993; 2000	vocals	"Gimme Shelter" (1993)
	Captain Rizz	1997–2000	vocals	Hawkwind 1997 (1999); In Your Area (1999); Yule Ritual (2001)
	Crum (Julian Crimmins)	1997	keyboards; bass	In Your Area (1999); Spacebrock (2000)
	Steve Taylor	1999	bass	none
	Keith Kniveton	1999; 2000–2002	synthesizers	Yule Ritual (2001); Canterbury Fayre 2001 (2003)
	Jez Huggett	2000–2001; 2005–2007	saxophone; flute	Yule Ritual (2001); Take Me to Your Leader (2005); Road to Utopia (2018)
	Keith Barton	2003–2005	guitar; keyboards	none
	Arthur Brown	2001–2007; 2018–2019; 2023	vocals	Canterbury Fayre 2001 (2003); Spaced Out in London (2004); Take Me to Your Leader (2005); Take Me to Your Future (2006)
	Lene Lovich	2005–2007	vocals	Take Me to Your Leader (2005)
	Jon Sevink	2008–2009	violin	Blood of the Earth (2010)
	John Etheridge	2013–2014; 2022	guitars	Space Ritual Live (2015)
	Steve Hillage	2015	guitars	none
	Phil Campbell	2016	guitars	none
	Eric Clapton	2018–2019	guitars	The Road to Utopia (2018)
	Mike Batt	2018–2019	orchestration; keyboards	The Road to Utopia (2018)
	Michal Sosna	2017–present	saxophone	At The Roundhouse (2017); Acoustic Daze (2019); All Aboard The Skylark (2019); Stories From Time And Space (2024)
	William Orbit	2023	keyboards; synthesizers	
	Dylan Clarke	2026	drums	none

=== Session/one off musicians ===
Image	Name	Years active	Instruments	Release contributions
	Dick Taylor	1970	lead guitar	Hawkwind (1970)
	Henry Lowther	1978	trumpet	25 Years On (1978)
	Les McClure	1978	voice	25 Years On (1978)
	Marc Sperhawk	1981–1982	bass guitar	Church of Hawkwind (1982)
	Capt Al Bodi	1981–1982	drums	Church of Hawkwind (1982)
	Dave Charles	1985	percussion; electronics	Choose Your Masques (1982); White Zone – Released as Psychedelic Warriors (1995)
	Beano Jameson	2000	electronics	Spacebrock (2000)
	Robert Swift	2000	electronics	Spacebrock (2000)
	Dez Walker	2000	electronics	Spacebrock (2000)
	James Clemas	2005	organ	Take Me to Your Leader (2005)
	Matthew Wright	2005	vocals	Take Me to Your Leader (2005)
	Phil Caivano	2005	guitar	Take Me to Your Leader (2005)

== Lineups ==
Period	Members	Releases
1969 Group X Hawkwind Zoo	Dave Brock – vocals, guitars, harmonica, percussion; John Harrison – bass; Dik Mik – audio generator; Terry Ollis – drums; Mick Slattery – guitars; Nik Turner – saxophone, flute, vocals, percussion	Hawkwind (1970) (1996 bonus tracks only)
1969–1970	Dave Brock – vocals, guitars, harmonica, percussion; John Harrison – bass; Dik Mik – audio generator; Terry Ollis – drums; Nik Turner – saxophone, flute, vocals; Huw Lloyd-Langton – guitars	Hawkwind (1970)
1970–1971	Dave Brock – vocals, guitars; Dik Mik – audio generator; Terry Ollis – drums; Nik Turner – saxophone, flute, vocals; Huw Lloyd-Langton – guitars; Thomas Crimble – bass	
1971	Dave Brock – vocals, guitars; Terry Ollis – drums; Nik Turner – saxophone, flute, vocals; Dave Anderson – bass, guitars; Del Dettmar – keyboards, synthesisers, percussion	
1971	Dave Brock – vocals, guitars, harmonica, audio generator; Terry Ollis – drums; Nik Turner – saxophone, flute, vocals; Dave Anderson – bass, guitar; Del Dettmar – keyboards, synthesisers, percussion; Dik Mik – audio generator	In Search of Space (1971)
1971–1973	Dave Brock – guitars, vocals; Nik Turner – saxophone, flute, vocals; Del Dettmar – keyboards, synthesisers, percussion; Dik Mik – audio generator; Robert Calvert – vocals; Lemmy Kilmister – bass, vocals, acoustic guitar; Simon King – drums	In Search of Space (1971) (1996 bonus tracks only); Doremi Fasol Latido (1972); Space Ritual (1973)
1973–1974	Dave Brock – guitars, organ, synthesizers, vocals; Nik Turner – saxophone, flute, vocals; Del Dettmar – keyboards, synthesisers, percussion; Lemmy Kilmister – bass, vocals, guitars; Simon King – drums, percussion; Simon House – keyboards, synthesisers, violin	Hall of the Mountain Grill (1974)
1974–1975	Dave Brock – guitars, keyboards, synthesisers, vocals; Nik Turner – saxophone, flute, vocals; Lemmy Kilmister – bass, vocals; Simon King – drums, percussion; Simon House – keyboards, synthesisers, violin; Alan Powell – drums, percussion; Additional personnel: Michael Moorcock – vocals	Warrior on the Edge of Time (1975)
1975	Dave Brock – guitars, keyboards, synthesisers, vocals; Nik Turner – saxophone, flute, vocals; Simon King – drums; Simon House – keyboards, synthesisers, violin; Alan Powell – drums; Paul Rudolph – bass, guitar	
1975–1976	Dave Brock – guitars, keyboards, synthesisers, backing vocals; Nik Turner – saxophone, flute, vocals; Simon King – drums; Simon House – keyboards, synthesisers, violin; Alan Powell – drums; Paul Rudolph – bass; Robert Calvert – vocals	Astounding Sounds, Amazing Music (1976)
1976–1977	Dave Brock – guitars, keyboards, synthesisers, vocals; Simon King – drums; Simon House – keyboards, synthesisers, violin; Paul Rudolph – bass; Robert Calvert – vocals	"Back on the Streets" (1976)
1977–1978	Dave Brock – guitars, keyboards, synthesisers, vocals; Simon King – drums; Simon House – keyboards, synthesisers, violin, vocals; Robert Calvert – vocals, percussion; Adrian Shaw – bass, vocals	Quark, Strangeness and Charm (1977); PXR5 (1979)
1977 Sonic Assassins	Dave Brock – guitars, keyboards, synthesisers, vocals; Robert Calvert – vocals; Harvey Bainbridge – bass; Martin Griffin – drums; Paul Hayles – keyboards, synthesisers	
1978	Dave Brock – guitars, keyboards, synthesisers, vocals; Paul Hayles – keyboards, synthesisers; Robert Calvert – vocals; Simon King – drums; Adrian Shaw – bass	
1978 Hawklords	Dave Brock – guitars, keyboards, synthesisers, vocals; Simon King – drums, percussion; Robert Calvert – vocals, acoustic guitar; Harvey Bainbridge – bass, vocals, synthesizers; Steve Swindells – keyboards, synthesisers	25 Years On – Released as Hawklords (1978)
1978 Hawklords	Dave Brock – guitars, keyboards, synthesisers, vocals; Robert Calvert – vocals, acoustic guitar; Harvey Bainbridge – bass; Steve Swindells – keyboards, synthesisers; Martin Griffin – drums	25 Years On – Released as Hawklords (1978)
1979 Hawklords	Dave Brock – vocals, guitars, keyboards, synthesisers; Harvey Bainbridge – bass, vocals, keyboards; Steve Swindells – keyboards, synthesisers; Simon King – drums	Levitation (1980) (some live tracks)
1979–1980	Dave Brock – vocals, guitars, keyboards, synthesisers; Harvey Bainbridge – bass, vocals; Simon King – drums; Tim Blake – keyboards, synthesisers, vocals; Huw Lloyd-Langton – guitars, vocals	Live Seventy Nine (1980)
1980	Dave Brock – vocals, guitars, keyboards, synthesisers; Harvey Bainbridge – bass, backing vocals, keyboards; Tim Blake – keyboards, synthesisers, backing vocals; Huw Lloyd-Langton – guitars, backing vocals; Ginger Baker – drums	Levitation (1980)
1980–1981	Dave Brock – guitars, keyboards, synthesisers, vocals; Harvey Bainbridge – bass, vocals, keyboards; Huw Lloyd-Langton – guitars, vocals; Ginger Baker – drums; Keith Hale – keyboards, synthesisers, vocals	Levitation (1980) (some live tracks); This Is Hawkwind, Do Not Panic (1984) (two sides)
1981–1982	Dave Brock – guitars, keyboards, synthesisers, vocals; Harvey Bainbridge – bass, vocals, keyboards, synthesisers; Huw Lloyd-Langton – guitars, vocals; Martin Griffin – drums; Additional personnel: Michael Moorcock - vocals	Sonic Attack (1981); Church of Hawkwind – Released as Church of Hawkwind (1982) (without Moorcock); Choose Your Masques (1982)
1982–1983	Dave Brock – vocals, guitars, keyboards, synthesisers; Harvey Bainbridge – bass, vocals, keyboards, synthesisers; Huw Lloyd-Langton – guitars, vocals; Martin Griffin – drums; Nik Turner – saxophone, flutes, vocals	Choose Your Masques (1982) (one track only)
1983	Dave Brock – vocals, guitars, keyboards, synthesisers; Harvey Bainbridge – bass, vocals, keyboards, synthesisers; Huw Lloyd-Langton – guitars, vocals; Nik Turner – saxophone, flutes, vocals; Andy Anderson – drums	
1983	Dave Brock – vocals, guitars, keyboards, synthesisers; Harvey Bainbridge – bass, vocals, keyboards, synthesisers; Huw Lloyd-Langton – guitars, vocals; Nik Turner – saxophone, flutes, vocals; Robert Heaton – drums	
1983	Dave Brock – vocals, guitars, keyboards, synthesisers; Harvey Bainbridge – bass, vocals, keyboards, synthesisers; Huw Lloyd-Langton – guitars, vocals; Nik Turner – saxophone, flutes, vocals; Dead Fred – keyboards, synthesisers; Rick Martinez - drums	
1983–1984	Dave Brock – vocals, guitars, keyboards, synthesisers; Harvey Bainbridge – bass, vocals, keyboards, synthesisers; Huw Lloyd-Langton – guitars, vocals; Nik Turner – saxophone, flutes, vocals; Dead Fred – keyboards; Clive Deamer – drums	
1984–1985	Dave Brock – vocals, guitars, keyboards, synthesisers; Harvey Bainbridge – keyboards, synthesisers, vocals; Huw Lloyd-Langton – guitars, vocals; Nik Turner – saxophone, flutes, vocals; Clive Deamer – drums; Alan Davey – bass, vocals	
1985	Dave Brock – vocals, guitars, keyboards, synthesisers; Harvey Bainbridge – keyboards, synthesisers, vocals; Huw Lloyd-Langton – guitars, vocals; Clive Deamer – drums; Alan Davey – bass, vocals	
1985–1988	Dave Brock – vocals, guitars, keyboards, synthesisers; Harvey Bainbridge – keyboards, synthesisers, vocals; Huw Lloyd-Langton – guitars, vocals; Alan Davey – bass, vocals; Danny Thompson Jr. – drums	This Is Hawkwind, Do Not Panic (1984) (two sides); The Chronicle of the Black Sword (1985); Live Chronicles (1985); The Xenon Codex (1988)
1988–1989	Dave Brock – vocals, guitars, keyboards, synthesisers; Harvey Bainbridge – keyboards, synthesisers, vocals; Alan Davey – bass, vocals; Richard Chadwick – drums, vocals	
1989–1990	Dave Brock – vocals, guitars, keyboards, synthesisers; Harvey Bainbridge – keyboards, synthesisers, vocals; Alan Davey – bass, vocals; Richard Chadwick – drums, vocals; Simon House – violin	
1990–1991	Dave Brock – vocals, guitars, keyboards, synthesisers; Harvey Bainbridge – keyboards, synthesisers, vocals; Alan Davey – bass, vocals; Richard Chadwick – drums, vocals; Simon House – violin; Bridget Wishart – vocals; Additional personnel: Steve Bemand – guitars (1991 European tour)	Space Bandits (1990); Palace Springs (1991)
1991–1995	Dave Brock – vocals, guitars, keyboards, synthesisers; Alan Davey – bass, vocals, keyboards, synthesizers; Richard Chadwick – drums, vocals	Electric Tepee (1992); It Is the Business of the Future to Be Dangerous (1993); The Business Trip (1994); White Zone – Released as Psychedelic Warriors (1995)
1995–1996	Dave Brock – vocals, guitars, keyboards, synthesisers; Alan Davey – bass, vocals; Richard Chadwick – drums, vocals; Ron Tree – vocals; Additional personnel: Jerry Richards – guitars (1995)	Alien 4 (1995); Love in Space (1996)
1996–2000	Dave Brock – vocals, guitars, keyboards, synthesisers; Richard Chadwick – drums, vocals; Ron Tree – bass, vocals; Jerry Richards – guitars; Additional personnel: Captain Rizz – vocals (1996–99); Crum – keyboards, bass (1997 UK tour); Steve Taylor – bass (1999 Aus/NZ tour); Simon House – violin (1999 Aus/NZ & UK tours); Harvey Bainbridge – keyboards, synthesizers, vocals (1999 Aus/NZ & UK tours); Nik Turner – saxophone, flute, vocals (1997, 1999); Keith Kniveton – synthesizers (1999)	Distant Horizons (1997); Hawkwind 1997 (1999) (with Captain Rizz); In Your Area (1999) (with Captain Rizz and Crum); Spacebrock (2000) (with Brock, Chadwick and Crum only)
2000–2001	Dave Brock – vocals, guitars, keyboards, synthesisers; Richard Chadwick – drums, vocals; Ron Tree – vocals; Jerry Richards – guitars, vocals; Alan Davey – bass, vocals; Additional personnel: Tim Blake – keyboards, synthesisers, vocals; Simon House – violin; Captain Rizz – vocals; Jez Huggett – saxophone, flute; Keith Kniveton – synthesisers; Michael Moorcock – vocals	Yule Ritual (2001)
2002–2005	Dave Brock – vocals, guitars, keyboards, synthesisers; Richard Chadwick – drums, vocals; Alan Davey – bass, vocals; Additional personnel: Huw Lloyd-Langton – guitars; Simon House – violin, keyboards, synthesisers (2001–2002); Tim Blake – keyboards, synthesisers, vocals (2002–2005); Keith Kniveton - synthesisers (2001–2002); Keith Barton - guitar, keyboards (2003–2005); Arthur Brown – vocals	Canterbury Fayre 2001 (2003); Spaced Out in London (2004); Take Me to Your Leader (2005) (some tracks)
2005–2007	Dave Brock – vocals, guitars, keyboards, synthesisers; Richard Chadwick – drums, vocals; Alan Davey – bass, vocals; Jason Stuart – keyboards, synthesisers; Additional personnel: Simon House – violin; Arthur Brown – vocals; Jez Huggett – saxophone, flute; Lene Lovich – vocals	Take Me to Your Leader (2005) (some tracks); Take Me to Your Future (2006)
2007–2008	Dave Brock – vocals, guitars, keyboards, synthesisers; Richard Chadwick – drums, vocals; Jason Stuart – keyboards, synthesisers; Mr Dibs – bass, vocals; Additional personnel: Tim Blake – keyboards, synthesisers (late 2007–2008)	Knights of Space (2008)
2008–2012	Dave Brock – vocals, guitars, keyboards, synthesisers; Richard Chadwick – drums, vocals; Mr Dibs – bass, vocals, cello; Tim Blake – keyboards, synthesisers; Niall Hone – bass, guitars, synthesizers; Additional personnel: Jon Sevink – violins (2008–2009)	Blood of the Earth (2010); Onward (2012); Stellar Variations – Released as Hawkwind Light Orchestra (2012) (Hone, Chadwick and Brock only)
2012–2015	Dave Brock – vocals, guitars, keyboards, synthesisers; Richard Chadwick – drums, vocals; Mr Dibs – bass, vocals, baritone, cello; Tim Blake – keyboards, synthesisers; Niall Hone – bass, guitars, synthesisers; Dead Fred – keyboards, violin, synthesisers, vocals; Additional personnel: John Etheridge – guitar (2013–2014); Steve Hillage – guitar (2015); Haz Wheaton – bass (2015)	Space Ritual Live (2015) (with Etheridge)
2016	Dave Brock – vocals, guitars, keyboards, synthesisers; Richard Chadwick – drums, vocals; Mr Dibs – vocals, bass, noises; Niall Hone – bass, guitars, synthesisers; Haz Wheaton – bass; Additional personnel: Dead Fred – keyboards, violin, synthesisers, vocals (Early 2016); Tim Blake – keyboards, synthesisers (Summer 2016); Phil Campbell – guitar (Hawkeaster 2016)	The Machine Stops (2016)
2017–2018	Dave Brock – vocals, guitars, keyboards, synthesisers; Richard Chadwick – drums, vocals; Mr Dibs – vocals, keyboards, synthesizers; Haz Wheaton – bass; Magnus Martin – keyboards, guitars	Into the Woods (2017); At The Roundhouse (2017); All Aboard the Skylark (2019) (one disc)
2018–2019	Dave Brock – vocals, guitars, keyboards, synthesisers; Richard Chadwick – drums, vocals; Magnus Martin – keyboards, guitars, vocals; Niall Hone – bass, synthesisers, vocals; Additional personnel: Eric Clapton – guitar; Mike Batt – orchestration, keyboards; Arthur Brown – vocals; Tim Blake – keyboards, synthesisers; Michal Sosna – saxophone	The Road to Utopia (2018); All Aboard the Skylark (2019) (one disc)
2019–2021	Dave Brock – vocals, guitars, keyboards, synthesisers; Richard Chadwick – drums, vocals; Magnus Martin – keyboards, guitars, vocals; Niall Hone – bass, synthesisers, vocals; Tim Blake – keyboards, synthesisers	Carnivorous – Released as Hawkwind Light Orchestra (2020) (Chadwick, Martin and Brock only); 50 Live (2020)
2021–present	Dave Brock – vocals, guitars, keyboards, synthesisers; Richard Chadwick – drums, vocals; Magnus Martin – keyboards, guitars, vocals; Doug MacKinnon – bass; Thighpaulsandra – keyboards, synthesisers	Somnia (2021) (Chadwick, Martin and Brock only); We Are Looking in on You (2022); The Future Never Waits (2023); Stories From Time And Space (2024)
