= Make Politicians History election results =

Minor UK political party

Make Politicians History was a minor United Kingdom political party that advocated the abolition of Parliament in favour of devolution to city-states and decision-making by referendum. From the 1980s, the group stood under various descriptions, including Vote For Yourself, www.xat.org and Vote For Yourself Rainbow Dream Ticket. It officially disbanded in 2009.

This list may not be complete.

== Enfield Southgate by-election, 14 July 1984 ==
Constituency	Candidate	Party name	Votes	%
Enfield, Southgate	George Weiss	Captain Rainbow's Universal Party	48	0.2

== Greenwich by-election, 26 February 1987 ==
Constituency	Candidate	Party name	Votes	%
Greenwich	Malcolm Hardee	Rainbow Dream Ticket, Beer, Fags & Skittles Party	124	0.3

== Kensington by-election, 14 July 1988 ==
Constituency	Candidate	Party name	Votes	%
Kensington	Cynthia Payne	Rainbow Alliance Payne and Pleasure Party	193	0.2

== General election, 1992 ==
Constituency	Candidate	Party name	Votes	%
Greenwich	Malcolm Hardee	Independent	103	0.3
Hampstead & Highgate	A Hall	Rainbow Ark Voters Association	44	0.1
Hampstead & Highgate	C S Wilson	Scallywagg	44	0.1
Hampstead & Highgate	Captain Rizz	Rainbow Dream Ticket	33	0.1

== General election, 1997 ==
Constituency	Candidate	Party name	Votes	%
Battersea	Joseph Marshall	Rainbow Dream Ticket	127	0.3
Brent, E	Claire Warrilow	Rainbow Dream Ticket	120	0.3
Brent, N	George Clark	Rainbow Dream Ticket	199	0.5
Brent, S	Christopher Howard	Rainbow Dream Ticket	175	0.5
Brighton, Kemptown	Alan Card	Rainbow Dream Ticket	59	0.1
Cities of London & Westminster	Jerry Sadowitz	Rainbow Dream Ticket	73	0.2
Coventry, NE	Leslie Francis	Rainbow Dream Ticket	176	0.3
Coventry, S	Anne-Marie Bradshaw	Rainbow Dream Ticket	180	0.4
Dulwich & West Norwood	David Goodman	Rainbow Dream Ticket	173	0.4
Esher & Walton	Simone Kay	Rainbow Dream Ticket	302	0.6
Hackney, N & Stoke Newington	Lisa Lovebucket	Rainbow Dream Ticket	176	0.5
Hampstead & Highgate	Ronnie Carroll	Rainbow Dream Ticket	141	0.3
Holborn & St. Pancras	Martin Rosenthal	Rainbow Dream Ticket	157	0.4
Isle of Wight	Jonathan Eveleigh	Rainbow Dream Ticket	86	0.1
Kensington & Chelsea	Paul Sullivan	Rainbow Dream Ticket	65	0.2
Kingston & Surbiton	Clifford Port	Rainbow Dream Ticket	100	0.2
Lewisham, E	Captain Rizz	Rainbow Dream Ticket	97	0.3
Manchester, Withington	Stephen Kingston	Rainbow Dream Ticket	181	0.4
Regent's Park & Kensington N	Debbie Sadowitz	Rainbow Dream Ticket	167	0.4
Richmond Park	Peter Davies	Rainbow Dream Ticket	73	0.1
St. Albans	Sari Craigen	Rainbow Dream Ticket	166	0.3
Teignbridge	Lorraine Golding	Rainbow Dream Ticket	139	0.2
Tooting	Daniel Bailey-Bond	Rainbow Dream Ticket	83	0.2
Torbay	Paul Wild	Rainbow Dream Ticket	100	0.2
Totnes	James Golding	Rainbow Dream Ticket	108	0.2
Twickenham	Terence Haggar	Rainbow Dream Ticket	155	0.3
West Ham	Jonathan Rainbow	Rainbow Dream Ticket	116	0.3
Wimbledon	Graham Stacey	Rainbow Dream Ticket	47	0.1
Yeovil	Chris Hudson	Rainbow Dream Ticket	97	0.2

== Uxbridge by-election, 31 July 1997 ==
Constituency	Candidate	Party name	Votes	%
Uxbridge	Ronnie Carroll	Rainbow Dream Ticket	30	0.1

== General election, 2001 ==
Constituency	Candidate	Party name	Votes	%
Belfast, E	Rainbow George Weiss	Vote For Yourself Dream Ticket	71	0.2
Belfast, N	Rainbow George Weiss	Vote For Yourself Dream Ticket	134	0.3
Belfast, S	Rainbow George Weiss	Vote For Yourself Dream Ticket	115	0.3
Belfast, W	Rainbow George Weiss	Vote For Yourself Dream Ticket	98	0.2

== General election, 2005 ==
Constituency	Candidate	Party name	Votes	%
Antrim, E	David Kerr	Vote For Yourself Dream Ticket	147	0.5
Belfast, E	Lynda Gilby	Vote For Yourself Dream Ticket	172	0.6
Belfast, N	Lynda Gilby	Vote For Yourself Dream Ticket	151	0.5
Belfast, S	Lynda Gilby	Vote For Yourself Dream Ticket	235	0.7
Belfast, W	Lynda Gilby	Vote For Yourself Dream Ticket	154	0.4
Brent, E	Rainbow George Weiss	Vote For Yourself Dream Ticket	39	0.1
Brent, N	Rainbow George Weiss	Vote For Yourself Dream Ticket	126	0.4
Brent, S	Rainbow George Weiss	Vote For Yourself Dream Ticket	61	0.2
Cardiff, Central	Catherine Taylor-Dawson	Vote For Yourself Dream Ticket	37	0.1
Cardiff, N	Catherine Taylor-Dawson	Vote For Yourself Dream Ticket	1	0.0
Cardiff, S & Penarth	Catherine Taylor-Dawson	Vote For Yourself Dream Ticket	79	0.2
Cardiff, W	Catherine Taylor-Dawson	Vote For Yourself Dream Ticket	167	0.5
Chipping Barnet	Rainbow George Weiss	Vote For Yourself Dream Ticket	59	0.1
Finchley & Golders Green	Rainbow George Weiss	Vote For Yourself Dream Ticket	110	0.3
Foyle	Ben Reel	Vote For Yourself Dream Ticket	31	0.1
Hampstead & Highgate	Rainbow George Weiss	Vote For Yourself Dream Ticket	91	0.2
Hendon	Rainbow George Weiss	Vote For Yourself Dream Ticket	68	0.2
Holborn & St Pancras	Rainbow George Weiss	Vote For Yourself Dream Ticket	152	0.4
Kingston & Surbiton	Rainbow George Weiss	Vote For Yourself Dream Ticket	146	0.3
Richmond Park	Rainbow George Weiss	Vote For Yourself Dream Ticket	63	0.1
Sutton & Cheam	Rainbow George Weiss	Vote For Yourself Dream Ticket	288	0.7
Twickenham	Rainbow George Weiss	Vote For Yourself Dream Ticket	64	0.1
Wimbledon	Rainbow George Weiss	Vote For Yourself Dream Ticket	22	0.1

There were three candidates in the 2003 Northern Ireland Assembly election.

Under the title Make Politicians History, Weiss stood in the four Belfast constituencies in the Northern Ireland Assembly elections in 2007.

== Haltemprice & Howden by-election, 10 July 2008 ==
Constituency	Candidate	Party name	Votes	%
Haltemprice and Howden	Ronnie Carroll	Make Politicians History	29	0.1
