= Hawkwind 1997 =

Live album by Hawkwind
- Released: 11 January 1999
- Recorded: October and November 1997
- Genre: Space rock
- Label: Voiceprint
- Producer: Hawkwind

Hawkwind chronology
Distant Horizons (1997)	Hawkwind 1997 (1999)	In Your Area (1999)

Hawkwind 1997 is a 1999 live album by the English space rock group Hawkwind.

It was recorded at various shows during the group's 1997 tour to promote the Distant Horizons album.

== Track listing ==
1. "Wheels (Your World)" (Richard Chadwick, Jerry Richards) – The Garage, Glasgow, 19 October
2. "Phetamine Street" (Ron Tree) – The Irish Centre, Leeds, 27 October
3. "Fantasy" (Captain Rizz, Tree, Dave Brock, Chadwick, Richards) – University of East Anglia, Norwich, 8 October
4. "Alchemy" (Chadwick, Richards) – The Centre, Newport, 6 November
5. "Love in Space" (Brock) – The Centre, Newport, 6 November
6. "Aerospaceage Inferno" (Robert Calvert) – The Empire, Liverpool, 23 October
7. "Sonic Attack" (Michael Moorcock) – The Empire, Liverpool, 23 October
8. "Blue Skin" (Tree, Brock) – Charter Hall, Colchester, 10 October
9. "Brainstorm" (Nik Turner) / "Hawkwind in Your Area" (Rizz/Brock) – The Empire, Liverpool, 23 October
10. "Reptoid Vision" (Tree) – The Empire, Liverpool, 23 October
11. "Ejection" (Calvert) – Festival Theatre, Paignton, 5 November
12. "The Gremlin (part 2)" (Calvert) – Festival Theatre, Paignton, 5 November

== Members ==
See List of Hawkwind band members#1986–1999

== Release history ==
- January 1999: Voiceprint Records, HAWKVP999, CD - limited edition sold at gigs and through the Hawkwind website.
