= TWSI =

TWSI may refer to:

- Two-wire serial interface, a type of I²C
- Tottenham War Services Institute, a charity in London
- Tactile Walking Surface Indicators
