= Cynthia Payne =

English madam and media personality (1932–2015)

- Born: Cynthia Diana Paine; 24 December 1932; Bognor Regis, Sussex, England
- Died: 15 November 2015 (aged 82); Camberwell, London, England
- Burial place: Streatham Park Cemetery
- Other name: Madam Cyn
- Occupations: Madam; brothel keeper; party hostess; politician; media personality
- Years active: 1978–2014
- Notable work: Entertaining at Home: 101 Party Hints from Britain's Most Popular Hostess
- Political party: Rainbow Alliance Payne and Pleasure Party (1988)
- Children: 2

Cynthia Diana Paine (24 December 1932 – 15 November 2015), known professionally as Cynthia Payne and nicknamed Madam Cyn, was an English madam, brothel keeper, party hostess, and media personality. She was widely considered to be Britain's best known madam. She made headlines throughout the 1970s and 1980s, when she was convicted of running a brothel at 32 Ambleside Avenue in Streatham, south London.

== Early life ==
Cynthia Diana Paine was born in Bognor Regis, Sussex, England on 24 December (Christmas Eve) 1932, as the elder child to Nelson Arthur Paine, a hairdresser, who worked on Union Castle liners, and his wife, Elizabeth (née Light), a housewife, who died from throat cancer when her daughter was 12 years old. Her birth was registered in Westhampnett in January 1933. She had a younger sister, Wendy A Stokes (née Paine).

Payne was expelled from her convent boarding school for being a "bad influence". She trained as a hairdresser, before working as a waitress, and later, as a shop assistant. As a teenager, she moved to London to work in a department store, Swan & Edgar.

== Career ==
Payne, known as "Madam Cyn", first came to national attention in December 1978, when police raided her home, 32 Ambleside Avenue, in Streatham, a suburb in South London, while a sex party was in progress. Men, using difficult-to-forge luncheon vouchers to provide "proof of services performed", paid to dress up in lingerie and be spanked by young women. Police found 53 men at her residence, in varying levels of undress, including "a peer of the realm, an MP, a number of solicitors and company directors and several vicars". A cartoon in the press at the time, according to Sarah Baxter in The Sunday Times, "showed a vicar in bed with a prostitute, confronted by a policeman. 'I demand to see my solicitor,' said the vicar, 'who is in the next bedroom.'" She slipped into prostitution to avoid eviction from her flat.

When the case came to trial in 1980, Payne was sentenced to 18 months in prison, reduced to a fine and six months on appeal. She served four months in HM Prison Holloway, a closed category prison for adult women and young offenders in Holloway, London. She was released from prison on 17 August 1980, where she was picked up by a former client in his Rolls-Royce. She gave the awaiting photographers a V-sign and the quote: "V for victory, V for voucher."

In 1986, the police raided Payne's home again, this time, during a "special party" she was hosting after shooting of the film of her life had been completed. Although she was acquitted on this occasion, the resulting court case in 1987 made headlines for several weeks with lurid tales, some details of which she aired on the ITV comedy talk-show The Dame Edna Experience, broadcast on 17 October, co-guesting with John Mills and Rudolf Nureyev, on which she launched her book, Entertaining at Home: 101 Party Hints from Britain's Most Popular Hostess (ISBN 978-0-14-010618-3), which was published by Penguin. The court case ended her career as a party giver.

Payne became a media personality, appearing on a number of television programmes. These included Joan Rivers: Can We Talk? (BBC Two, 1986); the documentary Personal Services-The Making of a Celebrity (BBC Two, 1987), in which she spoke to Joan Bakewell; the comedy game show Blankety Blank, hosted by Les Dawson, in which she appeared as a panellist (BBC One, 1987); the talk show Wogan (BBC One, 1991); Showbiz People (BBC One; 1992); the spoof talk show The Mrs Merton Show (BBC Two, 1995); the talk show Esther (BBC Two, 1996 and 1998) and the magazine show Menzone (BBC Two, 1998), in which she spoke to Tim Grundy.

Payne was also the subject of the BBC Two series Celebrity Mantelpiece (1993). In addition, she appeared in three episodes of the BBC Radio 2 programme The Law Game, in the episodes broadcast on 24 September 1991, 1 October 1991 and 4 March 1992.

While appearing on The Dame Edna Experience in 1987, Payne expressed an interest in becoming a Member of Parliament in order to change Britain's sex laws, which she followed through by standing for Parliament as a candidate for the Rainbow Alliance Payne and Pleasure Party in the Kensington by-election in July 1988, finishing sixth of fifteen candidates with 193 votes (0.82%). Payne then stood unsuccessfully in her own area, Streatham, for the Rainbow Dream Ticket in the 1992 general election. She again came sixth, of seven candidates, with 145 votes (0.4%).

Payne also made appearances as an after-dinner speaker, and launched a range of "adult" services and products in 2006.

== Personal life ==
Payne had two sons. She fell pregnant by a much older married man and gave birth to her elder child, who was eventually fostered. Payne financed his boarding school education and later attended his wedding. She gave her younger child up for adoption at a few weeks old, and had three abortions. Although she was always known as Mrs. Payne, she never married. She had five grandchildren.

Payne lived at 32 Ambleside Avenue, a detached Edwardian four-bed house, in Streatham, south London, which she bought for £16,000 in 1974, and owned until her death. Her secretary and advisor, Gloria Walker, later moved in with her. At one time, the musician and perennial parliamentary candidate, Screaming Lord Sutch, lived with her. Land Registry records show her house was sold for £1.25m in October 2016.

Payne had once been a muse of the London-based Scottish fashion designer Christopher Kane at London Fashion Week.

=== Death ===
Payne died at King's College Hospital in Camberwell on 15 November 2015. She was 82. Her family celebrated her life with a colourful humanist funeral service on 9 December 2015, in accordance with her wishes. She was buried at Streatham Park Cemetery in Greater London.

In November 2016, it was reported that Payne had left nearly £1.3m in her will, which was divided equally between her sons. The bulk of her estate was made up by the value of her house in Streatham.

== Filmography ==
Year	Title	Notes	Reference
1982	Book Four	Series 1 Episode 2	
1986	Joan Rivers: Can We Talk?	Broadcast 31 March 1986	
1987, 1991	Wogan	2 episodes; broadcast 23 February 1987 and 5 August 1991	
1987	The Last Resort	Series 1 Episode 8	
1987	Personal Services	Consultant	
1987	Personal Services-The Making of a Celebrity	Broadcast 1 May 1987	
1987	Late Night with David Letterman	Series 6 Episode 56	
1987, 1994	The Rock 'n' Roll Years	2 episodes	
1987	Frox on the Box	Broadcast 30 September 1987	
1987	The Dame Edna Experience	Series 1 Episode 6	
1987	Blankety Blank	Series 11 Episode 10; broadcast 20 November 1987	
1988	Bains de minuit	3 episodes	
1988	One More Audience with Dame Edna Everage	Audience member; uncredited	
1989	The James Whale Radio Show	2 episodes	
1990	Gilbert's Fringe	Broadcast 8 February 1990	
1990	The Garden Party	Series 3 Episode 7; broadcast 31 July 1990	
1990	An Audience with Jackie Mason	Audience member	
1991, 1996, 1997	This Morning	3 episodes	
1992	The Time, The Place	Broadcast 29 April 1992	
1992	Showbiz People	Series 1 Episode 9; broadcast 9 July 1992	
1992	TV Squash	Series 1 Episode 3	
1993	The Brain Drain	Series 2 Episode 6	
1993	Celebrity Mantelpiece	Episode: "Cynthia Payne"; broadcast 6 October 1993	
1995	The Mrs Merton Show	Series 1 Episode 3; broadcast 24 February 1995	
1995	The Ghost Files		
1995	Cynthia Payne's House of Cyn		
1996	Mistresses	Episode: "Men Behaving Badly"	
1996	Esther	Broadcast 19 April 1996	
1997	In Bed with Medinner	Series 3 Episode 4	
1997	Selection Box	Episode: "Porridge"	
1997	The Lily Savage Show	Series 1 Episode 3	
1997	The Jack Docherty Show	Broadcast 4 December 1997	
1998	Esther	Episode: "When The Truth Comes Out"; broadcast 10 February 1998	
1998	Menzone	Broadcast 21 March 1998	
1999	Omnibus	Episode: "Our Julie"	
2000	The 11 O'Clock Show	Series 4 Episode 10	
2001	Through the Keyhole	Broadcast 16 May 2001	
2001	Ceri Dupree Unfrocked	Broadcast 9 November 2001	
2001	80s Mania		
2005	Greatest Before They Were Stars TV Moments		
2006	Madam Cyn's Home Movies		
2007	The Most Shocking Celebrity Moments of 2006		
2007	Cynthia Payne: At the 'House of Cyn'	Uncredited	
2007	Most Shocking Celebrity Moments of the 21st Century		
2014	Inside Holloway	Episode: "Women in Chains: 1948-2014"	

== Legacy ==
There are two verified biographies about Payne's life: An English Madam: The Life and Work of Cynthia Payne (ISBN 978-0-224-02037-4), written by Paul Bailey and published by Jonathan Cape in 1982, and Sexplicitly Yours: Trial of Cynthia Payne (ISBN 978-0-14-010543-8), written by Gloria Walker, her secretary and advisor, which was published by Penguin Books Ltd in 1987.

There were two comedy films which were loosely based on Payne's life, both released in 1987: Personal Services (in May that year), about her adult life, starring Julie Walters in the lead role of Christine Painter, and directed by Terry Jones; and Wish You Were Here (in July), about her adolescence growing up on the Sussex coast, with Emily Lloyd in the lead role of Lynda Mansell. Both were written by David Leland, who also directed Wish You Were Here, which was filmed in Brighton, Worthing and Bognor Regis over a period of six weeks; the first day of filming was on Lloyd's 16th birthday. Personal Services was banned in the Republic of Ireland on 13 March, upon theatrical release, although the ban was lifted two months later, after being overturned by the Film Appeals Board on 12 May.
