= Take Me to Your Future =

Studio album by Hawkwind
- Released: 4 September 2006
- Recorded: 2005
- Genre: Space rock
- Label: Voiceprint
- Producer: Hawkwind

Hawkwind chronology
Take Me to Your Leader (2005)	Take Me to Your Future (2006)	Knights of Space (2008)

Professional ratings
Review scores
Source	Rating
AllMusic	3.5/5 stars
Record Collector	3/5 stars

Take Me to Your Future is the twenty fifth studio/live album produced under the Hawkwind name, a 2006 dual disc of new studio audio and archive live videos by Hawkwind.

The cover is based on Georgia O'Keeffe's 1927 painting Radiator Building - Night, New York of the American Radiator Building.

== Audio side ==
1. "Uncle Sam’s on Mars" (Calvert, Brock, House, King) - 8:18 - new version
2. "Small Boy" (Calvert, Brock) - 3:16 - from The Brock/Calvert Project album.
3. "The Reality of Poverty" (Morley, Brock) - 9:08
4. "Ode to a Timeflower" (Calvert, Brock) - 4:05 - from The Brock/Calvert Project album.
5. "Silver Machine" (Calvert, Brock) - 6:58 - remix

== Video side ==
1. "Images" - from the forthcoming DVD Space Bandits
2. "Utopia" - from the forthcoming DVD Australia 2000 Video on YouTube
3. "Assassins of Allah" - from the forthcoming DVD Winter Solstice 2005
4. "The Golden Void" - from the forthcoming DVD Treworgey Tree Fayre 1989
5. "Steppenwolf" - 1996 rehearsal footage
6. "Don’t be Donkish" - Hawkfest 2002 and 2003 footage
7. "Paradox" - Take Me to Your Leader launch party footage myspace

== Personnel ==
Hawkwind

- Robert Calvert - vocals
- Dave Brock - guitar, keyboards, vocals
- Alan Davey - bass guitar, vocals
- Richard Chadwick - drums
- Simon House - violin track 3
- Arthur Brown - vocals track 3
- Lemmy - vocals track 5
