= In Your Area (album) =

Studio album by Hawkwind
- Released: 5 January 1999
- Recorded: November 1997, Earth Studios 1998
- Genre: Space rock, psychedelic rock
- Length: 51:59
- Label: Griffin Music; Voiceprint
- Producer: Hawkwind

Hawkwind chronology
Hawkwind 1997 (1999)	In Your Area (1999)	Spacebrock (2000)

Professional ratings
Review scores
Source	Rating
Allmusic	4/5 stars

Hawkwind in Your Area is the twenty-second live/studio album by the English space rock group Hawkwind.

The live side was recorded during the group's 1997 tour to promote the Distant Horizons album. The studio tracks were recorded during 1998.

The group had ceased business dealings with former manager Douglas Smith who had been running the record label Emergency Broadcast System Records, and as a consequence found themselves without an outlet in Europe for their recordings. They had, however, a long-standing deal with Griffin Music in North America for licensing the EBS material, so this album received a North American release in January 1999, but no European equivalent. Later, in 2000, as Brock started to make archive material available for release in the UK through Voiceprint Records, it received a belated UK release.

== Track listing ==
1. "Brainstorm" (Nik Turner) / "Hawkwind in Your Area" (Dave Brock, Captain Rizz) / "Alchemy" (Richards, Chadwick) – 11:08
2. "Love in Space" (Brock) – 2:46
3. "Rat Race" (Brock, Rizz) – 5:51
4. "Aerospace Age Inferno" (Robert Calvert) – 5:32
5. "First Landing on Medusa" (Calvert, Brock) – 1:41
6. "I Am the Reptoid" (Tree) – 3:19
7. "The Nazca" (Brock) – 0:44
8. "Hippy" (Tree, Richards) – 5:45
9. "Prairie" (Tree, Richards) – 2:39
10. "Your Fantasy" (Tree, Brock, Chadwick, Richards) – 5:04
11. "Luxotica" (Tree, Chadwick, Richards) – 3:09
12. "Diana Park" (Brock) – 4:21

== Personnel ==
Hawkwind

- Dave Brock – electric guitar, keyboards, vocals
- Jerry Richards – electric guitar
- Ron Tree – vocals, bass guitar
- Richard Chadwick – drums

with:

- Captain Rizz – vocals
- Crum (Julian Crimmins) – keyboards

== Credits ==
- Tracks 1–6 recorded live at Ancienne Belgique, Brussels, Belgium – 20 November 1997

== Release history ==
- 1999: Griffin Music, GCD740-2, USA
- 2000: Voiceprint, HAWKVP17CD, UK
