= Hampstead and Highgate =

UK Parliament constituency (1983–2010, 2024 onwards)

Coordinates: 51.556°N 0.173°W

- Borough constituency for the House of Commons
- Interactive map of boundaries from 2024
- Location within Greater London
- County: Greater London
- Electorate: 74,222 (March 2020)

Current constituency
- Created: 2024
- Member of Parliament: Tulip Siddiq (Labour)
- Seats: One
- Created from: Hampstead and Kilburn, Holborn and St Pancras, Hornsey and Wood Green

1983–2010
- Type of constituency: Borough constituency
- Created from: Hampstead and St Pancras North
- Replaced by: Hampstead and Kilburn, Holborn and St Pancras

Hampstead and Highgate is a parliamentary constituency covering the northern half of the London Borough of Camden, and a small part of the London Borough of Haringey. It includes the villages of Hampstead and Highgate. It has been represented by Tulip Siddiq of the Labour Party since 2024, having been the MP for the predecessor seat of Hampstead and Kilburn since 2015.

It was first created for the 1983 general election and abolished for the 2010 general election, with the majority forming the new constituency of Hampstead and Kilburn, and part going into the Holborn and St Pancras seat.

Further to the completion of the 2023 review of Westminster constituencies, the seat was re-established for the 2024 general election.

== Constituency profile ==
Hampstead and Highgate is a mostly suburban constituency in Greater London, located around 4 miles (6.4 km) north-west of the centre of London. It covers the neighbourhoods of Hampstead, Highgate, Belsize Park, Swiss Cottage and parts of Kilburn. Like much of suburban London, the area grew rapidly in population with the arrival of rail transport in the late 19th century. Hampstead is known for being home to many wealthy celebrities and politicians, whilst Kilburn has high levels of deprivation. The average house price in the constituency is over £1.2 million, double the London average and more than four times the national average.

In general, residents of the constituency are young and highly-educated. They are unlikely to be homeowners but have very high rates of income and professional employment. White people made up 66% of the population at the 2021 census, a higher proportion than the rest of London. White people of non-British origin were 27%, Asians were 14% and Black people were 7%. At the local borough council level, the west of the constituency around Kilburn and Swiss Cottage is represented by the Labour Party, whilst the wealthier areas of Hampstead and Highgate elected Conservatives and Liberal Democrats. Voters in the constituency overwhelmingly supported remaining in the European Union in the 2016 referendum; an estimated 76% voted to remain, making Hampstead and Highgate one of the top 15 most remain-supporing constituencies out of 650 nationwide.

== History ==
Some areas here were amongst the wealthiest in the UK, but the seat always had an intellectual, artistic middle-class vote associated with the intelligentsia (see main page on Hampstead). It also contained Kilburn, with its large Irish community. The Labour incumbent in Hampstead and Highgate at the time of abolition, Glenda Jackson, retained the new constituency of Hampstead and Kilburn in 2010 with a majority of just 42.

== Boundaries ==
=== Historic ===
1983–2010 boundaries

1983–1997: The London Borough of Camden wards of Adelaide, Belsize, Fitzjohns, Fortune Green, Frognal, Hampstead Town, Highgate, Kilburn, Priory, South End, Swiss Cottage, and West End.

1997–2010: The London Borough of Camden wards of Adelaide, Belsize, Fitzjohns, Fortune Green, Frognal, Gospel Oak, Hampstead Town, Highgate, Kilburn, Priory, South End, Swiss Cottage, and West End.

In 2002, a Local Government Boundary Commission for England review abolished the Adelaide, Priory, South End and West End wards, whilst it combined Frognal and Fitzjohns into one ward. For the 2005 general election, the electoral wards used in this constituency were Belsize, Camden Town with Primrose Hill (part), Fortune Green, Frognal and Fitzjohns, Gospel Oak (part), Hampstead Town, Haverstock (part), Highgate (part), Kilburn, Swiss Cottage and West Hampstead.

Following their review of parliamentary representation in North London, the Boundary Commission for England created a new constituency of Hampstead and Kilburn by excluding Highgate ward (which became part of Holborn & St Pancras) and including three wards from the neighbouring borough of Brent. Hampstead and Kilburn largely replaced Hampstead and Highgate for the 2010 general election.

=== Current ===
Further to the 2023 review of Westminster constituencies, which came into effect for the 2024 general election, the re-established constituency is composed of:

- The London Borough of Camden wards of Belsize, Fortune Green, Frognal, Gospel Oak, Hampstead Town, Highgate, Kilburn, Primrose Hill (western part), South Hampstead, and West Hampstead; and
- The London Borough of Haringey ward of Highgate.

It comprises those parts of the Borough of Camden previously in the abolished Hampstead and Kilburn constituency, plus the Gospel Oak and Highgate wards, transferred from Holborn and St Pancras, and the Highgate ward in the Borough of Haringey, transferred from Hornsey and Wood Green.

== Members of Parliament ==
Election	Member	Party
1983	Geoffrey Finsberg	Conservative
1992	Glenda Jackson	Labour
2010	Constituency abolished: see Hampstead and Kilburn	
2024	Tulip Siddiq	Labour

== Elections ==
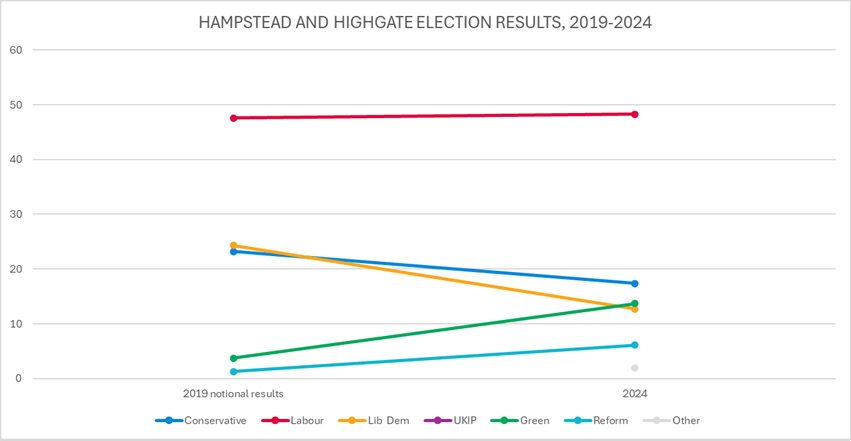
Election results 2019-2024

=== Elections in the 2020s ===
General election 2024: Hampstead and Highgate
Party	Candidate	Votes	%	±%
Labour	Tulip Siddiq	23,432	48.3	+0.7
Conservative	Don Williams	8,462	17.4	–5.8
Green	Lorna Russell	6,630	13.7	+10.0
Liberal Democrats	Scott Emery	6,181	12.7	–11.6
Reform	Catherine Becker	2,940	6.1	+4.8
Rejoin EU	Christie Elan-Cane	532	1.1	N/A
Independent	Jonathan Livingstone	373	0.8	N/A
Majority		14,970	30.8	+5.4
Turnout		48,550	60.7	–16.6
Registered electors		80,029		
Labour hold		Swing	▲3.3	

=== Elections in the 2010s ===
2019 notional result
Party	Vote	%
Labour	27,338	47.6
Liberal Democrats	13,938	24.3
Conservative	13,296	23.2
Green	2,096	3.7
Brexit Party	719	1.3
Turnout	57,387	77.3
Electorate	74,222	

=== Elections in the 2000s ===
General election 2005: Hampstead and Highgate
Party	Candidate	Votes	%	±%
Labour	Glenda Jackson	14,615	38.3	−8.6
Conservative	Piers Wauchope	10,886	28.5	+3.9
Liberal Democrats	Ed Fordham	10,293	27.0	+6.5
Green	Siân Berry	2,013	5.3	+0.6
UKIP	Magnus Nielsen	275	0.7	−0.2
Rainbow Dream Ticket	Rainbow George Weiss	91	0.2	N/A
Majority		3,729	9.8	−12.5
Turnout		38,173	55.5	+1.2
Labour hold		Swing	−6.3	

General election 2001: Hampstead and Highgate
Party	Candidate	Votes	%	±%
Labour	Glenda Jackson	16,601	46.9	−10.5
Conservative	Karl Mennear	8,725	24.6	−2.6
Liberal Democrats	Jonathan Simpson	7,273	20.5	+8.1
Green	Andrew Cornwell	1,654	4.7	N/A
Socialist Alliance	Helen Cooper	559	1.6	N/A
UKIP	Thomas McDermott	316	0.9	+0.6
Independent	Sister Xnunoftheabove	144	0.4	New
ProLife Alliance	Mary Teale	92	0.3	New
Independent	Amos Klein	43	0.1	New
Majority		7,876	22.3	−7.9
Turnout		35,407	54.3	−13.6
Labour hold		Swing		

=== Elections in the 1990s ===
General election 1997: Hampstead and Highgate
Party	Candidate	Votes	%	±%
Labour	Glenda Jackson	25,275	57.4	+11.2
Conservative	Elizabeth Gibson	11,991	27.2	−13.5
Liberal Democrats	Bridget Fox	5,481	12.4	+1.4
Referendum	Monima Siddique	667	1.5	N/A
Natural Law	Jonathan Leslie	147	0.3	+0.1
Rainbow Dream Ticket	Ronnie Carroll	141	0.3	N/A
UKIP	P. Prince	123	0.3	N/A
Humanist	Robert Harris	105	0.2	N/A
Rizz Party	Captain Rizz	101	0.2	+0.1
Majority		13,284	30.2	+24.7
Turnout		44,031	67.9	+2.7
Registered electors		64,889		
Labour hold		Swing	+12.4	

1992 notional result
Party	Vote	%
Labour	21,059	46.2
Conservative	18,582	40.8
Liberal Democrats	5,028	11.0
Others	900	2.0
Turnout	45,569	65.1
Electorate	69,959	

General election 1992: Hampstead and Highgate
Party	Candidate	Votes	%	±%
Labour	Glenda Jackson	19,193	45.1	+7.5
Conservative	Oliver Letwin	17,753	41.8	−0.7
Liberal Democrats	David Wrede	4,765	11.2	−8.1
Green	Stephen Games	594	1.4	N/A
Natural Law	Richard Prosser	86	0.2	N/A
Rainbow Ark Voters Association	Anna Hall	44	0.1	N/A
Scallywagg	Charles Scallywag Wilson	44	0.1	N/A
Rizz Party	Captain Rizz	33	0.1	N/A
Majority		1,440	3.3	N/A
Turnout		42,512	72.7	+1.2
Labour gain from Conservative		Swing	+4.1	

=== Elections in the 1980s ===
General election 1987: Hampstead and Highgate
Party	Candidate	Votes	%	±%
Conservative	Geoffrey Finsberg	19,236	42.5	+1.3
Labour	Philip Turner	17,015	37.6	+3.9
SDP	Anne Sofer	8,744	19.3	−5.5
Rainbow Dream Ticket	Rainbow George Weiss	137	0.3	N/A
Humanist	Sarah Ellis	134	0.3	N/A
Majority		2,221	4.9	−2.6
Turnout		45,266	71.5	+4.6
Conservative hold		Swing		

General election 1983: Hampstead and Highgate
Party	Candidate	Votes	%	±%
Conservative	Geoffrey Finsberg	18,366	41.2	–5.8
Labour	John McDonnell	14,996	33.7	–5.6
SDP	Anne Sofer	11,030	24.8	+11.9
Independent	J.V. Stevenson	156	0.4	N/A
Majority		3,370	7.5	–0.2
Turnout		44,548	66.9	
Registered electors		66,554		
Conservative win (new seat)				

1979 notional result
Party	Vote	%
Conservative	23,229	47.1
Labour	19,384	39.3
Liberal	6,367	12.9
Others	375	0.8
Turnout	49,355	
Electorate		

== See also ==
- List of parliamentary constituencies in London
