= Yule Ritual =

Live album by Hawkwind
- Released: 2001
- Recorded: 29 December 2000
- Venues: London Astoria, London
- Genre: Space rock
- Label: Voiceprint Records
- Producer: Hawkwind

Hawkwind chronology
Spacebrock (2000)	Yule Ritual (2001)	Canterbury Fayre 2001 (2002)

Professional ratings
Review scores
Source	Rating
AllMusic	3.5/5 stars
The Encyclopedia of Popular Music	3/5 stars

Yule Ritual is a 2001 live album by Hawkwind.

== Track listing ==
1. "Electronic Intro" (Hawkwind) – 4:27
2. "Levitation" (Brock) – 8:47
3. "Spacebrock" (Brock) – 6:08
4. "Space Is Deep" (Brock) – 5:45
5. "Flying Doctor" (Calvert, Brock) – 5:04
6. "Warrior at the Edge of Time" (Moorcock, House, King, Powell) – 4:14
7. "Angels of Death" (Brock) – 6:36
8. "High Rise" (Calvert, House) – 5:07
9. "Damage of Life" (Brock) – 6:39
10. "Lighthouse" (Blake) – 7:54
11. "Sonic Attack" (Moorcock, Bainbridge, Brock, Lloyd-Langton) – 5:56
12. "Free Fall" (Calvert, Bainbridge) – 6:32
13. "Motorway City" (Brock) – 6:13
14. "Hurry on Sundown" (Brock) – 3:43
15. "Spirit of the Age" (Calvert, Brock) – 7:06
16. "Assassins of Allah" [aka "Hassan-i-Sabah" (Calvert, Rudolph) / "Space Is Their (Palestine)" (Brock)] – 8:58

== Personnel ==
Hawkwind

- Ron Tree – vocals
- Dave Brock – guitar, keyboards, vocals
- Alan Davey – bass guitar, vocals
- Richard Chadwick – drums
- Simon House – violin
- Harvey Bainbridge – synthesisers
- Tim Blake – synthesisers, vocals
- Jerry Richards – guitar, vocals
- Captain Rizz – vocals on "Assassins of Allah"
- Michael Moorcock – vocals on "Warrior at the Edge of Time" and "Sonic Attack"
- Keith Kniveton – synthesisers
- Jez Huggett – saxophone, flute on some tracks

== Credits ==
- Recorded at London Astoria, 29 December 2000

== Release ==
- Oct-2001: Voiceprint Records, HAWKVP19CD, UK 2CD
