= Make Politicians History =

Minor United Kingdom political party

- Leader: Ronnie Carroll
- Founder: Rainbow George Weiss
- Founded: 1980s
- Dissolved: April 2009
- Ideology: Anti-Parliamentarianism

Website
- www.makepoliticianshistory.org (defunct) www.rainbowrevolution.net (defunct)

Make Politicians History was a minor United Kingdom political party that advocated the abolition of Parliament in favour of devolution to city-states and decision-making by referendum. Its leader was Ronnie Carroll. Since the 1980s, the group stood under various descriptions, including Vote For Yourself, Xat.org and Vote For Yourself Rainbow Dream Ticket.

== Founding ==
The group originated in the 1980s as the Rainbow Alliance of several small groups, founded and led by Rainbow George Weiss, which Weiss says was after he was contacted by "an extraterrestrial soulmate called Sterling Silver". It stood a variety of candidates, often on frivolous platforms. The first candidate was Weiss in the 1984 Enfield Southgate by-election; Michael Portillo won and Weiss polled 48 votes. In the Hampstead and Highgate constituency at the 1992 general election, they stood three candidates. Some minor celebrities such as Cynthia Payne, Liza Duke and Malcolm Hardee stood for the group.

== Rainbow Dream Ticket/Vote For Yourself Dream Ticket ==
The renamed Rainbow Dream Ticket stood 31 candidates in the 1997 general election, polling 4,104 votes. As Vote For Yourself Dream Ticket the party stood Weiss as its candidate in all four Belfast seats in the 2001 general election, pledging to rename Britain and Ireland as the "Emerald Rainbow Isles", to replace the currency with the "Wonder", made up of 100 "gasps", to make utilities, healthcare and education free, and to cancel all debt.

They then stood three candidates in the 2003 Northern Ireland Assembly election, receiving a total of 124 votes.

The party put up candidates in 23 constituencies in the 2005 general election, six in Northern Ireland, four in Cardiff and thirteen in London. Among the party's candidates was David Kerr, a former member of the National Front, a member of Ulster Third Way, and editor of Ulster Nation, and Lynda Gilby, a Belfast journalist. They came last or second-last in every seat in which they stood. Weiss stood in 13 London seats, receiving a total of 1,289 votes. In the Cardiff North constituency, candidate Catherine Taylor-Dawson, a singer-songwriter, received only one vote, thus setting a new record for the lowest vote for any parliamentary candidate under universal suffrage. The single vote was not cast by Taylor-Dawson, as she was not registered to vote in that constituency.

== Make Politicians History ==
The party was renamed Make Politicians History on 26 September 2005, led by Ronnie Carroll. The first action was to announce in January 2006 a referendum fronted by snooker player Alex Higgins, in which postcards were sent to all residents in Belfast calling for the city to be renamed "Best" and made self-governing. The party wanted Ulster residents to make decisions issue by issue through an electronic voting system. The party released a music CD, Let's Tick Together, in May 2006. Weiss stood in the four Belfast constituencies in the Northern Ireland Assembly elections in 2007, receiving a sixth preference vote from Sinn Féin leader Gerry Adams. Ronnie Carroll stood in the 2008 Haltemprice and Howden by-election, and received 29 votes. A "Brand Spanking New London Party" with Russell Brand as its candidate for Mayor of London was announced, but did not stand.

== Disbanding ==
"I have been so impressed with what I have heard and seen from your politicians on the news in the last week or two, I see no need for the party anymore."

— Weiss in April 2009

The party was disbanded in April 2009, reportedly due to Weiss being impressed at the progress of the Northern Ireland peace process after the Massereene Barracks shooting, and it was deregistered on 8 June 2009.

== See also ==
- Make Politicians History election results
