= Spacebrock =

Studio album by Hawkwind
- Released: January 29, 2001
- Recorded: 2000
- Genres: Space rock; hard rock
- Length: 51:13
- Label: Voiceprint
- Producer: Dave Brock

Hawkwind chronology
In Your Area (1999)	Spacebrock (2001)	Yule Ritual (2001)

Professional ratings
Review scores
Source	Rating
Allmusic	2.5/5 stars
The Encyclopedia of Popular Music	2/5 stars

Spacebrock is the 23rd studio album by Hawkwind, released in 2001, although the lack of contributors and title has prompted suggestions that it is a de facto Dave Brock solo album.

== Track listing ==
1. "Life Form" (Brock) - 1:42 - previously released on PXR5
2. "Some People Never Die" (Brock) 4:02 - previously released on Church of Hawkwind
3. "Dreamers" (Brock) - 3:40
4. "Earth Breath" (Brock) - 1:36
5. "You Burn Me Up" (Brock) - 4:34
6. "The Right Way" (Brock) - 0:53
7. "Sex Dreams" (Brock, Jameson, Swift, Walker) - 3:48
8. "To Be or Not" (Brock) - 2:12
9. "Kauai" (Brock) - 1:35 - previously released on Distant Horizons
10. "Earth Calling" (Brock) - 3:47
11. "The Starkness of the Capsule" (Brock) - 3:13
12. "Behind the Face" (Brock) - 3:15
13. "Space Brock" (Brock) - 4:47
14. "Space Pilots" (Brock) - 2:01
15. "1st Landing" (Brock, Calvert) - 1:46
16. "The Journey" (Brock) - 2:48 - not related to the track of the same name on Alien 4
17. "Do You Want This Body" (Brock) - 6:34

== Personnel ==
Hawkwind

- Dave Brock - guitar, bass guitar, keyboards, vocals
- Richard Chadwick - drums on "Dreamers", "Earth Calling" and "Space Pilots"
- Crum - keyboards on "Dreamers"
- Beano Jameson, Robert Swift, Dez Walker - synthesizers and sequencers on "Sex Dreams"

== Release history ==
January 2001: Voiceprint, HAWKVP18CD
