= Distant Horizons =

Studio album by Hawkwind
- Released: 3 November 1997
- Recorded: January–July 1997
- Studio: Earth Studios, Devon
- Genre: Space rock; progressive rock; heavy metal; techno
- Length: 51:33
- Label: Emergency Broadcast System
- Producer: Hawkwind

Hawkwind chronology
Love in Space (1996)	Distant Horizons (1997)	Hawkwind 1997 (1999)

Professional ratings
Review scores
Source	Rating
Allmusic	3.5/5 stars

Distant Horizons is the twenty-first studio album by the English space rock group Hawkwind, released in 1997.

Towards the end of 1996, Jerry Richards, who had been contributing lead guitar to some live dates and recording sessions, joined the group permanently. Dissatisfied with the musical direction of the group, longstanding bassist Alan Davey chose to leave at the end of 1996. His bass playing duties were picked up by singer Ron Tree. Rastafarian toaster Captain Rizz and keyboardist Julian "Crum" Crimmins began contributing to live dates, although neither would appear on this record.

The album's release was preceded by the Love in Space EP, although the lead track differs remarkably from the album version, having vocals and being produced by Zeus B. Held.

The group undertook a 32 date UK tour from September through to November to promote the album, followed by three Netherlands/Belgium dates. Some shows were recorded and issued as In Your Area and Hawkwind 1997, and some shows were professionally filmed by punkcast, but as yet unreleased.

== Track listing ==
No.	Title	Writer(s)	Length
1.	"Distant Horizons"	Dave Brock, Richard Chadwick	5:19
2.	"Phetamine Street"	Ron Tree	5:42
3.	"Waimea Canyon Drive"	Brock	4:53
4.	"Alchemy"	Jerry Richards, Chadwick	3:14
5.	"Clouded Vision"	Brock	3:49
6.	"Reptoid Vision"	Tree	7:39
7.	"Population Overload"	Brock, Chadwick	6:51
8.	"Wheels"	Richards, Chadwick	6:24
9.	"Kauai / Taxi for Max"	Brock	2:51
10.	"Love in Space"	Brock	4:51

Atomhenge CD bonus tracks
No.	Title	Writer(s)	Length
11.	"Archaic"	Brock	6:51
12.	"Kauai" (Alternate take)	Brock	2:45
13.	"Morpheus"	Brock	2:26

== Personnel ==
Hawkwind

- Dave Brock – electric guitar, keyboards, vocals
- Jerry Richards – electric guitar
- Ron Tree – vocals, bass guitar
- Richard Chadwick – drums

== Charts ==
Chart (1997)	Peak position
UK Independent Albums (Official Charts)	37

== Release history ==
- November 1997: Emergency Broadcast System Records, UK, CD (EBS139)
- 30 May 2011: Atomhenge (Cherry Red) Records, ATOMCD1028, UK CD.
- 2020: Atomhenge (Cherry Red) Records, ATOMCD51044, UK 5CD Remastered Clamshell; The Emergency Broadcast Years 1994 – 1997 with The Business Trip Live, Alien 4 and Love in Space.
