= Take Me to Your Leader (Hawkwind album) =

Studio album by Hawkwind
- Released: 12 September 2005
- Genre: Space rock
- Length: 50:00
- Label: Voiceprint
- Producer: Dave Brock

Hawkwind chronology
Spaced Out in London (2004)	Take Me to Your Leader (2005)	Take Me to Your Future (2006)

Professional ratings
Review scores
Source	Rating
Allmusic	3.5/5 stars
The Encyclopedia of Popular Music	4/5 stars

Take Me to Your Leader is the twenty fourth studio album by UK rock group Hawkwind. Released in 2005, it was their first studio album in five years. It featured guest appearances by Arthur Brown, Lene Lovich, the television presenter Matthew Wright and past member Lemmy. The first 2000 copies came with a DVD containing interviews with band members and some live and "behind the scenes" footage .

== Track listing ==
=== CD ===
1. "Spirit of the Age" (Brock, Calvert) – 6:43
2. "Out Here We Are" (Davey) – 5:56
3. "Greenback Massacre" (Davey) – 4:14
4. "To Love a Machine" (Brock) – 6:00
5. "Take Me to Your Leader" (Brock, Chadwick, Davey) – 5:50
6. "Digital Nation" (Chadwick) – 5:25
7. "Sunray" (Brown) – 3:55
8. "Sighs" (Brock, Davey) – 1:22
9. "Angela Android" (Brock, Chadwick) – 5:08
10. "A Letter to Robert" (Brock, Brown, Chadwick) – 6:08

=== Bonus DVD ===
1. Interview With Dave Brock
2. Interview With Alan Davey
3. Interview With Richard Chadwick
4. "Spirit of the Age" – Promo
5. "Silver Machine" – Ruisrock Festival, Finland, 10 July 2004
6. "The Right to Decide" – Live 1992
7. "Spirit of the Age" – Live 2004
8. "Psychedelic Warriors" – Live 2004

== Personnel ==
Hawkwind

- Dave Brock – guitar, vocals, keyboards
- Alan Davey – bass guitar, vocals, keyboards
- Richard Chadwick – drums, percussion and programming

with

- James Clemas – organ (tracks 1 and 7)
- Matthew Wright – vocals (track 1)
- Jez Huggett – saxophone (tracks 2 and 6)
- Jason Stuart – keyboards (tracks 3 and 4)
- Simon House – keyboards and violin (tracks 7 and 9)
- Arthur Brown – vocals (tracks 7 and 10)
- Lene Lovich – vocals (track 9)
- Lemmy – vocals, bass (DVD track 5)
- Phil Caivano – guitar (DVD track 5)

== Charts ==
Chart (2005)	Peak position
UK Independent Albums (OCC)	32
UK Rock & Metal Albums (OCC)	22
