= Hawkfest =

Hawkwind-themed outdoor weekend festival

Hawkfest is three-day outdoor weekend festival organised and centered on Hawkwind. The event is open only to members of their fanclub and is limited to around 1000 attendees.

The stated intention is to recreate the atmosphere of festivals of old, as an alternative to the currently heavily commercialised events, and to make the whole event as family-friendly as possible with side attractions and workshops. Hawkfest was proposed by Dave Brock as a "realist" alternative to the free festival culture of the 1960s.

== 2002 ==
- Date: 19–21 July 2002
- Location: Three Horseshoes Farm, nr. Seaton, Devon, England.

=== Schedule ===
- Friday: Bedouin, Mr Quimby's Beard, Bruise, Litmus
- Saturday: Hawkwind, Astralasia (with Simon House & Pete Pracownik), Spacehead, Tribe of Cro, The One Eyed Bishops, Proteus
- Sunday: Huw Lloyd Langton's Broken Bits Band (Huw Lloyd Langdon, Mr Dibs, Martin & Jack Griffin, Lloyd George, Mik), Judge Trev, Connecting Routes, Tim Blake
- Acoustic Tent: Jez Huggett's Band of Gold

=== Hawkwind set ===
- Set: Intro; Earth Calling; Night of the Hawks; Flying Doctor; LSD; For Kirsty; Strange Flower; Lighthouse; Spiral Galaxy; Spirit of the Age; Damnation Alley; The Watcher; Brainbox Pollution; You Shouldn't Do That; Earth Calling Reprise; Motorway City; Hurry on Sundown
- Line-Up: Dave Brock; Alan Davey; Simon House; Tim Blake; Richard Chadwick; Danny Thompson; Huw Lloyd Langton; Jez Huggett; Keith Kniveton; Captain Rizz

=== CD release ===
CD1

1. Hawkwind - "Night of the Hawks"
2. Proteus - "Evenstar" / "Cloud City"
3. Tribe of Cro - "I Have No Life"
4. Spacehead - "Fire Dragons"
5. Astralasia - "Uncle Sam's on Mars"
6. Jez Huggett's Band of Gold - "Kansas City Blues"

CD2

1. Bruise - "Miss Bigfish"
2. Connecting Routes - "Intro"
3. Mr Quimby's Beard - "Mystery"
4. Bedouin - "LSD"
5. Litmus - "Invader"
6. Huw Lloyd Langton's Broken Bits Band - "Cardboard City"
7. The One Eyed Bishops - "Hurry on Sundown"

== 2003 ==
- Date: 8–10 August 2003
- Location: Garstang, nr. Preston, Lancashire, England
- Info: The first 500 ticket holders received a free limited-edition CD promo for the Hawkfest 2002 2CD.

=== Schedule ===
- Friday: Arthur Brown and Instant Flight, Big Amongst Sheep
- Saturday: Hawkwind, Harvey Bainbridge, Spacehead, Litmus, Mr. Quimby's Beard
- Sunday: Drunk in Public, Sophia Dean
- Barn: Afresco Mantis, Alien Dream, Assassins of Silence, Tribe of Cro, Tarantism

=== Hawkwind set ===
- Set: Arrival in Utopia; Time Captives; The Watcher; Magnu; Chronoglide Skyway; The Right Stuff; Wings; Hurry on Sundown; Brainbox Pollution; Spirit of the Age; Green Finned Demon; In The Trees; Abducted; Angela Android; Assault & Battery; The Golden Void; Where Are They Now?; Assassins of Allah; Master of the Universe
- Line-Up: Dave Brock; Simon House; Alan Davey; Richard Chadwick; Arthur Brown; Keith Barton; Mr. Dibs; Harvey Bainbridge; Huw Lloyd Langton; Keith Kniveton

== 2007 ==
- Date: 15–17 June 2007
- Location: Donington Park Farmhouse, Melbourne Road, Isley Walton, Castle Donington, Leicestershire, England.
