= Esther (TV series) =

1994–2002 British TV series

- Presented by: Esther Rantzen
- Country of origin: United Kingdom
- Original language: English
- No. of episodes: Over 600

Production
- Running time: 60 minutes

Original release
- Network: BBC Two
- Release: 24 October 1994 – 9 May 2002

Esther is a British talk show presented by Esther Rantzen. It was aired on BBC Two between 24 October 1994 and 9 May 2002 and over 600 episodes were made.
