= Canterbury Fayre 2001 =

Live album by Hawkwind
- Released: 4 February 2003
- Recorded: 18 August 2001
- Genre: Space rock
- Label: Voiceprint
- Producer: Hawkwind

Hawkwind chronology
Yule Ritual (2001)	Canterbury Fayre 2001 (2003)	Spaced Out in London (2004)

Professional ratings
Review scores
Source	Rating
Allmusic	4/5 stars
The Encyclopedia of Popular Music	2/5 stars

Canterbury Fayre 2001 is a 2001 live album by Hawkwind.

== Track listing ==
1. "5th Second of Forever" (Lloyd-Langton, Brock) – 3:52
2. "Levitation" (Brock) – 9:18
3. "Spiral Galaxy" (House) – 3:16
4. "Solitary Mind Games" (Lloyd-Langton) – 8:08
5. "Angels of Death" (Brock) – 6:17
6. "Spirit of the Age" (Calvert, Brock) – 7:35
7. "Magnu" (Brock) – 3:43
8. "Dust of Time" [excerpt] (Bainbridge, Brock, Lloyd-Langton) – 2:08
9. "Motorway City" (Brock) – 6:11
10. "Hurry on Sundown" (Brock) – 3:44
11. "Assassins of Allah" [aka "Hassan-i-Sabah" (Calvert, Rudolph) / "Space Is Their (Palestine)" (Brock)] – 12:25
12. "Silver Machine" (Calvert, Brock) – 5:16
13. "Arthur's Poem" (Brown) – 0:55
14. "Assault and Battery" (Brock) – 2:51
15. "Void of Golden Light" [aka "The Golden Void"] (Brock) – 10:44
16. "Ejection" (Calvert) – 8:18

== Personnel ==
Hawkwind

- Dave Brock - guitar, keyboards, vocals
- Simon House - violin
- Keith Kniveton - synthesisers
- Alan Davey - bass guitar, vocals
- Richard Chadwick - drums
- Huw Lloyd-Langton - guitar, vocals
- Arthur Brown - vocals on "Silver Machine" and "Arthur's Poem"

== Credits ==
- Herne Hill, Mount Ephraim Gardens, Music Festival, 18 August 2001

== Release ==
- Dec-2002: Voiceprint Records, HAWKVP22CD, UK 2CD
