= Tottenham War Services Institute =

Charity in London, England

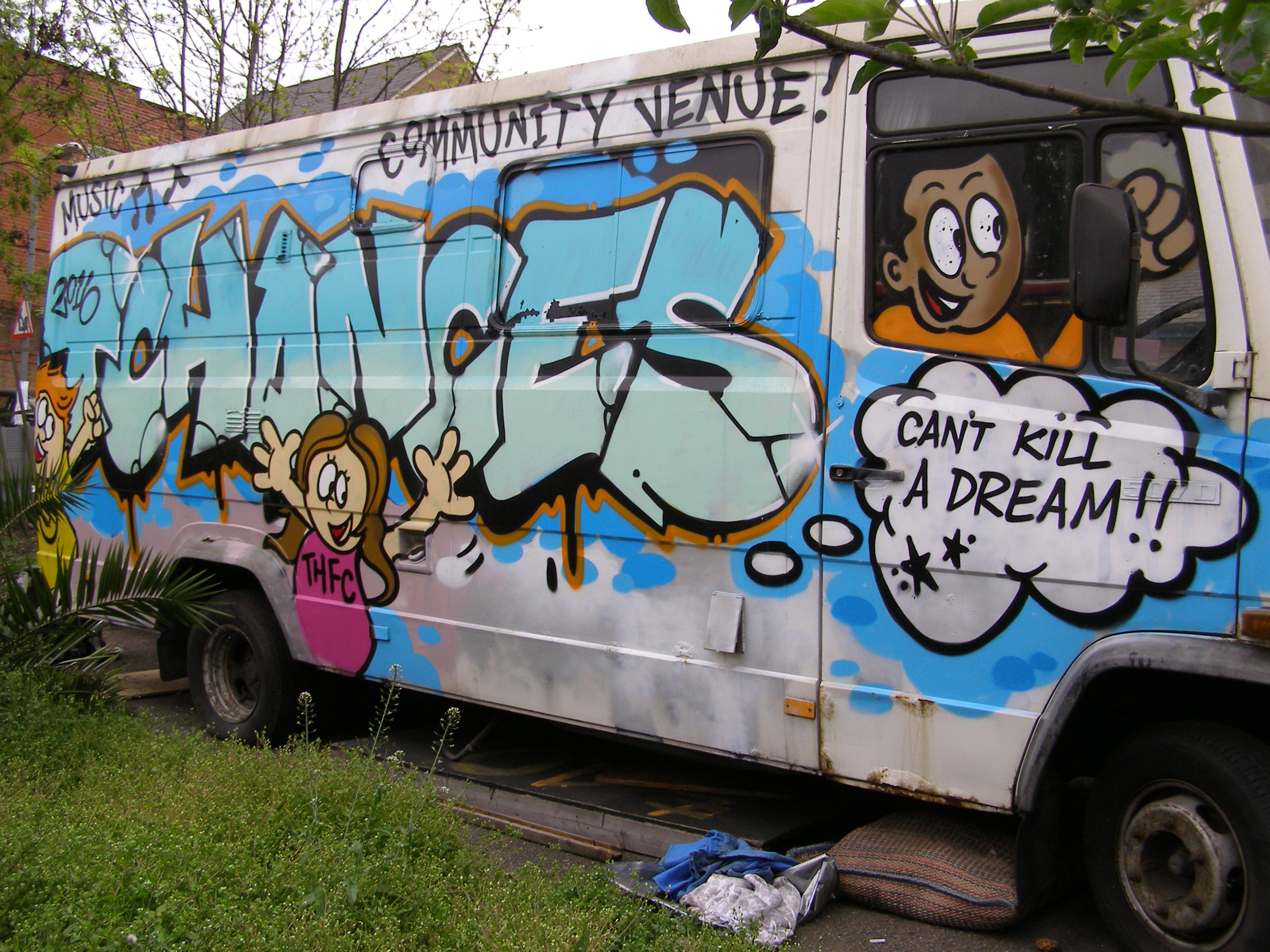
- Mural at TWSI, by OWED, 2016
- Abbreviation: TWSI
- Founded: 12 October 1920; 105 years ago
- Founders: William Henry Prescott, Patrick Bernard Malone, et al
- Type: Charitable Trust
- Registration no.: 217176
- Location: 399 Tottenham High Road, London, N17 6QN, United Kingdom
- Coordinates: 51°35′23.7″N 0°04′14.5″W
- Region served: Tottenham and North East London
- Key people: Penelope Ann Potter (Chair), Sedleigh Seon Adams (Secretary), Bruce McCrorie, and Samuel Cox

The Tottenham War Services Institute (TWSI) was founded by a deed of trust in 1920.

== Description ==
The TWSI is a registered charity, entrusted to use its property "as an Institute providing for the use of its members the means of social intercourse, mutual helpfulness, mental and moral improvement, rational recreation, and the other advantages of a Club" for ex-servicemen, their families, and vulnerable members of the wider community.

== Location ==
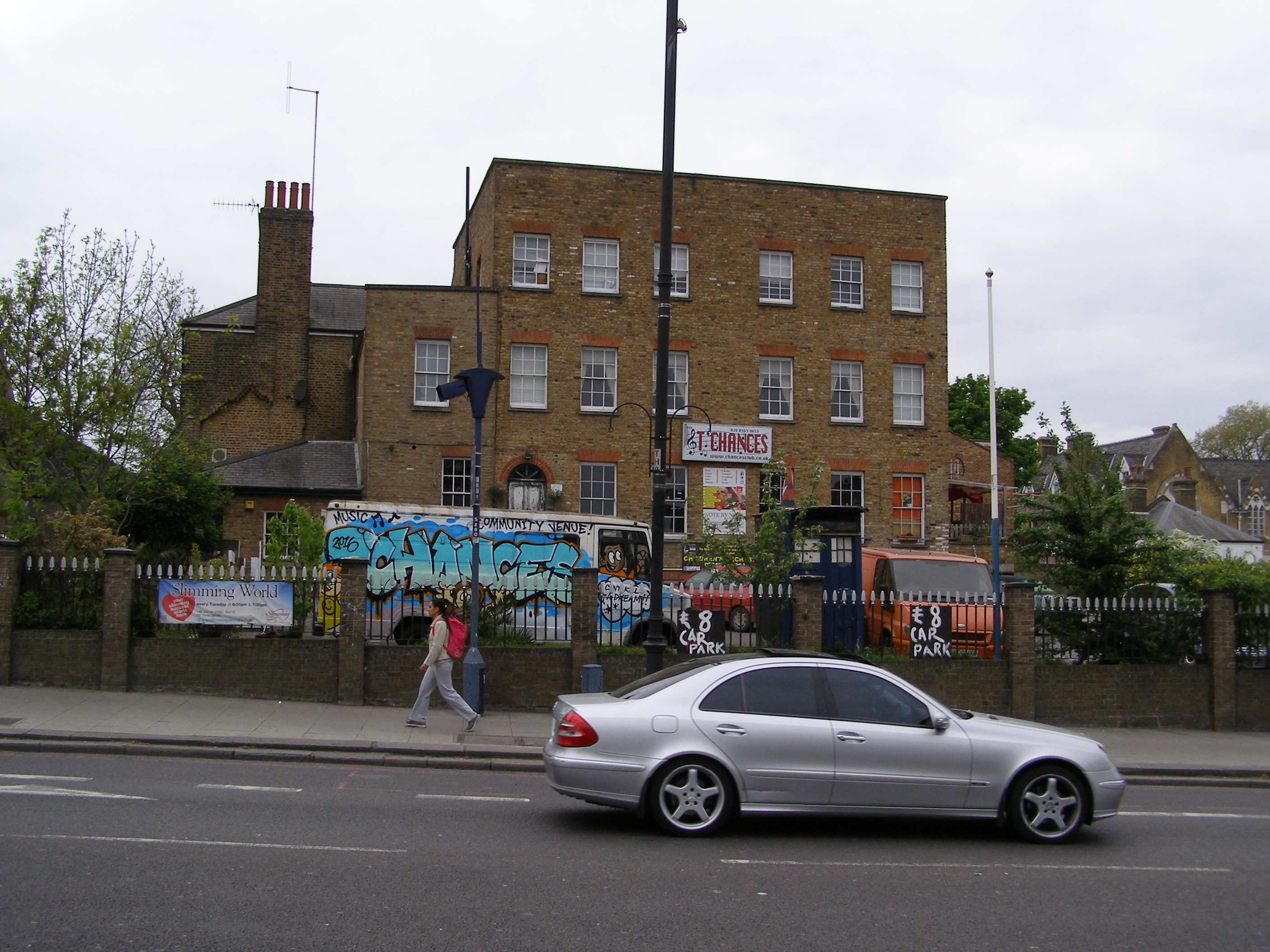
Photograph of 399 Tottenham High Road, London, N17 6QN, United Kingdom

For many decades until 2008, the building was a British Legion club. Fire destroyed much of the property on 13 October 1987, and the rebuilt structure was reopened on 14 April 1989. From 1995 to 2012, the building's top floors housed an annex of the nearby Tottenham police station. The top floors were home to the Footsteps Vocational Academy (a Pupil Referral Unit), and until April 2017, the Note By Note Music Academy.

But it was most well known for housing the T. Chances community centre (formerly known as Tottenham Chances). Supported by the Reknaw sound system, T. Chances has gained a profile as one of London' major punk rock venues.

Notable figures associated with T. Chances included the musician Captain Rizz, and the poet Xochitl Tuck, who ran regular Survivors Poetry nights at the venue until her death in 2012.

As of 2020, the TWSI began operating out of the county of Somerset (South West England), stating on the register of charities held by the Charity Commission of England and Wales: "In 2020 trustees made the decision to move from a London hub to participate in other parts of the country".

== In the media ==
Penny Potter has given several interviews discussing the charity.

The TWSI's property was a topic of discussion in a 16 July 2009 meeting of the Haringey Council.

== Key documents ==
Original deed of trust founding the Tottenham War Services Institute, 12 October 1920

1950 transcription of the original deed of trust: Tottenham War Services Institute, 12 October 1920

2017 transcription of the original deed of trust: Tottenham War Services Institute, 12th October 1920
