= Knights of Space =

Live album by Hawkwind
- Released: 26 May 2008
- Recorded: 19 December 2007
- Venue: Astoria Theatre, London
- Genre: Space rock
- Label: Vision Music
- Producer: Hawkwind

Hawkwind chronology
Take Me to Your Future (2006)	Knights of Space (2008)	Blood of the Earth (2010)

Knights of Space is a live album by Hawkwind recorded at their annual London Christmas gig at the Astoria on 19 December 2007 and released in August 2008. It is released as an audio (2xCD) and video (2xDVD)

== Track listing ==
1. "Black Corridor" (Michael Moorcock)
2. "Aero Space Age Inferno" (Robert Calvert)
3. "Space Love" (Hawkwind)
4. "The Awakening" (Calvert)
5. "Orgone Accumulator" (Calvert, Dave Brock)
6. "Paradox" (Brock)
7. "Robot" (Calvert, Brock)
8. "Abducted" (Tree, Brock)
9. "Alien (I Am)" (Brock)
10. "Alien Poem" (Hawkwind)
11. "Master of the Universe" (Nik Turner, Brock)
12. "Time We Left" (Brock)
13. "Lighthouse" (Tim Blake)
14. "Arrival in Utopia" (Brock)
15. "Damnation Alley" (Calvert, Brock, Simon House)
16. "Sonic Attack" (Moorcock)
17. "Welcome to the Future" (Calvert)
18. "Flying Doctor" (Calvert, Brock)
19. "Silver Machine" (Calvert, Brock)

== Personnel ==
Hawkwind

- Dave Brock - guitar, keyboards, vocals
- Tim Blake - keyboards, theremin
- Jason Stuart - keyboards
- Mr. Dibs - bass guitar, vocals
- Richard Chadwick - drums, vocals

== Release history ==
- May 2008: Vision Music - 2×CD
- May 2008: Vision Music - 2×DVD
