= Spaced Out in London =

Live album by Hawkwind
- Released: 2004
- Recorded: 13 December 2002
- Venue: Walthamstow Assembly Hall, London
- Genre: Space rock
- Label: Voiceprint
- Producer: Hawkwind

Hawkwind chronology
Canterbury Fayre 2001 (2002)	Spaced Out in London (2004)	Take Me to Your Leader (2005)

Professional ratings
Review scores
Source	Rating
The Encyclopedia of Popular Music	3/5 stars

Spaced Out in London is a 2004 live album by Hawkwind. It was recorded at a 2002 gig.

== Track listing ==
1. "Earth Calling" (Robert Calvert)
2. "Aerospaceage Inferno" (Calvert)
3. "Angels of Death" (Dave Brock)
4. "Out of the Shadows" (Buckley, Brock, Alan Davey)
5. "Time Captives" (Arthur Brown)
6. "Master of the Universe" (Nik Turner, Brock)
7. "The Gremlin Song" (Calvert)
8. "Time and Confusion" (Brown)
9. "Hurry On Sundown" (Brock)
10. "Lighthouse" (Tim Blake)
11. "The Watcher" (Lemmy Kilmister)
12. "Assassins of Allah" [aka "Hassan I Sabbah"/"Space Is Their (Palestine)"] (Calvert, Paul Rudolph, Brock)
13. "Do That" [aka "You Shouldn't Do That"] (Turner, Brock)
14. "Earth Calling" (Calvert)

== Personnel ==
Hawkwind

- Arthur Brown - vocals
- Dave Brock - guitar, keyboards, vocals
- Alan Davey - bass guitar, vocals
- Tim Blake - keyboards, vocals, virtual lead guitar
- Richard Chadwick - drums

== Credits ==
Recorded at Walthamstow Assembly Hall, London, 13 December 2002 by Colin Allen

== Release history ==
- Apr 2004: Voiceprint Records, HAWKSR001CD - limited edition sold at gigs and through the Hawkwind website.
