= Rainbow George Weiss =

British fringe political candidate (1940–2021)

Personal details
- Born: George Weiss; 13 October 1940 Hampstead, London, United Kingdom
- Died: 1 December 2021 (aged 81) Highgate, London, United Kingdom
- Party: Make Politicians History; Vote For Yourself Rainbow Dream Ticket

Rainbow George Weiss (13 October 1940 – 1 December 2021) was a British political figure and serial fringe political party candidate in various elections in the UK.

== Life and career ==
The son of a diamond merchant, Weiss worked for his father in Hatton Garden for 15 years. He became a frequent gambler when it became legal to bet on the high street on 1 May 1961. He was a long time Newcastle United supporter since the 1952 FA Cup Final. Later in life, he very nearly recruited their former striker, Jackie Milburn, to stand for his Captain Rainbow's Universal Party in 1985 in Tyne Bridge.

As a political candidate, he stood in 13 constituencies in the 2005 general election, polling 1,289 votes in total.

He founded his own parties from the proceeds of the sale of a mews house in Hampstead, north London, which he moved into in 1969, but stopped paying rent in 1984, remaining there as a squatter for the required 12 years. He was a neighbour and friend of Peter Cook. He made a profit of £710,000 from the sale of the house in 2004 after HM Land Registry awarded him possessory ownership of the property, known as acquiring title by adverse possession.

Weiss moved for a brief period to Ireland before returning to London. He spent his final years in a Highgate retirement home in London. He died on 1 December 2021, at the age of 81.

== Politics ==
Weiss founded his own political party, the Vote For Yourself Rainbow Dream Ticket, and first stood for the European Parliament in 1994 in the London Central constituency. He was also a candidate at the 2001 general election for the Belfast East constituency, where he won a total of 71 votes

Weiss was a candidate at the 2003 Brent East by-election, standing for the www.xat.org party, won by Liberal Democrat Sarah Teather, in which he came bottom of a list of 16 candidates with just eleven votes. While this vote was considerably low, lower votes had previously been registered: for example, in the 1988 by-election in Kensington a candidate had polled just five votes. The Vote For Yourself Rainbow Dream Ticket election record was also "surpassed" at the 2005 general election when British model Catherine Taylor-Dawson stood for the party in Cardiff North and achieved a single vote, though not from Taylor-Dawson herself, who was not eligible to vote in that constituency. Weiss himself set a new election record by simultaneously standing in 13 constituencies.

In 2005, Weiss proposed a "preferendum" where voters choose individual policies selected from those offered by each of the major parties. He also proposed that Cardiff and Belfast should become independent city states.

He stood in all four Belfast constituencies during the 2007 Northern Ireland Assembly election. Standing for his Make Politicians History Party, he came third last in South Belfast and last in the three other constituencies with a total of 221 first preference votes.

In the 2017 general election, Weiss joined forces with the Official Monster Raving Loony Party. Together, they received 3,733 votes and did not come last.
