= Captain Rizz =

British musician and community organiser

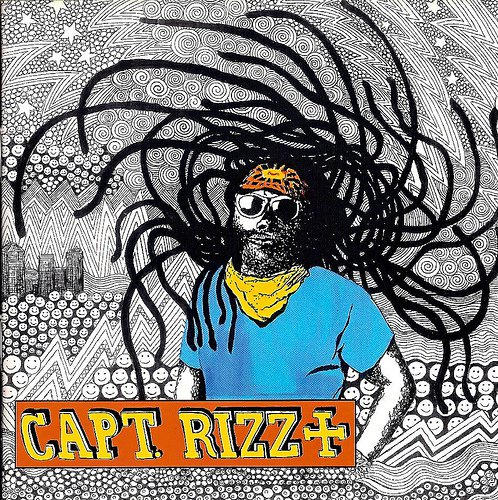

Background information
- Origin: London, United Kingdom
- Occupation: Musician
- Instrument(s): Vocals, drums
- Years active: 1977–present
- Labels: Griffin Music, Emergency Broadcast System, Warriors Dance, Top Rizz International

Captain Rizz is a British musician and community organiser. As a vocalist for Hawkwind from 1997 to 2000, he was described as a "Space Reggae toaster".

Rizz ran for Parliament several times, associated with Make Politicians History, on the Rizz Party ticket. In the 1992 General Election he ran for the Parliamentary seat in Hampstead and Highgate. In the 1997 General Election, he ran for the seat in Hampstead and Highgate seat, as well as the seat in Lewisham East. He ran for the Tottenham seat in 2010, and it was announced that he would be standing as a 2015 candidate for the seat on the Class War ticket.

Rizz has volunteered at the T. Chances community centre in Tottenham, London.
