= Downwind (album) =

Studio album by Pierre Moerlen's Gong
- Released: 9 February 1979
- Recorded: June–September, 1978
- Genre: Jazz fusion
- Length: 40:06
- Label: Arista
- Producer: Pierre Moerlen

Pierre Moerlen's Gong chronology
Expresso II (1978)	Downwind (1979)	Time Is the Key (1979)

Professional ratings
Review scores
Source	Rating
Allmusic	4/5 stars

Downwind is the third album by Pierre Moerlen's Gong, although it was the first to be released under that name, the previous two having been released as Gong albums for contractual reasons. It was released in February 1979.

Featuring a mostly instrumental jazz-driven sound, it was notable for the prominent use of vibraphone. Downwind marks a slight departure from the formula of the previous de facto Pierre Moerlen's Gong's albums, Gazeuse! and Expresso II. "Aeroplane" and "What You Know" are short-form pop songs with vocals, the only time that Moerlen would attempt this. The lengthy title track displays an emerging progressive rock influence and features lead guitar by Mike Oldfield (for whom Moerlen was also playing at the time), keyboards by Steve Winwood and saxophone by ex-Gong member Didier Malherbe. For the first time, keyboards augment or replace mallet percussion on some tracks.

== Track listing ==
No.	Title	Music	Length
1.	"Aeroplane"	Pierre Moerlen, Ruan O'Lochlain	2:42
2.	"Crosscurrents"	Moerlen	6:13
3.	"Downwind"	Moerlen	12:34
4.	"Jin-Go-Lo-Ba"	Babatunde Olatunji	3:27
5.	"What You Know"	Moerlen, O'Lochlain	3:44
6.	"Emotions"	Moerlen	4:46
7.	"Xtasea"	Moerlen	6:40

== Personnel ==
Pierre Moerlen's Gong

- Pierre Moerlen – drums (1–5, 7), vibraphone (3, 6), marimba (3), concert toms (3–4), timpani (3, 7), organ (1, 7), synthesizer (2–7), electric piano (1–2), assorted percussion (3, 7), lead vocals (1), glockenspiel (3), cowbell (4), timbales (4), vocals (4–5)
- Benoît Moerlen – vibraphone (1–2, 5, 7)
- Hansford Rowe – bass (1–2, 4–5, 7), Wal Bass (2–3), vocals (4)
- François Causse – marimba (2, 4), congas (2, 4–5)
- Ross Record – guitar (1–2, 4, 7), vocals (1, 4), rhythm guitar (5)

Former Pierre Moerlen's Gong

- Didier Malherbe – saxophone (3)

Additional personnel

- Didier Lockwood – violin (2, 6–7)
- Mike Oldfield – guitar (3), solina strings, bass (3), Irish drum (3)
- Steve Winwood – synthesizer (3)
- Terry Oldfield – flute (3)
- Mick Taylor – guitar (5)
