= Gong est Mort, Vive Gong =

Live album by Gong
- Released: November 1977
- Recorded: 28 May 1977 Hippodrome, Paris, France
- Length: 76:00
- Label: Tapioca Records

Gong chronology
Gong Live Etc. (1977)	Gong est Mort, Vive Gong (1977)	Expresso II (1978)

Professional ratings
Review scores
Source	Rating
Allmusic	3/5 stars

Gong est Mort, Vive Gong (translated as "Gong Is Dead, Long Live Gong") is a double live album by the progressive rock group Gong, recorded on 28 May 1977 at the Hippodrome, Paris, France, and originally released in 1977 as a double LP by Tapioca Records, France.

== Overview ==
Gong appeared as the headlining act in a 24-hour marathon festival which also included sets by Tim Blake, Lady June, Strontium 90, Steve Hillage, "Shamal Gong", "Gong-Expresso" and Daevid Allen & Euterpe. The poster advertising the event can be seen in the photo collage included in the album Gong Live Etc, also released in 1977.

The Gong lineup was a reunion of the Angel's Egg/You-era band, featuring the return of Daevid Allen, Gilli Smyth, Steve Hillage and Miquette Giraudy, who had left in 1975 and so were not part of the then-current Gong-Expresso (which would eventually change its name to Pierre Moerlen's Gong).

Their set included most of the music from four albums - Camembert Electrique and the three albums of the Radio Gnome Invisible trilogy - therefore this album documents less than half of the performance and some songs are absent or incomplete. Many are slightly renamed from their original titles.

== Track listing ==
=== Side one ===
1. "Can't Kill Me" (Daevid Allen) – 7:53
2. "I've Been Stoned Before" (Allen) / "Mister Long Shanks" (Allen) / "O Mother" (Allen) – 6:39
3. "Radio Gnome Invisible" (Allen) – 2:39

=== Side two ===
1. "Zero the Hero and the Witch's Spell" (Allen, Christian Tritsch) – 10:04
2. "Flute Salade" (Didier Malherbe) / "Oily Way" (Allen, Malherbe) / "Outer Temple" (Blake, Hillage) – 10:09

=== Side three ===
1. "Inner Temple (Zero Meets The Octave Doctor)" (Allen, Malherbe) – 6:01
2. "IAO Chant and Master Builder" (C.O.I.T.) – 7:05
3. "Sprinkling of Clouds" (C.O.I.T.) – 4:50

=== Side four ===
1. "From the Isle Of Every Where to the End of the Story of Zero the Hero" (C.O.I.T.) – 12:14
2. "You Never Blow Your Trip For Ever" (C.O.I.T.) – 8:26

== Personnel ==
- Bert Camembert (Daevid Allen) – vocals, guitar
- Shakti Yoni (Gilli Smyth) – space whisper
- High T. Moonweed (Tim Blake) – synthesizer, keyboards
- Bloomdido Bad de Grass (Didier Malherbe) – Selmer sax, flute
- Le Pere Cushion de Strasbourger (Pierre Moerlen) – drums, percussion
- Mister T. Being (Mike Howlett) – souper bass
- Steve Hillage – lead guitar, vocals
- Miquette Giraudy – synthesizer, vocals

=== Credits ===
- Andy Scott – engineer
- Daevid Allen, Christian Gence – mix at Studio Izason, Paris
- Venux De Luxe (Francis Linon) – live sound
- Grant Cunlisse – stage management
- Martin Sylvie – inner sleeve photo
- Daevid Allen – outer cover
