= Gong Live Etc. =

Live album by Gong
- Released: July 1977
- Recorded: May 1973 – September 1975
- Length: 78:33
- Label: Virgin
- Producer: Mike Howlett & Phil Newell

Gong chronology
Gazeuse! (1976)	Gong Live Etc. (1977)	Gong est Mort, Vive Gong (1977)

Professional ratings
Review scores
Source	Rating
Allmusic.com	4.5/5.0 stars

Gong Live Etc. is a live album by Gong, recorded between 1973 and 1975 and originally released in 1977. It is a set of live recordings (including some two-track "off-the-desk" material), studio out-takes and BBC session recordings spanning the years 1973 to 1975.

== Track listing ==
Credits to C.O.I.T. refer to Compagnie d'Opera Invisible de Thibet, an alternative collective name for Gong.

=== Side one ===
1. "You Can't Kill Me" (Daevid Allen) – 6:50 – lineup A, 1973
2. "Zero the Hero and the Witch's Spell" (Allen, Christian Tritsch) – 11:08 – lineup A, 1973
3. "Flying Teapot" (Allen, Francis Moze) – 6:28 – lineup A, 1973

=== Side two ===
1. "Dynamite / I Am Your Animal" (Gilli Smyth, Tritsch) – 5:44 – lineup A, 1973
2. "6/8" (C.O.I.T.) – 3:53 – lineup A, 1973
3. "Est-ce que Je Suis" (Allen) – 4:12 – lineup A, 1973
4. "Ooby-Scooby Doomsday or The D-Day DJ's Got the D.D.T. Blues" (Allen) – 5:15 – lineup A, 1973 – studio, track omitted on single-CD editions

=== Side three ===
1. "Radio Gnome Invisible" (Allen) – 7:35 – lineup B, 1974 – studio, BBC
2. "Oily Way" (Allen, Didier Malherbe) – 3:20 – lineup B, 1974 – studio, BBC
3. "Outer Temple" (Tim Blake, Steve Hillage) – 1:05 – lineup B, 1974 – studio, BBC
4. "Inner Temple" (Allen, Malherbe) – 5:15 – lineup B, 1974 – studio, BBC
5. "Where Have All the Flowers Gone?" (C.O.I.T.) – 3:07 – lineup A, 1974 – studio

=== Side four ===
1. "Isle of Everywhere" (C.O.I.T.) – 10:24 – lineup C, 1975
2. "Get It Inner" (C.O.I.T.) – 2:31 – lineup C, 1975
3. "Master Builder" (C.O.I.T.) – 5:56 – lineup C, 1975
4. "Flying Teapot (Reprise)" (Allen, Moze) – 1:55 – lineup C, 1975

== Sources ==
- Side 1:
  - tracks 1−2: Bataclan, Paris, France, May 1973
  - track 3: Edinburgh Festival, Scotland, August 1973
- Side 2:
  - live tracks: Club Arc-en-ciel, Roanne, France, August 1973
  - studio track: Manor Studio, Oxfordshire, England, June 1973
- Side 3:
  - BBC tracks: BBC Studios, England, January 1974
  - studio track: Manor Studio, Oxfordshire, England, during You sessions, Summer 1974
- Side 4: Marquee Club, England, September 1975

== Personnel ==
=== Lineup A ===
- Daevid Allen – guitar, vocals
- Gilli Smyth – space whisper
- "Bloomdido" Didier Malherbe – flutes, saxes, percussion
- Steve Hillage – guitar, vocals
- Tim Blake – synthesizer, vocals
- Mike Howlett – bass, vocals
- Pierre Moerlen – drums

=== Lineup B ===
- Daevid Allen – guitar, vocals
- "Bloomdido" Didier Malherbe – flutes, saxes, percussion
- Steve Hillage – guitar, vocals
- Tim Blake – synthesizer, vocals
- Mike Howlett – bass, vocals
- Rob Tait – drums, percussion
- Diane Stewart – vocals, percussion

=== Lineup C ===
- Steve Hillage – guitar, vocals
- Mike Howlett – bass guitar, vocals
- Didier Malherbe – sax, flute, vocals, percussion
- Miquette Giraudy – voices yonic
- Patrice Lemoine – keyboards
- Pierre Moerlen – drums, percussion
- Mireille Bauer – percussion
