= Leave It Open =

Leave It Open may refer to:

- Leave It Open, a 1981 album by the jazz rock band Pierre Moerlen's Gong
- "Leave It Open", a song by Kate Bush from her 1982 album The Dreaming
