= Expresso II =

Studio album by Gong (Note: This incarnation of the band was later named Pierre Moerlen's Gong)
- Released: 3 March 1978
- Recorded: July–August 1977
- Studios: Pye & Matrix, London
- Genre: Jazz rock
- Length: 37:17
- Label: Virgin
- Producers: Gong; John Wood

Gong chronology
Gong est Mort, Vive Gong (1977)	Expresso II (1978)	A Wingful of Eyes (1987)

Pierre Moerlen's Gong chronology
Gazeuse! (1976)	Expresso II (1978)	Downwind (1979)

Professional ratings
Review scores
Source	Rating
Allmusic	4.5/5 stars

Expresso II is the eighth studio album released under the name Gong and the de facto second album by Pierre Moerlen's Gong. It was released in March 1978.

Featuring an all-instrumental jazz-driven sound, notable for the prominent use of vibraphone. Although the album was issued by Virgin Records under the "Gong" name for contractual reasons, and the name "Pierre Moerlen's Gong" would not be adopted for a few more months, the lineup involved and the nature of the music are those of the Moerlen-led band.

This was the final Gong-related album released by Virgin; the band continued on Arista Records.

== Track listing ==
No.	Title	Writer(s)	Length
1.	"Heavy Tune"	Pierre Moerlen	6:22
2.	"Golden Dilemma"	Hansford Rowe	4:51
3.	"Sleepy"	Mireille Bauer	7:17
4.	"Soli"	Hansford Rowe	7:37
5.	"Boring"	Mireille Bauer	6:23
6.	"Three Blind Mice"	Benoît Moerlen	4:47

== Personnel ==
- Pierre Moerlen – drums, vibraphone, xylophone, glockenspiel, tympani, tubular bells
- Benoît Moerlen – vibraphone, marimba, xylophone, glockenspiel, percussion, claves, tubular bells
- Mireille Bauer – marimba, vibraphone
- Hansford Rowe – bass, rhythm guitar (2)

Additional personnel

- Mick Taylor – lead guitar (1)
- Allan Holdsworth – lead guitar (3, 4, 6), rhythm guitar (1)
- Bon Lozaga – lead guitar (2), rhythm guitar (3)
- Darryl Way – violin (3, 5)
- François Causse – congas

== In popular culture ==
The track "Heavy Tune" is featured on Fusion FM radio in the game Grand Theft Auto IV.
