= Gong (band) =

International rock band

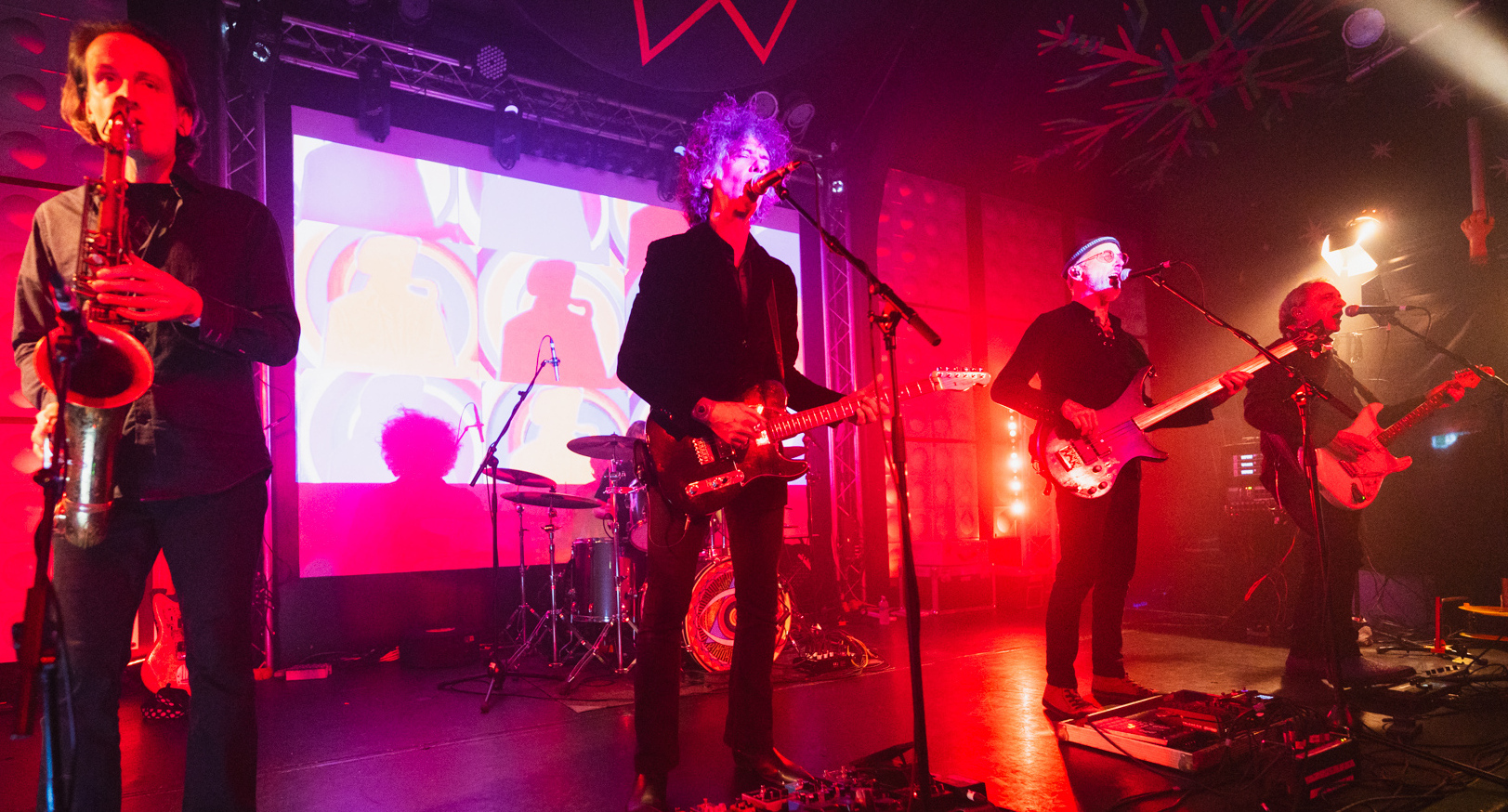
- Gong at Club 85, Hitchin in 2025; From left to right: Ian East, Kavus Torabi, Cheb Nettles (obscured), Dave Sturt and Fabio Golfetti

Background information
- Origin: Paris, France
- Genres: Canterbury scene; progressive rock; psychedelic rock; space rock; jazz rock
- Years active: 1967–1968; 1969–1978; 1990; 1992–2001; 2003–2006; 2007–present
- Labels: BYG Actuel; Philips; Virgin; Charly; Musea; Snapper; Kscope
- Spinoffs: Mother Gong; Pierre Moerlen's Gong; Planet Gong; New York Gong; Gongmaison; Strontium 90
- Members: Dave Sturt; Ian East; Fabio Golfetti; Kavus Torabi; Cheb Nettles
- Past members: Daevid Allen; Gilli Smyth; Didier Malherbe; Christian Tritsch; Rachid Houari; Pip Pyle; Laurie Allan; Charles Hayward; Tim Blake; Francis Moze; Mireille Bauer; Steve Hillage; Mike Howlett; Pierre Moerlen; Miquette Giraudy; Benoit Moerlen; Bill Bruford; Patrice Lemoine; Mino Cinelu; Allan Holdsworth; Hansford Rowe; Keith Bailey; Graham Clark; Shyamal Maitra; Chris Taylor; Theo Travis; Mark Robson; Jorge Pinchevsky; Orlando Allen
- Website: gongband.com

Gong are a rock band associated with the Canterbury scene. They incorporate elements of psychedelic rock, jazz and space rock into their musical style. The group was formed in Paris in 1967 by Australian musician Daevid Allen and English vocalist Gilli Smyth. Band members have included Didier Malherbe, Pip Pyle, Steve Hillage, Mike Howlett, Tim Blake, Pierre Moerlen, Bill Laswell and Theo Travis. Others who have played on stage with Gong include Don Cherry, Chris Cutler, Bill Bruford, Brian Davison, Dave Stewart and Tatsuya Yoshida.

Gong's 1970 debut album, Magick Brother, featured a psychedelic rock sound. By the following year, the second album, Camembert Electrique, featured the more progressive rock/space rock sound with which they would be most associated. Between 1973 and 1974, Gong released their best-known work, the allegorical Radio Gnome Invisible trilogy, consisting of Flying Teapot (1973), Angel's Egg (1973) and You (1974), which details the adventures of Zero the Hero, the Good Witch Yoni and the Pot Head Pixies from the Planet Gong.

In 1975, Allen and Smyth left the band, which continued without them, releasing the Howlett-fronted Shamal (1976) and a series of jazz rock albums under the leadership of drummer Pierre Moerlen. This incarnation soon became known as Pierre Moerlen's Gong. Meanwhile, Smyth formed Mother Gong while Allen initiated a series of spin-off groups, including Planet Gong, New York Gong and Gongmaison, before returning to lead Gong once again in 1990 until his death in 2015. With Allen's encouragement, the band decided to continue as a quintet comprising guitarist Fabio Golfetti, bassist Dave Sturt, woodwind player Ian East, guitarist and vocalist Kavus Torabi, and drummer Cheb Nettles. They released the album Rejoice! I'm Dead! in September 2016, followed by the loose trilogy of albums The Universe Also Collapses (2019), Unending Ascending (2023), and Bright Spirit (2026).

== History ==
=== Protogong (1967–1968) ===
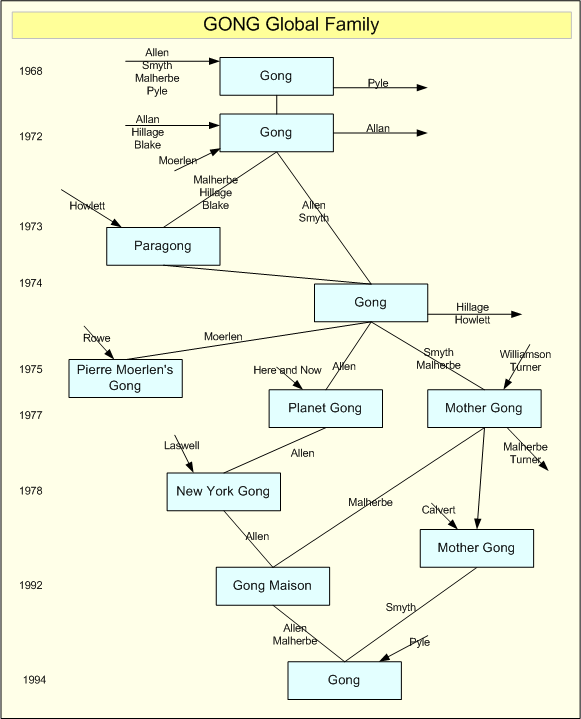
Overview of personnel changes

In September 1967, Australian singer and guitarist Daevid Allen, a member of the English psychedelic rock band Soft Machine, was denied re-entry to the United Kingdom for 3 years following a French tour because his visa had expired. He settled in Paris, where he and his partner, London-born Sorbonne professor Gilli Smyth, established the first incarnation of Gong (later referred to by Allen as "Protogong") along with Ziska Baum on vocals and Loren Standlee on flute. However, the nascent band came to an abrupt end during the May 1968 student revolution, when Allen and Smyth were forced to flee the country after a warrant was issued for their arrest. They headed for Deià in Mallorca, where they had lived for a time in 1966.

=== Gong 'proper' begins (1969–1971) ===
In August 1969, film director Jérôme Laperrousaz, a close friend of the pair, invited them back to France to record a soundtrack for a motorcycle racing movie which he was planning. This came to nothing at the time, but they were subsequently approached by Jean Karakos of the newly formed independent label BYG Actuel to record an album, and so set about forming a new electric Gong band in Paris, recruiting their first rhythm section of Christian Tritsch (bass) and Rachid Houari (drums and percussion) and re-connecting with a saxophonist called Didier Malherbe whom they had met in Deià. However, Tritsch was not ready in time for the sessions and so Allen played the bass guitar himself. The album, entitled Magick Brother, was completed in October.

The reborn Gong played its debut gig at the BYG Actuel Festival (Festival d'Amougies) in the small Belgian town of Amougies, on 27 October 1969, joined by Danny Laloux on hunting horn and percussion, and Dieter Gewissler and Gerry Fields on violin, and was introduced to the stage by bemused compere Frank Zappa. Magick Brother was released in March 1970, followed in April by a non-album single, "Est-Ce Que Je Suis; Garçon Ou Fille?" b/w "Hip Hip Hypnotise Ya", which again featured Laloux and Gewissler. In October, the band moved into an abandoned 12-room hunting lodge called Pavillon du Hay, near Voisines and Sens, 120 km south-east of Paris. They would be based there until early 1974.

Houari left the band in the spring of 1971 and was replaced by English drummer Pip Pyle, whom Allen had been introduced to by Robert Wyatt during the recording of his debut solo album, Banana Moon. The new line-up recorded a soundtrack for Laperrousaz's movie, now entitled Continental Circus, backed poet Dashiell Hedayat on his album Obsolete, and played at the second Glastonbury Festival, later documented on the Glastonbury Fayre album. Next, they began work on their second studio album, Camembert Electrique, later referred to by Allen as "the first real band album". It established the progressive, space rock sound which would make their name, leading, in the autumn, to their first UK tour. However, by the end of the year Pyle had left the group, to be replaced by another English drummer, Laurie Allan.

=== The Radio Gnome Invisible trilogy (1972–1974) ===
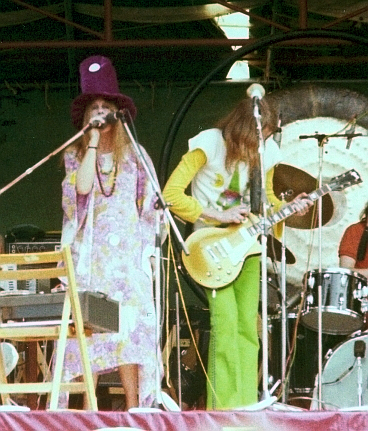
Gilli Smyth and Daevid Allen, Hyde Park, 1974

Gong went through increasing line-up disruption in 1972. Laurie Allan left in April to be replaced by Mac Poole, then Charles Hayward and then Rob Tait, before returning again late in the year. Gilli Smyth left for a time, returning to Deià, Mallorca, to look after her and Daevid Allen's baby son, and was replaced by Diane Stewart, who was the partner of Tait and the ex-wife of Graham Bond. Christian Tritsch moved to guitar and was replaced on bass by former Magma member Francis Moze, while the band's sound was expanded with the addition of synthesizer player Tim Blake in late 1972.

In October 1972, they were one of the first acts to sign to Richard Branson's fledgling Virgin Records label, and in late December, they traveled to Virgin's Manor Studio in Oxfordshire, England, to record their third album, Flying Teapot. In January 1973, towards the end of their recording sessions, they were joined by English guitarist Steve Hillage, whom they had met a few weeks earlier in France playing with Kevin Ayers. He arrived too late to contribute much to the album, but would soon become a key component in the Gong sound.

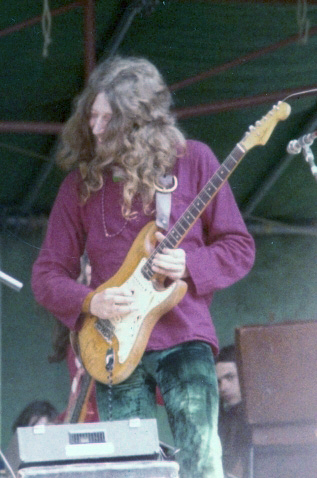
Steve Hillage, Hyde Park, 1974

In March 1973, exhausted by Gong's 1972 tour and the recording of Flying Teapot, Allen and Smyth left Gong and returned to Deià to take care of their baby Tally. Then drummer Laurie Allan and bassist Francis Moze also decided to depart. Tim Blake, Steve Hillage, Didier Malherbe, Venux De Luxe and the rest of the Gong family decided to continue as the short-lived band Paragong who enlisted drummer Pierre Moerlen and bassist Mike Howlett but existed only two short months, March and April 1973, and only ever played live in France. The only recording documenting Paragong live is the (22-minute) short album Live '73 released in 1995 which consists of the two lengthy tracks "Camembert Psilocybin Flashback" and "Porquoi Dormons Nous? (The Gnome Rock Dispensation)".

Flying Teapot was released on 25 May 1973, the same day as Tubular Bells, and was the first instalment of the Radio Gnome Invisible trilogy, which expounded upon the (previously only hinted at) Gong mythology developed by Allen. The second part, Angel's Egg, followed in December, now featuring the 'classic' rhythm section of Mike Howlett on bass and Pierre Moerlen on drums. In early 1974 Moerlen left to work with the French contemporary ensemble Les Percussions de Strasbourg and Smyth left to give birth to her and Allen's second son. They were replaced once again by Rob Tait and Diane Stewart, and the band moved from its French base at Pavillon du Hay to an English one at Middlefield Farm, near Witney, Oxfordshire. Moerlen, and later Smyth, returned in order to complete the trilogy with the album You, but by the time of its release, in October 1974, Moerlen was back with Les Percussions de Strasbourg and Smyth had settled permanently in Deià with her young sons. Prior to touring in support of You, Allen visited Smyth and the boys in Deià, while the rest of the band, including the departed Moerlen, recorded the basic tracks for Hillage's first solo album, Fish Rising. Moerlen was initially replaced in Gong by a succession of stand-ins (Chris Cutler, Laurie Allan and Bill Bruford) until former Nice and Refugee drummer Brian Davison took the job in early 1975. Smyth had already been replaced by Hillage's partner Miquette Giraudy.

In June 1974, Camembert Electrique was given a belated UK release by Virgin, priced at 59p, the price of a typical single at the time; a promotional gimmick which they had used before for Faust and would use again for a reggae compilation in 1976. These ultra-budget albums sold in large quantities because of the low price, but the pricing made them ineligible for placement on the album charts. The hope was that new fans would be encouraged to buy the groups' other albums at full price.

=== Daevid Allen's departure and Shamal (1975–1976) ===
Increasing tension and personality clashes led to Tim Blake being asked to leave in February 1975 during rehearsals for a tour. He was not replaced. Then, at a gig in Cheltenham on 10 April, the day before the release of Steve Hillage's Fish Rising album, Daevid Allen refused to go on stage, claiming that a "wall of force" was preventing him from doing so, and he left the band. The others decided to carry on without him.

In August, Pierre Moerlen was persuaded to return, replacing the unhappy and alcoholic Davison, and the band now also added Mireille Bauer on percussion, Jorge Pinchevsky on violin and Patrice Lemoine on synthesizer and, for the first time in Gong, keyboards. They toured the UK in November 1975, as documented on the 2005 release Live in Sherwood Forest '75, and worked on material for their next album, Shamal. Hillage, however, was increasingly uncomfortable without Allen, and with now being seen as the band's de facto leader. With a solo career beckoning, he and Giraudy decided to leave before Shamal was completed, participating in it only as guests. Howlett took over as lead male vocalist and Sandy Colley, Lemoine's partner and the band's cook, became his female counterpart. The album was released in February 1976 and they toured in support until a crisis was precipitated in May when Pinchevsky was refused entry to the U.K. for carrying marijuana. Ex-King Crimson violinist David Cross was tried out as a possible replacement, but before any progress could be made with this new line-up, the band split into two camps: Howlett wanted to keep vocals, but Moerlen and Bauer wanted the music to be entirely instrumental, with Malherbe undecided. Virgin Records executive Simon Draper chose Moerlen's way and Howlett left, quickly followed by Lemoine and Colley.

=== Pierre Moerlen's Gong and other '70s offshoots (1976–1980) ===
For contractual reasons, the Gong name remained in play for another two years, but the band was now effectively Pierre Moerlen's Gong, having little to do with the psychedelic space rock of Daevid Allen. Moerlen formed a new mallet-percussion-based line-up, adding his brother Benoit Moerlen, future Weather Report percussionist Mino Cinelu, journeyman guitarist Allan Holdsworth and Flying Teapot bassist Francis Moze to record the album Gazeuse! in late 1976. Malherbe, Holdsworth, Moze and Cinelu all left soon afterwards, but Moerlen kept a band going with American bassist Hansford Rowe until the late 1980s. To avoid confusion, it first became known as Gong-Expresso and then, from 1978, as Pierre Moerlen's Gong. One last album, Pentanine, was recorded in 2002 with Russian musicians before Moerlen died unexpectedly in May 2005, aged 53.

A Gong reunion event held in Paris in May 1977 brought together all of the current strands which had developed and re-asserted the primacy of the Daevid Allen-led band. It featured sets by Tim Blake, Lady June, Howlett's Strontium 90, Steve Hillage, 'Shamal Gong', Gong-Expresso, Daevid Allen and Euterpe, and was headlined by Trilogy Gong, the classic lineup of Allen, Smyth, Malherbe, Blake, Hillage, Giraudy, Howlett and Moerlen. Their performance was documented on the live album Gong est Mort, Vive Gong. Strontium 90 was Mike Howlett's short-lived band which was notable for having two bass players, and for introducing Police members Sting and Stewart Copeland to their future guitarist Andy Summers.

Daevid Allen continued to develop the Gong mythology in his solo albums and with two new bands: Planet Gong (1977), which comprised Allen and Smyth playing with the British festival band Here & Now, and New York Gong (1979), comprising Allen and the American musicians who would later become known as Material. At the same time, Gilli Smyth formed Mother Gong with English guitarist/producer Harry Williamson and Didier Malherbe, and played in Spain and England. Allen delighted in this proliferation of groups and considered his role at this time to be that of an instigator, traveling around the world leaving active Gong-related bands in his wake.

=== Gongmaison and reunion (1989–1992) ===
After spending most of the Eighties in his native Australia, Allen returned to the UK in 1988 with a new project, The Invisible Opera Company of Tibet, whose revolving cast included violinist Graham Clark and Gong saxophonist Didier Malherbe. This morphed into Gongmaison in 1989, which added Harry Williamson from Mother Gong and had a techno-influenced sound with electronic beats, as well as live percussion from Shyamal Maïtra. In 1990, the Gong name was revived for a one-off U.K. T.V. appearance with a line-up featuring Allen, Smyth and Malherbe, plus early-'70s drummer Pip Pyle and three members of Here & Now: Stephan Lewry (lead guitar), Keith Bailey (bass) and Paul Noble (synth). In April 1992, Gongmaison became Gong permanently with the combined line-up of Allen, Malherbe, Bailey and Pyle, plus Graham Clark and Shyamal Maïtra from Gongmaison. Together they recorded the album Shapeshifter (subsequently dubbed Radio Gnome Invisible, Part 4) and toured extensively.

=== 25th-anniversary celebration (1994) and worldwide touring (1996–2001) ===
In 1994, Gong celebrated its 25th birthday with a show in London which featured the return of Gilli Smyth, bassist Mike Howlett and lead guitarist Stephan Lewry of Here & Now. This formed the basis of the band which toured worldwide from 1996 to 2001, with Pierre Moerlen replacing Pip Pyle on drums from 1997 through 1999. The album Zero to Infinity was released in 2000, by which time the line-up had changed again to Allen, Smyth, Malherbe and Howlett, plus new recruits Theo Travis on sax/keys and Chris Taylor on drums. This line-up was unique in the band's history in having two sax/flute players.

=== Acid Mothers Gong (2003–2004) ===
2003 saw a radical new line-up including Acid Mothers Temple members Kawabata Makoto and Cotton Casino, plus University of Errors guitarist Josh Pollock. Allen and Smyth's son Orlando drummed on the 2004 studio album Acid Motherhood, but for the subsequent live dates the rhythm section was Ruins drummer Tatsuya Yoshida and Acid Mothers Temple bassist Tsuyama Atsushi. A live album recorded by this line-up in 2004 was released as Acid Mothers Gong Live Tokyo and they played a few more one-off shows in 2006 and 2007.

=== Gong Family Unconventions (2004–2006) ===
The European version of Gong had retired from regular touring in 2001, but there were subsequent one-off reunions, most notably at the "Gong Family Unconventions" (Uncons), the first of which was held in 2004 in the Glastonbury Assembly Rooms as a one-day event and featured many ex-members and Gong family bands including Here & Now, House of Thandoy, Thom the Poet, Invisible Opera Company, Andy Bole, Bubbledub and Joie Hinton. The 2005 Uncon was a 2-day affair featuring several Gong-related bands such as Here & Now, System 7, House of Thandoy and Kangaroo Moon. The next Uncon was a 3-day event held at the Melkweg in Amsterdam on 3–5 November 2006, with practically all Gong-related bands present: 'Classic' Gong (Allen, Smyth, Malherbe, Blake, Howlett, Travis, Taylor, plus the return of Steve Hillage and Miquette Giraudy), System 7, The Steve Hillage Band, Hadouk, Tim Blake and Jean-Philippe Rykiel, University of Errors, Here & Now, Mother Gong, Zorch, Eat Static, Sacred Geometry Band, Acid Mothers Gong and many others. These events have all been compèred by Thom the Poet (now "Thom Moon 10").

=== Gong Global Family (2007) ===
In November 2007, Daevid Allen held a series of concerts in Brazil with a new band which he called Gong Global Family. This consisted of Allen on vocals and guitar, Josh Pollock on guitar, Fabio Golfetti (of Violeta de Outono) on guitar, Gabriel Costa (also from Violeta de Outono) on bass, Marcelo Ringel on flute and tenor saxophone, and Fred Barley on drums. He also performed with his other band, University of Errors (Allen, Pollock, Barley and Michael Clare). These shows took place in São Paulo on 21 and 22 November and São Carlos on 24 November. The 21 November show was filmed and released in the UK on DVD and CD by Voiceprint Records. These musicians, minus Marcelo, also recorded some new songs at Mosh studio, São Paulo.

=== Continuing to record, tour and evolve (2008–2014) ===
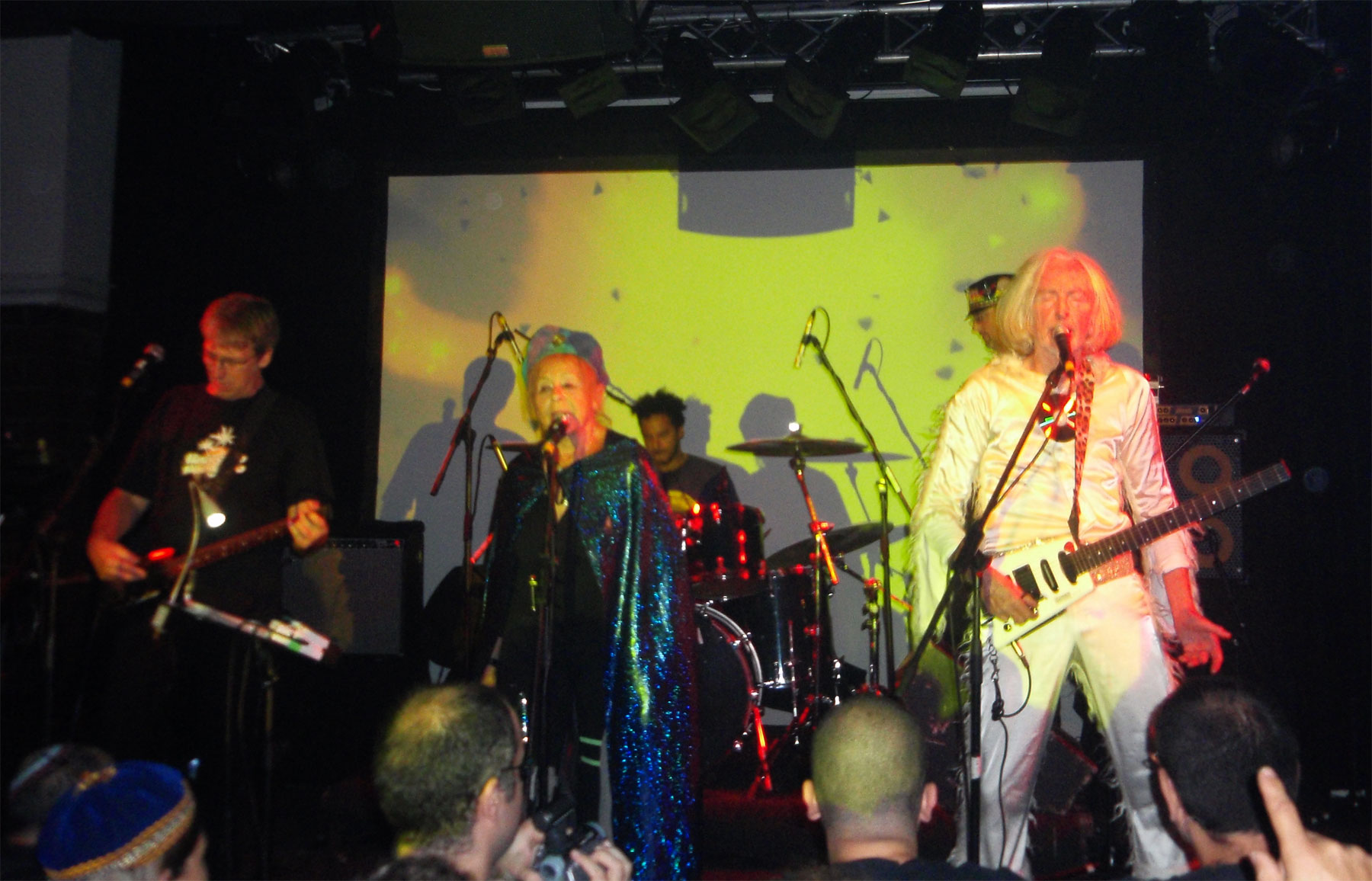
Gong live in Tel Aviv, 31 October 2009 (left to right) Steve Hillage, Gilli Smyth, Chris Taylor, Dave Sturt, Daevid Allen

In June 2008, Gong played two concerts in London, at Queen Elizabeth Hall on the South Bank (opening Massive Attack's Meltdown festival) and at The Forum, with a line-up of Allen, Smyth, Hillage, Giraudy, Howlett, Taylor and Travis. This line-up then released a new album, 2032, in 2009 and toured in support, including the Glade stage at Glastonbury Festival. They played at The Big Chill festival in the UK on 9 August 2009 with Allen, Smyth, Hillage, Giraudy, Travis, Taylor and new bassist Dave Sturt, as well as the Beautiful Days festival in Devon and the Lounge On The Farm festival near Canterbury.

Gong played four UK live shows in September 2010 with Allen, Smyth, Hillage, Giraudy, Sturt, Taylor and new wind player Ian East. Support for these shows was provided by Nik Turner's Space Ritual.

Gong toured Europe in the fall of 2012 with the line-up of Allen, Smyth, Sturt and East, plus Orlando Allen (Acid Mothers Gong) on drums, and Fabio Golfetti (Gong Global Family) on guitar. It would be Gilli Smyth's final tour with the band.

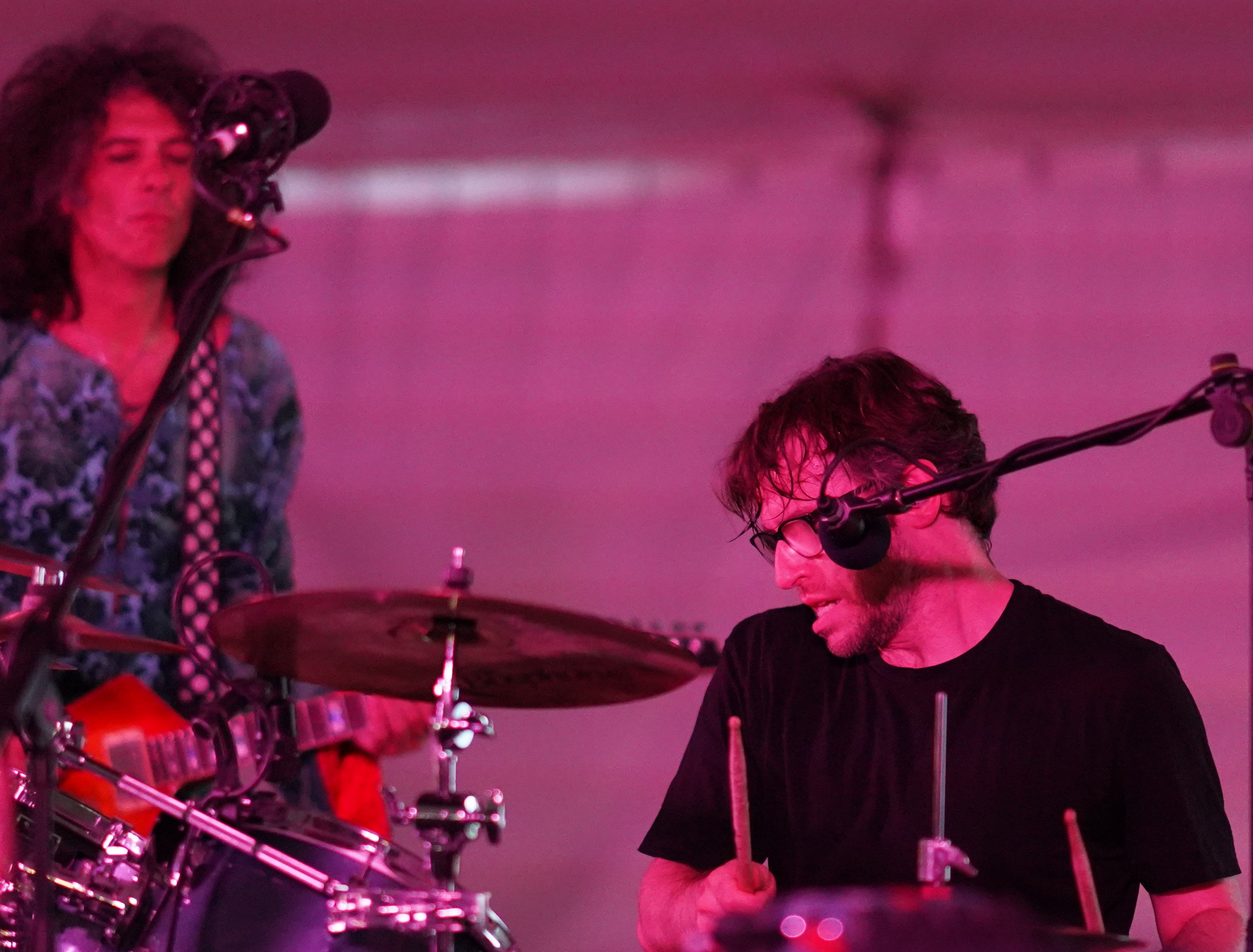
Kavus Torabi and Cheb Nettles both joined the band in 2014.

They played in Brazil in May 2013 and again in 2014, this time with the addition of Kavus Torabi on guitar.

The 2014 line-up released a new studio album entitled I See You on 10 November, with Gilli Smyth guesting. However, Daevid Allen had been diagnosed with a cancerous cyst in his neck and had to undergo radiation therapy followed by an extensive period of recuperation. The I See You tour went ahead without him, and the line-up of Sturt, East, Golfetti, Torabi and a "mystery drummer" (revealed to be Cheb Nettles) played five dates in France and two in the UK.

=== The deaths of Daevid Allen and Gilli Smyth (2015–2016) ===
On 5 February 2015, Daevid Allen released a statement announcing that the cancer had returned to his neck and had also spread to his lungs, and that he was "not interested in endless surgical operations", leaving him with "approximately six months to live". Just over a month after the initial announcement, on 13 March 2015, Daevid's son Orlando announced through Facebook that Allen had died in Byron Bay, Australia, aged 77.

On 11 April 2015, it was revealed that Allen had written an email to the band prior to his death, expressing his wish that the five remaining members continue performing following his passing and suggesting that Kavus Torabi become the new frontman of the band.

Gilli Smyth died on 22 August 2016, aged 83. She had been admitted to hospital in Byron Bay with pneumonia a couple of days previously.

=== Post-Daevid Allen: Rejoice! I'm Dead!, The Universe Also Collapses, Unending Ascending (2016–present) ===
On 5 July 2016, it was announced that the band line-up consisting of Kavus Torabi, Fabio Golfetti, Dave Sturt, Ian East and Cheb Nettles had recorded a new album entitled Rejoice! I'm Dead!, featuring guest appearances from Steve Hillage on guitar, Didier Malherbe on duduk and Graham Clark on violin, with Daevid Allen's vocals appearing on two tracks. Rejoice! I'm Dead! was released on 16 September 2016 through Snapper Music.

On 10 May 2019, the lineup followed up with the album The Universe Also Collapses.

In August 2019, Universal Music announced the boxed set, Love from The Planet Gong: The Virgin Years 1973–75, encompassing Gong's tenure with Virgin Records, would be released on 27 September. Curated by Hillage, it contains remasters of four studio albums and previously unreleased live recordings made between 1973 and 1975.

On 31 August 2023, Gong announced they would be releasing their latest album, Unending Ascending, on 3 November 2023 through Kscope. They also premiered the video for their new single "Tiny Galaxies". A second single, "All Clocks Reset", was released on 5 October.

== Music and lyrics ==
=== Style and influences ===
Gong was associated with the Canterbury scene of progressive rock bands. Their music fuses many influences into a distinctive style which has been variously described by critics and journalists as experimental rock, jazz fusion, jazz rock, progressive rock, psychedelic rock and space rock.

Rolling Stone described Gong's music as combining "psychedelic English whimsy, German kosmische space jams and Gallic libertine fusion."

Daevid Allen's guitar playing was influenced by Syd Barrett.

=== Mythology ===
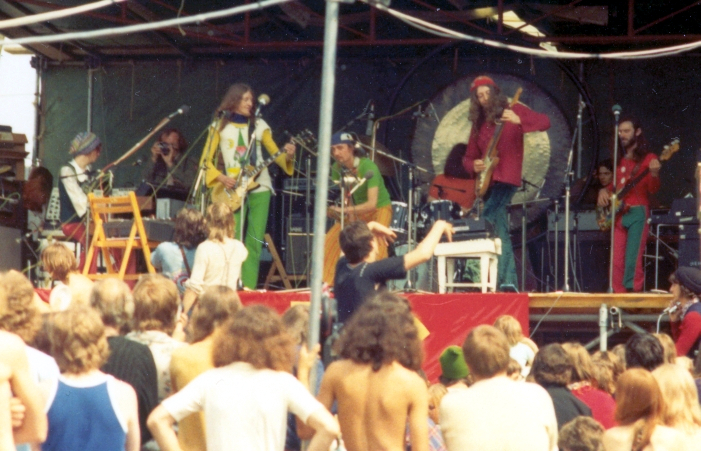
Gong playing Hyde Park, 29 June 1974

The Gong mythology is a humorous collection of recurring characters and allegorical themes which permeate the albums of Gong and Daevid Allen, and to a lesser extent the early works of Steve Hillage. The characters were often based on, or used as pseudonyms for, band members, while the story itself was based on a vision which Allen had during the full moon of Easter 1966, in Deià, Majorca, in which he claimed he could see his future laid out before him. This mythology was hinted at through Gong's earlier albums but was not the central theme until the Radio Gnome Invisible trilogy of 1973/74. It contains many similarities to concepts from Buddhist philosophy, e.g. optimism, the search for self, the denial of absolute reality and the search for the path to enlightenment. There are frequent references to the production and consumption of "tea", perhaps suggesting mushroom tea, although the word has also long been used to describe cannabis, especially in the 1940s and 1950s. The mentioning of flying teapots was inspired by [Bertrand] Russell's teapot.

=== Influence on other artists ===
Gong's influence has been seen in artists such as Ozric Tentacles and Insane Clown Posse, whose member Violent J listened to Gong's music for inspiration during the recording of ICP's 2009 album Bang! Pow! Boom!. Gong's music has also found fandom in the ambient music scene.

The Southern rock band Raging Slab has covered Gong's "The Pot Head Pixies" for NORML's Hempilation release. Japanese psych-rock band Acid Mothers Temple frequently covers Gong's "Master Builder", titled as "Om Riff", and have released 2 full albums dedicated to album-length renditions of the song; 2005's "IAO Chant From The Cosmic Inferno" and 2012's "IAO Chant From The Melting Paraiso Underground Freak Out".

Actor Sherman Hemsley, best known for his role on The Jeffersons, was an avowed Gong fanatic, going so far as to have a Flying Teapot room in his house. The room, which had darkened windows, played Flying Teapot continuously via tape loops.

== Personnel ==
Current members

- Dave Sturt – bass, vocals (2009–present)
- Ian East – saxophone, flute (2010–present)
- Fabio Golfetti – lead guitar, vocals (2012–present)
- Kavus Torabi – vocals, guitar (2014–present)
- Cheb Nettles – drums, vocals (2014–present)
Gong performing at Lavenham Summer Theatre on 10th August 2022

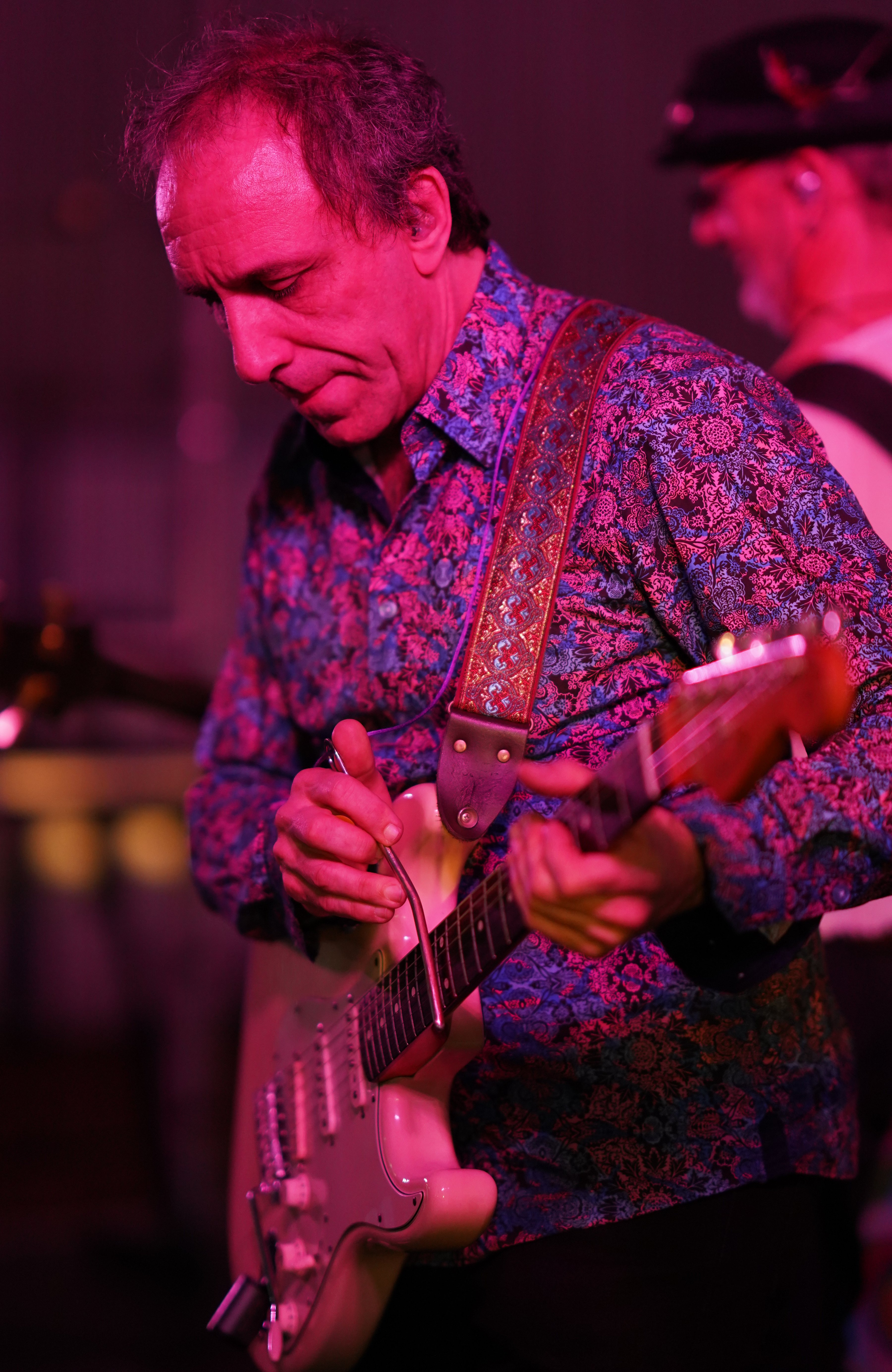
Golfetti

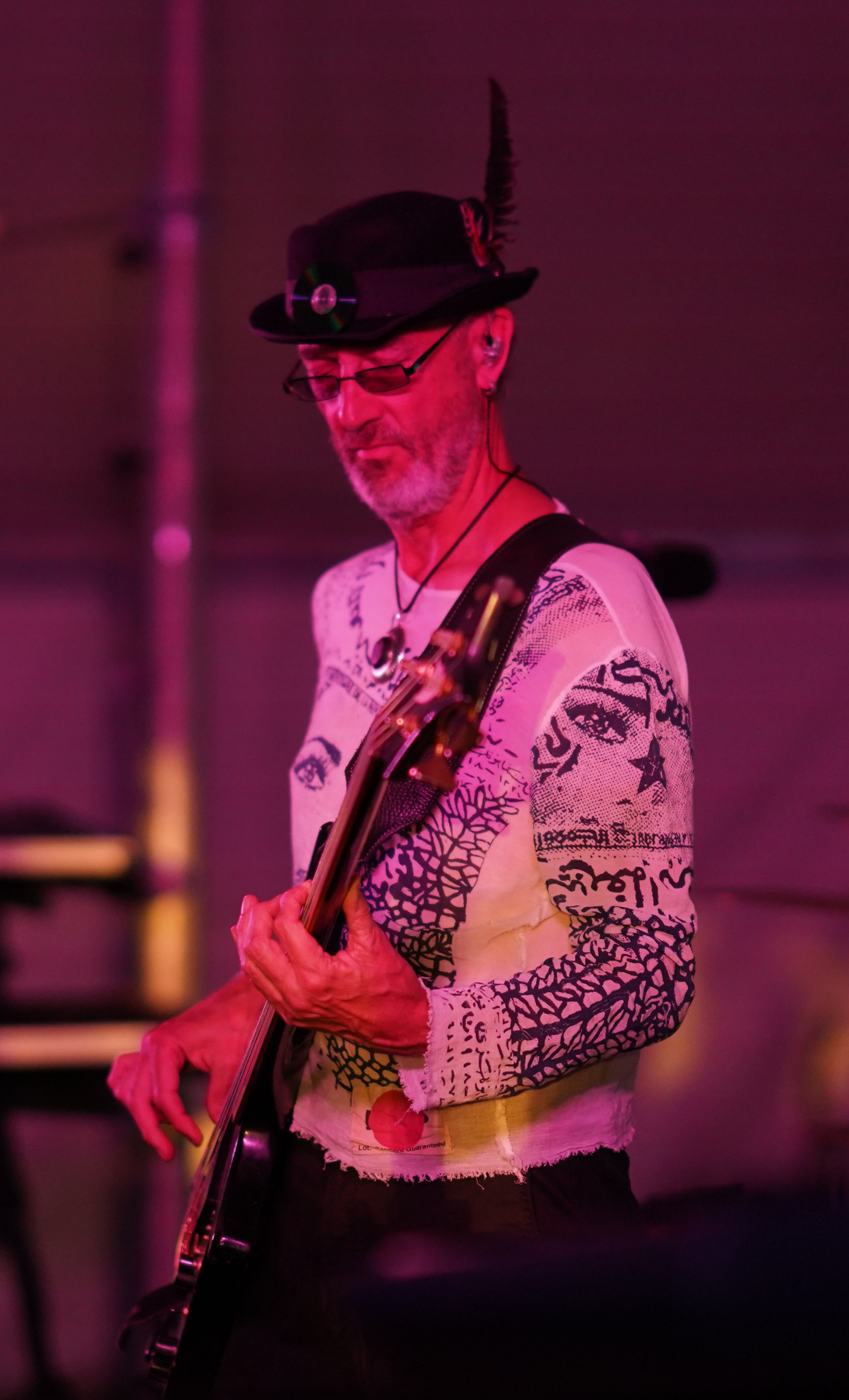
Sturt

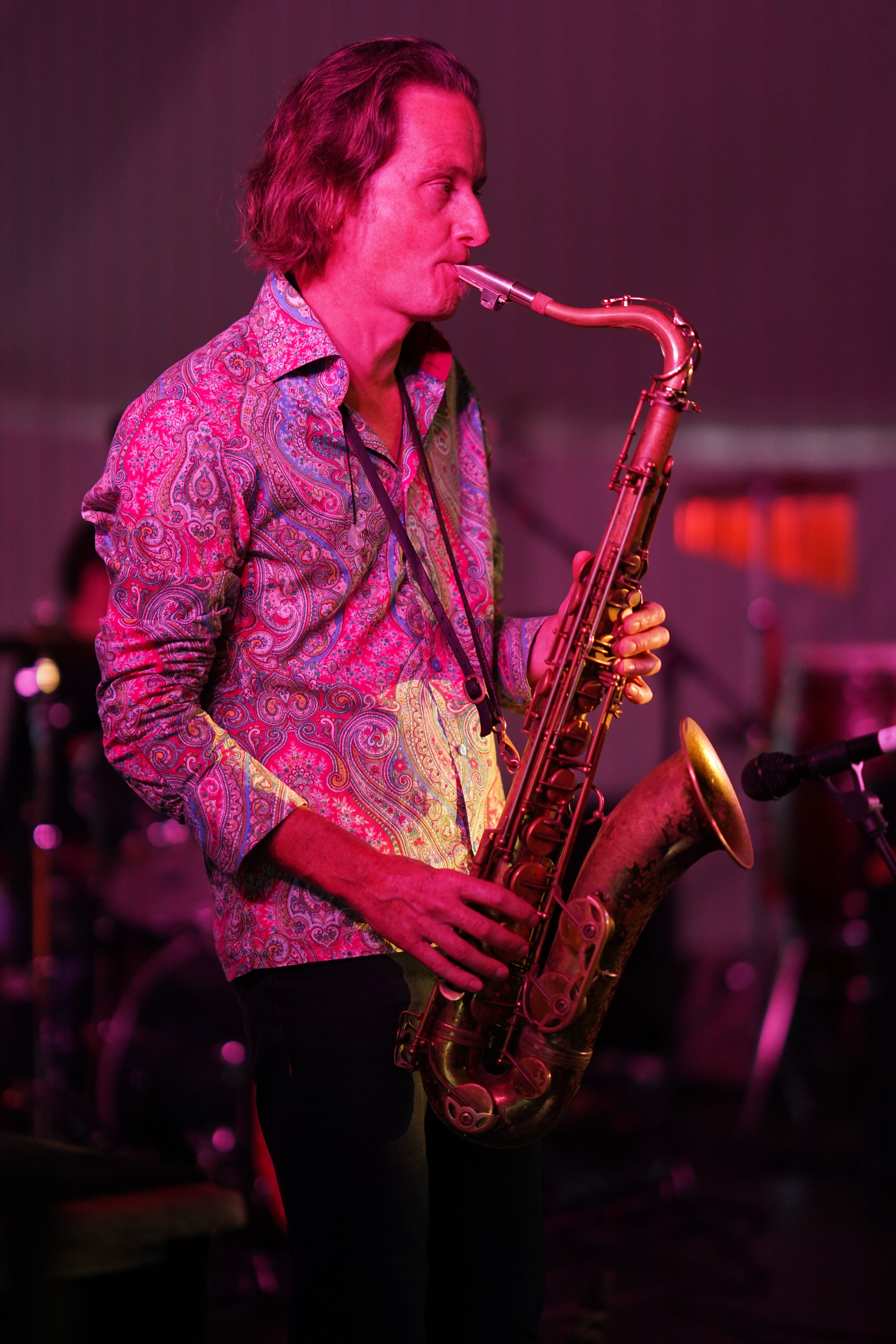
East

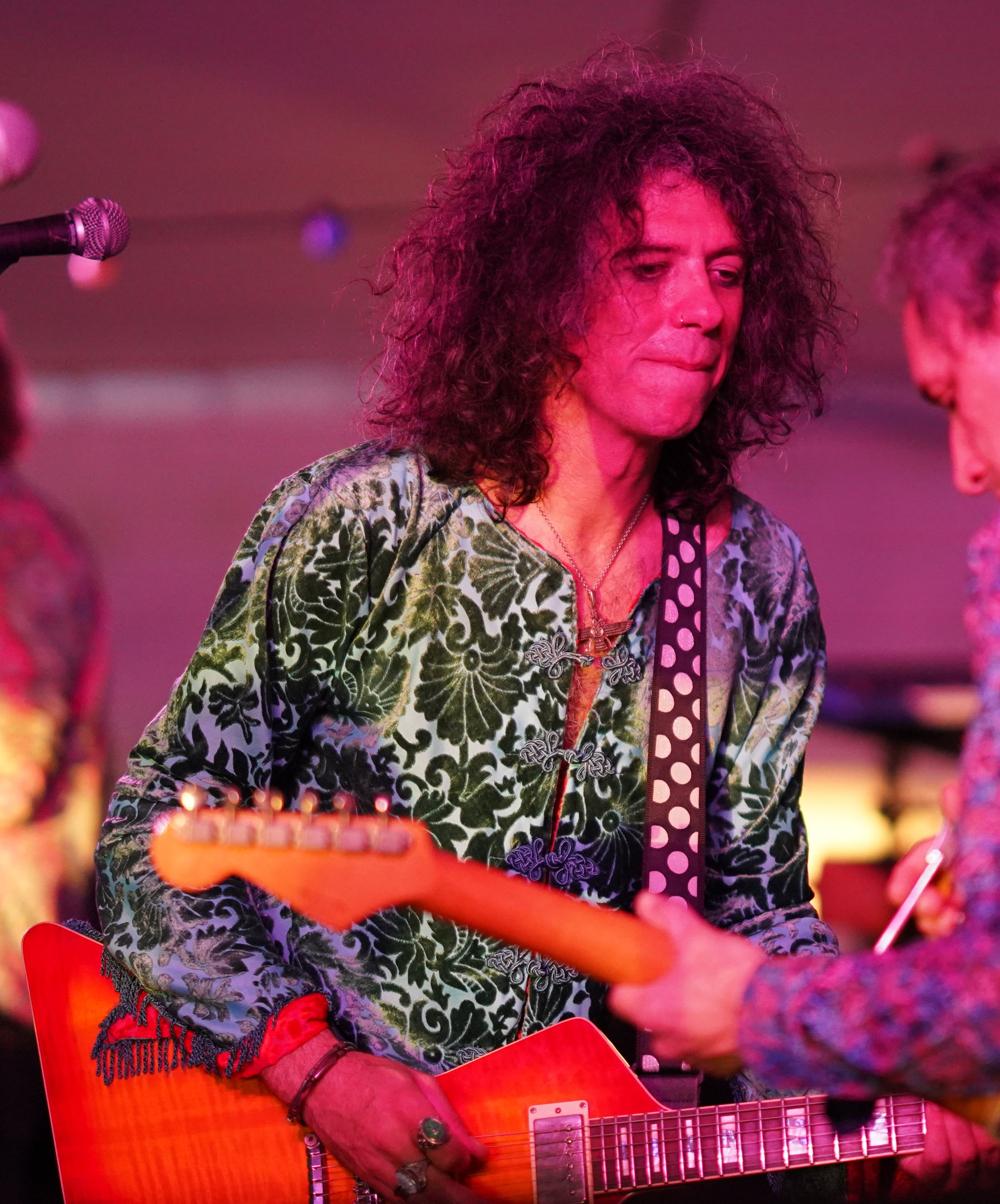
Torabi

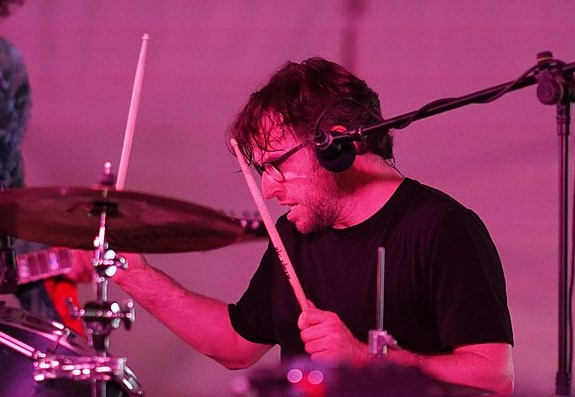
Nettles

== Discography ==
- Magick Brother (1970)
- Banana Moon (1971)
- Camembert Electrique (1971)
- Flying Teapot (1973)
- Angel's Egg (1973)
- You (1974)
- Shamal (1976)
- Gazeuse! (1976) (Expresso in North America)
- Expresso II (1978)
- Shapeshifter (1992)
- Zero to Infinity (2000)
- Acid Motherhood (2004) (with Acid Mothers Temple)
- 2032 (2009)
- I See You (2014)
- Rejoice! I'm Dead! (2016)
- The Universe Also Collapses (2019)
- Unending Ascending (2023)
- Bright Spirit (2026)

=== Paragong ===
- 1995: Live '73 (live album recorded in Spring 1973 in France)

=== Gongzilla ===
- Suffer (1995)
- Thrive (1996)
- East Village Sessions (2003)
- Five Even (2008)

=== Gong Expresso ===
- Decadence (2018)

=== Planet Gong ===
- Live Floating Anarchy 1977 (1978)

=== New York Gong ===
- About Time (1980)

=== Gongmaison ===
- Gongmaison (1989)

=== Mother Gong ===
- Fairy Tales (1979)
- Mother Gong / Anthony Phillips – Battle of the Birds (1981)
- Robot Woman (1981)
- Robot Woman 2 (1982)
- Robot Woman 3 (1986)
- Fish in the Sky (1988)
- The Owl and the Tree (with Daevid Allen) (1989)
- Wild Child (1991)
- She Made the World Magenta (1993)
- Eye (1994)
- Tree in Fish (1994)

=== Gilli Smyth, Daevid Allen and Orlando Allen ===
- I Am Your Egg (2005)

=== Soundtrack ===
- Continental Circus (1972)

=== Live albums ===
- Glastonbury Fayre (Gong contributed one side to this triple LP) (1971)
- Greasy Truckers Live at Dingwalls Dance Hall (contributed one side) (1973)
- Gong Live Etc (UK live album) (1977)
- Gong est Mort, Vive Gong (French live album) (1977)
- Pierre Moerlen's Gong Live (Pierre Moerlen's Gong) (1980)
- Haunted Chateau (1990, rec. 1969–1970)
- Live at Sheffield '74 (1990)
- Live au Bataclan 1973 (1990)
- Live Floating Anarchy 1991 (Planet Gong) (1992)
- Live 1991 (Mother Gong) (1992)
- Live on T.V. 1990 (1993)
- 25th Birthday Party (1995)
- Pre-Modernist Wireless: The Peel Sessions (1995)
- Full Circle Live '88 (Pierre Moerlen's Gong) (1998)
- Live 2 Infinitea (2000)
- OK Friends (2002)
- Glastonbury 1971 (2002)
- Live in Sherwood Forest '75 (Shamal-Gong) (2005)
- Glastonbury '79–'81 (Mother Gong) (2005)
- Gong in the 70s (2006)
- Acid Mothers Gong Live Tokyo (Acid Mothers Gong) (2006)
- Mothergong O Amsterdam (Mother Gong) (2007)
- Live in Brazil (2009)
- Pulsing Signals (2022)

=== Video albums ===
- High Above The Subterania Club 2000 (2002)
- Gong @ Montserrat 1973 And Other Stories (2007)
- Live At The Gong Family Unconventional Gathering, The Melkweg, Amsterdam (2008)
- Gong On French TV 1971 - 1973 (2011)
- Gong Live At The Fridge, Brixton, May 1991 (1992)

=== Compilation albums ===
- Wingful of Eyes (A Retrospective, '75–'78) (Virgin Records, 1986)
- The Mystery and the History of the Planet Gong (1989)
- The Best of Gong (Charly Records, 1995)
- The Very Best of Gong (Charly, 1997)
- Best of Mother Gong (1998)
- The World of Daevid Allen and Gong (3 CD compilation including almost all of the Radio Gnome Invisible trilogy and early album tracks) (2003)
- The Very Best of Gong (Charly, 2005)
- Gong in the 70's (Voiceprint, 2006)
- A Storm in a Teapot (Charly, 2013)
- Radio Gnome Invisible Trilogy (4 CD or 5-LP box set) (Charly, 2015)
- Love from the Planet Gong: The Virgin Years (1973–75) (Virgin, 2019)

=== Other appearances ===
- Obsolete (album by French singer Dashiell Hedayat) (1971)
- The Book of AM (produced by Daevid Allen, with Mother Gong musicians) (1978)

== Filmography ==
- 2015: Romantic Warriors III: Canterbury Tales (DVD)
