= Time Is the Key =

Time is the Key

Studio album by Pierre Moerlen's Gong
- Released: Late 1979
- Recorded: Konk studios, August 1979
- Genres: Jazz rock, progressive rock
- Length: 43:39
- Label: Arista
- Producer: Pierre Moerlen

Pierre Moerlen's Gong chronology
Downwind (1979)	Time is the Key (1979)	Leave It Open (1981)

Professional ratings
Review scores
Source	Rating
Allmusic	2.5/5.0 stars

Time is the Key is the fourth album by the band Pierre Moerlen's Gong. It was released in late 1979 by Arista Records.

The album is notable for the prominent use of vibraphone, and features the English jazz keyboard player Peter Lemer on most tracks, their only album to do so, and Allmusic notes that there is also a progressive rock influence on the album, particularly on the first two tracks.

== Track listing ==
All tracks are written by Pierre Moerlen, except where noted.

No.	Title	Length
1.	"Ard Na Greine" (Irish for "Height of the Sun")	6:10
2.	"Earthrise"	2:25
3.	"Supermarket"	3:35
4.	"Faerie Steps"	5:33
5.	"An American in England" (Hansford Rowe)	2:57
6.	"The Organ Grinder"	3:56
7.	"Sugar Street"	2:22
8.	"The Bender"	3:16
9.	"Arabesque Intro & Arabesque"	5:18
10.	"Esnuria Two"	5:34
11.	"Time is the Key"	2:29

== Personnel ==
Pierre Moerlen's Gong

- Pierre Moerlen – drums, vibraphone, gong, electravibe, marimba, glockenspiel, tympani, darbuka, synthesizers (7, 8)
- Hansford Rowe – bass (3−11), acoustic guitar (5), bass synthesizer (11)
- Bon Lozaga – guitar (3−11)

Former Pierre Moerlen's Gong

- Allan Holdsworth – lead guitar (9−11)

Additional personnel

- Darryl Way – violin (1)
- Joe Kirby – double bass (1, 2)
- Peter Lemer – keyboards (3−11), Polymoog (6−10)
- Nico Ramsden – lead and rhythm guitar (8)

Produced by Pierre Moerlen

=== Production credits ===
- Engineering – John Rollo
- Mastering – Ray Staff at Trident
- Photography – Jay Myrdal and Sheila Rock
- Sleeve layout and design – Steve Ridgeway and Julie Harris
- Additional engineer – Brian Risner
- Studio co-ordination – Brian Risner
