= Pierre Moerlen =

French drummer (1952–2005)

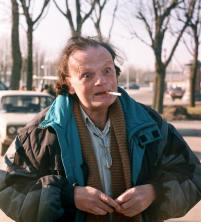

Background information
- Also known as: Pierre de Strasbourg
- Born: 23 October 1952; Colmar, Haut-Rhin, France
- Died: 3 May 2005 (aged 52)
- Genres: Progressive rock; Jazz; Jazz fusion
- Occupation: Musician
- Instruments: Drums; percussion
- Formerly of: Gong

Pierre Moerlen (23 October 1952, Colmar, Haut-Rhin – 3 May 2005, Sainte-Marie-aux-Mines, near Strasbourg) was a French drummer and percussionist, best known for his work with Gong and Mike Oldfield and as Pierre Moerlen's Gong.

== Biography ==
Pierre Moerlen was born in Colmar (Haut-Rhin) on 23 October 1952, third of five children. His father was an organist and his mother was a music teacher. All five siblings learned music with their parents and all became musicians. Pierre's younger brother, Benoît Moerlen, is also a percussionist (he also worked with Gong and Mike Oldfield).

Pierre left Colmar for Strasbourg to learn percussion with Jean Batigne, founder of Les Percussions de Strasbourg. He was also a member of two rock and rock-jazz bands, including Hasm Congélateur (with included future Magma guitarist Gabriel Federow), whose most notable performance was the opening slot at the Seloncourt Festival in September 1972, headlined by Ange, Genesis and Robert Wyatt's Matching Mole.

In January 1973, Moerlen joined Daevid Allen's Gong, debuting on the Angel's Egg (1973) album. In June 1973 he was asked by Virgin Records's boss Richard Branson to play percussion with Mike Oldfield for the premiere of Tubular Bells (1973), to replace the incapacitated Robert Wyatt. Steve Hillage, guitar player of Gong, also took part. Between 1975-87, beginning with Ommadawn (1975), Moerlen would be Oldfield's percussionist of choice for his albums and his tours.

Moerlen left and returned to Gong several times to tour with Les Percussions de Strasbourg (he created with them Musik im Bauch by Karlheinz Stockhausen and Hiérophonie V by Yoshihisa Taïra at Festival international d'art contemporain de Royan, 1975), and although he recorded You (1974) he left just before the tour promoting that album began.

In the summer of 1975, by which time band founder, Daevid Allen, had left, he was asked to return to co-lead the band with Didier Malherbe and Steve Hillage, who himself left shortly thereafter, only appearing on a couple of tracks on the next album Shamal (1976). Another series of line-up changes resulted in the Gazeuse! (1976) album (released as Expresso in the US) with Allan Holdsworth on guitar, following which Malherbe left, leaving Moerlen as the only link with the "classic" Gong line-up. He retained the name for the next album, Expresso II (1978), but to avoid confusion the band's concerts were often announced as Gong-Expresso. Since this wasn't clear enough, the name Pierre Moerlen's Gong (PMG) was used from 1978 onwards.

At this point the band – which included American musicians Bon Lozaga (guitar) and Hansford Rowe (bass) – were playing jazz fusion rather than the Canterbury scene-influenced psychedelia of old. In 1978, PMG were released from the Virgin contract, and signed with Arista, releasing Downwind (1979), Time is the Key (1979), Pierre Moerlen's Gong Live (1980) and Leave It Open (1980). During this period, Moerlen regularly toured internationally with Mike Oldfield.

PMG ceased operations in 1981 following tours of North America and Europe in late 1980. Later that year, Moerlen briefly joined Magma as second drummer. Following Mike Oldfield's 10th Anniversary tour in 1983, he joined the Swedish progressive/symphonic band Tribute (1985–87).

PMG reformed for two albums and tours in the late 1980s. After spending several years as orchestra pit musician for various musicals, he returned to active service in 1997 when he joined the British jazz-rock outfit Brand X for international touring in 1997. Later that year, he was asked to rejoin Gong, and toured with the band until 1999. He then concentrated on putting together a new PMG line-up and repertoire, which resulted in the studio album Pentanine (2004), recorded in Moscow in 2002.

== Death ==
Pierre Moerlen died unexpectedly in his sleep of natural causes on 3 May 2005, aged 52. At the time of his death he was rehearsing with a new incarnation of Pierre Moerlen's Gong.

== Discography ==
=== With Gong ===
- 1973: Angel's Egg (Radio Gnome trilogy, part 2)
- 1974: You (Radio Gnome trilogy, part 3)
- 1976: Shamal
- 1977: Gong est Mort, Vive Gong (French live album)
- 1977: Gong Live Etc (UK live album)

=== With Paragong ===
- 1995: Live '73 (live album recorded in Spring 1973 in France)

=== With Pierre Moerlen's Gong ===
- 1976: Gazeuse! (Expresso in North America) (issued as a "Gong" album)
- 1978: Expresso II (issued as a "Gong" album)
- 1979: Downwind
- 1979: Time is the Key
- 1980: Pierre Moerlen's Gong Live
- 1981: Leave It Open
- 1986: Breakthrough
- 1988: Second Wind
- 1998: Full Circle Live '88
- 2004: Pentanine
- 2010: Tribute (posthumous with Moerlen's last compositions, last incarnation of the band)

=== With Mike Oldfield ===
- 1975: Ommadawn
- 1978: Incantations
- 1979: Exposed
- 1979: Platinum
- 1983: Crises
- 1985: The Complete Mike Oldfield
- 1987: Islands

In November 1973, Moerlen participated in a live-in-the-studio performance of Mike Oldfield's Tubular Bells for the BBC. It is available on Oldfield's Elements DVD.

=== With others ===
- 1975: Steve Hillage – Fish Rising
- 1975: Slapp Happy – Desperate Straights
- 1977: Pekka Pohjola – Mathematician's Air Display
- 1979: Mick Taylor – Mick Taylor
- 1980: Sally Oldfield – Celebration
- 1982: Philip Lynott – The Philip Lynott Album
- 1983: Sally Oldfield – Strange Day in Berlin
- 1983: Jean-Yves Lievaux – Transformances
- 1985: Tribute – Breaking Barriers
- 1988: Biréli Lagrène – Inferno
- 1995: Project Lo – Dabblings in the Darkness
