= Shamal (album) =

Studio album by Gong
- Released: 13 February 1976
- Recorded: December 1975
- Studio: Basing Street Studios; Olympic Studios; Sarm Studios (mixing)
- Genre: Progressive rock; jazz fusion
- Length: 40:41
- Label: Virgin Records
- Producer: Nick Mason

Gong chronology
You (1974)	Shamal (1976)	Gazeuse! (1976)

Professional ratings
Review scores
Source	Rating
Allmusic	3/5 stars
Christgau's Record Guide	B−

Shamal is the sixth studio album released under the name Gong and was released by Virgin Records on 13 February 1976 The album, produced by Pink Floyd drummer Nick Mason, was recorded in December 1975 by a unique line-up referred to later as "Shamal-Gong". It is usually regarded as a transitional album between Daevid Allen's incarnation of the band and the Pierre Moerlen-led fusion line-up of the late 1970s.

== Track listing ==
Side one
No.	Title	Writer(s)	Length
1.	"Wingful of Eyes"	Mike Howlett	6:20
2.	"Chandra"	Lemoine, Howlett	7:18
3.	"Bambooji"	Didier Malherbe	5:13

Side two
No.	Title	Writer(s)	Length
4.	"Cat in Clark's Shoes"	Malherbe, Howlett, Lemoine	7:43
5.	"Mandrake"	Pierre Moerlen	5:04
6.	"Shamal"	Howlett, Malherbe, Moerlen, Lemoine, Mireille Bauer	9:03
Total length:			40:41

In 2018, a 2-CD remastered edition of the album was issued by UMC containing one CD of live material recorded in 1975, and unreleased bonus tracks to the regular album.

== Personnel ==
"Wingful of Eyes"
Wingful of Eyes sample

=== Personnel ===
Gong

- Mike Howlett – bass guitar, vocals
- Didier Malherbe – tenor sax, soprano sax, flute, bansuri, gongs
- Mireille Bauer – marimba, glockenspiel, xylophone, percussion, gongs
- Pierre Moerlen – drums, vibraphone, tubular bells
- Patrice Lemoine – organ, piano, synthesizer

Former Gong

- Steve Hillage – acoustic guitar, electric guitar ("Bambooji" and "Wingful of Eyes")
- Miquette Giraudy – vocals ("Bambooji")

Guest musicians

- Jorge Pinchevsky – violin ("Chandra", "Bambooji", "Cat In Clark's Shoes", "Shamal"), voice ("Cat In Clark's Shoes")
- Sandy Colley – vocals ("Shamal")

=== Production ===
- Nick Mason: producer
- Clive Arrowsmith: artwork, photography
- Phil Ault: engineer
- Dave Hutchins: engineer
- Ben Tavera King: engineer
- Rick Curtain: engineer
- Ben King: engineer
