= Gazeuse! =

Studio album by Gong (Note: This incarnation of the band was later named Pierre Moerlen's Gong)
- Released: Late 1976
- Recorded: September 1976; The Manor Studio
- Genre: Jazz rock
- Length: 39:46
- Label: Virgin
- Producer: Dennis MacKay

Gong chronology
Shamal (1976)	Gazeuse! (1976)	Gong Live Etc. (1977)

Professional ratings
Review scores
Source	Rating
Allmusic	4.5/5 stars

Gazeuse! (French for 'Sparkling!', 'Fizzy!' or 'Effervescent!') is the seventh album released under the name Gong and the de facto debut album by Pierre Moerlen's Gong. It was released in late 1976. The title was changed to Expresso for the U.S. release.

The album features an all-instrumental jazz-driven sound, notable for the prominent use of vibraphone. Although the album was issued by Virgin Records under the "Gong" name for contractual reasons, and the name "Pierre Moerlen's Gong" would not be adopted for a couple of years, the lineup involved and the nature of the music are that of the Moerlen-led band.

Writing credits are split between Moerlen and guitarist Allan Holdsworth, except for the final track, which is by early Magma and Flying Teapot bassist Francis Moze.

The cover art is done by Jacques Moitoret.

== Track listing ==
Side one

1. "Expresso" (Pierre Moerlen) – 5:58
2. "Night Illusion" (Allan Holdsworth) – 3:42
3. "Percolations (Part I & II)" (Moerlen) – 10:00

Side two

4. "Shadows Of" (Holdsworth) – 7:48
5. "Esnuria" (Moerlen) – 8:00
6. "Mireille" (Francis Moze) – 4:10

"Shadows Of" is a reworking of Allan Holdsworth's "Velvet Darkness" from his 1976 album of the same name.

== Personnel ==
- Pierre Moerlen – drums, vibraphone, marimba, timpani, glockenspiel
- Didier Malherbe – tenor sax (1,5), flute (4)
- Allan Holdsworth – guitars, violin, pedal steel
- Mireille Bauer – vibraphone, marimba, glockenspiel, toms
- Benoît Moerlen – vibraphone
- Francis Moze – fretless bass, gong, piano
- Mino Cinelu – percussion

== Production ==
- Produced by Dennis MacKay
- Engineered by Stephen W Tayler
