= Les Percussions de Strasbourg =

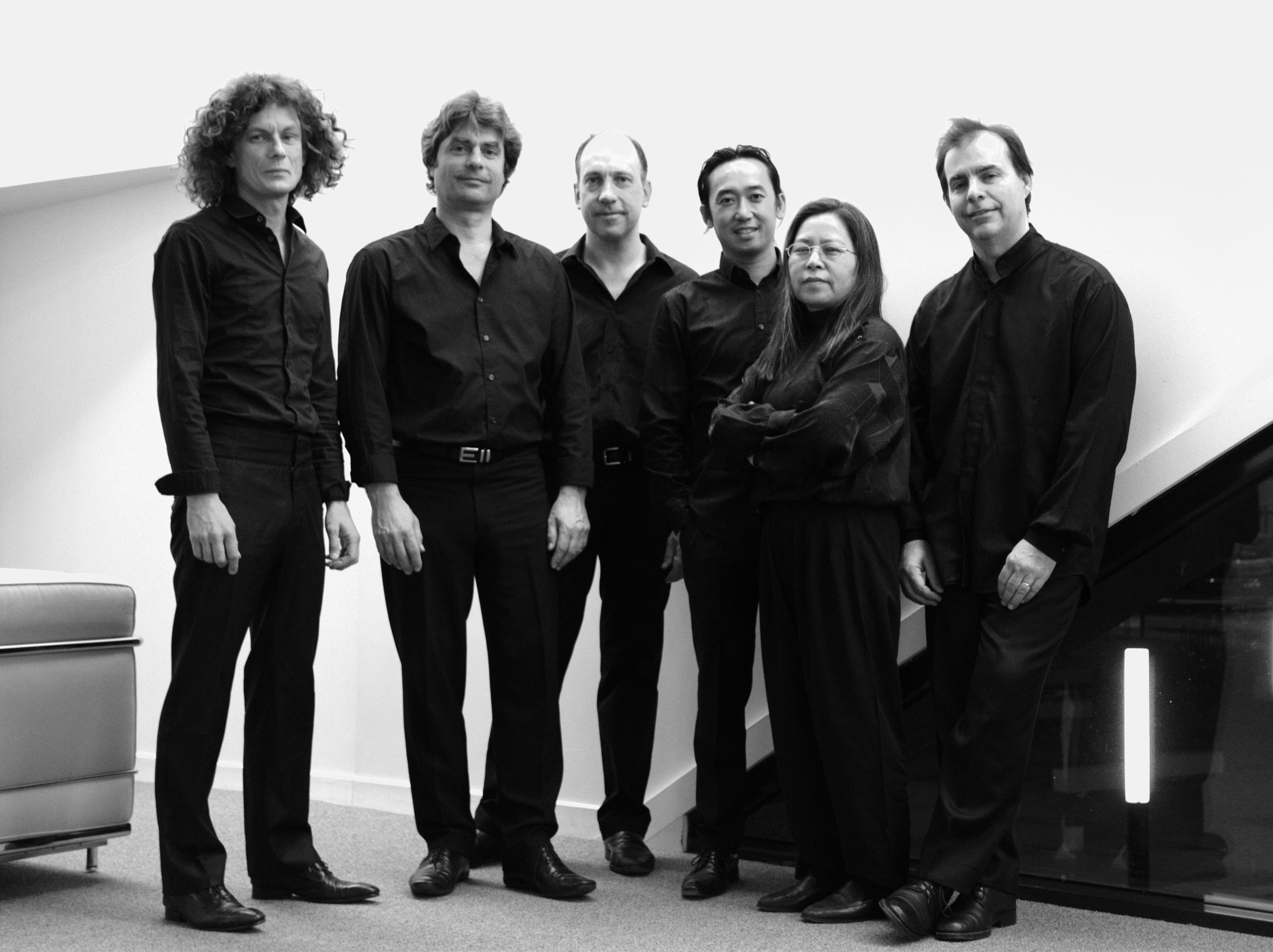
Les Percussions de Strasbourg, April 2013

Les Percussions de Strasbourg is a French contemporary classical music percussion ensemble made up of six percussionists. Founded in 1962, the ensemble is still performing and commissioning music. The current lineup has played together for 15 years. Their discography includes two albums for Limelight Records. They have premiered over 250 works of contemporary classical music, including Iannis Xenakis's Pléïades, Inventions by Miloslav Kabeláč and Karlheinz Stockhausen's Musik im Bauch. One of their members was Pierre Moerlen.
