= Musik im Bauch =

Piece of music composed by Karlheinz Stockhausen

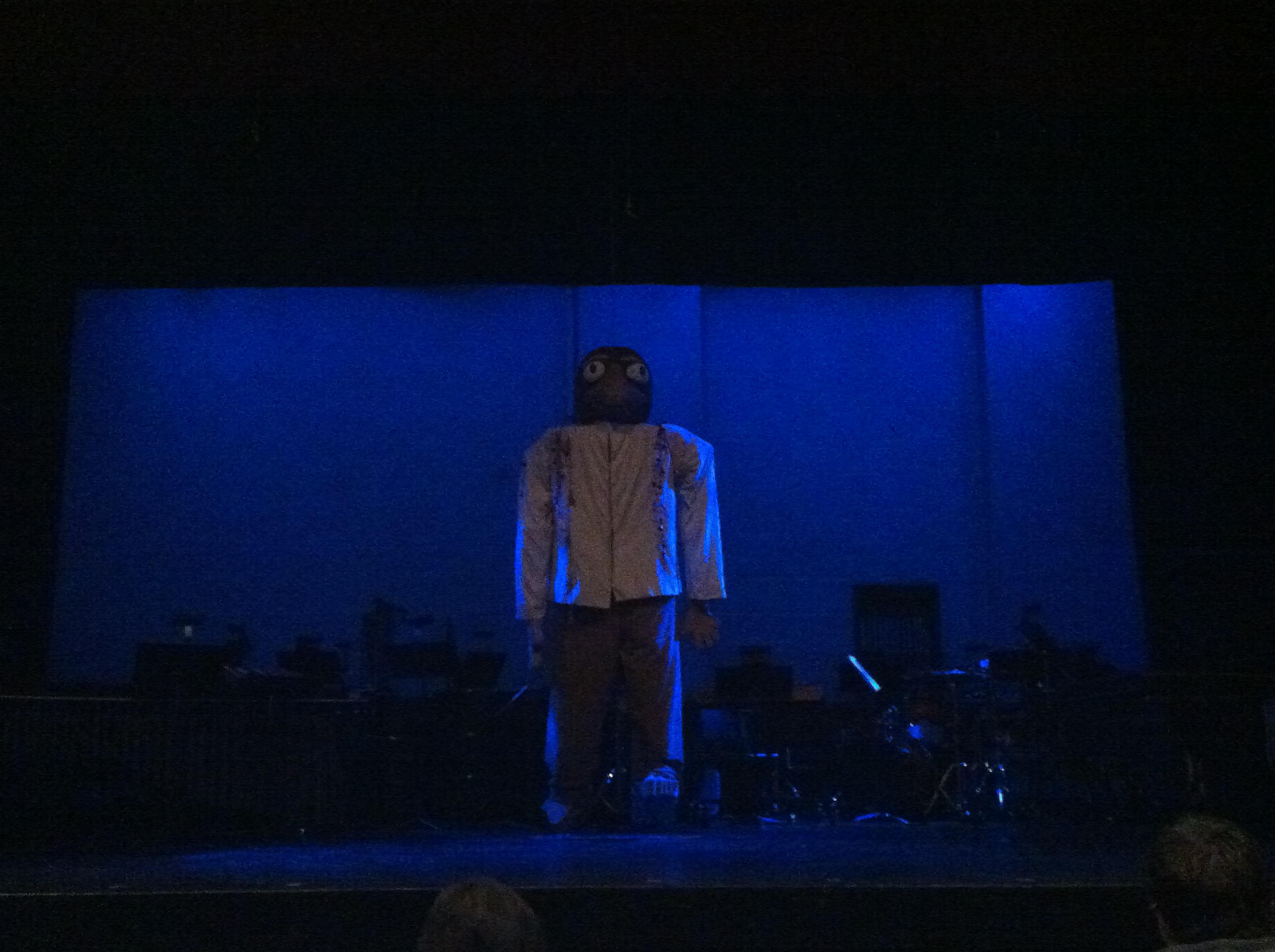
Miron hanging above the stage before a performance of Musik im Bauch at NYU (7 May 2011)

Musik im Bauch (Music in the Belly) is a piece of scenic music for six percussionists and music boxes composed by Karlheinz Stockhausen in 1975, and is Number 41 in his catalog of works. The world premiere was presented on 28 March 1975 as part of the Royan Festival. The performance was given by Les Percussions de Strasbourg in the haras (horse stable) in the town of Saintes, near to Royan. Its duration is roughly 38 minutes.

== History ==
Stockhausen dreamed Musik im Bauch in 1974, seven years after coining the phrase during a memorable evening with his daughter Julika, when she was two years old. All of a sudden, she had all sorts of noises in her insides, and he joked with her, "You have music in your belly!" The phrase prompted the toddler to erupt in laughter, throwing her arms in the air and endlessly repeating "Music in the belly!" Her laughing fit lasted so long that Stockhausen became concerned about her. She only gradually stopped laughing after he put her in bed, where she kept repeating the phrase and giggling as she fell asleep. The first sketch is a single leaf dated 28 February 1974, with brief and fragmentary written notes about the general musical and theatrical course. In the published score, Stockhausen claims it is an exactly written version of what he dreamed. However, some important details from the first sketch were later discarded. The first three melodies later used in this piece, "Aquarius", "Leo", and "Capricorn", were composed in preliminary form later in 1974 during one or more of Stockhausen's composition seminars at the Hochschule für Musik Köln. These melodies were later modified.

In order to present the piece, Stockhausen composed twelve melodies for the zodiac signs, which can be performed independently as Tierkreis. He found a Swiss manufacturer of musical boxes, Reuge, and he hired them to make the boxes, believing that there were no previous original compositions for music boxes in existence.

In Stockhausen's composition catalog, Musik im Bauch is the 41st entry. It spawned at least ten subentries, including Tierkreis, which is numbered as 41½. Musik im Bauch has been characterized as "a fairy tale for children, "a vision of ritualistic savagery", "a blend of fairy tale with American Indian tribal myth", or else as "a ritual played out in Mexican Indian scenery".

Stockhausen cited Musik im Bauch as an example of the extended use of polyphony in his music. In comparison to early works like Gruppen and Zeitmaße, where instruments often play at different speeds, Musik im Bauch represents a massive expansion of such timescales. The two marimba players only perform one Tierkreis melody for the entire piece. Stockhausen comments, "if you want to hear it, you need the ears of a giant, and the memory of a giant, otherwise you will not be able to tell if a wrong note is played, or at the wrong time, they are spread so far apart. Future generations will really have to expand their perception in order to be aware of a melody which unfolds over such a long time".

== Instrumentation ==
The instruments used by the six players are:

- Three chromatic sets of antique cymbals
- One glockenspiel, without pedal
- Three switches, to be whipped in the air
- A chromatic set of Klangplatten (similar to bell plates), or tuned gongs
- A child's spinning top, or else a tubular bell
- One marimba
- Three music boxes, chosen from a set of twelve with the twelve melodies of Stockhausen's Tierkreis

In addition to these instruments, a suspended larger-than-life-size, "bird-man" doll (named Miron), an oversized pair of scissors, and three small tables for the music boxes are required, together with microphones, amplifiers, and loudspeakers.

== Synopsis ==
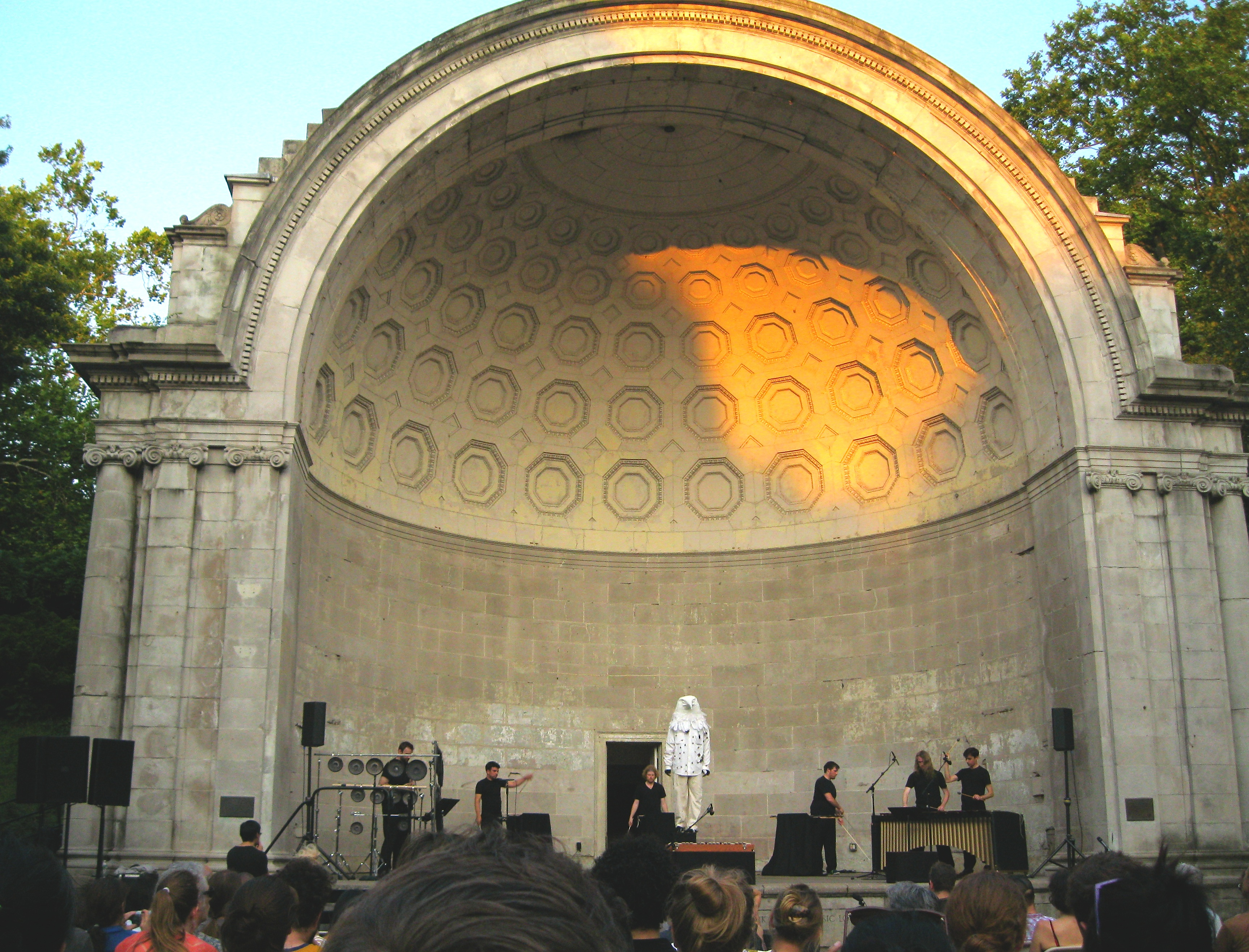
Section II: "The whistling, whipping, and hissing of the switches cleans the air of evil spirits" (Iktus Percussion at the Naumburg Bandshell, Central Park, New York City, Thursday, 21 June 2012)

A larger than life-size (ca. 220 cm) cloth doll of a birdman (a bird's head with large eyes, and a body with human hands and feet) dominates the stage. His name is Miron, and he has a string of bells hung around his neck. Moving like a mechanical doll or automaton, a percussionist enters from the right and walks across the stage to a station of Klangplatten at Miron's left. Three more players enter, in the same mechanical fashion as the first. They take up position at three stations behind Miron. Flanking either side are antique cymbal stations, and directly behind him is a glockenspiel. Two final players, moving very slowly and mechanically as the others, enter and take up position behind a marimba at Miron's right.

In the first section, the performers play their instruments in the same doll-like manner. The three performers at the rear play the antique cymbals and glockenspiel rapidly, blurring together high overtones. The marimba attendants play independently of everyone, seeming to be in their own separate world. The Klangplatten performer plays independently as well, but he eventually strikes a tubular bell.

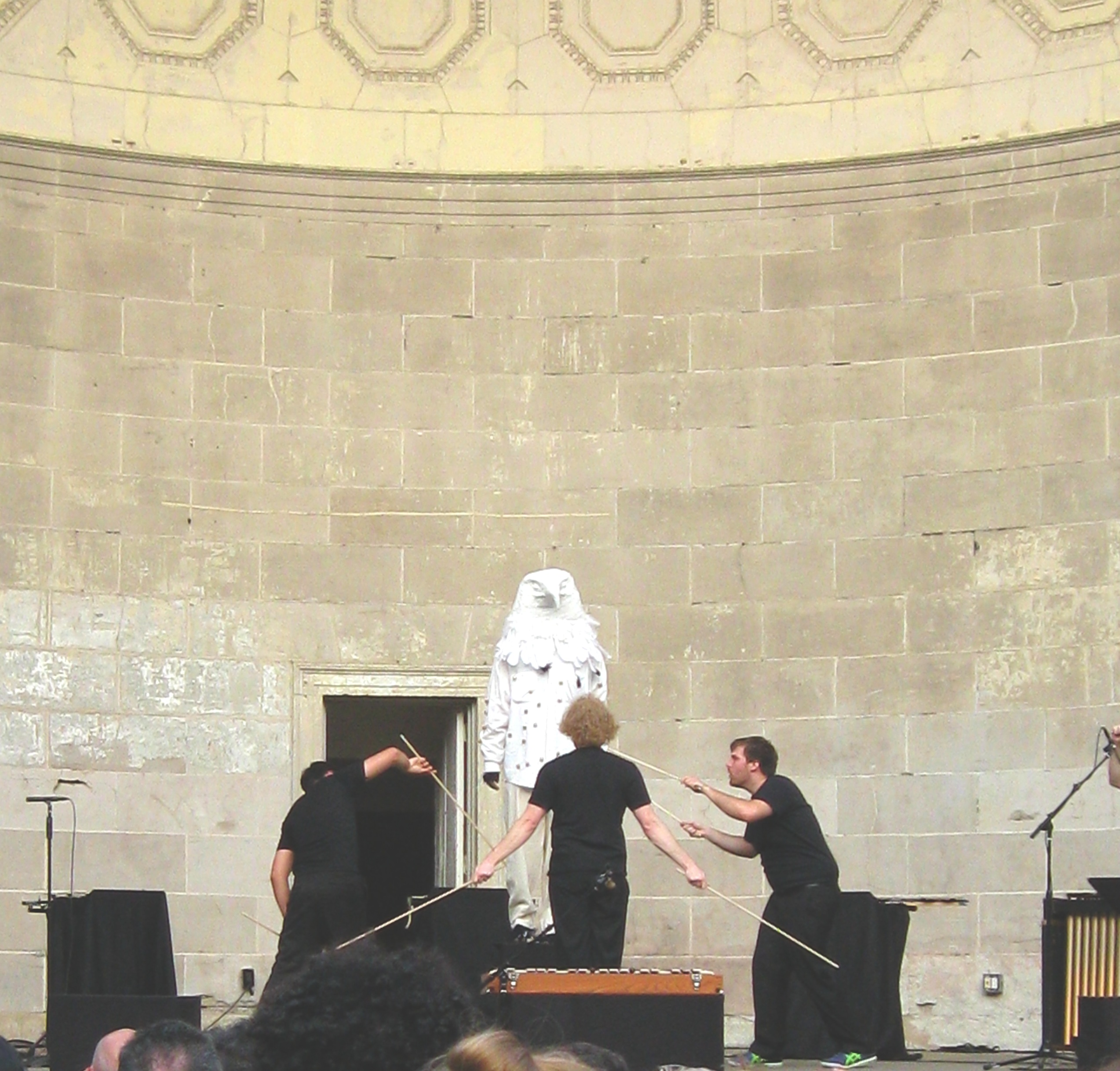
Section IV: "The three players begin a bizarre course, circling around Miron, first running very slowly and gradually becoming faster ... until they create a dense rattling and tinkling of the bells and tramping on the floor, through an ecstatic dance with wild leaps".

In the second section of the piece, the three performers in the rear gradually change their behavior at the sound of the tubular bell strike. They abandon their antique cymbals and glockenspiel for switches, which they whip in the air in all directions. The switches' whistling, hissing, and whipping cleans evil spirits from the air. When they hear two more strikes of the tubular bell, they approach Miron, while they continue to whip. They investigate Miron, occasionally whipping his body lightly. Slowly, they begin to circle Miron, hitting him more frequently, causing his bells to rattle. They work themselves into a frenzy, whipping Miron and dancing ecstatically as they circle him.

In the final section of the piece, the tubular bell sounds three more times, causing the whipping players to freeze. One of them runs offstage and returns with a pair of scissors. He uses the scissors to cut open Miron's shirt, and he reaches inside his belly. He pulls out a music box. He places the music box on one of three small tables at the front of the stage and opens it. Hearing a melody, he goes to a second glockenspiel which is located in front of Miron, and he plays along with the music box melody. The Klangplatten performer interrupts him, and he runs offstage. The other two whippers follow suit in turns, retrieving a music box from Miron's belly, placing it on one of the tables, and playing along with their melody on the glockenspiel.

The Klangplatten eventually stop sounding, and the player exits the stage. The two marimba performers finish playing and exit as well. After the third whipper plays along with his music box, he winds up all three boxes and starts them. He bows to Miron and exits the stage, leaving the music boxes to play their melodies until they wind down.

== Performance practice ==
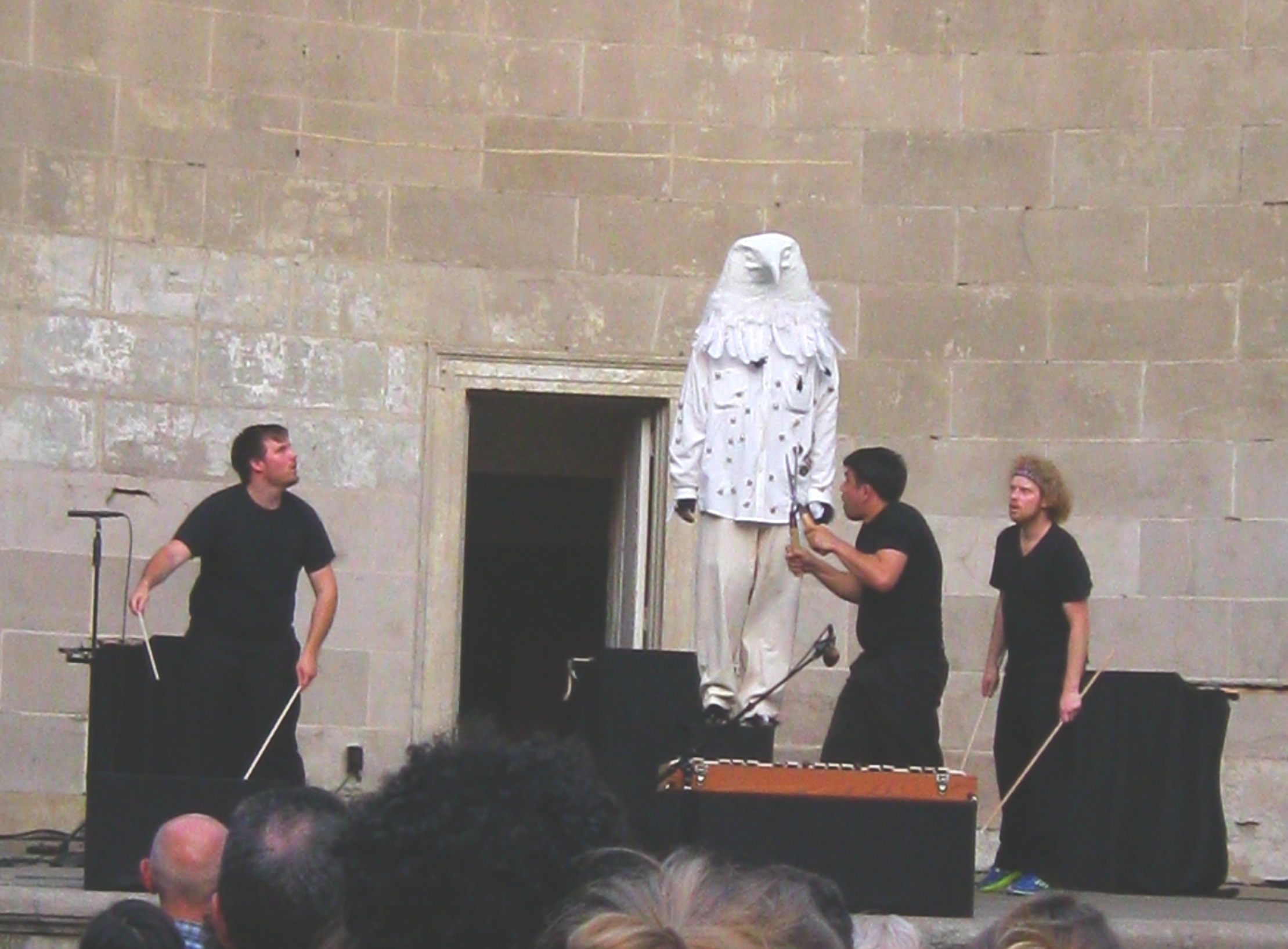
Section V: "Player 1 looks to the exit, runs out, comes back with a large pair of scissors and cuts open Miron's stomach ..."

The performers choose any three of the twelve Tierkreis melodies to determine the form of the piece. Because these three melodies can be combined in a variety of different hierarchies, the possibilities are endless. For instance, if the chosen melodies are Leo, Aquarius, and Capricorn, in the first section, the Klangplatten performer will play an attenuated version of the Leo melody that lasts seven minutes. The marimba players will perform Capricorn for 28 minutes. The antique cymbals and glockenspiel performers repeat fragments of the three melodies in varied tempos. The melodies are stretched and distorted into incomprehensibility, and only the appearance of the music boxes at the end clarifies the source material for the piece.

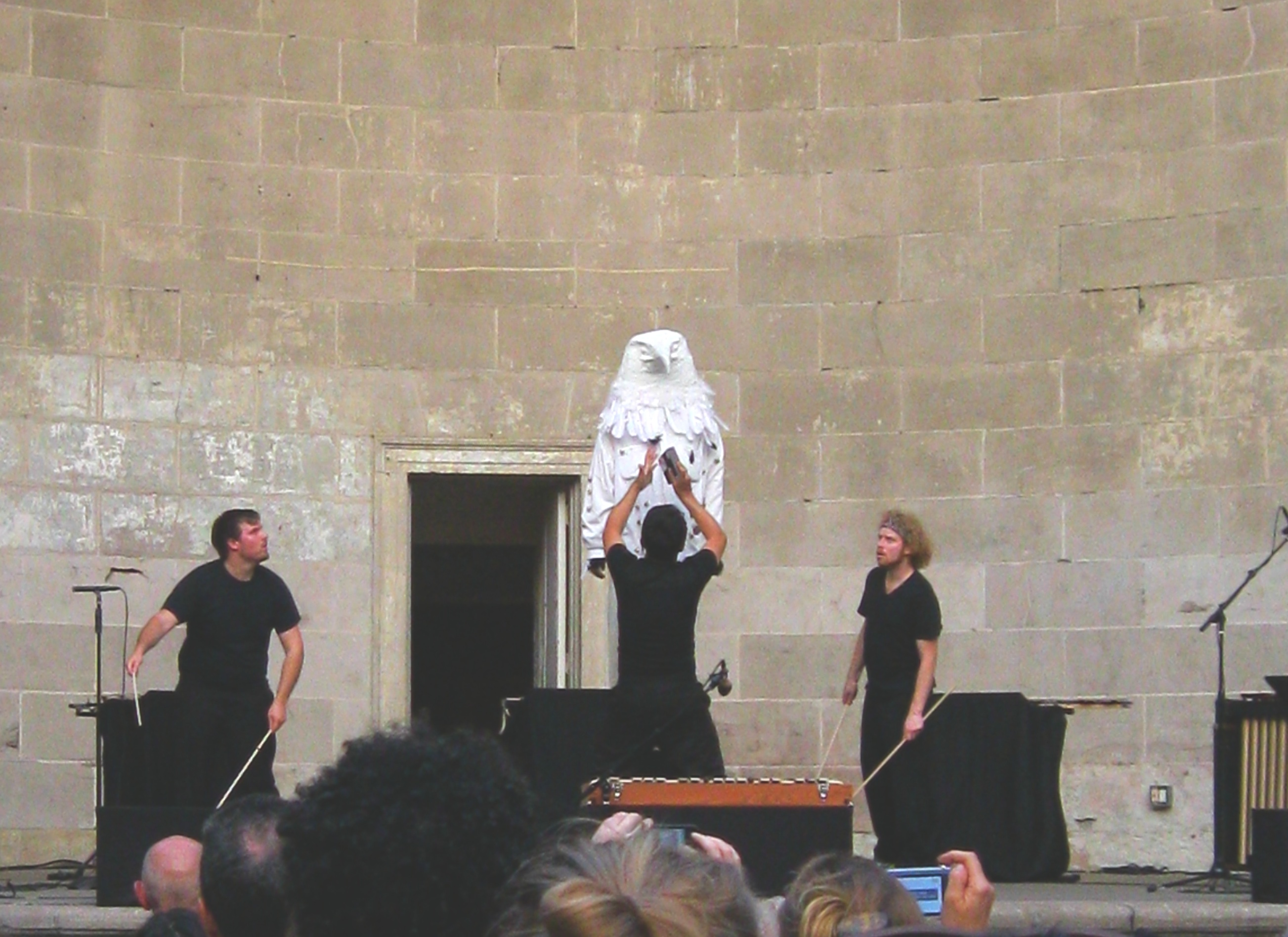
"He searches inside the stomach with his hand, pulls out a small wooden box, ... places the box on the table, ... opens it, and the music box melody ... begins".

Klangplatten (sound plates) are a custom instrument that Stockhausen purchased from a manufacturer named M. Grabmann in Bockum. They are similar to bell plates, except for the fact that they are made of bronze, which emulates the sound of low church bells. If Klangplatten are not available, the performer may use tuned gongs.

The Klangplatten player also has the option of signaling the other players with either a tubular bell or a spinning top, which plays an overtone chord.

Stockhausen indicates that the central trio of performers should either play on three sets of antique cymbals (crotales) or two sets of antique cymbals and one glockenspiel.

The marimba players are so independent of the others that Stockhausen indicates their attenuated versions of the Tierkreis melodies can be presented as separate pieces, provided they also perform in the same mechanical way. However, these versions are not listed separately in Stockhausen's catalog of works.

The music boxes with the zodiac melodies can be ordered from the Stockhausen-Verlag.

== Discography ==
- Stockhausen: Musik im Bauch / Music in the Belly / Musique dans le ventre. Les Percussions de Strasbourg. With Tierkreis für 12 Spieluhren. LP recording. DG 2530 913. Hamburg: Deutsche Grammophon, 1977. Reissued on CD, Stockhausen Complete Edition CD 24. Kürten: Stockhausen-Verlag, 1992.
