= Hansford Rowe (musician) =

Musician

- Origin: New York City, U.S.
- Genre: Jazz fusion
- Occupation: Bassist
- Instruments: Bass guitar; guitar
- Website: hansfordrowe.com

Hansford Rowe is an American fusion bass guitarist.

A largely self-taught musician, Rowe started his career in playing bass in a local New York City band in jazz clubs, until he met drummer Pierre Moerlen. He moved to France with Moerlen and became a member of Gong, taking part in their transformation into Pierre Moerlen's Gong (PMG) in 1977, playing on their albums Expresso II, Downwind, Live, Time is the Key and Leave It Open. In 1986, he appeared on a re-united PMG album Breakthrough and in 1988 on Second Wind and Full Circle Live '88.

Rowe has worked with the likes of Mike Oldfield, Allan Holdsworth, John Martyn, Biréli Lagrène, La Monte Young, David “Fuze” Fiuczynski, Gary Husband and many others. He was also responsible for the development of the Warwick “Just Intonation” bass guitar.

In 1994, he was co-founder of Gongzilla (Musiv Band) with other former PMG members and continues to work with the band.

In 1999, he released a solo album recorded in Quebec and New York City entitled "No Other" . The album was recorded with compatriot Bon Lozaga (guitar) and other guest musicians. The tour for the album featured singer-songwriter Happy Rhodes.

In 2001, Rowe and Lozaga played on Rhodes' album, Find Me, and toured the album in 2004.

In 2013, Rowe played on Karneef's album Love Between Us (Club Roll Records).

Rowe is currently performing in the band HR3, a musical trio which consists of Rowe on bass, together with guitarist Julien Sandiford and drummer Max Lazich. The trio released their debut album in 2013, which was recorded at Piccolo Studio in Montreal, and produced by Denis Savage.

== Sources ==
- "Hansford Rowe". www.calyx-canterbury.fr.
- Amador, Raul (10 June 2019). "Interview with Bassist Hansford Rowe". bassmusicianmagazine.com.
