= Leave It Open (album) =

Studio album by Pierre Moerlen's Gong
- Released: 1981
- Recorded: Stars & Stripes, London
- Genres: Jazz rock, progressive rock
- Length: 38:15
- Label: Arista
- Producer: Pierre Moerlen

Pierre Moerlen's Gong chronology
| Time Is the Key (1979) | Leave It Open (1981) | Breakthrough (1986) |

Leave It Open is the fifth studio album by Pierre Moerlen's Gong. It was released in 1981.

The album is notable for the prominent use of vibraphone, and features the American jazz saxophonist Charlie Mariano, the band's only album to do so, and was their last release for a major label.

== Track listing ==
All tracks are written by Pierre Moerlen, except where noted.

Side one
| No. | Title | Length |
|---|---|---|
| 1. | "Leave It Open" | 17:25 |
| 2. | "How Much Better It Has Become" | 3:29 |

Side two
| No. | Title | Length |
|---|---|---|
| 1. | "I Woke Up This Morning Felt Like Playing Guitar" | 3:36 |
| 2. | "It's About Time" (Hansford Rowe) | 6:11 |
| 3. | "Stok Stok Stok Sto-Gak" (Hansford Rowe) | 4:13 |
| 4. | "Adrien" | 3:46 |

== Personnel ==
Pierre Moerlen's Gong

- Pierre Moerlen – drums, vibraphone, gong, keyboards, synthesizer bass, rhythm guitar
- Hansford Rowe – bass, rhythm guitar
- Bon Lozaga – guitar
- François Causse – percussion, drums

Guest musicians

- Charlie Mariano – saxophone (1, 2, 3, 4)
- Demelza – congas (1)
- Brian Holloway – rhythm guitar (2)

=== Production credits ===
- Nick Bradford – assistant
- Gordon Johnson – assistant
- Ian Jones – assistant
- Graham Lawson – executive producer
- Keith Moore – assistant
- Sheila Rock – photography
