= Hippodrome de Pantin =

Coordinates: 48.894°N 2.393°E

Hippodrome de Pantin was a permanent circus-style tent venue located in the Parc de la Villette near the Porte de Pantin Métro stop in north-eastern Paris. It was constructed in 1974 as the Paris home of the Jean Richard Circus, and in that period, was known as the Nouvel Hippodrome de Paris. The Hippodrome featured a faux neo-classical front and a yellow and blue big-top canopy. It could seat approximately 3,500 people. In 1980 subsequent to the closing of the nearby Pavillon de Paris, the Hippodrome also hosted numerous musical performances, especially touring rock bands. In 1982, the Jean Richard Circus ceased operations, and the Hippodrome was demolished in order to be replaced on the same site by a larger, concert-specific space. The new concert venue, Zénith de Paris, opened in 1983.

== Performance chronology ==
- 1977: Chicago (3-5 Feb), Téléphone (2 Apr), Festival Délirock with Jacques Higelin, Téléphone, Urban Sax (23 Apr), Urban Sax (30 Apr), Chris Hillman Band + Roger McGuinn Band + Gene Clark (7 May), Klaus Schulze (9 May), Chuck Berry (11 May), Magma (14 May), Gong & Family (28 May), Iggy Pop (23 Sep), Peter Gabriel (4 Oct), Steve Hillage + Tim Blake (5 Oct), Rory Gallagher (6 Oct), Wishbone Ash (7 Oct), Henry Cow + Albert Marcoeur + Etron Fou Leloublan (8 Oct), Bob Seger (11 Oct), Peter Gabriel (30 Oct), Uriah Heep (10 Nov), Caravan (14 Nov), Van der Graaf (17 Nov), Fête du Parti Socialiste with Jacques Higelin, Eddy Mitchell, Bernard Lavilliers, Captain Beefheart, Urban Sax, Hot Tuna, Randy Weston, Henry Cow, National Health, Planet Gong, Bloom, Surya, Edition Spéciale, Larry Martin Factory, Soho (20-21 Nov)
- 1978: Festival Antirouille with Jacques Higelin, Ange, Djamel Allam (3 Feb)
- 1979: Status Quo (17 Feb), Scorpions (28 Mar)
- 1980: The Allman Brothers Band, Kiss (27 Sep) and Rod Stewart (16 Oct)
- 1981: Stray Cats (date unknown), James Brown (26 Jan), Johnny Hallyday (24 Mar), The Clash (8 May), Status Quo (18 May), Grateful Dead(17 Oct) Genesis (19-20 Oct), Sean Tyla and Pat Benatar (25 Oct)
- 1982: Roxy Music (date unknown), Stray Cats (7 Feb), Frank Zappa (19 May), Téléphone (4 Nov), New York City Rap (special touring ensemble of rap artists) (27 Nov), Rainbow (28 Nov)
- 1983: Eric Clapton (24 Apr)
