= Pierre Moerlen's Gong =

Instrumental jazz rock band

- Also known as: Gong (1976), Gong-Expresso (1976–1978)
- Genres: Jazz rock; progressive rock; Canterbury scene
- Years active: 1976–1988; 2002–2005 2010–present
- Spinoff of: Gong

Pierre Moerlen's Gong was an instrumental jazz rock band led by French drummer Pierre Moerlen which developed as an offshoot of the Canterbury scene band Gong founded and led by Daevid Allen. It was notable for the prominent use of mallet percussion, particularly vibraphone, in a jazz rock context.

== History ==
Amid a flurry of line-up changes in the mid-1970s, including the departure of founding members Daevid Allen and Gilli Smyth, Gong drummer Pierre Moerlen was left in charge of the band with two albums remaining on a contract with Virgin.

Moerlen formed a new line-up with his brother Benoit on mallet percussion, US-born bassist Hansford Rowe, and a rotating cast of session guitarists, notably Allan Holdsworth, Mick Taylor, Mike Oldfield, and Bon Lozaga.

They released two albums under the Gong moniker, Gazeuse! (called Expresso in North America) in 1976 and then Expresso II in 1978. Following the completion of the Virgin contract, Moerlen changed the name of the group to Pierre Moerlen's Gong. In early 1979, the group released Downwind, which was a more rock/pop flavoured album that featured occasional lead vocals by Moerlen himself and a cameo by Steve Winwood. Later in 1979 they released another album, Time is the Key, that took the band further into pop/rock territory. The live album "Pierre Moerlen's Gong Live" was released in 1980, followed by another studio album, Leave It Open, in 1981. By this point, Pierre Moerlen's incarnation of Gong scaled back its activity greatly, not releasing another record until 1986's Breakthrough, featuring members of the Swedish band Tribute. Second Wind followed in 1988. The group quietly disbanded soon after.

Lozaga, Rowe, and Benoit Moerlen went on to form Gongzilla in the early 1990s, releasing four albums to date which are very much an extension of the percussive fusion that the original group brought to the fold, and they perform a mix of new and old live material going back to the Gazeuse/Expresso II period. Moerlen joined them for their 2002 European tour.

Moerlen revived the Pierre Moerlen's Gong name in 2002 and recorded the album Pentanine with Russian musicians.

The last Pierre Moerlen's Gong album was started in 2005 with another new line-up, this time of young French musicians, when Moerlen died unexpectedly on 3 May 2005, age 53, of natural causes. Although the project was at an early stage, the band nevertheless decided to record Pierre's last compositions, along with some of their own, and release it posthumously as Tribute in 2010.

== Personnel ==
Gazeuse! (1976)	Expresso II (1978)	Downwind (1979)	Time is the Key (1979)
Pierre Moerlen – drums, percussion, synthesisers; Benoit Moerlen – percussion; Mireille Bauer – percussion; Didier Malherbe – saxophone, flute; Francis Moze – bass, piano, percussion; Mino Cinelu – percussion; Allan Holdsworth – guitars, violin	Pierre Moerlen – drums, percussion, synthesisers; Benoit Moerlen – percussion; Mireille Bauer – percussion; Hansford Rowe – bass, guitars; François Causse – percussion; Allan Holdsworth – guitars	Pierre Moerlen – drums, percussion, synthesisers; Benoit Moerlen – percussion; Hansford Rowe – bass, guitars; François Causse – percussion; Ross Record – guitars, vocals; Additional personnel: Mike Oldfield – guitar on Downwind	Pierre Moerlen – drums, percussion, synthesisers; Hansford Rowe – bass, guitars; Bon Lozaga – guitars; Peter Lemer – keyboards; Additional personnel: Allan Holdsworth – guitars
Pierre Moerlen's Gong Live (1980)	Leave It Open (1981)	Breakthrough (1986)	Second Wind (1988)
Pierre Moerlen – drums, percussion, synthesisers; Hansford Rowe – bass; Bon Lozaga – guitars; François Causse – percussion; Benoit Moerlen – percussion	Pierre Moerlen – drums, percussion, synthesisers; Hansford Rowe – bass, guitars; Bon Lozaga – guitars; François Causse – percussion; Demelza – percussion; Brian Holloway – guitars; Charlie Mariano – saxophone	Pierre Moerlen – drums, percussion, synthesisers, vocals; Hansford Rowe – bass, guitars; Ake Zieden – guitars; Dag Westling – guitars; Michaël Zilka – Chapman stick; Chris Rhedin – keyboards; Lena Andersson – vocals; Nina Andersson – vocals	Pierre Moerlen – drums, percussion, synthesisers, vocals; Benoit Moerlen – percussion, synthesisers; Hansford Rowe – bass, guitars; Ake Zieden – guitars; Alex Sanguinetti – drums; Simon Pomara – percussion; Frank Fischer – keyboards; Stefan Traub – percussion, synthesisers
Full Circle Live '88 (1998)	Pentanine (2004)	Tribute (2010)
Pierre Moerlen – drums, percussion, synthesisers, vocals; Hansford Rowe – bass, guitars; Ake Zieden – guitars	Pierre Moerlen – drums, percussion, synthesisers; Meehail Ogorodov – keyboards, percussion, vocals; Arkady Kuznetsov – guitars; Alexei Pleschunov – bass	Matias Canobra – vibraphone; Marc-Antoine Schmitt – bass; Samuel Klein – drums; Sébastien Kohler – guitar; Daniel Bunzli – percussion

== Discography ==
- 1976: Gazeuse! (Expresso in North America) (issued as a "Gong" album)
- 1978: Expresso II (issued as a "Gong" album)
- 1979: Downwind
- 1979: Time Is the Key
- 1980: Pierre Moerlen's Gong Live
- 1981: Leave It Open
- 1986: Breakthrough
- 1988: Second Wind
- 1998: Full Circle Live '88
- 2004: Pentanine
- 2010: Tribute (post-Pierre Moerlen)

== Filmography ==
- 2015: Romantic Warriors III: Canterbury Tales (DVD)
