= Mireille Bauer =

French musician

Mireille Bauer (born 24 August 1951, Barr, Alsace, northeastern France) is a French vibraphonist, marimbist and percussionist and former member of Gong.

Through her then boyfriend Pierre Moerlen, she first worked with Gong in a session capacity on Angel's Egg (1973) and You (1974) before joining the band fully for albums including Expresso II (1978, by which time the band had become Pierre Moerlen's Gong). She subsequently left the band and joined progressive rock/fusion band Edition Speciale (1978-9). During this period, she was living with Gong bassist Francis Moze.

In the 1980s, she played in John Greaves' backing band, working alongside François Ovide. She later married Ovide and had two children.

She subsequently worked with Art Zoyd in the 1990s.

== Sources ==
- Calyx biography
