= Benoît Moerlen =

French percussionist (born 1956)

- Born: Benoît Moerlen; February 6, 1956 (age 70); Paris, France
- Genres: Progressive rock, electronica, space rock
- Occupation: Instrumentalist
- Instruments: Drums, percussion, keyboards
- Formerly of: Gong, Pierre Moerlen's Gong, Gongzilla

Benoît Moerlen (born 6 February 1956) is a French percussionist, best known for his work in Gong, Pierre Moerlen's Gong and a later offshoot Gongzilla.

== History ==
Moerlen studied the vibraphone at the Strasbourg Conservatory, where his elder brother Pierre Moerlen had also studied percussion.

Moerlen first played with Gong on 1974's You, Pierre already being a member. He joined more permanently for Gazeuse! (1976) and Expresso II (1978) when the band had come under Pierre's leadership. The latter was released under the Gong name in the UK, but as by Pierre Moerlen's Gong in North America. The band toured Europe in support. Benoît remained with the band for Downwind (1979) and Live (released 1980). Having left in 1979, Benoît joined Pierre in Mike Oldfield's touring band, and he appears on the resultant live album Exposed (1979).

He re-joined Pierre Moerlen's Gong in the late 1980s for Second Wind and Full Circle Live '88, also playing additional keyboards. He also appeared with Pierre on Oldfield's Islands (1987).

Moerlen was then a founding member of Gongzilla, playing vibraphone and marimba, with bassist Hansford Rowe and guitarist Bon Lozaga, with whom he had played in Pierre Moerlen's Gong. They released Suffer (1995) and Thrive (1996, with guests David Torn and Gary Husband).

Moerlen also plays solo marimba concerts in France, Belgium and Germany, and works in a duo called Akimbo with the German vibraphone player Stefan Traub. In 2005, Benoît was rehearsing with Pierre for a new line-up of Pierre Moerlen's Gong when Pierre died in his sleep on 3 May, aged 52.

== Filmography ==
- 2015: Romantic Warriors III: Canterbury Tales (DVD)
