= Francis Moze =

French bass player (born 1946)

Francis Moze (born 2 February 1946) is a French bass player and pianist, best known for his work in Magma, Gong and Pierre Moerlen's Gong.

Moze played in an early line-up with Magma. When he left the group, Giorgio Gomelsky introduced him to Gong. He played on the album Flying Teapot (1973). He re-joined what had by then become Pierre Moerlen's Gong for the Gazeuse! (1976) album (in the U.S., it was called Expresso).

After Pierre Moerlen's departure, Moze stayed in London, joining Peter Lemer's trio, also with Laurie Allan on drums. In the late 1980s, John Greaves (playing keyboards), Pip Pyle (drums) and Moze formed a short-lived band.

Moze is of Seminole descent.
