= Didier Malherbe =

French musician (born 1943)

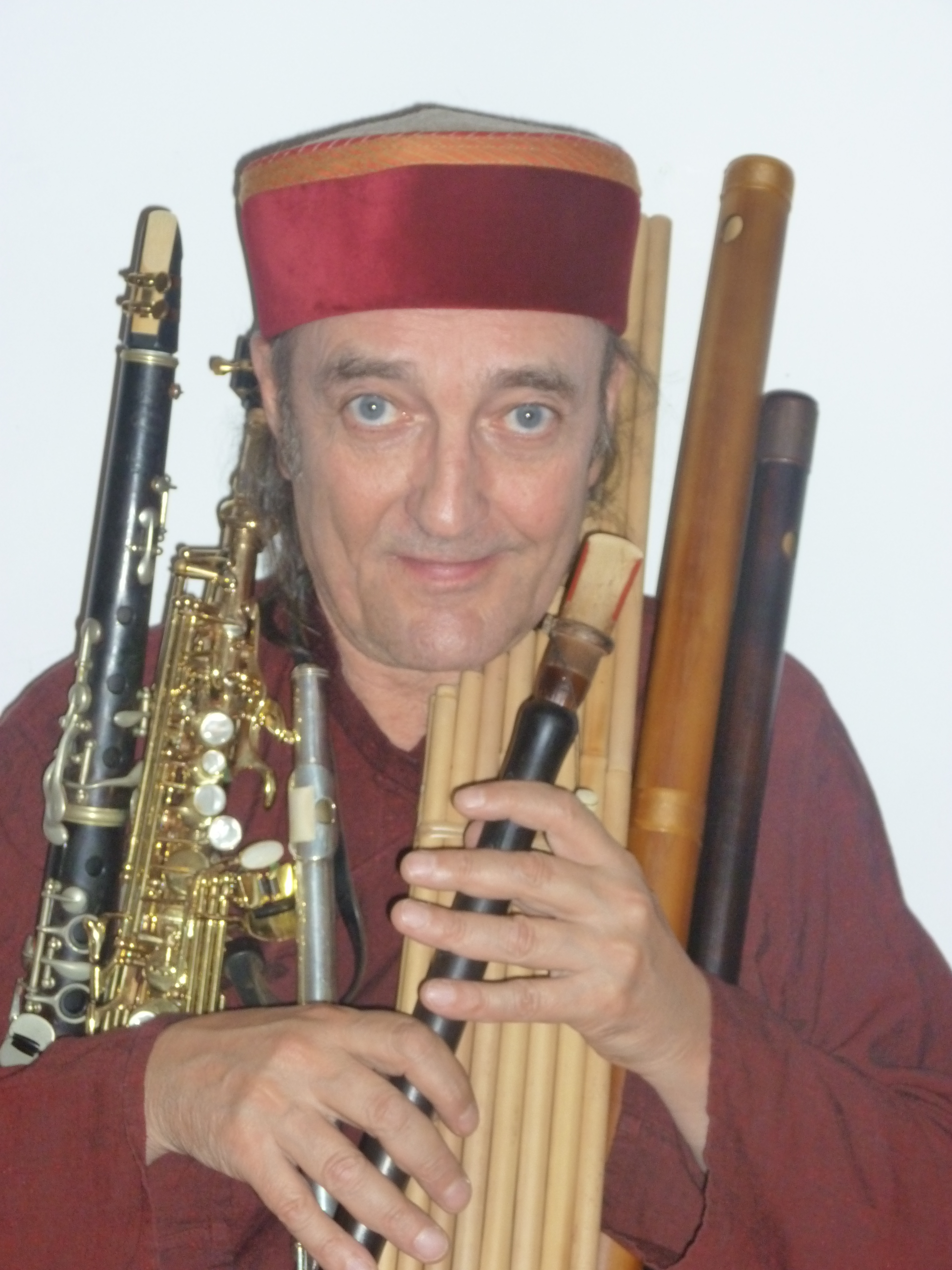
- Malherbe in 2011

Background information
- Also known as: Bloomdido Bad de Grasse
- Born: 22 January 1943 (age 83); Paris, France
- Genres: Jazz rock; chamber jazz; folk rock; progressive rock; psychedelic rock
- Occupation: Musician
- Instruments: Flute; tenor saxophone; soprano saxophone; duduk; hulusi; keyboards
- Years active: 1960–present
- Formerly of: Gong; Hadouk
- Website: www.didiermalherbe.com

Didier Malherbe (Note: Also known as "Bloomdido" or "Bloomdido bad de Grass") (born 22 January 1943) is a French musician and poet. He has played in several bands, including Gong and Hadouk.

Malherbe plays the saxophone, flute, alto clarinet, ocarina, Laotian khaen, Chinese bawu and hulusi, and other wind instruments. Since 1995, the duduk has been one of his preferred instruments.

== Early life ==
Didier Malherbe was born on 22 January 1943 in Paris, France. He began playing the saxophone at the age of thirteen after hearing Charlie Parker's "Bloomdido", a title he would eventually adopt as his nickname. After two years of formal training on the saxophone, he began to participate in jam sessions at various Paris jazz clubs with musicians such as Alby Cullaz, Eddy Louiss, and Jacques Thollot. He then moved away from jazz, stating, "I had grown puzzled about bebop because of so many rules. Then free jazz arrived, which got rid of all the rules [...] I decided I'd rather look elsewhere".

In 1962, after listening to Ravi Shankar's first album, Malherbe traveled to India, where he discovered the bamboo flute and learned to play the Indian bansuri flute. Back in Paris, he studied ancient languages and classical flute at Sorbonne University. During 1964–65, he traveled around Morocco, staying in a community in Tangier and playing alongside other musicians, such as the guitarist Davey Graham. During this time, he learned the elements of Arabic music.

In 1966, Malherbe played saxophone with Les Rollsticks in Marc'O's musical comedy Les Idoles. In 1968, the film version of Les Idoles was released.

In the summer of 1968, Malherbe moved to Majorca in the Balearic Islands and lived on the property of the writer Robert Graves. During this period, he practiced flute and spent time with Kevin Ayers and Daevid Allen, two former members of Soft Machine. He later described their performance at the Fenêtre Rose festival in late 1967 as "a triggering event".

In 1969, he returned to Paris and joined a raga-blues-folk trio named Morning Calm. He also played free jazz with American pianist Burton Green, appearing on his album recorded for the BYG label. The same label released Magick Brother (1969), the first Gong album, on which Malherbe performed alongside musicians from various pop and jazz backgrounds.

== Career ==
=== Gong (1969–1977) ===
Gong debuted at the Amougies festival in October 1969. Malherbe received the stage name "Bloomdido Bad De Grasse" from Daevid Allen, a combination of the title of the Charlie Parker standard and a comedic translation of his surname.

The albums Camembert Electrique (1971) and Continental Circus (1972, the soundtrack to Jérôme Laperrousaz's movie of the same name) made Gong, alongside Magma, a part of the French underground scene of the early 1970s. Malherbe remained with Gong after line-up changes, even staying on after Daevid Allen quit in 1975 following the Radio Gnome Invisible trilogy, released by the later-fledgling Virgin label: Flying Teapot and Angel's Egg (1973), then You (1974).

Following the departures in 1975 of Allen and Steve Hillage, Gong shifted to a more jazz-fusion style, influenced by Weather Report, with Malherbe adding a world-music flavor, as exemplified by "Bambooji" on the album Shamal (1976), an early suggestion to his later work as a solo artist. A final line-up with a percussion section and Allan Holdsworth on guitar recorded Gazeuse! (1977).

=== Bloom (1977–1981) ===
In 1977, Malherbe formed the band Bloom, playing a fusion of jazz and rock. They recorded an eponymous album in 1978, and the band toured extensively in France. In 1981, it was replaced by smaller line-ups: Duo du Bas with Yan Emeric Vagh and Duo Ad lib with Jean-Philippe Rykiel.

In 1978, Malherbe played on three songs for Gilli Smyth's Charly Records release Mother, also appearing on her LP Fairy Tales under the band name "Mother Gong", featuring guitarist Harry Williamson.

In 1980, Malherbe recorded his first solo album, Bloom, which had a jazz-fusion sound and French vocals.

=== Faton Bloom (1982–1987) ===
In 1982, Malherbe began a partnership with Faton Cahen, former pianist with Magma and Zao, which they called Faton-Bloom. The band was made of Rémy Sarrazin (bass), Éric Bedoucha (drums) and Roger Raspail. An eponymous album released in 1986, accompanied by touring.

During that period, Malherbe also worked with singer Jacques Higelin, on stage (the live album Casino de Paris in 1984) and in studio (the album Aï in 1985).

He also played on the debut album by Equip'Out, a band led by ex-Gong drummer Pip Pyle, and joined Daevid Allen in a new line-up of Gong, which resulted in the album Shapeshifter (1992).

=== Solo/duo (1990–1998) ===
In 1990, Malherbe released his second solo album, Fetish, with a cast of musicians, later calling the album "very scattered". He notably experimented with the Yamaha WX7, a wind synthesizer.

He then signed with the Tangram label, releasing Zeff in 1992, which was met with critical and commercial success. The sound of the "Zeff", a harmonic bent PVC pipe, also was included in Vangelis's soundtrack for Ridley Scott's movie 1492: Conquest of Paradise and was featured on public TV channel France 3.

This was followed by Fluvius (1994), with a quartet including Loy Ehrlich, Henri Agnel, and Shyamal Maïtra. In 1996, Hadouk was formed with Loy Ehrlich, named in reference to their respective instruments of choice, hajhouj (a.k.a. guembri or sintir; a bass of the Gnawas of Morocco) and duduk (a double-reed Armenian oboe).

Also during the 1990s, Malherbe toured with Classic Gong in both Europe and the U.S. He left the band in 1999, but continued to appear occasionally as a guest star, both on stage (such as on the Subterranea DVD) and on the records Zero To Infinity and 2032.

He also toured and recorded with Brigitte Fontaine on the CD Palaces and with acoustic guitarist Pierre Bensusan's Live at the New Morning CD in 1997.

=== Hadouk Trio (1999–2012) ===
In 1999, the Malherbe/Ehrlich duo was joined by American percussionist Steve Shehan and released the album Shamanimal, credited as the Hadouk Trio. The trio appeared at festivals including Nancy Jazz Pulsations. In 2001, Djivan Gasparyan invited Malherbe to appear at the international duduk festival in Armenia, then in Moscow and Saint Petersburg.

That same year, he published a book of sonnets on reeds, L'Anche des Métamorphoses, which he later turned into a solo show, mixing poetry reading and musical interludes.

In 2003, the second Hadouk Trio CD, Now, was released. The trio appeared at the San Sebastián festival, at Jazz sous les pommiers, and released two live recordings – the double CD Live à FIP (2004) and the DVD Live au Satellit Café (2005) – which marked a partnership with Naïve Records.

The release of the trio's third studio CD, Utopies (2006), coincided with an appearance at the Gong Unconvention in Amsterdam, a festival which peaked with the reunion of Gong's 1970s line-up. Two concerts at Paris's Cabaret Sauvage in May 2007 were documented on the live CD/DVD Baldamore.

The trio's final release, Air Hadouk, released in 2010. It was followed by tours in Great Britain and India and an appearance at the Paris Jazz Festival. In 2013, Naïve Records reissued the first 4 Hadouk Trio CDs as a box set, which coincided with a concert at the Salle Gaveau on 2 February.

In 2010, Malherbe formed a duo with guitarist Éric Löhrer. The following year, they released the double-CD Nuit d'Ombrelle, which mixed jazz standards on duduk with improvisations, arranged as a continuous suite.

Since 2012, he has been playing with classical pianist Jean-François Zygel, appearing on his TV programme La Boîte à Musique on the channel France 2, and has been performing live as a trio with percussionist Joel Grare under the title A World Tour In 80 Minutes.

=== Hadouk Quartet (2013–2020) ===
The Hadouk Quartet formed in 2013 and evolved out of the Hadouk Trio. It consists of Malherbe and Ehrlich, as well as Eric Löhrer and Jean-Luc Di Fraya.

The quartet released their debut CD, Hadoukly Yours, through Naïve Records on November 4, 2013, and added two Chinese wind instruments: Bawu and Hulusi.

== Music and poetry ==
Didier Malherbe has published two books of sonnets: L'Anche des Métamorphoses and Escapade en Facilie.

He created a show of slam poetry and music featuring his favorite instruments, the saxophone, Bawu flute, Chinese Hulusi, alto clarinet, ocarina, Laotian khên, Ukrainian sopilka, Moldavian pipe, and Armenian duduk. This show was performed at the RAMI Festival, the National Stage in Orléans, the Triton, the Nanterre Conservatory, the Baud Media Library, the Poetry Market in Paris, the Esprit Frappeur (Lausanne), and the Domaine de Chamarande Lardy (with La Tribu au Sud du Nord, a French jazz band).

In 2020, he accompanied the poet Zeno Bianu at the Roman Museum in Vienna for the presentation of his book on Chet Baker. He appeared on a France Musique radio broadcast titled "Ocora Couleurs du Monde", where he recited his poems. He also participated in the recording of the CD of the group Alula, Heliotropics.

== Discography ==
=== With Gong ===
- 1970: Magick Brother (BYG)
- 1971: Camembert Electrique (BYG)
- 1971: Continental Circus (Philips)
- 1972: Glastonbury Fayre 1971 (Revelation)
- 1973: Flying Teapot (BYG/Virgin)
- 1973: Angel's Egg (Virgin)
- 1974: You (Virgin)
- 1976: Shamal (Virgin)
- 1977: Gazeuse! (Virgin)
- 1977: Gong est mort, vive Gong (Tapioca/Celluloïd)
- 1977: Live Etc. (Virgin)
- 1990: Live au Bataclan 1973 (Mantra)
- 1990: Live at Sheffield 74 (Mantra)
- 1992: Shapeshifter (Mélodie/Celluloïd)
- 2000: Zero to Infinity (Snapper Music)
- 2009: 2032 (G-Wave)
- 2016: Rejoice! I'm Dead! (Madfish)
- 2019: Love from the Planet Gong – The Virgin years 1973–75 (Virgin 675 890-1)[13-disc box set]

=== Solo albums ===
- 1980: Bloom (EMI/Sonopresse, reissued by Voiceprint)
- 1990: Fetish (Mantra)
- 1992: Zeff (Tangram)
- 1994: Fluvius (Tangram)
- 2003: Windprints / L'Empreinte du Vent (Cezame)

=== Duo albums ===
- 1986: Faton Bloom (Cryonic, reissued by Mantra) – with Faton Cahen
- 1987: Saxo Folies (Koka Media) – with Armand Frydman
- 1995: Hadouk (Tangram) – with Loy Ehrlich
- 1997: Live at New Morning (Acoustic Music) – with Pierre Bensusan
- 2008: Carnets d'Asie et d'Ailleurs (Vox Terrae) – with Loy Ehrlich
- 2011: Nuit d'Ombrelle (Naïve) – with Éric Löhrer
- 2021: The Yanqging & the Wind (Cezame) – with Yaping Wang

=== With Hadouk Trio (Didier Malherbe / Loy Ehrlich / Steve Shehan) ===
- 1999: Shamanimal (Mélodie rééd; Naïve)
- 2002: Now (Mélodie rééd; Naïve)
- 2004: Hadouk Trio Live à FIP (Mélodie / Abeille Musique)
- 2006: Utopies (Naïve)
- 2007: Baldamore (Naïve)[CD & DVD] – Live au Cabaret Sauvage
- 2010: Air Hadouk (Naïve)
- 2013: Coffret Intégrale Hadouk Trio (Naïve)

=== With Hadouk Quartet (Didier Malherbe / Loy Ehrlich / Eric Löhrer / Jean-Luc Di Fraya) and Hadouk Duo (Didier Malherbe / Loy Ehrlich) ===
- 2013: Hadoukly Yours (Naïve)
- 2017: "Le Cinquieme Fruit" (Naïve)
- 2024: "Le Concile des Oiseaux" sur le label Hadouk continuo UVM [archive]

=== As sideman ===
- 1969: Burton Greene, Aquariana (BYG)
- 1971: Dashiell Hedayat, Obsolete (Shandar, reissued by Mantra)
- 1972: Kevin Ayers, Whatevershebringswesing (Harvest)
- 1974: Hatfield and the North, Hatfield and the North (Virgin)
- 1974: Comus, To Keep from Crying (Virgin)
- 1974: Robert Wood, Vibrarock (Polydor)
- 1975: Clearlight, Clearlight Symphony (Virgin)
- 1975: Steve Hillage, Fish Rising (Virgin)
- 1978: Clearlight, Visions (Polydor)
- 1979: Pierre Moerlen's Gong, Downwind (Arista)
- 1980: Pierre Moerlen's Gong, Live (Arista)
- 1981: Mother Gong, Robot Woman 1 (Butt)
- 1981: Harry Williamson, Anthony Phillips, and Gilli Smyth, Battle of the Birds (Ottersongs, reissued by Voiceprint)
- 1982: Pierre Bensusan, Solilaï (RCA)
- 1982: Mother Gong, Robot Woman 2 (Shanghai)
- 1982: Lili Drop, N (Arabella)
- 1983: Jacques Higelin, Casino de Paris (Pathé-Marconi)
- 1985: Jacques Higelin, Aï (Pathé-Marconi)
- 1987: Pip Pyle, Pip Pyle's Equip' Out (52e Rue Est, reissued by Voiceprint)
- 1988: Mimi Lorenzini, Orchestra V (Muséa)
- 1988: Anthony Phillips and Harry Williamson, Tarka (PRT/Baillemont, reissued by Voiceprint)
- 1989: Brigitte Fontaine, French Corazon (Midi)
- 1991: Un Drame Musical Instantané, Urgent Meeting (Grrr)
- 1993: Short Wave, Live (Gimini)
- 1993: Loy Ehrlich, Les Îles du Désert (Tangram)
- 1994: Richard Sinclair, R.S.V.P. (Sinclair Songs)
- 1994: Jacques Higelin, Aux Héros de la Voltige (EMI)
- 1997: Brigitte Fontaine, Les Palaces (Virgin)
- 1998: Pip Pyle, Seven Year Itch (Voiceprint)
- 2000: Various artists, Soup Songs Live: The Music of Robert Wyatt (Voiceprint)
- 2001: Brigitte Fontaine, Kekeland (Virgin)
- 2005: Eric Séva, Folklores Imaginaires (Harmonia Mundi)
- 2006: Steve Shehan, Elevations (Safar Éditions)
- 2006: Phil Miller's In Cahoots, Conspiracy Theories (Crescent Discs)
- 2010: Areski Belkacem, Le Triomphe de l'Amour (Universal)
- 2014: Clearlight, Impressionist Symphony (Gonzo Multimedia)
- 2017: Pascal Obispo, Jésus de Nazareth à Jérusalem (Sony) – CD BO du spectacle
- 2017: Hend Zouari, Bledi (Diwan Musik Company)
- 2017: Jan Schumacher, Tara – CD Jazzenvue
- 2018: Catherine Lara, Bô, le Voyage Musical (Warner) – CD BO du spectacle
- 2021: ALULA, Héliotropiques – CC 03

== Filmography ==
- 1967: Chappaqua by Conrad Rooks (music by Ravi Shankar)
- 1968: Les Idoles by Marc'O (music by Stéphane Vilar and Patrick Greussay)
- 1972: Continental Circus by Jérôme Laperrousaz (with Gong)
- 1972: Le Grand Départ by Martial Raysse (with Gong)
- 1992: 1492: Christophe Colomb by Ridley Scott (music by Vangelis)
- 1999: Les Quatre Saisons d'Espigoule by Christian Philibert (music by Michel Korb)
- 2004: Blueberry by Jan Kounen (music: Jean-Jacques Hertz et François Roy )
- 2005: Kirikou et les Bêtes sauvages by Michel Ocelot (music: Manu Dibango)
- 2005: Iznogoud by Patrick Braoudé (music: Jacques Davidovici)
- 2006: Sa Majesté Minor by Jean-Jacques Annaud (music by Javier Navarreté)
- 2007: 99 Francs by Jan Kounen (music: Jean-Jacques Hertz et François Roy)
- 2010: The Lady by Luc Besson (music by Éric Serra)
- 2013: La danza de la realidad de Alejandro Jodorowsky (musique Adan Jodorowsky)
- 2015: Romantic Warriors III: Canterbury Tales (DVD)
- 2021: Les Survivants by Guillaume Renusson (music by Olivier Militon)
