= List of Gong band members =

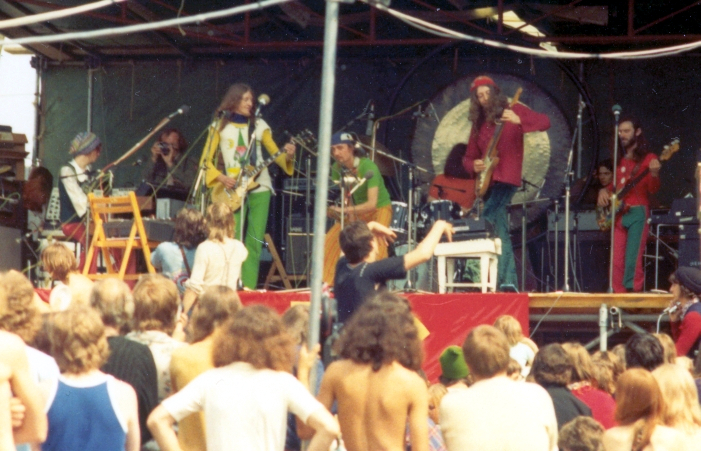
(left to right) Tim Blake, Daevid Allen, Didier Malherbe, Rob Tait, Steve Hillage and Mike Howlett

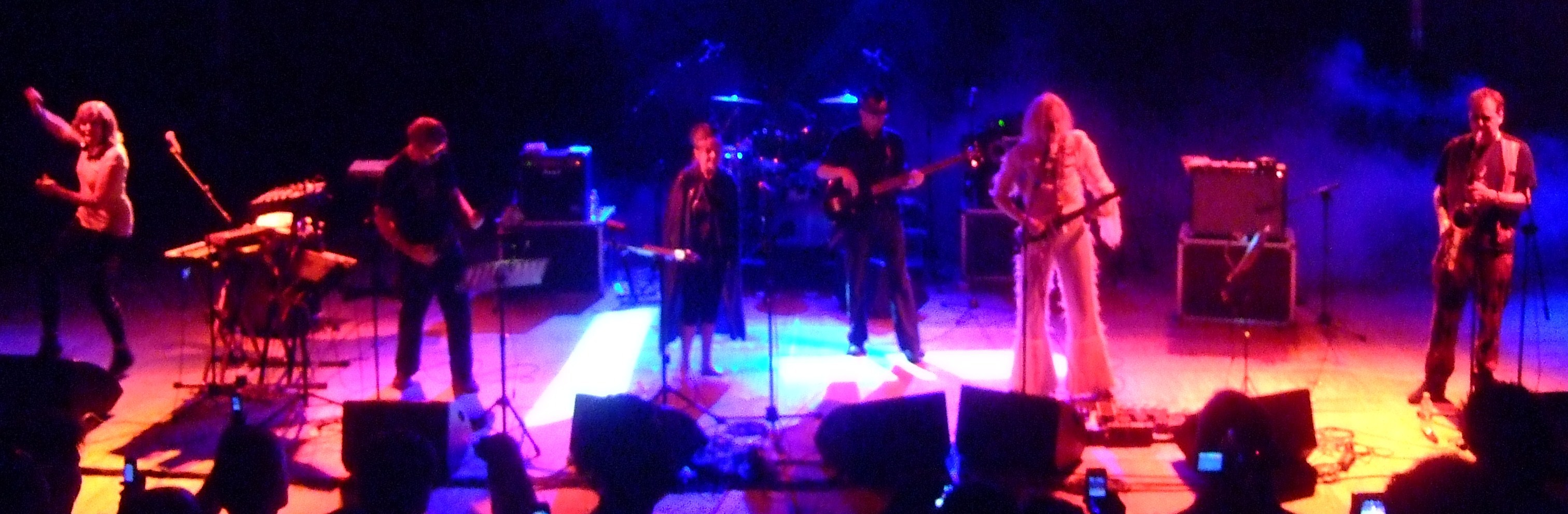
(left to right) Miquette Giraudy, Steve Hillage, Gilli Smyth, Chris Taylor, Dave Sturt, Daevid Allen and Theo Travis

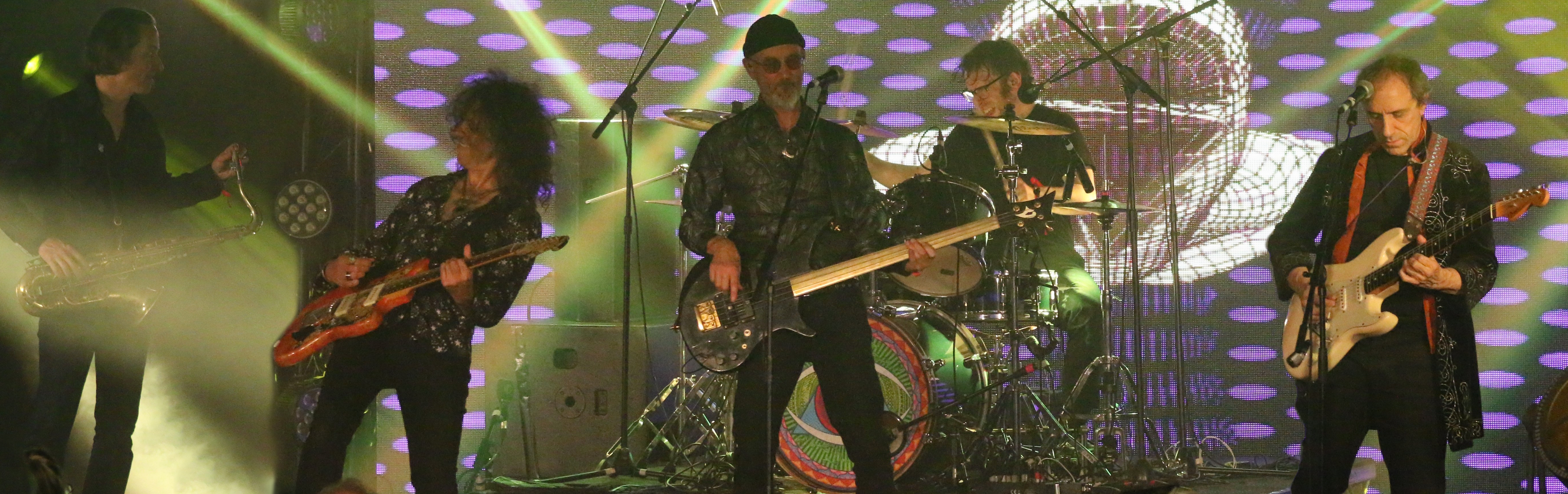
(left to right) Ian East, Kavus Torabi, Dave Sturt, Cheb Nettles and Fabio Golfetti

Three line-ups of Gong performing in 1974, 2009 and 2023

Gong are a Franco/British rock band founded by Australian vocalist/guitarist Daevid Allen and English vocalist Gilli Smyth in 1967. The band's first recording line-up featured Allen and Smyth alongside bassist Christian Tritsch, drummer Rachid Houari and saxophonist/flautist Didier Malherbe. The band's current line-up from Allen's death on 13 March 2015 features lead guitarist Fabio Golfetti (in 2007 and since 2012), bassist Dave Sturt (since 2009) saxophonist/flautist Ian East (since 2010), vocalist/guitarist Kavus Torabi (since 2014) and drummer Cheb Nettles (since 2014).

== History ==
=== 1967–1976 ===
In September 1967, Australian singer and guitarist Daevid Allen, a member of the English psychedelic rock band Soft Machine, was denied re-entry to the United Kingdom for 3 years following a French tour because his visa had expired. He settled in Paris, where he and his partner, London-born Sorbonne professor Gilli Smyth, established the first incarnation of Gong (later referred to by Allen as "Protogong") along with Ziska Baum on vocals and Loren Standlee on flute. However, the nascent band came to an abrupt end during the May 1968 student revolution, when Allen and Smyth were forced to flee the country after a warrant was issued for their arrest. They headed for Deià in Mallorca, where they had lived for a time in 1966.

In August 1969, film director Jérôme Laperrousaz, a close friend of the pair, invited them back to France to record a soundtrack for a motorcycle racing movie which he was planning. This came to nothing at the time, but they were subsequently approached by Jean Karakos of the newly-formed independent label BYG Actuel to record an album, and so set about forming a new electric Gong band in Paris, recruiting their first rhythm section of Christian Tritsch (bass) and Rachid Houari (drums and percussion) and re-connecting with a saxophonist called Didier Malherbe whom they had met in Deià. However, Tritsch was not ready in time for the sessions and so Allen played the bass guitar himself. The album, entitled Magick Brother, was completed in October.

Houari left the band in the spring of 1971 and was replaced by English drummer Pip Pyle, whom Allen had been introduced to by Robert Wyatt during the recording of his debut solo album, Banana Moon, by the end of the year Pyle had left the group, to be replaced by another English drummer, Laurie Allan. Gong went through increasing line-up disruption in 1972. Laurie Allan left in April to be replaced by Mac Poole, then Charles Hayward and then Rob Tait, before returning again late in the year. Gilli Smyth left for a time, returning to Deià to look after her and Daevid Allen's baby son, and was replaced by Diane Stewart, who was the partner of Tait and the ex-wife of Graham Bond. Christian Tritsch moved to guitar and was replaced on bass by former Magma member Francis Moze, while the band's sound was expanded with the addition of synthesizer player Tim Blake.

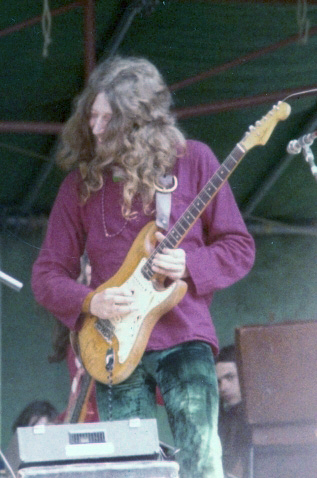
Steve Hillage joined as the bands first lead guitarist in 1972.

In October 1972 they were one of the first acts to sign to Richard Branson's fledgling Virgin Records label, and in late December traveled to Virgin's Manor Studio in Oxfordshire, England, to record their third album, Flying Teapot. Towards the end of their recording sessions they were joined by English guitarist Steve Hillage, whom they had met a few weeks earlier in France playing with Kevin Ayers. He arrived too late to contribute much to the album, but would soon become a key component in the Gong sound.

Flying Teapot was released on 25 May 1973, the same day as Tubular Bells, and was the first instalment of the Radio Gnome Invisible trilogy, which expounded upon the (previously only hinted at) Gong mythology developed by Allen. The second part, Angel's Egg, followed in December, now featuring the 'classic' rhythm section of Mike Howlett on bass and Pierre Moerlen on drums. In early 1974 Moerlen left to work with the French contemporary ensemble Les Percussions de Strasbourg and Smyth left to give birth to her and Allen's second son. They were replaced once again by Rob Tait and Diane Stewart.

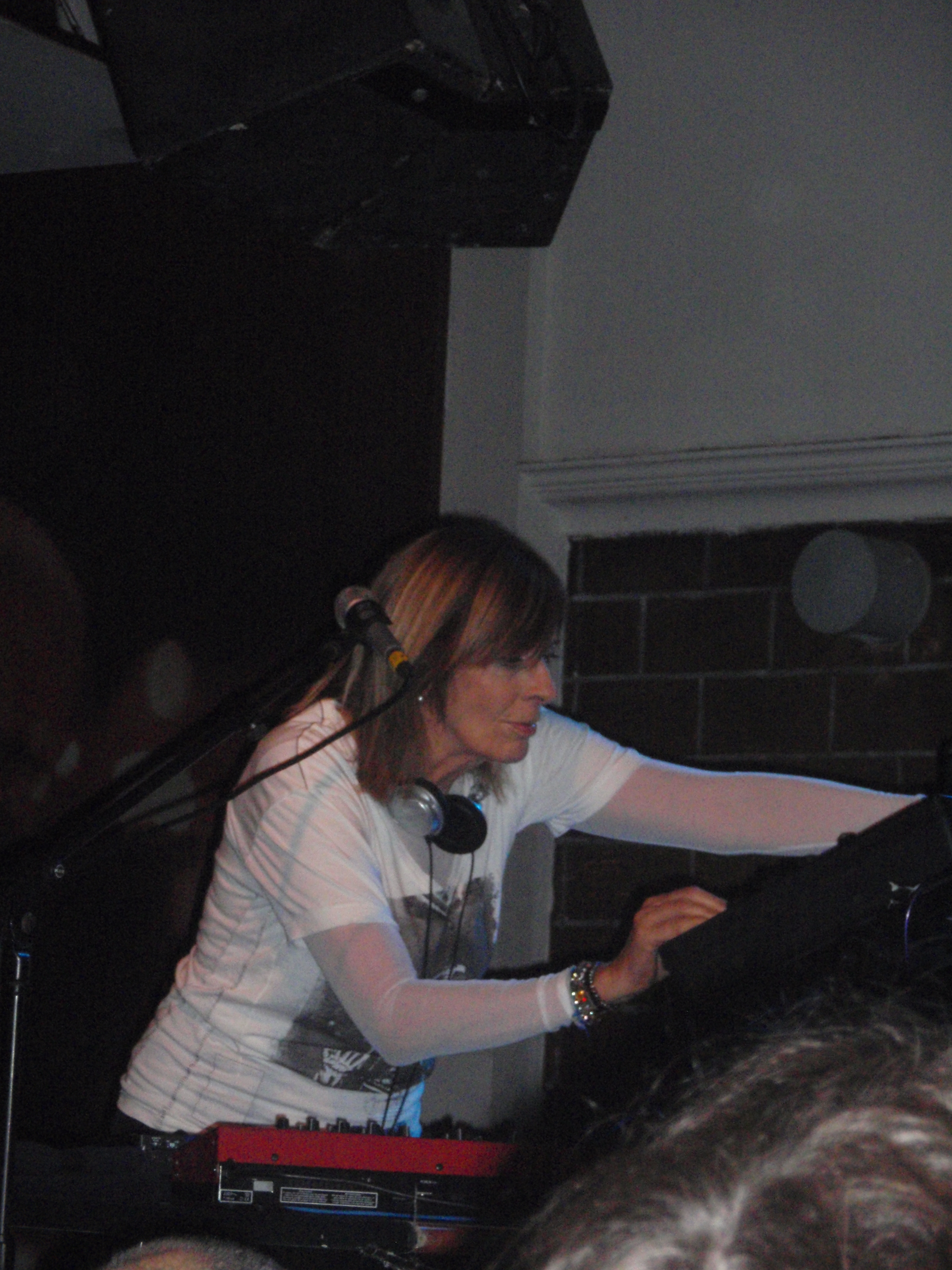
Miquette Giraudy joined as vocalist, replacing Diane Stewart, and remained with the band as synth player for reunions.

Moerlen, and later Smyth, returned in order to complete the trilogy with the album You, but by the time of its release, in October 1974, Moerlen was back with Les Percussions de Strasbourg and Smyth had settled permanently in Deià with her young sons. Prior to touring in support of You, Allen visited Smyth and the boys in Deià, while the rest of the band, including the departed Moerlen, recorded the basic tracks for Hillage's first solo album, Fish Rising. Moerlen was initially replaced in Gong by a succession of stand-ins (Chris Cutler, Laurie Allan and Bill Bruford) until former Nice and Refugee drummer Brian Davison took the job in early 1975. Smyth had already been replaced by Hillage's partner Miquette Giraudy.

Increasing tension and personality clashes led to Tim Blake being asked to leave in February 1975 during rehearsals for a tour. He was not replaced. Then, at a gig in Cheltenham on 10 April, the day before the release of Steve Hillage's Fish Rising album, Daevid Allen refused to go on stage, claiming that a "wall of force" was preventing him from doing so, and he left the band. The others decided to carry on without him.

In August, Pierre Moerlen was persuaded to return, replacing the unhappy and alcoholic Davison, and the band now also added Mireille Bauer on percussion, Argentinian Jorge Pinchevsky on violin and Patrice Lemoine on synthesizer and, for the first time in Gong, keyboards. They toured the UK in November 1975, as documented on the 2005 release Live in Sherwood Forest '75, and worked on material for their next album, Shamal. Hillage, however, was increasingly uncomfortable without Allen, and with now being seen as the band's de facto leader. With a solo career beckoning, he and Giraudy decided to leave before Shamal was completed, participating in it only as guests. Howlett took over as lead male vocalist and Sandy Colley, Lemoine's partner and the band's cook, became his female counterpart.

The album was released in February 1976 and they toured in support until a crisis was precipitated in May when Pinchevsky was refused entry to the U.K. for carrying marijuana. Ex-King Crimson violinist David Cross was tried out as a possible replacement, but before any progress could be made with this new line-up, the band split into two camps: Howlett wanted to keep vocals, but Moerlen and Bauer wanted the music to be entirely instrumental, with Malherbe undecided. Virgin Records executive Simon Draper chose Moerlen's way and Howlett left, quickly followed by Lemoine and Colley.

=== 1976–2007 ===
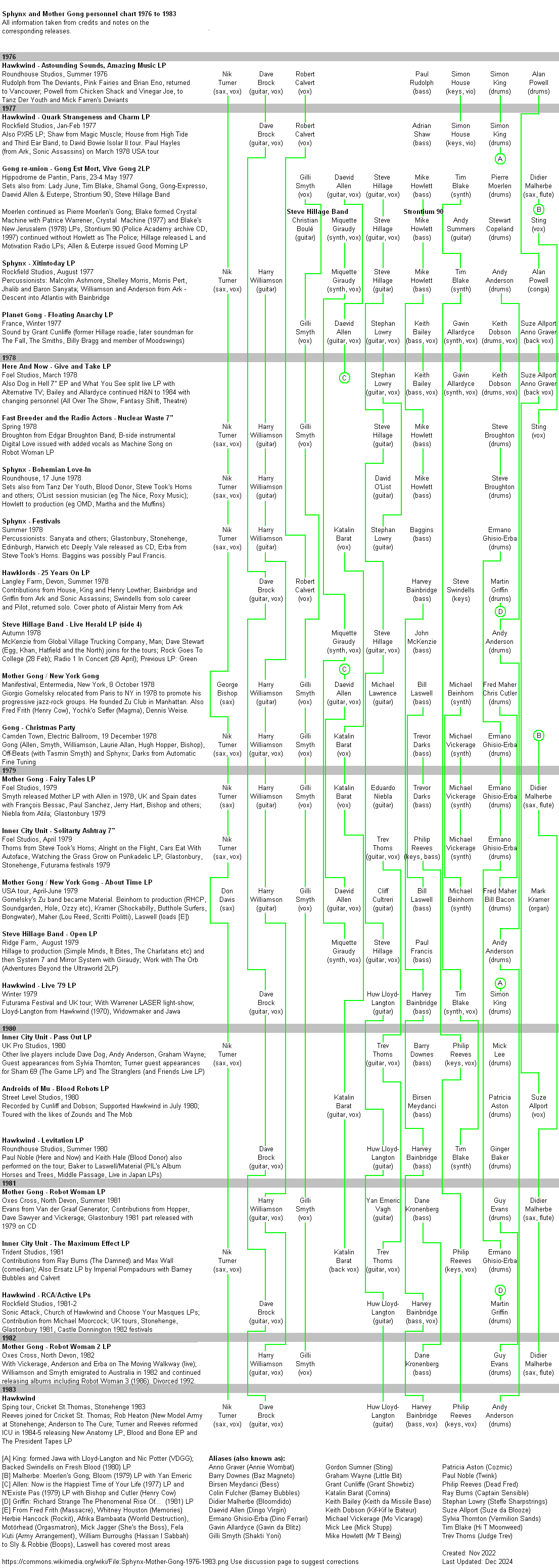
Sphynx and Mother Gong Personnel Chart 1976 to 1983

For contractual reasons, the Gong name remained in play for another two years, but the band was now effectively Pierre Moerlen's Gong, having little to do with the psychedelic space rock of Daevid Allen. Moerlen formed a new mallet percussion based line-up, adding his brother Benoit Moerlen, future Weather Report percussionist Mino Cinelu, journeyman guitarist Allan Holdsworth and Flying Teapot bassist Francis Moze to record the album Gazeuse! in late 1976. Malherbe, Holdsworth, Moze and Cinelu all left soon afterwards, but Moerlen kept a band going with American bassist Hansford Rowe until the late 1980s. To avoid confusion, it first became known as Gong-Expresso and then, from 1978, as Pierre Moerlen's Gong. One last album, Pentanine, was recorded in 2002 with Russian musicians before Moerlen died unexpectedly in May 2005, aged 53.

A Gong reunion event held in Paris in May 1977 brought together all of the current strands which had developed and re-asserted the primacy of the Daevid Allen-led band. It featured sets by Tim Blake, Lady June, Howlett's Strontium 90, Steve Hillage, 'Shamal Gong', Gong-Expresso, Daevid Allen and Euterpe, and was headlined by Trilogy Gong, the classic lineup of Allen, Smyth, Malherbe, Blake, Hillage, Giraudy, Howlett and Moerlen. Their performance was documented on the live album Gong est Mort, Vive Gong. Strontium 90 was Mike Howlett's short-lived band which was notable for having two bass players, and for introducing Police members Sting and Stewart Copeland to their future guitarist Andy Summers.

Daevid Allen continued to develop the Gong mythology in his solo albums and with two new bands: Planet Gong (1977), which comprised Allen and Smyth playing with the British festival band Here & Now, and New York Gong (1979), comprising Allen and the American musicians who would later become known as Material. At the same time, Gilli Smyth formed Mother Gong with English guitarist/producer Harry Williamson and Didier Malherbe, and played in Spain and England. Allen delighted in this proliferation of groups and considered his role at this time to be that of an instigator, traveling around the world leaving active Gong-related bands in his wake.

After spending most of the Eighties in his native Australia, Allen returned to the UK in 1988 with a new project, The Invisible Opera Company of Tibet, whose revolving cast included violinist Graham Clark and Gong saxophonist Didier Malherbe. This morphed into Gongmaison in 1989, which added Harry Williamson from Mother Gong and had a techno-influenced sound with electronic beats, as well as live percussion from Shyamal Maïtra. In 1990, the Gong name was revived for a one-off U.K. T.V. appearance with a line-up featuring Allen, Smyth and Malherbe, plus early 70s drummer Pip Pyle and three members of Here & Now (band): Stephen Lewry (lead guitar), Keith Bailey (bass) and Paul Noble (synth). In April 1992, Gongmaison became Gong permanently with the combined line-up of Allen, Malherbe, Bailey and Pyle, plus Graham Clark and Shyamal Maïtra from Gongmaison. Together they recorded the album Shapeshifter (subsequently dubbed Radio Gnome Invisible, Part 4) and toured extensively.

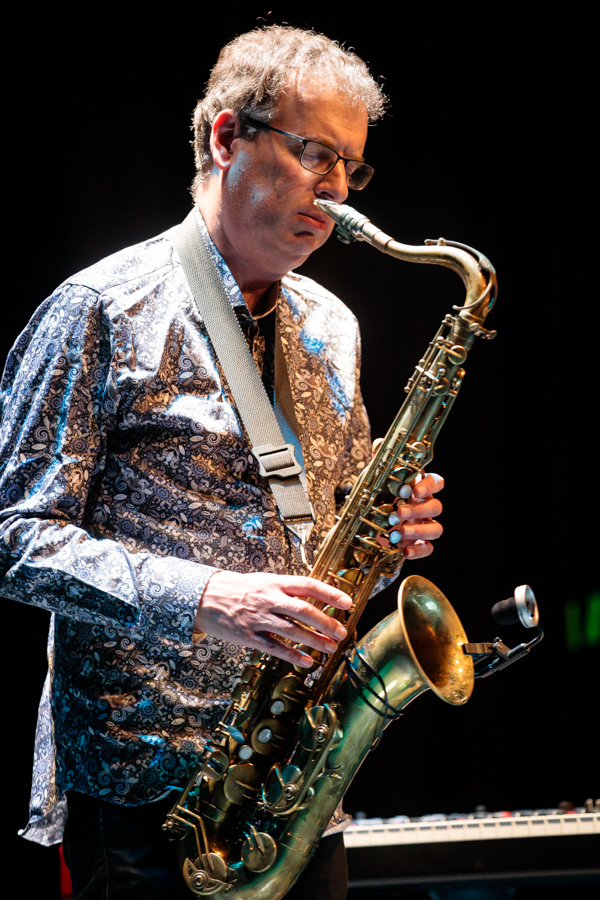
Theo Travis joined as second woodwind player in 1999.

In 1994, Gong celebrated its 25th birthday with a show in London which featured the return of Gilli Smyth, bassist Mike Howlett and lead guitarist Stephen Lewry of Here & Now. This formed the basis of the band which toured worldwide from 1996 to 2001, with Pierre Moerlen replacing Pip Pyle on drums from 1997 through 1999. The album Zero to Infinity was released in 2000, by which time the line-up had changed again to Allen, Smyth, Malherbe and Howlett, plus new recruits Theo Travis on sax/keys and Chris Taylor on drums. This line-up was unique in the band's history in having two sax/flute players.

2003 saw a radical new line-up including Acid Mothers Temple members Kawabata Makoto and Cotton Casino, plus University of Errors guitarist Josh Pollock. Allen and Smyth's son Orlando drummed on the 2004 studio album Acid Motherhood, but for the subsequent live dates the rhythm section was Ruins drummer Tatsuya Yoshida and Acid Mothers Temple bassist Tsuyama Atsushi. A live album recorded by this line-up in 2004 was released as Acid Mothers Gong Live Tokyo and they played a few more one-off shows in 2006 and 2007.

The European version of Gong had retired from regular touring in 2001, but there were subsequent one-off reunions, most notably at the "Gong Family Unconventions" (Uncons), the first of which was held in 2004 in the Glastonbury Assembly Rooms as a one-day event and featured many ex-members and Gong family bands including Here & Now, House of Thandoy, Thom the Poet, Invisible Opera Company, Andy Bole, Bubbledub and Joie Hinton. The 2005 Uncon was a 2-day affair featuring several Gong-related bands such as Here & Now, System 7, House of Thandoy and Kangaroo Moon. The next Uncon was a 3-day event held at the Melkweg in Amsterdam on 3–5 November 2006, with practically all Gong-related bands present: 'Classic' Gong (Allen, Smyth, Malherbe, Blake, Howlett, Travis, Taylor, plus the return of Steve Hillage and Miquette Giraudy), System 7, The Steve Hillage Band, Hadouk, Tim Blake and Jean-Philippe Rykiel, University of Errors, Here & Now, Mother Gong, Zorch, Eat Static, Sacred Geometry Band, Acid Mothers Gong and many others. These events have all been compèred by Thom the Poet (now "Thom Moon 10").

=== 2007 onwards ===
In November 2007, Daevid Allen held a series of concerts in Brazil with a new band which he called Gong Global Family. This consisted of Allen on vocals and guitar, Josh Pollock on guitar, Fabio Golfetti (of Violeta de Outono) on guitar, Gabriel Costa (also from Violeta de Outono) on bass, Marcelo Ringel on flute and tenor saxophone, and Fred Barley on drums. He also performed with his other band, University of Errors (Allen, Pollock, Barley and Michael Clare).

In June 2008, Gong played two concerts in London, at Queen Elizabeth Hall on the South Bank (opening Massive Attack's Meltdown festival) and at The Forum, with a line-up of Allen, Smyth, Hillage, Giraudy, Howlett, Taylor and Travis. This line-up then released a new album, 2032, in 2009 and toured in support, including the Glade stage at Glastonbury Festival. They played at The Big Chill festival in the UK on 9 August 2009 with Allen, Smyth, Hillage, Giraudy, Travis, Taylor and new bassist Dave Sturt, as well as the Beautiful Days festival in Devon and the Lounge On The Farm festival near Canterbury.

Gong played four UK live shows in September 2010 with Allen, Smyth, Hillage, Giraudy, Sturt, Taylor and new wind player Ian East. Support for these shows was provided by Nik Turner's Space Ritual.

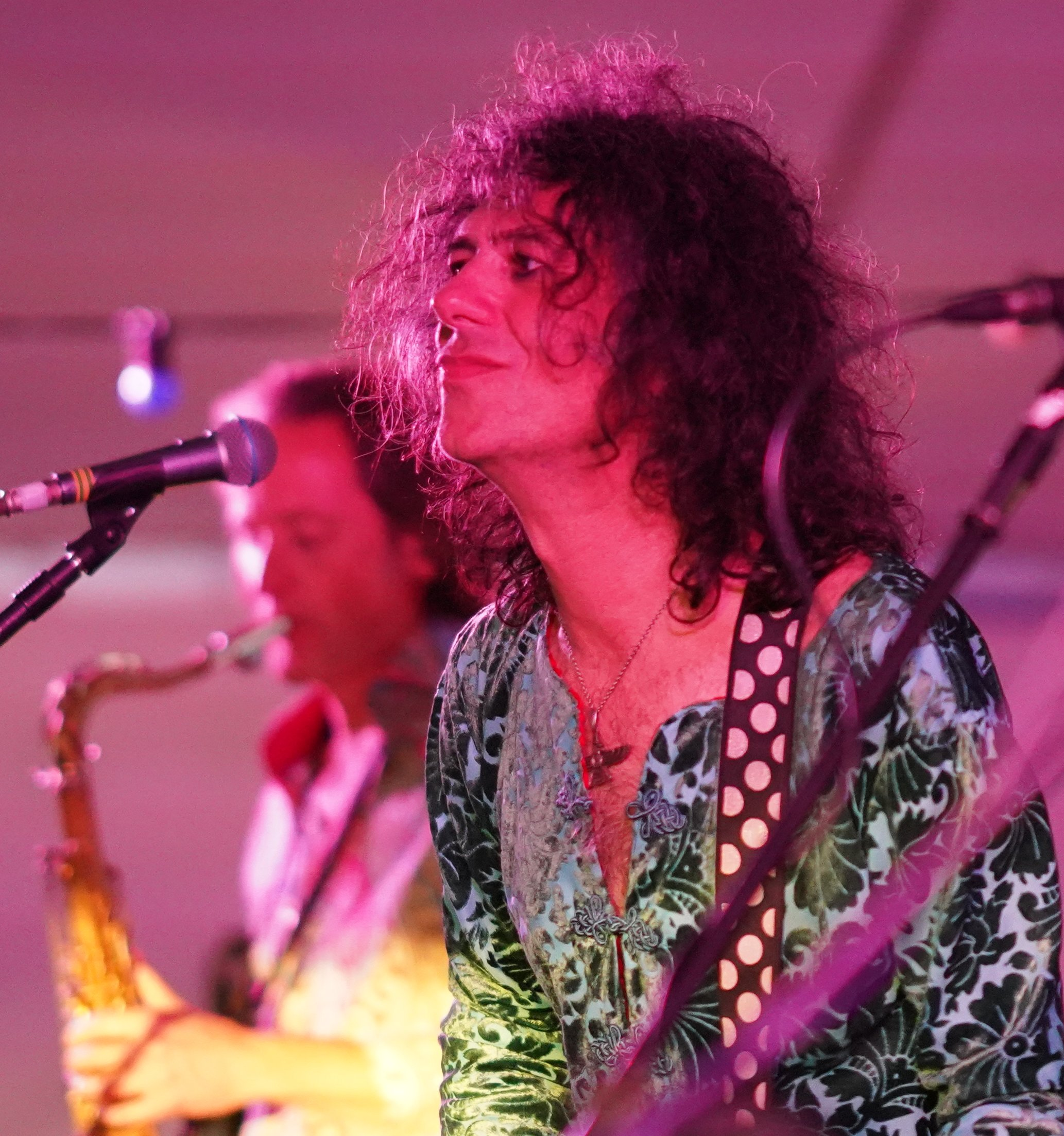
Kavus Torabi joined as second guitarist in 2014 and later became frontman after the death of Daevid Allen.

Gong toured Europe in the fall of 2012 with the line-up of Allen, Smyth, Sturt and East, plus Orlando Allen (Acid Mothers Gong) on drums, and Fabio Golfetti (Gong Global Family) on guitar. It would be Gilli Smyth's final tour with the band. They played in Brazil in May 2013 and again in 2014, this time with the addition of Kavus Torabi on guitar.

The 2014 line-up released a new studio album entitled I See You on 10 November, with Gilli Smyth guesting. However, Daevid Allen had been diagnosed with a cancerous cyst in his neck and had to undergo radiation therapy followed by an extensive period of recuperation. The I See You tour went ahead without him, and the line-up of Sturt, East, Golfetti, Torabi and a "mystery drummer" (revealed to be Cheb Nettles) played five dates in France and two in the UK.

On 5 February 2015, Daevid Allen released a statement announcing that the cancer had returned to his neck and had also spread to his lungs, and that he was "not interested in endless surgical operations", leaving him with "approximately six months to live". Just over a month after the initial announcement, on 13 March 2015, Daevid's son Orlando announced through Facebook that Allen had died in Byron Bay, Australia, aged 77.

On 11 April 2015, it was revealed that Allen had written an email to the band prior to his death, expressing his wish that the five remaining members continue performing following his passing and suggesting that Kavus Torabi become the new frontman of the band.

Gilli Smyth died on 22 August 2016, aged 83. She had been admitted to hospital in Byron Bay with pneumonia a couple of days previously.

On 5 July 2016, it was announced that the band line-up consisting of Kavus Torabi, Fabio Golfetti, Dave Sturt, Ian East and Cheb Nettles had recorded a new album entitled Rejoice! I'm Dead!, featuring guest appearances from Steve Hillage on guitar, Didier Malherbe on duduk and Graham Clark on violin, with Daevid Allen's vocals appearing on two tracks. Rejoice! I'm Dead! was released on 16 September 2016 through Snapper Music. In May 2019, the lineup followed up with their fifteenth album The Universe Also Collapses. In 2019 the current line-up of Gong joined the Steve Hillage Band as backing musicians and as the opening act. Gong in their current form continue to tour till the present.

== Members ==
=== Current members ===
Image	Name	Years active	Instruments	Release contributions
	Fabio Golfetti	2007; 2012–present	lead guitar; vocals	Live in Brazil (2009); all releases from I See You (2014) to present
	Dave Sturt	2009–present	bass; vocals	all releases from I See You (2014) to present
	Ian East	2009–present	saxophone; flute	all releases from I See You (2014) to present
	Kavus Torabi	2014–present	vocals; guitar	all releases from I See You (2014) to present
	Cheb Nettles	2014–present	drums; percussion; vocals	all releases from Rejoice! I'm Dead! (2016) to present

=== Former members ===
Image	Name	Years active	Instruments	Release contributions
	Daevid Allen	1967–1968; 1969–1975; 1977; 1990; 1992–2001; 2003–2004; 2006–2015 (until his death)	vocals; guitar; bass; occasional keyboards	all Daevid Allen Gong releases from Haunted Chateau (1969) to Rejoice! I'm Dead! (2016), except Shamal (1976) and Live in Sherwood Forest '75 (2005)
	Gilli Smyth	1967–1968; 1969–1973; 1974; 1977; 1990; 1994–2001; 2004; 2006; 2007–2013 (died 2016)	vocals, space whisper	all releases from Haunted Chateau (1969) to You (1974) and from 25th Birthday Party (1995) to 2032 (2009), except Acid Motherhood (2004) and Live in Brazil (2009)
	Ziska Baum	1967–1968	vocals, space whisper	none
	Loren Standlee	1967–1968 (died 2014)	flute	none
	Natch Claire	1967–1968	flute	
	Daniel Laloux	1967–1968; 1969–1970	Bowed Drum, Horn, Percussion Vocals	
	Didier Malherbe	1969–1976; 1977; 1990; 1992–2001; 2006	saxophone; flute; duduk; percussion; keyboards; occasional vocals	all releases from Haunted Chateau (1969) to Live 2 Infinitea (2000); Glastonbury 1971 (2002); OK Friends (2002); Live in Sherwood Forest '75 (Shamal-Gong) (2005); Gong in the 70s (2006)
	Christian Tritsch	1969–1973	bass; guitar	all releases from Haunted Chateau (1969) to Flying Teapot (1973); Pre-Modernist Wireless: The Peel Sessions (1995); Glastonbury 1971 (2002); Gong in the 70s (2006)
	Dieter Gewissler	1969	Contrabass	Magick Brother (1970)
	Tasmin Smyth	1969	Vocals, Voices	Magick Brother (1970)
	Barre Phillips	1969	Contrabass	Magick Brother (1970)
	Earl Freeman	1969	Contrabass, Piano	Magick Brother (1970)
	Burton Greene	1969	Piano	Magick Brother (1970)
	Rachid Houari	1969–1971; 1973 (died 1977)	drums; percussion	Haunted Chateau (1969); Magick Brother (1970); Flying Teapot (1973)
	Pip Pyle	1971; 1990; 1992–1997 (died 2006)	drums; percussion	Camembert Electrique (1971); Continental Circus (1972, soundtrack); Shapeshifter (1992); 25th Birthday Party (1995)
	Laurie Allan	1972–1973; 1974	drums; percussion	Flying Teapot (1973); Glastonbury 1971 (2002)
	Mac Poole	1972 (died 2015)	drums; percussion	Gong in the 70s (2006)
	Charles Hayward	1972	drums; percussion	none
	Rob Tait	1972; 1974	drums; percussion	Gong Live Etc (1977)
	Diane Stewart	1972; 1974	vocals	Gong Live Etc (1977)
	Tim Blake	1972–1975; 1977; 1994; 2006	synthesizer; vocals	all releases from Flying Teapot (1973) to Gong Live Etc (1977); Live au Bataclan 1973 (1990); Pre-Modernist Wireless: The Peel Sessions (1995); Gong in the 70s (2006)
	Francis Moze	1972–1973	bass; piano	Flying Teapot (1973)
	Mireille Bauer	1973–1976; 1977	percussion	all releases from Angel's Egg (1973) to Gong Live Etc (1977); Live au Bataclan 1973 (1990); Live at Sheffield '74 (1990); Pre-Modernist Wireless: The Peel Sessions (1995); Live in Sherwood Forest '75(2005); Gong in the 70s (2006)
	Steve Hillage	1973–1975; 1977; 2006; 2008–2012; 2019 (guest)	lead guitar; vocals	all releases from Angel's Egg (1973) to Gong Live Etc (1977); Live au Bataclan 1973 (1990); Live at Sheffield '74 (1990); Pre-Modernist Wireless: The Peel Sessions (1995); Live in Sherwood Forest '75 (2005); Gong in the 70s (2006); 2032 (2009)
	Mike Howlett	1973–1976; 1977; 1994–2001; 2006; 2008–2009	bass; vocals	all releases from Angel's Egg (1973) to Gong Live Etc (1977) and from 25th Birthday Party (1995) to Live 2 Infinitea (2000); Live au Bataclan 1973 (1990); Live at Sheffield '74 (1990); Pre-Modernist Wireless: The Peel Sessions (1995); Live in Sherwood Forest '75 (Shamal-Gong) (2005); Gong in the 70s (2006); 2032 (2009)
	Pierre Moerlen	1973–1974; 1975–1976; 1977; 1997–1999 (died 2005)	drums; percussion	all releases from Angel's Egg (1973) to Gong Live Etc (1977); Live au Bataclan 1973 (1990); Live at Sheffield '74 (1990); Pre-Modernist Wireless: The Peel Sessions (1995); Live in Sherwood Forest '75 (2005); Gong in the 70s (2006)
	Miquette Giraudy	1974–1975; 1977; 2006; 2008–2012; 2019 (guest)	vocals; synthesizer	You (1974); Shamal (1976) (guest appearance); Gong Live Etc (1977); Live at Sheffield '74 (1990); Live in Sherwood Forest '75 (2005); 2032 (2009)
	Benoît Moerlen	1974	percussion	You (1974); Live at Sheffield '74 (1990)
	Chris Cutler	1974	drums; percussion	none
	Bill Bruford	1974	drums; percussion	none
	Brian Davison	1975 (died 2008)	drums; percussion	none
	Dave Stewart	1975	keyboards; synthesizer	none
	Patrice Lemoine	1975–1976; 1977	keyboards; synthesizer	Shamal (1976); Live in Sherwood Forest '75 (2005)
	Jorge Pinchevsky	1975–1976; 1977	violin	Shamal (1976); Live in Sherwood Forest '75 (2005)
	Sandy Colley	1976	vocals	Shamal (1976)
	Stephen Lewry	1990; 1994–1998	lead guitar	25th Birthday Party (1995)
	Paul Noble	1990	synthesizer	none
	Keith Bailey (died 2026)	1990; 1992–1994	bass; vocals	Shapeshifter (1992); OK Friends (2002)
	Graham Clark	1991–1992	violin; vocals	Shapeshifter (1992); OK Friends (2002)
	Shyamal Maïtra	1992–1994	percussion; synthesizer	Shapeshifter (1992); OK Friends (2002)
	Chris Taylor	1999–2001; 2006; 2008–2012	drums; percussion	Zero to Infinity (2000); Live 2 Infinitea (2000); 2032 (2009)
	Theo Travis	1999–2001; 2006; 2008–2010	saxophone; flute; keyboards	Zero to Infinity (2000); Live 2 Infinitea (2000); 2032 (2009)
	Mark Robson	1999–2000	synthesizer	Zero to Infinity (2000)
	Mark Hewins	1999	lead guitar	none
	Howard Scarr (Gwyo Zepix)	2000–2001	synthesizer; guitar; vocals	Live 2 Infinitea (2000) OK Friends (2002)
	Dharmawan Bradbridge	2003–2004	bass	Acid Motherhood (2004)
	Josh Pollock	2003–2004; 2007	lead guitar	Acid Motherhood (2004); Acid Mothers Gong Live Tokyo (2006); Live in Brazil (2009)
	Kawabata Makoto	2003–2004; 2007	lead guitar	Acid Motherhood (2004); Acid Mothers Gong Live Tokyo (2006)
	Cotton Casino	2003–2004; 2007	synthesizer; vocals	Acid Motherhood (2004); Acid Mothers Gong Live Tokyo (2006)
	Orlando Allen	2003–2004; 2012–2014	drums; percussion	Acid Motherhood (2004); I See You (2014)
	Tatsuya Yoshida	2004; 2007	drums; percussion	Acid Mothers Gong Live Tokyo (2006)
	Tsuyama Atsushi	2004; 2007	bass	Acid Mothers Gong Live Tokyo (2006)
	Gabriel Costa	2007	bass	Live in Brazil (2009)
	Marcelo Ringel	2007	saxophone; flute	Live in Brazil (2009)
	Fred Barley	2007	drums; percussion	Live in Brazil (2009)

== Line-ups ==
Period	Members	Studio releases
1967 – 1968	Daevid Allen – vocals, guitar; Ziska Baum – vocals; Gilli Smyth – vocals; Loren Standlee – flute	
Disbanded
1969 – 1971	Daevid Allen – vocals, guitar, bass; Gilli Smyth – vocals; Rachid Houari – drums, percussion; Didier Malherbe – saxophone, flute; Christian Tritsch – bass, guitar	Magick Brother (1970) (without Tritsch); Haunted Chateau (1969)
1971	Daevid Allen – vocals, guitar, bass; Gilli Smyth – vocals; Didier Malherbe – saxophone, flute; Christian Tritsch – bass, guitar; Pip Pyle – drums, percussion	Camembert Electrique (1971); Continental Circus (1972, soundtrack); Pre-Modernist Wireless: The Peel Sessions (1995); Glastonbury 1971 (2002); Gong in the 70s (2006)
1972	Daevid Allen – vocals, guitar, bass; Gilli Smyth – vocals; Didier Malherbe – saxophone, flute; Christian Tritsch – bass, guitar; Laurie Allan – drums, percussion	Glastonbury 1971 (2002)
1972	Daevid Allen – vocals, guitar, bass; Gilli Smyth – vocals; Didier Malherbe – saxophone, flute; Christian Tritsch – bass, guitar; Mac Poole – drums, percussion	Gong in the 70s (2006)
1972	Daevid Allen – vocals, guitar, bass; Gilli Smyth – vocals; Didier Malherbe – saxophone, flute; Christian Tritsch – bass, guitar; Charles Hayward – drums, percussion	
1972	Daevid Allen – vocals, guitar; Diane Stewart – vocals; Didier Malherbe – saxophone, flute; Christian Tritsch – guitar, bass; Tim Blake – synthesizer, vocals; Francis Moze – bass; Rob Tait – drums, percussion	
1973	Daevid Allen – vocals, guitar; Gilli Smyth – vocals; Didier Malherbe – saxophone, flute; Christian Tritsch – guitar; Tim Blake – synthesizer, vocals; Francis Moze – bass, piano; Laurie Allan – drums, percussion; Steve Hillage – guitar; Rachid Houari – percussion	Flying Teapot (1973)
1973 - 1974	Daevid Allen – vocals, guitar; Gilli Smyth – vocals; Didier Malherbe – saxophone, flute; Tim Blake – synthesizer, vocals; Steve Hillage – lead guitar; Mike Howlett – bass; Pierre Moerlen – drums, percussion; Mireille Bauer – percussion	Angel's Egg (1973); Greasy Truckers Live at Dingwalls Dance Hall (contributed one side) (1973); You (1974); Gong Live Etc (UK live album) (1977) (some tracks); Live au Bataclan 1973 (1990); Pre-Modernist Wireless: The Peel Sessions (1995); Gong in the 70s (2006)
1974	Daevid Allen – vocals, guitar; Didier Malherbe – saxophone, flute; Tim Blake – synthesizer, vocals; Steve Hillage – lead guitar; Mike Howlett – bass; Diane Stewart – vocals; Rob Tait – drums, percussion	Gong Live Etc (UK live album) (1977) (some tracks)
1974	Daevid Allen – vocals, guitar; Didier Malherbe – saxophone, flute; Tim Blake – synthesizer, vocals; Steve Hillage – lead guitar; Mike Howlett – bass; Miquette Giraudy – vocals; Pierre Moerlen – drums, percussion	Gong Live Etc (UK live album) (1977) (some tracks)
1974	Daevid Allen – vocals, guitar; Didier Malherbe – saxophone, flute; Tim Blake – synthesizer, vocals; Steve Hillage – lead guitar; Mike Howlett – bass; Miquette Giraudy – vocals; Pierre Moerlen – drums, percussion; Gilli Smyth – vocals; Additional personnel: Mireille Bauer – percussion; Benoît Moerlen – percussion	Live at Sheffield '74 (1990)
1974	Daevid Allen – vocals, guitar; Didier Malherbe – saxophone, flute; Tim Blake – synthesizer, vocals; Steve Hillage – lead guitar; Mike Howlett – bass; Miquette Giraudy – vocals; Chris Cutler – drums, percussion	
1974	Daevid Allen – vocals, guitar; Didier Malherbe – saxophone, flute; Tim Blake – synthesizer, vocals; Steve Hillage – lead guitar; Mike Howlett – bass; Miquette Giraudy – vocals; Laurie Allan – drums, percussion; Gilli Smyth – vocals	
1974	Daevid Allen – vocals, guitar; Didier Malherbe – saxophone, flute; Tim Blake – synthesizer, vocals; Steve Hillage – lead guitar; Mike Howlett – bass; Miquette Giraudy – vocals; Gilli Smyth – vocals; Bill Bruford – drums, percussion	
1975	Daevid Allen – vocals, guitar; Didier Malherbe – saxophone, flute; Tim Blake – synthesizer, vocals; Steve Hillage – lead guitar; Mike Howlett – bass; Miquette Giraudy – vocals; Gilli Smyth – vocals; Brian Davison – drums, percussion	
1975	Didier Malherbe – saxophone, flute; Steve Hillage – lead guitar, vocals; Mike Howlett – bass, vocals; Miquette Giraudy – vocals, synthesizer; Brian Davison – drums, percussion; Dave Stewart - keyboards	
1975	Didier Malherbe – saxophone, flute; Steve Hillage – lead guitar, vocals; Mike Howlett – bass, vocals; Miquette Giraudy – vocals, synthesizer; Mireille Bauer – percussion; Patrice Lemoine – keyboards; Pierre Moerlen – drums, percussion; Jorge Pinchevsky – violin	Shamal (1976) (two tracks only); Live in Sherwood Forest '75 (Shamal-Gong) (2005)
1976	Didier Malherbe – saxophone, flute; Mike Howlett – bass, vocals; Mireille Bauer – percussion; Patrice Lemoine – keyboards; Pierre Moerlen – drums, percussion; Jorge Pinchevsky – violin; Sandy Colley – vocals	Shamal (1976)
1976 – 1990	Disbanded Pierre Moerlen founded a new band, first using the name "Gong", before subsequently changing the name to "Gong-Expresso" and finally (starting from 1978) "Pierre Moerlen's Gong". The You & Shamal lineups reformed for a one-off gig in Paris on 28 May 1977. Gong next reformed for a one-off gig in April 1990 on U.K. T.V., with Allen, Smyth, Malherbe & Pyle joined by Here & Now's Stephen Lewry, Keith Bailey & Paul Noble.	
1992 - 1993	Daevid Allen – vocals, guitar; Keith Bailey – bass, vocals; Graham Clark – violin, vocals; Didier Malherbe – saxophone, flute, keyboards; Shyamal Maïtra – percussion, synthesizer; Pip Pyle – drums, percussion	Shapeshifter (1992); OK Friends (2002)
1994 – 1997	Daevid Allen – vocals, guitar; Didier Malherbe – saxophone, flute; Pip Pyle – drums, percussion; Mike Howlett – bass; Stephen Lewry – lead guitar, synthesizer; Gilli Smyth – vocals	25th Birthday Party (1995)
1997 – 1998	Daevid Allen – vocals, guitar; Didier Malherbe – saxophone, flute; Mike Howlett – bass; Stephen Lewry – lead guitar, synthesizer; Gilli Smyth – vocals; Pierre Moerlen – drums, percussion	
1999	Daevid Allen – vocals, guitar; Didier Malherbe – saxophone, flute; Mike Howlett – bass; Gilli Smyth – vocals; Mark Hewins – lead guitar; Mark Robson – synthesizer, vocals; Chris Taylor – drums, percussion; Theo Travis – saxophone, flute, keyboards	
1999 – 2000	Daevid Allen – vocals, guitar, piano; Didier Malherbe – saxophone, flute; Mike Howlett – bass; Gilli Smyth – vocals; Mark Robson – synthesizer, vocals; Chris Taylor – drums, percussion; Theo Travis – saxophone, flute, keyboards	Zero to Infinity (2000)
2000 – 2001	Daevid Allen – vocals, guitar; Didier Malherbe – saxophone, flute; Mike Howlett – bass; Gilli Smyth – vocals; Chris Taylor – drums, percussion; Theo Travis – saxophone, flute, keyboards; Howard Scarr – synthesizer, guitar, vocals	Live 2 Infinitea (2000)
Disbanded
2003 – 2004	Daevid Allen – vocals, guitar; Orlando Allen – drums, percussion; Dharmawan Bradbridge – bass; Cotton Casino – synthesizer, vocals; Kawabata Makoto – lead guitar; Josh Pollock – lead guitar	Acid Motherhood (2004) (with Acid Mothers Temple)
2004	Daevid Allen – vocals, guitar; Cotton Casino – synthesizer, vocals; Kawabata Makoto – lead guitar; Josh Pollock – lead guitar; Tsuyama Atsushi – bass; Gilli Smyth – vocals; Tatsuya Yoshida – drums, percussion	Acid Mothers Gong Live Tokyo (Acid Mothers Gong) (2006)
Disbanded
2006	Daevid Allen – vocals, guitar; Gilli Smyth – vocals; Tim Blake – synthesizer, vocals; Miquette Giraudy – synthesizer, vocals; Steve Hillage – lead guitar; Mike Howlett – bass; Didier Malherbe – saxophone, flute; Chris Taylor – drums, percussion; Theo Travis – saxophone, flute	
2007	Daevid Allen – vocals, guitar; Gilli Smyth – vocals; Tsuyama Atsushi – bass; Cotton Casino – synthesizer, vocals; Kawabata Makoto – lead guitar; Josh Pollock – lead guitar; Tatsuya Yoshida – drums, percussion	
2007	Daevid Allen – vocals, guitar; Josh Pollock – lead guitar; Fred Barley – drums, percussion; Gabriel Costa – bass; Fabio Golfetti – lead guitar; Marcelo Ringel – saxophone, flute	Live in Brazil (2009)
2008 – 2009	Daevid Allen – vocals, guitar; Miquette Giraudy – synthesizer, vocals; Steve Hillage – lead guitar; Mike Howlett – bass; Gilli Smyth – vocals; Chris Taylor – drums, percussion; Theo Travis – saxophone, flute	2032 (2009)
2009	Daevid Allen – vocals, guitar; Miquette Giraudy – synthesizer, vocals; Steve Hillage – lead guitar; Gilli Smyth – vocals; Chris Taylor – drums, percussion; Theo Travis – saxophone, flute; Dave Sturt – bass	
2010 – 2012	Daevid Allen – vocals, guitar; Miquette Giraudy – synthesizer, vocals; Steve Hillage – lead guitar; Gilli Smyth – vocals; Chris Taylor – drums, percussion; Dave Sturt – bass; Ian East – saxophone, flute	
2012 – 2013	Daevid Allen – vocals, guitar; Gilli Smyth – vocals; Dave Sturt – bass; Ian East – saxophone, flute; Orlando Allen – drums, percussion; Fabio Golfetti – lead guitar	
2013 – 2014	Daevid Allen – vocals, guitar; Dave Sturt – bass; Ian East – saxophone, flute; Orlando Allen – drums, percussion; Fabio Golfetti – lead guitar	
2014	Daevid Allen – vocals, guitar; Dave Sturt – bass; Ian East – saxophone, flute; Orlando Allen – drums, percussion, vocals; Fabio Golfetti – lead guitar; Kavus Torabi – guitar	I See You (2014)
2014 – 2015	Daevid Allen – vocals, guitar; Dave Sturt – bass; Ian East – saxophone, flute; Fabio Golfetti – lead guitar; Kavus Torabi – guitar, vocals; Cheb Nettles – drums, percussion	Rejoice! I'm Dead! (2016) (three tracks only)
2015 – present	Dave Sturt – bass, vocals; Ian East – saxophone, flute; Fabio Golfetti – lead guitar, vocals; Kavus Torabi – vocals, guitars; Cheb Nettles – drums, percussion, vocals	Rejoice! I'm Dead! (2016); The Universe Also Collapses (2019); Pulsing Signals (2022); Unending Ascending (2023)
2016 (as Steve Hillage Band)	Dave Sturt – bass, vocals; Ian East – saxophone, flute; Fabio Golfetti – lead guitar, vocals; Kavus Torabi – vocals, guitars; Cheb Nettles – drums, percussion, vocals; Steve Hillage – vocals, guitar; Miquette Giraudy – synthesizers, vocals	
