= Zero to Infinity =

Studio album by Gong
- Released: 2000
- Recorded: Sep–Oct 1999
- Genre: Progressive rock, jazz rock
- Length: 63:24
- Label: One Eyed Salmon Records, Snapper Music
- Producer: Gong, Mike Howlett

Gong chronology
Shapeshifter (1992)	Zero to Infinity (2000)	Acid Motherhood (2004)

Professional ratings
Review scores
Source	Rating
Allmusic	3.5/5 stars
progVisions	4/4 stars

Zero to Infinity (02∞) is the tenth studio album by Gong and the seventh album by the Daevid Allen version of the group, released in 2000. Like their 1992 album Shapeshifter, it continues the Gong mythology, the central part of which was formed with the Radio Gnome Trilogy of albums, comprising Flying Teapot in 1973, followed by Angel's Egg, 1973, and You in 1974.

Zero the Hero died on Shapeshifter. Zero to Infinity sees his spirit enjoying a body-free and virtual existence. During the course of this he becomes an android spheroid Zeroid. With the help of a strange animal called a gongalope, he learns that all the wisdom of the world exists within him and practices Lafta yoga and tea making. At the end he becomes one with an Invisible Temple and has much fun.

== Track listing ==
1. "Foolefare" (Allen, Travis) − 0:42
2. "Magdalene" (Allen, Howlett, Malherbe, Taylor) − 3:58
3. "The Invisible Temple" (Allen, Howlett, Malherbe, Smyth, Taylor, Travis) − 11:35
4. "Zeroid" (Allen, Howlett, Smyth) − 6:08
5. "Wise Man in Your Heart" (Allen, Howlett, Pierre Moerlen) − 8:04
6. "The Mad Monk" (Allen, Howlett, Taylor, Travis) − 3:25
7. "Yoni on Mars" (Smyth, Travis) − 6:07
8. "Damaged Man" (Allen, Howlett, Taylor, Travis) − 5:13
9. "Bodilingus "(Allen, Howlett, Taylor, Travis) − 4:03
10. "Tali's Song" (Allen) − 6:25
11. "Infinitea" (Allen, Howlett, Smyth, Taylor, Travis) − 7:48

== Personnel ==
Gong

- Daevid Allen − Guitar, Piano, Guitar (Electric), Vocals, Artwork, Electronics
- Mike Howlett − Bass, Guitar (Electric)
- Didier Malherbe − Sax (Alto), Doudouk, Bamboo Flute
- Gilli Smyth − Vocals, Space Whisper, Bird Calls
- Chris Taylor − Percussion, Drums, Cowbell
- Theo Travis − Organ, Flute, Keyboards, Sax (Soprano), Sax (Tenor), Theremin, Electronics, Drones, Loop

Guest

- Mark Robson − Keyboards, Background Vocals
