= Shapeshifter (Gong album) =

Studio album by Gong
- Released: 1992
- Recorded: Sep 1991 – Jul 1992
- Genres: Psychedelic rock; progressive rock; folk music; space rock
- Length: 66:00
- Labels: Celluloid; Lightyear
- Producers: Dino Watkyn; Nigel Gilroy

Daevid Allen's Gong chronology
| Live at Sheffield 1974 (1990) | Shapeshifter (1992) | Live on TV 1990 (1993) |

Shapeshifter is the ninth studio album released under the name Gong and the sixth album by the Daevid Allen version of the group. It was released in 1992. It is the first proper album from Daevid Allen's Gong since You from 1974. It is the first album from the original group without founding member Gilli Smyth. Didier Malherbe and Allen are the only two returning performers from the previous album. Pip Pyle, who performed on Continental Circus and Camembert Electrique also returns.

With main character Zero the hero, the album continues the Gong mythology, the central part of which was formed with the Radio Gnome Trilogy of albums, comprising Flying Teapot and Angel's Egg in 1973 and You in 1974.

In episode four in the album Shapeshifter (1992), Zero meets an urban shaman who agrees to take Zero to the next level of awareness on the proviso that Zero spends nine months on an airplane, travelling where he wants but not using money or eating anything other than airline food. Zero eventually dies in Australia under mysterious circumstances.

— Gong, Facebook

== Releases ==
Over the years since 1992, there have been different releases of the album with different numbers of tracks. On "the original as it was planned", the Gong website lists #12: "Là Bas Là Bas" and #13: "I Gotta Donkey" - these are not found on the 1997 Lightyear release. That release has a closing bonus track titled "Goddess Invocation Om Riff", recorded live at Ynys Witren at summer solstice 1992.

== Reception ==
Professional ratings
Review scores
| Source | Rating |
|---|---|
| Allmusic | 3/5 stars |

Paul Stump's 1997 History of Progressive Rock assessed that "The amalgam of trance-beats, crude sampling (dog samples for 'Dog-o-matic' et al.) and rowdy guitar splurges was among the most complete reintegration of Progressive ideology and cutting-edge contemporary music since the 1960s."

== Track listing ==
1. "Gnomerique" (Allen) − 0:07
2. "Shapeshifter" (Allen, Malherbe) − 4:53
3. "Hymnalayas" (Allen, Bailey) − 7:38
4. "Dog-o-matic" (Maitra) − 3:00
5. "Spirit With Me" (Allen, Ehrlich) − 2:27
6. "Mr Albert Parkin" (Clark) − 0:17
7. "Raindrop Tablas" (Maitra) − 0:21
8. "Give My Mother a Soul Call" (Yogananda) − 4:30
9. "Heaven's Gate" (Allen, Bailey) − 4:49
10. "Snake Tablas" (Maitra) − 0:34
11. "Loli" (Allen, Clark) − 5:09
12. "Là Bas Là Bas" (Couture, Allen) − 4:06
13. "I Gotta Donkey" (Allen) − 2:12
14. "Can: You Can" (Malherbe) − 9:09
15. "Confiture de Rhubarbier" (Pyle) − 1:18
16. "Parkin Triumphant" (Clark) − 0:06
17. "Longhaired Tablas" (Maitra) − 0:14
18. "Éléphant la Tête" (Malherbe, Maitra) − 4:41
19. "Mother's Gone" (Allen) − 1:12
20. "Éléphant la Cuisse" (Malherbe, Clark) − 3:26
21. "White Doves" (Viraj, Sunsinger) − 5:24
22. "Gnomoutro" (Allen) − 0:27

=== Bonus track ===
"Goddess Invocation Om Riff" (Live) (Allen, Blake, Hillage, Howlett, Smyth) − 12:58

== Personnel ==
- Daevid Allen: Acoustic, glissando and lewd guitarplay, vocals, midwifery
- Graham Clark: Violins, voices
- Shyamal Maitra: Tablas, ghatam, djembé, darbuka, techno percs, programming. Drums on 13
- Keith Bailey: Bass guitar, vocals: 2, 9
- Didier Malherbe: Bass, tenor, alto and soprano saxophones. WX7, keyboards, dogs, piccolo, flutes
- Pip Pyle: Drums, ten green bottles and scream

=== Guest personnel ===
- Charlelie Couture: Vocals: 12
- Tom the Poet: Instant radio poetry during US tour with Daevid: 13
- Loy Ehrlich: Keyboards: 8, Kora: 5
- Mark Robson: Keyboards and sportin' vocals: 22

=== Additional personnel on bonus track ===
In the Allmusic review of the 1997 release, additional personnel is listed:

- Mike Howlett: Bass
- Peter Kimberley: Vocals
- Steffi Sharpstrings: Guitar
- Gilli Smyth: Space Whisper, Vocals, Whistle (Human)
- Twink: Synthesizer
