= 2032 (album) =

Studio album by Gong
- Released: 21 September 2009
- Recorded: 2009
- Genre: Progressive rock, jazz rock
- Length: 75:25
- Label: G-Wave
- Producer: Steve Hillage

Gong chronology
Acid Motherhood (2004)	2032 (2009)	I See You (2014)

Professional ratings
Review scores
Source	Rating
All About Jazz	4/5 stars
AllMusic	3/5 stars
The Guardian	3/5 stars
The Skinny	1/5 stars

2032 is the twelfth studio album by Gong and the ninth album by the Daevid Allen version of the group, released on 21 September 2009.

== Overview ==
2032 is a further installment of the Gong mythology, the central part of which was formed with the Radio Gnome Trilogy of albums, comprising Flying Teapot in 1973, followed by Angel's Egg, 1973, and You in 1974.

While later Gong albums in the 1970s onwards did refer to elements of the Gong mythology, they were not seen as succeeding the Radio Gnome Trilogy in the same way as 2032.

The year 2032 is mentioned quite often in Daevid Allen's early Gong mythology writings.

The album brings together again many of the Radio Gnome Trilogy era Gong lineup, specifically Daevid Allen, Steve Hillage, Gilli Smyth, Miquette Giraudy, Mike Howlett, and Didier Malherbe.

The album describes how the heretofore invisible Planet Gong, home of the pot head pixies and octave doctors, will finally make contact with Earth in the year 2032.

The album's main themes are world peace and ecology.

== Recording ==
Recorded at A-Wave Studio in London, it was produced and mixed by Steve Hillage, with additional production by Daevid Allen at the Bananamoon Observatory in New South Wales, Australia.

== Release ==
The album is available in CD and a limited edition double LP format. The double LP comes with an LP-sized booklet with lyrics and a poster portraying the numerals 2032.

== Cover ==
The cover of the album is a stylised 0 (zero) based on artwork by Daevid Allen, referencing "Zero the Hero" of the earlier 1973-1974 Trilogy.

== Track listing ==
No.	Title	Writer(s)	Length
1.	"City of Self Fascination"	Allen	6:04
2.	"Digital Girl"	Allen, Hillage	4:22
3.	"How to Stay Alive"	Allen, Hillage, Howlett, Taylor	8:05
4.	"Escape Control Delete"	Allen, Hillage, Giraudy, Howlett	7:57
5.	"Yoni Poem"	Smyth, Giraudy	2:08
6.	"Dance with the Pixies"	Allen	4:36
7.	"Wacky Baccy Banker"	Allen, Hillage	8:20
8.	"The Year 2032"	Allen	5:38
9.	"Robo-Warriors"	Smyth, Giraudy	2:59
10.	"Guitar Zero"	Allen, Taylor	4:54
11.	"The Gris Gris Girl"	Allen, Hillage	6:29
12.	"Wave and A Particle"	Smyth, Giraudy	2:04
13.	"Pinkle Ponkle"	Allen, Hillage, Smyth	4:34
14.	"Portal"	Hillage	7:08

== Personnel ==
Gong

- Daevid Allen – voice, guitar
- Steve Hillage – guitar
- Gilli Smyth – voice, space whisper
- Miquette Giraudy – synthesisers
- Mike Howlett – bass
- Chris Taylor – drums
- Theo Travis – sax and flute

Former Gong

- Didier Malherbe – duduk, sax and flute

Additional personnel

- Yuji Katsui – electric violin
- Elliet Mackrell – violin
- Stefanie Petrik – backing vocals

== Charts ==
Chart performance for 2032
Chart (2009)	Peak position
UK Independent Albums (OCC)	38
UK Independent Album Breakers (OCC)	15
