= Banana Moon =

Studio album by Daevid Allen
- Released: July 1971
- Recorded: January and February 1971 at Marquee Studios, London
- Genre: Psychedelic rock
- Length: 37:47
- Label: BYG Actuel
- Producer: Jean Georgakarakos, Jean-Luc Young; Executive: Pierre Lattes

Daevid Allen chronology
Magick Brother (1970)	Banana Moon (1971)	Camembert Electrique (1971)

Professional ratings
Review scores
Source	Rating
Allmusic	4.5/5 stars

Banana Moon is the debut solo album by Australian singer/songwriter/guitarist and Gong leader Daevid Allen, released in July 1971 on the French BYG Actuel label. The album is sometimes referred to as Bananamoon and it was also reissued as a Gong album.

The album features Allen's former Soft Machine bandmate Robert Wyatt on drums and Archie Legget on bass, along with numerous guests including Gary Wright from Spooky Tooth, Maggie Bell from Stone the Crows and Gilli Smyth & Christian Tritsch from Gong. Guest drummer Pip Pyle would go on to join Gong soon after this recording. Some of the musicians on the album would subsequently contribute to Kevin Ayers' 1973 album Bananamour.

The song "Memories", sung by Wyatt, was initially demoed in 1967 by Soft Machine (with Allen on guitar) and later covered by Material on their 1982 album One Down, with a lead vocal by a young Whitney Houston. "Stoned Innocent Frankenstein" was re-recorded in 1977 by Allen in collaboration with Here and Now as Planet Gong on their Floating Anarchy Live 1977 album.

The original French release featured Didier Léon's painting on both the front and back of the gatefold cover, with notes and drawings by Daevid Allen on the inside surrounding a photo of the band. A BYG Actuel reissue, also from 1971, credits the album to Gong and has the band photo as the front cover. The first UK pressing, in 1975 on Virgin subsidiary Caroline Records, had an alternative cover drawn by Daevid Allen, featuring a peeled banana/moon playing a guitar.

An alternate version of the album, entitled Stoned Innocent Frankenstein, was released by GAS Records in 2014, containing "Unreleased mixes and versions. A 'Camembert Eclectique' job for Bananamoon. Stunning unreleased mixes and totally radical head-altering versions unheard for over 30 years. Robert Wyatt's drumming more obvious on a couple of the tracks is amazing. It does make you wonder whether the correct 'final' mix was sent to the pressing plant - no they wouldn't have got that wrong, would they? With an annotated and illustrated booklet."

In 2003, David Bowie included it in a list of 25 of his favourite albums, "Confessions of a Vinyl Junkie", saying that "it's possible, just possibly maybe, that strands of the embryonic glam style started here."

== Track listing ==
=== Side 1 ===
1. "It's the Time of Your Life" (Christian Tritsch) – 3:21
2. "Memories" (Hugh Hopper) – 3:37
3. "All I Want is Out of Here" (Tritsch) – 4:48
4. "Fred the Fish and the Chip On His Shoulder" (Daevid Allen) – 2:27
5. "White Neck Blooze" (Allen) – 4:38
6. "Codein Coda" (Allen) – 0:58

=== Side 2 ===
1. "Stoned Innocent Frankenstein" (Allen) – 3:28
2. "And His Adventures in the Land of Flip" (Allen, Legget, Wyatt, Fields) – 11:44
3. "I Am a Bowl" (Allen) – 2:46

== Personnel ==
- Daevid Allen – guitar and vocals
- Archie Legget – bass
- Robert Wyatt – drums, backing vocals; vocals and guitar ("Memories")

with

- Christian Tritsch – guitar and bass ("It's the Time of Your Life")
- Pip Pyle – drums ("It's the Time of Your Life")
- Gary Wright – piano ("Memories", "White Neck Blooze")
- Gerry Fields – violin ("Fred the Fish", "Adventures in The Land of Flip")
- Barry St. John, Maggie Bell – backing vocals ("White Neck Blooze")
- Gilli Smyth – space whisper ("Adventures in The Land of Flip")
- Nick Evans – trombone ("I Am a Bowl")

== Production ==
- Recorded: January & February 1971 at Marquee Studios, London
- Engineer: Phil Dunne
- Produced by: Jean Georgakarakos, Jean-Luc Young
- Executive Producer: Pierre Lattès

== Release history ==
- 1971: BYG Actuel – 45 (529 345) – France – Gatefold cover with Didier Léon painting.
- 1971: BYG Actuel – 529 345 – France – Single sleeve cover with band photograph in green. Credited to Gong.
- 1975: Caroline (Virgin) – C1512 – UK – Banana Moon cover drawn by Daevid Allen.
- 1979: Charly Records – CR 30165 – UK
- 1990: Decal – CD LIK 63 – CD – Europe
- 1995: Spalax Music – CD 14945 – CD Digipak – France
- 1999: Get Back – GET 557 – Vinyl – Italy
- 2008: Charly – SNAP238CD – CD - UK
