= Androids of Mu =

English anarcho-punk/post-punk band

- Origin: Frestonia, West London, England
- Genres: Anarcho-punk; Post-punk
- Years active: 1979-1983
- Label: F*** Off Records
- Spinoff of: Planet Gong; Here & Now
- Past members: Suze da Blooze; Corrina; Cozmic; Bess; Green Jeani

Androids of Mu were an English all-female anarcho-punk/post-punk band based in London, active from 1979 to 1983. They were part of a West London squatland scene, alongside bands such as the Poison Girls, Zounds, The Mob and The Astronauts. They played a gig at the Clarendon in Hammersmith alongside UB40 amongst others, before they went on tour.

== History ==
Emerging from associations with the hippy-orientated Here & Now, Nik Turner, Gong's Daevid Allen and Gilli Smyth, the Androids of Mu formed out of the Frestonia squatter community in Notting Hill Gate, West London, notable in its time for producing non-conformist music.

The band's driving force was vocalist Suze da Blooze (11 February 1950 – 19 August 2007). She shared lead vocals with Corrina, and wrote much of the band's material. They released one album, Blood Robots, recorded by F*** Off Records label-head Keith Dobson (Kif Kif le Batteur) in his Street Level studio.

The Androids were well received by the music press of the day. Robbi Millar in Sounds described the album as "Android genius" and likened the band to The Slits, praising their "simple songs, played with limited but adventurous ability, sung with voices that scream and holler with the mispitched intensity of early Raincoats".

From proto-punk and post-punk beginnings, the band soon became associated with the anarcho-punk scene. Crass invited the Androids to record for their label on condition that they recruited a "proper" drummer, but the band declined the invitation. Newcastle anarcho-punk band Blood Robots named themselves after Androids of Mu's only album.

In 2013, Blood Robots was re-issued on vinyl by Water Wing Records.

== Line-up ==
The band's line-up was: Suze da Blooze (vocals), Corrina (guitar, vocals), Cozmic (drums, synth, vocals) and Bess (bass, vocals). The second incarnation featured drummer Graham Cronin and guitarist Deborah Thomas.

== Discography ==
- Androids of Mu demo EP (1979, cassette, F*** Off Records)
- Blood Robots (1980, LP, F*** Off Records FLP 001)

=== Compilation/guest appearances ===
- Suze da Blooze features on Floating Anarchy Live 1977, a live album by Planet Gong (1978, Celluloid LTM 1002 [LP])
- "Bored Housewives" on Making Waves (1981, LP, Girlfriend Records)
- "Every Time I Hear the Spirit" / "Pretty Nun" / "Ride Me Easy Rider" on Slightly Weirdsville (1981, cassette, F*** Off Records)
- "Vampire Feast" on Music For Pressure (1981, cassette, F*** Off Records)
- "Cityscape" / "Jungle Beast" on Folk In Hell (1982, cassette, F*** Off Records)
- "Who Cares?" / "Atomic Explosion" / "White City" / "Seven Cities" / "Bored Housewives" / "Android Jam" on A Tribute to Bert Weedon (1982, cassette, Weird Tales)
