= Acid Mothers Gong Live Tokyo =

Live album by Gong (as "Acid Mothers Gong")
- Released: Oct 10, 2006
- Recorded: April 2004
- Genre: Progressive rock
- Label: United States of Dist.

Gong (as "Acid Mothers Gong") chronology
Live In Sherwood Forest '75 (2005)	Acid Mothers Gong Live Tokyo (2006)	Mothergong O Amsterdam (2007)

Professional ratings
Review scores
Source	Rating
Allmusic	

Acid Mothers Gong Live Tokyo is a live album by Acid Mothers Gong, a band featuring members of Gong and Acid Mothers Temple (members of which had previously been in Gong itself), recorded during April 2004 at the Doors Club in Tokyo, but not released until 2006 by Voiceprint, catalogue number VP382CD. No producer was credited, but mixing was carried out by guitarist Kawabata Makoto and drummer Yoshida Tatsuya and editing was by Daevid Allen.

== Track listing ==
1. "Gnome" – 0:40
2. "Ooom Ba Wah!" – 1:54
3. "Crazy Invisible She" – 3:45
4. "The Unkilling Of Octave Docteur DA 4J" – 9:15
5. "Avahoot Klaxon Diamond Language Ritual" – 4:52
6. "Rituel: Umbrage Demon Stirfry & Its Upcum" – 3:19
7. "Jesu Ali Om Cruci-Fiction" – 1:36
8. "Ze Teapot Zat Exploded" – 8:19 ("Flying Teapot" alternate title)
9. "Eating Colonel Saunders Upside Down" – 6:24
10. "Vital Info That Should Never Be Spoken" – 2:04
11. "Parallel Tales Of Fred Circumspex" – 5:37
12. "The Isle Of Underwear" – 12:35
13. "Ohm Riff Voltage 245" – 7:44
14. "Totalatonal Farewell To The Innocents" – 6:20

== Personnel ==
- Daevid Allen – guitar gliss, vocals/fx
- Gilli Smyth – space whisperer
- Josh Pollack – guitar, megaphone
- Kawabata Makoto – guitar, voices
- Cotton Casino – synth, voices
- Hiroshi Higashi – synth, voices
- Yoshida Tatsuya – drums, sampler
- Tsuyama Atsushi – bass, whistle, vocals
