= Flying teapot =

Flying teapot may refer to:

- Russell's teapot, a philosophical analogy coined by Bertrand Russell
- Flying Teapot (album), a 1973 album by the progressive rock band Gong
- The Stanley Steamer, a vehicle made by the Stanley Motor Carriage Company
