= Live 2 Infinitea =

Live album by Gong
- Released: November 14, 2000
- Recorded: April 6–29, 2000
- Genre: Progressive rock, psychedelic rock, space rock
- Label: Snapper
- Producer: Theo Travis

Gong live chronology
Gong est Mort, Vive Gong (1977)	Live 2 Infinitea (2000)	Floating Anarchy Live 1977 (1978)

Professional ratings
Review scores
Source	Rating
AllMusic	3/5.0 stars

Live 2 Infinitea is a live album by Gong, recorded in April 2000 during Gong's European tour.

== Track listing ==
1. "Foolefare" (Allen, Travis) – 0:46
2. "Zeroid" (Allen, Howlett, Travis) – 6:08
3. "Magdalene (Intro)" (Malherbe) – 2:15
4. "Magdalene" (Allen, Howlett, Malherbe, Travis) – 5:05
5. "Infinitea" (Allen, Howlett, Smyth, Taylor, Travis) – 3:58
6. "The Mad Monk" (Allen, Howlett, Taylor, Travis) – 3:29
7. "Zero the Hero & The Witch's Spell" (Allen, Tritsch) – 9:26
8. "Bodilingus (Intro)" (Malherbe) – 0:53
9. "Bodilingus" (Allen, Howlett, Taylor, Travis) – 5:19
10. "Inner Temple" (Allen, Malherbe) – 2:36
11. "Yoni On Mars" (Smyth, Travis) – 6:57
12. "Tropical Fish" (Allen) – 3:42
13. "Invisible Temple" (Allen, Howlett, Malherbe, Travis) – 9:07
14. "Selene" (Allen, Smyth) – 6:50

== Personnel ==
- Daevid Allen – guitar, vocals, glissando guitar
- Gilli Smyth – space whisper
- Howard Scarr – keyboards, electronics, backing vocals
- Mike Howlett – bass
- Chris Taylor – drums, backing vocals
- Didier Malherbe – flute, alto saxophone, soprano saxophone, doudouk
- Theo Travis – soprano saxophone, tenor saxophone
- Basil Brooks – additional bubbles on "Inner Temple"

=== Production ===
- Dean Barratt – mixing
- Ole-Petter Dronen − recording and mixing (Track 2, 14)
- John Bennett − recording and mixing (Track: 12, 13)
- Ben Matthews – mixing (Track: 1, 3, 11)
- John Bennett – engineer
- Denis Blackham – mastering
- Michael Heatley – liner notes
- Joss Mullinger – photography
- Recorded At – Subterania
- Recorded At – Phoenix Arts Centre, Exeter (Track 12, 13)
- Recorded At – Garage, Bergen (Track 2, 14)
