= Toby Hrycek-Robinson =

English record producer and composer

- Born: Toby Robinson; Cape Town, South Africa
- Genres: avant-garde, experimental, Krautrock
- Occupations: Composer, producer, engineer
- Years active: 1970 to present

Toby Hrycek-Robinson is a British producer, composer, and recording engineer from London, UK.

== Biography ==
Hrycek-Robinson began his career in Germany where he spent time as a sound engineer working for Karlheinz Stockhausen and Péter Eötvös in Cologne's Westdeutscher Rundfunk Studios. By the early 1970s he had moved to Dieter Dierks' studio, where he recorded with a number of krautrock bands, including work on CAN’s Landed album in 1975.

During this period he used spare studio time to experiment with visiting musicians, often working under pseudonyms such as "The Mad Twiddler" or "Genius P. Orridge". He also teamed up with Fluxus artist Robin Page, creating the mythological Pyramid label to release the tracks under names such as Cozmic Corridors and Golem. Much of this material was eventually released on the Virgin and Psi-Fi Labels from 1996.

After returning to Britain, he opened Moat Studios in London and worked with a wide range of avant garde and rock musicians including The Monochrome Set, Acid Mothers Temple, Rhys Chatham, Bellowhead, David Sylvian, and Gong. He also engineered a series of recordings with Derek Bailey from the mid-1990s until Bailey’s death in 2015.

Apart from his work with musicians, Hrycek-Robinson has composed the themes and incidental music for television, including a number of audio plays for Big Finish Productions.

== Selected discography ==
Hrycek-Robinson served as producer or engineer on the following records:

- 1975: Can – Landed (Mixing)
- 1976: Pell Mell - Rhapsody (Engineer)
- 1998: Derek Bailey – Play Backs (Engineer)
- 1998: Derek Bailey – Tohjinbo (Engineer)
- 1999: Scarlet's Well – Strange Letters (Producer)
- 2000: Union Wireless – All Her Life (Producer)
- 2000: Gong – Zero to Infinity (Engineer)
- 2001: Bows – Cassidy (Producer)
- 2001: Derek Bailey and Shoji Hano - Fish (Engineer)
- 2001: Billy Mahonie – What Becomes Before (Engineer)
- 2001: Derek Bailey – Ore (Engineer)
- 2001: Pat Thomas – Nur: Solo Piano 1999# (Mastering)
- 2002: Scarlet's Well – The Isle of the Blue Flowers (Producer)
- 2002: Derek Bailey & Franz Hautzinger – Derek Bailey / Franz Hautzinger (Engineer)
- 2002: Derek Bailey – Ballads (Engineer)
- 2003: Ivar Grydeland / HISS – Zahir (Engineer)
- 2003: Rebel Powers (Acid Mothers Temple and David Keenan) – Not One Star Will Stand the Night (Engineer)
- 2003: David Sylvian – Blemish (Engineer)
- 2006: Derek Bailey – To Play: The Blemish Sessions (Engineer)
- 2006: Joseph Holbrooke Trio – The Moat Recordings (Engineer)
- 2006: Tender Trap – Language Lessons (Producer)
- 2006: Mothers of Invasion / Makoto Kawabata – Hot Rattlesnakes (Engineer)
- 2006: Tender Trap – 6 Billion People (Producer)
- 2008: Bellowhead – Matachin (Mixing)
- 2014: Gong – I See You (Engineer)
- 2017: Can – The Singles (Mixing)
- 2020: The Monochrome Set – Little Noises 1990-1995 (Composer, Producer)
