= I See You (Gong album) =

Studio album by Gong
- Released: 10 November 2014
- Length: 62:07
- Label: Snapper
- Producer: Orlando Monday Allen

Gong chronology
2032 (2009)	I See You (2014)	Rejoice! I'm Dead! (2016)

Professional ratings
Review scores
Source	Rating
Classic Rock	3.5/5 stars

I See You is the thirteenth studio album by Gong and the tenth album by the Daevid Allen version of the group, released on 10 November 2014.

I See You is the last Gong album recorded with co-founder Daevid Allen before his death on 13 March 2015.

== Recording ==
I See You was engineered, mixed and produced by Orlando Monday Allen (Daevid Allen's son) at Flamedog Records Studios and at the Bananamoon Observatory Studios in New South Wales, Australia, with additional production by Dave Sturt and Daevid Allen.

== Release ==
The album was released on November 10, 2014, on CD and double LP. The CD version has one extra track, "Pixielation".

== Track listing ==
No.	Title	Writer(s)	Length
1.	"I See You"	Daevid Allen, Orlando Allen, Dave Sturt	3:24
2.	"Occupy"	D. Allen, Ian East, D. Sturt	2:51
3.	"When God Shakes Hands With The Devil"	D. Allen, Kavus Torabi	5:36
4.	"The Eternal Wheel Spins"	Fabio Golfetti, O. Allen	7:07
5.	"Syllabub"	D. Allen, D. Sturt, I. East	4:30
6.	"This Revolution"	D. Allen, D. Sturt, I. East	3:44
7.	"You See Me"	D. Allen, O. Allen, D. Sturt, I. East, F. Golfetti, K. Torabi	2:40
8.	"Zion My T-shirt"	D. Allen, D. Sturt	6:09
9.	"Pixielation"	I. East, D. Allen	4:43
10.	"A Brew Of Special Tea"	O. Allen	1:22
11.	"Thank You"	D. Allen	10:29
12.	"Shakti Yoni & Dingo Virgin"	D. Allen, Gilli Smyth	9:32

== Personnel ==
- Flamedog Alien – beat/crash/kick/vocal - a.k.a. Orlando Allen – drums, vocals on "The Eternal Wheel Spins"
- Unicorn Strut – bass & invisible operas - a.k.a. Dave Sturt – bass & computer samples
- Spiral K. Octoflash – crunchbox & scythe guitar - a.k.a. Kavus Torabi – neoprog smart guitar
- Fabuloso Golfcart – winged guitars/glissando - a.k.a. Fabio Golfetti – guitars, old school psych solos & glissando
- Eastwinds i.e. Windows – saxo/flutes/lungs - a.k.a. Ian East – saxs, flute
- Dada Ali – bi-focal local vocals 'n' gliss - a.k.a. Daevid Allen – gliss guitar and vocals

Special guests:

- Gilli Smyth – sprinkled space whisper

=== Production credits ===
- Engineered, mixed and produced by Orlando Monday Allen at Flamedog Records Studios and at the Bananamoon Observatory Studios in New South Wales, Australia.
- Additional production by Dave Sturt and Daevid Allen.
- Mastered by Udi Koomran at Ginger Studio, Tel Aviv (Additional production on Daevid's vocal on track 11, "Thank You").
- Rhythm section for tracks 1,2,4,7,9,11 recorded by Alex Angeloni at Mosh Studios, São Paulo, Brazil.
- All saxes and woodwinds recorded remotely by Ian East in his own studio.
- Gliss Guitar on "Shakti Yoni & Dingo Virgin" recorded by Toby Robinson at Moat Studios, London, UK.

== Charts ==
Chart performance for I See You
Chart (2014)	Peak position
UK Independent Album Breakers (OCC)	10
