= Acid Motherhood =

Studio album by Gong
- Released: 30 March 2004
- Genres: Psychedelic rock; acid rock; space rock; avant-garde music
- Length: 47:52
- Label: Mister E
- Producers: Orlando Allen and Zubin Henner

Gong chronology
Zero to Infinity (2000)	Acid Motherhood (2004)	2032 (2009)

Professional ratings
Review scores
Source	Rating
AllMusic	4.5/5 stars

Acid Motherhood is the eleventh studio album by Gong and the eighth album by the Daevid Allen version of the group, released in 2004. The line-up on this album consists of a merger of latter-day Gong, with members of University of Errors (guitarist Josh Pollock), and Acid Mothers Temple (Kawabata Makoto and Cotton Casino). It is the only Gong studio album not to include saxophone.

== Track listing ==
1. "Ocean of Molasses" (O. Allen, Bradbridge, Kawabata, Pollock) – 0:32
2. "Supercotton" (O. Allen, Kawabata, Pollock, D. Allen) – 8:36
  - Gilli Smyth – vocals
3. "Olde Fooles Game" (Sheehan, D. Allen) – 2:08
4. "Zeroina" (D. Allen, Howlett) – 2:56
5. "Brainwash Me" (Pollock, D. Allen) – 3:58
6. "Monstah!" (Pollock) – 2:31
  - Greg Sheehan – percussion
7. "Bible Study" (Das Ubuibi) – 0:30
8. "Bazuki Logix" (Kawabata) – 4:15
9. "Waving" (Pollock, D. Allen) – 4:05
10. "Makototen" (Kawabata, Pollock, O. Allen) – 13:36
11. "Schwitless in Molasses" (O. Allen, Pollock, Kawabata) – 4:36
  - Kurt Schwitters – voice

== Personnel ==
Gong

- Daevid Allen – guitar, vocals
- Kawabata Makoto – guitar, bouzouki
- Josh Pollock – guitar, drums
- Cotton Casino – synthesizer, voice
- Dharmawan Bradbridge – bass
- Orlando Allen – drums

Former and future Gong

- Gilli Smyth – space whisper (2)

Guest musicians

- Greg Sheehan – hang (3), percussion (6)
- Kurt Schwitters – voice (11)

Credits

- Orlando Allen – executive producer
- Zubin Henner – producer, engineer
- Toby Allen – cover design
