= Continental Circus (album) =

Soundtrack album by Gong
- Released: April 1972
- Recorded: April 1971 at Château d'Hérouville, Val-d'Oise, France
- Genre: Progressive rock; space rock
- Length: 34:13
- Label: Philips Records

Gong chronology
Camembert Electrique (1971)	Continental Circus (1972)	Flying Teapot (1973)

Professional ratings
Review scores
Source	Rating
Allmusic.com	3/5 stars

Continental Circus is the original soundtrack album of the 1972 French documentary film of the same name directed by Jérôme Laperrousaz. Released in April 1972 on Philips Records, the album is credited to "Gong avec Daevid Allen" and was recorded and mixed in two days in the spring of 1971, a few months before the band's 1971 album Camembert Electrique was made. Laperrousaz was a close friend and supporter of Allen and his partner Gilli Smyth and the film, starring Jack Findlay and Giacomo Agostini, is about motorcycle road racing.

The track "What Do You Want?" is the same piece as "Fohat Digs Holes in Space" on Camembert Electrique, but the version here lacks the intro, has different lyrics and is played slightly slower. The track entitled "Continental Circus World" consists of dialogue (including from New Zealand motorcyclist Keith Turner) and race sound effects from the film, backed with a looped excerpt from "Blues for Findlay", the album's only new composition.

The album features English drummer Pip Pyle who had recently joined the band, having been introduced to Daevid Allen by Robert Wyatt during the recording of Allen's debut solo album, Banana Moon, in February.

== Track listing ==
Side one
No.	Title	Writer(s)	Length
1.	"Blues for Findlay"	Daevid Allen, Jérôme Laperrousaz	11:18
2.	"Continental Circus World"	Allen, Laperrousaz	4:13

Side two
No.	Title	Writer(s)	Length
3.	"What Do You Want?"	Allen	9:04
4.	"Blues for Findlay" (instrumental)	Allen	9:38
Total length:			34:13

For legal reasons, Allen gave his writing credits on the album to his partner Gilli Smyth. He also did this for Magick Brother & a few other releases.

Various bootleg versions of the album exist on CD which include live and studio tracks from roughly the same period.

== Personnel ==
- Daevid Allen – guitar, vocals
- Gilli Smyth – space whisper
- Didier Malherbe – saxophone, flute
- Christian Tritsch – bass
- Pip Pyle – drums
