= 25th Birthday Party =

Live album by Gong
- Released: Nov 10, 1995
- Recorded: October 1994
- Genre: Psychedelic rock, alternative rock
- Length: 109:40; Disc 1: 67:45, Disc 2: 41:55
- Label: Voiceprint
- Producer: Jonny Greene, Rob Ayling

Gong live chronology
Live On T.V. (1990)	25th Birthday Party (1995)	Live Floating Anarchy 1991 (1995)

Professional ratings
Review scores
Source	Rating
Allmusic	4.5/5.0 stars

25th Birthday Party is a recording of the Gong 25th Birthday concerts in October 1994.

== Track listing ==
=== Disc one ===
1. "Thom Intro" (Thom) – 1:18
2. "Floating into a Birthday Gig" (Allen, Blake, Howlett, Lewry, Pyle, Smyth) – 5:39
3. "You Can't Kill Me" (Allen) – 6:20
4. "Radio Gnome 25" (Allen, Lewry) – 7:11
5. "I Am Your Pussy" (Allen, Smyth) – 4:56
6. "Pot Head Pixies" (Allen) – 2:54
7. "Never Glid Before" (Hillage) – 5:47
8. "Sad Street" (Hillage, Smyth) – 6:28
9. "Eat That Phonebook" (Malherbe) – 3:27
10. "Gnomic Address" (Blake) – 1:36
11. "Flute Salad" (Malherbe) – 2:32
12. "Oily Way" (Allen, Malherbe) – 3:26
13. "Outer Temple/Inner Temple" (Allen, Blake, Hillage, Malherbe) – 5:25
14. "She Is the Great Goddess" (Blake, Smyth) – 3:05
15. "Iaom Riff" (Allen, Blake, Hillage, Howlett, Smyth) – 7:34

=== Disc two ===
1. "Clouds Again" (Blake) – 9:57
2. "Tri-Cycle Gliss" (Allen, Blake, Hillage, Howlett, Smyth) – 10:51
3. "Get a Dinner" (Allen, Blake, Hillage, Howlett, Smyth) – 2:03
4. "Zero Where Are You?" (Allen, Blake, Hillage, Howlett, Smyth) – 1:29
5. "Be Who You Are My Friends" (Allen, Blake, Hillage, Howlett, Smyth) – 2:33
6. "It's the World of Illusion" (Allen, Blake, Hillage, Howlett, Smyth) – 3:00
7. "Why Don't You Try" (Allen, Blake, Hillage, Howlett, Smyth) – 2:19
8. "I Am You" (Allen, Blake, Hillage, Howlett, Smyth) – 6:37
9. "Introducing the Musicians" (Allen, Blake, Howlett, Lewry, Pyle, Smyth) – 3:03

== Personnel ==
Musicians

- Daevid Allen – vocals, guitar
- Tim Blake – synthesizer, vocals
- Mike Howlett – bass guitar
- Didier Malherbe – flute, saxophone, vocals
- Pip Pyle – drums
- Stephen Lewry – guitar, vocals
- Gilli Smyth – space whisper, vocals, whisper
- Shyamal Maitra – vocals

Production

- Daevid Allen – editing, mixing
- Bob Delvishio – photography
- Nigel Gilroy – mixing
- Peter Hartl – design
- Mike Howlett – editing, mixing
- Pierre Moerlen – composer
- Mike O'Brien – photography
- Steffy Sharpstring – editing, mixing
- Grant Showbiz – Mixing
- Chris Thorpe – editing, engineer, mixing
- Don Walker – digital editing
