= Billy Mahonie =

British post-rock band

Background information
- Origin: London, England
- Genre: Post-rock
- Years active: 1997–present
- Labels: Too Pure; Southern; Tritone Records; Oof Records; Unlabel
- Members: Gavin Baker; Howard Monk; Hywell Dinsdale; Kevin Penney
- Past members: Anthony Barratt; Duncan Brown
- Website: BM Bandcamp

Billy Mahonie is a British post-rock band. The rock quartet formed in London in 1997 with Gavin Baker (guitar), Howard Monk (drums), Hywell Dinsdale (bass and guitar) and Kevin Penney (bass). In 1999, they released their debut album The Big Dig which was followed in 2001 by What Becomes Before, in 2004 by Dust, in 2005 by Found and in 2009 by BM. In 2002, Dinsdale and Penney left the band and were replaced by Duncan Brown (bass) and Anthony Barratt (guitar).

== History ==
British instrumental rock quartet Billy Mahonie formed in London in 1997. The original line-up consisted of Gavin Baker (guitar), Howard Monk (drums), Hywell Dinsdale (bass and guitar) and Kevin Penney (bass).

Their first release was on the Fierce Panda record label, a split-single with Rothko, followed by a release on the Fierce Panda offshoot Livid Meerkat and an EP on Gold Hole Recordings.

=== The Big Dig ===
At the start of 1999, the band signed with Too Pure, who released their debut album The Big Dig produced by Head. That year they also recorded their first of two Peel Sessions, and toured Europe.

=== What Becomes Before ===
In 2000 Mahonie moved to Southern Records and recorded their second album with Toby Robinson, Harvey Birrell and Head producing. The double album What Becomes Before was released in 2001. This was followed by a second European tour. The band took a few months off in 2002 but regrouped in the autumn with a new line up of Baker and Monk joined by Duncan Brown (bass) and Anthony Barratt (guitar).

=== Dust and Found ===
A third album Dust was released on Tritone Records in 2004.

A collection of singles Found was released in 2005 on Oof Records and the band played shows in 2004, 2005 and 2006 with mixture of line-ups including all six members. They then took a break from live work. A compilation of demos, out takes and singles entitled Exhale on Mare Street came out on Unlabel in 2007 and was re-released in 2010 having been remastered with a couple of extra tracks.

=== BM ===
A fourth album BM came out in autumn 2009. This time the album was recorded by just Baker and Monk and was released on Static Caravan as a limited lathe-cut record and download. The original line-up of Baker, Dinsdale, Monk and Penney played selected shows in 2009, 2010 (Audioscope Festival) and 2014 (The End Festival). The original band reunited once more in 2017 for two shows and again in 2019, this time at Church Studios, London, where they recorded new material.

=== Field of Heads ===
Their fifth studio album, Field of Heads, was announced early in 2024, to be released on May 24 on their own newly-formed label, Whistling Sam Projects. It features the original line-up of Baker, Monk, Dinsdale and Penney, and was recorded over two long weekends either side of the Covid lockdowns. The album was preceded by a single, "Kaiju".

== Lineup ==
- Gavin Baker – guitar, bass, mandolin, banjo, organ (1997–now)
- Howard Monk – drums, percussion, telephone (1997–now)
- Hywell Dinsdale – bass, guitar, drums, harmonica, melodica (1997–2001, 2005–now)
- Kevin Penney – bass, guitar, keyboards (1997–2001, 2005–now)
- Anthony Barratt – guitar, electronics (2002–2005)
- Duncan Brown – bass (2002–2005)

== Discography ==
=== Albums ===
- 1999: The Big Dig (Too Pure)
- 2001: What Becomes Before (Southern Records)
- 2003: Dust (Tritone Records)
- 2009: BM (Static Caravan)
- 2024: Field of Heads (Whistling Sam Projects)

=== Compilations ===
- 2001: Tribute To Jet Johnson - an album of home recordings - (Day Release Records Singles Club)
- 2005: Found - singles compilation - (Oof Records)
- 2007: Exhale On Mare Street - out takes and singles compilation - (Unlabel)
- 2010: Exhale On Mare Street - remastered with extra tracks - (Unlabel)

=== Singles and EPs ===
- 1998: "Hoon" - split single with Rothko (Fierce Panda)
- 1998: "Whistling Sam" - single (Livid Meerkat)
- 1999: Little Feet - EP (Gold Hole)
- 1999: World Inaction - split EP with Jullander (Stupid Cat/Beau Rivage)
- 1999: Come On Billy Mahonie Give It Your Best Shot - 3 cd single set (Too Pure)
- 1999: One Thousand Years of Billy Mahonie - remix EP with Bows & Hefner (Too Pure)
- 2000: "Rot Of The Stars" - split single with Seafood (Jonathan Whiskey)
- 2000: "Flume" - single (Speakerphone Recordings)
- 2004: Nightmare City - download EP (BM Recordings)
- 2006: "New Year's Eve Song" - split single with The Jesus Years (Theory of Nothing)
- 2006: Watching People Speaking - EP (Euphrate Records)
- 2007: "Nightmare City" - single (Euphrate Records)
- 2024: "Kaiju" (Whistling Sam Projects)
