= Camembert Electrique =

Studio album by Gong
- Released: October 1971
- Recorded: June to September 1971 at Château d'Hérouville, Val-d'Oise, France
- Genre: Progressive rock; psychedelic rock; space rock; proto-punk
- Length: 39:36
- Label: BYG Actuel
- Producer: Pierre Lattès

Gong chronology
Magick Brother (1970)	Camembert Electrique (1971)	Continental Circus (1972)

Professional ratings
Review scores
Source	Rating
Allmusic	4.5/5 stars

Camembert Electrique (French: Electric Camembert) is the second studio album by the progressive rock band Gong, recorded and originally released in 1971 on the French BYG Actuel label. The album was recorded at Château d'Hérouville near Paris, France, produced by Pierre Lattès and engineered by Gilles Salle. Jean Karakos (credited in Daevid Allen's liner notes as "Byg Jean Kastro Kornflakes") was executive producer.

== Release history ==
The album was originally released in France in October 1971 on BYG Actuel (catalogue number 529.353), and reissued in the UK in 1974 by Virgin Records (catalogue number VC-502), where it sold for 59p, the price of a single, a marketing scheme Virgin had used the year before for the album The Faust Tapes by Faust, in the hope that greatly discounted albums would give more exposure to the artists and encourage sales of their regularly priced albums, although these discounted albums did not qualify for album chart listings. It was also issued twice on Virgin's Caroline Records budget label (catalogue number C-1505 also in 1974, and C-1520 around 1976), still at a discount price, but no longer priced as low as a single. In the late 1970s it was reissued on Charly Records whose edition was in print in the UK concurrently with Virgin's. More recently it has been reissued in the UK on CD by Snapper Music (catalogue number SNAP-009) and on 180-gram vinyl by Get Back Records (catalogue number GET-610).

== Track listing ==
Side one
No.	Title	Writer(s)	Length
1.	"Radio Gnome"	Daevid Allen	0:26
2.	"You Can't Kill Me"	Allen	6:23
3.	"I've Bin Stone Before / Mister Long Shanks / O Mother"	Allen	4:53
4.	"I Am Your Fantasy"	Christian Tritsch, Gilli Smyth	3:41
5.	"Dynamite / I Am Your Animal"	Tritsch, Smyth	4:32
6.	"Wet Cheese Delirium"	Allen	0:29

Side two
No.	Title	Writer(s)	Length
7.	"Squeezing Sponges Over Policemen's Heads"	Allen	0:13
8.	"Fohat Digs Holes in Space"	Allen, Smyth	6:24
9.	"And You Tried So Hard"	Tritsch, Allen	4:39
10.	"Tropical Fish / Selene"	Allen	7:36
11.	"Gnome the Second"	Allen	0:26
Total length:			39:36

Track 1 is titled "Radio Gnome Prediction" on Virgin editions and "Radio Gnome" on later CD editions to avoid confusion with the later song titled "Radio Gnome Invisible", released in 1973 on the Flying Teapot album. Similarly, Gong recorded a completely different song titled "Selene" on the Angel's Egg album. Also, "Wet Cheese Delirium" is misspelled "Delirum", and "And You Tried So Hard" is shortened to "Tried So Hard" on some recent editions.

The first and last tracks on each side of the original LP are short collages of sound effects. On both sides of the LP the audio begins in the widely spaced lead groove (on the original edition, but appearing as a banded track on most later editions), and at the end of the side, the audio continues into the locked groove.

== Personnel ==
- Daevid Allen ("Bert Camembert") – guitar (all but 9), vocals, bass (9)
- Gilli Smyth ("Shakti Yoni") – space whisper
- Didier Malherbe ("Bloomdido Bad De Grasse") – saxophones, flute
- Christian Tritsch ("Submarine Captain") – bass (all but 9), guitar (9)
- Pip Pyle – drums

with

- Eddy Louiss – Hammond organ and piano on 3
- Konstantin Simonovitch – phased piano on 5

Also listed among the personnel are "Venux De Luxe" (Francis Linon), the band's live sound engineer, as "switch doctor and mix master". Robert Wyatt's son Sam is also pictured with the band.
