= Here & Now (band) =

English psychedelic/space rock band

Here and Now
- Also known as: Planet Gong, Ici Maintenants
- Origin: London, England
- Genres: psychedelic, space rock
- Years active: 1974–1986, 1988–2026
- Labels: Charly, Deptford Fun City, Chick, Landslide, Cold Harbour
- Past members: see "Band members" below
- Website: https://planetgong.co.uk

Here & Now were a psychedelic and space rock group originated in 1974 as a loose collective playing improvised music from the London squat scene around Latimer Road. By 1976 they had evolved as a four-piece consisting of Keith Dobson (drums), Paul Noble (synthesiser). Keith Bailey (bass) and Stephan Lewry (guitar).

They were picked-up as collaborators by former Gong frontman Daevid Allen to tour and record at the end of 1977 as Planet Gong, producing the album Live Floating Anarchy 1977, with Gavin Allardyce replacing Noble.

They recorded their debut studio album Give and Take in 1978 and were noted as being active on the free festival scene, even touring without charging an entrance fee. Bailey and Allardyce continued the group with changing personnel up to 1986 releasing several studio (Fantasy Shift and Theatre) and live (All Over the Show and Been and Gone) albums.

They would reform near the end of the decade primarily for live appearances including collaborating once again with Allen in 1991, also recording the studio EP "Standing for Ever" (1989) and album UFOasis (1993). Various incarnations of the group have appeared consisting of new and returning old members up to Bailey's death in 2026.

== History ==
=== 1974-1976: Formation ===
The origins of the group began in the West London squat scene at Latimer Road, where a loose group of musicians gathered to play for free and at festivals, such as Windsor Festival in 1974. Their original name Here Now reflected the group being composed of whoever were there and then, but also inspired by Baba Ram Dass's book Be Here Now. Drummer Keith Dobson (known as Kif Kif le Batteur) and guitarist José Gross evolved from this collective as Here and Now, and were joined by Paul Noble (known as Twink, on home-made synthesiser) and others including Richard Heley.

An appearance at the 1975 Watchfield Free Festival saw them pick up bass player Keith Bailey (known as Keith da Missile Bass). At the festival they encountered guitarst Stephan Lewry (known as Steffe Sharpstrings), who was pulled into the group's line-up replacing Alan Dogend. Bailey remembers the occasion as "we played and played all night – didn’t stop til sunrise", having an out-of-body experience and being joined onstage by Arthur Brown and Rebop Kwaku Baah.

=== 1976-1979: Incarnation ===
The four-piece of Dobson, Noble, Bailey and Lewry spent the 1976/7 Winter touring France in an old bus, also recording a radio session part of which would later be issued on Gospel of Free. Former Steve Hillage roadie Grant Cunliffe (known as Grant Showbiz because of his industry connections) became the group's audio engineer and road manager, while Noble left to be replaced by Gavin Allardyce (known as Gavin da Blitz), Susan Allport and Ano Graver (known as Suze da Blooze and Annie Wombat respectively) joined as backing singers.

They were brought to the attention of former Gong frontman Daevid Allen, who had spent the last few years living in Deià, Majorca with his partner Gilli Smyth and their children, producing solo albums for Jean Luc Young's Charly Records. Allen, seeking musicians for a "space-punk" incarnation of Gong, guested at a gig at Oxford Polytechnic. The union was deemed successful and they adopted the name Planet Gong. They toured UK and France at the end of 1977 producing the album Live Floating Anarchy 1977, which included the studio single "Opium for the People". A further tour was scheduled for Spring 1978, but Allen soon dropped out and the group reverted to the Here and Now name.

They signed a deal with Charly and recorded the album Give and Take at Foel Studios with studio owner Dave Anderson producing. The sessions also produced extra material issued as the 7" EP Dog in Hell. The group toured Britain, but wanting to distance themselves from the commerce and business of the industry, adopted a policy of no entry fee with a collection from the audience at the end. The Fall were a regular opening act, but Mark E. Smith asked "How can it work for anybody? How can you work for nothing? I think people should pay for what they get. We do this because we like Here and Now, that's all". The group also toured with Alternative TV producing the joint live album What You See... Is What You Are for Illegal Records subsidiary Deptford Fun City, on which they were augmented by saxophonist Jack Neat. John Peel encountered the group playing at Meanwhile Gardens leading to a session recorded at Maida Vale Studios on 8 November and broadcast on BBC Radio 1 on 16 November.

Allport had given birth to a daughter while on tour, and she and her partner Dobson tired of travailing and quit, Allport sang with Androids of Mu and Dobson fronted 1980s post-punk bands The 012 and World Domination Enterprises. Rob Bougie came in as Dobson's replacement, while Graver left awhile later as she had become involved with Mark Perry having their child. The group were further changed by the addition of second guitarist Bernie Elliott, and this configuration continued touring Britain and Europe, producing a live album of new compositions called All Over the Show from August 1979, and the studio single "End of the Beginning".

=== 1980-1986: Continuation ===
Further personnel changes would be made at the beginning of the 1980s, first Elliot was replaced by Dean Gaisburgh-Watkyn (known as Dino Ferrari), then Cunliffe went on to work in sound and recording for the likes of Alternative TV, The Fall and later The Smiths. Lewry was replaced by Gary Maughan, and this line-up produced the Stolen Moments self-released cassette tape of demos, but he soon departed. The 1982 album Fantasy Shift was recorded with Trevor Evan Jones at Studio One in Slough for Chick records, and featured a guest appearance ffom Lewry. Drummer Bougie was replaced by Rob Peters after it was recorded but before its release, but he was replaced soon after by Paul Rose.

The six track 1985 mini album Theatre was recorded with Dave Goodman at Wickham Studios for Landslide Records. The group decided to call it a day and chose to bow out with the live album Been and Gone recorded at Dingwalls on 31 January 1986, issued by Cold Harbour Records and also on video by Jettisoundz.

=== 1988-2026: Reformation ===
The group's dissolution did not last long, with Bailey, Allardyce and Gaisburgh-Watkyn re-uniting with new drummer Pete Davies from UK Subs. A three track 12" EP "Standing Forever" was recorded at Falconer Studios with Nigel Gilroy and issued by Scratch Records via Probe Plus in 1989. Allardyce left the band and music industry in 1990 and died on 17 January 2018.

Allen had returned to his native Australia at the beginning of the 1980s, but in 1988 returned to Britain to start recording and performing as Gomgmaison. Bailey was involved in managing the venture, but was soon pulled into the group, and would also pull in Lewry and Noble for the late-night ITV Central hour-long in-concert 1990 television series Bedrock (commercially released as Live On T.V. in 1993).

Bailey and Lewry formed a new Here and Now with Andy Roid on keyboards and Nick Danger on drums, while Gaisburgh-Watkyn switched to sound-crew (as of 2026 he was perfroming for William D. Drake). They toured Britain backing Allen as Planet Gong, producing the album Live Floating Anarchy 1991. Bailey contributed to the recording of Gong's Shapeshifter album in Paris in 1992, and Lewry performed at Gong's 25th Birthday Party in Hillage's absence in October 1994 at The Forum, London.

Bailey, Lewry and Roid were joined by drummer Steve Cassidy for 1993's UFOasis recorded at Greenhouse Studios, London.

Dobson, Lewry and Noble occasionally performed as Ici Maintenants from 2001 onwards, with Tim Flattus on bass, releasing the live album Space and Time. The trio re-united with Bailey and Cunliffe for a performance at Allport's 2007 funeral, a recording of which was issued as Wild and Free on Dobson's Free Love records. Dobson died in July 2025,

Bailey and Cassidy were continuing the group with Mark Robson (Keyboards) and Tom Ashurst (Guitar) working on a new album in 2024. It was reported that Bailey died in August 2026 after an 18 month battle with cancer.

== Band members ==
- Kif Kif Le Batteur (Keith Dobson) – drums/vocals (1974–1978) + ~
- José Gross – guitar/keyboards (1974–1975) ^ +
- Chris Kelleher – violin (1974–1975) ^
- Franco – bass (1974)
- Marguerita – vocals (1974)
- Drucilla – ? (1974)
- Joleon Buchanan – guitar (1974–1975)
- Nick Reiter – bass (1974–1975) ^
- Richard Heley – vocals (1974–1975) ^
- Hugh – flute (1974–1975)
- Twink (Paul Noble) – keyboards (1974–1977) ~
- Alan Dogend – ? (1974–1975) +
- Steffe Sharpstrings (Stephan Lewry) – guitar/vocals (1975–1981, 1992–2009) ~
- Keith Tha Missile Bass (Keith Bailey) – bass/vocals (1975–1976, 1976–2025 )
- Max Cann – bass (1976)
- Suze Da Blooze (Susan Allport) – dancing/vocals (1976–1979)
- Gavin Da Blitz (Gavin Allardyce) – keyboards/vocals (1977–1990)
- Ano Wombat (Ano Graver) – dancing/vocals (1977–1979)
- Jack The Sax (Jack Neat) – saxophone (1978)
- Rob Bougie – drums (1979–1982)
- Bernie Elliott – guitar (1979–1980)
- Deano Ferrari (Dean Gaisburgh-Watkyn) – guitar/vocals (1981–1992)
- Rob Peters – drums (1982–1983)
- Paul Rose – drums (1983–1986)
- Pete Davis – drums (1986–1991)
- J.C. (Jonathan Lambert) – saxophone (1986–1989)
- Dominic Luckman – drums (1991)
- Nick Danger – drums (1991)
- Andy Roid – keyboards/vocals (1991–1997, 2011–2019)
- Steve Cassidy – drums (1991–2007, 2021-)
- Joie Hinton – keyboards (2003–2009)
- Merv Pepler – drums (2007–2009)
- Slim Verhoef – guitar (2009–2017)
- Gwyo Ze Pix (Howard Scarr) – keyboards (2009–2010)
- Nik Nimbus – drums (2009–2013)
- Mark Robson – keyboards/vocals (2011– )
- Stephen 'Woody' Wood – drums (2013–2017)
- Andy Burrows – guitar/vocals (2017–2020 )
- Gem Quinn – drums/vocals (2017–2020 )
- Tom Ashurst - guitar/vocals (2021- )

^ formed Blank Space in 1975; + formed The 012 in 1979; ~ formed Ici Maintenants 2001-2007

== Discography ==
=== Contemporary albums ===
- Live Floating Anarchy 1977 (1978, Charly) live, as Planet Gong with Daevid Allen and Gilli Smyth
- Give and Take (1978, Charly)
- What You See... Is What You Are (1979, Deptford Fun City) live, one side Here & Now, other side Alternative TV
- All Over the Show (1980, Charly) live
- Fantasy Shift (1983, Chick)
- Theatre (1985, Landslide)
- Been & Gone (1986, Cold Harbour) live, also on video (Jettisoundz)
- Live Floating Anarchy 1991 (1992, GAS) live, as Planet Gong with Allen
- UFOasis (1993, Nowhere)

=== EPs and singles ===
- "Opium for the People" / "Poet For Sale" (1978, Charly) 7" A-side Planet Gong; B-side Allen
- "Dog in Hell" / "Floating Anarchy Radio"; "Addicted" (1978, Charly) 7" EP
- "End of the Beginning" / "Choke a Koala" (1980, Charly) 7" single
- "Standing Forever" / "Slam Bam Wham"; "Squeezing the Tube" (1989, Scratch) 12" EP

=== Limited release albums ===
- Off The Cuff (1980, cassette) live 1979
- Stolen Moments (1981, cassette) 1980 demos
- Coaxed out from Oxford (1984, cassette, CD in 2009) live 1984
- Space and Time (2003, Fluffy) live 2001/2003, as Ici Maintenants
- Wild and Free (2007, Free Love) live, re-union of 1976 line-up

=== Archive albums ===
- Gospel of Free (1999, GAS) live, rehearsal and radio session 1976 to 1978
- Bristol Gardens (Free Love) live 1977
- Rivington Pike (Free Love) live 1977
- Rivington Pike 2 (Free Love) live 1977
- Oxford Poly (Free Love) live 1977 with Daevid Allen
- Live in London (2013) live at Dingwalls 2007
