= Zorch =

Formed in 1973 in north London, Zorch pioneered integrated performances of synthesizers and lightshow. Originally a four-piece, by 1975 they were performing as a duo: Basil Brooks and Gwyo Zepix played three monophonic EMS analogue synthesizers, but were augmented by Silver (dance) and a full-on psychedelic light show, provided by John Andrews under the name of 'Acidica'. At times reminiscent of Tim Blake as well as Tonto's Expanding Head Band, their repetitive melodies, extended improvisation and thumping sequenced bass created a unique musical style that anticipated techno and trance. In the days before polyphonic synthesizers and personal computers, they filled out the sound using two reel-to-reel tape machines as a delay line.

The duo played at a number of 1970s free festivals including Windsor in 1974, Meigan Fayre in 1975 and Stonehenge Festival in 1974 and 1975. Zorch were the only band to record in Peter Zinovieff's EMS studio in Putney — in 1975 they used the EMS Synthi 100 to record the "Ouroboros" Suite, recently remastered for CD. Some of this music was used as the soundtrack for the short film Mother Earth with synthetic visuals from the EMS Spectron Video Synthesizer.

Zorch split up in 1976. Brooks joined the Steve Hillage Band and provided the live sound effects for The Hitchhiker's Guide to the Galaxy stage shows. Gwyo Zepix joined Bristol jazzrock band Skywhale before moving to Germany in 1979. He returned to the UK in 2000 to join Gong on keyboards and guitar. Zorch also reformed at this time, and have since played a few UK gigs including The Garage with Daevid Allen on guitar, and Hackney Empire supporting Gong. In 2001, they played at the Assembly Rooms in Glastonbury, and recorded a live album of this event (Glastonbury Live).

More recently, Zorch took part in the three-day 2006 Gong Unconvention at the Melkweg, Amsterdam, where Basil Brooks also took part in the Steve Hillage Band set with Hillage, Miquette Giraudy, Mike Howlett, and Chris Taylor.
