= Live in Brazil: 20 November 2007 =

Gong Global Family – Live in Brazil 2007

Live album by Gong
- Released: 21 September 2009
- Recorded: live in São Paulo, Brazil at the SESI Theatre, 20 November 2007
- Genres: Psychedelic rock, space rock
- Length: 63:52
- Label: Voiceprint

Gong chronology
Mothergong O Amsterdam (2007)	Gong Global Family – Live in Brazil 2007 (2009)

Professional ratings
Review scores
Source	Rating
Allmusic	3.5/5 stars
DPRP	(7/10)

Gong Global Family – Live in Brazil 2007 is a live album and DVD by the psychedelic rock band Gong in their Global Family format, recorded on 20 November 2007 at the SESI theatre in São Paulo, but not released until 2009 by Voiceprint, catalogue number VP520CD. No producer was credited, but mixing and mastering were carried out by guitarist Fabio Golfetti and video editing and DVD were by Flavio Tsutsumi.

== Track listing ==
1. "You Can't Kill Me" [DVD] – 6:39
2. "Radio Gnome Invisible" [DVD] – 8:23
3. "Fohat Digs Holes in Space" [DVD] – 11:15
4. "Oily Way" [DVD] – 3:25
5. "Outer Temple" [DVD] – 2:12
6. "Inner Temple" [DVD] – 2:07
7. "Master Builder" [DVD] – 8:07
8. "Tropical Fish" [DVD] – 6:16
9. "Selene" [DVD] – 7:05
10. "Dynamite" [DVD] – 8:23

== Personnel ==
Musicians

- Daevid Allen – guitar, vocals
- Fred Barley – drums
- Gabriel Costa – bass
- Fabio Golfetti – guitar
- Josh Pollock – guitar, megaphone
- Marcelo Ringel – saxophone

Production

- Paulo Bira – engineer
- Michael Clare – inside photo
- Fabio Golfetti – mastering, mixing
- Fernando Lopes – live sound technician
- Angelo Pastorello – cover photo, inside photo
- Flavio Tsutsumi – cameraman, video editor
- Julio Bruscalin, Mariana De Cicco, Ricardo Palomares, Tati Mello – cameraman
