= You (Gong album) =

Studio album by Gong
- Released: 4 October 1974
- Recorded: Summer 1974
- Studios: The Manor, Shipton-on-Cherwell, UK
- Genres: Progressive rock; jazz rock; psychedelic rock; space rock
- Length: 44:38
- Label: Virgin
- Producers: Simon Heyworth and Gong

Gong chronology
Angel's Egg (1973)	You (1974)	Shamal (1976)

Daevid Allen's Gong chronology
Angel's Egg (1973)	You (1974)	Shapeshifter (1992)

Professional ratings
Review scores
Source	Rating
Allmusic	4.5/5 stars

You is the fifth studio album by the progressive rock band Gong, released by Virgin Records in October 1974. It is the last album by Daevid Allen's iteration of the group until 1992's Shapeshifter. Recorded at Virgin's Manor Studios in Oxfordshire, England, side 1 was mixed at Pye Studios, Marble Arch, London, while side 2 was mixed at The Manor. It was produced by Simon Heyworth and Gong "under the universal influence of C.O.I.T., the Compagnie d'Opera Invisible de Thibet", and also engineered by Heyworth.

You is the third of the "Radio Gnome Invisible" trilogy of albums, following Flying Teapot and Angel's Egg. The trilogy forms a central part of the Gong mythology. The structure of the album mixes short narrative pieces with long, jazzy instrumentals (such as "Master Builder", "A Sprinkling of Clouds" and "Isle of Everywhere"), building to a climax/conclusion with "You Never Blow Yr Trip Forever".

== Preparation and recording ==
The group had undertaken a gruelling tour from October 1973 through to May 1974 taking in Britain, France, Germany and Netherlands. As the tour progressed, they would compose and improvise new themes as a group for this album, subsequently all pieces are credited to the entire band under the pseudonym COIT (Compagnie d'Opera Invisible de Thibet). Allen felt "[t]here was a mystical, occult agreement between us: on the You album, we managed to create geometrically and mathematically perfect pieces of music that seemed to be totally improvised".

In June 1974, with the same line-up as the previous Angel's Egg album, they entered Virgin Records' Manor Studios to record this album. On 29 June they performed for free in Hyde Park, London. (Note: Later included as a bonus disk on the 2019 Virgin remaster, and as London - Hyde Park Live, 28th June 1974 as part of the Love From The Planet Gong (The Virgin Years 1973-75) boxed-set (Virgin, 675 890-1, 2019).)

During the sessions, they recorded the non-album single "Where Have All the Flowers Gone?", although it was unissued at the time it was subsequently included on the Gong Live Etc. 1977 collection. It was also re-recorded with altered lyrics as "Hours Gone" by Allen and New York Gong on the 1980 album About Time.

== Touring and promotion ==
The group toured extensively from 7 August 1974 visiting Britain, France, Germany, Netherlands, Belgium and Norway finishing on 10 September 1975 at The Marquee. (Note: The Marquee shows were recorded, and part released on Gong Live Etc. and the full set including performances of Hillage's Fish Rising on Love From The Planet Gong (The Virgin Years 1973-75)) There was a bewildering turn-over of personnel: Gilli Smyth (vocals) left before the tour began, her position taken up by Miquette Giraudy, the partner of Steve Hillage (guitar); Pierre Moerlen (drums) also left before the tour commenced, returning once again to Les Percussions de Strasbourg, the position being taken up variously by Chris Cutler (August and September), Laurie Allan for his third stint (September to November), (Note: Allan's departure was enforced due to being caught in possession of drugs crossing the border from France into Germany, barring his return to France for three years) Bill Bruford (November and December), Brian Davison (February to June) and back to Moerlen again (August onward) after he accepted Virgin's offer to lead the group.

Tim Blake (synthesisers) was forced out in March 1975 after Daevid Allen (vocals and guitar) had long-campaigned for his departure because he perceived Blake's drug use was making him violent and psychotic, while Allen himself left in April when he felt an "invisible force" prevented his getting on stage at Cheltenham Town Hall on 10 April. (Note: "I couldn't actually go on. There was an empty doorway that I couldn't go through because I was bouncing off thin air. I'm a restless spirit – I always jump out when things get too successful.") Dave Stewart (keyboards) appeared at some concerts in June, his position then being taken up by Patrice Lemoine.

During September the group began working on material for their next album Shamal, which Hillage only took a guest role on, signalling that he would leave at the end of the year as he felt that much the group's purpose had gone with Allen's departure. (Note: "Without Daevid, it didn't really feel like Gong, Some over-enthusiastic Virgin press guy started to do this 'Steve Hillage: new leader' number. I felt really awkward about that, especially as I'd just come out with my solo album, Fish Rising. It looked like I'd elbowed Daevid so I could have a vehicle which was absolutely not the case.") Only Didier Malherbe (saxophone) and Mike Howlett (bass) remained ever-present throughout the year.

== Release ==
It was first released by Virgin on 4 October 1974 (catalogue V2019). Further re-pressings were made including as part of a re-issue programme in 1981 (catalogue OVED16). Virgin released the first CD version in 1990 (catalogue CDV2019), including a bonus track of an alternate version of "A PHP's Advice". A re-mastered CD was compiled in 2019 by Howlett and Hillage including further bonus tracks of "Where Have All the Flowers Gone?" and live performances from the Hyde Park concert (catalogue 7714152).

However, former BYG founder Jean-Luc Young began releasing the album on Charly Records in 1982 (catalogue CR30220), followed by releases on related labels such as Decal (catalogue CDLIK76) and Spalax Music (catalogue 14834).

== Music ==
The album's music has been characterized as "far-out jazz-prog shit."

== Reception and influence ==
In a retrospective review for AllMusic, Rovi Staff assessed the album as "a more sophisticated musical vision that owed as much to jazz-rock fusion as to fellow space rockers... this is Gong's most "spacy" album, full of extended, ethereal passages that would inspire future generations of space rockers. The sound was equally defined however, by the jazzy flights of saxophonist Didier Malherbe and the sinuous rhythms of bassist Mike Howlett and drummer Pierre Moerlen".

Rolling Stone named You one of its "50 Greatest Prog Rock Albums Of All Time".

In 1997 the recordings were subject to remixes by a variety of artists and issued as You Remixed (Gliss Records catalogue glisscd001 in Europe, Hypnotic Records catalogue CLP0118-2 in North America). Remixes include those by Moodswings, The Orb, The Shamen, Youth, Electric Skychurch, Total Eclipse, System 7, Stephen Budd, Yamataka Eye, Doof and Graham Massey.

Lead guitarist Steve Hillage remade "Master Builder" as "The Glorious Om Riff" on his 1978 album Green.

Japanese psych-rock band Acid Mothers Temple also frequently cover "Master Builder", entitled "Om Riff", and have released 2 full albums dedicated to album-length renditions of the song: 2005's "IAO Chant From The Cosmic Inferno" and 2012's "IAO Chant From The Melting Paraiso Underground Freak Out".

In 2020, Vlad Nichols of Ultimate Guitar wrote: "Straight off the bat, Gong established themselves as a connoisseur's band within a connoisseur's subgenre."

== Track listing ==
Side one
No.	Title	Writer(s)	Length
1.	"Thoughts for Naught" (listed as "Thought for Naught" on original LP sleeve)	Daevid Allen, Tim Blake, Steve Hillage, Mike Howlett, Didier Malherbe, Pierre Moerlen	1:32
2.	"A P.H.P.'s advice"	Allen, Blake, Hillage, Howlett, Malherbe, P. Moerlen	1:47
3.	"Magick Mother Invocation"	Allen, Blake, Hillage, Howlett, Malherbe, P. Moerlen, Mireille Bauer, Miquette Giraudy, Benoit Moerlen, Gilli Smyth	2:06
4.	"Master Builder"	Allen, Blake, Hillage, Howlett, Malherbe, P. Moerlen, B. Moerlen, Bauer, Giraudy, Smyth	6:07
5.	"A Sprinkling of Clouds"	Allen, Blake, Hillage, Howlett, Malherbe, P. Moerlen	8:55

Side two
No.	Title	Writer(s)	Length
6.	"Perfect Mystery" (listed as "Perfect Mistery" on original LP sleeve)	Allen, Blake, Hillage, Howlett, Malherbe, P. Moerlen	2:29
7.	"The Isle of Everywhere"	Allen, Blake, Hillage, Howlett, Malherbe, P. Moerlen	10:20
8.	"You Never Blow Yr Trip Forever"	Allen, Blake, Hillage, Howlett, Malherbe, P. Moerlen, B. Moerlen, Bauer, Giraudy, Smyth	11:22
Total length:			44:38

== Personnel ==
Gong

- Daevid Allen ("Dingo Virgin") – gliss guitar, vocals ("vocal locust and glissandoz guitar")
- Gilli Smyth ("Shakti Yoni") – vocals ("poems and space whisper")
- Didier Malherbe ("Bloomdido Bad de Grasse") – wind instruments and vocals
- Tim Blake ("Hi T Moonweed") – Moog, EMS synthesizer, Mellotron
- Miquette Giraudy ("Bambaloni Yoni") – vocals ("wee voices and chourousings")
- Steve Hillage – lead guitar
- Mike Howlett – bass guitar
- Pierre Moerlen – drums, percussion
- Mireille Bauer – pitched percussion
- Benoit Moerlen – pitched percussion

Also credited

- "Venux De Luxe" (Francis Linon) – Switch Doctor and stage sound
- Wizz De Kidd – lighting
- David ID – road management
