= Live Floating Anarchy 1977 =

Live album by Planet Gong
- Released: April 1978
- Recorded: 6 November 1977
- Venue: Bananamoon Observatory Studio, Toulouse
- Studio: Studios Ferber, Paris
- Length: 42:39
- Label: LTM/Charly Records

Gong chronology
Gong Live Etc (1977)	Live Floating Anarchy 1977 (1978)	About Time (1980)

Professional ratings
Review scores
Source	Rating
AllMusic	3/5 stars

Live Floating Anarchy 1977 is a 1978 live album by Planet Gong, a combination of Gong's Daevid Allen and Gilli Smyth and the band Here & Now. It was recorded in Toulouse on 6 November 1977, apart from the track "Opium for the People" which was a studio recording. It was originally released on the French LTM record label, run by Jean Karakos, who had previously run Tapioca and BYG.

== Track listing ==
All tracks are written by Daevid Allen.

Side 1
No.	Title	Length
1.	"Psychological Overture"	2:36
2.	"Floating Anarchy"	5:15
3.	"Stoned Innocent Frankenstein"	3:18
4.	"New Age Transformation Try: No More Sages"	12:10

Side 2
No.	Title	Length
1.	"Opium for the People"	4:25
2.	"Allez Ali Baba Black Sheep Have you Any Bullshit: Mama Maya Mantram"	15:01

== Personnel ==
- Prof. Steffy Sharpstrings P.A. (Stephan Lewry) – guitar, lips, glissando guitar, vocal on track 2
- Keith da Missile Bass (Keith Bailey) – bass guitar and tree trunk
- Kif Kif Le Batteur (Keith Dobson) – drums and asides besides
- Gavin Da Blitz (Gavin Allardyce) – synthesizer and pinball flip
- Suze Da Blooz & Anni Wombat – choir of angels
- Gilli Smyth – space whisper & poem
- Dingbat Alien (Daevid Allen) – drongophone, nose, gliss guitar, guitar guitar, bi focal vocals & wordplay

Technical

- Grant Showbiz – engineer
