= Graham Clark (violinist) =

English jazz violinist

- Born: Graham Leslie Lionel Clark; 16 December 1959 (age 66)
- Genres: Jazz; rock; blues; pop
- Occupation: Musician
- Instruments: Violin, vocals, electric guitar

Graham Leslie Lionel Clark (born 16 December 1959) is an English violinist based in Buxton, Derbyshire.

He also plays electric guitar. A freelance violinist in most styles of jazz, rock, blues and pop, he specialises in improvisation.

Graham Clark was born in Manchester, in December 1959. His father, Les Clark, played the double bass in dance bands and sometimes had bit-parts on Coronation Street and other Granada TV programmes. His mother, Esme, worked in a school for children who had special educational needs. At first they lived in a terraced house in Chorlton-on-Medlock, close to Manchester’s city centre. He attended Manchester Grammar School. In 1973, the council demolished their house and they had to move to Levenshulme, in South Manchester.

From the age of twelve to fourteen, Clark took violin lessons but he found playing by ear more immediate than reading music and preferred playing along with recordings, resulting in him becoming a skilful improviser. As a teenager he grew interested in all kinds of philosophy and absorbed the alternative culture of the 1970s, which led to him being a big fan of Daevid Allen's psychedelic jazz world music band Gong.

He studied biology then experimental psychology at Sussex University (1978–1982), but a career in music proved to be more important to him. He moved to Bristol to play with contemporary jazz musicians. He moved to London in 1985, supporting himself by busking in the Underground. During this period he met Daevid Allen who was living in Glastonbury, and invited Graham to play with him leading to Gong's resurrection.

Clark played with Allen as a duo, in Gong, and in Magick Brothers from 1988 to 2013, doing several European and one American tour. He performed in Jean-Claude Vannier's 'L'Histoire de Melody Nelson' and 'L'Enfant Assassin des Mouches', staged both in London (2006) and Paris (2008). Now living in Buxton, Derbyshire, he has also played at the Buxton International Festival.

He has worked with Andy Sheppard, Keith Tippett, Tim Richards, Phil Lee, Paz, Brian Godding, Elbow, Lamb, Bryan Glancy, Little Sparrow, Jah Wobble, Graham Massey, Louis Gordon and Liz Fletcher.

Currently part of Tom Thorp's Taka Ensemble.

== Selected discography ==
Featured artist on:

- 2009 Improvisations: Series 1 Graham Clark & Stephen Grew (GAS)
- 2005 Toolshed Album Toolshed (Twisted Nerve)
- 1997 Isthmus Clark, Thorne, Fell (GAS)
- 1997 Typhoid and Swans Sleepy People (Edgy Records)
- 1995 Dreaming a Dream Daevid Allen (GAS)
- 1992 Shapeshifter Gong (Celluloid, France)
- 1989 Gongmaison Gongmaison (Demi Monde)
