= Angel's Egg (album) =

Studio album by Gong
- Released: 7 December 1973
- Recorded: August 1973 in France
- Studio: The Manor Mobile
- Genres: Progressive rock, space rock, psychedelic rock
- Length: 45:14
- Label: Virgin
- Producers: Gong, Giorgio Gomelsky

Gong chronology
| Flying Teapot (1973) | Angel's Egg (1973) | You (1974) |

Professional ratings
Review scores
| Source | Rating |
|---|---|
| Allmusic | 4/5 stars |

Angel's Egg is the fourth studio album by the progressive rock band Gong, released on Virgin Records in December 1973.

It was recorded using The Manor Mobile studio at Gong's communal home, Pavillon du Hay, Voisines, France, and mixed at The Manor, Oxfordshire, England. The album was produced by "Gong under the direction of Giorgio Gomelsky".

Angel's Egg is the second in Gong's Radio Gnome Invisible trilogy of albums, following Flying Teapot and preceding You. The trilogy forms a central part of the Gong mythology. The original album did not have an apostrophe in the title.

The original vinyl edition came with a booklet containing an extensive explanation of the mythology, including lyrics, a glossary of terms, and profiles of characters in the story and band members. This edition also had a gatefold cover (omitted in later pressings), a plain inky blue inner sleeve to match the gate fold and booklet, and had the original black and white Virgin label which was discontinued after 1973; it was one of the last albums to use the original label. Some copies had a sticker over the female nude in the moon on the cover.

The CD version released by Virgin Records, and later reissued on Charly Records contains an extra track: "Ooby-Scooby Doomsday or The D-day DJs Got the D.D.T. Blues", that ends with a male voice choir glissando (questionably regarded by some as a parody on Pink Floyd's "Echoes"), starting with "Ahhhh" and ending with "Chooo", mimicking a sneeze. The track was originally released on the Live Etc. album but was excluded from the CD release (which reissued that double album as one disc), and included on this album instead.

A half speed master cut at Abbey Road by Miles Showell using the 2018 96k24bit files was released in the UK on 180-gram vinyl for Record Store Day on 22 April 2023 to mark the album’s 50th anniversary. This release was in a gatefold sleeve with a replica of the original 16-page Blue Book of lyrics and drawings plus an Abbey Road Certificate.

== Track listing ==
Unusual spellings are as listed on the cover of the original edition. Also, take note that in some CD editions, on the back cover, tracks 7 and 8 are numbered 7a and 7b so that tracks 9–15 have a unity less than the CD reader (included the bonus track that numbers 14 on the cover and 15 on the CD reader).

Side one (Yin / Side of the Goddess)
| No. | Title | Writer(s) | Length |
|---|---|---|---|
| 1. | "Other Side of the Sky" | Tim Blake, Daevid Allen | 7:38 |
| 2. | "Sold to the Highest Buddha" | Mike Howlett, Allen | 4:27 |
| 3. | "Castle in the Clouds" | Steve Hillage | 1:13 |
| 4. | "Prostitute Poem" | Gilli Smyth, Hillage | 4:52 |
| 5. | "Givin My Luv to You" | Allen | 0:47 |
| 6. | "Selene" | Allen | 3:42 |

Side two (Yang / Side of the Fun Gods / The Masculaing Side)
| No. | Title | Writer(s) | Length |
|---|---|---|---|
| 7. | "Flute Salad" | Didier Malherbe | 2:09 |
| 8. | "Oily Way" | Allen, Malherbe | 3:37 |
| 9. | "Outer Temple" | Blake, Hillage | 1:09 |
| 10. | "Inner Temple" | Allen, Malherbe | 2:34 |
| 11. | "Percolations" | Pierre Moerlen | 0:46 |
| 12. | "Love is How U Make It" | Moerlen, Allen | 3:28 |
| 13. | "I Never Glid Before" | Hillage | 5:37 |
| 14. | "Eat That Phone Book Coda" | Malherbe | 3:14 |
| Total length: | | | 45:03 |

CD bonus track
| No. | Title | Writer(s) | Length |
|---|---|---|---|
| 15. | "Ooby-Scooby Doomsday or The D-Day DJs Got the D.D.T. Blues" | Allen | 5:09 |

The instrumental section at the end of "Sold to the Highest Buddha" is referred to as "6/8 sax" in the cover notes, and became a separate piece titled "6/8" on Gong Live Etc. "Selene" is a completely different song from one with the same title on an earlier Gong album, Camembert Electrique. Similarly, "Percolations" is a completely different song from the one with the same title on the later Gong album, Gazeuse!.

Later CD editions add more bonus tracks, including demo vocal versions with altered mixing.

== Charts ==
| Chart (1974) | Peak position |
|---|---|
| Australia (Kent Music Report) | 91 |

== Personnel ==
Note: Pseudonyms and absurd instrument names selected by Daevid Allen are used on the album credits; real names are used in composer credits, and are shown in brackets.

- Bloomdido Bad De Grasse (Didier Malherbe) – ten/sop sax, floot, bi-focal vocal
- Shakti Yoni (Gilli Smyth) – space whisper, loin cackle
- T. Being esq. (Mike Howlett, spelled Howlitt on composer credits) – basso profundo
- Sub. Capt. Hillage (Steve Hillage) – lewd guitar
- Hi T. Moonweed (the favourite) (Tim Blake) – Cynthia "size a", lady voce
- Pierre de Strasbourg (Pierre Moerlen, spelled Moerlin on composer credits) – bread & batteur drums, vibes, marimba
- Mirielle de Strasbourg (Mireille Bauer) – glockenspiel
- Dingo Virgin (Daevid Allen) – local vocals, aluminium croon, glissando guitar
