= Magick Brother =

Studio album by Gong
- Released: March 1970
- Recorded: September–October 1969; Studio ETA and Studio Europa Sonor, Paris, France
- Genres: Psychedelic rock; psychedelic pop
- Length: 43:52
- Label: BYG Actuel
- Producers: Jean Georgakarakos, Jean-Luc Young

Gong chronology
Magick Brother (1970)	Camembert Electrique (1971)

Professional ratings
Review scores
Source	Rating
Allmusic	2.5/5 stars

Magick Brother is the debut studio album by the progressive rock band Gong, recorded in Paris during September and October 1969 and released in March 1970 on the French BYG Actuel label.

The band's recently recruited bass player Christian Tritsch was not ready in time to play on the album, and so singer/songwriter/guitarist Daevid Allen played the bass guitar himself; a photo of Allen recording bass tracks for the album is featured on the cover artwork. They also made use of jazz contrabass (double bass) players Earl Freeman and Barre Phillips, who were recording for the label at the same time, on three tracks. Occasional early Gong collaborator Dieter Gewissler, who normally played violin, also contributed some "free" bowed contrabass to two tracks. The LP sleeves were printed before the final track order and titles had been decided and so the songs "Rational Anthem" (AKA "Change the World") and "Glad To Sad To Say" were listed the wrong way round.

Shortly afterwards, the band played its debut gig at the BYG Actuel Festival in the small town of Amougies, Belgium, on 27 October 1969, introduced to the stage by bemused compere Frank Zappa.

== Track listing ==
All songs written by Daevid Allen, though credited to his partner Gilli Smyth for legal reasons.

Produced by Jean Georgakarakos and Jean Luc Young.

Side one (early morning)
No.	Title	Length
1.	"Mystic Sister"	1:32
2.	"Magick Brother"	4:44
3.	"Rational Anthem (Change the World)" (mislabelled as "Glad To Sad To say")	3:43
4.	"Glad To Sad To Say" (mislabelled as "Rational Anthem")	4:09
5.	"Chainstore Chant"	1:13
6.	"Pretty Miss Titty"	4:06
7.	"Fredfish / Hope You Feel OK" ("Fredfish" listed on LP label but not on LP cover)	4:33

Side two (late night)
No.	Title	Length
8.	"Ego"	3:57
9.	"Gong Song"	4:11
10.	"Princess Dreaming"	2:56
11.	"5 & 20 Schoolgirls"	4:30
12.	"Cos You Got Green Hair"	5:05
Total length:		43:52

The version on CD has a different tracks grouping and lengths:

Side one (early morning)
No.	Title	Length
1.	"Mystic Sister, Magick Brother"	5:54
2.	"Rational Anthem"	4:08
3.	"Glad To Sad To Say"	3:45
4.	"Chainstore Chant & Pretty Miss Titty"	4:49
5.	"Fable Of A Fredfish & Hope You Feel O.K."	4:43

Side two (late night)
No.	Title	Length
6.	"Ego"	3:58
7.	"Gong Song"	4:12
8.	"Princess Dreaming"	2:56
9.	"Five & Twenty Schoolgirls"	4:30
10.	"Cos You Got Green Hair"	5:05
Total length:		44:00

== Credits ==
Gong

- Daevid Allen – guitar, bass guitar, vocals
- Gilli Smyth – space whisper
- Didier Malherbe – flute, soprano saxophone
- Rachid Houari – drums, percussion

Additional personnel

- Barre Phillips – contrabass on 4 & 10
- Earl Freeman – contrabass on 8, piano on 9
- Burton Greene – piano on 8
- Dieter Gewissler – bowed contrabass on 2 & 9
- Tasmin Smyth (Gilli's daughter) – voices on 1 & 10
