= Flying Teapot (album) =

Studio album by Gong
- Released: 25 May 1973
- Recorded: January 1973; The Manor Studios, Oxford, UK
- Genres: Progressive rock; space rock
- Length: 37:57
- Label: Virgin
- Producer: Giorgio Gomelsky

Gong chronology
Continental Circus (1972)	Flying Teapot (1973)	Angel's Egg (1973)

Professional ratings
Review scores
Source	Rating
Allmusic	4/5 stars

Flying Teapot is the third studio album by the progressive rock band Gong, originally released by Virgin Records in May 1973. It was the second entry in the Virgin catalogue (V2002) and was released on the same day as the first, Mike Oldfield's Tubular Bells (V2001). It was re-issued in 1977, with different cover art, by BYG in France and Japan. Recorded at Virgin's Manor Studios, in Oxfordshire, England, it was produced by Giorgio Gomelsky and engineered by "Simon Sandwitch 2 aided by Tom Zen" (Simon Heyworth and Tom Newman).

Subtitled Radio Gnome Invisible, Part 1, it is the first of the Radio Gnome Invisible trilogy of albums, followed by Angel's Egg in December and You the following October. This trilogy forms a central part of the Gong mythology. The Flying Teapot idea itself was influenced by Russell's teapot. It was the first Gong album to feature English guitarist Steve Hillage, although he contributed relatively little as he arrived late in the recording process. According to Daevid Allen, "Steve Hillage arrived eventually, but there wasn't a lot of space left. He played some rhythmick wa wa [sic], some jazzy chords and a spacey solo [on 'Zero the Hero'.]"

In the Q & Mojo Classic Special Edition Pink Floyd & The Story of Prog Rock, the album came #35 in its list of "40 Cosmic Rock Albums".

== Track listing ==
Side one
No.	Title	Writer(s)	Length
1.	"Radio Gnome Invisible"	Daevid Allen	5:32
2.	"Flying Teapot"	Allen, Francis Moze	12:30

Side two
No.	Title	Writer(s)	Length
3.	"The Pot Head Pixies"	Allen	3:00
4.	"The Octave Doctors and the Crystal Machine"	Tim Blake	2:00
5.	"Zero the Hero and the Witch's Spell"	Allen, Blake, Christian Tritsch	9:45
6.	"Witch's Song / I Am Your Pussy"	Gilli Smyth, Allen	5:10
Total length:			37:57

== Personnel ==
The original personnel listing is as follows:

- Pon voicebox – Dingo Virgin & Hi T Moonweed the favourite
- Orgone box & space whisper – the Good Witch Yoni
- VCS3box Cynthia size A & crystal machine – Hi T Moonweed the favourite
- Split sax i.e. tenna & soprasox & so flooth – The Good Count Bloomdido Bad De Grasse
- Gitbox – Stevie Hillside (spermguitar & slow whale), The Submarine Captain (sidereal slideguitar & Dogfoot), Dingo Virgin & others (aluminium croonguitar & stumblestrum)
- VCS3 fertilised elect piano & left bank uptightright pno & Shakesperian meat bass – Francis Bacon
- Drumbox kicks and knocks – Lawrence the alien
- Congox – Rachid Whoarewe the Treeclimber
- Road crew & trux – Venux De Luxe (switch doctor), Wiz De Kid (lights) & Duke

These pseudonyms, in turn, represented:

- Daevid Allen – vocals, guitar
- Gilli Smyth – space whisper
- Tim Blake – synthesizer, vocals
- Didier Malherbe – saxes, flute
- Steve Hillage – guitar
- Christian Tritsch – guitar
- Francis Moze – bass guitar, piano
- Laurie Allan – drums
- Rachid Houari – congas
- Francis Linon – live sound mixing
- "Wiz De Kid" – lighting technician
- "Duke" – roadie
