= Gilli Smyth =

English musician

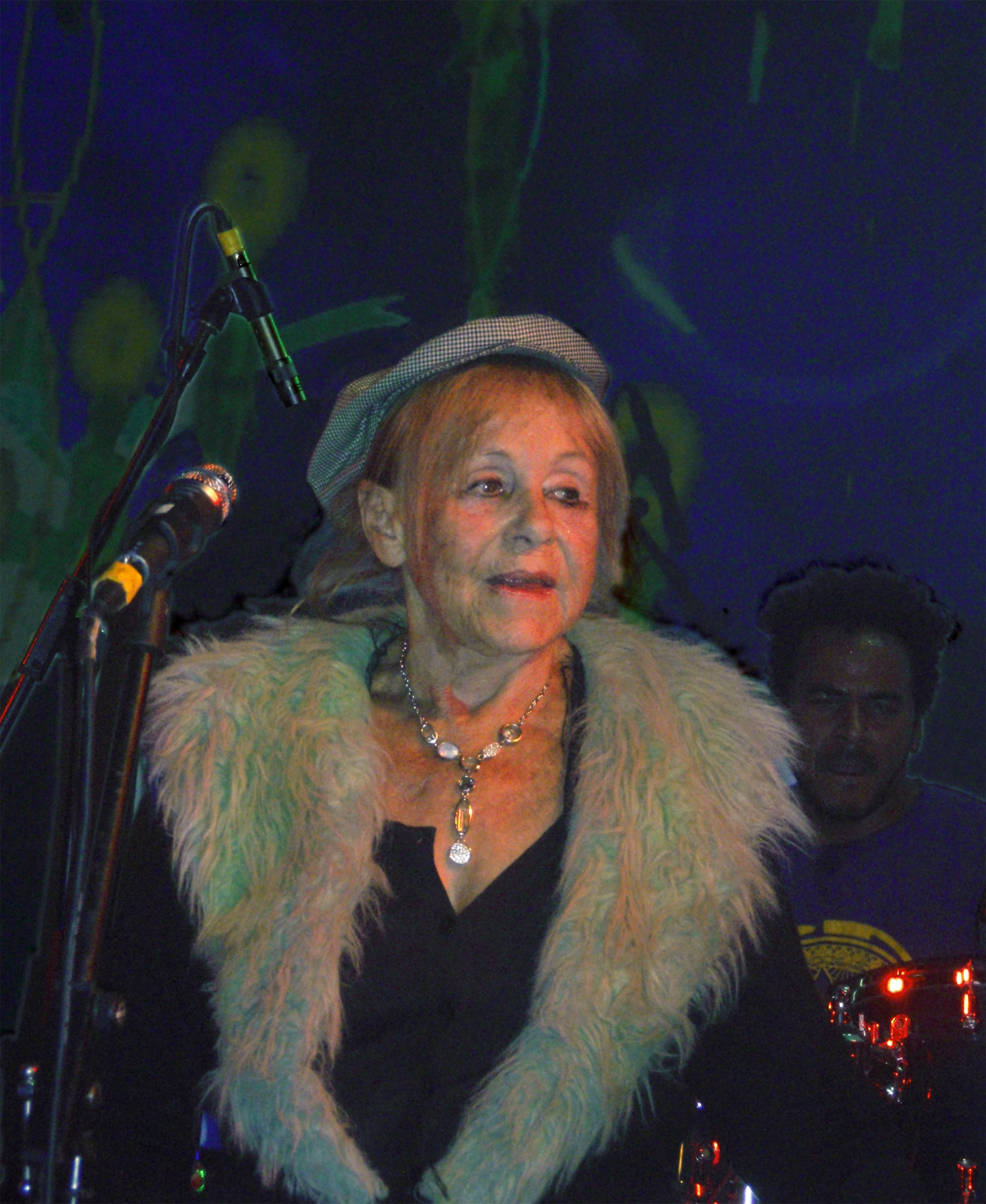
- Smyth performing with Gong in Tel Aviv, 2009

Background information
- Birth name: Gillian Mary Smyth
- Born: 1 June 1933; London, England
- Died: 22 August 2016 (aged 83); Byron Bay, New South Wales, Australia
- Genres: Spoken word; jazz rock; space rock
- Occupations: Poet; musician; writer
- Instrument: Vocals
- Website: gillismyth.com

Gillian Mary Smyth (1 June 1933 – 22 August 2016) was an English musician best known for co-founding the Canterbury scene group Gong with her partner Daevid Allen in 1967. She also released music with spinoff groups Mother Gong and Planet Gong as well as releasing several solo albums and albums in collaboration with other members of Gong. In Gong, she often performed under the name Shakti Yoni, contributing poems and vocals dubbed "space whispers".

== Biography ==
Smyth was born in London. She studied at King's College London, (the liner notes for Voiceprint's 'Mother Gong' CD suggests 'London University') where she gained notoriety as the outspoken sub-editor of "Kings News", a college magazine. After a brief spell teaching at the Sorbonne (Paris) (where she became bilingual), she began doing performance poetry with well-known English jazz-rock group Soft Machine, founded by her partner and long-time collaborator, Daevid Allen, in 1968.

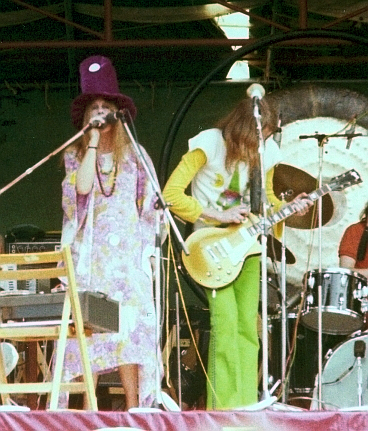
Gilli Smyth with Daevid Allen, Hyde Park, 1974

She co-founded Gong with Allen, an outfit that included musicians such as Steve Hillage, Pierre Moerlen and Didier Malherbe. All of the songs on the albums Magick Brother and Continental Circus are listed as written or co-written by her. In her spoken-word poetry, especially within Gong's "Radio Gnome Invisible" Trilogy, she portrays a prostitute, a cat, a mother, a witch, and an old woman, and she was known for wearing costumes for these personas on stage. This became part of a cult mythology, which was written into sixteen albums that the band recorded. Gong developed into a family of bands, including Gongmaison and Mother Gong. Mother, Smyth's 1978 solo album, led to her founding Mother Gong, having left the original band in 1975 to have children.

Mother Gong toured internationally in 1979-81 and 1989–91, either headlining or supporting such artists as Bob Dylan and Big Brother and the Holding Company. Smyth appeared as a solo performer and lecturer at the Starwood Festival from 1992-93. She did voice-overs for commercials, recorded audio books for children, as well as other books and poetry, gave workshops on voice projection and voice as a confidence-raiser, and also performed for many women's groups.

== Death ==
She died in hospital in Byron Bay on 22 August 2016 at the age of 83 of pulmonary pneumonia.
