= Martyn Bates =

English musician

Martyn Bates

Martyn Bates (born 1957) is an English singer, musician and songwriter.

Bates grew up listening to English folk music before as a teenager becoming excited by punk, getting involved in the more diverse and experimental post-punk scene. After releasing tapes of experimental, industrial music as Migraine Inducers he formed Eyeless In Gaza with Peter Becker in January 1980. The duo became known for their unconventional instrumentation and arrangements, and for Bates’s passionate vocals, which at times were whispered, howled, or stammered. Eyeless In Gaza released six albums on Cherry Red Records. These were Photographs as Memories (1981), Caught in Flux (1981), Pale Hands I Loved So Well (1982), Drumming the Beating Heart (1982), Rust Red September (1983) and Back from the Rains (1985), and then went on hiatus until 1992. A 2nd (unofficial) hiatus remains ongoing since late 2020, with Bates recording solo as Kodax Strophes.

Picking up from 1982’s acclaimed Letters Written (1982) solo album, Bates then concentrated mostly on solo work for a while, going on to collaborate with Anne Clark (Just After Sunset 1998) – also starting the short-lived bands Cry Acetylene Angel, Hungry I, and The Sing Circus (with This Mortal Coil ’s Deirdre Rutkowski). He contributed to Derek Jarman's soundtracks The Garden and The Last of England. Then he temporarily relocated his main focus to Europe, releasing three solo albums on the Belgian based Antler Subway label – Love Smashed on a Rock (1988), Letters to a Scattered Family (1990) and Stars Come Trembling (1990), which musically offered initial glimpses of the acoustic folk roots of his youth.

In 1993, Bates began working with former Napalm Death drummer Mick Harris, collaborating on a three album series of Murder Ballads, creating an innovative marriage of “isolationist” ambience with folk-song form. In the same time frame Bates created a virtually a cappella work – a two volume series of “song-settings” of James Joyce's Chamber Music cycle of 36 poems (released in 1994 and 1996).

From 1992 onwards, Bates has run a parallel career recording and performing with a re-vitalised Eyeless In Gaza – with Eyeless deftly blending song with collaged soundscaping – while Bates otherwise continues to develop his own intense and possibly autobiographical solo work.

Bates’s solo outings of particular note include the albums Imagination Feels Like Poison (1997), Arriving Fire (2014), and I Said To Love (2017). As Twelve Thousand Days, since 2000 Bates has also worked with Orchis/Temple Music/Nurse With Wound collaborator Alan Trench – producing nine albums of what they call “channelled wyrd folk, psych-musics & other curios”, including the They Have All Gone Into the World of Light (2024) album.

Since 2020 Bates has resurrected his early, more freely experimental approach, under the name KODAX STROPHES. A new album is expected to be released following on his Christ in the House of Martha & Mary in 2024.

Bates is the author of five books that he describes as "lyrics to songs heard and unheard, and other gathered miscellany". Bates writes: "In writing, my feeling is that the songs, words and music here are NOT discreet entities – they are elements in the same discourse – where each casts certainty or doubt, illumination or shade, upon the other".

== Discography ==
Solo albums

- Dissonance/Antagonistic Music (cassette as Migraine Inducers), 1979
- Letters Written (10" album), 1982
- The Return of the Quiet, 1987
- Love Smashed on a Rock, 1988
- Letters to a Scattered Family, 1990
- Stars Come Trembling, 1990
- Port of Stormy Lights (Sordide Sentimental, booklet by J.P. Turmel with CD), 1990
- Chamber Music 1, 1994
- Mystery Seas, 1995
- Chamber Music 2, 1996
- Imagination Feels Like Poison, 1997
- Dance of Hours, 2001
- Your Jewelled Footsteps (solo and collaboration works 1979–2006) (compilation), 2006
- A Map of the Stars in Summer (lyric book with CD), 2008
- Unsung, 2012
- Arriving Fire, 2014
- Fireworks & Jewels/The Colour of Amber, 2015
- I Said to Love, 2017

Books

- Imagination Feels Like Poison, 1997
- Plague of Years, 2000
- A Map of the Stars in Summer, 2008
- Notes on Mythic Language, 2015
- November: Inky Blue Sky, 2015

Anne Clark & Martyn Bates

- Just After Sunset – The Poetry of Rainer Maria Rilke, 1998

Martyn Bates & M.J. Harris

- Murder Ballads (Drift), 1994
- Murder Ballads (Passages), 1997
- Murder Ballads (Incest Songs), 1998

Twelve Thousand Days (Martyn Bates & Alan Trench)

- In the Garden of Wild Stars, 2000
- The Devil in the Grain, 2001
- At the Landgate, CD-Ep 2005
- From the Walled Garden, 2006
- Insect Silence, 2018
- Field’s End, 2020
- The Birds Sing as Bells, 2022
- The Boatman on the Downs, 2023
- They Have All Gone Into the World of Light, 2024

Martyn Bates & Troum

- To a Child Dancing in the Wind, 2006

Martyn Bates & Max Eastley

- Songs of Transformation, 2007

Sorry For Laughing (Gordon H. Whitlow/Ed Ka-Spel/Martyn Bates)

- See It Alone, 2020
- Remember, You Are An Actor, 2021
- Sun Comes, 2024
- Rain Flowers, 2025

as KODAX STROPHES/MARTYN BATES

- It Doesn't Matter Where It's Solstice When You're In The Room, 2020
- Post-War Baby, 2021
- Summer, Cat’s Cradle, 2022
- Christ in the House of Martha & Mary, 2024
