= Mr Dibs =

British musician (born 1964)

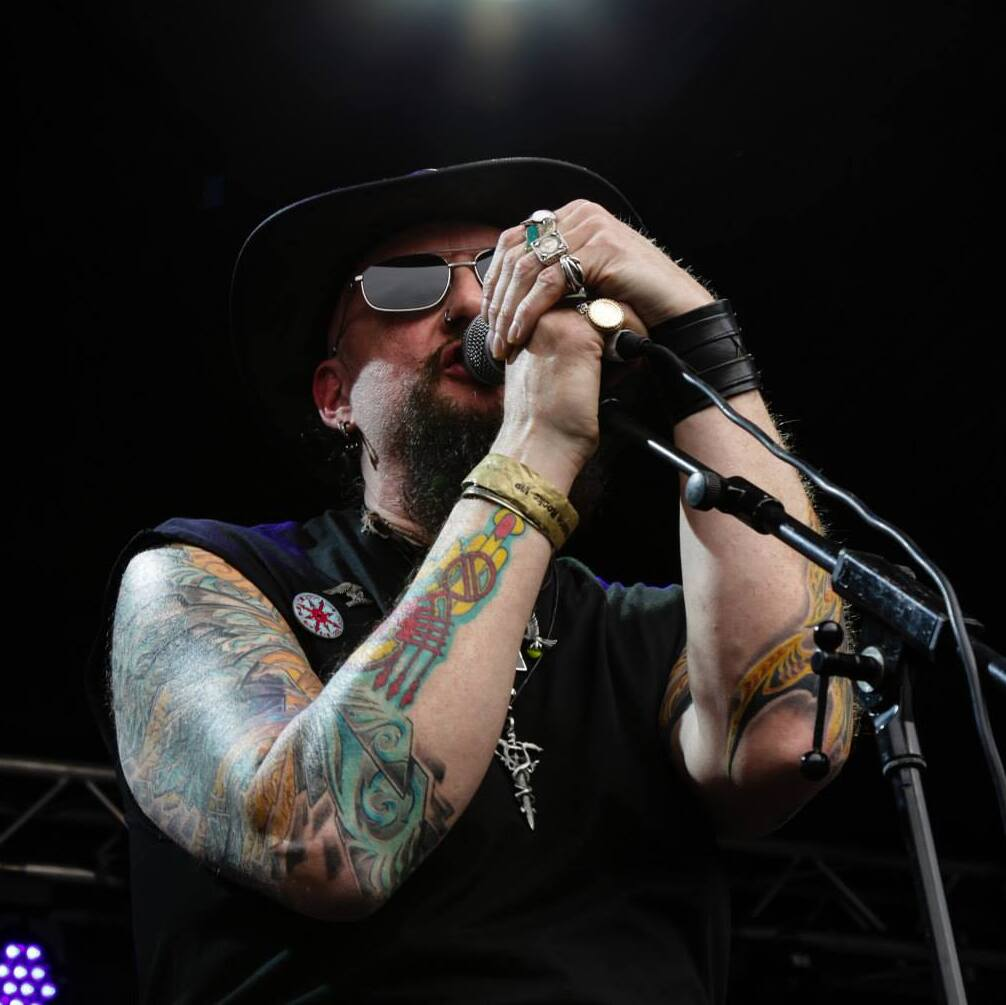
- Mr Dibs singing with Hawkwind in 2014

Background information
- Born: Jonathan Darbyshire; 4 August 1964 (age 62)
- Genre: Space rock
- Occupation: Musician
- Instruments: Vocals; guitar; bass; cello; keyboards
- Years active: 1989–present
- Website: https://www.facebook.com/HowlinDibs https://mrdibs.bandcamp.com/music

Jonathan Darbyshire (born 4 August 1964) (now Jonathan Hulme by deed poll), widely known by his stage name Mr Dibs or Dibs Hawkwinder, is a British musician, best known as a former member of the space rock group Hawkwind.

== Career ==
Before Hawkwind, Mr Dibs played in two underground space rock bands, Krel and Spacehead. Krel released a series of cassettes, the first unofficial release "Bring on the Clones" having a handful of Hawkwind songs on the tape, the later "official" releases being sold commercially. Krel supported Hawkwind at 2 gigs in 1991, before being invited to do the entire Electric Tepee Tour, in spring 1992 as support band. Occasionally, Krel would perform a Hawkwind song, notably "Where Are you Now", during their set, and "Visions of You Know You're Only Dreaming" in their soundcheck. Indeed, at Brighton, on that tour, Hawkwind played first, and Krel last on the bill, so that night, Hawkwind were supporting Dibs and the rest of Krel.

=== Hawkwind 2007–2018 ===
Dibs became a member of the Hawkwind road crew in 1997, where he remained for a decade, often guesting onstage reciting poems. In 2007, Dibs became the band's bassist, following the departure of Alan Davey. Hawkwind's own festival, 'Hawkfest' 2007, heralded Dibs's debut appearance with the band as a full-time member.

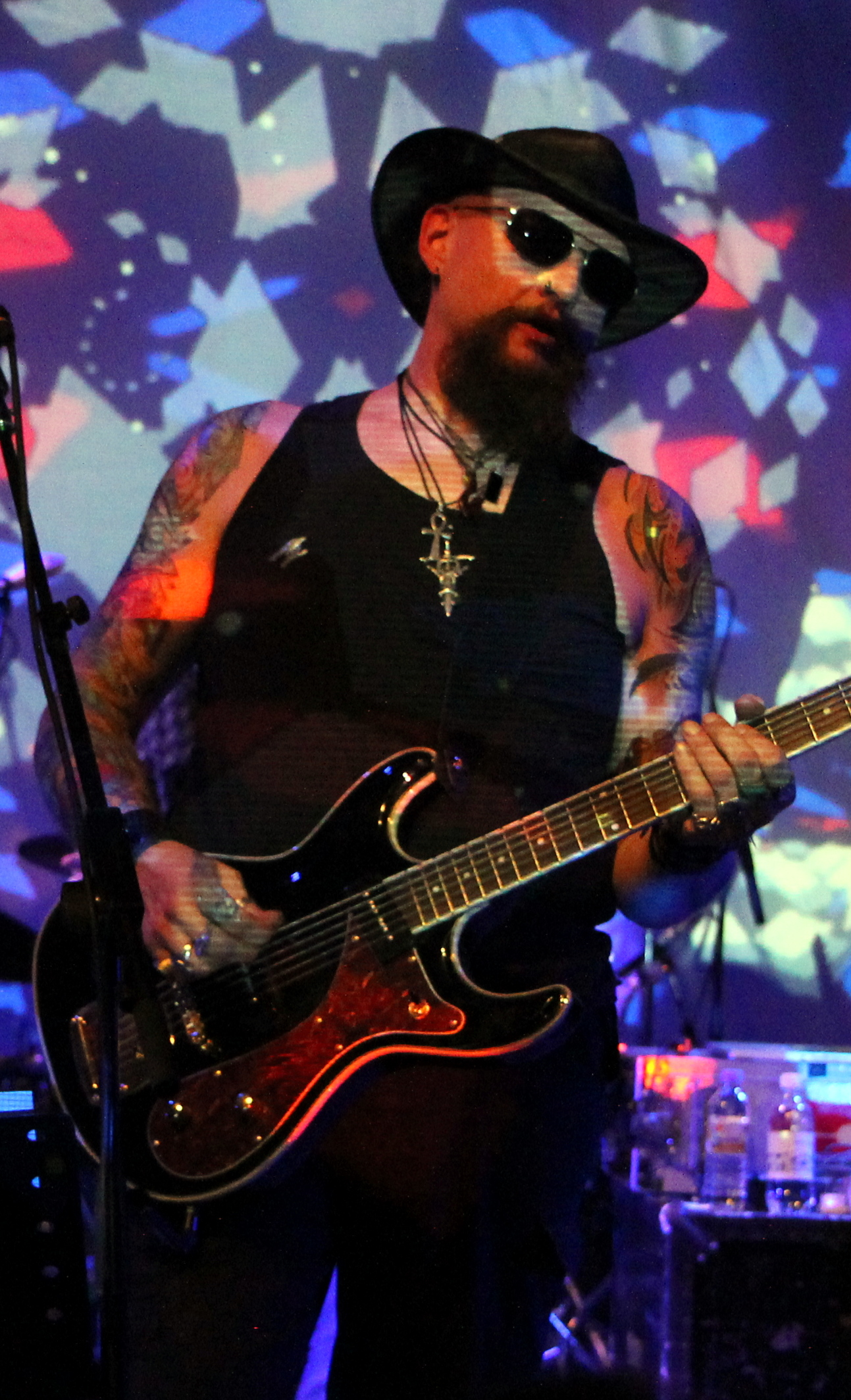
Mr Dibs playing with Hawkwind at Hawkeaster 2014

Subsequently, Dibs's role shifted to more of a frontman role at live shows, owing to Dave Brock's preference against taking centre stage, with him sharing lead vocals with Brock, as well as cello, bass, audio generator and baritone guitar. Since 2011 when Niall Hone went from guitar to bass guitar, Dibs became the constant live frontman/bassist. (Effectively, the band had two bassists at this point).. Dibs relinquished the bass completely in 2017 when Haz Wheaton joined the band to become the sole bass player, Niall Hone moved onto electronics/keys.

Since his induction to the band he has appeared on five studio albums, 2010's Blood of the Earth, 2012's Onward, 2016's The Machine Stops, 2017's Into The Woods and 2018's Road to Utopia as well as three live albums, 2007's Knights of Space, 2014's Space Ritual Live and 2017's ‘’At The Roundhouse’’. Dibs also appeared on 2013's compilation Spacehawks.

In 2017/2018, Dibs had been more involved with electronics/audio generator on stage.

Dibs left Hawkwind in August 2018 with the following message posted on the ‘Hawkwind Fans Worldwide’ Facebook Group Page: ‘ My friends, it is with a heavy heart that I must confirm that due to irreconcilable differences, I left Hawkwind on Tuesday 28 August 2018. I've had the most wonderful 21 years on board, both as roadie and musician and I'm very proud of everything I've achieved and everything I've become. Not many people get the break I did. Thanks to all the fans for their support and love over the years, and to the great friendships forged. Hawkwind is so much more than the music and band. Well then. See you all out there! Peace and Love Dibs XX‘

Dibs has also played with fellow Hawkwind members under the guise of The Elves of Silbury Hill.

Dibs appeared on the ‘’Acoustic Daze’’ LP released in 2019 (He was wrongly credited as Mr Fibbs) Acoustic Daze was also the bonus disc of the ‘’All Aboard the Skylark’’ CD release. The band went into the studio after the 2017 tour and recorded acoustic versions of songs which appear on this LP which were subsequently given to Mike Batt for the 'Road to Utopia' album.

=== New ventures 2018–present ===
Dibs was guest bassist for Evil Blizzard and played cello on two tracks on their Worst Show On Earth album.

28 October 2018 – Dibs announced on Facebook that he had joined the band Evil Blizzard in the guise of Mr Freshcrawl.

11 December 2018 – It was announced on the Strip Search Tramp Facebook page that Dibs had joined the band on ‘Dirty Sonics.’ July 2019 – A 4 track EP was released on CD and download via Bandcamp with live performances in July and December.

February 2019 – Dibs appeared on the cover of the February 2019 issue 5 of the glossy music magazine Eighth Day which included 10 pages of an interview plus pictures. Dibs talked about his Hawkwind – Krel – Spacehead days and his plans for the future.

2 January 2020 – Dibs announced on his ‘Howlin Dibs’ Facebook page that he was recording a new solo album ‘with guests from Evil Blizzard and a few surprises to come.’

12 February 2020 – Dibs announced on his Facebook page that he had set up a Bandcamp account which included releases by Krel – Spacehead – Lab 23 – Mr Dibs. https://mrdibs.bandcamp.com/music.

16 October 2024 - winner of HRH Prog Bass Player of the Year Award

== Hawklords 2021-2025 ==
23 August 2021 – Hawklords Facebook page announced that Mr Dibs had joined the band and would be appearing on their October tour dates. He subsequently appeared on his first Hawklords release – Live At Kozfest 2022. Mr Dibs wrote tracks and contributed vocals, bass, and audio generator to the 2023 release Space and 2024's Relativity. He posted on Facebook that he had left Hawklords in September 2025.

== Discography ==
=== Krel ===
- Bring on the Clones (private cassette) 1990
- Who's Next On This (cassette) 1991
- Dark Star (cassette) 1992
- Earth Zero (cassette) 1993
- Out Of Space 2003 (the eventual CD release of the 1992 "The Shed" tapes.)

=== Spacehead ===
- Sentinal (cassette)
- The Question Remains (cassette)
- Of Stars And Time 1996
- In Space We Trust Live '95–'98
- Explode into Space Inhalations 1998–2000
- Escape Velocity Preview 2003
- Live @ Hawkfest 2003
- Roadburn 2006 (live)
- Spacehead Out Takes 1994

=== Hawkwind ===
- Knights of Space 2007 (live)
- Blood of the Earth 2010
- Onward 2012
- Spacehawks 2013 (compilation)
- Space Ritual Live 2014 (live)
- The Machine Stops 2016
- Into The Woods 2017
- At The Roundhouse 2017 (live)
- Road To Utopia 2018
- Acoustic Daze 2019 (lead vocals on track 8 and backing vocals on tracks 9, 10 and 11) bonus CD disc with All Aboard the Skylark CD and also standalone release on vinyl

=== Strip Search Tramp ===
- Assume The Position EP 2019

=== Evil Blizzard ===
• The Worst Show On Earth (guest on two tracks)

- Rotting In The Belly Of The Whale 2023

=== Hawklords ===
- "Live At Kozfest 2022" 2022
- Space 2023
- Relativity 2024
