= The Machine Stops (album) =

Studio album by Hawkwind
- Released: 15 April 2016
- Recorded: 2015–16
- Genre: Space rock; progressive rock
- Length: 58:29
- Label: Cherry Red
- Producer: Hawkwind

Hawkwind chronology
Onward (2012)	The Machine Stops (2016)	Into The Woods (2017)

Professional ratings
Aggregate scores
Source	Rating
Metacritic	65/100
Review scores
Source	Rating
AllMusic	3/5 stars

The Machine Stops is a concept album by space rock band Hawkwind, released on 15 April 2016. It is inspired by the E.M. Forster short story of the same name. It is Hawkwind's twenty-ninth studio album, Hawkwind's first album recorded without the involvement of Tim Blake since 2010's Blood of the Earth and the first to feature bassist Haz Wheaton.

Following Spacehawks, which was a compilation album largely consisting of re-recorded songs, and Stellar Variations which had been released under the Hawkwind Light Orchestra moniker, The Machine Stops is Hawkwind's first studio album composed entirely of new material released under the Cherry Red label.

== Production and release ==
Mr Dibs had first mentioned the production of a new album at a 2014 concert in Manchester. The official Hawkwind Twitter account first announced that the album was in the works in December 2015.

The band played "The Machine" and its preceding spoken word counterpart "All Hail The Machine" at a performance at The Coronet in London on 20 December 2015.

Hawkwind released one single from the album for free on their Facebook page, "A Solitary Man" with an accompanying video in March 2016.

Tim Blake left the band before the album's release to pursue his Crystal Machine project and does not feature on the album, with his usual contributions being replaced by increased synthesizer work by Niall Hone and Dead Fred.

The album also marks the first official appearance of Haz Wheaton. Wheaton had appeared with the "skeleton crew" spin off live band, Technicians of Spaceship Hawkwind some years before joining the band at The Coronet performance in December 2015 to play bass. Following that performance and the release of the album, he was a feature of the live shows for the next couple of years, as well as playing on the band's next studio album Into The Woods. Here, he contributes bass to the final two tracks, "Tube" and "Lost In Science".

The album entered the Official UK charts at number 29. This was the highest chart position since Choose Your Masques in 1982 which achieved the same chart position.

== Track listing ==
All tracks written by Dave Brock except where stated.

No.	Title	Writer(s)	Length
1.	"All Hail the Machine"	Brock, Jonathan Darbyshire	3:24
2.	"The Machine"	Brock, Darbyshire, Richard Chadwick	4:39
3.	"Katie"		0:56
4.	"King of the World"		2:51
5.	"In My Room"		3:43
6.	"Thursday"		4:09
7.	"Synchronized Blue"		5:24
8.	"Hexagone"	Phil Reeves	4:52
9.	"Living on Earth"		6:27
10.	"The Harmonic Hall"	Niall Hone	4:56
11.	"Yum Yum"		1:04
12.	"A Solitary Man"		5:03
13.	"Tube"		4:28
14.	"Lost in Science"		6:33

== Personnel ==
Hawkwind

- Dave Brock – vocals (tracks 2, 4-7, 9, 11-14), guitars (tracks 2, 4-7, 9, 12-14), synthesizers (tracks 1, 2, 4-7, 9, 13, 14), keyboards (tracks 2, 4-7, 9, 12-14), all instruments (tracks 3, 11)
- Richard Chadwick – drums (tracks 2, 4-7, 12-14)
- Mr Dibs – vocals (tracks 1, 2), bass (tracks 2, 9, 12)
- Niall Hone – bass (tracks 4-7), all instruments (tracks 10)
- Dead Fred – all instruments (tracks 8), vocals (tracks 8)
- Haz Wheaton – bass (tracks 13, 14)

== Charts ==
Chart (2016)	Peak position
Scottish Albums (OCC)	24
UK Albums (OCC)	29
UK Independent Albums (OCC)	4
UK Rock & Metal Albums (OCC)	2
