= Pillows & Prayers =

Compilation album by Various
- Released: December 1982
- Recorded: various
- Genres: Acoustic; Experimental; Post-punk; Rock
- Length: 47:35
- Label: Cherry Red

Various chronology
Pillows & Prayers (1982)	Pillows & Prayers 2 (1984)

Professional ratings
Review scores
Source	Rating
Allmusic	4/5 stars
The Guardian	(favorable)

Pillows & Prayers (subtitled Cherry Red 1982-1983) is a compilation album released at Christmas 1982, featuring artists on the Cherry Red record label. The record was originally sold at 99 pence (in fact, "pay no more than 99p" was printed on the original sleeve), which helped ensure that the album peaked and remained at number 1 on the UK Indie Chart for five weeks and sold over 120,000 copies.

In 2007 the album was repackaged as a 3-CD plus DVD box set featuring complementary tracks from the same period and an extended essay by Alex Ogg. This revised edition won the 2008 MOJO Award for Catalogue Release of the Year, with three of the key artists, Martyn Bates (Eyeless in Gaza), Lawrence (Felt) and Bid (The Monochrome Set) appearing on stage to collect the award, alongside Cherry Red founder Iain McNay.

== Tracks ==
Side A
No.	Title	Writer(s)	Artist	Length
1.	"Portrait"	Graham Cassie, David Harper, David Knight, Ashley Wales, Daniel Whittock	Five or Six	2:52
2.	"Eine Symphonie des Grauens"	Bid (Ganesh Seshadri)	The Monochrome Set	2:19
3.	"All About You"	Thomas Leer	Thomas Leer	3:50
4.	"Plain Sailing"	Tracey Thorn	Tracey Thorn	2:01
5.	"Some Things Don't Matter"	Ben Watt	Ben Watt	4:25
6.	"Love in Your Heart"	Kevin Coyne	Kevin Coyne	2:55
7.	"Modi 2 (Extract)"	Piero Milesi	Piero Milesi	1:02
8.	"Compulsion"	Joe Crow	Joe Crow	4:23

Side B
No.	Title	Writer(s)	Artist	Length
9.	"Lazy Ways"	Jane Fox	Marine Girls	2:42
10.	"My Face Is on Fire"	Lawrence	Felt	3:04
11.	"No Noise"	Peter Becker, Martyn Bates	Eyeless in Gaza	2:49
12.	"XOYO"	Dick Witts	The Passage	3:26
13.	"On My Mind"	Thorn	Everything but the Girl	3:08
14.	"A Bang and a Wimpey"	John Baine	Attila the Stockbroker	1:41
15.	"I Unseen"	Tony Hill	The Misunderstood	1:58
16.	"Don't Blink"	Robert Lloyd, Paul Apperley, Steve Hawkins, Andy Lloyd	The Nightingales	4:00
17.	"Stop the Music for a Minute"	Quentin Crisp	Quentin Crisp	1:00

== Pillows and Prayers 2 ==
In 1984 a sequel, Pillows and Prayers 2, was released in Japan. This time, there was no special price. In 2000 the album was reissued on CD (CDMRED 169) together with volume 1.

=== Tracks ===
1. Marine Girls - "A Place in the Sun" (2:29)
2. Jane - "It's a Fine Day" (2:45)
3. Kevin Hewick - "Feathering the Nest" (3:51)
4. Fantastic Something - "If She Doesn't Smile" (3:14)
5. Eyeless in Gaza - "New Risen" (2:47)
6. The Monochrome Set - "Jet Set Junta" (2:04)
7. Morgan Fisher - "Un Homme et une Femme" - (2:45)
8. Felt - "The World Is As Soft As Lace" (4:15)
9. Maurice Deebank - "The Watery Song" (4:54)
10. In Embrace - "Shouting in Cafes" (3:33)
11. Grab Grab the Haddock - "I'm Used Now" (3:17)
12. Ben Watt & Robert Wyatt - "Walter and John" (4:05)
13. Five or Six - "Another Reason" (3:04)
14. Red Box - "Chenko" (3:40)

"Un Homme et Une Femme" is the theme from the film of the same name, composed by Francis Lai and with lyrics by Pierre Barouh. "It's A Fine Day" was later a hit single when covered by Opus III several years later, and Red Box went on to chart success after signing to WEA.
