= Niall Hone =

English musician (born 1970)

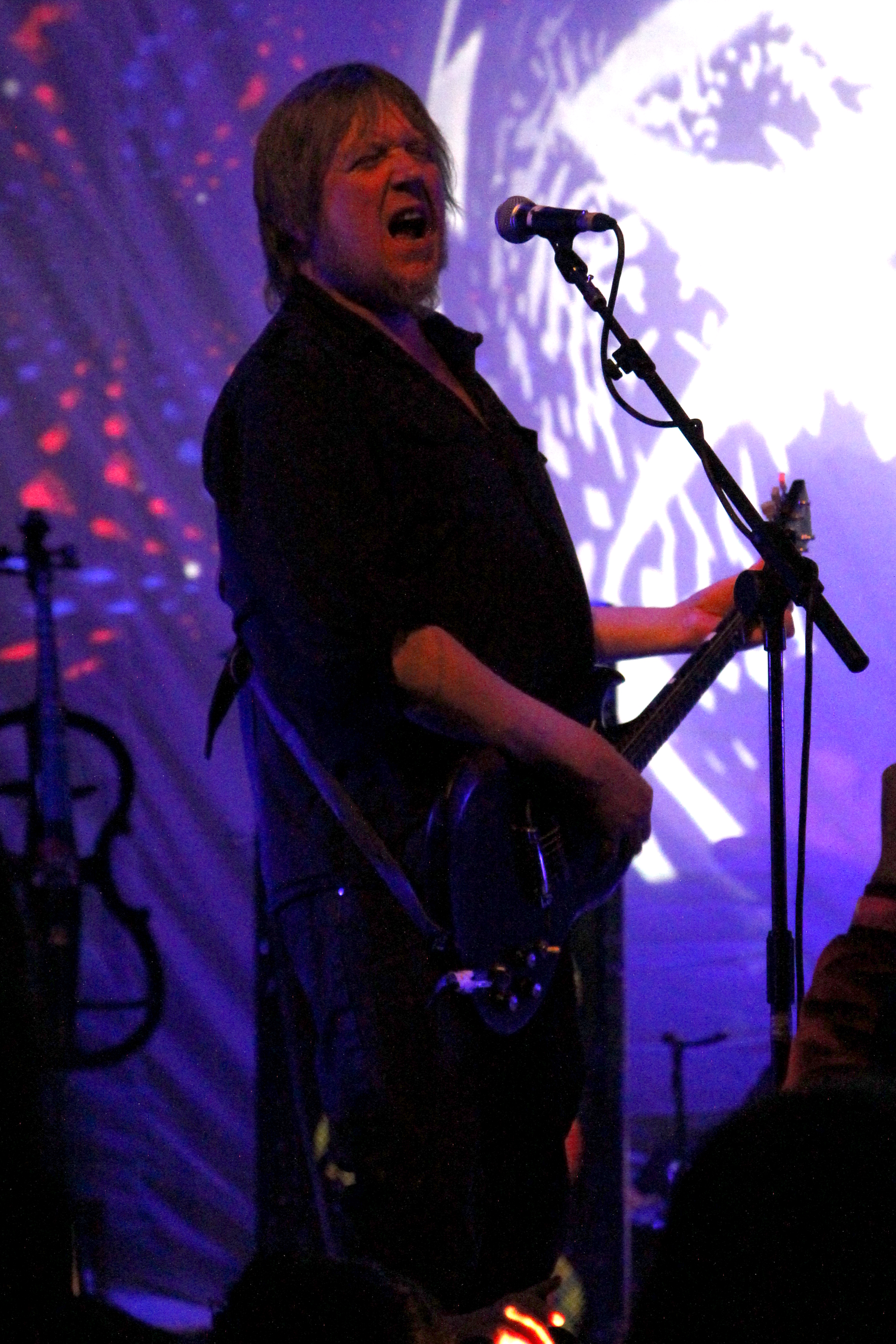
- Niall Hone playing with Hawkwind at Hawkeaster 2014

Background information
- Born: 24 June 1970 (age 55)
- Genres: Space rock; progressive rock; electronic dance
- Occupation: Musician
- Instruments: Bass; keyboards; guitar; vocals
- Years active: 1986–present

Niall Hone (born 24 June 1970) is an English musician, best known as a member of the UK space rock band Hawkwind from 2008 to 2017, and May 2018–2021. Hone has also been heavily involved in electronic dance music since the early 1990s.

== Music career ==
Early in his career, Hone played bass guitar in several notable groups, including Mandragora, Captain Sensible's band. He also played lead guitar in Tribe of Cro.

In 2008 Hone joined Hawkwind following the death of keyboardist Jason Stuart, first performing with the band on their December 2008 UK tour. On this tour, he primarily played guitar, whilst additionally playing synthesizers and bass. Since May 2011, he has been the band's primary bassist and live electronic manipulator (using Ableton Live) with former bassist Mr Dibs now assuming the role of lead vocalist, occasionally playing cello and second bass. Hone plays Music Man StingRay and Fender Precision bass guitars.

Hawkwind released four studio albums with Hone, Blood of the Earth (2010), Onward (2012), The Machine Stops (2016) and All Aboard the Skylark (2019) and one compilation album including new material, Spacehawks (2013).

A slimmed down offshoot of the group featuring Hone on bass, Dave Brock on guitar and Richard Chadwick on drums, released a separate album, Stellar Variations (2012) under the moniker Hawkwind Light Orchestra.

Home appeared on the Space Ritual Live album in 2014.

Hone left Hawkwind in January 2017 but returned in May 2018 as bassist following the departure of Haz Wheaton to join Electric Wizard. While he does not appear on that year's Road to Utopia, he has been involved in touring the album with orchestral support and direction from Mike Batt.

Niall played bass on the 2019 album All Aboard the Skylark and Hawkwind undertook their 50th Anniversary tour ending with date at The Royal Albert Hall in November.

Hone is the founder of the space rock / psych rock band, 'Lords of Form'. Members are Hone, Ross Fuller & Jamie Gillett.

== Discography ==
Selected recordings include:

=== Mandragora ===
- Over the Moon (1988)
- Head First (1991)
- Earth Dance (1992)

=== Cherokee Mist ===
- Gathering of the Tribes (1994)
- Anthem of the Moon (1997)

=== Captain Sensible ===
- "MeatHead"

=== Tribe Of Cro ===
- "Sporadic Spiro-Gyra" (EBS 1996, EBSCD 125)
- Hydroculture (1998)
- "Mavacanto Flavourslime"

=== Hawkwind ===
- Blood of the Earth (2010)
- Onward (2012)
- Spacehawks (2013)
- Space Ritual Live (2014)
- The Machine Stops (2016)
- All Aboard the Skylark (2019)
- ’’50 Live’’

=== Hawkwind Light Orchestra ===
- Stellar Variations (2012)

=== Crippled Black Phoenix ===
- "New Dark Age (2015)"
- "Destroy Freak Valley (2016)"
- "An Original Album Collection (2019)"

=== Lords Of Form ===
- ”Staring Downwards EP1 (2020)”
- ”Its Revolution Time EP2 (2021)”
- "Flying Chromium Society - Full Length Album - CD and Digital Download. (2022)"
- "23 Strangers - Full Length Album - CD and Digital Download. (2023)"
