= Rust Red September =

Studio album by Eyeless in Gaza
- Released: 1983
- Studio: Woodbine Street Recording Studios
- Label: Cherry Red
- Producer: John A. Rivers

Eyeless in Gaza chronology
Drumming the Beating Heart (1982)	Rust Red September (1983)	Back from the Rains (1986)

Rust Red September is the fifth album by English band Eyeless in Gaza, released in 1983 by record label Cherry Red. This was the first recording where Eyeless In Gaza employed overdubs, as all their previous releases were recorded in one take straight to tape.

== Track listing ==
Side one
No.	Title	Length
1.	"Changing Stations"	2:23
2.	"Pearl and Pale"	3:27
3.	"New Risen"	2:48
4.	"September Hills"	3:46
5.	"Taking Steps"	3:25
6.	"Only Whispers"	4:32

Side two
No.	Title	Length
1.	"Leaves Are Dancing"	3:12
2.	"No Perfect Stranger"	4:45
3.	"Corner of Dusk"	3:49
4.	"Bright Play of Eyes"	3:20
5.	"Stealing Autumn"	4:33

== Reception ==
Professional ratings
Review scores
Source	Rating
AllMusic	4.5/5 stars
Sounds	mixed-to-favourable

Sounds wrote "With 'Rust Red September', Eyeless in Gaza have stumbled over a devastatingly simple truth, but haven't yet learnt how to harness it for their best purposes. Still, it makes (occasionally) great listening until they come up with their real masterpiece."

Smash Hits editor Neil Tennant gave the album a 7 out of 10 rating and described its content as "Rich, sensual songs with poetic words by a duo from Nuneaton. They produce a big sound on a small scale with a low budget, and too often the music drags where it should soar, but there’s some unusual and fiery talent on display."

In an AllMusic review Ned Raggett wrote: "Rust Red September finds the group further moving away from the brusquer hooks of its earliest days to a calmer reflectiveness. If anything, the duo also achieved a light, airy pop feeling with this album".
