= Drumming the Beating Heart =

Studio album by Eyeless in Gaza
- Released: 1982
- Studio: Woodbine Street Recording Studios
- Label: Cherry Red
- Producer: John A. Rivers

Eyeless in Gaza chronology
Pale Hands I Loved So Well (1982)	Drumming the Beating Heart (1982)	Rust Red September (1983)

Drumming the Beating Heart is the fourth album by English band Eyeless in Gaza, released in 1982 by record label Cherry Red.

== Content ==
Regarding the album's style, AllMusic wrote that the album "finds the Nuneaton duo fashioning their stock sonic components into more immediately accessible, conventional song structures, albeit at the avant end of the pop spectrum".

== Reception ==
Professional ratings
Review scores
Source	Rating
AllMusic	3/5 stars
Smash Hits	unfavourable
Trouser Press	favourable

NME called it "so much better than their previous sluggish experiments not because it’s more “commercial”, but because the endeavour required to redesign their form clarifies and strengthens it."

== Track listing ==
All tracks composed by Martyn Bates and Peter Becker

1. "Transience Blues"
2. "Ill-Wind Blows"
3. "One By One"
4. "Picture the Day"
5. "Dreaming at Rain"
6. "Two"
7. "Veil Like Calm"
8. "Throw a Shadow"
9. "Pencil Sketch"
10. "At Arms Length"
11. "Lights of April"
12. "Before You Go"
