= Space Ritual Live =

Live album by Hawkwind
- Released: 25 March 2015
- Recorded: 22 February 2014
- Venues: O2 Shepherd's Bush Empire, London
- Genre: Space rock
- Label: Gonzo Media
- Producer: Hawkwind

Hawkwind chronology
Spacehawks (2013)	Space Ritual Live (2015)

Space Ritual Live is a live album by Hawkwind recorded at the O2 Shepherd's Bush Empire in London on 22 February 2014 and released in March 2015. It is released as an audio (2×CD) and video (2×DVD). The concert was in aid of various animal rights groups.

== Track listing ==
1. "Seasons" (Darbyshire, Hone, Chadwick)
2. "Steppenwolf" (Calvert, Brock)
3. "Utopia" (Brock, Moorcock)
4. "Opa Loka" (Hawkwind 2014)
5. "Spiral Galaxy" (House)
6. "Reefer Madness" (Calvert, Brock)
7. "Sentinel" (Darbyshire, Hone, Chadwick)
8. "Spirit of the Age" (Calvert, Brock)
9. "Earth Calling" (Brock, Chadwick, Hone, Darbyshire, Reeves, Blake)
10. "Born to Go" (Calvert, Brock)
11. "Down Through The Night" (Brock)
12. "Poem 1st Landing" (Calvert)
13. "Lord of Light" (Brock)
14. "Poem Black Corridor" (Moorcock)
15. "Space Is Deep" (Brock)
16. "A Step Into Space" (Brock, Chadwick, Hone, Darbyshire, Reeves, Blake)
17. "Orgone Accumulator" (Calvert, Brock)
18. "Upside Down" (Brock)
19. "10th Second of Forever" (Calvert)
20. "Brainstorm" (Turner)
21. "Seven By Seven" (Brock)
22. "Sonic Attack" (Moorcock, Hawkwind 2014)
23. "Time We Left" (Brock)
24. "Master of the Universe" (Brock, Turner)
25. "Welcome to the Future" (Calvert)

== Personnel ==
Hawkwind

- Mr Dibs – bass guitar, vocals
- Richard Chadwick – drums, vocals
- Dead Fred – keyboards, violin
- Tim Blake – keyboards, theremin
- Niall Hone – bass guitar, guitar, vocals
- Dave Brock – guitar, keyboards, vocals
- John Etheridge – guitar
- Brian Blessed – vocals (Sonic attack)

== Charts ==
Chart (2015)	Peak position
UK Rock & Metal Albums (Official Charts)	34

== Release history ==
- March 2015: Gonzo Media – 2×CD and 1×DVD
- March 2015: Gonzo Media – 2×CD and 2×DVD (Special Edition)
