= Blake's New Jerusalem =

Studio album by Tim Blake
- Released: 1978
- Recorded: Spring to Summer, 1978
- Studio: Ridge Farm Studios, Studios Barclay-Hoche Enregistrements, L'Aquarium Studios
- Label: Barclay Records
- Producer: Tim Blake

Tim Blake chronology
| Crystal Machine (1977) | Blake's New Jerusalem (1978) | Magick (1991) |

Blake's New Jerusalem is an album by Tim Blake, recorded and originally released in 1978 on Barclay.

The album was remastered and expanded in 2017, adding three more tracks.

The title is a reference to the popular British hymn "Jerusalem", which is based on William Blake's 1804 poem "And did those feet in ancient time".

Tim Blake performed the tracks "Lighthouse" and "Blake's New Jerusalem" live with Hawkwind. "A Song for a New Age" was covered by Hawkwind bandmates Dave Brock, Niall Hone and Richard Chadwick under the name Hawkwind Light Orchestra for the album Stellar Variations.

== Track listing ==
1. "Song for a New age" — 5:12
2. "Lighthouse" — 6:46
3. "Generator (Laserbeam)" — 3:34
4. "Passage sur la Cité de la Révélation" — 7:43
5. "Blake's New Jerusalem" — 16:12

== Remastered edition additional tracks, 2017 ==
1. "The Woodland Voice" - 3:39
2. "From Outer Space" - 19:09
3. "Jupiter to Jerusalem" - 16:07

== Personnel ==
  - As listed in liner notes on back cover:
- Tim Blake: Vocals, Acoustic and Electric Guitars, EMS Custom Synthesizers, Roland 100 System, Mini-Moog, ARP Omni and Korg Polyphonic Ensembles
- Jean-Phillipe Rykiel: Mini-Moog Synthesizers on "Passage sur la Cité de la Révélation" and "Blake's New Jerusalem"
