= Caught in Flux =

Studio album by Eyeless in Gaza
- Released: September 1981
- Recorded: February 1981
- Studio: Woodbine Street Recording Studios Leamington Spa
- Genre: Post-punk
- Label: Cherry Red
- Producer: John A. Rivers

Eyeless in Gaza chronology
Photographs as Memories (1981)	Caught in Flux (1981)	Pale Hands I Loved So Well (1982)

Caught in Flux is the second album by English band Eyeless in Gaza, recorded in February, 1981, and released in September, 1981 by record label Cherry Red. It was recorded in one take with no overdubs at Woodbine Recording Studios Leamington Spa UK. The Album included a five-song EP called "The Eyes of Beautiful Losers".

== Track listing ==
All tracks written by Eyeless in Gaza (Martyn Bates & Peter Becker)

Side A
No.	Title	Length
1.	"Sixth Sense"	3:32
2.	"Point You"	2:33
3.	"Voice From the Tracks"	4:03
4.	"Scale Amiss"	3:02
5.	"The Decoration"	2:45
6.	"Continual"	4:22

Side B
No.	Title	Length
7.	"Soul on Thin Ice"	2:43
8.	"Rose Petal Knot"	2:11
9.	"Skeletal Framework"	3:32
10.	"See Red"	2:45
11.	"Half-Light"	3:20
12.	"Every Which Way"	5:03

The Eyes Of Beautiful Losers EP
No.	Title	Length
13.	"The Eyes Of Beautiful Losers"	5:16
14.	"Still Air"	3:38
15.	"Out From Day To Day"	2:56
16.	"True Colour"	4:14
17.	"Keynote Inertia"	2:32

== Critical reception ==
Professional ratings
Review scores
Source	Rating
AllMusic	1.5/5 stars
New Musical Express	favourable
Trouser Press	mixed
Uncut	favourable

In a positive review in New Musical Express, Mick Duffy described Caught In Flux as a progress from Eyeless in Gaza's debut album: "‘Caught In Flux’ is most specifically an introspective LP, a thoughtful compilation of new songs and sound patterns, skilfully patched together and performed, It's a meditative music for active minds, an exciting vision of a brave new whirl."

== Personnel ==
- Martyn Bates - Lead Vocals, Fender Telecaster Guitar, Organ
- Peter Becker - Hofner 500/1 Bass, Electronic Dream Plant Wasp Synth, Drums
