= Photographs as Memories =

Studio album by Eyeless in Gaza
- Released: 30 January 1981
- Recorded: W.M.R.S Leamington SDA
- Studio: Woodbine Street Recording Studios
- Genre: Post-punk
- Label: Cherry Red
- Producer: John Rivers

Eyeless in Gaza chronology
Photographs as Memories (1981)	Caught in Flux (1981)

Photographs as Memories is the debut studio album by English band Eyeless in Gaza. It was released on 30 January 1981, through record label Cherry Red.

== Track listing ==
All tracks are written by Eyeless in Gaza (Pete Becker, Martyn Bates).

Side A
No.	Title	Length
1.	"Seven Years"
2.	"Fixation"
3.	"Looking Daggers"
4.	"From A. to B."
5.	"Clear Cut Apparently"
6.	"Speech Rapid Fire"
7.	"John of Patmos"

Side B
No.	Title	Length
1.	"Knives Replace Air"
2.	"Faceless"
3.	"In Your Painting"
4.	"A Keepsake"
5.	"Whitewash"
6.	"No Noise"

== Reception ==
Professional ratings
Review scores
Source	Rating
AllMusic	2/5 stars
Melody Maker	favourable
NME	unfavourable
Record Mirror	unfavourable
Sounds	generally favourable
Trouser Press	favourable

Photographs as Memories received mixed reviews on its release, from “An interesting, invigorating listen” (Melody Maker) to “Stinkingly awful” (Record Mirror). Des Moines in Sounds noted "a lot of flaws" and Martyn Bates' "extremely challenging voice", but acknowledged that "'From A to B’, ‘Speech Rapid Fire’ and ‘No Noise’ are three representations of how Becker (£200 Wasp synthesiser, voice, percussion, violin, stylophone, ‘treated tapes’) and Bates (voice, electric guitar, plastic organ, soprano sax) at full flow achieve their thoroughly magic melodies", and that "Becker's uncanny flair for compelling succinct synthesiser hook lines is the conspicuous characteristic, but Bates’ imperiously evocative vocal is a factor just as crucial." While dismissing "John of Patmos" and "In Your Painting" as "rubbish", the reviewer acknowledged that "the highspots of the album are truly staggering".

Retrospectively, AllMusic described the album's "non-style-over-substance sense of work ethic" as "frustrating". Trouser Press described it as a "better-than-decent stab at hook-filled spareness".

== Personnel ==
- Pete Becker – unspecified instrumentation, vocals, production
- Martyn Bates – unspecified instrumentation, vocals, production

Technical

- John Rivers – engineering
- Jim Jag – sleeve artwork
