= All Aboard the Skylark =

Album by Hawkwind

Studio album by Hawkwind
- Released: 25 October 2019
- Genre: Space rock
- Length: 91:23
- Label: Cherry Red
- Producer: Hawkwind

Hawkwind chronology
Road to Utopia (2018)	All Aboard the Skylark (2019)	50 Live (2020)

All Aboard the Skylark is an album by space rock band Hawkwind; released in 2019 on Cherry Red Records, it was their thirty-second album since their debut, Hawkwind, in 1970.

== Background ==
Some copies were issued as a 2CD set with an additional disc Acoustic Daze, which was also issued as an independent vinyl record. The content is the original acoustic recordings that were reworked with Mike Batt for the Road to Utopia album.

The album was promoted with a 15 date tour of Britain in November, culminating in a final show at London's Royal Albert Hall. The group were augmented by keyboard player Tim Blake, with guest appearances from Phil Campbell (at the Royal Albert Hall and Cardiff Tramshed) and Eric Clapton (in Guildford). The set-list included "Flesh Fondue", "Last Man on Earth", "65 Million Years Ago", "In the Beginning" and "The Fantasy of Faldum" from the album. A record of the live show titled 50th Anniversary Live, with the guest appearance from Campbell, was released on 4 December 2020 by Cherry Red in 3LP and 2CD formats.

On 14 November, the group recorded a session for Marc Riley's BBC Radio 6 Music show, playing "65 Million Years Ago", "Last Man on Earth", and "Spirit of the Age". "Silver Machine" was recorded as part of the session for broadcast on the Gideon Coe show later the same evening.

The album reached number 34 in the UK albums chart.

== Tracks ==
All tracks written by Dave Brock unless otherwise stated

=== Disc 1 ===
1. "Flesh Fondue" – 5:03
2. "Nets of Space" – 3:03
3. "Last Man on Earth" (Magnus Martin) – 5:01
4. "We Are Not Dead... Only Sleeping" – 3:21
5. "All Aboard the Skylark" (Brock, Martin, Niall Hone, Richard Chadwick) – 5:26
6. "65 Million Years Ago" – 4:11
7. "In the Beginning" – 2:00
8. "The Road To..." – 5:13
9. "The Fantasy of Faldum" (Martin) – 9:15

=== Disc 2: Acoustic Daze ===
1. "Psi Power" (Brock, Robert Calvert) – 5:16
2. "Hymn to the Sun" (Martin) – 2:49
3. "The Watcher" (Ian Kilmister) – 4:54
4. "Generation Door" – 0:41
5. "Age of the Micro Man" (Brock, Calvert) – 5:08
6. "Intro the Night" (Martin) – 2:11
7. "Down Through the Night" – 6:12
8. "Flying Doctor" (Brock, Calvert) – 5:47
9. "Get Yourself Together" – 7:00
10. "Ascent of Man" – 5:04
11. "We Took the Wrong Step Years Ago" – 3:53

== Personnel ==
Hawkwind

- Dave Brock – vocals, guitar, keyboards, synthesiser, harmonica
- Magnus Martin – vocals, guitar, keyboards, viola
- Niall Hone – bass guitar (Disc 1)
- Richard Chadwick – drums, percussion, vocals

Additional musicians

- Michal Sosna – saxophone ("Last Man On Earth", "All Aboard The Skylark", "Get Yourself Together" and "Ascent of Man")
- Haz Wheaton – bass guitar (Disc 2)
- Mr Dibs (Jonathan Darbyshire) – vocals ("Flying Doctor"), backing vocals ("Get Yourself Together", "Ascent of Man" and "We Took The Wrong Step Years Ago")

Technical

- Producer – Hawkwind
- Artwork – Martin Krel
- Layout [Packaging] – Meriel Waissman
- Co-ordinator – Kris Tait

== Title ==
According to Dave Brock, speaking during the live session on the Marc Riley show, the title is taken from the Skylark series by E. E. "Doc" Smith.

However, it has also been speculated and assumed that the title may in reality be more directly influenced by the British Kids TV cartoon of the 1970s 'Noah and Nelly' who flew the Skylark, and used the familiar catchphrase call of 'All aboard the SkylArk' in each episode.

== Charts ==
Chart (2019)	Peak position
Scottish Albums (OCC)	16
UK Albums (OCC)	34
UK Independent Albums (OCC)	4
UK Rock & Metal Albums (OCC)	1
