= The Tights =

English punk rock band

The Tights are an English punk rock band from Worcester. The band's only two singles were released by the Cherry Red Records label: "Bad Hearts" / "It" / "Cracked" (1978) and "Howard Hughes" / "China's Eternal" (1978). After John Peel played "Bad Hearts" on BBC Radio 1, this single made it to number six in the UK punk chart. Follow-up "Howard Hughes" reached number four in the same chart. After playing their farewell gig at the Marquee Club, London, The Tights split in 1979. In a rarely heard BBC Blackburn interview from 1980, Ian Curtis of Joy Division expressed his liking for the work of The Tights.

In 2004 the band reformed.

Bass player Barry Island (a.k.a. Gary Marsden) has gone on to record an album called "Killing Without Touching" with his band Threshing Ground, who have gained popularity in Australia with singles: "I'm in Love With a Girl Called Vinyl" and "last Beer in Bondi".

== Single covers ==
- The cover picture of the "Howard Hughes" single features the limo of Charlie Watts (the drummer of The Rolling Stones).
- The cover picture of "Bad Hearts Cracked It" features Susie Bateman (daughter of the countertenor Grayston Burgess).

== Band members ==
- Rob Banks (guitars)
- Barry Island (bass guitar and keyboards)
- Rick Mayhew (drums)
- Malcolm Orgee (vocals)

Rick Mayhew was later replaced by Mark Simon
