= Onward (album) =

Studio album by Hawkwind
- Released: 30 April 2012
- Recorded: Earth Studios
- Genre: Space rock; progressive rock
- Length: 81:28
- Label: Eastworld Recordings
- Producer: Hawkwind

Hawkwind chronology
Blood of the Earth (2010)	Onward (2012)	The Machine Stops (2016)

Professional ratings
Review scores
Source	Rating
subba-cultcha.com	8/10

Onward is the twenty seventh studio album and a double-album by British space rock band Hawkwind. It was released in April 2012 by Eastworld Recordings.

== Track listing ==
No.	Title	Writer(s)	Length
1.	"Seasons"	Chadwick, Darbyshire, Hone	5:37
2.	"The Hills Have Ears"	Hone, Chadwick, Brock	5:08
3.	"Mind Cut"	Brock	4:54
4.	"System Check"	Hawkwind - 2011	1:06
5.	"Death Trap"	Brock, Robert Calvert	3:31
6.	"Southern Cross"	Blake	6:41
7.	"The Prophecy"	Brock	4:11
8.	"Electric Tears"	Brock	0:56
9.	"The Drive By"	Brock	4:39
10.	"Computer Cowards"	Brock	5:25
11.	"Howling Moon"	Brock	2:11
12.	"Right to Decide*"	Brock, Alan Davey	6:30
13.	"Aerospace Age*"	Calvert, Hawkwind 2008	5:51
14.	"The Flowering of the Rose*"	Hawkwind 2008	8:21
15.	"Trans Air Trucking"	Brock, Blake	2:36
16.	"Deep Vents"	Brock	0:32
17.	"Green Finned Demon"	Brock, Calvert	5:25
18.	"."		7:54
Total length:			81:28

- * - Bonus live tracks

== Personnel ==
Hawkwind

- Dave Brock – guitar, synthesizer, vocals, bass
- Richard Chadwick – drums, vocals
- Tim Blake – keyboards, theremin, bass
- Mr. Dibs – bass, vocals
- Niall Hone – bass, synthesis, sequencing, guitar
- Jason Stuart – keyboards (12,13,14)
- Huw Lloyd-Langton – guitar (2)

== Charts ==
Chart (2012)	Peak position
Scottish Albums (OCC)	88
UK Albums (OCC)	75
UK Independent Albums (OCC)	13
