= Back from the Rains =

Studio album by Eyeless in Gaza
- Released: 1986
- Label: Cherry Red
- Producer: John Brand

Eyeless in Gaza chronology
| Rust Red September (1983) | Back from the Rains (1986) | Fabulous Library (1993), Orchid |

Professional ratings
Review scores
| Source | Rating |
|---|---|
| AllMusic | 4/5 stars |
| Trouser Press | favourable |

Back from the Rains is the sixth album by English band Eyeless in Gaza, released in 1986 by record label Cherry Red.

== Critical reception ==
"The final Eyeless in Gaza release before the duo's temporary split, Back from the Rains builds on the pop sense of Rust Red September excellently. Beginning with the brief a cappella piece "Between These Dreams," Bates' vocals treated with a bit of a hollow-room sound that creates some subtly effective drama, the duo shifts into the bright, almost straightforward glow of "Twilight," a fine representation of the album as a whole... [Bates] and Becker, as always, make an excellent team, the latter surrounding the former's vocal and guitar parts with detailed, energetic arrangements and overdubs. "Catch Me" and the soul-touched "Welcome Now" may have straight-up rhythms for once, but it's still a meta-pop of the kind that could chart high but never does." – Ned Raggett, AllMusic

"Back from the Rains has a charming, Aztec Camera-like beat-pop sound; Bates’ vocals aren’t quite up to it, but the duo (aided by a drummer and a female backing singer) shows a real facility for shimmering studio arrangements. Just shy of being commercial, this is nonetheless a delight." – Trouser Press

== Track listing ==
All tracks composed by Martyn Bates and Peter Becker

1. "Between These Dreams"
2. "Twilight"
3. "Back from the Rains"
4. "Lie Still, Sleep Long"
5. "Catch Me"
6. "Evening Music"
7. "She Moves Thru the Fair"
8. "Sweet Life Longer"
9. "New Love Here"
10. "Welcome Now"
11. "Your Rich Sky"
12. "Flight of Swallows"
13. "My Last, Lost Melody"
