= The Seers =

British rock group

- Origin: Bristol, United Kingdom
- Genres: Alternative rock, psychedelic rock, garage rock
- Years active: 1984–1991
- Labels: Skullfuck Records, Hedd Records, Cherry Red Records, Rough Trade Records
- Past members: Adrian Blackmore, Jason Collins, Kat, Spider, Leigh Wildman

The Seers were a British rock group active between 1984 and 1991.

The group gained notoriety with their debut single, "Lightning Strikes", which was about the Hungerford massacre. In 1988 they became the first unsigned band to play the main stage at the Reading Festival.

== Personnel ==
- Adrian "Age" Blackmore (drums)
- Jason Collins (bass guitar, backing vocals)
- Clive "Kat" Day (guitar)
- Steve "Spider" Croom (vocals)
- Leigh Wildman (guitar)

== Discography ==
=== Albums ===
- Psych Out (Cherry Red Records, 1990)
- Peace Crazies (Cherry Red Records, 1992)
- Live in Europe 1990 (Bristol Archive Records)
- Live in Bristol 1991 (Bristol Archive Records)

=== Singles ===
- "Lightning Strikes" (Rough Trade Records, 1988)
- "Freedom Trip" (Skullfuck Records, 1988)
- "Sun is in the Sky" (Hedd Records, 1990)
- "Welcome to Deadtown" / "Rub Me Out" (Cherry Red Records, 1990)
- "Fear of Technology" EP (Cherry Red Records, 1990)
