= Five or Six =

- Origin: London, England
- Genres: Post-punk
- Labels: Cherry Red; Edigsa; Frizz Bee

Five or Six were an English post-punk band, originally signed to Cherry Red Records by A&R head Mike Alway, who deemed them to be the act with the most potential from the scene he had helped create around the Snoopies club in south-west London. In addition to the singles they released with Cherry Red, they recorded two albums, A Thriving and Happy Land and Cántame esa canción que dice, Yeah, Yeah, Yeah, neither of which was released in the UK. The line-up was fluid. One of their songs was included on the compilation album Pillows & Prayers.

John Yorke became a senior executive for both Channel Four and the BBC and is currently head of independent drama. Dave Harper is involved in the management of bands including Goldfrapp. His brother, Simon Harper, became head of international at 4AD. Dave Knight and Ashley Wales joined Karl Blake as members of the Shock Headed Peters, with Wales then proceeding to dance/jazz duo Spring Heel Jack. Knight later worked with Lydia Lunch and Danielle Dax, records solo under the name Arkkon, and with Stephen Thrower (Coil, Cyclobe) in UnicaZürn.

In 2008, Cherry Red released a retrospective anthology, entitled Acting on Impulse: The Best of Five or Six.

== Discography ==
Studio albums

- A Thriving and Happy Land (1982)
- Cántame esa canción que dice, Yeah, Yeah, Yeah (1982)

Compilations

- Acting on Impulse: The Best of Five or Six (2008)

Singles and EPs

- "Another Reason" / "The Trial" (1981)
- Polar Exposure (1981)
- Four from Five or Six (1982)

Compilation appearances

- "Folded", on Perspectives and Distortion (1981)
- "Portrait" on Pillows & Prayers (1982)
- "Aroma" on Rising from the Red Sand (1983)
