= Grab Grab the Haddock =

- Origin: Hatfield, Hertfordshire, England
- Genres: Indie pop
- Years active: 1984–1985
- Label: Cherry Red
- Past members: Jane Fox; Alice Fox; Lester Noel; Steve Galloway; Tim Hall

Grab Grab the Haddock were an English indie pop group that was formed in 1984.

== History ==
When the Marine Girls disbanded in 1983, the band members Jane Fox (bass) and Alice Fox (vocals and percussion) formed Grab Grab the Haddock with Lester Noel (guitar and vocals), Steve Galloway (guitar) and Tim Hall (saxophone and clarinet). The name of the band came from the title of a painting by the artist Bruce McLean. In 2003, the band came top in a listeners poll on the Mark and Lard show on BBC Radio 1 to find the "worst band name of all time".

The single "I’m Used Now" was released in 1984 on Cherry Red Records, along with the EP Three Songs By Grab Grab the Haddock. In 1985, A second single "The Last Fond Goodbye" was included in the EP Four More Songs By Grab Grab the Haddock. Tracks from both EPs have subsequently appeared on many Cherry Red compilation albums. Lester Noel and Steve Galloway went on to form the band North of Cornwallis, while Noel later joined Norman Cook in the electronic music group, Beats International.

== Discography ==
Singles

- "I’m Used Now" (1984)
- "The Last Fond Goodbye" (1985)

EPs

- Three Songs By Grab Grab the Haddock (1984)
- Four More Songs By Grab Grab the Haddock (1985)

Various artists compilation albums

- Pillows & Prayers 2 (1984)
- And Suddenly It's Evening (1986, Cherry Red)
- Cherry Red For Café Après-Midi (2002, Cherry Red)
- A Fine Day & A Brilliant Evening (2003, CDM RED 230)
- Ambition - Volumes 1 & 2 - The History Of Cherry Red Records 1978 – 1988 (2005, Cherry Red)
- Scared To Get Happy (A Story Of Indie-Pop 1980-1989) (2013, Cherry Red)
- Sharon Signs To Cherry Red (2016, Cherry Red)
