= Eyeless in Gaza (band) =

English musical duo

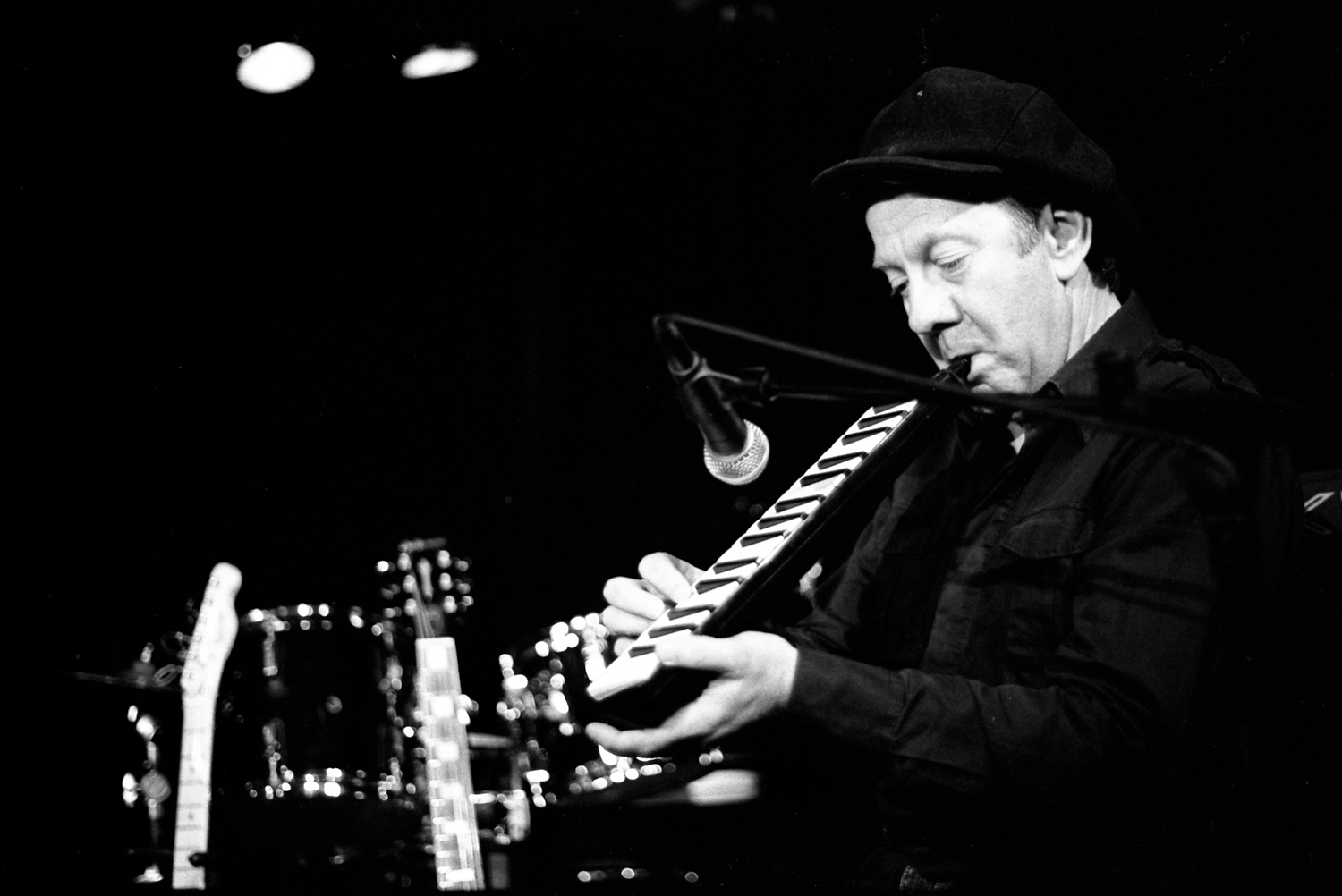
- Peter Becker of Eyeless in Gaza, 2010

Background information
- Origin: Nuneaton, Warwickshire, England
- Genres: Post-punk; experimental; art rock; alternative rock; new wave
- Years active: 1980–1987, 1992–present
- Labels: Cherry Red, Ambivalent Scale
- Members: Martyn Bates; Peter Becker; Elizabeth S. (occasional member)
- Past members: Joby Palmer
- Website: www.eyelessingaza.com

Eyeless in Gaza are an English musical duo of Martyn Bates and Peter Becker, based in Nuneaton, Warwickshire. They have described their music as "veer[ing] crazily from filmic ambiance to rock and pop, industrial funk to avant-folk styles." Formed in 1980, the group went into hiatus in 1987, re-emerging in 1993.

== History ==
=== 1979–1982: Avant-garde beginnings ===
Martyn Bates had grown up in Bedworth, England, in a staunchly Methodist family with "undercurrents of magic", and had listened to folk music from an early age, subsequently being inspired by the first wave of post-punk. He was in a very early lineup of the Coventry-based band Reluctant Stereotypes, and also released a cassette of experimental electronic music in 1979 under the name of Migraine Inducers. Peter Becker had played in a covers band before buying and experimenting with a Wasp synthesizer (he released a solo cassette-album in June 1980 and a second a year later).

Bates was working as a hospital porter and Becker as a laboratory technician when the two met, having simultaneously been turned down for membership in the Nuneaton band Bron Area. They began making music together as Eyeless in Gaza in February 1980, both singing and playing multiple instruments. The band name is a reference to the novel Eyeless in Gaza by Aldous Huxley (which in turn was influenced by John Milton's Samson Agonistes).

Early sessions resulted in the tracks included on their first EP, Kodak Ghosts Run Amok, which they pressed, packaged and marketed entirely by themselves, inspired by the manufacturing and promotion instructions provided on Scritti Politti's Skank Bloc Bologna EP. Bates later acknowledged their origin as a band from the "independent scene". Within a year Eyeless in Gaza had recorded two albums and set up their own record label, Ambivalent Scale, in order to release limited edition cassettes of assorted solo works, other local Nuneaton groups and each member's separate collaborations with other musicians. (Both Becker and Bates released solo albums on cassettes between 1979 and 1981.)

Following the release of "Kodak Ghosts Run Amok", Eyeless in Gaza signed to Cherry Red Records, releasing their debut album Photographs as Memories in February 1981. Briefly intended to feature with Classix Nouveaux, Theatre of Hate, Shock, and Naked Lunch in the 2002 Review package tour of that year, they decided to pull out, having decided that "futurism (was) not for Eyeless in Gaza." For the next two years, they would pursue a resolutely independent path of their own as regards both recording and playing live, and deliberately retaining their day jobs.

The duo became known for their unconventional arrangements and instrumentation (which sometimes included toy instruments for reasons of cheapness and sonic effectiveness) and for Bates' passionate vocals, which at times were howled, whispered, or stammered. Bates would later reflect that the early music and his singing style was a way of liberating the rage and hostility he had within him. Becker would later recall that "the music was always constantly changing in style: punk, thrashy, atmospheric, ambient, dense, sparse, folky, poppy and even a tinge of avant-garde."

The second Eyeless in Gaza album, Caught in Flux was released in September 1981 to some highly positive reviews in the British music press. The original pressing included a bonus five track EP (The Eyes Of Beautiful Losers).

Eyeless in Gaza would release two further EPs in 1981, Invisibility and Others. By the end of the year, they had completed their third album, Pale Hands I Loved So Well, which was released by the Norwegian label Uniton in 1982: in contrast to previous works it was (as described by Dave Henderson in Sounds) an album of "short but effective soundtracks; not for films but for everyday life.", it received less positive reviews by other critics. Despite this productivity on record, during this period the duo would also perform numerous songs in live concerts which were never released on records. In 1982, Bates would release his first full-release solo album on 10 inch vinyl, Letters Written.

1982's Drumming the Beating Heart (released, like the first two albums, on Cherry Red) saw Eyeless in Gaza refining their sound and attracting broader coverage. In a mixed critical response, one critic compared the band to "a more harrowing version of OMD". A single from the album - the electro-soul influenced "Veil Like Calm" was issued in October 1982. In the same year the band recorded The Home Produce/Country Bizarre, a split album with Lol Coxhill released on limited edition cassette via the Tago Mago label.

=== 1983–1987: Shift towards pop ===
By the time of the "New Risen" single (released in May 1983) and its parent album Rust Red September (July 1983), Eyeless in Gaza had become concerned that their initial uncompromising stance had "alienated a lot of people" and had begun to make concessions towards a more pop-oriented direction. Bates would begin to adopt a gentler singing style as part of this, and physical aspects of his earlier singing style was another reason for this. More of this new approach was evident on the 1984 EP Sun Bursts In, which brought comparisons to contemporary pop optimist Howard Jones (as well as an unlikely Single of the Week accolade from Joe Leeway of Thompson Twins).

For their 1985 single "Welcome Now" the band employed Aztec Camera's drummer Dave Ruffy: this song would in turn appear on the final album of the band's early years, 1986's Back From the Rains, for which former Sinatras/In Embrace drummer Joby Palmer was recruited, as was Bates' longtime girlfriend Elizabeth S. (who served as backing singer). In the same year, the band acquired a manager for the first time and toured with Depeche Mode., but in spite of this opportunity and the band's embracing of the option of a pop career, no major label deal emerged.

In 1989, Bates would recall that both he and Becker had seemed to feel that the band had peaked with the title track of Back From the Rains and no longer needed to continue. "Recording that song was one of my proudest moments with Gaza. The track was just so wonderful it seemed to epitomize everything that Peter and I thought was wonderful about music. It was almost, "well, we’ve done it now, we can finish the group." It wasn't intended that way, but it was a good, full stop." Four years later, Becker would recall things differently, stating that the band had broken up due to frustration with their failure to advance their career.

Eyeless in Gaza played their final gig in Reus, Spain in 1987, with the concert being filmed for Spanish TV. Cherry Red released the retrospective collection Kodak Ghosts Run Amok-–Chronological Singles, etc., 1980-86 in 1987.

=== 1987–1992: Hiatus ===
Following the split, Becker married and temporarily relocated to Spain. Bates and Elizabeth S. were also married by this point, and Bates had begun concentrating on solo work. Between 1987 and 1990, he would release three folk-based solo albums, The Return of the Quiet, Love Smashed on a Rock and Letters to a Scattered Family.

In 1990, Bates and Becker reunited to collaborate on what was in effect a new Eyeless in Gaza epic, "Glow of Sight", for inclusion at the end of Stars Come Trembling, Bates’ last solo album on the Belgian Integrity label. Bates and Becker went directly from this to collaborate with Anne Clark on her album The Law Is an Anagram of Wealth and later also on To Love & Be Loved. In 1991 Bates formed Hungry I with former Primitives bassist/guitarist Steve Dullahan.

=== 1993–2014: Full reformation and continued work ===
During the early 1990s, Becker had begun work on a solo album, working with Elizabeth S. as a vocalist on what the latter described as "stuff with a country feel" and to which Bates contributed some vocal melodies. Gradually Bates was drawn deeper into the project, which eventually resulted in the resurrection of Eyeless in Gaza, this time as a trio. Recording with producer Paul Samson, the band produced their 1993 comeback album Fabulous Library, which followed a more synth pop and ambient direction than previous recordings.

With the reunion now firmly established, Eyeless in Gaza returned to their original duo setup for studio recordings (although Elizabeth S. would continue with the band as an occasional associate member) and revived their Ambivalent Scale label for new releases. The next album, 1994's Saw You in Reminding Pictures consisted of predominantly improvised pieces, most of them instrumental. In comparison to the heavily synthesized art pop of Fabulous Library, Saw You in Reminding Pictures (described by the band as ""imaginary soundtracks, soundscapes for the reminding pictures in us") featured a more acoustic and experimental instrumentation including toy piano, pixiephone, pump organ and banjo. A companion EP, Streets I Ran, appeared in 1995. The same year saw the release of another full album, Bitter Apples, which blended Eyeless in Gaza's current working methods with elements of their original post-punk recordings. In 1996, the band released a further album, All Under the Leaves, the Leaves of Life.

Meanwhile, Martyn Bates would continue to release solo albums alongside the regular Eyeless albums, also recording three albums of Murder Ballads between 1994 and 1998 with M.J. Harris (Napalm Death/Scorn), and contributing vocals to Derek Jarman's The Last of England and The Garden. There would be a four-year gap between All Under the Leaves, the Leaves of Life and the next Eyeless in Gaza record, 2000's Song of the Beautiful Wanton (released on Soleilmoon, and described as "folk forms, sonic attacks, broken glass... a tapestry of barbed wire & blood flowers.").

From this point onwards, Eyeless in Gaza would spend lengthy periods in the studio incubating new recording, although they would occasionally surface for concerts (accompanied by Elizabeth S.) In 2006, they released Summer Salt the first and eponymous volume of the Summer Salt & Subway Sun sessions, part of a "mammoth set of recordings" dealing with the concept of "The City (as) resolutely an outward manifestation of the human psyche". Summer Salt would be reissued in 2008 as half of the Summer Salt and Subway Sun double album: the second album, Subway Sun, being more pieces from the sessions. A third album from the sessions Wildcat Sun would follow for a box-set issue, and consisted of a single eighteen-minute track. 2010's Answer Song & Dance compilation summarised the past fifteen years of development alongside a number of previously unreleased tracks.

The "inward looking/reflective" Everyone Feels Like a Stranger followed in 2011, further exploring the band's psychedelic folk tendencies. A sister album, Butterfly Attitude followed in 2012: as with its predecessor, it featured contributions from Elizabeth S. on voice and banjo. In contrast, 2014's Mania Sour featured Bates and Becker alone and was considered another look-back to their post-punk roots. In 2012, Martyn Bates and Peter Becker appeared on "Right North" (2CD), of the international collective 48 Cameras.

=== 2016–present: Retrospective releases and further albums ===
In 2016, both the 2CD compilation Picture the Day: A Career Retrospective 1981–2016 and Eyeless in Gaza's eighteenth album Sun Blues were released to positive reviews. The latter album was given four stars out of five in Mojo magazine and another critic, reviewing both releases, wrote: "It takes some time to truly ‘hear’ the layers and complexities of this album, in the same way it takes time to grasp the width, breath and achievement of Eyeless in Gaza's musical history. But time spent will be rewarded: Eyeless in Gaza remain one of the most accomplished and interesting bands to have emerged from the music-making underground."

Having opted to withdraw from their already sparse live appearances, Eyeless in Gaza concentrated on "twilight music" for 2018's Winter Sang. Forty years after their formation, Eyeless in Gaza released their twentieth album Ink Horn/One Star in January 2020.

In 2022 Cherry Red released the 5 cd box set Skeletal Framework - The Cherry Red Recordings 1981-1986, curated by Bates and Becker and thematically divided over five discs of "Rock and Rhythmic", "Pop Tunes etc", "Approximate Ballads and Similar", "Atmos-songs" and "Experiments and Improv".

== Discography ==
=== Albums ===
- Photographs as Memories (1981), Cherry Red - UK Indie no. 19, CD reissue includes 7 bonus tracks from early singles
- Caught in Flux (1981), Cherry Red - UK Indie no. 27, original LP included bonus 5 track 12", The Eyes of Beautiful Losers, also included on CD reissue
- Pale Hands I Loved So Well (1982), Uniton
- Drumming the Beating Heart (1982), Cherry Red/Virgin - UK Indie no. 26, CD issue (1996) also includes Pale Hands I Loved So Well
- Rust Red September (1983), Cherry Red - UK Indie no. 5, CD issue (1994) includes 6 bonus tracks
- Back from the Rains (1986), Cherry Red - CD issue (1989) includes 4 bonus tracks
- Fabulous Library (1993), Orchid
- Saw You in Reminding Pictures (1994), Hive-Arc
- Bitter Apples (1995), Ambivalent Scale
- All Under the Leaves, the Leaves of Life (1996), Ambivalent Scale
- Song of the Beautiful Wanton (2000), Soleilmoon
- Summer Salt & Subway Sun (2006), Ambivalent Scale (first album)
- Summer Salt & Subway Sun (2008), Beta-lactam Ring (both albums)
- Answer Song & Dance (2010), Monopol
- Everyone Feels Like a Stranger (2011), Ambivalent Scale
- Butterfly Attitude (2012), Downwards
- Mania Sour (2014), Ambivalent Scale
- Sun Blues (2016), Ambivalent Scale
- Winter Sang (2018), Ambivalent Scale
- Ink Horn/One Star (2019), Ambivalent Scale

=== Compilations ===
- Kodak Ghosts Run Amok-–Chronological Singles, etc., 1980-86 (1987), Cherry Red
- Transience Blues (1990), Integrity
- Orange Ice & Wax Crayons (1992), Document - previously unreleased material
- Voice; The Best of Eyeless in Gaza (1993), Cherry Red
- Sixth Sense-–The Singles Collection (2002), Cherry Red
- Home Produce—Country Bizarre (2003), NDN - with Lol Coxhill, expanded version of the 1982 release
- No Noise - The Very Best of Eyeless in Gaza (2005), Cherry Red
- Plague of Years (2010), Sub Rosa
- Orange Ice & Wax Crayons (2012), cat|sun MonotypeRec - previously unreleased material (different from 2002 release)
- Original Albums Boxset (2014), Cherry Red – 4-CD boxset, first four albums and one disc of 1980–1983 rarities
- Mythic Language (2015), A-Scale – 3-CD boxset with bonus download album, rarities and unreleased material
- Picture the Day: A Career Retrospective (1981–2016) (2016), Cherry Red
- Skeletal Framework - The Cherry Red Recordings 1981-1986 (2022) 5-CD box set, Cherry Red

=== EPs ===
- Kodak Ghosts Run Amok (1980), Ambivalent Scale
- Invisibility (1981), Cherry Red
- Others (1981), Cherry Red
- Kiss the Rains Goodbye (1986), Cherry Red
- Streets I Ran (1995), Ambivalent Scale - 5 track companion release to "Saw You In Reminding Pictures"

=== Singles ===
- "Veil Like Calm" (1982), Cherry Red - UK Indie no. 42
- "New Risen" (1983), Cherry Red - UK Indie no. 15
- "Sun Bursts In" (1984), Cherry Red - UK Indie no. 13
- "Welcome Now" (1985), Cherry Red
- "Shorepoem" (2009), Monopol

=== Cassettes ===
- Untitled/Home Produce (1982), Tago Mago - split cassette with Lol Coxhill
- Flowmotion (1982) – Various artists, including ″Dusky Ruth″ and ″Through Eastfields″ by Eyeless in Gaza
- Rust Red September / Singles, Rarities and Deletions (1983) Cherry Red – Contains 15 bonus tracks
- Back from the Rains / Drumming the Beating Heart (1986) Cherry Red – Double Play cassette
- Kodak Ghosts Run Amok (Chronological Singles etc. 1980-1986) / Caught In Flux (1987) Cherry Red – Double Play cassette

=== Videos ===
- Street Lamps n' Snow (1994) - 1982 concert in Le Havre
- Saw You in Reminding Pictures (2005), Cherry Red - DVD reissue of above video plus original promo videos for "Veil Like Calm" and "New Risen" and six tracks recorded live on the Isle of Wight, 2004
