= Crystal Machine =

Studio album by Tim Blake
- Released: 1977
- Recorded: 1976–77
- Genre: Electronica; psychedelic rock; progressive rock
- Label: Egg Records
- Producer: Tim Blake

Tim Blake chronology
Crystal Machine (1977)	Blake's New Jerusalem (1978)

Crystal Machine is a combination studio/live album by English keyboardist, synthesist, vocalist, and composer Tim Blake, recorded and released in 1977 on Egg Records, LP (900545).

== Track listing ==
All tracks composed by Tim Blake

1. "Midnight" [7:40]
2. "Metro/Logic" [8:07]
3. "Last Ride of the Boogie Child" [9:43]
4. "Synthese Intemporel" [19:30]
5. "Crystal Presence" [3:11]

== Personnel ==
- Tim Blake - Instruments: EMS Synthis A, Minimoog, Elka Rhapsody, effects [EMS Frequency Shifter, MXR Flanger, Sony TC Tape Deck Echo, Sony Mix 12], production
