= Into the Woods (Hawkwind album) =

Studio album by Hawkwind
- Released: 5 May 2017
- Recorded: 2016–17
- Genre: Space rock
- Length: 63:55
- Label: Cherry Red
- Producer: Brockworld

Hawkwind chronology
The Machine Stops (2016)	Into the Woods (2017)	Road to Utopia (2018)

Professional ratings
Aggregate scores
Source	Rating
Metacritic	75/100
Review scores
Source	Rating

Into the Woods is the thirtieth album by space rock band Hawkwind, released on 5 May 2017. It peaked at number 34 in the UK Albums Chart. In an interview with Phil Alexander for Planet Rock, Brock described the album as "a continuation of the story of The Machine Stops".

== Background ==
The group's line-up had stabilised for some time with guitarist/singer Dave Brock, drummer Richard Chadwick and singer Mr Dibs, bassist Haz Wheaton had made a guest appearance on the previous album The Machine Stops replaces Niall Hone here, while guitarist Magnus Martin (whose band Tarantism had often supported Hawkwind) makes his first recorded appearance with the band.

They promoted the album with a UK tour in March through May 2017, which featured an opening set performed acoustically. The Roundhouse main show from 26 May was issued as Hawkwind At The Roundhouse as a 2CD/DVD boxed-set on 8 December, and the group made a promotional appearance playing an acoustic version of "Ascent" on Matthew Wright's Channel 5 daily morning television programme The Wright Stuff on 1 December.

== Track listing ==
No.	Title	Writer(s)	Length
1.	"Into the Woods"	Dave Brock	6:16
2.	"Cottage in the Woods"	Brock	3:51
3.	"The Woodpecker"	Brock, Richard Chadwick	0:51
4.	"Have You Seen Them?"	Brock, Haz Wheaton, Chadwick, Jon Derbyshire	6:58
5.	"Ascent"	Brock	3:41
6.	"Space Ship Blues"	Brock, Wheaton, Chadwick	6:35
7.	"The Wind"	Brock, Wheaton, Chadwick	4:09
8.	"Vegan Lunch"	Brock	5:18
9.	"Magic Scenes"	Brock, Wheaton, Chadwick	6:11
10.	"Darkland"	Derbyshire	2:13
11.	"Wood Nymph"	Brock, Wheaton, Chadwick	5:57
12.	"Deep Cavern"	Derbyshire	2:26
13.	"Magic Mushrooms"	Brock, Wheaton, Chadwick	9:27

== Personnel ==
Hawkwind

- Mr Dibs – vocals, keyboards, synthesisers
- Haz Wheaton – bass guitar, keyboards
- Richard Chadwick – drums, percussion, vocals
- Dave Brock – vocals, guitar, keyboards, synthesisers, theremin
- Magnus Martin – keyboards, guitar

== Charts ==
Chart (2017)	Peak position
Scottish Albums (OCC)	22
UK Albums (OCC)	34
UK Independent Albums (OCC)	8
UK Rock & Metal Albums (OCC)	2
