= Anne Clark (poet) =

British poet and musician

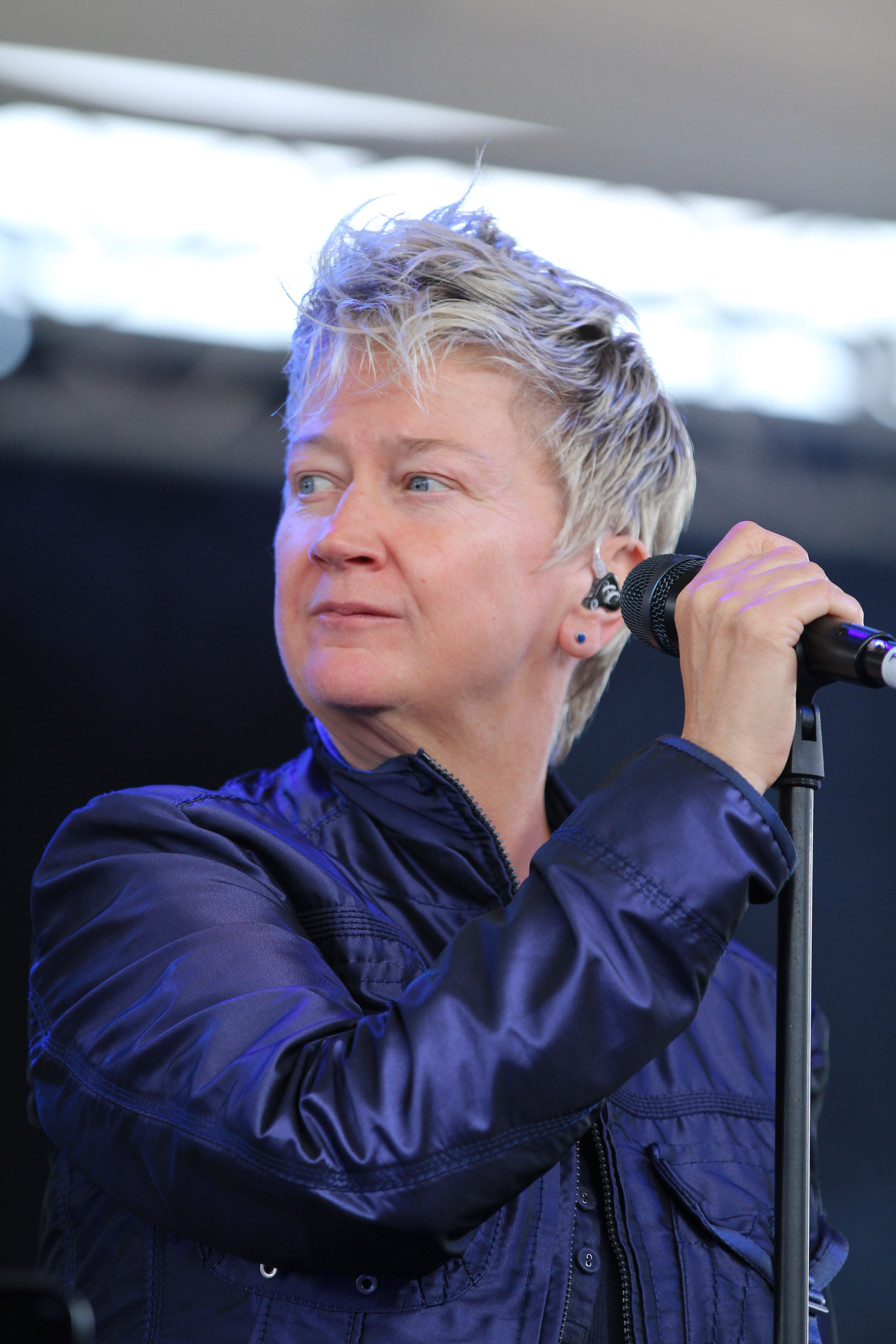
- Clark in 2014

Background information
- Born: Anne Charlotte Clark; 14 May 1960 (age 66)
- Origin: London, England
- Genres: New wave, dark wave, electronic, avant-garde
- Occupations: Poet, singer, songwriter, musician
- Years active: 1982–present
- Labels: Red Flame; SPV GmbH; 10
- Website: anneclarkofficial.com

Anne Charlotte Clark (born 14 May 1960) is an English poet, spoken word artist, singer and songwriter. Her music is often backed by electronic music, but later she began working with an acoustic band. Her first album, The Sitting Room, was released in 1982, and she has released over a dozen albums since then.

== Early life ==
Clark was born the daughter of a Roman Catholic Irish mother, Cecilia, and a Scottish and Welsh Protestant father, Herbert. She has one brother, John and mentions in her spoken biography Notes Taken Traces Left that her mother also had another son who died shortly after being born. Clark recollects her childhood in her spoken biography as being "troubled but loving at the same time". At the age of 16, she left school. She took various jobs, one of which was as a nurse in a psychiatric hospital.

She then worked at a local record store and label, Bonaparte Records in Bromley. Joining the early punk scene, she started booking events at Warehouse Theatre, putting on music, poetry, and comedy. Clark managed to fill the theatre with artists like Paul Weller, Linton Kwesi Johnson, French & Saunders, The Durutti Column, Ben Watt (who later became a member of Everything But The Girl), and many others.

She experimented with music and lyrics herself and first appeared on stage in Richard Strange's Cabaret Futura with Depeche Mode. By the early 80's she was performing poetry backed by a band called A Cruel Memory.

Working with Paul Weller, she helped to set up his Riot Stories publishing imprint, and was part of putting together Hard Lines, an anthology of new authors for Faber & Faber.

== Career ==
After signing a deal with SPV GmbH, she released her first album, The Sitting Room, in 1982. On which she worked with Dominic Appleton of This Mortal Coil.

Clarke then began collaborating with keyboard player David Harrow, who she had known from the Warehouse Theatre. Their first release together was her second album 1983's Changing Places, followed by EP Joined up Writing in 1984.

Joined up Writing contained the song "Our Darkness", that was one of Clark's most notable successes. The song was put on a list of the 20 best industrial and EBM records of all time by Fact magazine in 2014. Fact describe it as "An influential proto-house record". David Harrow's music on "Our Darkness" is sampled in Benny Benassi's 2003 hit "Love is Gonna Save Us".

After being moved to another Virgin subsidiary, 10 Records, Clark released the John Foxx-produced album Pressure Points in 1985. The album features the song Heaven which was considered a moderately successful hit across Europe.

Clark was set to start touring in the United States in the late 1980s, however, was subsequently in disagreements with Richard Branson which led her breakthrough in America to be cancelled. Nevertheless, Clark has become a well respected artist across Europe, especially in Germany where she has a cult following.

In 1987, she released Hopeless Causes, recorded and written with Harrow and classically trained pianist Charlie Morgan. This was followed by live album R.S.V.P in 1988.

Clark had moved to Norway in 1987, where she would live for three years. While there she met Tov Ramstad and Ida Baalsrud, collaborating with them and Charlie Morgan she released the album Unstill Life in 1991 on SPV Records. Tracks included "The Moment", "Unstill Life", "Abuse" and "Empty Me". This album was also released in the USA on Radikal Records. During 1992, she released a non-album collaboration on maxi-CD (SPV) with Ida Baalsrud, who both played the violin part and co-wrote If I Could; furthermore, there was also a remix of Our Darkness included on the last track of the CD.

In December 1992 Charlie Morgan died unexpectedly, which caused many planned collaboration projects to be abandoned.

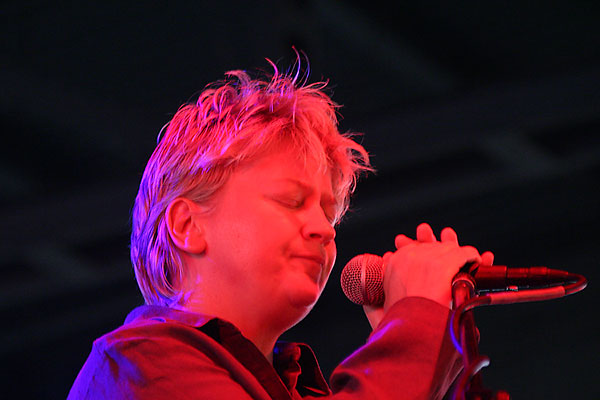
Anne Clark live in concert (M'era Luna Festival) in Hildesheim (Germany) 2004

Clark's next release would be The Law is an Anagram of Wealth in 1993. In 1994, Clark began performing with an acoustic band. This culminated in the release of Psychometry (1994), which featured a concert recorded live on stage in Berlin. Her final album for SPV, To Love and Be Loved was released in 1995. A dance remix album titled The Wordprocessing - The Remix Project, was released in 1997.

Her 1998 album, Just After Sunset - The Poetry of R.M. Rilke, a collaboration with Martyn Bates, featured songs adapted from poems by the German poet Rainer Maria Rilke. This album was re-released four years later in 2002 when Clark regained the rights to the album.

In 2003, another album joined Clark's series of acoustic albums: From The Heart – Live In Bratislava, which she recorded together with Murat Parlak (vocals/piano), Jann Michael Engel (cello), Niko Lai (drums and percussion) and Jeff Aug (guitars) in Bratislava, Slovak Republic.

In 2005, Clark joined up with the Belgian act Implant for the album Self-inflicted, on which she delivered guest vocals. The album was released via Alfa Matrix Records, which in the meantime had become her home label outside of Germany. She also appeared on the Implant EP Too Many Puppies.

2006 saw Clark back again in the recording studio with Implant for the EP Fade Away, on which she delivered guest vocals and performed a duet with Leæther Strip's Claus Larsen. And she also appeared on the album Audioblender by Implant, again released via the Alfa Matrix record label.

In 2008, Clark was in Germany to record her next album The Smallest Act of Kindness, which was released in September 2008. This album was dedicated to her late mother Cecilia Ann Picton-Clark (nee. Murray). At the end of 2010, Clark released the first chapter of an ongoing project Past & Future Tense, the first release on her own label, After Hours Productions.

In January 2011, Clark contributed an arrangement of the Charles Baudelaire poem Enivrez-Vous (Be Drunk) to the audio book and radio play Die künstlichen Paradiese ("The artificial paradises"), (Hörbuch Hamburg/Radio Bremen).

In 2016, Clark announced she would take a year sabbatical, then in January 2017 collaborated on the song Donald Trump Praesidend (Quack Quack) with artist Ludwig.London, intended as a parody in light of the election of Donald Trump.

In July 2017, Clark headlined the W Festival in Belgium alongside acts such as Peter Hook and others.

== Band ==
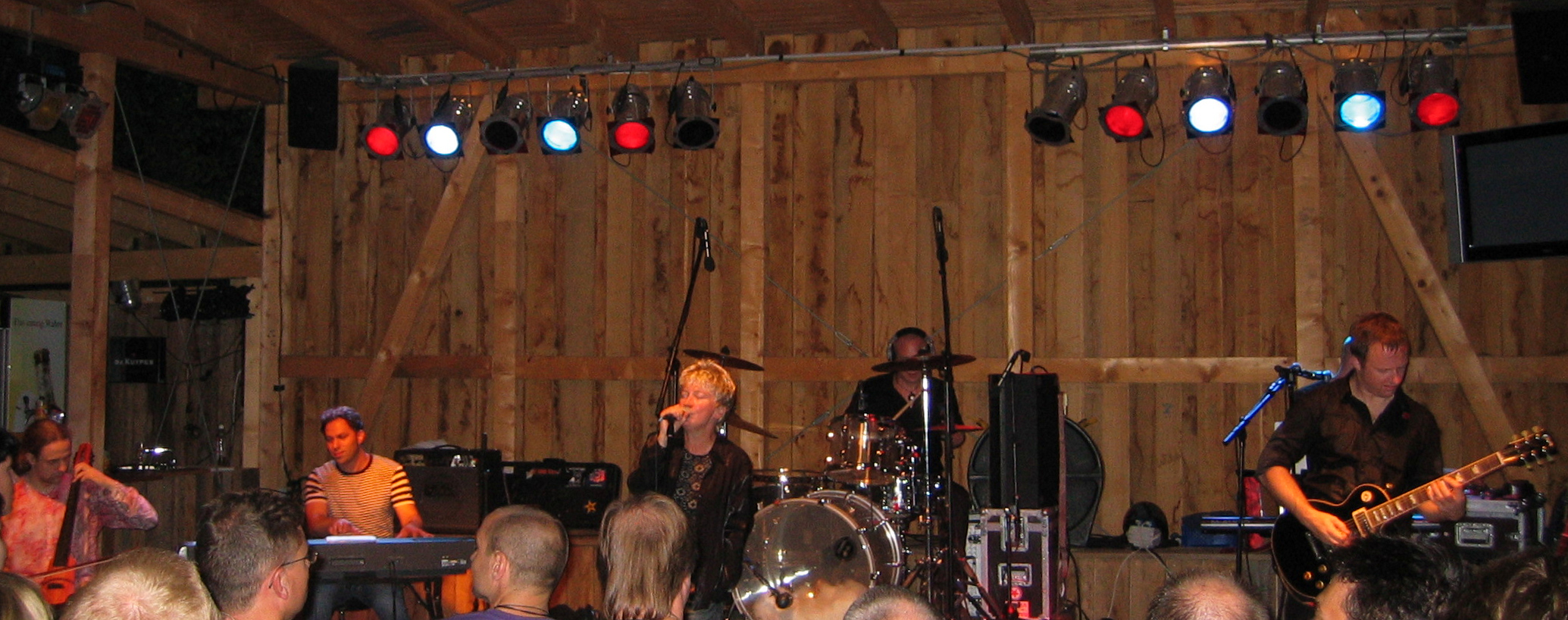
Clark's live band 2008 (from left to right): Jann Michael Engel, Murat Parlak, Anne Clark, Niko Lai, Jeff Aug

Current live band members:

- Anne Clark, Vocals
- Jeff Aug, Guitarist
- Tobias Haas, Drums & Percussion
- Murat Parlak, Piano
- Jann Michael Engel, Cello
- Steve Schroyder, Keyboards & Programming

== Discography ==
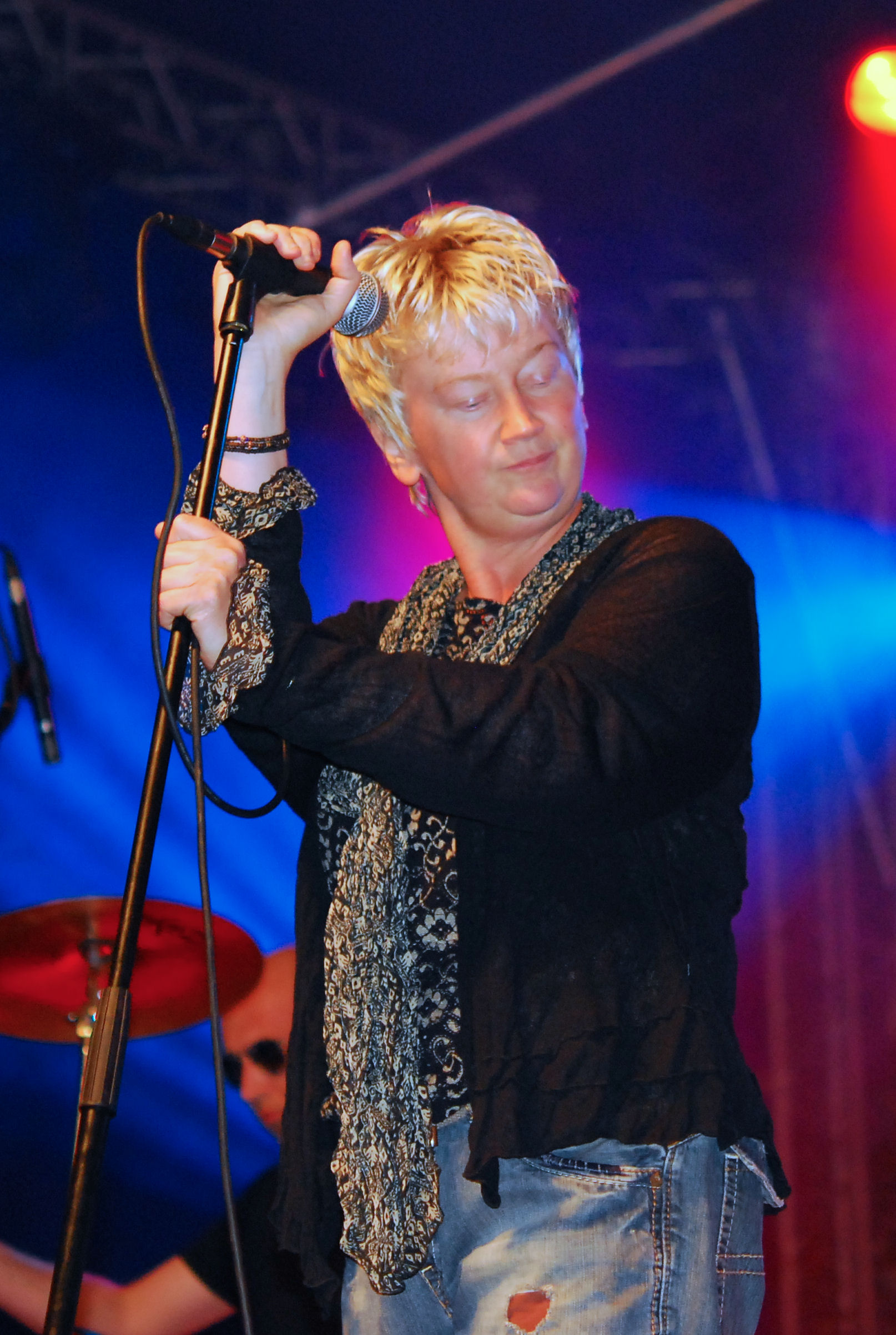
Clark performing in 2008

=== Albums ===
==== Studio albums ====
Title	Album details	Peak chart positions
Title	Album details	GER
The Sitting Room	Released: 1982; Label: Red Flame; Formats: LP	—
Changing Places	Released: 15 July 1983; Label: Red Flame; Formats: LP	—
Joined Up Writing	Released: September 1984; Label: Ink; Formats: LP, MC	—
Pressure Points	Released: September 1985; Label: 10; Formats: CD, LP, MC	35
Hopeless Cases	Released: 2 March 1987; Label: 10; Formats: CD, LP, MC	52
Unstill Life	Released: March 1991; Label: SPV; Formats: CD, LP, MC	—
The Law Is an Anagram of Wealth	Released: April 1993; Label: SPV; Formats: CD, LP, MC	81
To Love and Be Loved	Released: August 1995; Label: SPV; Formats: CD, LP, MC	54
Just After Sunset (The Poetry of Rainer Maria Rilke)	Released: 1998; Label: Labor; Formats: CD; With Martyn Bates	—
The Smallest Acts of Kindness	Released: 26 September 2008; Label: NetMusicZone; Formats: CD	—
Homage the Silence Inside	Released: 19 November 2018; Label: After Hours; Formats: CD, digital download; With Thomas Rückoldt	—
Borderland (Found Music for a Lost World)	Released: 17 August 2022; Label: Stockfisch; Formats: SACD, digital download; With Ulla van Daelen and Justin Ciuche	—
"—" denotes releases that did not chart or were not released in that territory.

==== Live albums ====
Title	Album details
R.S.V.P.	Released: 20 June 1988; Label: 10; Formats: CD, LP, MC
Psychometry: Anne Clark and Friends, Live at the Passionskirche, Berlin	Released: 1994; Label: SPV; Formats: CD
From the Heart – Live in Bratislava	Released: September 2003; Label: NetMusicZone; Formats: CD
Live	Released: 14 August 2009; Label: 36music/Al!ve; Formats: DVD+CD
Enough	Released: 8 November 2012; Label: After Hours; Formats: CD; With Murat Parlak
Live at Rockpalast 1998	Released: 26 May 2023; Label: MIG; Formats: CD+DVD

==== Remix albums ====
Title	Album details	Peak chart positions
Title	Album details	GER
Wordprocessing – The Remix Project	Released: August 1997; Label: Columbia; Formats: CD, 2xLP	51
Synaesthesia	Released: 28 May 2021; Label: After Hours; Formats: 2xCD, 2xLP, digital download	43

==== Compilation albums ====
Title	Album details
Terra Incognita	Released: 1986; Label: Ink; Formats: LP
Trilogy	Released: 1986; Label: Ink; Formats: CD
An Ordinary Life	Released: 1986; Label: Great Expectations; Formats: CD, LP, MC
The Last Emotion	Released: 1991; Label: Beehive; Formats: 3xCD
The Best of Anne Clark	Released: 1992; Label: Beehive; Formats: CD
The Nineties – A Fine Collection	Released: 1996; Label: SPV; Formats: CD
Dream Made Real	Released: 2003; Label: Documents; Formats: CD
The 90's Collection	Released: 2005; Label: NetMusicZone; Formats: 2xCD
The Very Best Of	Released: 12 November 2010; Label: Virgin; Formats: CD

==== Video albums ====
Title	Album details
Iron Takes the Place of Air: Live in Berlin	Released: 1992; Label: SPV Video; Formats: VHS
Balloons – Anne Clark & Band Live	Released: 2014; Label: Synopsis Film; Formats: DVD
I'll Walk Out Into Tomorrow	Released: 14 September 2018; Label: good!movies; Formats: DVD, Blu-ray

=== EPs ===
Title	EP details
Past & Future Tense	Released: 2010; Label: After Hours; Formats: digital download
Fairytales from the Underground	Released: 25 March 2013; Label: After Hours; Formats: CD, digital download; With herrB
Life Wires	Released: April 2014; Label: After Hours; Formats: CD, digital download; With herrB

=== Singles ===
Title	Year	Peak chart positions	Album
Title	Year	GER	Album
"Our Darkness"	1984	24	Joined Up Writing
"Sleeper in Metropolis"	1985	—	Changing Places
"Self Destruct"	1985	—	Joined Up Writing
"Wallies"	1985	—	Changing Places
"Heaven"	1985	—	Pressure Points
"True Love Tales"	1986	—	Joined Up Writing
"Hope Road"	1987	—	Hopeless Cases
"Homecoming"	1987	—	Hopeless Cases
"Abuse"	1990	—	Unstill Life
"Counter Act"	1991	—	Unstill Life
"If I Could"	1992	—	Non-album single
"The Haunted Road"	1993	—	The Law Is an Anagram of Wealth
"Elegy for a Lost Summer"	1994	—	To Love and Be Loved
"Letter of Thanks to a Friend"	1996	—	To Love and Be Loved
"Our Darkness" (1997 remix)	1997	56	Wordprocessing – The Remix Project
"Sleeper in Metropolis" (1997 remix)	1997	—	Wordprocessing – The Remix Project
"Wallies (Night of the Hunter)" (1998 remix)	1998	—	Wordprocessing – The Remix Project
"The Hardest Heart" (as Blank & Jones featuring Anne Clark)	2002	22	Non-album single
"Sleeper in Metropolis 3000"	2003	38	The Mix Volume 2 (Blank & Jones album)
"Donald Trumb Is Praesidend"	2017	—	Non-album singles
"Stop Brexit" (with Thomas Rückoldt)	2019	—	Non-album singles
"Quack Quack" (with Ludwig London)	2020	—	Non-album singles
"Mriya an Ode to Ukraine" (with Justin Ciuche and Jann Michael Engel featuring Jurko Marrow)	2022	—	Non-album singles
"—" denotes releases that did not chart or were not released in that territory.
