= Julian Jay Savarin =

British musician and writer (born 1950)

Julian Jay Savarin (1950-2025) was a British musician, songwriter, poet and science fiction author.

== Biography ==
Born in Dominica, Savarin moved to Great Britain in 1962. He was the organist and main songwriter of Julian's Treatment, which recorded the album A Time Before This (1970). A second album, Waiters on the Dance (1971) is credited to Savarin alone. A third album by Savarin, Beyond the Outer Mirr, was recorded in 1974 but not released until 2025.

All three are science fiction concept albums whose plots resemble those of the Lemmus novels (see below), though with variations. A Time Before This was originally released as a double album, although the individual album sides were sufficiently short to allow the entire work subsequently to be reissued as a single CD. According to the sleeve notes, the songs tell the story of the last surviving man from planet Earth, who journeys across interstellar space to the Alpha Centauri system, where a conflict is raging. On one side stand Alda, Dark Lady of the Outer Worlds, and her ally the Mule (a name which may have been inspired by the chief villain of Isaac Asimov's Foundation Trilogy). On the other is Altarra, Princess of the Blue Women and Supreme Ruler of the planet Alkon. It is implied that the Earthman will become Altarra's ally and lover, and will help her to overthrow Alda and the Mule. Waiters on the Dance and Beyond the Outer Mirr share their titles with the first two novels of the Lemmus trilogy.

As a writer, Julian Savarin is best known for his science fiction trilogy Lemmus: A Time Odyssey, which also serves as the basis for the two concept albums by the musical group of Julian's Treatment. The first work in the series, Waiters on the Dance (1972), tells of the Galactic Organisation and Dominions, which existed long before earth's historic times. There are three primary, sometimes interwoven, threads to the story, played against the backdrop of the mighty but allegedly benevolent G.O.D. One is of the incredibly brilliant and extra sensory perception-adept Alda, a woman of Sirius, who wants to rule the galaxy through behind-the-scenes efforts. The second is about her distant, evil relatives, the Kizeesh male line, eventual rulers of Hulio from the neighbouring Cetus system, who also want to rule the galaxy after breaking with G.O.D. The third thread is played out from a skein about an experiment by G.O.D. to send an amalgam of humans from around the galaxy to the planet Terra under the leadership of Jael Adaamm. The pioneers are screened off from the rest of humanity.

Terra subverts the humans, causing them to inexorably sink into meanness and war. This is caused by a vermoid growth (apparently the appendix) that appears in increasing numbers in infants not born on Atlantis, the heart-land of the human pioneers on Terra. Meanness turns to ugliness and that to murder and war, until all the rest of Terra wages war on Atlantis, eventually destroying it.

Before its destruction, however, the Atlanteans activate a Doomsday device set to trigger thousands of years in the future. A handful of survivors and their descendants attempt to preserve Atlantean knowledge, but all proves futile in the end when the weapon detonates, almost sterilizing the planet. A lone Atlantean survivor, Yesul Chri'istl, has been placed in suspended animation aboard an orbiting ship; when the weapon is detonated his ship sets off into interstellar space. The screen has now been lifted and he arrives safely in G.O.D. controlled space, but the Organisation is appalled to learn of the fate of Terra. While suspended, the Terran has been in telepathic communication with Altarra of Alpha Centauri, a powerful telepath whose abilities prove instrumental in the overthrow of both Alda and the Kizeesh dynasty.

The Organisation then embarks upon a mission to salvage something worthwhile from the failed Terra experiment. Yesul Chri'istl returns to Terra as part of the mission. The ships involved use experimental technology to travel forward in time by increments of hundreds of millions of years. The Organisation scientists on board influence the evolution of life on the planet to create a new human race. They also build a city and stock it with Organisation records and technology to guide the inhabitants' development once they are advanced enough to make use of it. The city is then buried beneath a glacier. When civilisation has reached a suitable level of development, Yesul Chri'istl is telepathically linked to a child who will grow up to become the Messiah of a new religion. However, the planet's evil influence continues; the Messiah is martyred, as are many of his followers, and the message of his religion is subverted for war and conquest.

Two thousand years later the planet is called Earth by its inhabitants. The Organisation's city still has not been discovered, and civilisation is rapidly spiralling into chaos and violence. Two expeditions to Mars fail without being able to tell Earth that they had found Atlantean ruins there; the only man who is convinced the city really exists ends his days in a mental institution. Finally the planet is destroyed a second time in a nuclear war. The last survivor sees two Organisation observers wearing protective suits. Believing them to be the Messiah and his mother she curses them for failing to save humanity and then dies. Shortly afterward the Organisation causes the planet's sun to go nova, obliterating it.

Savarin also wrote a series of action thrillers featuring the exploits of Gordon Gallagher and David Pross, who had been pilot and navigator, respectively, of a Phantom in the British Royal Air Force. Gordon subsequently became a secret agent, and Pross an accomplished pilot of helicopter gunships. Gallagher is an excellent lead character in the mould of James Bond, whereas Pross is more grounded with a family life and business interests. Pross has an unusual relationship with a young agent that is almost brother/sister, and has a dual persona in the books – as an individual he is mild mannered and fairly timid. When piloting a gunship Pross becomes an amazing and ruthless pilot.

== Bibliography ==
=== Lemmus: A Time Odyssey ===
1. Waiters on the Dance, London, Arlington Books, 1972. x, 221 pp. ISBN 0-85140-199-6
  - Reprint: New York: St. Martin's Press, 1978. 252 pp. ISBN 0-312-85416-1
2. Beyond the Outer Mirr, New York: St. Martin's Press, 1980. 252 pp. ISBN 0-312-07781-5
3. The Archives of Haven, London: Corgi Books, 1977.
  - Reprint: New York: St. Martin's Press, 1980. 205 pp. ISBN 0-312-04816-5

=== Gordon Gallagher ===
- Wolfrun (also published as Wolf Run), London: Allison & Busby, 1984. 288 pp.ISBN 0-85031-547-6
- Water Hole, London: Allison & Busby, 1982. 267 pp. ISBN 0-85031-458-5
  - Reprint: New York: St. Martin's Press, 1982. 267 pp. ISBN 0-312-85768-3
- Naja, London: Allison & Busby, 1987. ISBN 0-85031-663-4
  - Reprint: New York: St. Martin's Press, 1990, c1986. 252 pp. ISBN 0-312-03969-7
- The Queensland File, New York: HarperPaperbacks, 1994. 420 pp. ISBN 0-06-100683-1
  - Reprint: New York: Walker and Co., 1991. 285 pp. ISBN 0-8027-1148-0
  - Reprint: New York: HarperPaperbacks, 1992. 448 pp. ISBN 0-06-100474-X
- Villiger, New York: St. Martin's Press, 1991. 315 pp. ISBN 0-312-05532-3
- Windshear, New York: HarperCollins Publishers, 1992. 340 pp. ISBN 0-06-100432-4

=== David Pross (Helicopter Gunship Pilot) ===
- Lynx, New York: Walker, 1986, c1984. 235 pp. ISBN 0-8027-0890-0
- Wind Shear (1985)
- Gunship, New York: St. Martin's Press, 1988, c1985. 296 pp. ISBN 0-312-01439-2
- Hammerhead, London: Secker & Warburg, 1987. 278 pp. ISBN 0-436-44159-4
  - Reprint: New York: St. Martin's Press, c1987. 278 pp. ISBN 0-312-01770-7
  - Reprint: New York: Kensington, 1990, 350 pp. ISBN 0-8217-2899-7
  - Reprint: Ulverscroft, 1990. 587 pp. (large print). ISBN 0-7089-2228-7

=== MacAllister ===
1. MacAllister's Run (1995)
2. MacAllister's Task (1997)

=== Muller and Pappenheim ===
1. A Cold Rain in Berlin (2002)
2. Romeo Summer (2003)
3. Winter and the General (2003)
4. A Hot Day in May (2004)
5. Hunters Rain (2004)
6. Summer of the Eagle (2005)
7. Seasons of Change (2005)
8. The Other Side of Eden (2006)
9. Sunset and the Major (2006)

=== Stand-alone novels ===
- Arena (1979)
- Red Gunship, New York: Kensington Publishing, 1989. 334 pp. ISBN 0-8217-2733-8
- Trophy, New York: HarperCollins, 1990. 470 pp. ISBN 0-06-100104-X
- Target Down!, New York: HarperPaperbacks, 1991. 357 pp. ISBN 0-06-100169-4
- Pale Flyer, New York: HarperPaperbacks, 1994. 344 pp. ISBN 0-06-100676-9
- Horsemen in the Shadows, New York: Severn House Publishers Ltd, 1996. 336 pp. ISBN 978-0727853226
- Starfire, New York: Severn House Publishers Ltd, 2000. 288 pp. ISBN 978-0727855824

== Sources ==
- The Tapestry of Delights – The Comprehensive Guide to British Music of the Beat, R&B, Psychedelic and Progressive Eras 1963–1976, Vernon Joynson, ISBN 1-899855-04-1 Excerpted online
