= Pale Hands I Loved So Well =

Studio album by Eyeless in Gaza
- Released: 1982
- Genre: Experimental
- Label: Uniton
- Producer: John Rivers, Eyeless in Gaza

Eyeless in Gaza chronology
Caught in Flux (1981)	Pale Hands I Loved So Well (1982)	Drumming the Beating Heart (1982)

Pale Hands I Loved So Well is the third album by English band Eyeless in Gaza, released in 1982 by record label Uniton.

== Reception ==
Professional ratings
Review scores
Source	Rating
AllMusic	4/5 stars
Sounds	generally favourable
Trouser Press	unfavourable

AllMusic called it "arguably the highlight of the band's earliest days" and "a delicate, focused, and impassioned collection that sounds like little else released in the English-speaking world in 1981." An unfavourable review came from Trouser Press, which described it as "fairly dissolute – a meandering, largely improvisational attempt to make music out of aimless doodles".

== Track listing ==
All tracks composed by Martyn Bates and Peter Becker

1. "Tall and White Nettles"
2. "Warm Breath, Soft and Slow"
3. "Blue Distance"
4. "Sheer Cliffs"
5. "Falling Leaf/Fading Flower, Goodbye to Summer"
6. "Lies of Love"
7. "To Ellen"
8. "Pale Saints"
9. "Letters to She"
10. "Light Sliding"
11. "Big Clipper Ship"
