= Blood of the Earth =

Studio album by Hawkwind
- Released: 21 June 2010
- Recorded: 2009–10
- Genre: Space rock
- Length: 52:34
- Label: Eastworld
- Producer: Hawkwind

Hawkwind chronology
Knights of Space (2008)	Blood of the Earth (2010)	Onward (2012)

Blood of the Earth is the 26th studio album by the British space rock group Hawkwind, released on 21 June 2010.

Although it is a new studio album, there are some new versions of older songs. "You’d Better Believe It" was originally released on their 1974 album Hall of the Mountain Grill, and "Sweet Obsession" was originally released on Dave Brock's 1984 solo album Earthed to the Ground.

There is a limited 2CD edition, containing live tracks and an interview. "Tide of the Century" was originally recorded by Tim Blake on his 2000 solo album The Tide of the Century. The cover version of "Long Gone" was recorded for Mojo's Syd Barrett special edition of The Madcap Laughs.

== Track listing ==
=== Disc 1 ===
No.	Title	Writer(s)	Length
1.	"Seahawks"	Dave Brock	6:14
2.	"Blood of the Earth"	Brock, Matthew Wright	2:59
3.	"Wraith"	Darbyshire, Hone, Chadwick	6:07
4.	"Green Machine"	Hone	4:04
5.	"Inner Visions"	Tim Blake	4:29
6.	"Sweet Obsession"	Brock	4:45
7.	"Comfy Chair"	Brock	4:54
8.	"Prometheus"	Darbyshire, Hone, Chadwick	5:48
9.	"You’d Better Believe It"	Brock	7:11
10.	"Sentinel"	Darbyshire, Hone, Blake.	6:03

Bonus tracks
No.	Title	Writer(s)	Length
11.	"Starshine" (on single CD and vinyl editions)	Brock, Jason Stuart	7:11
12.	"Sunship" (on vinyl editions)	Darbyshire, Hone	2:54

=== Disc 2 – (Live) ===
1. "Space" (Brock)
2. "Angels of Death" (Brock)
3. "Wraith" (Darbyshire, Hone, Blake, Chadwick)
4. "Tide of the Century" (Blake)
5. "Magnu" (Brock)
6. "Levitation" (Brock)
7. "Long Gone" (Syd Barrett)
8. Interview 2010

== Personnel ==
Hawkwind

- Dave Brock – guitar, keyboards, vocals
- Niall Hone – guitar, bass guitar, keyboards, sampling
- Mr. Dibs – bass guitar, vocals
- Tim Blake – keyboards
- Richard Chadwick – drums, vocals
- Matthew Wright – vocals on "Blood of the Earth"
- Jason Stuart – keyboards on "Starshine"
- Jon Sevink – violin on Live CD

== Charts ==
Chart (2010)	Peak position
UK Independent Albums (Official Charts)	22

== Release history ==
- 21 June 2010: Eastworld Recordings, EWO042CD, UK, CD
- 21 June 2010: Eastworld Recordings, EWO043CDLTD, UK, 2xCD
- 21 June 2010: Eastworld Recordings, RCV030LP, UK, vinyl
