= Road to Utopia (album) =

Studio album by Hawkwind
- Released: 2018
- Genre: Space rock
- Label: Cherry Red
- Producer: Dave Brock; Mike Batt

Hawkwind chronology
Into the Woods (2017)	Road to Utopia (2018)	All Aboard the Skylark (2020)

Professional ratings
Review scores
Source	Rating
Classic Rock	2.5/5 stars
Mojo	3/5 stars
Uncut	3/5 stars
The Wire	3/5 stars

Road to Utopia is the thirty-first album by space rock band Hawkwind, released in 2018. It features new acoustic versions of the band's 1970s repertoire with two new compositions.

The group's line-up had stabilised for some time with guitarist/singer Dave Brock, drummer Richard Chadwick, singer Mr Dibs and bassist Niall Hone being joined by bassist Haz Wheaton and guitarist Magnus Martin .

They had toured Britain in March through May 2017 in support of their Into the Woods album, which featured an opening set performed acoustically. The Roundhouse main show from 26 May was issued as Hawkwind At The Roundhouse as a 2CD/DVD boxed-set on 8 December, and the group made a promotional appearance playing an acoustic version of "Ascent" on Matthew Wright's Channel 5 daily morning television programme The Wright Stuff on 1 December.

The band started work recording this acoustic set in the studio when Brock had a chance meeting with Mike Batt at the US Embassy while both were applying for a travel visa. Batt joined the project adding string and horn arrangements. Eric Clapton, who had been a teenage friend of Brock's prior to his rise to fame, contributed to the session along with their former sax player, Jez Huggett. Road to Utopia was released on 14 September 2018.

A one-off concert at the London Palladium on 4 November billed as In Search of Utopia – Infinity and Beyond with Batt conducting Docklands Sinfonia was scheduled, but demand lead to an extended UK tour in October and November with a guest appearance from Arthur Brown and support from The Blackheart Orchestra.

== Track listing ==
No.	Title	Writer(s)	Length
1.	"Quark Strangeness & Charm"	Dave Brock; Robert Calvert	4:32
2.	"The Watcher"	Ian Kilmister	5:05
3.	"We Took the Wrong Step Years Ago"	Brock	4:56
4.	"Flying Doctor"	Brock; Calvert	5:51
5.	"Psychic Power"	Brock; Calvert	5:19
6.	"Hymn to the Sun"	Magnus Martin	2:51
7.	"The Age of the Micro Man"	Brock; Calvert	5:31
8.	"Intro the Night"	Martin	2:11
9.	"Down Through the Night"	Brock	7:11

== Personnel ==
Hawkwind

- Dave Brock – vocals, guitar, keyboards, synthesiser, harmonica
- Magnus Martin – vocals, guitar, keyboards, viola
- Niall Hone – bass guitar
- Richard Chadwick – drums, percussion, vocals
- Haz Wheaton – bass guitar
- Mr Dibs (Jonathan Darbyshire) – vocals

Additional musicians

- Mike Batt – piano on "The Watcher", orchestral arrangements
- Eric Clapton – guitar on "The Watcher"
- Jez Huggett – saxophone on "The Age of the Micro Man"

== Charts ==
Chart (2018)	Peak position
Scottish Albums (OCC)	24
UK Albums (OCC)	44
UK Independent Albums (OCC)	9
UK Rock & Metal Albums (OCC)	2
