= Woodbine Street Recording Studios =

Recording studio in Leamington Spa, England

Coordinates: 52.284047°N 1.523641°W

Woodbine Street Recording Studios is a recording studio located in the town of Leamington Spa, England. There are two recording rooms, the first being the main 31 square metre one. The second is a 13.6 square metre 'live' room which is wood panelled, optimising it for the recording of drums. The studio also offers a CD mastering service and on-site accommodation is available with kitchen, shower room, TV rest area and sleeping quarters for five people. Since it opened the studio has moved from its original location to St Mary's Crescent, in south Leamington.

Artists that have used the studio facilities include:

- Balaam and the Angel
- Blow Up
- The Bomb Party
- Buzzcocks
- The Chameleons
- Clan of Xymox
- Close Lobsters
- B. J. Cole
- Daniel Ash
- The Darkside
- David J
- Dead Can Dance
- Dr. Phibes and the House of Wax Equations
- Dr. Robert
- The Dylans
- Eyeless in Gaza
- Felt
- The Jazz Butcher Conspiracy
- King Adora
- L'Âme Immortelle
- The Loft
- Love & Rockets
- Manifesto
- Max Eider
- Mighty Mighty
- Ocean Colour Scene
- Persephone
- Piano Magic
- The Specials
- Nikki Sudden
- Mick Taylor
- Paul Weller
- The Shapes
- Sopor Æternus & the Ensemble of Shadows
- Urusei Yatsura
- Whispers in the Shadow
