= Cherry Red Records =

British independent record label

Cherry Red
- Founded: 1978
- Founder: Iain McNay; Richard Jones
- Distributors: Proper Music Distribution; EMI (until 2012); Alternative Distribution Alliance (2024–present)
- Genre: Punk rock; alternative rock
- Country of origin: United Kingdom
- Location: London, England
- Official website: cherryred.co.uk

Cherry Red Records is a British independent record label founded in Malvern, Worcestershire, by Iain McNay in 1978. The label has released recordings by Dead Kennedys, Everything but the Girl, The Monochrome Set, and Felt, among others, as well as the compilation album Pillows & Prayers. In addition to releasing new music, Cherry Red also acts as an umbrella for individual imprints and catalogue specialists.

== History ==
Cherry Red grew from the rock promotion company (similarly named after the song "Cherry Red" by The Groundhogs) founded in 1971 to promote rock concerts at the Malvern Winter Gardens. In the wake of the independent record boom that followed the advent of punk rock, founders Iain McNay (who remains company chairman) and Richard Jones released the label's first single, "Bad Hearts" by punk band The Tights in June 1978.

Cherry Red's early roster included releases by Morgan Fisher under various pseudonyms, using a small studio installed in his Notting Hill flat, as well as material licensed from The Hollywood Brats, Destroy All Monsters and The Runaways. The latter was the label's biggest seller until McNay invested $10,000 in the recording of the debut studio album by San Franciscan political punk band Dead Kennedys. Fresh Fruit for Rotting Vegetables (1979) and its attendant singles sold well worldwide. New A&R head Mike Alway had promoted the Snoopies venue in Richmond, London and been involved with the Scissor Fits, and signed groups including The Monochrome Set, Everything But The Girl, Eyeless in Gaza, Felt, and Five Or Six. McNay aspired for Cherry Red to be a label that offered a space for artists who would otherwise not fit the image of some of the more succinctly defined and stylised independents. "Cherry Red Records was always about musical individuality, diversity, character, commitment and passion," he stated in 2008. It also marketed other smaller independent record labels, like Bristol's Heartbeat Records, which recorded the Glaxo Babies.

Cherry Red's role as one of the keynote labels of the early 1980s independent scene was confirmed by the success of a budget compilation album compiled by Alway and released at Christmas 1982. Retailing for 99p, Pillows & Prayers topped the independent charts for several weeks. The label also released several albums from Adrian Sherwood and his ON-U Sound Label in the early 1980s.

Cherry Red continued to sign contemporary artists but increasingly moved into the reissue market from the late 1980s onwards. It has a number of subsidiary labels dealing in genre-specific releases, curating many "critically unloved" musical genres, in partial continuation of McNay's earlier advocacy of the unfashionable. The label began to acquire the rights to many independent labels from the 1970s and 1980s, including No Future, Flicknife, Rondelet, Midnight, Temple and In Tape - this spawned the "Collector" series of releases, which saw punk, psychobilly, goth and metal genres covered. Another "Collector" series that proved popular was the label's football releases, which released over 60 CDs of collections of club and country football songs.

The company has also signed agreements with a number of specialist reissue labels, which operate with a degree of autonomy using Cherry Red's logistical and financial support. Mark Stratford's RPM Records label focuses on pop music from the 1960s to the advent of punk. Esoteric Recordings, headed by Mark Powell, specialises in progressive rock and folk catalogue. Mark Brennan heads 7T's Records, which reissues albums by that decade's glam/glitter generation. (Brennan originally helped Cherry Red form one of its first subsidiary labels, Anagram, covering punk, Psychobilly and Goth, which remains active). él Records continues under the auspices of Mike Alway (but purely as a re-release label), alongside other labels including Poker, Giant Steps, Mortarhate, Now Sounds, and Ork. The Cherry Red label group continues to house reissues, but is also active in the release of new studio material by established artists such as Suzi Quatro, Marc Almond, Red Box, Van Der Graaf Generator, Jah Wobble & Keith Levene, Squackett (a collaboration between Steve Hackett and Chris Squire), Hussey-Regan (a collaboration between Wayne Hussey and Julianne Regan), Hazel O'Connor, The Christians and Ken Hensley.

Still headed by McNay, a fan of AFC Wimbledon, alongside managing director Adam Velasco, Cherry Red also has interests in football-related releases, with the most complete catalogue of soccer-related songs extant.

In 2007, the company launched a streaming television service, cherry red TV. It also publishes an in-house magazine and an 'in-house' publishing division, 'Cherry Red Songs'. Cherry Red's previous music publisher, Complete Music, was acquired by BMG Music Publishing in 2006.

In early 2015, Cherry Red Records and PWL reissued the first four Kylie Minogue albums, Kylie, Enjoy Yourself, Rhythm Of Love and Let's Get To It, as deluxe CD/DVD and LP boxsets.

Cherry Red also released a plethora of prestigious frontline albums by established artists that year, including Marc Almond's The Velvet Trail, The Zombies' Still Got That Hunger, Sarah Cracknell's Red Kite, Andy Bell of Erasure's Torsten The Bareback Saint, Jimmy Somerville's Homage, The Fall's Sub-Lingual Tablet and Wolfgang Flür's Eloquence.

In 2016, Cherry Red had its highest chart position, with the new studio album from Hawkwind, The Machine Stops, reaching No. 29 in the UK Albums Chart in April 2016. It also announced the release of the latest studio album from Van Der Graaf Generator in September.

In 2017, Cherry Red confirmed it will be representing several label catalogues and artist discographies, including Procol Harum, The Residents, Arthur Brown, Captain Oi, Glenn Hughes and Tim Blake. It also acquired 13 artist catalogues from Warner Music Group as part of the major's divestments to independent labels, including Howard Jones, Kim Wilde, Marc Almond, Third Ear Band, Dinosaur Jr., Mel & Kim, Fourplay (shared with Evolution Media Group), Renaissance (except their debut album, which remained with Elektra Records), Be-Bop Deluxe and Curved Air. These catalogues will be distributed worldwide through Absolute Label Services.

The 2017 BPI yearbook All About The Music included Cherry Red in the 20 Market Share By Corporate Group at number 15, which explained the chart-eligible album sales of all record labels.

In 2018, Cherry Red acquired the extensive catalogue of Witchwood Media, home to the music of the Strawbs and a roster of other related artists.

In late 2019 and early 2020, Cherry Red acquired more label and album catalogue, including Safari Records (Toyah, Jayne County), Emerald Music, Genesis' debut album, From Genesis to Revelation, and Chapter One Records. Cherry Red have also acquired the catalogue from numerous independent labels including Inevitable Records (Dead Or Alive), Attrix Records (Peter & The Test Tube Babies) and Native Records (Screaming Trees). Artist catalogues acquired in 2020 included Glenn Hughes and Trapeze, rock band The Stairs and Edgar Jones, psychedelic rock band July, heavy metal band Sir Lord Baltimore, psychedelic rock band Outskirts Of Infinity, NWOBHM band Spider, guitarist Paul Brett, record producer and musician Tom Newman and Canadian pub rocker Philip Rambow. In late 2020 Cherry Red acquired producer Joe Meek's "Tea Chest Tapes" collection - a host of quarter-inch tapes kept in 67 tea chests.

2021 saw the label acquire the Dissonance Productions label and catalogue from Plastic Head Distribution. The extreme metal label has a catalogue of approximately 130 releases including At The Gates’ Gardens Of Grief, Holy Terror’s Terror & Submission, Nifelheim’s Servants Of Darkness and Ascension Of The Watchers’ Apocrypha. In 2021 and 2022 it released new albums by Agent Steel, Lawnmower Deth and Tokyo Blade. Notable catalogue acquisitions for the label in 2021 included deals for the catalogue of independent labels such as Golf, Abstract, Planet Dog and Peer Music. Artist catalogue the label now wholly or partially represent include Edward Ball (of The Times), Jah Wobble, Ron Geesin, Suzi Quatro, Miki Dallon and Dead Or Alive’s early recordings.

In 2023 Cherry Red acquired Peter Hammill's Fie! catalogue from the Van Der Graaf Generator frontman. The Fie! imprint was an output for Hammill's solo material and Cherry Red began a reissue campaign through the Esoteric Recordings imprint, as well as releasing Hammill's 2026 studio album Tears In Time on the Esoteric Antenna imprint. In late 2023, Cherry Red announced a partnership with MVD Entertainment to represent the physical rights to Jay Records; a record label specialising in theatrical recordings of classical and musical theatre. In 2024 Cherry Red began to represent the catalogue of Christian rap artist Manafest.

Cherry Red released Kim Wilde's studio album Closer on 31 January 2025. A sequel to Wilde's 1988 album Close, Closer reached No. 27 in the UK Albums Chart.

In May 2025 Cherry Red acquired the UK contemporary soul label Dome Records, which represents music from artists such as a Lulu, Beverley Knight, Incognito, Hil St Soul, the James Taylor Quartet, Shaun Escoffery and US artists including Brenda Russell, George Duke, Anthony David, Jarrod Lawson and Andrew Gold.

In December 2025, it was announced that Cherry Red had acquired the catalogues of Gull Records, State Records and Uproar Entertainment. The acquisitions transferred ownership of the master recordings and associated publishing rights for a range of pop, rock, soul, disco and comedy releases.

== Notable awards and prizes ==
In June 2008 the Pillows & Prayers box set won the 'Best Catalogue Release category at that year's Mojo Honours.

At the 2013 Association of Independent Music Awards, Cherry Red won the Special Catalogue Release award for Scared To Get Happy - a box set that explored indie pop from 1980 to 1989.

In 2014, Cherry Red artist Dave Brock of Hawkwind won the Lifetime Achievement Award at the inaugural Prog Progressive Music Awards. They also picked up nominations for Matt Stevens (Breakthrough Artist) and Panic Room (Best Anthem).

The 2015 Progressive Music Awards saw Genesis founder Tony Banks receive the Prog God award after his solo material catalogue reissue campaign with Cherry Red that year. The label also picked up nominations for John Lodge and Tin Spirits in the Best Anthem category, and Bill Nelson and Anthony Phillips in the Storm Thorgerson Grand Design Award category.

Hawkwind's The Machine Stops, received a nomination for Album Of The Year in the Progressive Music Awards 2016.

Cherry Red had two albums in the top 40 of the UK Albums Chart in 2017. Hawkwind's studio album, Into the Woods charted at No. 34 in May and the Fall's final album, New Facts Emerge, charted at No. 35 in July.

On 4 September 2018 at the AIM Independent Music Awards, Cherry Red Records Chairman, Iain McNay, won the Special Recognition Award for his service to independent music for over 40 years, as the label celebrated its 40th anniversary.

Hawkwind's studio album Road To Utopia charted at No. 44 in the UK Albums Chart in September 2018. Hawkwind's next studio album, All Aboard the Skylark, peaked at No. 34 in the UK Albums Chart in July 2019.

Jim Bob, the former frontman of Carter the Unstoppable Sex Machine, charted at No. 26 in the UK Albums Chart in August 2020 with his studio album Pop Up Jim Bob. His 2021 album, Who Do We Hate Today, charted at No. 34 on the UK Albums Chart.

Other UK charting albums for the label in 2021 included Hawkwind's studio album Somnia which entered at No. 57, and Kim Wilde's Pop Don't Stop: Greatest Hits, which peaked at No. 51.

== Cherry Red artists ==
=== Original label artists ===
- Marc Almond
- Attila the Stockbroker
- Beau
- Blind Mr. Jones
- Blow Up
- Bodast
- The Charlottes
- Kevin Coyne
- Dead Kennedys
- Destroy All Monsters
- Everything but the Girl
- Eyeless in Gaza
- The Fall
- Felt
- Morgan Fisher
- Five or Six
- Grab Grab the Haddock
- Kevin Hewick
- In Embrace
- Inspiral Carpets
- Jane
- Jim Bob
- Thomas Leer
- The Long Ryders
- Marine Girls
- Medium Medium
- The Misunderstood
- Momus
- The Monochrome Set
- Mozart Estate
- The Nightingales
- Nektar
- The Passage
- Pere Ubu
- Prolapse
- Suzi Quatro
- The Seers
- The Sting-rays
- Red Box
- The Runaways
- Rascal Flatts
- Tracey Thorn
- Warfare

=== Reissue label artists ===
- Marc Almond
- Altered Images
- The Band of Holy Joy
- Be Bop Deluxe
- Beau
- Betty Boo
- Blue Orchids
- Marc Bolan
- Bow Wow Wow
- Breathe
- Bruce Foxton
- Brotherhood of Man
- Arthur Brown
- Chapterhouse
- Cranes
- Cud
- Curved Air
- The Dancing Did
- Divine
- Duffy Power
- Exposé
- Joe Meek
- Julia Fordham
- Frazier Chorus
- The Freshies
- Genesis
- Phillip Goodhand-Tait
- Paul Haig
- Hawkwind
- John Howard
- Into A Circle
- La Toya Jackson
- John's Children
- Howard Jones
- June Brides
- Laibach
- Annabel Lamb
- The Long Ryders
- Donna Loren
- Marilyn
- Martha and the Muffins
- McCarthy
- Mel & Kim
- Milk 'N' Cookies
- Kylie Minogue
- Mobiles
- Mood Six
- R. Stevie Moore
- Martin Newell
- Bill Nelson
- Hazel O'Connor
- Paw
- Red Lorry Yellow Lorry
- The Residents
- Julian Jay Savarin (as Julian's Treatment)
- Screaming Trees
- The Servants
- Sex Gang Children
- Sheena Easton
- Spizzenergi
- Stavely Makepeace
- Sweet
- Suzi Quatro
- Tears for Fears
- Television Personalities
- Toyah
- Lon & Derrek Van Eaton
- Weekend
- Wigwam
- Kim Wilde
- Pete Wingfield
- The Woodentops
- Yeah Yeah Noh

== Cherry Red associated imprint labels ==
The full repertoire of Cherry Red associated imprint labels as of 2016:

- 30 Hertz
- 359 Music
- 3Loop Music
- 7Ts
- Anagram Records
- Analog Baroque (Momus)
- Artpop
- Atomhenge
- Badfish
- Bella Casa
- Big Break Records
- Cherry Pop
- Cherry Red Football
- Cherry Red Records
- Cherry Tree
- Cocteau Discs
- Croydon Municipal
- el
- Esoteric Antenna
- Esoteric Recordings
- FiveFour
- Giant Steps
- Grapefruit
- HNE Recordings
- Hot Milk
- Hot Shot
- IronBird
- Lemon
- Manticore
- Morello
- Mortarhate
- Now Sounds
- Original Dope
- Phoenix City
- Poker
- Pressure Drop
- Purple Records
- Reactive
- Redline
- Robinsongs
- RPM
- Ryder Music
- SFE
- Sidewinder Sounds
- SoulMusic Records
- SuperBird
- T-Bird Americana
- The Right Honourable Recording Company Ltd
- Tune In
- Visionary
- West Midlands
- WiseCrack Records

== Compilations ==
Notable compilations released by Cherry Red Records include:

- Avon Calling: tracks featuring bands from Bristol
- Close to the Noise Floor: Formative UK Electronica 1975-1984
- Flaming Schoolgirls: previously unreleased tracks by The Runaways
- The Genesis of Slade: tracks by the members of Slade from before the band's formation
- Leapers and Sleepers: Duffy Power
- Milking the Sacred Cow: selection of Dead Kennedys tracks
- Pillows & Prayers: tracks from Cherry Red artists
- Perspectives and Distortions: Tracks from Cherry Red artists Compiled by Mike Alway 1981
- Scared to Get Happy: A Story of Indie-Pop 1980–1989
- Silhouettes and Statues: A Gothic Revolution 1978-1986
- Songs in the Key of Z: outsider music tracks selected by Irwin Chusid
- That's All Very Well But...: singles and rarities by the band McCarthy
- Volume, Contrast, Brilliance...: unreleased tracks and early sessions by The Monochrome Set
- Your Box Set Pet (The Complete Recordings 1980–1984): three-volume compilation of Bow Wow Wow tracks

== Marketing ==
From July 2018 to August 2020, Cherry Red were the main shirt sponsor for the English football league club Wycombe Wanderers. They are also the longstanding stadium sponsor for the League One club AFC Wimbledon, both at their original Kingsmeadow ground from 2003 and at the new Plough Lane since 2021.

== See also ==
- List of independent UK record labels
