= Tim Blake =

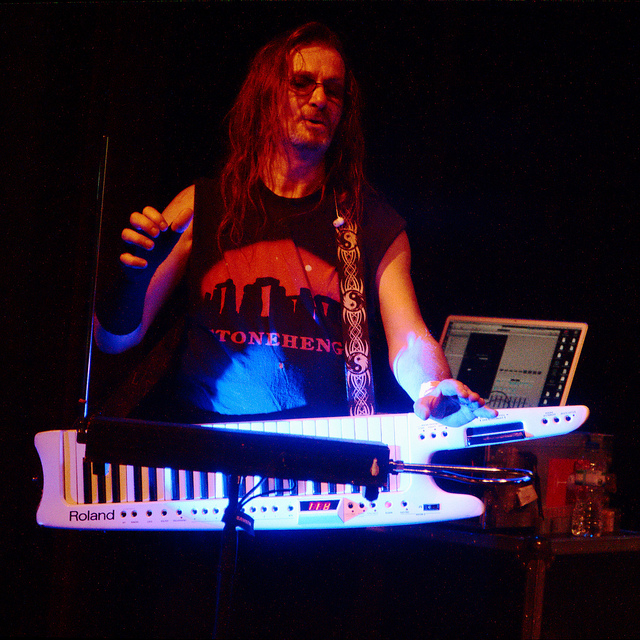
- Tim Blake in 2013

Background information
- Also known as: High T. Moonweed
- Born: 6 February 1952 (age 74); Shepherd's Bush, London, England
- Genres: Progressive rock, psychedelic rock, electronica
- Occupation: Musician
- Instruments: Keyboards, synthesizer, theremin, guitar, harmonica, vocals
- Years active: 1970–present
- Label: Independent
- Website: moonweed.free.fr

Timothy Blake (born 6 February 1952, in Shepherd's Bush, London) is an English keyboardist, synthesist, vocalist, and composer, who is known for working with Gong, Hawkwind and his synthesizer and light performances as Crystal Machine, with the French Light artist Patrice Warrener.

== Career ==
Blake met Daevid Allen at Marquee Studios, where the latter was recording his first solo album Banana Moon in 1971. At the end of the sessions, Allen had invited Blake to be Gong's sound mixer, but Blake preferred to work on his own music. He eventually joined Gong full-time in September 1972 as the band's synthesizer player, being among the first to bring the synthesizer out of the studio and on to the stage. He appears on all three albums of the Radio Gnome Invisible trilogy; Flying Teapot, Angel's Egg, and You, in fact Blake is the only composer, apart from the Allen/Smyth partnership, to have written for all three of the "Trilogy" Albums, making him one of Gong's most important composers. He left Gong in early 1975.

Blake began a solo career under the name of Crystal Machine produced two solo albums 1977's Crystal Machine and 1978's Blake's New Jerusalem, and many stage performances in Europe and Japan, culminating in the 1979 Glastonbury Festival.

Later in 1979, Blake joined up with another noted "space rock" outfit, Hawkwind, the group he had helped to form 10 years before, for a short stint between 1979 and 1980 and has sporadically rejoined them on several occasions. Since November 2007, Blake has been collaborating with Hawkwind full-time, performing on theremin and what he chooses to call "virtual lead guitar".

He has reunited with the 'classic-era' line-up of Gong (minus Pierre Moerlen, who died in May 2005) for one-off concerts, in May 1977, 1995, and in November 2006 at the 3rd Gong Family Unconvention (Uncon) at the Melkweg in Amsterdam. Blake continues to work with Patrice Warrener on his Chromolithe Illumination System, and doing concerts with Jean-Philippe Rykiel.

== Recordings ==
Blake's discography contains more than 25 titles, including eight solo albums as Tim Blake – Crystal Machine and he removed all his solo albums from the record market, preferring to make them available for download as MP3s from his own web site.

== Solo discography ==
- 1977: Crystal Machine
- 1978: Blake's New Jerusalem
- 1979: "Waterfalls in Space" (digitally re-released in 2007)
- 1991: Magick
- 2000: The Tide of the Century
- 2002: Caldea Music II
- 2006: Live Waterfalls in Space
- 2012: Noggi 'Tar
- 2018: Lighthouse- an Anthology 1973–2012
