= Open (Steve Hillage album) =

Studio album by Steve Hillage
- Released: 12 October 1979
- Recorded: August 1979
- Studio: Ridge Farm Studio
- Genre: Progressive rock; electronic; psychedelic rock; space rock
- Label: Virgin
- Producer: Steve Hillage; Nick Mason ("Getting Better")

Steve Hillage chronology
Rainbow Dome Musick (1979)	Open (1979)	For To Next (1982)

Open is the sixth studio album by British progressive rock musician Steve Hillage, released by Virgin Records in October 1979.

Confusingly, Hillage had added a young second guitar player to his band called Dave Stewart, but this was not his old Uriel and Khan bandmate and keyboard player of the same name, although the latter does make a guest appearance with a solo on the closing track, "The Fire Inside".

When the album was released on CD in 1990 the four studio tracks from the earlier live album Live Herald were added at the beginning and the running order of the original album was revised. The remastered CD edition from 2007 retains this running order and also adds two further bonus tracks, including an early version of "Don't Dither Do It" from the Fish Rising sessions.

== Track listing ==
=== Original 1979 track listing ===
Side one
No.	Title	Writer(s)	Length
1.	"Day After Day"	Dave Stewart, Miquette Giraudy, Steve Hillage	6:17
2.	"Getting In Tune"	Hillage	3:16
3.	"Open"	Giraudy, Paul Francis, Hillage	5:16
4.	"Definite Activity"	Andy Anderson, Stewart, Giraudy, Francis, Hillage	4:43

Side two
No.	Title	Writer(s)	Length
5.	"Don't Dither Do It"	Hillage	5:04
6.	"The Fire Inside"	Giraudy, Hillage	6:15
7.	"Earthrise"	Oum Kalsoum, Steve Hillage (adapted)	8:34

=== 1990 CD track listing ===
Open - featuring Studio Herald
No.	Title	Writer(s)	Length
1.	"Talking To The Sun"	Giraudy, Hillage	5:59
2.	"1988 Aktivator"	Hillage	2:29
3.	"New Age Synthesis (Unzipping The Zype)"	Anderson, John McKenzie, Giraudy, Hillage	8:52
4.	"Healing Feeling"	Giraudy, Hillage	6:05
5.	"Earthrise"	Oum Kalsoum, Steve Hillage (adapted)	8:34
6.	"Open"	Giraudy, Francis, Hillage	5:17
7.	"Definite Activity"	Anderson, Stewart, Giraudy, Francis, Hillage	4:43
8.	"Getting Better"	Lennon/McCartney	2:59
9.	"Day After Day"	Stewart, Giraudy, Hillage	6:19
10.	"Getting In Tune"	Hillage	3:15
11.	"Don't Dither Do It"	Hillage	5:04
12.	"The Fire Inside"	Giraudy, Hillage	6:14

2007 CD bonus tracks
No.	Title	Writer(s)	Length
13.	"Don't Dither Do It (1974 Power Trio Backing Track)"	Hillage	4:46
14.	"Four Ever Rainbow (Part 3 Alternative Mix)"	Hillage	8:57

== Personnel ==
Adapted from the original release and the 2007 CD edition.

- Steve Hillage - guitar (glissando, lead), synthesizer, vocals
- Miquette Giraudy - synthesizer, vocals (tracks 1–12, 14)
- Dave Stewart - rhythm guitar, backing vocals (tracks: 5–7, 9–12)
- John McKenzie - bass (tracks 1–4, 8)
- Paul Francis - bass (tracks 5–7, 9–12)
- Andy Anderson - drums, percussion (tracks 1–12)
- Jean-Philippe Rykiel - first synthesizer solo (track 12)
- Dave Stewart - second synthesizer solo (track 12), piano (track 13)
- Mike Howlett - bass (track 13)
- Pierre Moerlen - drums (track 13)

Production

- Steve Hillage - production, reissue compiled by
- Nick Mason - production (track 8)
- Mark Powell - reissue compiled by, research, coordinator, liner notes
- Paschal Byrne - remastering
