= For To Next =

For To Next / And Not Or
- Cover art of For To Next

Studio album by Steve Hillage
- Released: March 1983
- Genre: Progressive rock; electronic; psychedelic rock; space rock
- Length: 79:07 (2xLP)
- Label: Virgin
- Producer: Steve Hillage

Steve Hillage chronology
Open (1979)	For To Next / And Not Or (1983)	BBC Radio 1 Live: Steve Hillage Live in Concert (1992)

For To Next is the seventh studio album by British progressive rock musician Steve Hillage, released by Virgin Records in March 1983. It was released simultaneously with the instrumental companion album And Not Or. The two albums have been released as a double album and on a single CD.

For To Next and And Not Or are the last studio albums issued under Hillage's own name. The titles were derived from the BASIC programming language and reflect the pair's move into computer-based music production, this being mainly synthetic except for Hillage's guitar.

== Track listing ==
=== For To Next ===
All tracks written by Steve Hillage and Miquette Giraudy.

Side one
No.	Title	Length
1.	"These Uncharted Lands"	5:36
2.	"Kamikaze Eyes"	4:50
3.	"Alone"	5:19
4.	"Anthems For the Blind"	4:28

Side two
No.	Title	Length
5.	"Bright Future"	5:08
6.	"Frame by Frame"	5:52
7.	"Waiting"	5:23
8.	"Glory"	6:04

=== And Not Or ===
Side one
No.	Title	Writer(s)	Length
1.	"Before The Storm"	Steve Hillage, Miquette Giraudy	7:08
2.	"Red Admiral"	Miquette Giraudy	6:14
3.	"Serotonin"	Steve Hillage, Miquette Giraudy	5:35

Side two
No.	Title	Writer(s)	Length
4.	"And Not Or"	Steve Hillage	6:25
5.	"Knights Templar"	Daevid Allen, Mike Howlett, Steve Hillage	4:35
6.	"Still Golden"	Steve Hillage	5:52

== Personnel ==
Adapted from the 2007 edition.

- Steve Hillage - guitar, synthesizer, voice, drum programming
- Miquette Giraudy - voice, programming, synthesizer

Production

- Steve Hillage - production, reissue compiled by
- Miquette Giraudy - production (For To Next)
- Denis Blackham - mastering
- Mark Powell - reissue producer, compiled by, liner notes, research
- Paschal Byrne - remastering
