= Xitintoday =

Studio album by Nik Turner's Sphynx
- Released: 1978
- Recorded: Rockfield Studios; flute recorded in the sarcophagus in the Kings Chamber of the Great Pyramid of Giza
- Genre: Space rock
- Label: Charisma
- Producer: Stiv Hillage

Nik Turner chronology
Xitintoday (1978)	Sphynx (1993)

Professional ratings
Review scores
Source	Rating
Allmusic	4/5 stars

Xitintoday (pronounced as "Exit into day") is a studio album released by Nik Turner's Sphynx in 1978. It was produced by Steve Hillage (listed as Stiv Hillage).

== History ==
In the winter of 1976–1977, after Nik Turner had been dismissed from Hawkwind, he travelled to Egypt and made some portable recordings playing flute in the King's Chamber of Great Pyramid of Giza. He persuaded Tony Stratton Smith of Charisma Records, who were Hawkwind's record company, to fund his working of these tapes into an album by regaling him with stories of his adventure.

Steve Hillage had joined Gong for their one-off re-union event in Paris on 28 May, then in July travelled to Los Angeles with Miquette Giraudy to work on his funk-tinged Motivation Radio album with Malcolm Cecil at the Record Plant. Hillage took Turner's original tapes with him for some pre-production work at Westlake Audio. In the interim, Turner had performed with Harry Williamson at the 7/7/77 impromptu Glastonbury Festival. (Note: Williamson had been a sometime member of the Devon-based group Ark, who had befriended and supported Hawkwind. Williamson also brought drummer Anderson into the project, the pair along with Harvey Bainbridge having recorded demonstration tapes of Williamson's project Descent into Atlantis.)

A loose group was assembled to work up the recordings at Rockfield Studios: joining Turner, Williamson, Hillage and Giraudy were Gong musicians Mike Howlett (bass) and Tim Blake (synthesiser). There was a plethora of drummers and percussionists including Michael Ashmore, Andy Anderson, Alan Powell (conga), Shelley Morris (conga), Morris Pert (vibes, timpani), Jhalib (tabla) and Baron Sanyata (timbales). Jeremy Gilbert contributed harp and Georges Kazazian added rebab, while Turner adapted lyrics from the Egyptian Book of the Dead.

The album was released in April 1978 attributed to Nik Turner's Sphynx, with a cover and 16-page booklet put together by Barney Bubbles incorporating concrete poetry. It has been re-issued several times, the last in 2007 by Eclectic with a bonus track of the original flute recordings. Dave Thompson described it for AllMusic as a "magical, mysterious, and, most of all, moody album. Songs as such do not exist; rather, lyrics and arrangements follow an atmosphere-licked destiny of their own making, to take the listener deep inside some forgotten pyramid, to witness the spectral rituals being enacted therein."

The group performed live, particularly on the festival circuit with a revolving body of performers that included drummers Steve Broughton and Ermanno Ghisio-Erba, guitarists David O'List and Steffe Sharpstrings (Stephan Lowry), and singer Corrina. (Note: Also known variously as Katalin Barrat and Karina Peggoty) Turner organised a Bohemian Love-In event at the Roundhouse on 17 June to promote its release. (Note: Joining Turner and Williamson for the Bohemiuan Love-In was O'List, Howlett and Broughton. Also on the bill were Tanz Der Youth (fronted by Brian James with Powell and Andy Colqhoun), Michael Moorcock's Deep Fix (with Adrian Shaw), Blood Donor (with Keith Hale), Patrik Fitzgerald, Lightning Raiders, Steve Took's Horns (with future Inner City Unit members Trev Thoms and Erba), John Cooper Clarke, Ron Geesin and Roger Ruskin Spear.) Other appearances included Glastonbury in June and July, Stonehenge Free Festival, Deeply Vale Festivals on 25 July, (Note: A mixing-desk recording was released in 2000 as Live at Deeply Vale. Listed personnel in addition to Turner and Williamson are incomplete, but include Corrina, Erba, Lowry and an unknown "Baggins" (bass). Williamson remembers others as Jerry, Baron [Sanyata] and Sukie.) and Rock Against Racism Festival at Harwich on 5 August. The group appeared at the Gong Christmas Party on 19 December at Camden Town Electric Ballroom.

With Williamson, Turner conceived the protest single "Nuclear Waste" recorded with Hillage, Howlett and Broughton, and lead vocals from Sting. (Note: Sting was the singer of Howlett's Stontium 90 group that had performed at the Gong re-union concert, who made some demonstration recordings before separating to become The Police.) Williamson had become emotionally involved with Gilli Smyth after her separation from Daevid Allen and the pair embarked on a new project as Mother Gong. Their first album Fairy Tales was effectively by the Sphynx group from the Gong Christmas show, or vice versa. (Note: Joining Turner, Williamson, Erba and Corrina were Trevor Darks (bass), Mo Vicarage (keyboards). Additionally on the album Fairy Tales were Didier Malherbe (saxophone), Eduardo Niebla (acoustic guitar), Ronnie Walthen (Uilleann pipes) and Marianne Oberasher (harp)) Turner's band would continue into 1979 evolving into Inner City Unit, appearing as both Sphynx and ICU at the Glastonbury and Stonehenge festivals, Turner's activities were reported in the mainstream media in 1979, principally by Jeremy Sandford who was taking an interest in re-incarnation, some filming done by BBC Television for the programme I Have Seen Yesterday by Hugh Burnett.

== Track listing ==
All tracks composed by Nik Turner, arranged by Sphynx

1. "The Awakening (Life on Venus)" - 4:20
2. "The Pyramid Spell" - 4:18
3. "The Hall of Double Truth" - 6:00
4. "Anubis" - 4:39
5. "Thoth" - 3:40
6. "Horus" - 5:18
7. "Isis and Nephthys" - 5:46
8. "Osiris" - 5:10
9. "God Rock (The Awakening)" - 8:09
10. "Pyramidaflutenik" - 29:51 (bonus track)

== Personnel ==
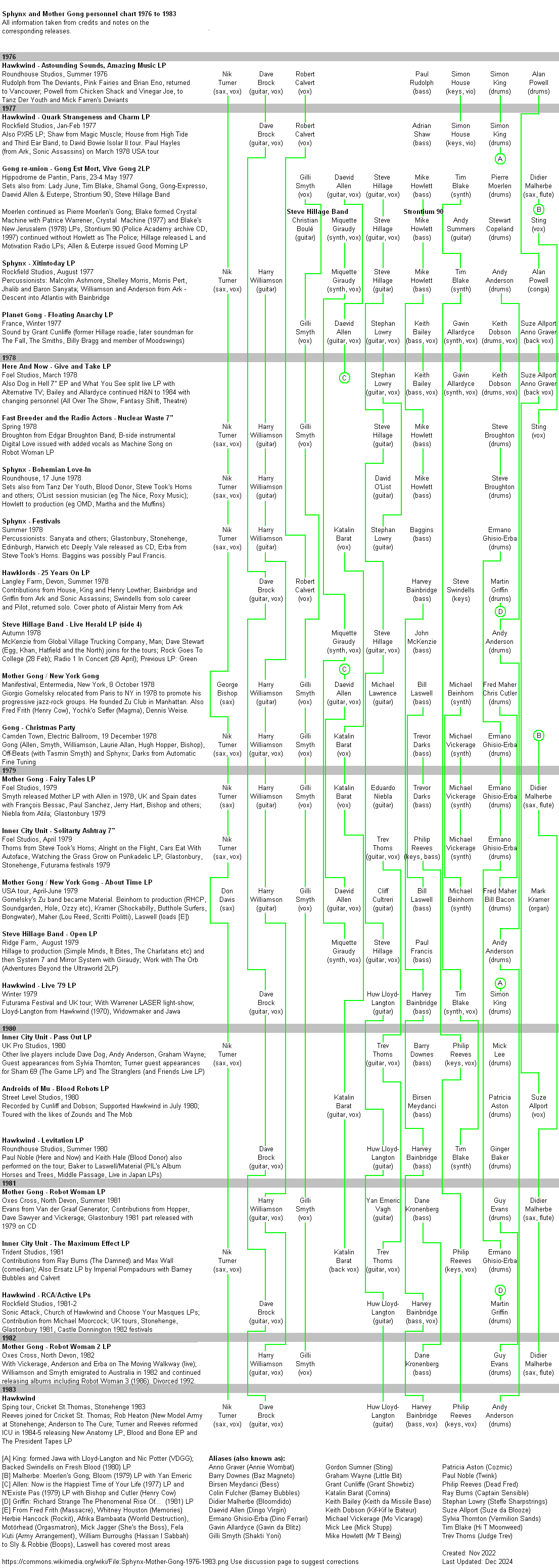
Sphynx and Mother Gong Personnel Chart 1976 to 1983

- Nik Turner - vocals, flute (1,2,4-8), Moog (3), Chinese bells (3,7), saxophone (9)
- Harry Williamson - acoustic guitar (7), piano (1,6), Chinese bells (3,9), zither (5)
- Steve Hillage - electric guitars, synthesiser (3,6), Moog bass (5), bells (7), bass (9)
- Miquette Giraudy - vocals (7,8), synthesiser (1,3-6), Tibetan and Chinese bells
- Mike Howlett - electric bass guitar (2–4,7,8)
- Tim Blake - synthesisers (1,3-7), sequencer (5), Moog bass (9)
- Malcolm Ashmore - drums (3,7,8)

with

- Jeremy Gilbert - harp (7,8)
- Georges Kazazian - rebab (2,7)
- Alan Powell - conga (5,7-9)
- Shelley Morris - conga (9)
- Jhalib - tabla (2,6,9)
- Morris Pert - percussion (2–4), vibes and timpani (8)
- Android Anderson - drums on (9)
- Baron Sanyata - timbales (5,9)

Production

- Steve Hillage - production
- John McAfee - engineering (King's Chamber)
- Lyn Peterzel - engineering (Westlake Audio)
- Dave Charles - engineering (Rockfield)

== See also ==
- Paul Horn (musician), another musician who recorded music inside the Great Pyramid (1976)
