= Green (Steve Hillage album) =

Studio album by Steve Hillage
- Released: 14 April 1978
- Recorded: December 1977–February 1978
- Studio: Ridge Farm Studio, Dorking, Surrey; Matrix Studio, London; Britannia Row Studios, London
- Genre: Progressive rock; electronic; psychedelic rock; space rock
- Length: 46:09
- Label: Virgin
- Producer: Nick Mason; Steve Hillage

Steve Hillage chronology
Motivation Radio (1977)	Green (1978)	Live Herald (1979)

Green is the fourth studio album by British progressive rock musician Steve Hillage, released by Virgin Records in April 1978.

Written in spring 1977 at the same time as his previous album, the funk-inflected Motivation Radio (1977), Green was originally going to be released as The Green Album as a companion to The Red Album (the originally intended name for Motivation Radio). However, this plan was dropped and after a US tour in late 1977, Green was recorded alone, primarily in Dorking, Surrey, and in London.

Produced and engineered by Pink Floyd drummer Nick Mason, Green features science fiction themes and explores electronic music, especially of a dance music bent, continuing the dance themes of Motivation Radio. Most of the guitar and some of the keyboard parts on Green were played by Hillage with a Roland GR 500–an early guitar synthesizer. Hillage enjoyed "the hybrid sounds" he achieved on the album with the instrument, but retired the instrument as it was too problematic to use.

The album was released in 1978 by Virgin Records, originally as a limited edition translucent green vinyl before the standard version replaced it shortly afterwards. The album cover features a distinctive "pyramid fish" design by English writer John Michell. Green peaked at number 30 on the UK Albums Chart and was a critical success. Green was remastered for CD release in both 1990 and 2007.

== Background and writing ==
Hillage's second album L (1976) had been a surprise success, garnering critical praise and reaching number 10 on the UK Albums Chart and staying on the chart for twelve weeks. As a result, Hillage and his band were offered the chance to open for Electric Light Orchestra on their American tour in early 1977. Whilst they were based in Los Angeles during the tour, Hillage and his collaborator and songwriting partner Miquette Giraudy met synthesizer pioneer Malcolm Cecil, whose work with the Tonto's Expanding Head Band and Stevie Wonder had influenced Hillage's work on L. With Hillage wanting to head into funkier territory, Cecil agreed to produce Hillage's third album.

Hillage and Giraudy wrote enough material for two albums during an "intense period" in spring 1977; Hillage recalled "when we were coming back from our first American tour we were on a creative high and a lot of music came out." Hillage's original idea was to release the material on two separate albums, The Red Album and The Green Album; however, the plan was abandoned and instead The Red Album was reworked to become Motivation Radio, recorded in July 1977 and produced by Cecil, and true to Hillage's wishes, the album was funkier in nature, "although still undeniably Hillage". Hillage recalled that Motivation Radio was "the moment where the dance/funk thing began to manifest itself and even then that came out of an unusual and interesting experience." The album was Hillage's first with Joe Blocker on drums and bass guitarist Reggie McBride. A critical success, it was released in September 1977 and although not as commercially successful as L, it still reached number 28 on the UK Albums Chart. To coincide with the release of Motivation Radio, a new-line up of Steve Hillage's band featuring Blocker on drums, Curtis Robinson Jr on bass guitar and Chuck Bynum on keyboards and synths toured throughout the UK and Europe in late 1977, ending with a performance at The Rainbow in London. The band were due to tour America thereafter but the tour was abandoned after the deemed commercial failure of Motivation Radio, leaving them ready to record again.

== Conception and recording ==
"The original idea was to divide the material into two albums, The Red Album and The Green Album. That got abandoned when the first album became Motivation Radio, but we decided to stick with the title Green for the next album."

— Steve Hillage referring to the original plans for the material written in spring 1977.

Within weeks of the end of their 1977 tour, Hillage and his new band returned to the residential recording studio Ridge Farm Studio in Dorking, Surrey, in December 1977 to record a new album. He decided to record the material he had written for the abandoned Green Album in spring 1977, shortening the name to Green. Pink Floyd drummer Nick Mason co-produced and engineered the album with Hillage. Pink Floyd were on a break following their In the Flesh Tour and most of its members developed solo projects in 1978 before regrouping at the end of the year to record The Wall; Mason decided to spend his time producing another artist's album. Mason was introduced to the sessions in a similar style to how Todd Rundgren was introduced to the L sessions–Virgin Records' A&R head Simon Draper told Hillage that Mason was aware of his music and was interested in producing or co-producing an album with him. Hillage thought it would be a "great experience and was really up for it". The two had previously worked together when Mason produced Shamal (1976), the seventh album by Hillage's former band Gong. Curtis Robertson also augmented the sessions on bass guitar.

After a break for Christmas, sessions commenced at Hillage's Matrix Studios, London, in January 1978 where further overdubs were recorded before they went to Pink Floyd's Britannia Row Studios, also in London, in February. Hillage recalled "Our schedule at the time could be described as 'full on.' Our work pace was frantic and it was an exhilarating roller coaster ride which I'm happy to have experienced, although it wasn't sustainable. Green was the result of three months in the studio. Joe and Curtis took part in the initial sessions and then I took the basic backing tracks away to work out overdubs in my little home studio and then we went back into Britannia Row Studios to finish everything."

== Music ==
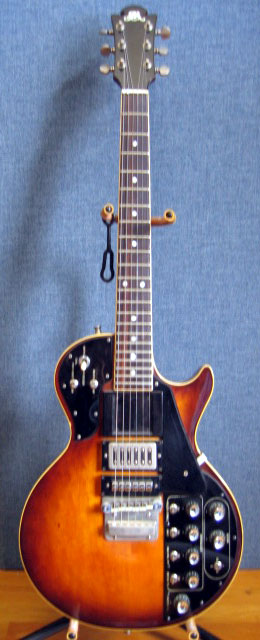
Hillage extensively used a Roland GR-500 guitar synthesizer on Green.

Greg Prato of Allmusic described Green as "the underground prog rock fan favorite [issuing] more of his trademark thinking-man's music." He noted that it possesses many of the same musical qualities as mid-to-late 1970s Pink Floyd due to Mason's production, and that the music is similar to David Bowie's late 1970s experimental electronic phase, singling out "Crystal City" "with vocals almost identical to Bowie". Hillage's recurring science fiction influence continues to be felt on Green, and according to Prato this is especially apparent on such tracks as "Sea Nature", "UFO Over Paris", and "Unidentified (Flying Being)". According to Elly Roberts of Allgigs, Hillage spent 1978 exploring many soundscapes that included synthesisers and rock guitar, and was best exemplified by the Green song "Ether Ships". Green has been described as "partially mixed" due to the segues between songs.

Green was significant for Hillage as he began to experiment with early guitar synthesizers for the first time; he had acquired a Roland GR 500 guitar synthesizer which he uses extensively on the album; "It was an amazing instrument that proved to be okay for studio work, but was too complicated to use on stage." Most of the guitar and some of the keyboard sounds on Green were achieved using the GR 500, and Hillage later stated that for him "the hybrid sounds [he] achieved were really special," but due to the complexities of using the instrument in the studio, he eventually opted for a more "back to basic" approach from thereafter. Hillage also played a Moog synthesizer and glissando guitar on the album.

Green is also noted for its often "dancey" tones–a continuation of the funk sound explored on Motivation Radio. Terra Scope noted that Hillage had been championing punk rock whilst at the same time his music "was nodding in a dance direction even then", to which Hillage recalled that "we got more and more into funk and quite into disco and also electronics. In fact we were very much into German psychedelic music like Neu!, Can and stuff like that and of course these are all constituent parts of what eventually produced the explosion of dance music and we were in there early. I remember we did a Steve Hillage Band gig in a club in Plymouth in 1978 around the time of the Green album and before we played there was a disco. The DJ was playing Kraftwerk, stuff from The Man-Machine like "Robots" and "Spacelab", and all these young dolly birds were dancing. I'd never seen that kind of dance music in a commercial context before, and it was quite a good sound system, quite loud, and I was getting into how they got the electronic sounds so neat and tidy and the kick drums had this nice sonic edge coming through the speakers. I just had this vision, I thought fuck, electronic dance music, my God, it's going to be massive and this was 1978! Then as it evolved during the years when I was a record producer I kept track of all this."

=== Songs ===
"Music of the Trees" was described by Elly Roberts of Allgigs as "a gorgeous acoustic lead beauty with splashes of synth-guitar and bluesy guitar solos", while she described "Palm Trees" as "possibly his most beautiful song ever; again synth effects drench this wonderful piece. In sharp contrast, "Unidentified" turns out be a funk laden thump, heavy basslines with swirling synths." The latter song was described by Hillage as "one of our funkiest and danciest tracks". "Leylines to Glassdom" was worked on by Hillage before beginning his first band, Khan, and was revisited and re-recorded during the recording of Motivation Radio, although this version was only released as a promotional single and was re-recorded altogether for Green in a longer format. "The Glorious OM Riff" is a remake of the song "Master Builder" from the Gong album You (1974), which Hillage had a hand in composing with the other members of Gong. The song is "a cacophonous blast, with masses of ear-splitting solos", and it has been noted that "the seeds of [Hillage's] future direction were sown here."

== Release and promotion ==
The limited edition green vinyl version of Green.

Green was released in April 1978 by Virgin Records, only seven months after the release of Motivation Radio. It was originally released in limited-edition translucent green vinyl, before a standard black vinyl edition replaced it a couple of weeks later. The green vinyl pressing also included a poster of Hillage superimposed on a mountain range, with the pyramid fish symbol from the album cover superimposed on his face, and an insert with lyrics and additional album information. The cover features a distinctive "pyramid fish" design by John Michell–an English writer and painter with a particular interest in numbers and geometric shapes. His design is based on the medieval vesica piscis shape–the intersection between two equal-sized circles where the centre of each lies on the circumference of the other. The Virgin catalogue number for this album on vinyl was V2098.

The album entered the UK Albums Chart on 29 April 1978, where it stayed for eight weeks, hitting a peak of number 30, slightly less successful than Motivation Radio, which peaked at number 28. Hillage undertook an extensive tour in promotion of Green around the UK and France from April to June 1978, with a band featuring Hillage and Giraudy with Andy Anderson on drums, Christian Boule on guitar and John Mackenzie on bass guitar. In the summer of 1978, they played further festival appearances at The Deeply Vale Free Festival and the Ashton Court Festival in Bristol, followed by two shows at the Marquee Club in London on 7–8 August.

Green was remastered and re-released on CD in 1990 by Virgin Records in the UK and by Caroline Blue Plate in the US. It was remastered once more in 2007 for CD release by Virgin Records, this time featuring four bonus tracks: "Unidentified (Flying Being) and "Octave Doctors" recorded at Glastonbury Festival in 1979, "Not Fade Away (Glid Forever)" recorded at the Rainbow Theatre in 1977, and an alternate mix of "Meditation of the Snake". According to the liner notes of this reissue, "whilst researching this expanded edition of Green, the decision was made to locate suitable pertinent bonus tracks."

== Critical reception ==
Professional ratings
Review scores
Source	Rating
AllMusic	3.5/5 stars
Debaser	5/5 stars
Musikexpress	4/6

According to Mark Powell, who wrote the sleeve notes for the reissue, Green "earned a well deserved place in the affections of the Hillage faithful." The album was favourably reviewed by music critics. Liam Mackey of Hot Press said "don't be put off by the disconcerting packaging should you spot in your local shop. The music itself is infinitely more accessible even if it does require some patient listening before offering complete satisfaction. And just as all good things mature with age, you can be assured that Green will still be rewarding you handsomely long after the next musical fad has come and gone."

The album continued to receive acclaim in later times. Greg Prato of AllMusic said that, "although not as consistent as some of his other albums, it certainly has its moments." He praised the inclusion of the backing band that had appeared on Hillage's earlier album Motivation Radio "which helps make Hillage's twisted songs even better", saying that "like his other albums, the musicianship is top-notch." He concluded that "Hillage fans will definitely not be disappointed with Green." Elly Roberts of Allgigs was very favourable, saying "in true Prog Rock fashion, Hillage was totally unpredictable; this is why he's still revered to this day." Italian website Debaser rated the album at five stars out of five. German magazine Musikexpress rated the album at four stars out of six.

In a "Buyer's Guide" to Hillage's solo works in 2014, Team Rock said that Green remains Hillage's best solo album, saying that Mason "helped to bring out some quite astonishing guitar performances. At a time when punk was raging hard, with Green Hillage calmly proved that not only was he a virtuoso master of the guitar, but also that he could bring out the distinctive colour of any composition, by knowing when not to play. Tracks like "Sea Nature", "Musik of the Trees" and "The Glorious Om Riff" are spellbinding by the way Hillage envisages music in three dimensions. Overall the album was a magnificent fruition of his dramatic purpose."

In 2004, Polish journalist Jerzy Skarżyński included the album in the first volume of his list of "Unforgettable Albums in Rock History", published as the book Niezapomniane płyty historii rocka. It was one of 99 different albums listed in Volume One, which only lists albums from 1967 to 1979, and one of 199 albums listed altogether.

== Legacy ==
In the words of Powell, "despite the punk rock explosion, demand for Steve Hillage's music appeared to be unabated. The pressure remained relentless." Hillage spent the rest of 1978 compiling a series of recordings made in concert over the previous eighteen months, Live Herald, and commenced work on another studio album, Rainbow Dome Musick, "a unique journey into the world of ambient music" released in 1979. This album furthered Hillage's interest in electronic music as established on Green and was later ranked as one of the 1,000 greatest albums of all time by The Guardian. For Mason, Green was the last album by another artist that he produced or co-produced, choosing to start a collaborative solo career in the 1980s, beginning with Nick Mason's Fictitious Sports (1981).

== Track listing ==
Side one
No.	Title	Length
1.	"Sea Nature"	6:43
2.	"Ether Ships"	5:02
3.	"Musik of the Trees"	4:53
4.	"Palm Trees (Love Guitar)"	5:19

Side two
No.	Title	Writer(s)	Length
5.	"Unidentified (Flying Being)"	Hillage, Giraudy, Curtis Robertson	4:30
6.	"U.F.O. Over Paris"	Hillage, Giraudy, Robertson, Joe Blocker, Charles Bynum	3:11
7.	"Leylines to Glassdom"		4:06
8.	"Crystal City"		3:36
9.	"Activation Meditation"		1:03
10.	"The Glorious Om Riff"	Daevid Allen, Tim Blake, Hillage, Mike Howlett, Didier Malherbe, Pierre Moerlen, Benoit Moerlen, Mireille Bauer, Giraudy, Gilli Smyth	7:46

Bonus tracks for CD release 2007
No.	Title	Length
11.	"Unidentified (Flying Being)" (Live at Glastonbury 1979)	4:53
12.	"Not Fade Away (Glid Forever)" (Live at The Rainbow Theatre 1977)	7:28
13.	"Octave Doctors" (Live at Glastonbury 1979)	3:40
14.	"Meditation of the Snake" (alternative mix)	3:16

== Personnel ==
- Steve Hillage – vocals, electric guitar, guitar synthesizer, synthesizer, production
- Miquette Giraudy – synthesizer, vocoder, vocals
- Curtis Robertson Jr – bass
- Joe Blocker – drums
- Nick Mason – drum on "Leylines to Glassdom", production

Bonus tracks

- Dave Stewart – rhythm guitar and glissando guitar (live at Glastonbury)
- Paul Francis – bass (live at Glastonbury)
- Andy Anderson – drums on "Ether Ships" and live at Glastonbury
- Christian Boule – rhythm guitar and glissando guitar (live at the Rainbow)
- Colin Bass – bass (live at the Rainbow)
- Phil Hodge – keyboards (live at the Rainbow)
- Basil Brooks – synthesizer (live at the Rainbow)
- Clive Bunker – drums (live at the Rainbow)

== Production ==
- Produced by Nick Mason and Steve Hillage
- Engineered by John Wood
- CD reissue research and co-ordinated by Mark Powell
- CD reissue compiled by Steve Hillage and Mark Powell
