= BBC Radio 1 Live: Steve Hillage Live in Concert =

Steve Hillage Live in Concert

Live album by Steve Hillage
- Released: 30 March 1992
- Recorded: 4 December 1976 and 28 April 1979
- Venue: Paris Theatre, London
- Genre: Progressive rock
- Length: 70:33
- Label: Windsong International
- Producer: Chris Lycett, Jeff Griffin

Steve Hillage chronology
And Not Or (1983)	Steve Hillage Live in Concert (1992)	Light In The Sky (2003)

Professional ratings
Review scores
Source	Rating
Allmusic	4/5 stars

BBC Radio 1 Live : Steve Hillage Live in Concert is a live album by British progressive rock musician Steve Hillage, originally recorded for the BBC at the Paris Theatre, London. Tracks 1 and 6 are from the performance from 4 December 1976 and were produced by Jeff Griffin. The remaining tracks are from 28 April 1979 and were produced by Chris Lycett.

== Track listing ==
Music and lyrics by Steve Hillage unless otherwise specified.

1. "Hurdy Gurdy Glissando" (Miquette Giraudy, Steve Hillage) − 10:59
2. "Unidentified (Flying Being)" (Miquette Giraudy, Steve Hillage) − 10:16
3. "Radio" − 7:43
4. "New Age Synthesis (Unzipping the Zype)" (Andy Anderson, Miquette Giraudy, Steve Hillage) − 8:30
5. "Electrick Gypsies" − 4:51
6. "The Salmon Song" − 7:24
7. "It's All Too Much" (George Harrison) − 6:24
8. "1988 Aktivator" − 2:31
9. "Crystal City" − 3:21
10. "Activation Meditation" − 1:10
11. "The Glorious Om Riff" (Gong) − 7:24

== Personnel ==
- Steve Hillage − lead guitar, vocals
- Christian Boule − guitar (tracks: 2 to 5, 7 to 11)
- Miquette Giraudy − synthesizer and backing vocals (tracks: 2 to 5, 7 to 11)
- John McKenzie − bass guitar (tracks: 2 to 5, 7 to 11)
- Andy Anderson − drums and percussion (tracks: 2 to 5, 7 to 11)

== Production ==
- Chris Lycett − producer (tracks: 2 to 5, 7 to 11)
- Jeff Griffin − producer (tracks: 1, 6)

== Release information ==
Year	Type	Label	Catalogue #	Country
1992	CD	Windsong International	WIN CD 014	UK
1994	CD	Griffin Music	GCD-327-2	Canada
