= Live Herald =

Live album / studio album by Steve Hillage
- Released: 26 January 1979
- Recorded: 1977–1978 (live); 1978 (studio)
- Venue: Rainbow Theatre, London; Marquee Club, London; Oxford Polytechnic, Oxford
- Studio: Sawmills, Fowey, Cornwall
- Genre: Progressive rock
- Label: Virgin
- Producer: Steve Hillage

Steve Hillage chronology
Green (1978)	Live Herald (1979)	Rainbow Dome Musick (1979)

Professional ratings
Review scores
Source	Rating
Music Week	4/4 stars

Live Herald is a part live, part studio album by British progressive rock musician Steve Hillage released by Virgin Records in January 1979.

The live tracks were recorded at several concerts in England in 1977 and 1978, and the studio tracks, which occupied side 4 of the original vinyl release, were recorded in late 1978. On CD releases, the studio tracks were removed and added instead to the studio album Open, originally released later the same year.

== Track listing ==
Track listing, recording dates and track times are taken from the liner notes of the original 1979 double album.

Side one
No.	Title	Writer(s)	Notes	Length
1.	"Salmon Song"	Hillage, Giraudy	recorded 26 March 1977 at the Rainbow Theatre, London	7:36
2.	"The Dervish Riff"	Hillage	recorded 26 March 1977 at the Rainbow Theatre, London	4:17
3.	"Castle in the Clouds/Hurdy Gurdy Man"	Hillage/Donovan	recorded 26 March 1977 at the Rainbow Theatre, London	7:02

Side two
No.	Title	Writer(s)	Notes	Length
4.	"Light in the Sky"	Hillage, Giraudy	recorded 25 May 1978 at Oxford Polytechnic	5:16
5.	"Searching for the Spark"	Hillage, Giraudy	recorded 7 August 1978 at the Marquee Club, London	11:11
6.	"Electrick Gypsies"	Hillage	recorded 3 November 1977 at the Rainbow Theatre, London	5:55

Side three
No.	Title	Writer(s)	Notes	Length
7.	"Radiom/Lunar Musick Suite/Meditation of the Dragon"	Hillage/Hillage, Giraudy/Hillage	recorded 26 March 1977 at the Rainbow Theatre, London	15:23
8.	"It's All Too Much/The Golden Vibe"	Harrison/Hillage	recorded 25 May 1978 at Oxford Polytechnic	6:47

Side four (Studio side)
No.	Title	Writer(s)	Notes	Length
9.	"Talking to the Sun" (Omitted from all CD releases)	Hillage, Giraudy	recorded at Sawmills Studio, Fowey, Cornwall	5:56
10.	"1988 Aktivator" (Omitted from all CD releases)	Hillage	recorded at Sawmills Studio, Fowey, Cornwall	2:30
11.	"New Age Synthesis (Unzipping the Zype)" (Omitted from all CD releases)	Hillage, Giraudy, Anderson, McKenzie	recorded at Sawmills Studio, Fowey, Cornwall	8:47
12.	"Healing Feeling" (Omitted from all CD releases)	Hillage, Giraudy	recorded at Sawmills Studio, Fowey, Cornwall	6:09

Bonus tracks for 2007 CD release
No.	Title	Writer(s)	Notes	Length
9.	"Solar Musick Suite"	Hillage	recorded in 1977 at the Rainbow Theatre, London	14:37

== Musicians and production ==
Musicians

- Steve Hillage − guitar, synthesiser, vocals (all tracks)
- Miquette Giraudy − synthesiser, sequencer, bells (all tracks)
- Christian Boulé − glissando and rhythm guitar (side 1, tracks 1 to 3; side 2, tracks 1 and 2; side 3, tracks 1 and 2)
- Phil Hodge − keyboards (side 1, tracks 1 to 3; side 3, track 1)
- Basil Brooks − synthesiser, sequencer, flute (side 1, tracks 1 to 3; side 3, track 1)
- Colin Bass − bass, vocals (side 1, tracks 1 to 3; side 3, track 1)
- Clive Bunker − drums (side 1, tracks 1 to 3; side 3, track 1)
- Curtis Robertson − bass (side 2, track 3)
- Joe Blocker − drums, vocals (side 2, track 3)
- John McKenzie − bass, vocals (side 2, tracks 1 and 2; side 3, track 2, side 4, tracks 1 to 4)
- Andy Anderson − drums, percussion (side 2, tracks 1 and 2; side 3, track 2; side 4, tracks 1 to 4)

Production

- Steve Hillage − producer (all tracks)
- Trevor White − engineer, Maison Rouge mobile studio, side 1, tracks 1 to 3; side 3, track 1
- Malcolm Heeley − engineer, Manor Mobile recording studio, side 2, track 1; side 3, track 2
- Jeremy Allom − engineer, Manor Mobile recording studio, side 2, track 2
- Phil Newell − engineer, Manor Mobile recording studio, side 2, track 3
- Simon Fraser − engineer, side 4, tracks 1 to 4

== Release information ==
Year	Type	Label	Catalogue #	Country
1979	LP	Virgin	VGD3502	UK
1990	CD	Virgin	CDVM3502	UK
2007	CD Remaster	Virgin	CDVMR3502	UK
