= Steve Hillage =

British guitarist (born 1951)

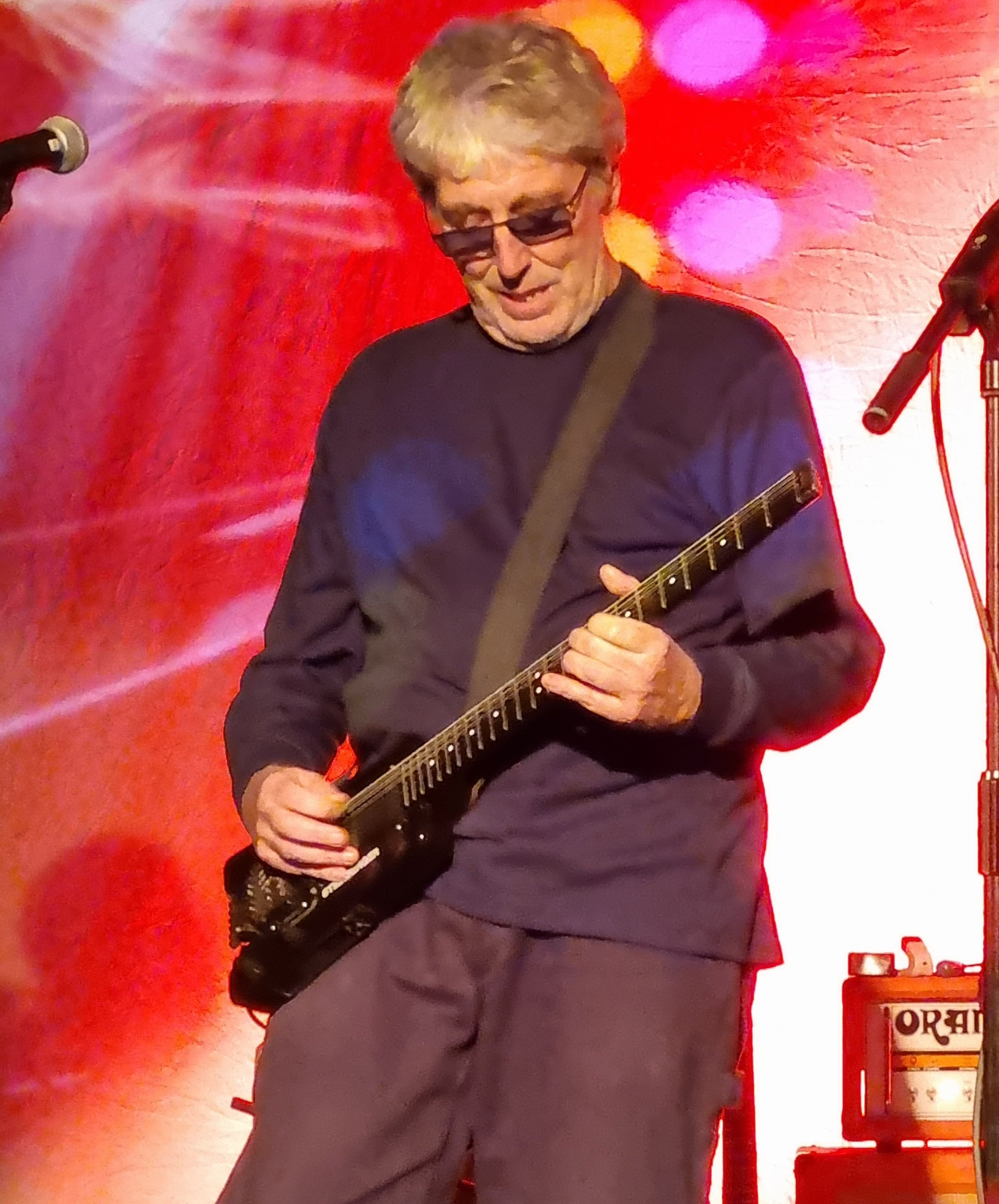
- Hillage performing in Cambridge in 2023

Background information
- Born: Stephen Simpson Hillage; 2 August 1951 (age 75); Chingford, Essex, England
- Genres: Canterbury scene; space rock; progressive rock; jazz fusion; psychedelic rock; electronica
- Instruments: Guitar, vocals, keyboards
- Years active: 1967–present
- Label: Virgin/EMI Records
- Website: stevehillage.com

Stephen Simpson Hillage (born 2 August 1951) is an English musician, best known as a guitarist. He is associated with the Canterbury scene and has worked in experimental domains since the late 1960s. Besides his solo recordings he has been a member of Uriel, Khan, Gong and System 7.

== History ==
=== Bands 1968–75 ===
Hillage was born in Chingford, which was then in Essex but is now part of Greater London. Whilst still at school, he joined his first band, a blues rock band called Uriel, with Dave Stewart, Mont Campbell and Clive Brooks. The band split up in 1968 with the other members going on to form Egg, but they briefly re-united under assumed names to record the album Arzachel in 1969. Hillage also guested on Egg's 1974 album The Civil Surface.

In 1969, Hillage began studies at the University of Kent in Canterbury, befriending local bands Caravan and Spirogyra and occasionally jamming with them. Meanwhile, he wrote songs and, by late 1970, had accumulated enough material for an album. Caravan put him in touch with their manager Terry King, who got Hillage signed with Deram on the basis of a demo of his material recorded with the help of Dave Stewart of Egg. In early 1971, Hillage formed Khan with bassist/vocalist Nick Greenwood, formerly of Crazy World of Arthur Brown. Although future Gong and Hatfield and the North drummer Pip Pyle was involved in the early stages, the line-up finally settled with the inclusion of organist Dick Heninghem and drummer Eric Peachey, both of whom had recently collaborated on Greenwood's solo project Cold Cuts, recorded in California in 1970 but belatedly released in 1972.

Following a series of concerts throughout 1971, several of them supporting label mates Caravan, Khan began recording their debut album in November, by which time Heninghem had left, forcing Hillage to bring in his former bandmate Dave Stewart to play the keyboard parts. By the time Space Shanty came out in May 1972, Canadian Val Stevens (formerly of Toronto's popular soul-rock band Grant Smith & The Power) had filled the vacancy, making his debut on a short European tour (including a televised appearance at the Montreux Festival) and continuing with a UK tour supporting Caravan in June.

By then, musical disagreements between Hillage and Greenwood culminated with the latter's departure. Hillage decided to form a new line-up with a slightly different direction, retaining the services of Peachey and asking Stewart back, and adding Nigel Griggs (later of Split Enz) on bass. New compositions by Hillage and Stewart were added to the repertoire, including "I Love Its Holy Mystery", which would form the basis of Hillage's later Solar Musick Suite. Hillage broke up the band in October 1972.

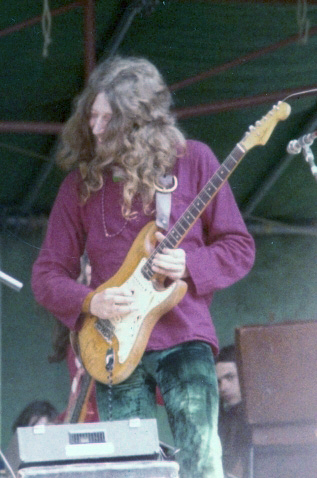
Hillage playing Hyde Park with Gong, 1974

Hillage promptly joined Kevin Ayers' new live band Decadence, participating in Ayers' 1973 album Bananamour (Harvest, May 1973) and touring the UK and France for two months. Having in the meantime become a fan of Gong after meeting Daevid Allen, hearing Camembert Electrique and Allen's solo album Banana Moon, as well as meeting his longtime partner Miquette Giraudy through Allen, Hillage stayed in France after the Ayers tour to join the band.

In January 1973, he took part in the sessions for Flying Teapot, the first installment of the "Radio Gnome" trilogy, and soon after graduated to full-time membership with the departure of bassist/lead guitarist Christian Tritsch. The 'classic' line-up of Gong was now in place, with Daevid Allen, Gilli Smyth, Didier Malherbe, Tim Blake, Mike Howlett and Pierre Moerlen, and recorded two further albums, Angels Egg and You (the latter also featuring Giraudy).

In June 1973, Hillage (along with Pierre Moerlen) participated in the debut live performance of Mike Oldfield's Tubular Bells at Queen Elizabeth Hall. Both Hillage and Moerlen also took part in a live-in-studio performance filmed for the BBC's Second House series, filmed in November 1973. The BBC performance is available on Oldfield's Elements DVD.

From August 1974 to February 1975 Hillage worked on his debut solo album Fish Rising at Manor Studios with the group, less Allen and Smyth, and contributions from others such former as Khan bandmate Dave Stewart.

Blake left Gong at the beginning of 1975 due to tensions with Allen, then Allen abruptly left in April. Hillage continued with the group, but he increasingly became uncomfortable feeling that Virgin wanted him to assume a leadership role which he saw at odds to the group's communal essence. After a Marquee gig on 21 December, he left to set-up his own band, although he did contribute to the sessions of their next album Shamal.

=== Solo 1976–79 ===
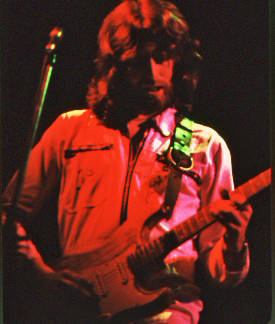
Hillage in concert, circa 1978

For his first post-Gong solo work, Hillage and Giraudy relocated to Woodstock, New York in May and June 1976 to record with Todd Rundgren and his band Utopia on L, which included covers of "Hurdy Gurdy Man" and "It's All Too Much" that became integral to his live set. The album was released on 24 September and spent 12 weeks on the UK album chart peaking at #10. Needing to tour to promote the album, he put together a band with Christian Boulé (guitar), Clive Bunker (drums), Colin Bass (bass), Phil Hodge (keyboards) and Basil Brooks (synthesiser, flute). They debuted supporting Queen at a free Hyde Park, London concert on 18 September, then toured heavily in the UK and France to promote the album including a BBC Radio 1 In Concert broadcast. In January and February 1977 they supported Electric Light Orchestra on their US tour and appeared on the German television music programme Rockpalast in March.

In May 1977, Hillage was part of a live performance of Mike Oldfield's Tubular Bells in Glasgow with the Scottish National Orchestra. He participated in the Gong re-union concert in Paris as part of the trilogy band, a solo set and also accompanied Blake. In late summer, Hillage produced Nik Turner's Xitintoday album which featured contributions from other Gong members, Harry Williamson and drummer Andy Anderson. Hillage also contributed to Williamson's protest single "Nuclear Waste" issued as The Radio Actors with lead vocals by Sting.

During the US tour Hillage had taken an interest in funk music and became disheartened that he was being perceived as "progressive rock" and so deliberately chose to move in that direction. He had met Malcolm Cecil of Tonto's Expanding Head Band who he felt may help in his pursuit of a new style and in July they entered the Record Plant studio in Los Angeles to record Motivation Radio. A new band was put together with Reggie McBride on bass and Joe Blocker on drums, although Curtis Robertson Jr. took over bass duties for the live dates. The album was issued in September and the band toured through to November visiting Germany, France and the UK.

Retaining his touring band, from December into February 1978 he recorded the album Green co-produced with Nick Mason at Ridge Farm Studio and Britannia Row Studios. For the supporting tour, he refreshed his band with Anderson (who had made an appearance on the album) being joined by John McKenzie on bass and Boulé rejoining from the L touring band. On 25 August, Hillage guested with Sham 69 during their performance at the Reading Festival,

Hillage felt he was nearing exhaustion by mid-1978 so chose to reflect on the live shows that had been recorded and compile the album Live Herald. With Anderson and McKenzie from the Green tour, he recorded some studio sessions at the end of the year to be included on one side of the album, then promoted its February 1979 release with live dates including an appearance on Rock Goes to College and a BBC Radio 1 In Concert broadcast.

In January 1979, Hillage and Giraudy recorded the commissioned album Rainbow Dome Musick at Om Studios, consisting of two side-long beatless instrumentals described as "a relaxing and pleasantly divergent journey through a sorted spectrum of instruments". The album was issued on 13 April and performed for the Festival for Mind Body and Spirit at Olympia London that month. Rainbow Dome was a concept created by Rupert Atwill.

Stewart and Paul Francis joined, replacing Boulé and McKenzie respectively, and this line-up played the 1979 Glastonbury Festival. The group recorded Open at Ridge Farm Studio in August with a guest contribution from Jean-Philippe Rykiel. The album was released on 12 October followed by a tour of the UK, Germany, France and the Netherlands through to December.

=== Producer 1980–89 ===
During the 1980s, Hillage worked as a record producer, working for artists such as Simple Minds, It Bites, Murray Head, Nash the Slash, Real Life, Cock Robin, Tony Banks, Ken Lockie and Robyn Hitchcock.

In 1982, Hillage and Giraudy issued the albums For To Next and And Not Or, the last studio albums issued under Hillage's own name. The titles were derived from BASIC programming language and reflect the pair's movement into computer-based music production, this being mainly synthetic except for Hillage's guitar.

He returned to producing in the 1990s, working on The Charlatans 1994 album Up to Our Hips.

=== Electronica 1989–present ===
After hearing the likes of The Orb playing his 1979 ambient record Rainbow Dome Musick, Hillage and Giraudy began performing in the early 1990s as ambient dance act System 7. They soon became part of the underground dance scene in London and Hillage was also a key figure in getting the Glastonbury Festival to recognise the dance scene and set up the Dance Tent, which he programmed in its first year. Hillage also produced in the 1990s a raï musical show called '1, 2, 3 Soleils', featuring Algerian singers Faudel, Rachid Taha and Khaled. He also arranged many songs of Latifa.

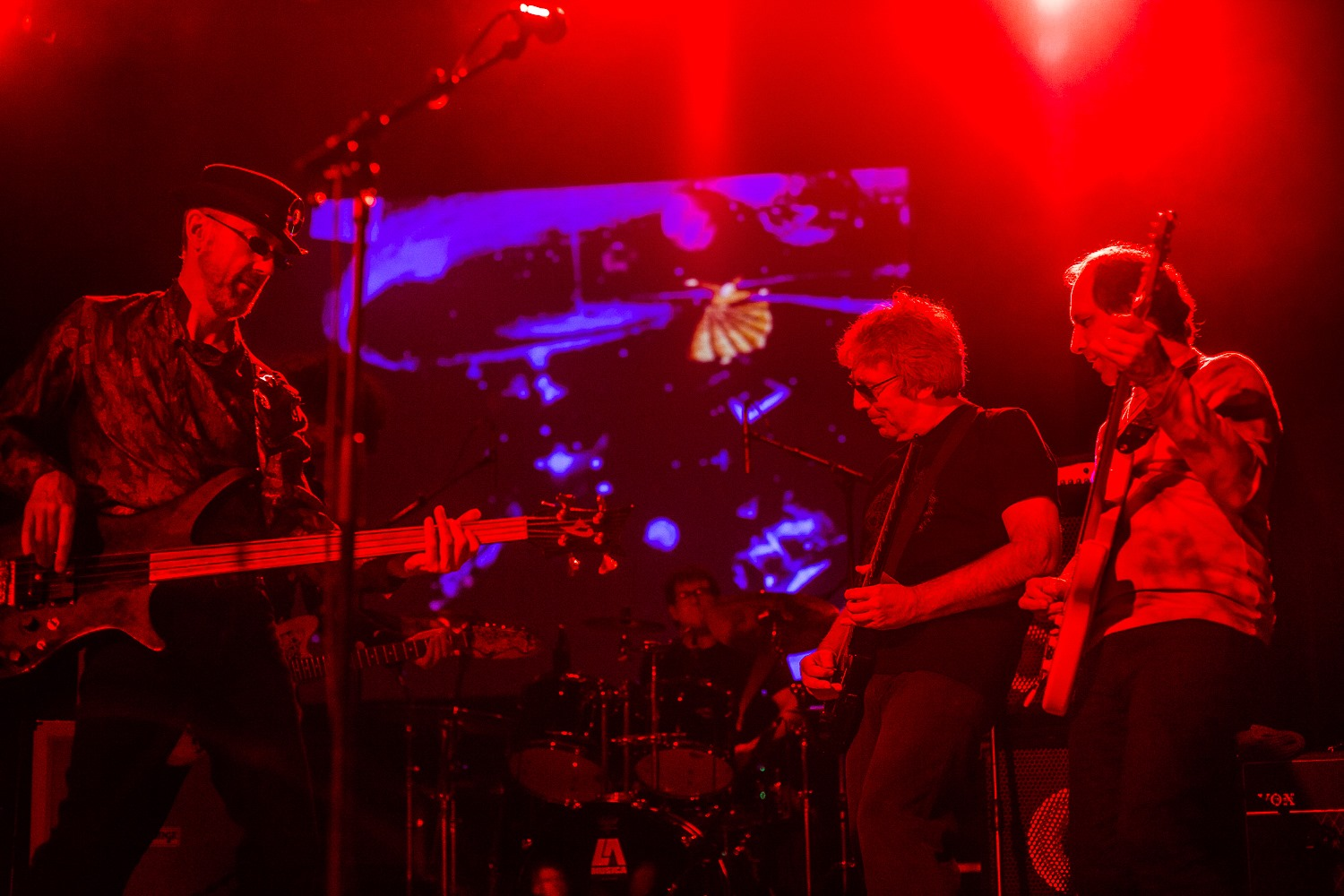
Steve Hillage - Vooruit (Gent) - december 2019

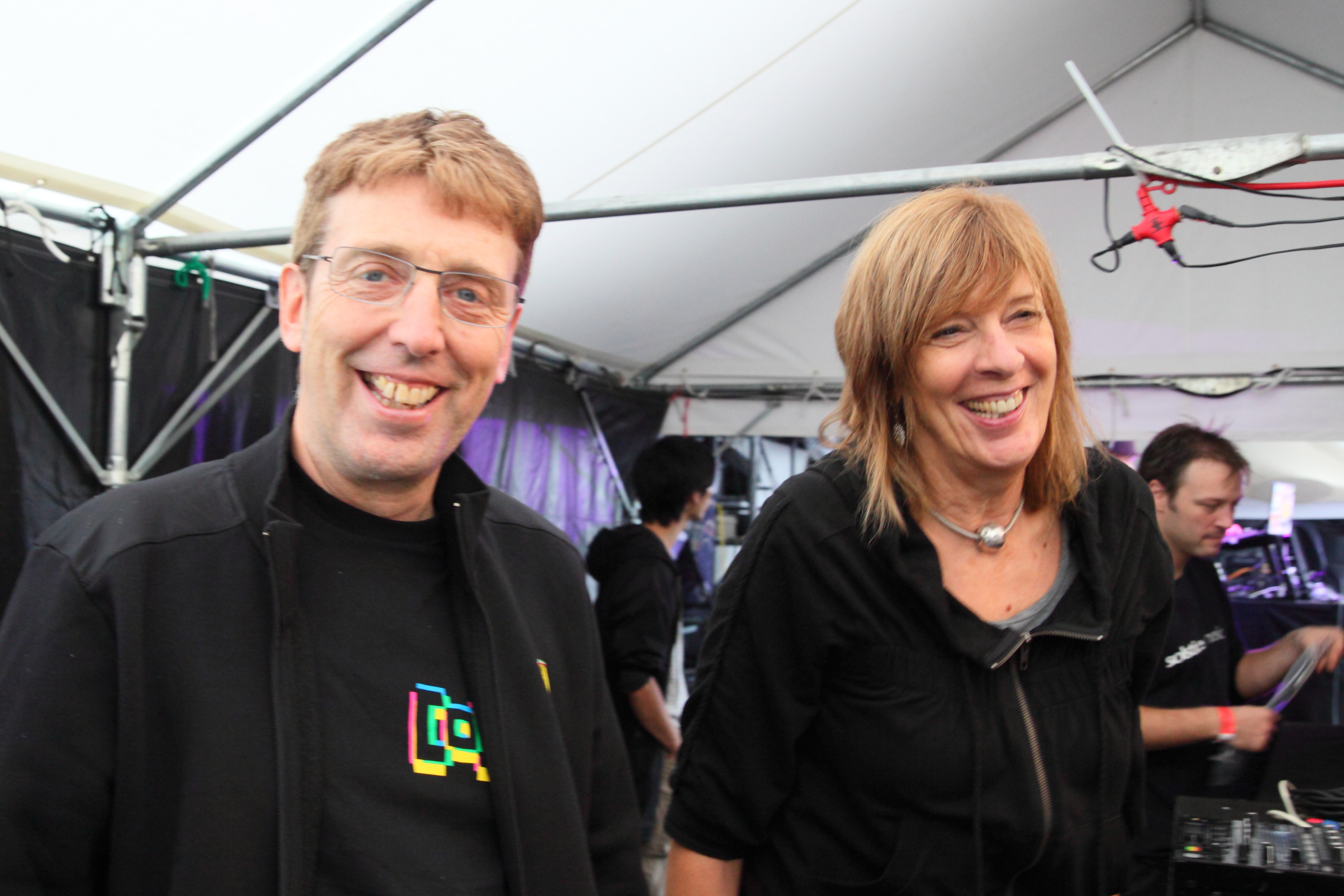
Steve Hillage and Miquette Giraudy, 2010

In November 2006, he made a surprise return to the Gong fold when he and Giraudy performed with (most of) the "classic era" lineup of Gong performing a set consisting almost entirely of material from the Radio Gnome Trilogy and Camembert Electrique at the Gong Unconvention at the Melkweg in Amsterdam.

In January 2007, four of his albums – Fish Rising, L, Motivation Radio and Rainbow Dome Musick – were released in the UK remastered on CD, each, except the latter, with previously unreleased bonus tracks. In February 2007, Green, Live Herald, Open and For To Next/And Not Or followed, similarly remastered with bonus content.

Hillage and Giraudy's participation in the Gong Unconvention was reprised in a small number of concerts held by Gong in London in June 2008, where Hillage and Giraudy were among the line-up which also included Daevid Allen, Gilli Smyth, and Mike Howlett. At these concerts, Hillage would often open the show performing "Steve Hillage Band" material, as he had at the Uncon. Hillage and Giraudy worked most recently on their 2009 album 2032 (which Hillage also produced), and has continued to tour with the band throughout 2009 and 2010. After the 2010 tour, citing musical differences, Steve & Miquette again parted ways with Gong.

His next association with Gong was a guest guitar solo on the title track of their 2016 album "Rejoice! I'm Dead", their first album recorded after the death of Daevid Allen. Though no longer featuring any original members, the current lineup of Kavus Torabi (guitar/vocals), Fabio Golfetti (guitar/vocals), Dave Sturt (bass), Ian East (saxophone/flute) and Cheb Nettles (drums/vocals) had the blessing of Allen (along with the blessing of other surviving members) to continue using the Gong name. Soon after, Hillage made a few guest appearances at Gong gigs (sometimes being billed as Gong featuring Steve Hillage), culminating in late 2018 with the announcement that Hillage & Giraudy had tapped the current lineup of Gong to be their backing band/opening act for a series of Steve Hillage Band shows in 2019. Continued touring plans for 2020, however, were halted in the wake of the COVID-19 pandemic.

Hillage also collaborated with Ozric Tentacles on the 2004 album Spirals in Hyperspace.

Hillage played live with Hawkwind in December 2015 at The Coronet, London, and also played a one-hour set with Dave Brock and Tim Blake of the band at Hawkwind's Hawkeaster festival in Morecambe, Lancashire at Easter, 2018.

"Light in the Sky", from his 1977 album Motivation Radio, was used as the theme for The Sunday Night Project on Channel 4.

Hillage played on a cover of Elton John's "Rocket Man" on William Shatner's 2011 release Seeking Major Tom.

Hillage won the "Visionary" award at the 2013 Progressive Music Awards.

== Discography ==
The discography of Steve Hillage consists of 9 studio albums, 9 legitimate live albums and one bootleg, 3 compilation albums and seven singles. Before launching a solo career, Hillage recorded with Gong and since leaving has continued to collaborate as an occasional member. From 1991, Hillage has recorded extensively with Miquette Giraudy in their group System 7.

All albums and singles released by Virgin Records; except where indicated.

Studio albums

- Fish Rising (1975) – UK #33
- L (1976) – UK #10, US #130
- Motivation Radio (1977) – UK #28
- Green (1978) – UK #30
- Rainbow Dome Musick (1979) – UK #48
- Open (1979) – UK #71
- For To Next (1982) – UK #48
- And Not Or (1982)
- Evan Marc & Steve Hillage – Dreamtime Submersible (2008, Somnia Records)

Live albums

- Live Herald (1979, Virgin) – UK #54
- Ggggong-Go Long (1991, Oh Boy [unofficial release])
- BBC Radio 1 Live: Steve Hillage Live in Concert (1992, Windsong International)
- Live at Deeply Vale Festival 1978 (2004, Ozit-Morpheus Records)
- Live at The Gong Family Unconvention 2006 (2009, Voiceprint/Gonzo Multimedia) CD & DVD
- Madison Square Garden 1977 (2015, Cleopatra/Purple Pyramid)
- Düsseldorf (2017, Madfish Records) - recorded 1979-03-28 at Philips Halle, Düsseldorf
- The Golden Vibe (2019, Madfish Records) - recorded 1973–05 at Pavillon du Hay, Sens, France (The Gong House)
- LA Forum 31.1.77 (2023, Madfish Records)
- Paris Bataclan 11.12.79 (2024, Madfish Records)

Compilation albums

- Aura (1979, Virgin International) - US-only compilation of tracks from Green, Open, Live Herald and the "Getting Better" single.
- Light in the Sky - Introducing ... Steve Hillage (2003)
- Searching For the Spark (2016, Madfish/Snapper Music) - 22xCD boxset

Singles

- "It's All Too Much" (1976)
- "Hurdy Gurdy Man" (1976)
- "Not Fade Away (Glid Forever)" (1977)
- "Getting Better" (1978)
- "Don't Dither Do It" (1979)
- "Kamakaze Eyes" (1982)
- "Alone" (1982)

Video game soundtracks

- Cyberwar (video game) (1995, Sales Curve Interactive) - with Russ Dunham and Fergus McNeil
