= Harry Williamson (musician) =

British musician, producer and inventor

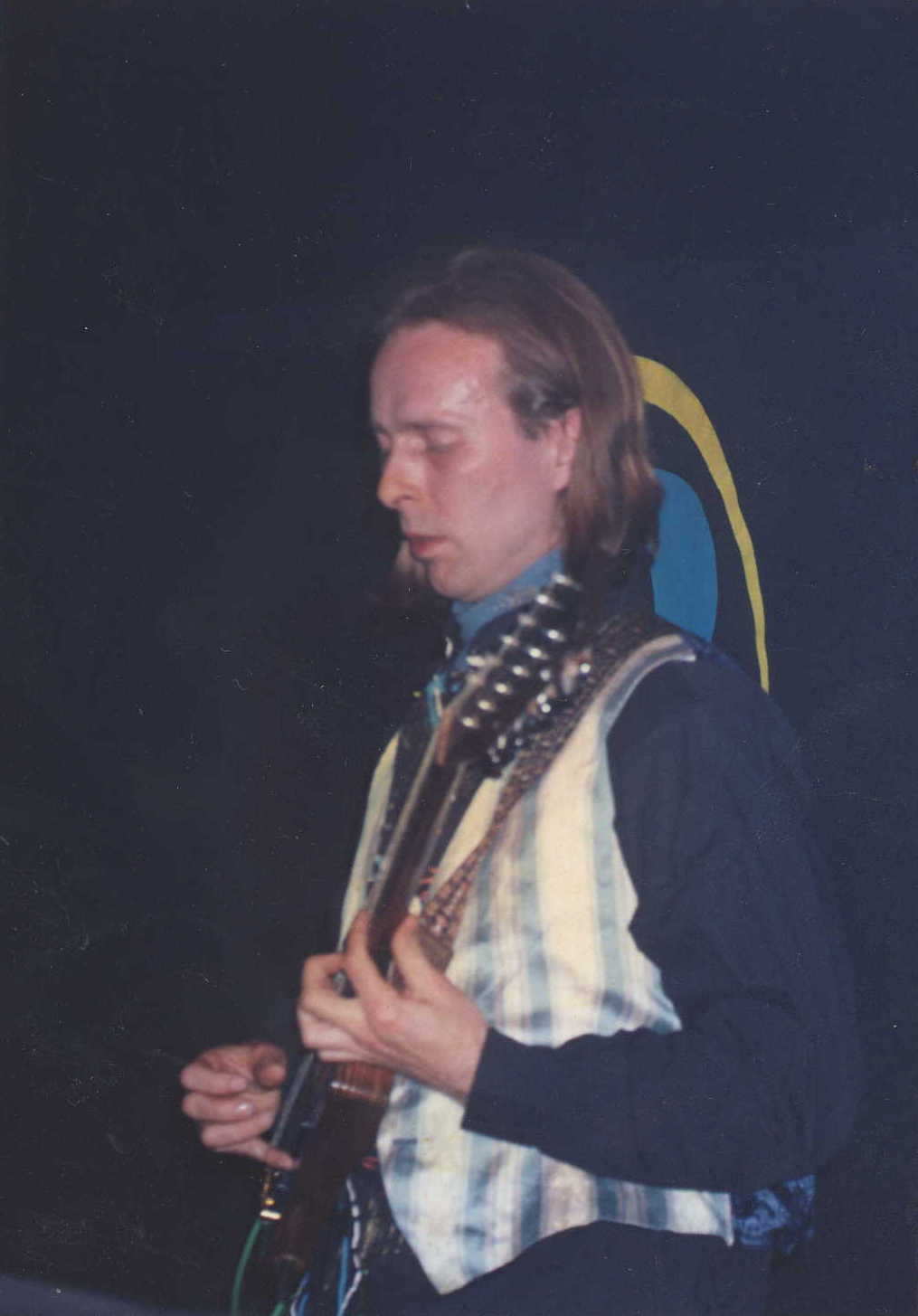

Harry Williamson is a British musician, producer and inventor.

== History ==
Williamson was born in Ilfracombe, North Devon, the son of noted author Henry Williamson and his second wife Christine Duffield. He is divorced, with one daughter, Bee Williamson. He was educated at Exeter Cathedral School under Lionel Frederick Dakers (later head of RSCM), and at Millfield School, Street, Somerset.

He started a Physics degree at Imperial College, University of London, but abandoned Physics for rock theatre, working at Glastonbury Festival and the Rainbow Theatre and crewing for The Rolling Stones in the 1970s. He helped establish the Green Party of England and Wales and is still actively involved in designing innovative energy efficient systems.

In 1970 he met Anthony Phillips of Genesis with whom he composed music for the film of his father's best-seller Tarka the Otter. The music, recorded by the National Philharmonic Orchestra was not used in the film due to budgetary considerations but some years later was finished with funds from Amy International and released by PRT, where it became No. 1 in the New Music Charts for three months. It is still regarded as a classic by Genesis fans and excerpts are used for documentaries and other nature oriented films worldwide. Another series of recordings with Anthony, started in 1975, became Gypsy Suite, released in 1995.

In 1977 Williamson was playing with Nik Turner of Hawkwind and he wrote "Nuclear Waste" which was released as 'The Radio Actors', or 'Fast Breeder & Nuclear Reactors', with Sting on vocals, Mike Howlett on Bass and Steve Hillage on lead guitar. It was released by Virgin Records and later by Charly Records and is still considered an anti-nuclear anthem in Eastern Europe.

In 1978 Williamson met Gilli Smyth, formerly of Gong. They formed Mother Gong, made their first album and toured the United States for the first time as part of the ZU Manifestival promoted by Giorgio Gomelsky. Returning to Devon, they lived at Ox's Cross and he set up his first studio in the building his father had used for writing. They played the Glastonbury Festival twice and after disillusionment with Thatcherite politics, left England in 1982 and emigrated to Melbourne, Australia. They divorced in 1992. Williamson is now an Australian citizen and dedicates his time to composing film, world, and many other styles of music, making concert DVDs, producing recordings from artists around the world and implementing his environmentally-sustainable house designs. With his former partner Liz Van Dort he experimented with ambient and world music and released an album under the banner Faraway. In 2004 with his partner Maribel Steel he completed a musical Lace which deals with life in a Spanish family, and a soundtrack for the film – Rokkashomura Rhapsody a Japanese documentary on nuclear reprocessing in Rokkasho, Aomori.

Tarka was commissioned to launch the book Our Watermark published by the Victorian Women's Trust and received its first live performances in Melbourne in 2010.

Migration was launched in 2012 after a ten-year gestation. It explores the musical forms that originated in Northern India and travelled with the Celts on their epic migrations, influencing music where they settled.

In 2009 he was asked to bring the Federation Bells near Federation Square, Melbourne, a carillon of 39 upturned bells designed for the centenary of Australian Federation, into better working order. In 2011 his company was awarded the contract to refurbish the installation. He designed novel actuators and with his collaborator Ian Wilson, a sophisticated controller that mimics human articulation, which now provide visitors with an interactive experience, including an app for playing the bells live. There are now annual composition competitions and over 1000 original pieces are played in rotation, three times daily. Football fans used to regularly take out their disappointment at losing, on this installation. He instigated the idea of playing team's anthems before and after the matches at the MCG and since then there has been a marked decline in vandalism.

In 2015 Williamson completed a prototype, codenamed "Wind Whisperer", for a wind-driven self-tuning interactive stringed sculptural instrument that plays fractal melodies, continuously changing in response to microscopic changes in the surroundings.

Since 2009 Williamson has also been manufacturing and installing Modular Sound Booths for recording studios and other clients.

== Discography ==
- 1975 – Gypsy Suite (with Anthony Phillips) 1998 Voiceprint
- 1976 – Tarka (with Anthony Phillips) 1988 PRT 1996 Voiceprint
- 1978 - Xitintoday (with Nik Turner's Sphynx) 1978 Charisma
- 1978 – Nuclear Waste (with Sting and the Radio-Actors) (Virgin, Charly, DB, Voiceprint)
- 1978 – Fairy Tales (with Gilli Smyth, Didier Malherbe et al.) (Charly)
- 1981 – Robot Woman 1 (with Mother Gong) (Butt)
- 1983 – Robot Woman 2 (with Mother Gong) (Shanghai)
- 1984 – Living on the Brink (with Gilli and tom the poet) (Ottersongs)
- 1986 – Robot Woman 3 (with Mother Gong) (Shanghai)
- 1986 – Stroking the Tail of the Bird (with Daevid Allen, Gilli Smyth) (Voiceprint)
- 1987 – The Owl and the Tree (with Mother Gong and Daevid Allen) (Demi-Monde) 2004 (Voiceprint)
- 1989 – Buddha's Birthday (with Mother Gong) (Ottersongs)
- 1989 – Wild Child (with Mother Gong) (Demi-Monde)
- 1989 – Gongmaison (with Gongmaison) (Demi-Monde)
- 1990 – Fish in Sky (with Mother Gong) (Ottersongs)
- 1991 – Mothergong Live in the USA 1991 (Ottersongs), 2008 (Voiceprint)
- 1993 – She Made the World (Voiceprint)
- 1998 – Far from the Madding Crowd (Faraway) (with Liz Van Dort) (Voiceprint 1998) (Prikosnovenie 2001)
- 1999 – Life in the Unseen World (with many friends) (Voiceprint)
- 1999 – 22 meanings (with Daevid Allen) (Gliss, via Pinnacle)
- 2000 – Seadrone (meditation with wind spirits) (Sleeping Tiger)
- 2003 – Battle of the Birds (Celtic tale) (Voiceprint)
- 2005 – Fish in Tree (compilation re-issue of Fish and Owl above) (Voiceprint)
- 2005 – Dreaming in English (with Jeltje) (Private Release)
- 2005 – Soleluna (with Soleluna quintet) (Elysian)
- 2008 – The Glissando Orchestra DVD with Daevid Allen, Steve Hillage and others (Daikini)
- 2012 – Migration (with Khalil Gudaz and a cast of thousands)

== Sources ==
- Henry Williamson: Tarka and the Last Romantic by Anne Williamson, Sutton Publishing (1995) ISBN 0-7509-0639-1, paperback edition (1997) ISBN 0-7509-1492-0
