= L (Steve Hillage album) =

Studio album by Steve Hillage
- Released: 24 September 1976
- Recorded: May–June 1976
- Studios: The Secret Sound, Woodstock, New York, U.S.
- Genres: Progressive rock, space rock
- Length: 42:48
- Label: Virgin
- Producer: Todd Rundgren

Steve Hillage chronology
Fish Rising (1975)	L (1976)	Motivation Radio (1977)

Professional ratings
Review scores
Source	Rating
AllMusic	4/5 stars
Mojo	3/5 stars

L is the second studio album by British progressive rock musician Steve Hillage, released by Virgin Records in September 1976.

== Background ==
Guitarist Steve Hillage had risen through the Canterbury music scene, being a key member of the acts Uriel (who recorded under the name Arzachel), Khan, Kevin Ayers's band Decadence and Gong. His first solo album, Fish Rising, had been recorded and released while still a member of Gong, and used the band as his backing musicians. It ended up peaking at number 33 in the UK, higher than any Gong album. On the day before the album's April 11, 1975 release, Gong leader Daevid Allen abruptly quit the band. Hillage was promoted by the record company and media to be the band's new leader as they toured through the rest of 1975, a situation he felt very uncomfortable with. He announced his decision to leave Gong at the end of 1975, playing his final show with them at the Roundhouse on December 21 and contributing guest guitar to only two songs on the February 1976 album Shamal.

Hillage briefly joined Dave Stewart, his old bandmate in Uriel and Khan who had also played on Fish Rising, in Stewart's new band National Health at the beginning of 1976. After performing a few concerts and a BBC live session with them in February, he left to begin planning a solo career. A series of demos were recorded at The Chicken Loft in Witney, Oxfordshire, which were later released on the retrospective box set Searching for the Spark. Hillage, who greatly admired the work of musician and producer Todd Rundgren, sought out Rundgren's services to produce the new album. According to the guitarist, "I was fascinated by Todd Rundgren's work, as I saw him as an American musician who appeared quite similar and on the same wavelength as me." Following a letter from Hillage to Rundgren and a cordial phone conversation between the two, Hillage travelled to New York to meet and the agreement to work together flowed from that.

== Songs and recording ==
Sessions for the new album commenced at The Secret Sound, Woodstock, New York, produced and engineered by Todd Rundgren. Hillage and his girlfriend Miquette Giraudy (vocals, synths) were backed by members of Rundgren's band Utopia, including Roger Powell on keyboards, Kasim Sulton on bass and John Wilcox on drums. Several other musicians also guested including Don Cherry on trumpet and bells, Larry Karush on tabla and Sonja Malkine on a 15th century hurdy-gurdy.

Unusually for Hillage, half the songs on this album are covers. "Hurdy Gurdy Man" was written by Donovan, "Om Nama Shivaya" is based on a traditional Hindu mantra, and "It's All Too Much" was written by George Harrison, and originally appeared on the 1969 Beatles album, Yellow Submarine. Hillage chose the Donovan and Harrison songs because they were among his favorites, and also attempted a cover of The Byrds' "Eight Miles High" which was left unfinished and later appeared as a bonus track on reissues. The other three songs were penned by Hillage and Giraudy, with "Lunar Musick Suite" (under the working title "777 Glissando") and "Electrick Gypsies" having been performed when he toured with Gong in the latter half of 1975. "Lunar Musick Suite" was intended as a companion to "Solar Musick Suite" on Fish Rising, only its four sections were not titled. "Electrick Gypsies" had evolved from a riff during Hillage's days in Khan and had also been demoed for Fish Rising. Besides "Eight Miles High", other tracks recorded during the sessions (and included on later reissues) included an early version of "Palm Trees" titled "Maui", and the "It's All Too Much" B-side "Shimmer", originally composed with Gong synth player Tim Blake.

Hillage recollected this about the sessions:

When we began work on the second album, Todd Rundgren was very busy and was working on several other projects at that time. Although I had most of the material ready, the recording had to be done rapidly in a bit of a pressure cooker atmosphere. Despite that, Todd did some remarkable things on that album. At the last minute he changed the arrangements of several songs with very clever edits, and as someone who always thought he'd like to get into production eventually, it was a fantastic education watching him work and I felt very privileged to be able to do so.

== Album title and artwork ==
The title "L" has never been specifically explained by Hillage, although many fans interpret it as short for "love", reflecting the album's bright, optimistic tone. The cover features a clean-shaven Hillage (most of the publicity shots of Hillage during the 1970s show him with a full beard) holding his guitar, brightly backlit with a beatific look.

== Release and reception ==
Professional ratings
Review scores
Source	Rating
AllMusic	4/5 stars
Mojo	3/5 stars

L was released on September 24, 1976. The original Virgin catalogue number for this album on vinyl was V2066. An American pressing was issued on Atlantic Records, catalogue number SD 18205. The album entered the UK charts on 16 October 1976, where it stayed for 12 weeks, hitting a peak of number 10. This was the most successful of Steve Hillage's solo albums, the next most successful being the following Motivation Radio and Green, which reached numbers 28 and 30, respectively.

Critical reception to the album was largely positive. An ad placed in the October 23, 1976 issue of Melody Maker featured a compendium of positive quotes from the latest reviews. Mick Brown of Sounds enthused "Hillage and Rundgren have combined the exuberant and zestful experimentation of the psychedelic sixties, applied the expertise and accomplishment of the seventies and have come up with an album which I am convinced will sound as fresh and invigorating in the eighties." Angus MacKinnon of New Musical Express described Hillage's playing as "a joyful, reckless onrush of pearly scales all the way to journey's end" while Steve Lake of Melody Maker was quoted "Steve Hillage has it in him to become, conceivably, the most important improvising rock guitarist since Jimi Hendrix."

More recently, AllMusic opined "His awesome riffing and speedy solos on his Fender Strat rival those of Hendrix and Frank Marino but go further compositionally via exotic scales from other cultures. Add in Todd Rundgren's engineering and production genius, his Utopians guesting, and several others like Don Cherry on brass and Tibetan trumpet along with a 15th century Hurdy Gurdy and you have a wild romp into eclectic rock." Malcolm Dome of Classic Rock chose L as an essential Hillage release, commenting "overall there’s a joyous sense of freedom which comes from Hillage being allowed to indulge every aspect of his talent and musical spectrum."

In the Q & Mojo Classic Special Edition Pink Floyd & The Story of Prog Rock, the album came 28th in its list of "40 Cosmic Rock Albums".

== Track listing ==
Side one
No.	Title	Writer(s)	Length
1.	"Hurdy Gurdy Man"	Donovan	6:32
2.	"Hurdy Gurdy Glissando"	Miquette Giraudy, Steve Hillage	8:54
3.	"Electrick Gypsies"	Hillage	6:24

Side two
No.	Title	Writer(s)	Length
4.	"Om Nama Shivaya"	lyrics: Uma Nanda; music: Kesar Singh Narula	3:33
5.	"Lunar Musick Suite"	Giraudy, Hillage	11:59
6.	"It's All Too Much"	George Harrison	6:26

== Personnel ==
- Steve Hillage – guitar, vocals, EMS VCS 3, ARP Pro Soloist, shehnai
- Miquette Giraudy – lady voice, Isis vibes
- Roger Powell – RMI keyboard computer, piano, Moog synthesizer
- Kasim Sulton – bass guitar
- John Wilcox – drums
- Don Cherry – trumpet, voices, bells, tambura
- Larry Karush – tabla
- Sonja Malkine – 15th century hurdy-gurdy
