= Liz Van Dort =

Australian singer

Liz Van Dort (born in Melbourne, Victoria) is an Australian singer who appeared on the Resurgence (UK) and Prikosnovenie (France) labels, as well as recording with artists such as Daevid Allen and contributing her vocals to film and TV soundtracks.

Van Dort rose to prominence in the mid-1990s as part of ambient music duo Faraway, which she formed with her former partner, British musician Harry Williamson, son of acclaimed author Henry Williamson. Part of the explosion of world and experimental music popular in the 1990s, their unusual sound was likened to that of Dead Can Dance, Enigma and Deep Forest, and the duo were popular throughout Europe during this time.

Musician Peter Gabriel spoke highly of Van Dort's vocal prowess and she later worked in his Real World studios. Van Dort also sang on the 1995 re-release of 'Nuclear Waste' by Sting and the Radioactors. She later contributed tracks to a number of compilation albums and soundtracks, contributed vocals to film and TV soundtracks and in the mid 2000s released recordings under the name of Elvan.
