= Andy Anderson (drummer) =

British drummer (1951–2019)

- Born: Clifford Leon Anderson; 30 January 1951
- Origin: West Ham, Essex, England
- Died: 26 February 2019 (aged 68) Chelmsford, Essex, England
- Genres: Progressive rock; funk rock; space rock; gothic rock; post-punk; punk rock; alternative rock
- Occupation: Musician
- Instruments: Drums; percussion
- Years active: 1978–2019
- Formerly of: Steve Hillage; The Cure; The Glove; Jimmy Somerville; Jimmy Pursey; Isaac Hayes; Midge Ure; Iggy Pop; Hawkwind; The Last Poets; Jason Donovan; The Rock & Roll Gypsies; Peter Gabriel

Clifford Leon "Andy" Anderson (30 January 1951 – 26 February 2019) was a British drummer, best known for his work with the Cure and Steve Hillage, as well as a lengthy session career.

== Biography ==
Anderson was born to an Anglo-Caribbean family and was raised in London. His father was a part-time jazz drummer, and he first gained work as a drummer in recording sessions for television commercial jingles. He played live with a variety of space rock and progressive rock bands starting in the mid-1970s, and his first studio album appearance was on Xitintoday by Nik Turner's Sphynx in 1978 (under the name Android Anderson). That album was produced by Steve Hillage, who invited Anderson to perform on two of his own albums in 1979: Live Herald and Open. Anderson also worked as a session drummer for Mother Gong and Hawkwind.

In the early 1980s, Anderson expanded his palette by performing as a session and live drummer for a variety of new wave and alternative rock acts, such as M and Techno Twins. In 1983 he was recruited by Robert Smith and Steve Severin to play on the album Blue Sunshine by their side project The Glove. Smith's main band The Cure was in the midst of revamping its lineup, as incumbent drummer Lol Tolhurst had switched to keyboards. Smith invited Anderson to play on the Cure single "The Love Cats", after which he became a full-time member of the band. Anderson was the sole drummer on the 1984 album The Top.

While touring with the Cure in France in 1984, Anderson was accosted by a security guard in a racially motivated incident, and then destroyed a hotel room out of frustration. His behavior became increasingly erratic as the world tour progressed, culminating in an altercation with his bandmates and their road crew after a show in Japan. Anderson was fired from the Cure in October 1984.

Anderson then returned to session drumming and enjoyed a successful career as an in-demand collaborator for acts including Iggy Pop, Peter Gabriel, Edwyn Collins, Isaac Hayes, and Mike Oldfield. He also explored electronic music in a project called Prime Data, and another called Front and Centre. In 2012, he was briefly a member of The Cureheads, a tribute band to The Cure, and also made a guest appearance with Levinhurst, fronted by his former Cure bandmate Lol Tolhurst.

Anderson died from cancer at the age of 68 on 26 February 2019, after which he received many accolades from former bandmates and collaborators.

== Partial discography ==
Nik Turner's Sphynx

- Xitintoday (1978)

Steve Hillage

- Live Herald (1979)
- Open (1979)
- Green (2007 edition, appears on two bonus tracks)

The Glove

- Blue Sunshine (1983)

The Cure

- Japanese Whispers (1983)
- The Top (1984)
- Concert (1984)
- The Cure Live In Japan (1984) VHS
- Standing on a Beach (1986)
- Greatest Hits (2001)
