= Motivation Radio =

Studio album by Steve Hillage
- Released: September 1977
- Recorded: July 1977
- Studio: Record Plant, Los Angeles, California; Westlake Recording Studios, Los Angeles; T.O.N.T.O., Santa Monica
- Genre: Funk rock; psychedelic rock; dance-rock; art rock
- Length: 38:29
- Label: Virgin
- Producer: Malcolm Cecil

Steve Hillage chronology
L (1976)	Motivation Radio (1977)	Green (1978)

Motivation Radio is the third studio album by British progressive rock musician Steve Hillage, released by Virgin Records in September 1977.

Whilst touring in the United States in promotion of his previous album L (1976), Hillage grew disillusioned with the progressive rock tag attached to him by the media and fans, and disliked their attitude towards funk music, which Hillage was a big fan of. Hillage wanted to create a funk-influenced album as he was predominately listening to artists such as Funkadelic and Earth, Wind & Fire. Originally written as The Red Album in early 1977, it was retitled Motivation Radio prior to recording.

Hiring electronic innovator Malcolm Cecil, formerly of the pioneering Tonto's Expanding Head Band, to produce and engineer the album, Motivation Radio introduces Hillage's new rhythm section of drummer Joe Blocker and bassist Reggie McBride and was primarily recorded in Los Angeles, California in July 1977. The album presents a much more funk and dance-orientated sound than his previous albums, and relies more so on synthesizers, including T.O.N.T.O. (The Original New Timbral Orchestra), Cecil's large handbuilt polyphonic synthesizer, the first of its kind, that Cecil had played with the Expanding Head Band as he does here. Nonetheless, Hillage's glissando guitar remains at the centre of the album.

The album was released by Virgin Records in September 1977 and features a manipulated image of Hillage holding a Stratocaster in front of the Parkes Observatory on its album cover. Only entering the UK Albums Chart at number 28 and receiving little success in the United States, the album was not as much a commercial success as its predecessor, which Hillage believes was due to its funk influence. Nonetheless, it received praise from music critics and has continued to do so over time, and today is seen as a milestone in Hillage's career, establishing the electronic direction he later became known for. The album was remastered for CD on several occasions, most recently in March 2007 with the addition of bonus tracks.

== Background ==
Hillage's second album, the Todd Rundgren-produced L (1976), had proven to be his biggest commercial success to date, entering the UK Albums Chart on 16 October 1976, where it stayed for 12 weeks, hitting a peak of number 10. The success of L was largely due to the fact that Hillage had formed a band to promote the album in concert, extensively touring England and France for the remaining months of 1976. The concerts were well attended and well received, and news that L was also selling strongly in the United States led to Hillage and his band opening for Electric Light Orchestra on their 1977 tour of the United States. Hillage recalled that "the reaction we got was very encouraging and we went down well."

"After L, which did quite well in America and made us a bit of a name there, we got onto a big tour there supporting ELO, We were bracketed as “progressive rawk”. Well fair enough I suppose that’s what we were although we didn’t see ourselves like that – we thought of ourselves as psychedelic. At the time we were listening to a lot of funk, influenced by my friend Tony Andrews who was always into funk."

— Steve Hillage speaking to Terrascope

During his time in the United States, Hillage was seen by the media as "another" English progressive rock artist, much to Hillage's dislike. Hillage explained "I did have mixed feelings about the perception that surrounded my music," adding that "I must admit I never liked the term 'progressive rock'. I felt it never applied to Gong and it certainly never applied to me either. I felt that the music I was making was somehow out on its own, and although it had a quintessentially English feel and possibly it had a 'Canterbury sound' to it, I never considered my music or most of the so-called 'Canterbury' music for that matter 'progressive rock.'" Hillage felt he was far removed from the music of bands such as Yes and saw himself and his band as more like a psychedelic blues band with complex arrangements, with Hillage later saying that "we didn't have a label and I'm not into rigidly labeling music, and that was how [his songwriting partner and keyboardist Miquette Giraudy] and I felt."

Someone with eclectic musical tastes, Hillage had increasingly become a fan of funk bands such as Parliament and Funkadelic. During the American tour, fans would come back stage to meet the band and ask Hillage of his musical tastes, expecting him to list progressive rock artists, but Hillage would reply that he was "quite into" the new Earth, Wind & Fire album Spirit (1976) and his fans would react in horror, telling Hillage, as he recalled it, "What? You're into disco music?" Hillage recalled; "We had all these fans coming to us and saying 'aw Steve, I really love your work, and I really love Van der Graaf Generator and King Crimson and all your British rock, tell me what are you listening to at the moment.' I’d say 'well I’m really into Bootsy's Rubber String Band and P-Funk,' and they’d say 'what, you like disco?' It’s like I’d killed their pet cat."

The mislabelling of Hillage's music as progressive rock and his fans' attitude against funk and disco music would inspire him to change direction when preparing material for his next album. Hillage said his fans' "attitude annoyed me and I began to realise quickly that there was some sort of musical apartheid going on and it truly shocked me. I found myself wanting to do something more funky, partly to escape the 'progressive rock' tag." Speaking to Terrascope, he similarly recalled that "I got this feeling of musical apartheid over there, and I thought sod all that, and this sort of propelled me further down that road."

== Conceiving and production ==
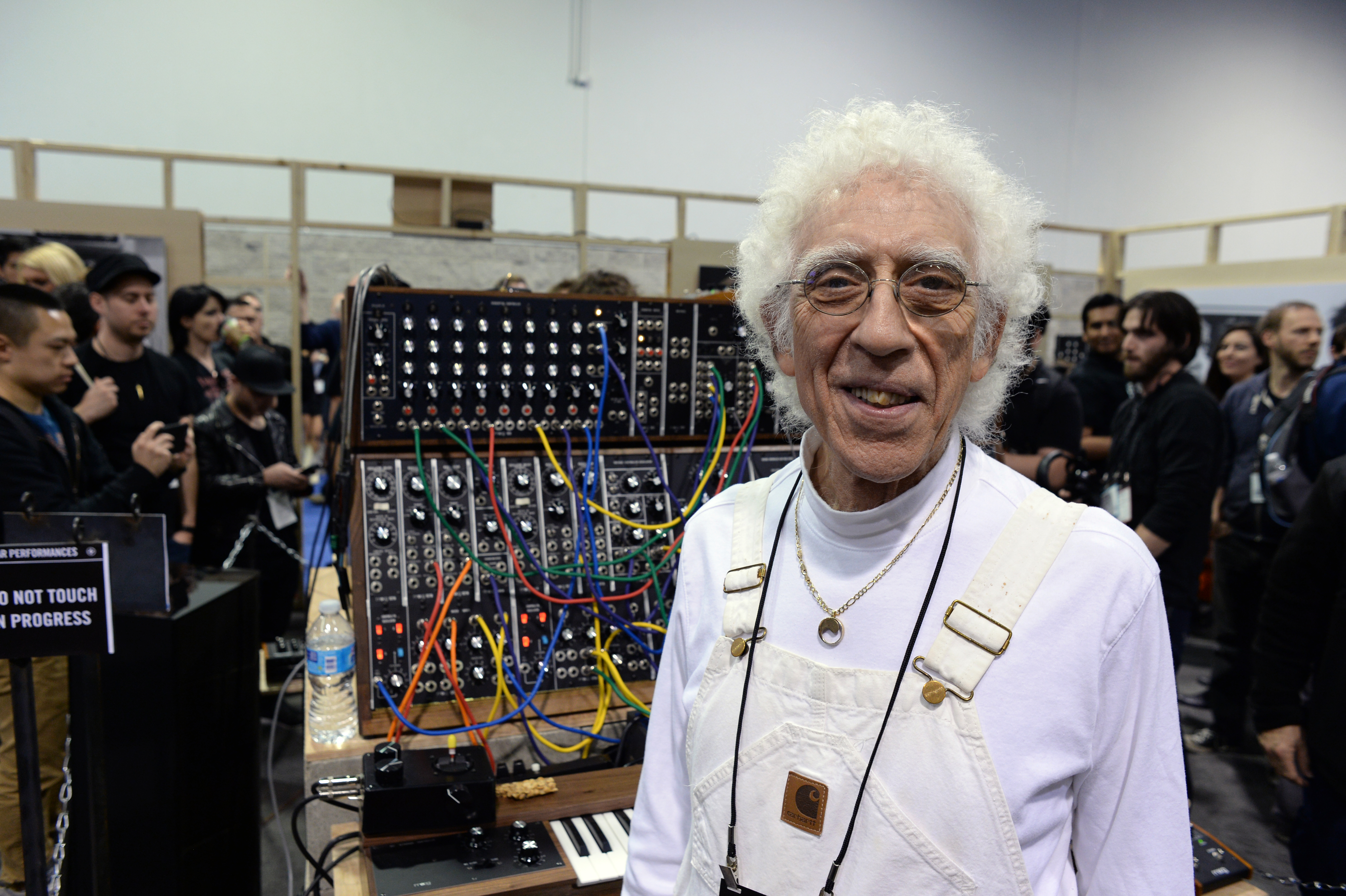
Malcolm Cecil (pictured in 2015) produced Motivation Radio.

Whilst based in Los Angeles, Hillage and Miquette met the influential synthesiser pioneer Malcolm Cecil, who had come to prominence in the early 1970s as half of the innovative Tonto's Expanding Head Band, recording the influential electronic album Zero Time (1971). He would then begin a successful career producing, engineering and programming, most notably with Stevie Wonder for four albums between 1972 and 1976. Hillage was a huge fan of Cecil and had listened to Tonto's second album It's About Time many times during the recording of L and was fascinated by the album and their work with Wonder. After telling a journalist in LA that he liked Cecil, Hillage was surprised to find the journalist knew Cecil and offered to arrange for them to meet. Cecil's electronic and dance textures were of interest to Hillage who was looking for a producer for his new album. Hillage recalled that "I thought that if I wanted to head into funkier territory then Malcolm was the man to help me achieve that on my next album."

Hillage and Giraudy wrote enough material for two albums during an "intense period" in spring 1977; Hillage recalled "when we were coming back from our first American tour we were on a creative high and a lot of music came out." Hillage's original idea was to release the material on two separate albums, The Red Album and The Green Album; however, the plan was abandoned and instead The Red Album was reworked to become Motivation Radio. Following a series of negotiations, Cecil agreed to produce and engineer Motivation Radio, and work began on the album in July 1977 in Los Angeles with a rhythm section consisting of drummer Joe Blocker and bass guitarist Reggie McBride. The album was recorded throughout July at Los Angeles' world-famous Record Plant studios, Westlake Audio studios (also in LA) and Cecil's own studio, T.O.N.T.O., in Santa Monica. Ron Alvarez worked on the album as an assistant engineer at Record Plant, whilst Dion Forrer was an assistant engineer for the sessions at T.O.N.T.O. The album was also mixed at Westlake Audio. The sessions at Westlake Audio were to record the glissando guitar, the hallmark of this album, intentionally on 7 July 1977 (7/7/77), to give the record mystical relevance.

Cecil's large handbuilt polyphonic synthesiser, TONTO, which stands for "The Original New Timbral Orchestra", was played by Cecil on the album, although "never in any great capacity." The first, and still the largest, multitimbral polyphonic analog synthesizer in the world, designed and constructed over several years by Cecil for usage in Tonto's Expanding Head Band, it started as a Moog modular synthesizer Series III owned by record producer Robert Margouleff, although by the time of the recording of Motivation Radio, a second Moog III was added, then four Oberheim SEMs, two ARP 2600s, modules from Serge with Moog-like panels, EMS, Roland, Yamaha, etc. plus several custom modules designed by Serge Tcherepnin and Cecil himself - who has an electrical engineering background. In their review of Motivation Radio, Real Gone Rocks said that although the instrument was a great leap forward for music, it was not especially practical, "since it was the size of a static caravan."

== Music ==
Presented as "a multidimensional window," music writer Mark Powell noted that, true to Hillage's wishes, Motivation Radio was "funkier in nature" than his previous material, although "still undeniably Hillage." Inspired by funk, disco and dance music, Motivation Radio sees Hillage extensively employing the synthesiser for the first time, as well as a guitar technique that gives much of the music here a mystical atmosphere. Hillage recalled that Motivation Radio was "the moment where the dance/funk thing began to manifest itself and even then that came out of an unusual and interesting experience." Although the album is more dance-orientated than previous works, it still features Hillage's trademark glissando guitar work at its core. Billboard said the album was "a further extension of [Hillage's] unique rock vision consisting of electronic galactic-seeming mind excursions filled with heavy synthesiser and a philosophy built around ancient Eastern culture," and noted that this fusing of disparate elements produces a "startling overall spacy sound." Although not a concept album, the album has been described as possessing a trademark sound that is carried throughout its nine tracks.

Dave Connolly of Allmusic characterised the album as the "light side of the moon," referring to Pink Floyd's The Dark Side of the Moon (1973), saying it draws the listener into its "own astral plane with a glossy and gauzy sound similar to Pink Floyd without the darkness, or Alan Parsons Project without the dorkiness." He said that Hillage's guitar work is "typically transcendent," Giraudy's keyboards "a vital component" and Joe Blocker's drums "a frequent breath of change." The new age/space ideology on the album has been said to be not far removed from Gong's "original alternate reality" which has been said to be "spelled out best during the album's true point of transmigration," "Saucer Surfing." Hillage said there was a definite Funkadelic influence on Motivation Radio and recalled that his excursions into funkier territory had begun with Gong, considering "Isle of Everywhere" from You (1974) to be a good example.

== Songs ==
"Hello Dawn" opens the album with heavily processed guitars, whilst both electronic and acoustic drums back Hillage's multi-tracked vocals as "he greets a new day with optimism." According to Real Gone Rocks, Hillage's multi-tracked guitars have "their signature sound" and they noted that during the vocal sections, they are used as "striking punctuation;" for example, during the brief instrumental break in the song's ending, "their chorus of sound dominates." With a track length of under three minutes, its brevity was a complete departure from the extended jams that dominated Hillage's previous work.

"Motivation" sees the band opt for a funk groove and features positive lyrics and, although dominated by Hillage's guitar work, Giraudy's keyboard fills are "supportive" whilst Blocker's drum patterns are "superb" and McBride's bass work shows "complexity without losing sight of his anchoring role."

The similarly groove-orientated "Light in the Sky" opens with a tight drum intro and is constructed around a "classic 70s riff". Its lyrics have been interpreted to be about how aliens can be viewed with suspicion, whilst Giraudy's heavily French accented vocal interludes give an "air of quirkiness".

The ethereal "Radio" has been compared to Hillage's work on L and carries a more spacious vibe, opening with a slightly jazzy guitar line, reprising the closing moments of "Light in the Sky" in the process; critics pointed out that the transition is unusual, as there is an obvious break in between the songs despite sounding like a segue was intended to merge the tracks. McBride's bass is high in the mix during the song whilst Blocker's drums are laid back and Giraudy's "blanket of keys" are "hovering somewhere in the back." Cecil performs a solo on his TONTO synthesiser during the song prior to the introduction of Hillage's vocals.

"Wait One Moment" is a ballad featuring soft vocals, "unassuming" bass runs and drum work compared to Nick Mason of Pink Floyd.

"Saucer Surfing" was described by Allmusic as the album's "true point of transmigration" and provides the album with its spikiest arrangement, possessing a sense of urgency.

"Searching for the Spark" features a then-futuristic base laid down by Giraudy and Cecil's synthesiser work, both of whom dominate the track with their synthesisers and TONTO. Blocker's drum work is aggressive in "an attempt to create a line between progressive rock and electronica."

The instrumental "Octave Doctors" is exemplary of Hillage's sweeping guitar solos, here featuring plenty of glissanto and vibrato, and carries a typical spaciousness.

The album closes with a cover of The Crickets' "Not Fade Away" featuring a loose groove with trippy keyboards and "some quirkier sounds" courtesy of Cecil.

== Release ==
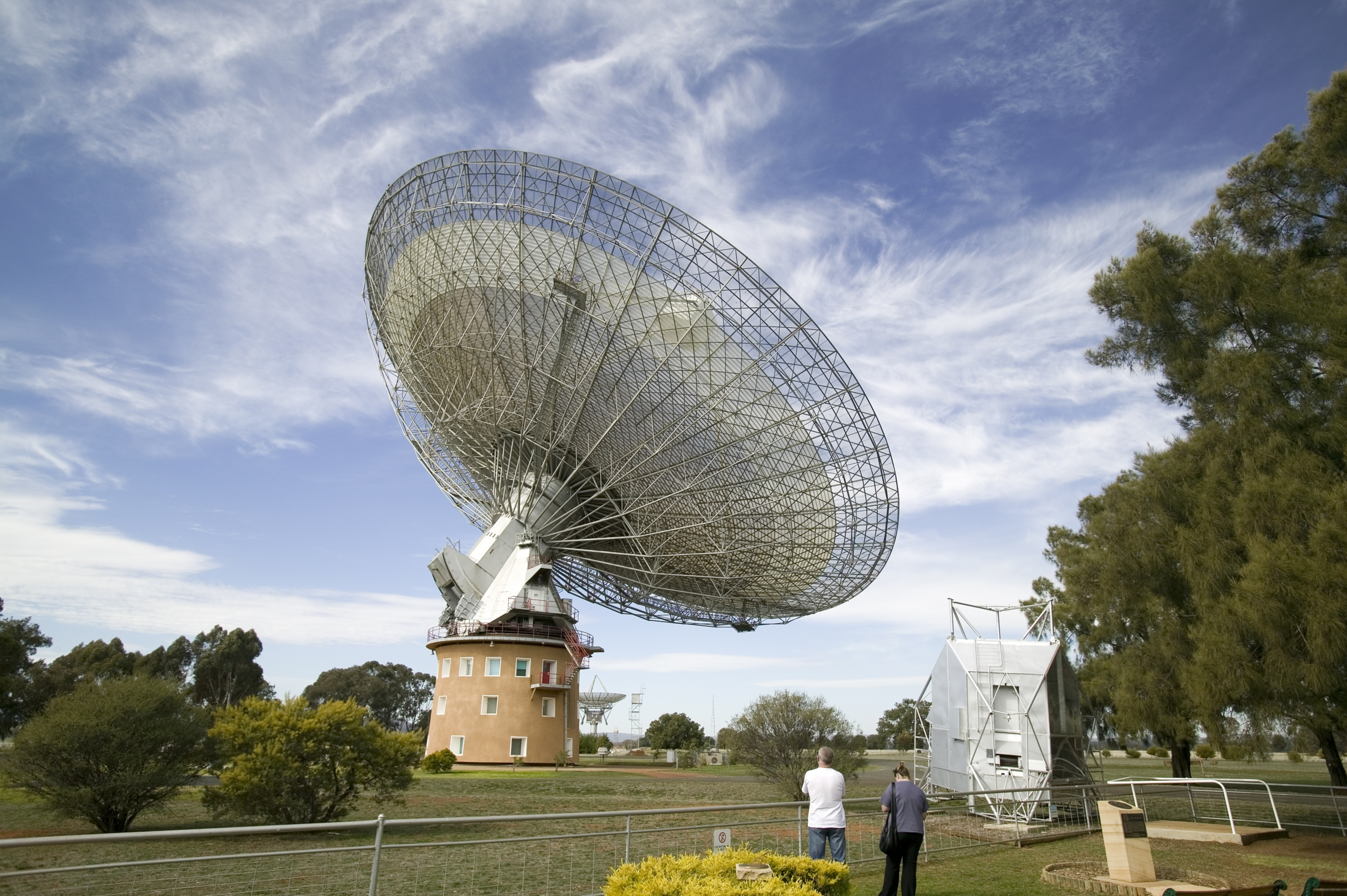
The Parkes Observatory radio telescope features on the cover.

The album's cover features Hillage standing on a shoreline holding a Stratocaster guitar, with the radio telescope at Parkes Observatory superimposed in the background. Hillage's father bought him the Stratocaster because Steve went to a public school - the City of London School - and "did quite well" on his O levels and won a scholarship, meaning that his father did not have to pay fees any more. Hillage recalled that "We found it through Exchange & Mart or Melody Maker - one or the other, I don't know." American art director Bob Cato is credited on the album sleeve for "design and photography."

Promoted with a magazine advertisement featuring the slogan "Get Motivated," Motivation Radio was released as an LP and cassette by Virgin Records in most regions in September 1977, with release in other countries such as Yugoslavia following in January 1978. The album entered the UK Albums Chart on 22 October 1977, where it stayed for 5 weeks, hitting a peak of number 28. This was significantly lower than L, which peaked at number 10. The album was also largely unsuccessful in the United States, although nonetheless, the album fared considerably better in Europe than his previous albums. Upon completing Motivation Radio, Hillage feared that he would not be as respected as before, but "wanted to go down that musical route anyway." In retrospect, he speculated that the Funkadelic influence lead to the relative commercial failure of the album in the United States, but noted that, in being one of Virgin's biggest acts, he was able to dictate his musical terms in some ways. Candy Absortian, writing in The Rough Guide to Rock, said the album was not going to win Hillage "many friends in the new punk order, and he was more or less the last remaining link with Virgin's hippie past, the label having by now signed the Sex Pistols." A music video was produced for "Radio", featuring a radio telescope similar to that on the cover.

"In some ways I was disappointed by America and the stereotyped attitudes to music were hard for me to accept. I found the headspace that existed in Europe much more conclusive when it came to experimentation. The idea of recording an album designed for mass American appeal didn't fill me with any enthusiasm at all."

— Steve Hillage on his reaction to how it was received.

"Not Fade Away (Glid Forever)" was released by Virgin Records as a seven-inch single in the United Kingdom and Germany in 1977, although it did not enter either country's national singles chart. Also in 1977, Virgin Records released the double Six-Pack : Six Track picture disc EP, which was limited to 5,000 copies and contains fifteen minutes of material, including "Not Fade Away" and "Radio". Motivation Radio has been remastered and re-released on CD by Virgin Records on several occasions; in 1987 with modified artwork, on 4 July 1990 in Japan only as the eleventh volume of Virgin Japan's British Rock History on CD re-issue series, and on 21 March 2007 with remastering by Pamela Byrne at The Audio Archiving Company, London, and the inclusion of three bonus tracks: the "Tonto Version" of "Leylines to Glassdom"–a song Hillage would re-record for his subsequent album Green, the original "Power Trio" backing track version of "The Salmon Song" and an alternate mix of "The Golden Vibe". The bonus tracks were selected by Hillage as "suitable" and "pertinent" and as fitting in with well with the concept of Motivation Radio.

== Critical reception ==
Professional ratings
Review scores
Source	Rating
AllMusic	4/5 stars
The Encyclopedia of Popular Music	3/5 stars

Despite the relative commercial failure of Motivation Radio, it received enthusiastic reviews from music critics, and, according to music writer Mark Powell, "did much to enhance Steve Hillage's reputation as an innovative musician." A magazine advertisement for the album noted that critics had called it "the best guitarist's album so far this year." Billboard were favourable, saying that "Hillage's powerful guitar powers its way through each cut as the synthesizer evokes the hypnotics" and singling out "Radio", "Motivation", "Searching for the Spark" and "Saucer Surfing" as the album's "best cuts." Phil Sutcliffe of Sounds magazine also wrote a review despite being heavily preoccupied with punk rock at the time.

In later times, the album has been increasingly acclaimed. Real Gone Rocks were very favourable, saying that, of all Hillage's albums, Motivation Radio "best represents Hillage as both a great musician and arranger." They said that the album "rarely meanders into self-indulgence, making it an unheralded classic among Hillage's recorded works." Dave Connolly of AllMusic said that "those in tune with being transported through music will want to station themselves near the speakers for Motivation Radio." He commented that "Motivation Radio works as well as it does because it draws listeners to that halfway point (and beyond), steering them with spiritual signposts and rewarding them with rapturous music. It's a remarkably smooth journey, more accessible than L, if equally cosmic. Again, it was an idiomatic cover tune, "Not Fade Away," that became the single; though an odd way to end the record, it wouldn't have made any sense in the middle. The rest of the record is a contiguous collection of music. So tune in and bliss out."

Connolly Co were very favourable and said "meditate, medicate, do whatever it takes, but tune into Motivation Radio. Presented as “a multidimensional window,” it’s a remarkable musical journey that fills the listener with positive energy. I know, that sounds sooo new agey, so let me explain. I don’t listen to this record, I lose myself in it. For forty minutes, my grey little world becomes a technicolor landscape where flying saucers and octave doctors come to life on crackling waves of energy. Still not helping? Okay, then think about Pink Floyd. Remember how Dark Side and Wish You Were Here transported you to another place? Well, Motivation Radio does the same, only it’s a much friendlier place. The sounds, the melodies, the musicality of it all conspires to make me drop my guard, and before I know it I’m no longer listening to the music, I’m breathing it. Maybe it’s just a harmonic thing, and you’re either tuned into this kind of music (in which case Gong’s You is probably one of your favorites) or you’re not."

== Aftermath and legacy ==
To coincide with the release of Motivation Radio, a new-line up of Steve Hillage's band featuring Blocker on drums, Curtis Robinson Jr on bass guitar and Chuck Bynum on keyboards and synths toured throughout the UK and Europe in late 1977, ending with a performance at The Rainbow in London on 3 November. The band were then due to tour America, but the tour was abandoned after the album's commercial failure, freeing the band to record again. For the subsequent album Green (1978), he recorded the material he had written alongside Motivation Radio in early 1977, originally intended to be released as The Green Album alongside The Red Album, before the latter album became Motivation Radio. Green builds upon the dance and electronic experiments of Motivation Radio.

The record has been credited as a major turning point for Hillage for both its experimentation and dance influence; Team Rock, who labeled Motivation Radio "Superior" in their "Buyer's Guide" for Hillage, noted that in some respects, the experimental nature of Motivation Radio presaged the music Hillage would create more than a decade later with his ambient project System 7, and commented that the way in which Hillage used synth sounds on "Light in the Sky" and "Radio" had "opened up [Hillage's] horizons to take in new influences." The Independent also credits the album with breaking Hillage's "hippy" image, noting that instead of taking a punk rock or post-punk influence to change his sound, he unexpectedly explored funk music:

It was the third Hillage album, Motivation Radio, in 1977, which suggested its author wasn't living in a hippie vacuum, oblivious to what was going on in the unvisioned world. Here were chunky, even funky riffs, and fewer fish. The "iconic hippie Aunt Sally who needed to be shoved in the stocks and have tomatoes thrown at him" (that's what he says. See, it's all coming out now!) wasn't listening to the Voidoids and Television, as one suspected, but to Bootsy Collins, Funkadelic, Parliament, Earth Wind & Fire and "The Commodores, before Lionel Richie went all schmaltzy". Hillage got the funk.

Robbie Rocks placed the album at number 6 in its list of the "Top 10 Albums of the Year [1977]." Music critic Charley Walters included the album in his list of the best albums of 1977, compiled for the 1977 edition of the annual Pazz & Jop critics poll of the best albums of the year included in The Village Voice. As with all editions of the Pazz & Jop, participating critics assigned a number value, ranging from five to thirty, to each of the albums on their top ten list, with all ten albums totaling one-hundred points, and Walters assigned eight points to Motivation Radio. An official promotional flyer created to promote a concert by experimental rock band Zag and the Coloured Beads in the 1980s was a pastiche of the Motivation Radio artwork.

== Track listing ==
Music by Steve Hillage; lyrics by Steve Hillage and Miquette Giraudy, unless otherwise specified.

Side one
No.	Title	Length
1.	"Hello Dawn"	2:48
2.	"Motivation"	4:07
3.	"Light in the Sky"	4:12
4.	"Radio"	6:13

Side two
No.	Title	Writer(s)	Length
5.	"Wait One Moment"		3:25
6.	"Saucer Surfing"		4:28
7.	"Searching for the Spark"		5:38
8.	"Octave Doctors"		3:38
9.	"Not Fade Away (Glid Forever)"	Norman Petty, Charles Hardin	4:00

== Personnel ==
- Steve Hillage – guitar, synthesizer, vocals
- Reggie McBride – bass
- Malcolm Cecil – synthesizer
- Miquette Giraudy – synthesizer
- Joe Blocker – drums
- Music composed and arranged by Steve Hillage except for Not Fade Away (Glid Forever) by Norman Petty and Glen Hardin.
- Recorded : July 1977 at Record Plant, T.O.N.T.O. and Westlake Audio in Los Angeles, CA.
- Produced by Malcolm Cecil
