= Fish Rising =

Studio album by Steve Hillage
- Released: 11 April 1975
- Recorded: September 1974 and January 1975
- Studio: The Manor (Shipton-on-Cherwell, England); The Manor Mobile
- Genre: Progressive rock, space rock
- Length: 44:59 (Original); 64:45 (Remaster)
- Label: Virgin
- Producer: Steve Hillage, Simon Heyworth

Steve Hillage chronology
Fish Rising (1975)	L (1976)

Fish Rising is the debut solo album by English progressive rock musician Steve Hillage, released by Virgin Records in April 1975. It was recorded just prior to Hillage's departure from the band Gong.

== Background ==
Steve Hillage had recorded the album Space Shanty with Khan in 1972, for which Hillage had composed all the songs. He was writing material for a second Khan album when the band split up. After joining Kevin Ayers' band for a few months, he was offered a position in Gong at the end of 1972. At this same time, the newly formed Virgin Records approached Hillage about recording a solo album for the label; however, he told them he wanted to see how he would fare in Gong, and that he would approach Virgin again when he felt ready to do a solo project. Hillage then went on to record the acclaimed Gong albums Flying Teapot, Angel's Egg and You for the Virgin label, which built the band a large cult following although none charted. After the completion of You, Hillage felt confident enough to re-approach Virgin about doing a solo album, to which they said yes.

== Compositions and recording ==
Two of the compositions for the album, "Solar Musick Suite" (with a different title and lyrics) and "Salmon Song", were among those considered back in 1972 for a second Khan release; both were in an incomplete state but now expanded and finished for the new solo project. "Aftaglid" was a newer composition written while a member of Gong and occasionally rehearsed with the band. In August 1974 rehearsals for the album began with Gong's bassist Mike Howlett and drummer Pierre Moerlen at Virgin's Manor Studio in Oxfordshire, where the three recorded stripped-down backing tracks of the songs. As Hillage explained, "Most of the music was played 'live' in the studio with very few overdubs, which made for a simple and quite raw sound. That wasn't the sound I was going for on the final album, as I wanted a richer, psychedelic sound which is what I eventually got, but because the original backing track mixes were quite different, they acquired an air of notoriety about them." In 2007, the CD re-release of Fish Rising would include the "power trio" backing version of "Aftaglid" as a bonus track.

Proper recording began in September 1974 at The Manor where You had been recorded that summer, using a band comprising all the members of Gong except Daevid Allen and Gilli Smyth: Mike Howlett, Pierre Moerlen, synthesizer player Tim Blake, saxophonist Didier Malherbe and keyboardist and vocalist Miquette Giraudy. Two guest musicians also appeared: bassoonist Lindsay Cooper of Henry Cow and Hillage's former Khan bandmate Dave Stewart, a keyboardist who was currently in Hatfield and the North. Stewart would contribute a fuzz organ solo to "Solar Musick Suite" and co-arrange the brief "Fish." Recording paused that fall as Gong began a mammoth tour for You (with an embryonic version of "Solar Musick Suite" now in the set list), then finished in January 1975 with the Manor Mobile before the group continued the tour.

== Release and reception ==
Professional ratings
Review scores
Source	Rating
Allmusic	4/5 stars
Uncut	4/5 stars

Fish Rising was released on April 11, 1975 on Virgin Records. It was a surprising success, peaking at number 33 on the UK charts, which was better than any Gong album. This success, compounded by Daevid Allen's abrupt departure from Gong on the day before the album's release, led to Virgin positioning Hillage as the new leader of the group. As this new lineup toured through the rest of 1975, the new solo album's "Solar Musick Suite", "Salmon Song" and "Aftaglid" all appeared in the set list. However, Hillage felt uncomfortable in the new role, stating "...the publication of articles in Melody Maker describing me as "the leader of Gong" made my then long hair stand on end! Eventually it felt inevitable that I too would have to leave the band." After playing his final shows with the band in December 1975 and contributing to two tracks on their ensuing album Shamal, he left to begin a proper solo career with no Gong-associated musicians outside of his girlfriend Miquette.

Upon release, a review in Disc gave a largely positive appraisal, opining "Hillage's guitar work is impressive and...produces some excellent passages of tight, funky blowing" yet also stated that some of the "cosmic stuff" and lyrics were tiring.

Retrospective reviews have been even more positive. Chris Nickson of AllMusic wrote "it is a very sophisticated record, with interesting arrangements and some innovative production -- a harbinger of Hillage's future career behind the boards. On the occasions he does unleash the fretwork, it's quite glorious". Simon Reynolds at Uncut raved "the guitarist’s flashy pyrotechnique is frequently a thing of sheer splendour", while Udiscover concluded it was "a far-reaching space-rock soundscape that set the scene for Steve’s huge solo success of the ensuing years, notably with the follow-up L."

In 2007, Virgin issued a re-mastered version with two bonus tracks. "Pentagrammaspin" was an outtake from the sessions that had originally appeared on the Virgin V sampler album in early 1975, while the "power trio" backing version of "Aftaglid" consisted only of Hillage, Howlett and Moerlen.

== Track listing ==
All music composed and arranged by Steve Hillage, lyrics by Hillage and Miquette Giraudy; "Fish" co-arranged by Dave Stewart

Side one – Inglid / Involution
No.	Title	Length
1.	"Solar Musick Suite" I. "Sun Song (I Love its Holy Mystery)" (6:15) II. "Canterbury Sunrise" (3:25) III. "Hiram Afterglid Meets the Dervish" (4:05) IV. "Sun Song (reprise)" (3:10)	16:55
2.	"Fish"	1:23
3.	"Meditation of the Snake"	3:10

Side two – Outglid / Evolution
No.	Title	Length
4.	"The Salmon Song" I. "Salmon Pool" (1:17) II. "Solomon's Atlantis Salmon" (2:08) III. "Swimming with the Salmon" (1:37) IV. "King of the Fishes" (3:43)	8:45
5.	"Aftaglid" I. "Sun Moon Surfing" (1:36) II. "The Great Wave and the Boat of Hermes" (1:51) III. "The Silver Ladder" (0:40) IV. "Astral Meadows" (2:01) V. "The Lafta Yoga Song" (2:42) VI. "Glidding" (2:23) VII. "The Golden Vibe/Outglid" (3:33)	14:46

Virgin 2007 re-master bonus tracks
No.	Title	Length
6.	"Pentagrammaspin" (2006 remix)	7:46
7.	"Aftaglid" (Original "Power Trio" backing track)	13:00

== Personnel ==
- Steve Hillage (listed as Steve Hillfish) – lead vocals, electric guitar, cover concept
- Miquette Giraudy (listed as Bambaloni Yoni) – background vocals, keyboards, synthesizers
- Mike Howlett – bass
- Pierre Moerlen – drums, marimba, darbuka
- Tim Blake (listed as Moonweed) – synthesizers, tamboura
- Didier Malherbe (listed as Bloomdido Glid de Breeze) – saxophone, Indian flute
- Lindsay Cooper – bassoon
- Dave Stewart – organ, piano

== Charts ==
Chart (1975)	Peak position
UK Albums (OCC)	33
