= Rainbow Dome Musick =

Studio album by Steve Hillage
- Released: 13 April 1979
- Recorded: January 1979
- Genre: Ambient music
- Length: 43:45
- Label: Virgin
- Producer: Steve Hillage and Miquette Giraudy

Steve Hillage chronology
Live Herald (1979)	Rainbow Dome Musick (1979)	Open (1979)

Rainbow Dome Musick is the fifth studio album by Steve Hillage, released by Virgin Records in April 1979. It is a departure from his previous albums, consisting of two long ambient songs recorded in collaboration with his long-time partner Miquette Giraudy.

== Background and recording ==
The album was commissioned for performance at the 1979 Mind-Body-Spirit Festival, held at Olympia London. It was recorded at Om in January 1979.

The equipment engineer was John Newsham. The Rainbow Dome concept was created by Rupert Atwill.

== Reception ==
Professional ratings
Review scores
Source	Rating
Allmusic	4/5 stars

In his book The Music's All that Matters: A History of Progressive Rock, Paul Stump commented that "it was perhaps Hillage's most spiritually saturated work, 1979's Rainbow Dome Musick, which ensured his place in rock history some ten years after the event. ... its celestial, looping synthesizers and glissando guitar provided as hypnotic and mesmerizing a multi-track experience as any heard in Progressive, or indeed in rock at that point." A retrospective review by Mike DeGagne in Allmusic asserted that the album puts Hillage's varied musical background to strong use in both of the pieces, creating "a relaxing and pleasantly divergent journey through a sorted spectrum of instruments".

It was ranked as one of the 1,000 greatest albums of all time by The Guardian.

== Track listing ==
No.	Title	Music	Producer(s)	Length
1.	"Garden of Paradise"	M. Giraudy	M. Giraudy, S. Hillage	23:15
2.	"Four Ever Rainbow"	S. Hillage	S. Hillage	20:30

== Personnel ==
- Steve Hillage – lead guitar, electric guitar, glissando guitar, Fender Rhodes, ARP synthesizer, Moog synthesizer
- Miquette Giraudy – double sequencer, Fender Rhodes, ARP Omni, Tibetan bells
- Rupert Atwill – Eventide Harmoniser
