= Miquette Giraudy =

French keyboard player and vocalist

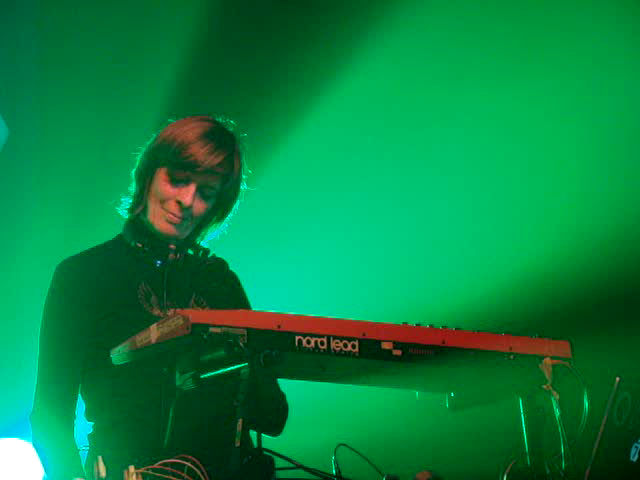
- Giraudy playing keyboards in London at the nightclub "Heaven" in February, 2008

Background information
- Also known as: Bambaloni Yoni, Marsiale Giraudy, Monique Giraudy
- Born: February 9, 1953 (age 73); Nice, France
- Genres: Psychedelic rock, space rock, ambient, techno
- Occupations: Musician, writer, actress
- Instruments: Vocals, Keyboards, percussion

Miquette Giraudy (born 9 February 1953) is a French keyboard player and vocalist, best known for her work in Gong, and with her partner Steve Hillage. She and Hillage form the core of the ambient band System 7. She has also worked as an actress, film editor and writer, in each role using different stage names.

== Early life ==
Miquette Giraudy was born on 9 February 1953, in Nice, France.

== Film ==
In the late 1960s Giraudy, under the name Monique Giraudy, became assistant to French film maker Jackie Raynal. She has script and assistant editing credits on the 1969 Barbet Schroeder film More. In front of the camera she appeared, under the name Marsiale Giraudy, in Jean-Pierre Prévost's 1971 film Jupiter, and, as Monique Giraudy, played the role of Monique in Schroeder's 1972 film La Vallée. Raynal herself appeared in Martial Raysse's 1972 film, Le grand départ and Monique Giraudy gets a full editing credit.

== Gong ==
Already Hillage's girlfriend, Giraudy joined him in Gong as a vocalist in March 1974, replacing Diane Stewart-Bond, who had replaced Gilli Smyth the previous year. Smyth returned to Gong for part of 1974, with Giraudy coming back to the band in July. Hillage and Giraudy left the band together at the end of 1975.

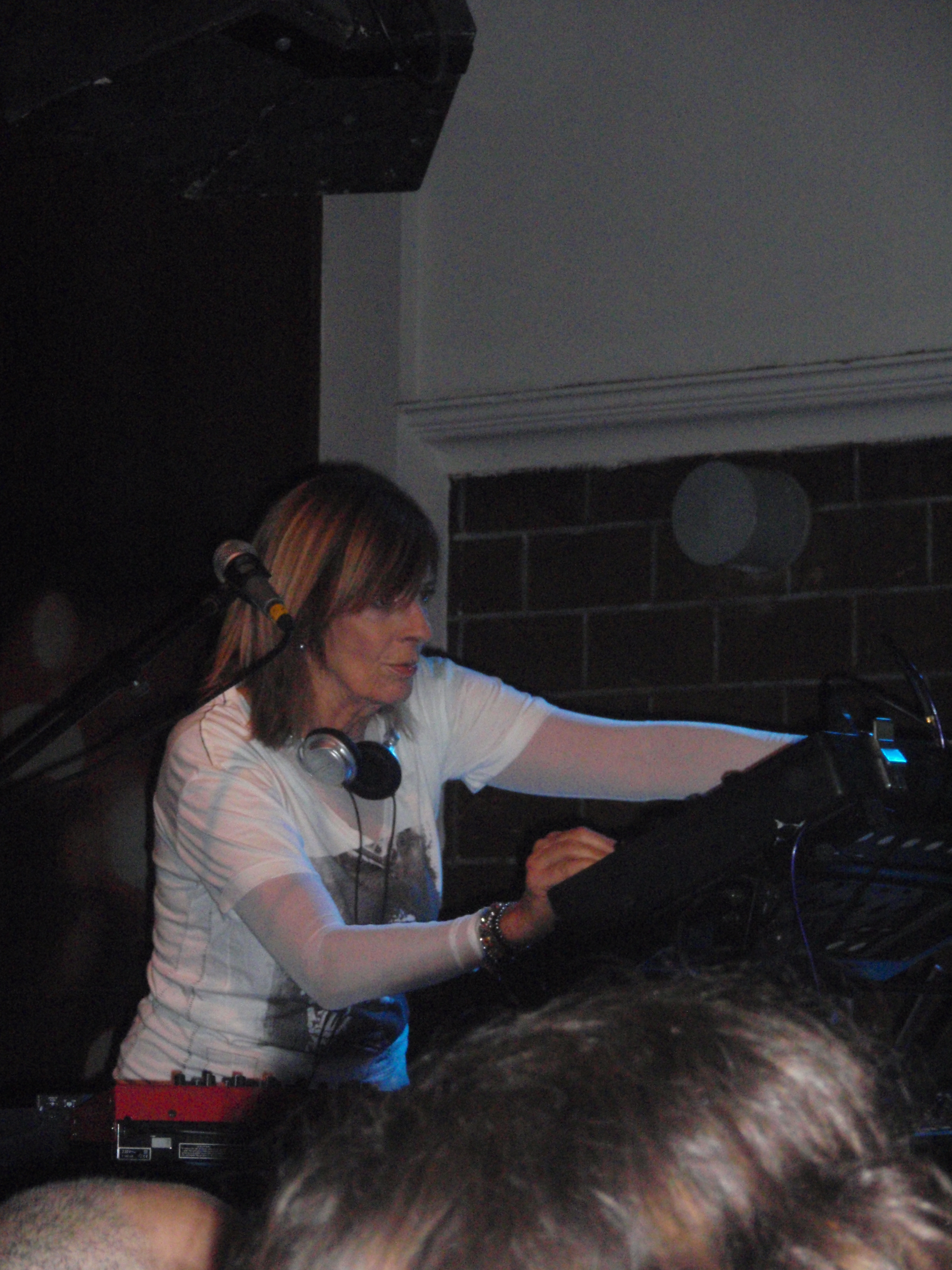
Giraudy playing with Gong in Tel Aviv in 2009

Giraudy appears on the 1974 album You as "Bambaloni Yoni" (Wee voices and Chourousings (sic)), on one track of the studio album Shamal (1975) and four tracks of Gong Live Etc. (1977). She is also on the archival release, Live at Sherwood Forest 75 (2005).

Giraudy, together with Steve Hillage, reunited with Gong for various shows from 2006 onwards and the same line-up released a new album, 2032, in 2009.

== Hillage solo albums ==
Giraudy appears on all of Hillage's solo albums. She played percussion, keyboards, sang and co-wrote material on Fish Rising (1975), L (1976), Motivation Radio and several subsequent albums.

Although released under Hillage's name, Rainbow Dome Musick (1979), a seminal early ambient album, consisted of two sides, side A written and largely performed by Giraudy and side B written and largely performed by Hillage.

== System 7 ==
More recently, Hillage and Giraudy formed System 7, working with a number of collaborators.

== Recordings ==
1974 to 1977 she recorded as part of Gong (on Virgin Records), and 1975 to 1983 she recorded with Hillage (on Virgin and on GAS Records [Gong Appreciation Society]). 1990 to the present Giraudy has been recording as part of System 7 (on 10 Records, Butterfly Records and Wakyo Records).
