= Unwin =

Unwin may refer to:

== People ==
=== Given name ===
- Unwin Brown, British drummer with the Trees

=== Surname ===
- Alan Unwin, Canadian politician
- Antony Unwin (b. 1952), statistician and software developer
- Ben Unwin (1977–2019), Australian actor
- Edward Unwin (1864–1950), recipient of the Victoria Cross
- Esmond Unwin Butler (1922–1989), Canadian diplomat
- George Unwin (1913–2006), RAF wing commander
- Howard Unwin Moffat (1869–1951), Rhodesian premier
- J. D. Unwin (1895–1936), British ethnologist
- Jim Unwin (1912–2003), English rugby union international
- Joseph Unwin (1892–1987), Canadian politician
- Nora S. Unwin (1907–1982), children's illustrator
- Paul Unwin (cricketer) (b. 1967), New Zealand cricketer
- Paul Unwin (film director) (b. 1957), UK-based film and television director
- Raymond Unwin (1863–1940), English planner
- Rayner Unwin (1925–2000), son of publisher, Stanley Unwin
- Robert Unwin Harwood (1798–1863), Canadian businessman and political figure
- Stanley Unwin (comedian) (1911–2002), South African born comedian
- Sir Stanley Unwin (publisher) (1884–1968), nephew of Thomas Fisher Unwin
- Stephen Unwin (b. 1959), English theatre director
- Thomas Fisher Unwin (1848–1935), founder of publisher T. Fisher Unwin
- William Unwin (1838–1933), mechanical engineer
- William Sully Unwin (born 1862), English clergyman and amateur rower

== Fiction ==
- Characters from the British TV soap opera Coronation Street
  - Bev Unwin
  - Shelley Unwin
- Gary "Eggsy" Unwin, a fictional character and protagonist from the Kingsman film franchise
- The surname “Unwin” is mentioned in reference to an alphabetical roster of orphans’ names in Charles Dickens’ novel, “Oliver Twist”.

== Other ==
- Allen & Unwin, publishing house
- T. Fisher Unwin, publishing house
- Unwins, a chain of off-licenses
- Unwin Sowter (1839 - 1910), English cricketer
