= I Am Lazarus =

1945 short story collection by Anna Kavan

- Author: Anna Kavan
- Language: English
- Genre: Short story collection
- Publisher: Jonathan Cape
- Publication date: 1945
- Publication place: United Kingdom
- Media type: Print (hardback)
- Pages: 146
- Preceded by: Change the Name
- Followed by: Sleep Has His House

I Am Lazarus is a collection of fifteen short stories by the British writer Anna Kavan, first published in London by Jonathan Cape in 1945. It was Kavan's third book under the name "Anna Kavan" and her second short-story collection, following Asylum Piece (1940) and the novel Change the Name (1941).

The book draws on Kavan's wartime work at the Mill Hill Emergency Hospital––the wartime evacuation site of the Maudsley Hospital in north London––where she was employed from 1943 interviewing soldiers diagnosed with effort syndrome, the contemporary term for somaticised war neurosis. The title alludes to the biblical figure of Lazarus raised from the dead, used by Kavan as a metaphor for psychiatric patients revived from catatonic states by insulin shock therapy and prolonged narcosis but who remain "spiritually deadened", and for traumatised soldiers whose experiences remain "inarticulate and incommunicable".

== Background ==
Kavan returned to England in early 1943 after being unable to obtain a visa for South Africa. She was treated at the Tavistock Clinic and then took war work at Mill Hill, where she conducted intake interviews with soldiers under the broader Maudsley team led by Aubrey Lewis and Walter Maclay; she also studied for the Diploma in Psychological Medicine and worked as a secretary at Horizon. Her own history of severe depression and treatment for heroin addiction in a Swiss clinic in 1938, together with the death of her son Bryan Ferguson in action in 1943, informs the collection's pacifist and asylum-set stories.

== Contents ==
The collection comprises fifteen stories:

1. "I Am Lazarus"
2. "Palace of Sleep"
3. "Who Has Desired the Sea"
4. "The Blackout"
5. "Glorious Boys"
6. "Face of My People"
7. "The Heavenly Adversary"
8. "The Brother"
9. "The Gannets"
10. "The Picture"
11. "All Kinds of Grief Shall Arrive"
12. "A Certain Experience"
13. "Benjo"
14. "Now I Know Where My Place Is"
15. "Our City"

The title story and "Face of My People" had previously appeared in Horizon.

== Themes ==
The stories are concerned with war trauma, psychiatric incarceration, somatic treatments such as insulin-shock therapy and prolonged narcosis, the Blitz, pacifism, and the dream-like or Kafkaesque bureaucratic persecution of civilians and patients. In her 2017 article on the collection, the Kavan scholar Victoria Walker argues that the book examines the intersection of psychological trauma and the physiological symptoms characteristic of effort syndrome, and that in its Blitz stories "everyday objects become animated and hostile towards [Kavan's] protagonists".

== Reception ==
Reviewing the collection on its publication, Desmond MacCarthy called Kavan "an artist of great distinction", and John Betjeman, writing in the Daily Herald, praised the "narrative power" of the stories. The book went out of print after 1945 and remained scarce until Peter Owen Publishers reissued it in 1978, and again in 2013 as a Peter Owen Modern Classic with a new foreword by Walker, who chairs the Anna Kavan Society.

Stories from the collection have been anthologised since first publication: "I Am Lazarus" appeared in Stories of the Forties (1945) and in Mary Louise Aswell's The World Within: Fiction Illuminating Neuroses of Our Time (1947), and "Face of My People" in Little Reviews Anthology 1945 and Modern British Writing (1947). A selection drawn from the volume was included in Machines in the Head: The Selected Short Writing of Anna Kavan, edited by Walker (Peter Owen, 2019; New York Review Books, 2020).

== Editions ==
- Anna Kavan, I Am Lazarus: Short Stories (London: Jonathan Cape, 1945), 146 pp.
- Anna Kavan, I Am Lazarus (London: Peter Owen, 1978), ISBN 0-7206-0520-2.
- Anna Kavan, I Am Lazarus, foreword by Victoria Walker, Peter Owen Modern Classics (London: Peter Owen, 2013), ISBN 978-0-7206-1493-0.
