= Peter Owen =

Peter Owen may refer to:

- Peter Owen (make-up artist), Oscar-winning make-up artist
- Peter Owen (publisher) (1927–2016), British publisher
- Peter Owen Publishers, a London-based publisher founded in 1951
- Peter Owen (actor) in Miss Mabel
- Peter Owen (racer) in 2000 Sports Racing World Cup season
- Peter Francis Owen, honoured in 1990 New Year Honours

== See also ==
- Peter Owen-Jones (born 1957), English clergyman, author and TV presenter
