= The Lagoon =

1897 short story by Joseph Conrad

- Short story by Joseph Conrad
- Country: England
- Language: English
- Genre: Short story

Publication
- Published in: The Cornhill Magazine
- Publication type: Magazine
- Publication date: January 1897

"The Lagoon" is a short story by Joseph Conrad composed in 1896 and first published in The Cornhill Magazine in January 1897. The work was collected in Conrad’s first volume of short stories Tales of Unrest (1898).

One of Conrad’s “Malayan tales”, “The Lagoon”, at 5,500 words, is Conrad’s shortest work of fiction. Frequently anthologized, Conrad reported that it was his favorite story.

== Plot ==
A white man, addressed as "Tuan" (the equivalent of "Lord" or "Sir") arrives by canoe at the remote jungle dwelling of the Malayan Arsat. The two men were formerly involved in some regional intrigues. The white man finds that Arsat’s wife, Diamelen, is dying from a mysterious illness. Arsat begins to tell a story, starting with the time when he and his brother kidnapped Diamelen (who was previously a servant of the rajah's wife). They all fled in a boat at night and traveled until they were exhausted. Soon, they discover they are being pursued by the rajah's men. Arsat's brother told Diamelen and Arsat to flee to the other side, where there was a fisherman's hut. He instructed them to take the fisherman's boat and then stayed back, telling them to wait for him, while he tried to hold the pursuers off with his rifle. Arsat then starts pushing the canoe from shore, leaving his brother behind. He then sees his brother running down the path, being chased by the pursuers. Arsat's brother tripped and the enemy was upon him. His brother got up, then called out to him three times, but Arsat never looked back. The pursuers killed his brother and Arsat had betrayed his brother for the woman he loved, who was now dying.

Towards the end of the story, symbolically, the sun rises and Diamelen dies. With Diamelen's death, Arsat has nothing because he lost his brother and wife. After Diamelen's death, he tells Tuan he plans to return to his home village to avenge his brother's death.

== Analysis ==
The story is full of symbols and contrasts - such as the use of dark/light, black/white, sunrise/sunset, water/fire, and movement/stillness. Arsat's clearing is still, nothing moves, yet everything outside the clearing moves. Earlier in the story, his brother tells Arsat that he is only half of a man, for Diamelen has his heart and he is not whole. With Diamelen's death, Arsat becomes a whole man again. At the end of the story, motion finally enters Arsat's clearing. The movement signifies his leaving of "a world of illusion" and the fact that Arsat is finally a "free man". In the story, darkness represents ignorance and denial, whereas light represents enlightenment and the fact that Arsat is finally a free man.

== Theme ==
The story is a tale of “impulsive betrayal and permanent remorse” in which an “act of redemption” will likely result in the protagonist’s death . Critic Laurence Graver remarks of Arsat’s tragic fate:

By failing to understand the moral implications of his fatal choice, and by thinking that a simple act of revenge will provide final retribution, Arsat remains a permanent victim of his inadequate dreams.

Arsat’s appeal to the white narrator of the story, who appears to “embody a moral position” is in fact merely an observer and can offer no insights into the Malay’s moral crisis. Literary critic Edward W. Said comments of the Arsat’s doomed search for guidance to resolve his dilemma:

As Arsat closes his story, he asks the white man for advice and explanation…the white man answers with frightening passivity: “There is nothing.” Arsat returns to his obscure quest for self-rectitude in an existence the white man cannot possibly understand: The placid lagoon…represents an eternity of uncomprehending distance between the two men.

== Max Beerbohm parody ==
English caricaturist Max Beerbohm included Conrad among the seventeen authors he parodied in his 1912 A Christmas Garland.

Beerbohm, in targeting “literary falseness” singled out two of Conrad’s Malay tales, “Karain” and “The Lagoon” for the “adjectival excesses” of their styles.

“The Lagoon” in particular, according to literary critic Alfred J. Guerard “may well have deserved Max Beerbohm’s amusing parody…And yet it has the very originality and personal accent that provokes parody. It is indeed an eccentric dream…” The “incoherency” of the story, which combines the elements of a “symbolism prose-poem, a story of crime and punishment, and an exotic local-color story” was bound to provoke a burlesque: “The obvious idiosyncrasy is the one of which Beerbohm made such capital.”

== Sources ==
- Baines, Jocelyn. 1960. Joseph Conrad: A Critical Biography, McGraw-Hill Book Company, New York. ISBN 978-0297167556
- Gopnik, Adam. 2015. The Comparable Max. The New Yorker, August 3, 2015. https://www.newyorker.com/magazine/2015/08/03/the-comparable-max Retrieved 30 January 2023.
- Graver, Laurence. 1969. Conrad’s Short Fiction. University of California Press, Berkeley, California. ISBN 0-520-00513-9
- Guerard, Albert J. 1965. Conrad: The Novelist. Press, Cambridge, Massachusetts. LOC Catalog Card Number 58-8995.ISBN 978-0674163508
- Watt, Ian. 1977. Impressionism and Symbolism in Heart of Darkness. The Southern Review, January 1977 in Joseph Conrad: Modern Critical Reviews, editor Harold Bloom. Chelsea House Publishers. 1987 pp. 83–99 ISBN 0-87754-642-8
