= An Outpost of Progress =

1897 short story by Joseph Conrad

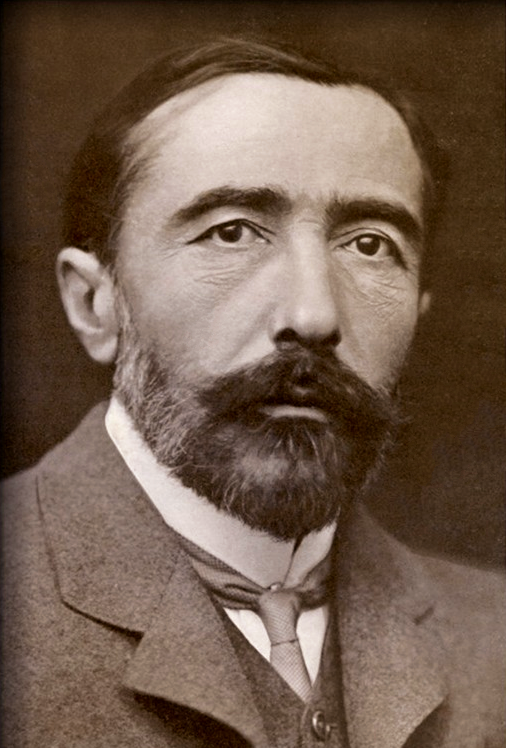
Joseph Conrad

"An Outpost of Progress" is a short story written in July 1896 by Joseph Conrad, drawing on his experiences in the Belgian Congo. It was published in 1897 in the magazine Cosmopolis and in 1898 was collected in Tales of Unrest.

== Plot ==
The story deals with two European men, named Kayerts and Carlier, who are assigned to a trading post in a remote part of the African jungle. There they take part in ivory trading, seeking financial benefit both for the company and for themselves. With no specific tasks or important things to be done, they both become increasingly isolated and demoralized as time goes by. At one point in the story, the native Makola, serving as Kayerts and Carlier's bookkeeper, initiates an exchange of slaves for ivory. Initially Kayerts and Carlier are stunned and scandalized by the idea, yet eventually they accept the deal and aid Makola for his huge profit. Both men are plagued by disease and grow very weak physically toward the end of the story. Finally, a seemingly trivial matter—sugar—sparks an irrational, uncontrolled, and violent conflict between them, which ends tragically as Kayerts accidentally shoots and kills Carlier. At the end of the story, just when the company steamboat approaches the station two months later than it should have, Kayerts hangs himself out of desperation.

== Background ==
Conrad, who favored the journal Cosmopolis to publish his early work, came into conflict with the editors over what they considered the excessive length of “An Outpost of Progress.” Conrad wrote a confidant on the matter:

It is too long for one number they say. I told the unspeakable idiots that the thing halved would be as useless as a dead scorpion. There will a part without a sting - and the part with the sting - and being separated they will be both harmless and disgusting.

Conrad was placated when he discovered that Cosmopolis was providing a generous fee for the story: £50.

== Literary influences ==
Conrad served his “apprenticeship” under the influence of the French author Gustave Flaubert and British author Rudyard Kipling.

The two ivory dealers portrayed in “The Outpost of Progress” closely resemble the chief protagonists in Flaubert’s novel Bouvard et Pécuchet (1881), “as classic revelation of bourgeois stupidity and pretension.” Literary critic Laurence Graver writes:

In fact, one episode in “An Outpost of Progress" parallels a fine scene in Flaubert’s novel. Once settled in their posts, Kayerts and Carlier find novels left by their predecessors: ‘in the center of Africa they made the acquaintance of Cardinal Richelieu and D’Artagnan, of Hawk’s Eye and Father Goriot...they discounted their virtues, suspected their motives, decried their successes; were scandalized at their duplicity or were doubtful about their courage.’ Similarly, Bourard and Pecuchet mention Richelieu and read Dumas and Balzac in an uncomprehending way.”

Graver also reports that “An Outpost of Progress” is highly derivative of the works of Rudyard Kipling, in particular his “The Man Who Would Be King” (1888).” Conrad’s irony is conveyed through “a playful mixture of the jaunty and macabre”, an unmistakable feature of Kipling’s fiction. Graver observes that “Conrad keeps falling back on humor typical of Kipling, particularly euphemized substitution to mask the ugly facts of life.”

== Theme ==
Conrad described “An Outpost of Progress” as “the lightest part of the [literary] loot that I carried off from Central Africa.”

Biographer Joycelyn Baines comments on Conrad’s sojourn in the Belgian Congo during the early 1890s and the misanthropic elements evident in his literature.:

"An Outpost of Progress”, for all its irony and macabre humor, and “Heart of Darkness” (1899), with its tone of outraged humanism and its consciousness of evil, show how deeply he was affected emotionally by the sight of such human baseness and degradation; moreover, his Congo experience devastatingly exposed the cleavage between human pretensions and practice, a consciousness of which underlies Conrad’s philosophy of life.

Literary critic Albert J. Guerard notes that “An Outpost of Progress” is of interest chiefly as “a cold adumbration…offering a significant variant on “Heart of Darkness” and the only stories Conrad based on his experiences in Central Africa. Guerard writes:

“An Outpost of Progress” is carefully, ploddingly, plausibly constructed to throw a full expository light on its theme…There are no signs of subjective involvement... the story comes to us in plain, efficient, unevocative prose.”

As such, “the most personal voice of the early Conrad is lacking.” The work is “perfectly devoid of familiarity between author and reader…”

Literary critic Edward W. Said locates the theme of “An Outpost of Progress” in the shame Conrad felt at “allowing [his] personal ideals to be corrupted” and in particular, “the shame of fear.” Said declares that Conrad experienced a sense of guilt at his renunciation of the “ideals of his Polish heritage” and “the capricious abandonment” of his life as a mariner. Said writes:

Conrad had become, like Kayerts and Carlier, a creature of civilization, living in reliance upon the safety of his surroundings…When the story, he found, like the two unfortunate disciples of progress…he had laid himself open to a terrifying invasion of the unknown…When the two Europeans kill each other for a lump of sugar, their degradation is complete. The fraudulent machinery of social camouflage in which they had placed their unexamined faith has destroyed them.

== Sources ==
- Baines, Jocelyn. 1960. Joseph Conrad: A Critical Biography, McGraw-Hill Book Company, New York. ISBN 978-0297167556
- Peters, John G. (14 September 2006). The Cambridge Introduction to Joseph Conrad (1st ed.). Cambridge University Press. ISBN 9780521548670.*Graver, Laurence. 1969. Conrad’s Short Fiction. University of California Press, Berkeley, California. ISBN 0-520-00513-9
- Guerard, Albert J. 1965. Conrad: The Novelist. Harvard University Press, Cambridge, Massachusetts. LOC Catalog Card Number 58-8995. ISBN 978-0674163508
- Said, Edward W. 1966. The Past and Present: Conrad’s Shorter Fiction, from Said’s Joseph Conrad and the Fiction of Autobiography.Harvard University Press, in Joseph Conrad: Modern Critical Reviews, Harold Bloom editor. Chelsea House Publishers. 1987 pp. 29–51 ISBN 0-87754-642-8
