= Anna Kavan =

British novelist, short story writer and painter

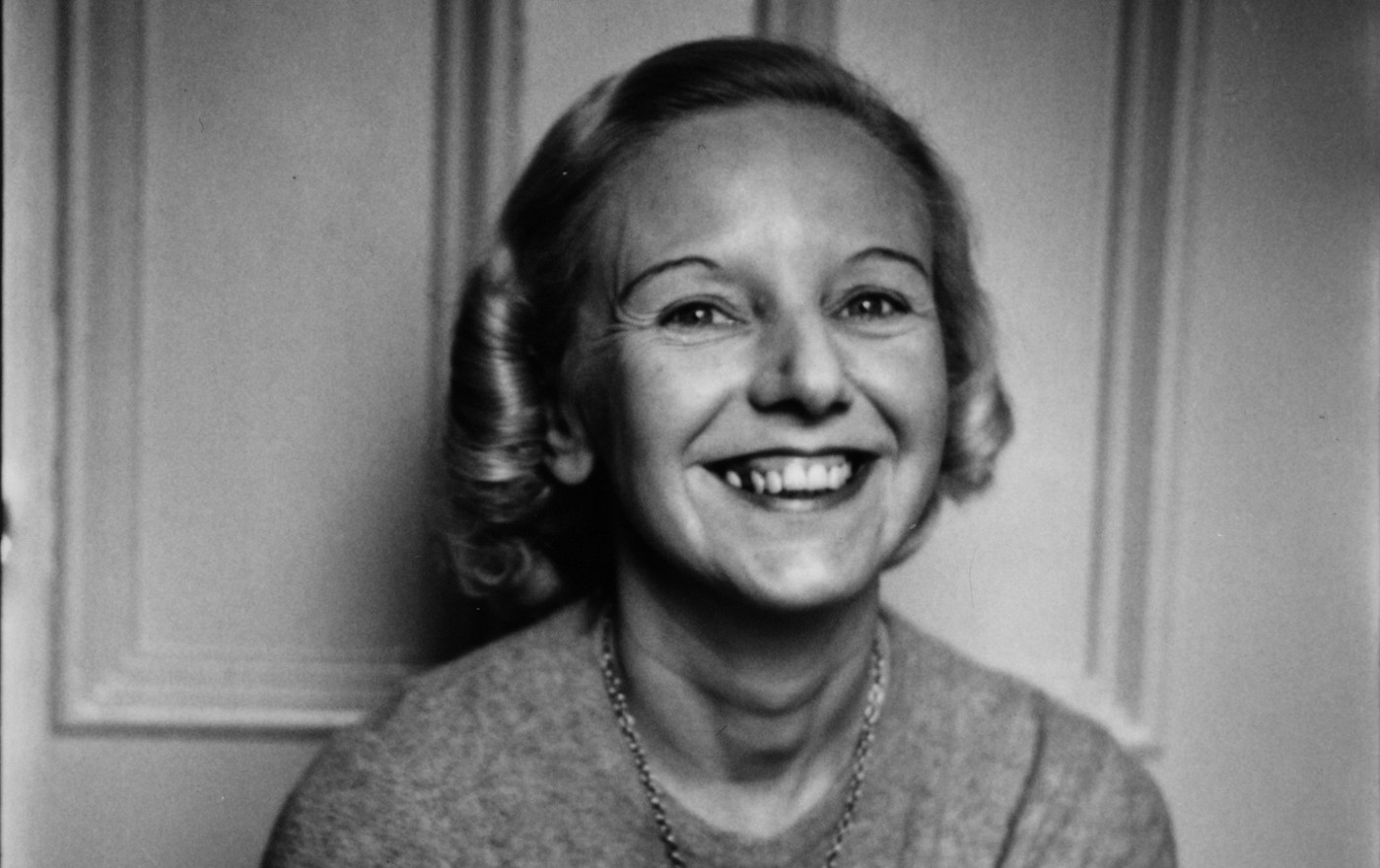
- Portrait from the 1950s
- Born: Helen Emily Woods; 10 April 1901; Cannes, France
- Died: 5 December 1968 (aged 67); London, England
- Occupations: Novelist; short story writer; painter
- Spouses: Donald Ferguson (m. 1919; div. 1928); Stuart Edmonds (m. 1931; div. 1938)
- Children: 2
- Writing career
- Pen name: Anna Kavan; Helen Ferguson
- Notable work: Ice

Anna Kavan (born Helen Emily Woods; 10 April 1901 – 5 December 1968) was a British novelist, short story writer and painter. Originally publishing under her first married name, Helen Ferguson, she adopted the name Anna Kavan in 1939 as both her pen name and her legal identity. She is most well-known for her 1967 novel, Ice, published just a year before her death.

== Biography ==
=== Early life and background ===
Kavan was born Helen Emily Woods in Cannes, as the only child of an affluent British family. Her father, Claude Charles Edward Woods, was a brewer who graduated Jesus College, Cambridge in 1888. He was the son of Matthew Charles Woods of Holeyn Hall, Wylam, and the grandson of William Woods, a banker in Newcastle upon Tyne. Her mother, Helen Eliza Bright, was the daughter of George Charles Bright, physician and son of Richard Bright, and Susan Emmeline Bright (née Cooper).

Kavan's parents travelled frequently, and she spent her childhood in both Europe and the United States. When Kavan was around 10 years old, the family moved from Somerset to Rialto, California to start an orange farm. While the business was moderately successful, Kavan's father abandoned the family and was found dead around a year later in 1915, having thrown himself from the prow of a ship. After his death, she returned to the UK where she was a boarder at Parsons Mead School in Ashstead and Malvern College in Worcestershire. Kavan has reflected upon her childhood as both incredibly lonely and neglectful, and her fiction often contains portrayals of dysfunctional family relationships.

=== Marriages and first hospitalization ===
Kavan's mother, disregarding her daughter's desire to go to Oxford, arranged an encounter between the then nineteen-year-old Kavan and Donald Ferguson, a man both ten years her senior and allegedly her mother's former lover. She married him in 1920, a few months before he took a position as a railway administrator in colonial Burma. After moving, Kavan began to write and then gave birth to her son Bryan Gratney Ferguson. In 1923 the marriage collapsed, and Kavan left Ferguson returning with Bryan to the UK.

Living alone in London during the mid-1920s, she began studying painting at the London Central School of Arts and Crafts, and continued to paint throughout her life. Kavan regularly travelled to the French Riviera where she was introduced to heroin either by racing car drivers she took up with, a tennis professional who claimed it would improve her game, or through a prescription for morphine to treat depression. While in France, she began an affair with Stuart Edmonds, whom she married in 1928. Together the couple travelled through France, Italy, and Spain before resettling in England. A year later in 1929, she published her first novel, A Charmed Circle, under the name Helen Ferguson. It follows the story of a pair of sisters, Olive and Beryl Deane, who live in a small town under the tyranny of their hermit father and mother who dote on their cruel older brother—themes she would return to frequently for the rest of her career. A Charmed Circle was followed by five more books over the next eight years: Let Me Alone (1930), The Dark Sisters (1930), A Stranger Still (1935), Goose Cross (1936), and Rich Get Rich (1937). Most notable of these books is Let Me Alone, which follows the protagonist, Anna Kavan, forced into marriage by a cruel aunt and forcefully moved to a tropical "hell" where she is tormented by both the environment and her domineering husband.

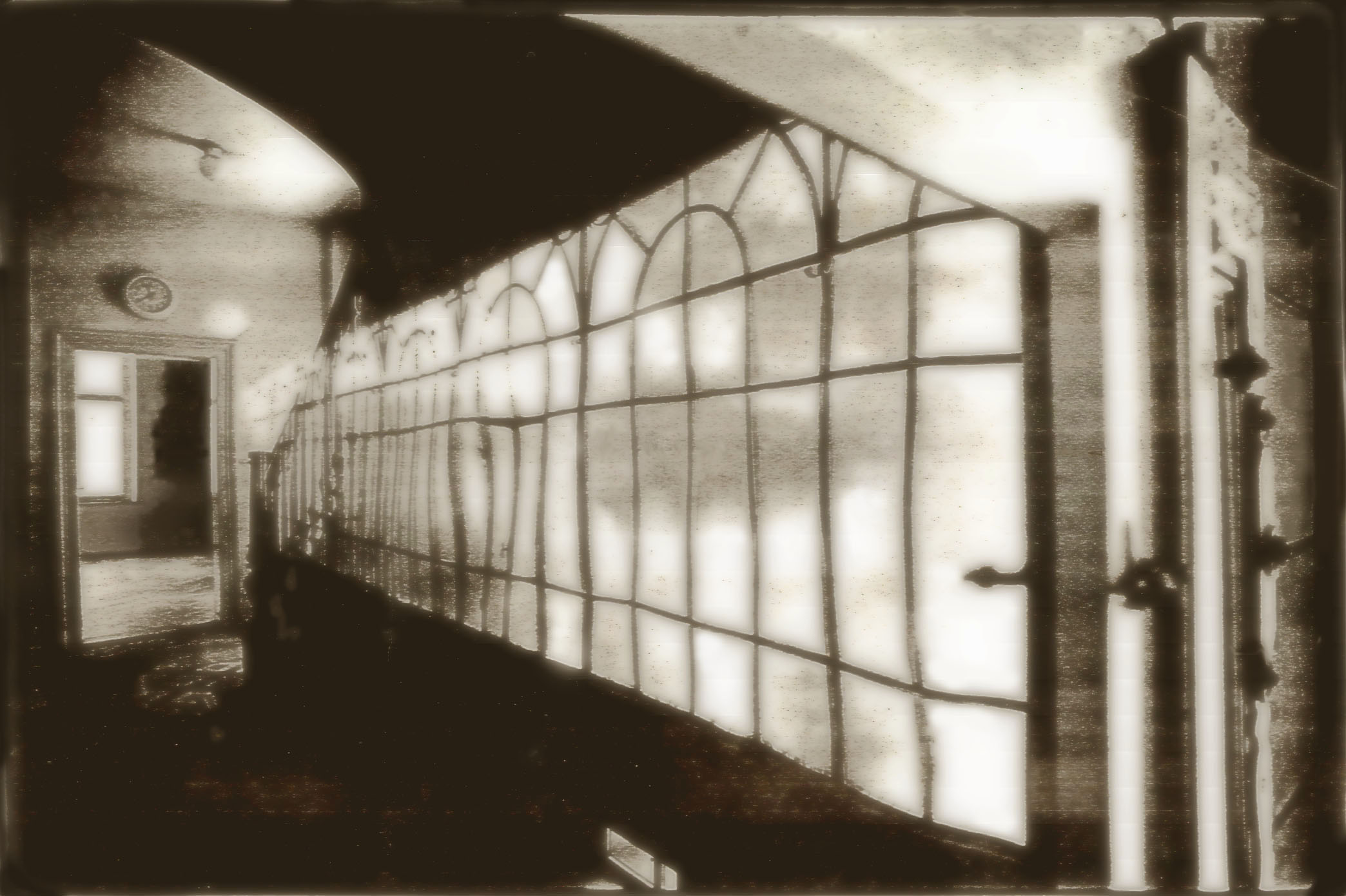
Sanatorium Bellevue: a part of the glass menagerie, the mirror of madness

Together Kavan and Edmonds had a daughter, Margaret, who died soon after childbirth. They then adopted a girl they named Susanna. In 1938, the marriage had begun to sour and Edmonds began an affair, leading the severely depressed Kavan to attempt suicide. She was then sent to a private clinic in Switzerland to recover. This would be the first of many suicide attempts, hospitalizations, and asylum incarcerations throughout Kavan's life for both depression and her lifelong heroin addiction.

=== As Anna Kavan ===
Asylum Piece (1940), a collection of short stories which explores dreamy, strange mindscapes and touches on themes of captivity, mental illness, alienation, and the difficulty of the 'patient' role, was her first book under the name Anna Kavan. This collection marks a drastic change in Kavan's writing, and all subsequent works would continue to embrace and build upon the experimental, slipstream style exemplified by the collection, which Anaïs Nin called "nocturnal language". However, she did not immediately adopt a new identity as 'Anna Kavan' in her day-to-day life. She continued to sign her letters as 'Helen' up until the end of 1940, when she moved to New York.

An inveterate traveller, Kavan initiated a long journey at the outset of World War II. From September 1939 to February 1943, she spent six months in Carmel-by-the-Sea, California. The stay inspired her novella, My Soul in China, published posthumously in 1975. She also visited the island of Bali, Indonesia, and stayed for twenty-two months in Napier, New Zealand, her final destination. Her travel itinerary was complicated by the war, which severely restricted many ordinary boat routes.

Returning to England early 1943, she worked briefly as a psychiatric nurse with soldiers suffering from war neurosis at the Mill Hill Emergency Hospital and studied for a diploma in Psychological Medicine, which she never finished. She also took a secretarial position at Horizon, an influential literary magazine edited by Cyril Connolly and founded by Peter Watson, one of her friends. There, she contributed stories, articles, and reviews from 1944 to 1946, Most notable of her work for Horizon is The Case of Bill Williams, based on her time as a nurse. During her tenure at Horizon, letters indicate that Kavan had begun using cocaine as well as heroin, and may have been supplying it to others in the office, which Connolly disapproved of.

In February 1944, Kavan's son from her first marriage, Bryan, died serving in No. 3 Commando during the Second World War.

After her return to the UK, Kavan began treatment with the German psychiatrist Karl Theodor Bluth. They shared an unconventional relationship, with Bluth becoming Kavan's close friend, creative collaborator, and doctor until his death in 1964. He also managed her heroin addiction, and supplied her with the drug. Bluth regularly dedicated poetry, writings, and drawings to Kavan. The drawings were often sexual in nature, and though there were tensions between Bluth's wife and Kavan as a result of her disapproval of their closeness, there is no evidence that their relationship ever became physical. Together, Bluth and Kavan co-wrote the allegorical satire, The Horse's Tale, published in 1949 by Gaberbocchus Press.

It was Bluth who arranged for Kavan to be treated by pioneering psychiatrist and existential psychologist Ludwig Binswanger at his Swiss clinic, the Sanatorium Bellevue (1857–1980). While at the clinic, Kavan's treatment focused on alleviating her psychological problems and finding a cure for her heroin addiction. This was unsuccessful.

Kavan continued to undergo sporadic in-patient treatments for heroin addiction and in her later years in London she lived as a virtual recluse. She enjoyed a late triumph in 1967 with her novel Ice, inspired by her time in New Zealand and the country's proximity to the inhospitable frozen landscape of Antarctica. The original manuscript was titled The Cold World. When her publisher Peter Owen sent Kavan his initial response, neither rejecting nor accepting her text, he described it as a cross between Kafka and The Avengers. Ice brought Kavan critical acclaim and it is her best-known novel, known for its strangeness, disturbing imagery, portrayals of violence and war, and slipstream writing style.

Although popularly supposed to have died of a heroin overdose, Kavan died of heart failure at her home in Kensington and was found dead on 5 December 1968. The previous night she had failed to attend a reception in honor of author Anaïs Nin at the home of her London-based publisher Peter Owen.

=== Legacy ===
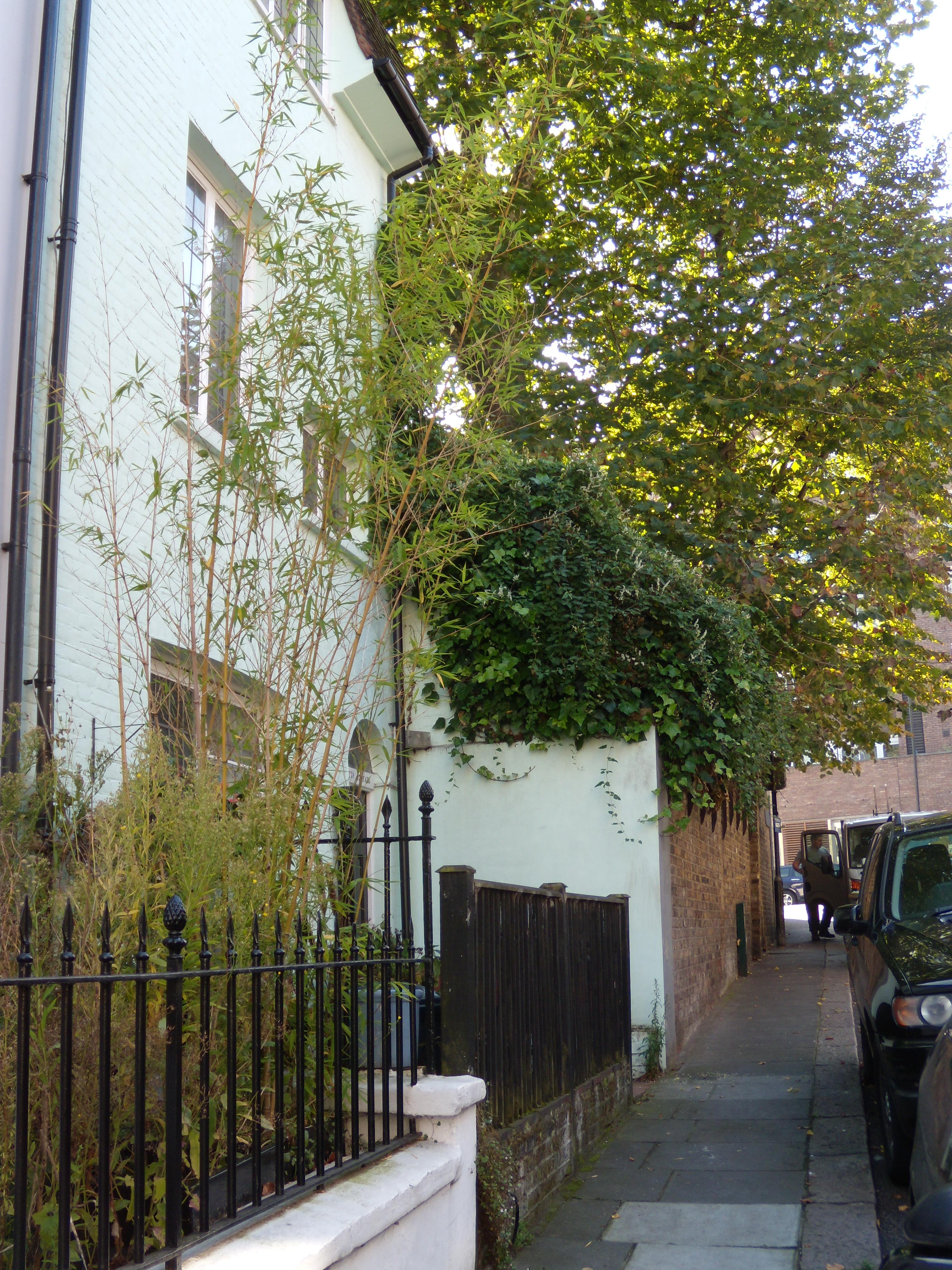
Kavan's House in Peel Street London

Many of Kavan's works were published posthumously, some edited by her friend and legatee, the Welsh writer Rhys Davies. Her writing has been compared to that of Djuna Barnes, Virginia Woolf, Sylvia Plath, Jean Rhys, Alan Burns, and Ann Quin. Brian Aldiss described her as Kafka's sister. Doris Lessing, J. G. Ballard, Anaïs Nin, Jean Rhys, Brian Aldiss, Christopher Priest, Nina Allan, Virginia Ironside and Maggie Gee are among the writers who have praised her work. Nin was perhaps the most dedicated of Kavan's early supporters, as she tried unsuccessfully for years to begin a correspondence with her.

London-based Peter Owen Publishers were long-serving advocates of Kavan's work and kept her work in print for many years. Ice was published as a Penguin Classic fiftieth-anniversary edition in 2017. Her work is now available through Pushkin Press. In 2009, the Anna Kavan Society was founded in London with the aim of encouraging wider readership and increasing academic scholarship of Kavan's work.

Kavan's paintings have been recently exhibited at the Zarrow Art Center in Tulsa, Oklahoma. The Unconventional Anna Kavan: Works on Paper exhibition displayed thirty-six paintings created by Kavan drawn from the McFarlin Library Special Collections, University of Tulsa. The exhibition Mad, Bad and Sad: Women and the Mind Doctors at Freud Museum London traced key moments in the history of hysteria and counterpointed these with women's inventive art.

== Modern scholarship and interpretations ==
In September 2014, the Anna Kavan Society organized a one-day symposium at the Institute of English Studies in association with Liverpool John Moores University Research Centre for Literature and Cultural History and Peter Owen Publishers. The Anna Kavan Symposium brought together scholars and writers to historicize Kavan's work (from the post-colonial aspects of Kavan's fiction and journalism to the interwar and World War II period), situate her within the literary and intellectual context of her times, and chart her legacy as a writer.

=== Feminist readings ===
On Ice and protofeminism, L.Timmel Duchamp said "First published in 1967, on the eve of the second wave of feminism, Ice has never been regarded as a significant work of proto-feminist literature, although scholars occasionally include it on lists of science fiction written by women before the explosion of the genre in the 1970s. The novel's surrealist form demands a different sort of reading than that of science fiction driven by narrative causality, but the text's obsessive insistence on linking the global political violence of the Cold War with the threateningly lethal sexual objectification of Woman and depicting them as two poles of the same suicidal collective will to destroy life makes Ice an interesting feminist literary experiment."

=== Genre-bending and experimental writing ===
Kavan's reception as a 'woman writer' has been complicated by her perceived lack of attention to gender politics, and her fiction has most often been interpreted as autobiography rather than experimental and aesthetic writing.

Kavan's work is difficult to situate in fixed literary categories; the scope of her work shows her experimenting with realism, surrealism and absurdism. Her work often abandons linear plot and narrative structure and portrays nameless landscapes and nameless characters. Her disruptive narratives are close to the technique of stream of consciousness associated with modernist novelists. Her best-known novel Ice has been described as slipstream, a non-realistic fiction that crosses conventional genre boundaries, where Borges' Fictions, Calvino's Invisible Cities or Ballard's Crash are cited as 'canon of slipstream writing'.

=== Politics of madness ===
Kavan's writing of madness, asylum incarceration and opiate addiction offer a complex and thought-provoking perspective on early twentieth-century psychiatry and psychotherapy. Kavan was treated in private asylums, nursing homes, and also underwent a short analysis at the Tavistock Clinic. She experienced Ludwig Binswanger's method of existential psychotherapy at the Bellevue Sanatorium, and had a close personal relationship with her longtime psychiatrist Karl Bluth. In her fiction and journalism, Kavan promoted a radical politics of madness, giving voice to the disenfranchised and marginalized psychiatric patient and presaging the anti-psychiatry movement.

In the exhibition Mad, Bad and Sad: Women and the Mind Doctors at the Freud Museum in London (2013), her work was presented alongside other female explorers of the mind, among them: Mary Lamb, Theroigne de Méricourt, Alice James, Anna O, Ida Bauer, Augustine, Elizabeth Severn, Bryher, Annie Winifred Ellerman, Hilda Doolittle, Princess Marie Bonaparte, Anna Freud, Dorothy Burlingham, Zelda Fitzgerald, Virginia Woolf, Marilyn Monroe and Sylvia Plath.

== Influences ==
=== Literature ===
Kavan was friends with the Welsh writer Rhys Davies, who based his 1975 novel Honeysuckle Girl on her early life.

=== Theater and performance ===
Choreographer and stage director, François Verret adapted Ice for the theatre in 2008.

Silverglass by DJ Britton is a play about the relationship between Rhys Davies and Anna Kavan. It was presented as a premiere during the Rhys Davies Short Story Conference 2013 held in Swansea. The play is set in the late 1960s and depicts Davies' late literary recognition as well as Kavan's final tragedy. Both writers lived 'a life of self-invention, in which secrets, sexuality and deep questions of personal identity lurked constantly in the shadows'.

=== Music and sound art ===
Sleep Has His House inspired Thalia Zedek's 1986 album Sleep Asylum.

David Tibet, the primary creative force behind the experimental music/neofolk music group Current 93, named the group's album Sleep Has His House after Anna Kavan's book of the same title.

San Francisco post-rock band Carta titled a song Kavan on their album "The Glass Bottom Boat" after Anna Kavan. The song was subsequently released as a remix by The Declining Winter on their album Haunt the Upper Hallways.

Floriane Pochon, French artist, created a sound artwork untitled Ice Lady based on the novel Ice. It was presented during Les Nuits de la Phaune, a live broadcast event initiated by the Marseille-based Radio Grenouille in 2008.

Squid's 2021 album Bright Green Field gets its title from an Anna Kavan short story of the same name. The ninth song on the record, "Peel St.," is based on Kavan's novel Ice. The name "Peel St." comes from the street Kavan lived on.

=== Visual arts ===
In an installation named Anna, the Wales-based artist duo Heather and Ivan Morison investigate the construction of the self based on ambiguous narratives. They developed an allegorical piece of object theatre that draws on the life and works of Kavan using performance and puppetry to connect the objects and play out "a brutal tale of love and loss set against the approaching threat of the ice". It has been first presented in 2012 at The Hepworth Wakefield in Wakefield, England.

== Bibliography ==
=== As Helen Ferguson ===
Re-issues after 1939 are under the name Anna Kavan.

- A Charmed Circle (London: Jonathan Cape, 1929, Open Library)
- Let Me Alone (London Jonathan Cape, 1930, Open Library)
- The Dark Sisters (London: Jonathan Cape, 1930, Open Library)
- A Stranger Still (London: Jonathan Cape, 1935, Open Library)
- Goose Cross (London: John Lane, 1936, Open Library)
- Rich Get Rich (London: John Lane, 1937, Open Library)

=== As Anna Kavan ===
- Asylum Piece (London: Jonathan Cape, 1940, Open Library)
- Change The Name (London: Jonathan Cape, 1941, Open Library)
- I Am Lazarus (London: Jonathan Cape, 1945, Open Library)
- Sleep Has His House (a.k.a. The House of Sleep (New York: Doubleday, US ed., 1947) – Sleep Has His House (London: Cassel, UK ed., 1948) Open Library)
- The Horse's Tale (with K. T. Bluth) (London: Gaberbocchus Press, 1949, Open Library)
- A Scarcity of Love (Southport, Lancashire: Angus Downie, 1956, Open Library)
- Eagle's Nest (London Peter Owen, 1957, Open Library)
- A Bright Green Field and Other Stories (London: Peter Owen, 1958, Open Library)
- Who Are You? (Lowestoft, Suffolk: Scorpion Press, 1963, Open Library)
- Ice (Peter Owen Publishers, London 1967, Open Library)

=== Published posthumously ===
- Julia and the Bazooka (London: Peter Owen, 1970)
- My Soul in China (London: Peter Owen, 1975)
- My Madness: Selected Writings (London: Macmillan, 1990)
- Mercury (London: Peter Owen, 1994)
- The Parson (London: Peter Owen, 1995)
- Guilty (London: Peter Owen, 2007)
- Machines in the Head: the Selected Short Writing of Anna Kavan (London: Peter Owen, 2019)

=== Journalism ===
All work published in Horizon: A Review of Literature and Art

- 'New Zealand: Answer to an Inquiry', Horizon 45, Sept 1943
- 'The Case of Bill Williams', Horizon 50, Feb 1944
- 'Reviews', Horizon 50, Feb 1944
- 'Reviews', Horizon 52, April 1944
- 'Reviews', Horizon 59, Nov 1944
- 'Reviews', Horizon 62, Feb 1945
- 'Reviews', Horizon 67, July 1945
- 'Reviews', Horizon 73, Jan 1946

=== Anthologized work by Anna Kavan ===
- "Department of Slight Confusion." In Book: A Miscellany. No. 3, edited by Leo Bensemann & Denis Glover. Christchurch: Caxton Press, 1941.
- "Ice Storm." In New Zealand New Writing, edited by Ian Gordon. Wellington: Progressive Publishing Society, 1942.
- "I Am Lazarus." Horizon VII, no. 41, 1943, 353–61.
- "New Zealand: An Answer to an Inquiry." Horizon VIII, no. 45, 1943, 153–61.
- "The Big Bang." In Modern Short Stories, edited by Denys Val Baker. London: Staples & Staples, 1943.
- "Face of My People." Horizon IX, no. 53, 1944, 323–35.
- "Face of My People." In Little Reviews Anthology 1945, edited by Denys Val Baker. London: Eyre & Spottiswoode, 1945.
- "I Am Lazarus." In Stories of the Forties Vol. 1, edited by Reginald Moore & Woodrow Wyatt. London: Nicholson & Watson, 1945.
- "Two New Zealand Pieces." In Choice, edited by William Sansom. London: Progressive Publishing, 1946.
- "Brave New Worlds." In Horizon, edited by Cyril Connolly. London, 1946.
- "The Professor." In Horizon, edited by Cyril Connolly. London, 1946.
- "Face of My People." In Modern British Writing, edited by Denys Val Baker. New York: Vanguard Press, 1947.
- "I Am Lazarus." In The World Within: Fiction Illuminating Neuroses of Our Time, edited by Mary Louise W. Aswell. New York: McGraw-Hill Books, 1947.
- "The Red Dogs." In Penguin New Writing, Vol. 37, edited by John Lehmann. Harmondsworth: Penguin, 1949.
- "The Red Dogs." In Pleasures of New Writing: An Anthology of Poems, Stories, and Other Prose Pieces from the Pages of New Writing, edited by John Lehmann. London: John Lehmann, 1952.
- "Happy Name." In London Magazine, edited by Alan Ross. London, 1954.
- "Palace of Sleep." In Stories for the Dead of Night, edited by Don Congdon. New York: Dell Books, 1957.
- "A Bright Green Field." In Springtime Two: An Anthology of Current Trends, edited by Peter Owen & Wendy Owen. London: Peter Owen Ltd., 1958.
- "High in the Mountains." In London Magazine, edited by Alan Ross. London, 1958.
- "Five More Days to Countdown." In Encounter XXXI, no. 1, 1968, 45–49.
- "Julia and the Bazooka." In Encounter XXXII, no. 2, 1969, 16–19.
- "World of Heroes." In Encounter XXXIII, no. 4, 1969, 9–13.
- "The Mercedes." In London Magazine 1970, 17–21.
- "Edge of Panic." In Vogue, 1 October 1971, 75–83.
- "Sleep Has His House" excerpts. In The Tiger Garden: A Book of Writers' Dreams. Foreword by Anthony Stevens. London: Serpent's Tail, 1996.
- "The Zebra Struck" In The Vintage Book of Amnesia, edited by Jonathan Lethem. New York: Vintage Books, 2000.

== Further sources ==
=== Biographies ===
- The Case of Anna Kavan: A Biography, by David Callard. London: Peter Owen, 1994
- A Stranger on Earth: The Life and Work of Anna Kavan, by Jeremy Reed. London: Peter Owen, 2006
- Anna Kavan's New Zealand, by Jennifer Sturm. Auckland: Random House Books, 2009
- Stranger Still: The Works of Anna Kavan, by Francis Booth. London:Lulu.com, 2013

=== Major archives ===
The largest collection of archival material from Kavan is held by the University of Tulsa's McFarlin Library, Department of Special Collections and University Archives. This includes her personal archive of manuscripts and artwork in the Anna Kavan papers, 1867–1991; further material in the Meic Stephens collection of Anna Kavan ephemera, 1943–1971; the Richard R. Centing collection of Anna Kavan, 1943–1991; David A. Callard collection of Anna Kavan; and the Anaïs Nin papers, 1969–1992. Other collections beyond Tulsa include The Peter Owen Archives at the Harry Ransom Center, University of Texas with correspondence between Kavan and her publisher Peter Owen and related material. Other archives contain letters from Kavan to publishers include the William A Bradley Literary Agency, Francis Henry King, Scorpion Press, John Lehmann, Kay Dick and Gerald Hamilton.

Letters from Kavan and papers relating to posthumous publication are included in the Rhys Davis Archive in the National Library of Wales. Letters from Kavan to Walter Ian Hamilton Papers between 1940 and 1955 are in the Alexander Turnbull Library, National Library of New Zealand. Other correspondence can be found at the Jonathan Cape files in the Random House Archives at the University of Reading and the Koestler Archive in Edinburgh University Library, Special Collections.

== See also ==
- Modernism
- Women's Writing
- Autobiographical novel
- Nonlinear narrative
