= The Return (Conrad short story) =

- Short story by Joseph Conrad
- Country: United Kingdom
- Language: English

Publication
- Published in: Tales of Unrest
- Publication date: 1898

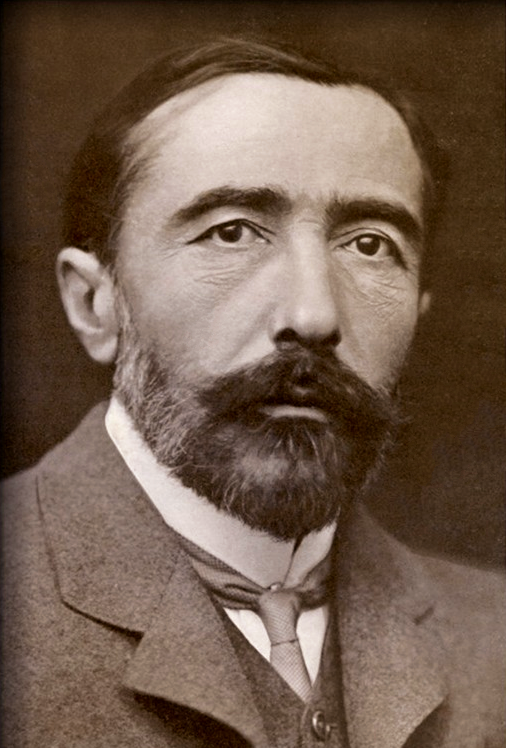
Joseph Conrad

"The Return" is a work of short fiction by Joseph Conrad, first published in 1898 in the collection Tales of Unrest by T. Fisher Unwin.

== Plot ==
Alvan Hervey is a well-to-do Englishman living in the West End of London with his wife of five years. Tall, good-looking and accomplished in business, Hervey is representative of his social class: conventional, self-complacent, and "eminently proper". He and his wife limit their social life primarily to a small circle of acquaintances. A well-connected literary gentleman in this circle convinces Hervey to provide funds to publish a society paper. Though skeptical about the paper, and considering the literary figure an "ass", he warms to the project when it proves profitable.

Alvan arrives home early one evening and finds that his wife is not in. To his dismay, he discovers a note from her in the dressing room. Instantly alarmed and deeply offended by this odd breach of decorum, he reads that letter to find that she has left the literary associate: "She's gone ... And—with that ... ass," Hervey is not heartbroken, but his humiliation sickens him physically. He contemplates a divorce with horror. His greatest outrage is that she has disturbed the propriety of his life. In his rage he utters: "I wish him joy ... Damn the woman."

To his astonishment and horror, his wife suddenly returns home that evening. The husband takes her crestfallen appearance as evidence that she feels remorse and wishes to be redeemed for her transgression. As such, he is blind to the unbearable relationship that has compelled his wife to flee. The initial shock to his self-esteem is replaced with a powerful sense of propriety: he quickly reasserts his authority. Her effort to break down her husband's superficiality has failed. Recognizing that a rapprochement with his wife is impossible, Hervey flees from the house: "He never returned."

== Background ==
"The Return" proved to be an immensely frustrating project for Conrad during the summer of 1897. He described his struggle to confident Edward Sanderson:

I've been ten weeks trying to write a story of about twenty pages of print. I haven't finished yet! And what I've written seems too contemptible for words. Not in conception, perhaps,—but in execution. The state of affairs spells ruin. I can't help it! I can't!

Even as "The Return" was collected in Tales of Unrest (1898), Conrad remarked: "My innermost feeling, now, is that it is a left-handed work."

Literary critic Laurence Graver reports that Conrad's opinion of the story improved when publisher Edward Garnett decided to collect the work in its entirety rather than serializing it. In a measure of Conrad's ambivalence towards the work, he later wrote that "The Return" was "not a tale for puppy dogs nor for maids of thirteen. I am not in the least ashamed of it. Quite the reverse."

== Critical assessment ==
Conrad's doubt as to the worthiness of "The Return" was seconded by critics who, according to Jocelyn Baines, "virtually ignored" the work. Literary critic Laurence Graver, in Conrad's Short Fiction (1969), wrote:

Weakened by lifeless dialogue, an unconvincing setting, and tiresome characters, it is an extravagantly self-indulgent story, a work that would have been perhaps bearable only at one-third its length.

Baines reports that "the story tends in places to ponderousness and prolixity, but it is packed with remarkably sharp insight and ironical wit."

Critic Alfred J. Guerard declares that "The Return" exposes Conrad's difficulty in handling marital strife, describing it as "the most troubled expression of Conrad's confused misogyny and the extreme example of his creative bewilderment in the presence of a sexual situation." Guerard judges the work to be "Conrad's worst story of any length, and one of the worst written by a great novelist." He continued:

There can be little doubt that Conrad was involved in this wretched story; the confused involvement is betrayed by gross crudites in method ... [the work] could never come under artistic control ... some of the worst that Conrad ever wrote.

Literary critic Edward W. Said considers "The Return" to be "in some ways the most interesting" of Conrad's early fiction.

== Theme ==
Literary critic Jocelyn Baines calls the story "a tragedy of misunderstanding". Baines writes:

There is something strangely compulsive about the story because it seems that these two people are doomed not to make contact. They are both able to have a revelation, but it is impossible for them to share it.

The thematic center, according to Said, resides in the chronicling of a man's failure to grasp the significance of his wife's confused attempt to confront her husband with the emptiness and absurdity of their lives. Hervey's rage at his wife's perfidy is centered in his shame: "The powerful influence of shame is what, I think, makes this story an epitome of Conrad's earliest group of short works." The threat of public shame thrust Hervey into a crisis of self. Said comments on the Sartreian crisis facing the protagonist:

Harvey is plunged into a realm in which "inexcusable truth" and "valid pretense" are confused. In other words, he cannot distinguish between the fact of her betrayal and his scandalized persuasion that she should not have betrayed him. As a category, truth can have no interest for him. It this attitude tor truth that admits him into a new realm of moral suffering.

== Sources ==
- Baines, Jocelyn. 1960. Joseph Conrad: A Critical Biography, McGraw-Hill Book Company, New York. ISBN 978-0297167556
- Graver, Laurence. 1969. Conrad's Short Fiction. University of California Press, Berkeley, California. ISBN 0-520-00513-9
- Guerard, Albert J. 1965. Conrad: The Novelist. Harvard University Press, Cambridge, Massachusetts. LOC Catalog Card Number 58-8995. ISBN 978-0674163508
- Said, Edward W. 1966. The Past and Present: Conrad's Shorter Fiction, from Said's Joseph Conrad and the Fiction of Autobiography.Harvard University Press, in Joseph Conrad: Modern Critical Reviews, Harold Bloom editor. Chelsea House Publishers. 1987 pp. 29–51 ISBN 0-87754-642-8
