= Tales of Unrest =

1898 collection of tales by Joseph Conrad

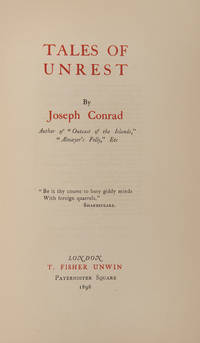
- First edition cover
- Author: Joseph Conrad
- Language: English
- Genre: Frame story, Short Stories
- Publisher: T. Fisher Unwin
- Publication date: August 26, 1898
- Publication place: United Kingdom
- Media type: Print (hardcover)
- Pages: 297
- OCLC: 12160919

Tales of Unrest is a collection of five works of short fiction by Polish-British author Joseph Conrad. Four of the five works were previously published as serials in literary journals before appearing in the volume, published in 1898 by T. Fisher Unwin.

== Stories ==
All of the works in Tales of Unrest, except "The Return" were published as serials before being collected in 1898. The name of the literary journal and date appears after each title.

- “The Idiots” (The Savoy, October 1896)
- “An Outpost of Progress” (Cosmopolis, June–July 1897)
- “The Lagoon” (The Cornhill Magazine, January 1897)
- "Karain: a Memory" (Blackwood’s Magazine, November 1897)
- “The Return” (never appeared as a serial)

== Critical Assessment ==
When Conrad’s first collection of short fiction appeared in 1898, he was already regarded "a writer of considerable standing and achievement" among critics, though "his popular appeal was limited". Literary critic Albert J. Guerard places The Tales of Unrest among Conrad’s outstanding works produced between 1897 and 1907, and "the most astounding periods of creative energy in the career of any novelist".

“Tales of Unrest is inchoate yet typical Conrad—inchoate in the sense that it is marked by daring, diffuseness, energy, uncertainty, and all the other signs of the apprentice hand; yet typical in that all of the stories are based on memory and reminiscence, made of situations of murder and mayhem to examine problems of conduct, and are enlivened by Conrad’s theatrical sense of history".—Literary critic Laurence Graver in Conrad’s Short Fiction (1969)

== Theme ==
Of the five stories that compose Tales of Unrest, four are concerned with destructive illusions, in which the protagonists suffer "the crippling nature of moral blindness". Literary critic Laurence Graver notes that while the word "return" appears at key moments in the stories, "no return, physical or metaphorical, is possible".

== Sources ==
- Baines, Jocelyn. 1960. Joseph Conrad: A Critical Biography, McGraw-Hill Book Company, New York. ISBN 978-0297167556
- Graver, Laurence. 1969. Conrad’s Short Fiction. University of California Press, Berkeley, California. ISBN 0-520-00513-9
- Guerard, Albert J. 1965. Conrad: The Novelist. Press, Cambridge, Massachusetts. LOC Catalog Card Number 58-8995.ISBN 978-0674163508
- J.H. Stape, ed. The Cambridge Companion to Joseph Conrad, Cambridge University Press, 2006.
- Project Gutenberg Works by Joseph Conrad at Project Gutenberg (plain text and HTML)
