= Eastside Projects =

Artist-run space in Birmingham, England

Coordinates: 52.47662°N 1.88218°W

- Facade of Eastside Projects on Heath Mill Lane.
- Established: 2008
- Location: Digbeth, Birmingham, West Midlands, England
- Type: Contemporary art
- Directors: Gavin Wade, Ruth Claxton
- Website: eastsideprojects.org

Eastside Projects is an artist-run space in the Digbeth area of Birmingham, England. It is a free public space that is imagined and organised by artists. It commissions and presents experimental contemporary art exhibitions and proposes ways in which art may be useful to society.[1] Eastside Projects was founded by six artists: Simon Bloor, Tom Bloor, Céline Condorelli, Ruth Claxton, James Langdon, and Gavin Wade. Eastside Projects is a not-for-profit company limited by guarantee.

The current directors are Ruth Calxton and Gavin Wade. Group exhibitions have featured artists and organisations such as Art & Language, Mel Bochner and Grizedale Arts, while past solo shows include Liam Gillick, Shezad Dawood, Carey Young, Sahjan Kooner, William Pope.L, Sonia Boyce, and Dan Graham. Since the space opened in 2008, it has made a substantial contribution to Birmingham and its burgeoning reputation as a centre for contemporary art; through Extra ordinary People, the We Are Eastside Consortium, and other partnerships, it has successfully supported the developing ecology of artists, projects, and public art commissions.

== Background ==
"Pleasure Island" (2007), Heather and Ivan Morison

Eastside Projects opened on 26 September 2008 with its inaugural exhibition, "This is the Gallery and the Gallery is Many Things". Since its launch, the exhibition programme has featured a series of exhibitions that use the mode of a medium to explore different ideas and representations of that medium: Sculpture Show" (2009), "Abstract Cabinet Show" (2009), "Curtain Show" (2010), "Book Show" (2010), "Narrative Show" (2011), and "Painting Show" (2011–2012).[2] Led by Gavin Wade and Ruth Claxton, the space is run by practising artists, artist-curators, artist-engineers, artist organisers, ect who combine careers within the UK and international art worlds while working at Eastside Projects.

Eastside Projects challenges what an art gallery can be by turning the staff offices, and building structures as artist commissions. The current staff offices are designed by K4 Architects, while previous artists Ivan and Heather Morrison built the offices as a wooden structure ‘Pleasure Island’. This has transformed over time into an evolving gallery-space which wears its history and influences on its sleeve. In 2011, Eastside Projects was accepted into Arts Council England's National Portfolio, securing funding for a further three years from 2012. The gallery has also received additional funding from a Paul Hamlyn Breakthrough Award and works in partnership with Birmingham City University who support the gallery through project funding and the use of equipment or facilities. In 2017 Eastside Projects closed due to refurbishment work supported by Birmingham City University, Arts Council England, Custard Factory and K4 Architects which resulted in a £250,000 revamp of the site. Eastside Projects re-opened in 2018, with Another Reality Awaits You.

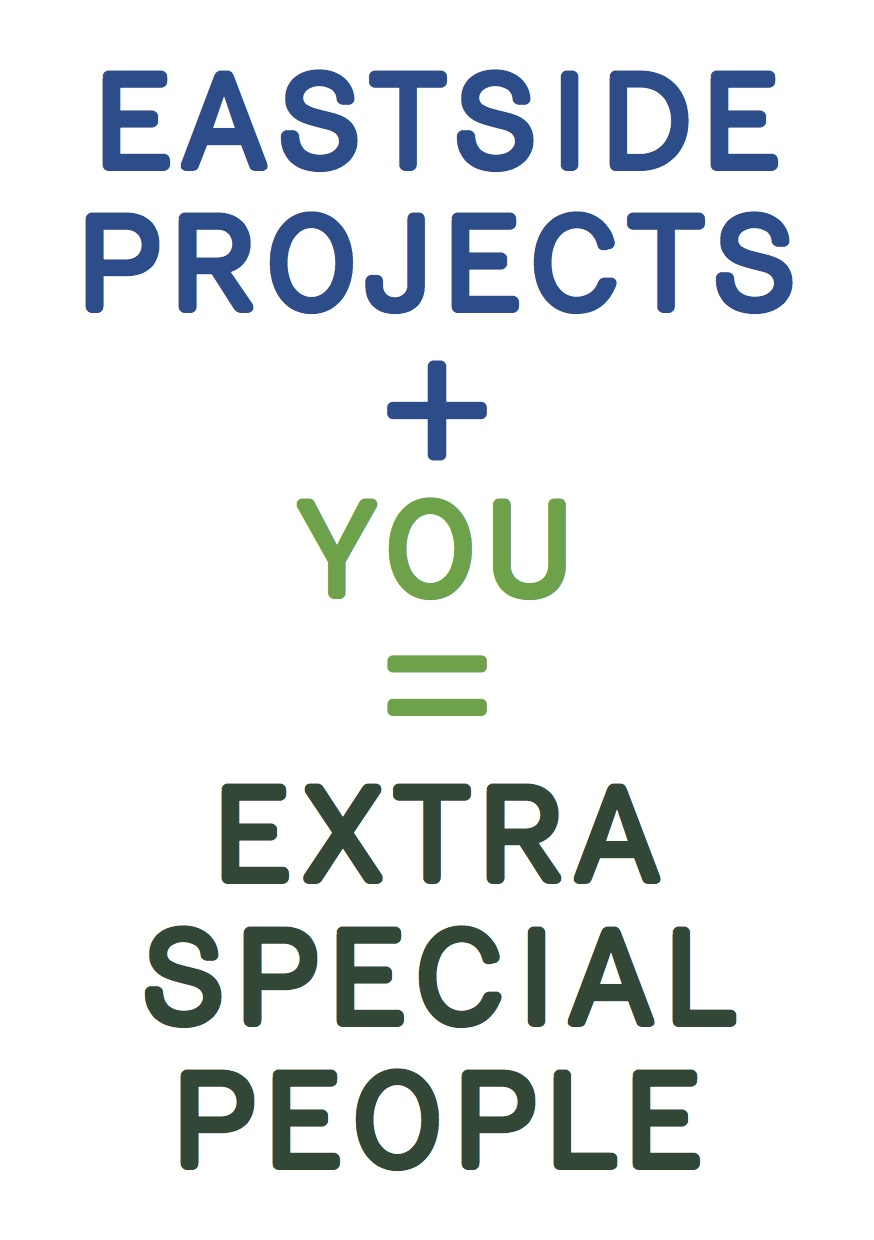
Eastside Projects + You

== Long Term Works ==
Eastside Projects' organisational model promotes the intertwining of exhibition space and programme. Making the gallery an artwork within itself. There are a number of long-term works located within the gallery, which formed elements of previous exhibitions. "Local Myths", a totemic sculpture by Jennifer Tee has been a permanent fixture in the gallery since 2010. The handle of the front door is a work entitled "Wilkommen. Bienvenue. Welcome. C'mon in." by Artist Matthew Harrison. The old office was a structure, "Pleasure Island", originally designed by Heather and Ivan Morison for the Welsh Pavilion at the Venice Biennale in 2007.[4]

== Extra Ordinary People ==
Extra Ordinary People EOP, (originally Extra Special People) is an associate membership scheme at Eastside Projects. EOP supports the development of work, ideas, connections and careers and programmes a huge range of events for artists, writers, curators and those with a more general interest in contemporary art. EOP organises regular social events which can take the form of talks, crits, practical workshops, practice-led group discussions, support and mentoring surgeries.

Every year Eastside Projects invites EOP members to write an exhibition proposal for the Members Show in Gallery Two. In 2023 the artist fee was £3000, with a Production fee of £2000

== Incidental Artists Model ==
As of 2022-2026, Eastside Projects reworked their organisational structure to change the way they commission and pay artists. Taking reference from the Artist Placement Group (APG) in the mid-1960s the APG proposed and made strenuous efforts to radically transform artists’ relation to society. Adopting the role of the incidental person, the group proposed getting involved in the processes of other organisations, from steel factories to government offices. APG considered artists a hugely underused human creative resource that offered a potential benefit of tangential thinking and making.

‘’Artists are catalysts. We are the dreamers and doers, collaborators and supporters, guests and hosts who work alongside communities to imagine and co-evolve our civic infrastructure” - Eastside Projects, 2022

Currently an Incidental Artist will work with Eastside Projects for a period of 18 months, during which the Incidental Artist will spend time researching and developing their practice for a public sharing event. The Incidental artist fee is £10,000, with a £10,000 production fee.
