= Stanley Unwin =

Stanley Unwin may refer to:

- Stanley Unwin (comedian) (1911–2002), South African-born comedic writer and performer
- Stanley Unwin (publisher) (1884–1968), British publisher, founder of George Allen and Unwin
