= The Idiots (short story) =

1896 short story by Joseph Conrad

- Short story by Joseph Conrad
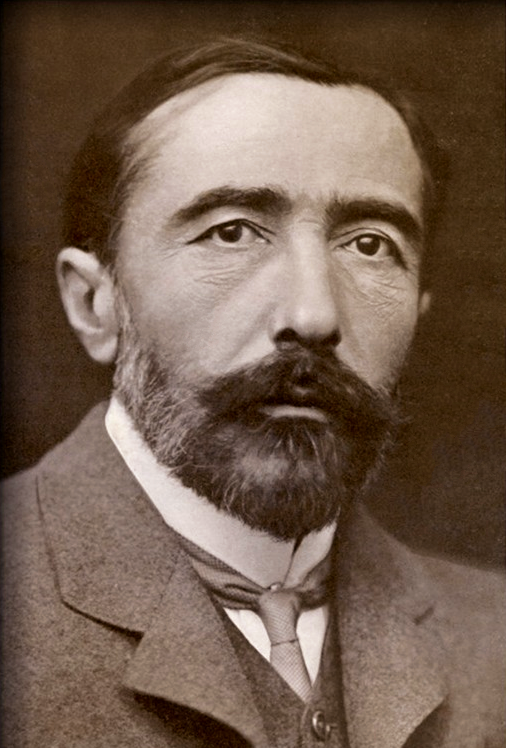
- Portrait of Joseph Conrad
- Language: English
- Genre: Short story

Publication
- Published in: The Savoy
- Publication type: Magazine
- Publication date: October 1896

"The Idiots" is a short story by Joseph Conrad, his first to be published. It first appeared in The Savoy in 1896. The story was included in the Conrad collection Tales of Unrest, published in 1898.

Set in Brittany, the story describes a couple whose children have intellectual disability; the strain on the family leads eventually to murder.

== Background ==
The story was written during Joseph Conrad's honeymoon; he rented a house on Île-Grande, on the north coast of Brittany, from April to August 1896. His wife Jessie later wrote that "much of our Île-Grande life is in that short story.... The stone-cutters are in it, our landlady is in it, and the feeling of our surroundings, perhaps a little more sombrely than the reality", and explained how the story originated: while being driven from Lannion to Île-Grande, the driver pointed out "the idiots", saying "Four - hein. And all in the same family. That's a little too much. And the priests say it's God's will!"

“The Idiots” was written in the midst of Conrad's struggle to compose The Rescuer, a novel he would not complete and publish until 1920 under the title The Rescue.

Conrad had a poor opinion of this story, writing that it was "an obviously derivative piece of work"; he did not name a model, but critics, among them Jocelyn Baines and Laurence Graver have supposed that it was influenced by Guy de Maupassant.

== Story summary ==
The reader is introduced to "the idiots" as the narrator is driven near Ploumar in Brittany and they are pointed out on the road by the driver.

The earlier story of the family follows. Jean-Pierre Bacadou, returning from military service, finds his elderly father's farm is in a poor state, and resolves to make improvements. He marries Susan; the celebration of the event at the farm is picturesquely described.

Twins are born; Jean-Pierre notices something is wrong. His wife says, dully, "When they sleep they are like other people's children." A third child is born. "That child, like the other two, never smiled, never stretched its hand to her, never spoke..."

The parish priest calls on the local landowner, the Marquis de Chavanes, to say that Jean-Pierre Bacadou, a republican, has attended Mass, an unheard-of event. The Marquis, a royalist and former mayor, thinks this is significant, and thinks he will win the next communal election, since he regards Jean-Pierre as influential.

A girl is born to the couple; she is like their other children. One evening, driving through Ploumar, Jean-Pierre stops and walks up to the churchyard gates and calls, "Hey there! Come out!" Back in the cart, he says to his wife, "See? Nobody. I've been made a fool." In the autumn he angrily wanders about the fields, aware that there is no one to take over the farm.

Susan's mother, Madame Levaille, is a businesswoman who has a local granite quarry and a shop.

Jean-Pierre angrily approaches Susan, and she kills him with scissors. After telling her mother, who is appalled by her daughter's actions, she goes down to the beach, delirious. One of the seaweed-gatherers there approaches to help her, but she thinks it is Jean-Pierre's ghost. Trying to escape from him, she eventually falls from a cliff and dies.

The Marquis de Chavanes makes arrangements to have Madame Levaille made guardian of the children and administrator of the farm, rather than a member of the republican Bacadous.

== Literary influence: Maupassant and Flaubert ==
The inspiration for "The Idiots" was largely derived from the works of Conrad's older French contemporaries Guy de Maupassant and Gustave Flaubert. Literary critic Joycyln Baines acknowledges Conrad's debt to Maupassant with this caveat: "It is a well-told tale and effective story, but without much importance in Conrad's work, being, as he confessed, derivative of Maupassant. The writing is a little too artificial in places, but there are some fine touches." Baines offers this passage to demonstrate her latter point:

The darkness came from the hills, flowed over the coast, put out the red fires of sunset, and went on to seaward pursuing the retiring tide. The wind dropped with the sun, leaving a maddened sea and a devastated sky. The heavens above the house seemed to draped in black rags, held up here and there by pins of fire.

The story is divided into four segments: the introduction of the disabled children; the circumstances of the unfortunate parents; the violent climax in which the wife murders her husband and commits suicide; and the denouement involving the festivities at a local wedding. Literary critic Laurence Graver writes:

The story concludes with a brief epilogue in which the restoration of order in the village is shown to have richly ironic overtones. Anyone who remembers Maupassant's "Mother Savage", "The Model", or "The Corsican Bandit" will recognize Conrad's debt.

Graver considers Conrad's handling of the climax of the story "preposterous", but notes that the epilogue "returns to the terseness and irony" characteristic of Maupassant.

Critic Alfred J. Guerard identifies the sequences in "The Idiots" describing the wedding ceremony and banquet with Flaubert's Madame Bovary (1856). Guerard writes: "A brief account of the wedding procession and the feast immediately recalls Madame Bovary, and any useful derivative was from Flaubert." Guerard further notes that the story opens with a first-person narration, then within a few pages, shifts to an omniscient narrative, as does the opening to Flaubert's famous novel.

Guerard describes the story as "almost unique in Conrad's work as an attempt to dramatize fictional material immediately after observing it."

== Theme ==
Literary critic Laurence Graver contrasts Conrad's handling of his themes in "The Idiots" with his fiction written in his maturity:

Looking back on "The Idiots" with a knowledge of Conrad's later fiction, one can see a number of obsessive preoccupations behind the borrowed mask. Characters revealed at moments of extreme exasperation, a hero enslaved by a destructive, a denouement of exile, bloodletting and suicide - all these are motifs with which the reader of Victory and Nostromo is well acquainted.

Graver adds this caveat: Unlike the protagonists in these later works, "the people in "The Idiots" display neither resiliency or thoughtfulness, and they are victimized without ever being tested."

In this tale of "pathetic sadness and terror", Conrad anticipates a thematic concern that appears in his mature literary fiction. Literary critic Edward W. Said writes:

The content of the tale, for all its sensational operatics, seems somewhat obscure...Between the recollecting narrator and the actual tale there is a barrier that is eternally closed. For a novelist, however, a barrier is not something merely to be ignored, and this hedge of mystery, as Conrad develops it in later tales, becomes an important fact in the story.

== Sources ==
- Baines, Jocelyn. 1960. Joseph Conrad: A Critical Biography, McGraw-Hill Book Company, New York. ISBN 978-0297167556
- Graver, Laurence. 1969. Conrad's Short Fiction. University of California Press, Berkeley, California. ISBN 0-520-00513-9
- Guerard, Albert J. 1965. Conrad: The Novelist. Press, Cambridge, Massachusetts. LOC Catalog Card Number 58-8995.ISBN 978-0674163508
- Said, Edward W. 1966. The Past and Present: Conrad's Shorter Fiction, from Said's Joseph Conrad and the Fiction of Autobiography.Harvard University Press, in Joseph Conrad: Modern Critical Reviews, Harold Bloom editor. Chelsea House Publishers. 1987 pp. 29-51 ISBN 0-87754-642-8
