= House of Sleep =

House of Sleep may refer to:

- The House of Sleep, a 1997 novel by Jonathan Coe
- "House of Sleep", a song by Amorphis from their 2006 album Eclipse
- The House of Sleep, the original title of Sleep Has His House, a 1947 novel by Anna Kavan
- "The House of Sleep", a 1983 composition by Mark Edgley Smith
