= Thomas Fisher Unwin =

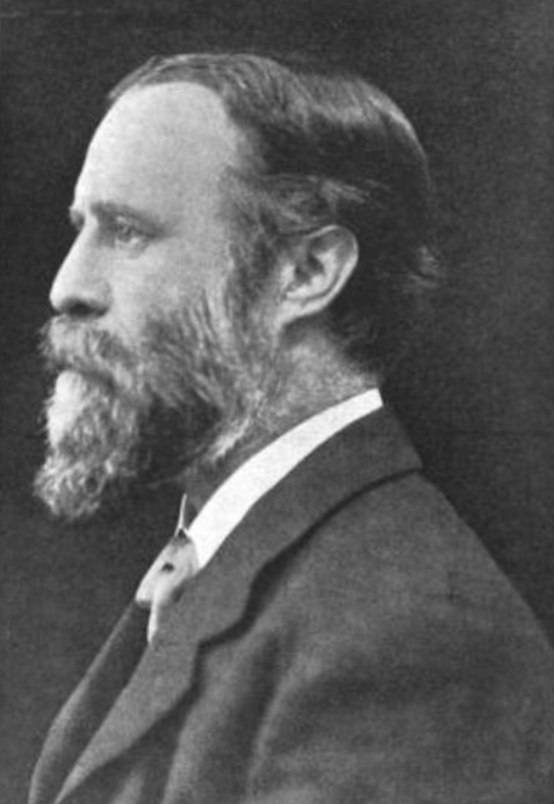
- In The Sketch, 15 January 1896
- Born: 24 January 1848; London, England
- Died: 6 February 1935 (aged 87); Midhurst, Sussex, England
- Occupation: Publisher
- Spouse: Jane Cobden (m. 1892)

Thomas Fisher Unwin (24 January 1848 – 6 February 1935) was an English publisher who founded the publishing house of T. Fisher Unwin.

== Early life and career ==
Thomas Fisher Unwin was born on 24 January 1848 in 33 Lowgate Hill, London. He was the son of the printer Jacob Unwin (1802–1855), who was the founder of the firm Unwin Brothers and of the Gresham Press, and of his wife, Isobel, (née Hall). He attended the City of London School and then worked for the London publishing firm, Jackson, Walford, and Hodder (which was the predecessor firm of Hodder & Stoughton).

In 1882, he founded his own publishing firm, T. Fisher Unwin. In 1885, he started a British book series titled The Story of the Nations. It reflected his views, which were liberal and internationalist; and also his wife's interest in abolitionism and suffragism. The series was published in the USA by G. P. Putnam, though not in identical form.

He was a co-founder of the Johnson Club, formed 13 September 1884, to mark the hundred years since the death of Dr Samuel Johnson.

In 1896, he jointly founded The Publishers Association.

== Personal life ==
He was married to Jane Cobden, the Liberal politician, daughter of the Victorian reformer and statesman Richard Cobden.

His nephew, Stanley Unwin, founded the publishing firm George Allen and Unwin.

He died at his home in Midhurst, Sussex on 6 February 1935.

== Works ==
Some editions of T. Fisher Unwin:

- The Story of the Nations (1885–1905, 1st ed.; 1911, 2nd ed.), 65 Volumes.
- The Story of a Puppet or The Adventures of Pinocchio (1892), by Carlo Collodi.
- The English Peasant (1893), by Richard Heath.
- The Tales of John Oliver Hobbes (1894), by John Oliver Hobbes.
- By Reef and Palm (1894, 1st ed.; 1916, 7th ed.), by Louis Becke.
- My Climbs in the Alps and Caucasus (1895), by Albert Frederick Mummery.
- In the years 1895-1898 Unwin published the first novel by Joseph Conrad, Almayer’s Folly, and his An Outcast of the Islands and Tales of Unrest.
- Man and Maid (1906), by E. Nesbit.
- The Slave Girl of Agra (1909), by Romesh Chunder Dutt.
- Life of Tolstoy (1911), by Romain Rolland.
- Confiscation in Irish history (1917), by William Francis Thomas Butler.
