= Heather Peak and Ivan Morison =

British collaborative artist duo

Heather Peak and Ivan Morison

Heather Peak (born 1973) and Ivan Morison (born 1974) are British artists whose collaborative practice combines sculpture, architecture, performance art and social practice. They have worked as an artist duo since 2003 and are co-directors of Studio Morison. Their projects often take the form of site-specific structures, temporary civic spaces, performances and collective events, and explore subjects including narrative, community, shelter, ecology and responses to change. They were among the artists representing Wales at the 52nd Venice Biennale in 2007.

== Background and early work ==
Peak was born in Desborough, England, in 1973, and Morison was born in Nottingham, England, in 1974. They have lived and worked in Brighton, North Wales, Birmingham and Herefordshire.

Their early work incorporated gardening, travel, field research, fiction and forms of amateur enquiry. A mail-art project began in 2001, when Morison sent postcards reporting on an allotment in Edgbaston, Birmingham; it subsequently expanded to include observations and fictional narratives from the artists' travels. During a four-week cargo-ship journey from Shanghai to Auckland, they wrote the science-fiction novel Divine Vessel (2003). A 2006 profile in Frieze described their practice as performative, with role-playing and social personae used to explore how identities are constructed.

Peak and Morison were selected for British Art Show 6, which toured Britain in 2005 and 2006. For its Bristol presentation they created I lost her near Fantasy Island. Life has not been the same (2006), staging a jack-knifed lorry from which 25,000 flowers were spread across the city centre. Members of the public dispersed the work by taking away the flowers.

The flower industry was also the subject of The Land of Cockaigne (2007), an installation at Bloomberg Space in London in which thousands of flowers were arranged on industrial trolleys and later distributed to visitors. Later in 2007, they exhibited Pleasure Island in the Welsh presentation at the Venice Biennale. The timber structure was subsequently adapted as an office and meeting space at Eastside Projects in Birmingham.

== Public art and collaborative projects ==
Large-scale, temporary structures and collective construction became increasingly prominent in Peak and Morison's work. Journée des Barricades (2008), made for One Day Sculpture in Wellington, New Zealand, blocked a city street with an assemblage of vehicles, tyres, appliances and other salvaged material. It was assembled and removed within a 24-hour period.

Installation view of Anna, The Hepworth Wakefield, 2012

Black Cloud (2009) was a temporary, blackened-timber pavilion in Victoria Park, Bristol, made with architect Sash Reading and erected through a community barn-raising. It served as a meeting place and venue for public events before being dismantled, and was later reconstructed at The Hepworth Wakefield and Eastside Projects.

Plaza, Vancouver Art Gallery Offsite, 2010

For Plaza (2010), commissioned for the Vancouver Art Gallery's Offsite programme, they created an open structure from charred and untreated timber. Local artists, craftspeople and participants contributed to its construction. A review in Canadian Art related the installation to the duo's recurring interest in temporary structures as places for community gathering and in the possibility of transforming urban space.

Sleepers Awake (2011), first presented at Milton Creek Country Park in Kent, used a large illuminated balloon to create the appearance of a second sun at night. In Anna (2012), installed at The Hepworth Wakefield, the artists used sculpture and object theatre to construct an allegorical response to the life and writing of Anna Kavan, particularly her novel Ice.

Skirt of the Black Mouth (2012–15), commissioned during the redevelopment of Tate Modern, used concrete, charred timber and wooden cobbles to define a temporary public space between the gallery's construction site and the surrounding neighbourhood. From 2013 to 2015, Shadow Curriculum involved a two-year collaboration with the students and teachers of Highshore School in south London. A 34-metre Douglas fir was felled, transported and transformed into a permanent work for the school's new premises; the process was documented in a 2015 exhibition at South London Gallery.

== Recent work ==
MOTHER … (2020), commissioned by Wysing Arts Centre for Wicken Fen in Cambridgeshire, is a timber-and-straw pavilion based on the form of a traditional fenland hayrick. It was conceived as a place to sit, shelter and consider relationships between the natural world and mental health.

Silence—Alone in a World of Wounds, Yorkshire Sculpture Park, 2021

In 2021, Studio Morison completed Silence—Alone in a World of Wounds at Yorkshire Sculpture Park. The circular pavilion was constructed from approximately 25 tonnes of timber, rammed earth, thatch and paper, with birch trees growing through its structure. Designed as a place for listening to the natural environment, the work was intended to weather and eventually decay.

Also launched in 2021, Small Bells Ring centres on the RV Furor Scribendi, a functioning narrowboat containing a floating library of short stories and spaces for readers and writers. It was co-commissioned by Super Slow Way and the Coventry City of Culture Trust in collaboration with library services and communities in Lancashire and Coventry.

Moon Palace (2023) is a mobile observatory constructed from a converted school bus. Inspired by the engineer and astronomer John Smeaton, it combined telescopes and astronomical equipment with spaces for reading, conversation and community activity while touring Leeds.

The artists' website describes their collaboration as continuing alongside independently authored work by both Peak and Morison.

== Publications and collections ==
Their publication Falling into Place (Book Works, 2009) is a fictionalised account of their architectural shelter works. The retrospective monograph Love Me or Leave Me Alone: The Very Public Art of Heather Peak and Ivan Morison, with texts by Claire Doherty and Gavin Wade, was published by Art/Books in 2022.

The United Kingdom's Government Art Collection holds two works from their 2014 series Knives Are Mothers: Beside a sealed up building and Inside he imagines his wife and daughter.
