= Richard Heath (writer) =

English journalist and author

Richard Heath (1831–1912) was an English journalist and author.

His articles on rural topics were published together in The English Peasant (1893), which was part of T. Fisher Unwin's "The Reformer's Bookshelf" series. The Times selected it as one of its "Books of the Week" and said Heath "was tolerably well known a couple of decades ago as an eloquent and persevering, if not always discriminating, champion of the agricultural labourer". They added that the book was written with a "vein of Christian Socialism".

== Works ==
- Edgar Quinet: His Early Life and Writings (1881).
- Historic Landmarks in the Christian Centuries (1882).
- The English Via Dolorosa; or, Glimpses of the History of the Agricultural Labourer (1884).
- The Reformation in France: from the Dawn of Reform to the Revocation of the Edict of Nantes (1886).
- The Reformation in France: from the Revocation of the Edict of Nantes to the incorporation of the Reformed Churches into the state (1888).
- The English Peasant: Studies: Historical, Local, and Biographic (1893).
- Anabaptism, from its rise at Zwickau to its fall at Münster 1521-1536 (1895).
