= Condorelli =

Condorelli is an Italian surname from Sicily. Notable people with the surname include:

- Céline Condorelli (born 1974), French-Italian artist
- Santo Condorelli (born 1995), American competitive swimmer

== See also ==
- Contarelli
- Cottarelli
