= Ice (Kavan novel) =

1967 novel by Anna Kavan

- Cover for the 1st UK edition
- Author: Anna Kavan
- Language: English
- Genres: Dystopia, Surrealism
- Publisher: Peter Owen Publishers
- Publication date: 1967
- Publication place: United Kingdom
- Pages: 158

Ice is a novel by British writer Anna Kavan, published in 1967. Ice was Kavan's last work to be published before her death, the first to land her mainstream success, and remains her best-known work. Generally regarded as genre-defying, it has been labelled a work of science fiction, Nouveau roman, and slipstream fiction.

In 2017 Penguin Books published for the Penguin Classics a 50th anniversary edition. The edition contains a foreword by Jonathan Lethem and an afterword by Kate Zambreno.

== Background ==
Kavan completed an early draft of Ice in March 1964. It was first submitted to Weidenfeld & Nicolson by Francis King but was rejected. It was then accepted by Peter Owen, though he expressed doubts about the manuscript, citing a deficiency of character and narrative. Kavan defended the work, writing that "it is not meant to be realistic writing. It's a sort of present day fable..." She "saw the story as one of those recurring dreams ... which at times become nightmare. This dreamlike atmosphere is the essence of the [novel]." Early readers described the novel as a cross between the work of Kafka and British television series The Avengers, which Kavan felt was an apt description.

Over the next six months, the manuscript went through extensive revisions. Owen accepted the manuscript again, and convinced Kavan to change the title from The Ice World to simply Ice.

Like most of Kavan's novels, Ice contains autobiographical elements that are fictionalized, but for this novel in particular are used in a surrealistic sense: Kavan's extensive travelling, her marriage to artist Stuart Edmonds, and her unhappy childhood are important inspirations for elements of the novel. The imagery of ice was inspired by Kavan's time in New Zealand, when she was not far from Antarctica. The Madagascan Indris, an element which reoccurs throughout the story, came to Kavan after watching a David Attenborough nature documentary.

== Plot outline ==
Ice is set during an apocalypse in which a massive, monolithic ice shelf, caused by nuclear war, is engulfing the earth. The male protagonist, and narrator of the story, spends the narrative feverishly pursuing a young, nameless woman, and contemplating the overwhelming but conflicting feelings he has for her, that slowly end up being intruded by the worsening atmosphere of the setting. Initially he must negotiate the presence of the woman's husband and later he faces more serious opposition from the Warden who seeks to keep her under his control. Christopher Priest, in his introduction to the novel, writes that the book is "virtually plotless" and "told in scenes of happenstance and coincidence."

== Style and themes ==
Ice has been described as dreamlike, cryptic, unsettling, and hallucinogenic. There are no named characters, and the plot and geography of the story may seem arbitrary by the standards of realistic or popular fiction. The narrative is regularly interrupted by dreams and hallucinations, and it is suggested that the narrator is delusional.

Attention has been paid to the recurring imagery of coldness and encroaching ice, which is commonly associated with Kavan's struggles with heroin addiction and mental illness. Other critics argue that the symbolism resists straightforward biographical interpretations.

The novel's preoccupations with violent sexuality and female agency have invited feminist interpretations.

== Reception ==
Ice was Kavan's first major literary success. After the publication of the novel, she was profiled in the September 1967 edition of Nova, alongside Jean Rhys. Brian Aldiss, whose work Kavan admired, praised it as the best science fiction novel of 1967. In 1968, a week after Kavan's death, Doubleday published Ice in the United States on the advice of Aldiss.

== Legacy ==
The British band Squid wrote the song "Peel St." on their 2021 album Bright Green Field as a tribute to Kavan, with its lyrics extensively referencing scenes in Ice; the title of the album comes from an earlier short story by Kavan.
