= Asylum Piece =

1940 short story collection by Anna Kavan

- Author: Anna Kavan
- Language: English
- Genre: Short story collection
- Publication date: 1940
- Publication place: United Kingdom
- Media type: Print (hardback)
- Pages: 206

Asylum Piece is a short story collection by Anna Kavan, and the first published under her pen name "Anna Kavan" instead of her married name, Helen Ferguson. Kavan sold three stories from the collection to Harper's Bazaar before the book was published. The collection of stories draws from Kavan's life and experiences in mental institutions, and uses figurative language to describe how different characters experience madness, abjection, and despair.

Anaïs Nin praised the book in her 1968 manifesto, The Novel of the Future, writing that:

Anna Kavan made a significant beginning as a nocturnal writer with House of Sleep and achieved this kind of revelation with a classic equal to the work of Kafka titled Asylum Pieces [sic] in which the nonrational human being caught in a web of unreality still struggles to maintain a dialogue with those who cannot understand him.

Nin also praised the book's ability to "[enter] the world of the divided self," along with Hermann Hesse's Steppenwolf and I'm Not Stiller by Max Frisch.

== List of stories ==
Story list is taken from the 1981 reprint by Peter Owen.

1. The Birthmark
2. Going Up in the World
3. The Enemy
4. A Changed Situation
5. The Birds
6. Airing a Grievance
7. Just Another Failure
8. The Summons
9. At Night
10. An Unpleasant Reminder
11. Machines in the Head
12. Asylum Piece I
13. Asylum Piece II
14. Asylum Piece III
15. Asylum Piece IV
16. Asylum Piece V
17. Asylum Piece VI
18. Asylum Piece VII
19. Asylum Piece VIII
20. The End in Sight
21. There Is No End
