= Feeling Very Strange: The Slipstream Anthology =

2006 anthology edited by James Patrick Kelly and John Kessel

- Cover of the first edition.
- Editors: James Patrick Kelly and John Kessel
- Cover artist: Isabelle Rozenbaum(image) & John D. Berry (designer)
- Language: English
- Genre: Slipstream
- Publisher: Tachyon
- Publication date: 2006
- Publication place: United States
- Media type: Print (Paperback)
- Pages: 288
- ISBN: 1-892391-35-X

Feeling Very Strange: The Slipstream Anthology is a 2006 anthology of slipstream fiction, edited by James Patrick Kelly and John Kessel, published in 2006 by Tachyon Publications.

== Contents ==
Feeling Very Strange seeks to define the slipstream genre as well as present the foremost examples of it. The editor's foreword consists primarily of attempts to define the genre, and the stories are interspersed with a series of essays and arguments from other authors and commentators, under the heading "I Want My 20th Century Schitzoid Art".

Title	Author
"Al"	Carol Emshwiller
"The Little Magic Shop "	Bruce Sterling
"The Specialist's Hat"	Kelly Link
"The Healer"	Aimee Bender
"Light and the Sufferer"	Jonathan Lethem
"Sea Oak"	George Saunders
"Exhibit H: Torn Pages Discovered in the Vest Pocket of an Unidentified Tourist"	Jeff VanderMeer
"Hell Is the Absence of God"	Ted Chiang
"Lieserl"	Karen Joy Fowler
"Bright Morning"	Jeffrey Ford
"Biographical Notes to 'A Discourse on the Nature of Causality, with Air-planes'"	Benjamin Rosenbaum
"The God of Dark Laughter"	Michael Chabon
"The Rose in Twelve Petals"	Theodora Goss
"The Lions Are Asleep this Night"	Howard Waldrop
"You Have Never Been Here"	M. Rickert

== Reception ==
Feeling Very Strange received mixed reviews, with most of the negative responses stating that they were unconvinced of the viability of slipstream as a legitimate subgenre. The review on The SF Site was particularly concerned with this element, stating that "stylistic variations among the selections don't help to clarify exactly what slipstream is." A review in Strange Horizons expressed further concern with the definition given, stating that "slipstream is not a genre (and) a slipstream anthology risks seeming arbitrary in its selections. Even if it's a form on its way to becoming a genre, "slipstream" can be seen as an imperialist coinage, a land-grab by the ghetto." It went on to note, however, that "the quality of the stories in this book, with a couple of exceptions...is not in doubt. Publishers Weekly made a similar proviso, stating that "While these intriguing stories (and accompanying essays) may not be enough to define the canon of a new subgenre, they provide plenty of good reading." Susurrus Magazine was less qualified in their praise, stating that "though it's hard to define exactly what is happening, it's a pleasure to read."
