= Slipstream fiction =

Genre of speculative fiction

Slipstream is a literary genre or category of speculative fiction that blends together science fiction, fantasy, and literary fiction, or otherwise does not remain within conventional boundaries of genre and narrative. It directly extends from the experimentation of the New Wave science fiction movement while also borrowing from fantasy, psychological fiction, philosophical fiction and other genres or styles of literature.

Historical examples of the genre were partially codified in Feeling Very Strange: The Slipstream Anthology. Contemporary examples include Peaces by Helen Oyeyemi, The Dangers of Smoking in Bed by Mariana Enríquez, and The Butterfly Lampshade by Aimee Bender.

== Origin ==
The term was coined by Richard Dorsett according to an interview with renowned cyberpunk author Bruce Sterling in Mythaxis Review. He said:

It was invented by my friend the late Richard Dorsett while the two of us were discussing a category of non-genre fantasy books that we had no name for. "They're certainly not mainstream," I said, and "Why not slipstream?" he suggested, and I thought it was a pretty good coinage.

Sterling later described it in an article originally published in SF Eye #5, in July 1989, as "a kind of writing which simply makes you feel very strange; the way that living in the twentieth century makes you feel, if you are a person of a certain sensibility." The Encyclopedia of Science Fiction credits Sterling with inventing the related term of "slipstream sf" for works that "make use of sf devices but which are not Genre SF".

Conversely, in her 2012 volume Walking the Clouds: An Anthology of Indigenous Science Fiction, the Anishinaabe scholar Grace L. Dillon identified a current of Native American slipstream that predates and anticipates the timeframe for slipstream, notably including Gerald Vizenor's 1978 short story "Custer on the Slipstream".

== Concept ==
Slipstream fiction has been described as "the fiction of strangeness", or a form of writing that makes "the familiar strange or the strange familiar" through skepticism about elements of reality. Illustrating this, prototypes of the style of slipstream are considered to exist in the stories of Franz Kafka and Jorge Luis Borges.

Science fiction authors James Patrick Kelly and John Kessel, editors of Feeling Very Strange: The Slipstream Anthology, argued cognitive dissonance is at the heart of slipstream, and it is not so much a genre as a literary effect, like horror or comedy. Similarly, Christopher Priest, in his introduction to Anna Kavan's genre-defying but arguably slipstream novel Ice, writes "the best way to understand slipstream is to think of it as a state of mind or a particular approach, one that is outside of all categorisation. ... slipstream induces a sense of 'otherness' in the audience, like a glimpse into a distorting mirror."

On account of its use by Vizenor and Dillon, however, the genre-term slipstream has become sufficiently associated with Indigenous-authored fiction in some circles that by 2022, Tarren Andrews could define slipstream as "a genre of Indigenous Sci-Fi writing that enacts temporal sovereignty in the past, present, and future".

== Characteristics ==
In slipstream, characteristics of works of fiction considered under the term include disruption of the principle of realism, avoidance of being a traditional fantasy story, and being a postmodern narrative. As an emerging genre, slipstream has been described as nonrealistic fiction with a postmodern sensibility, exploring an awareness of societal and technological change and psychological breakdown previously shown by science fiction authors during the time of postmodernism, as well as poets and experimental authors in modernism.

Other science fiction authors and fans claim "that slipstream is a term that lumps together metafiction, magical realism, surrealism, experimental fiction[,] counter-realism", and postmodern writing, and/or applies to a story with themes coming from one or more of these literary influences.

== See also ==
- Bizarro fiction
- List of genres
- Magic realism
- Weird fiction
  - New weird
- Science fiction
- Slipstream (magazine)
- Speculative fiction
- Surrealism
- Transrealism (literature)
