= Karain: A Memory =

1897 short story by Joseph Conrad

"Karain: A Memory" is a short story by the Polish-British author Joseph Conrad, first published in Blackwood's Magazine in 1897. It was later included in his 1898 collection Tales of Unrest.

== Background ==
The story was Conrad's first story commissioned for Blackwood's Magazine, popularly known as the Maga. It was based on the Polish folktale "Czaty" by Adam Mickiewicz.

== Plot ==
The story is told through a double frame narrative. An unnamed narrator encounters Karain, a haunted Malay chief, on a schooner. Karain recounts his past in the form of a story. The narrative centres on Karain's loyalty to his friend Pata Matara, who seeks to restore his family's honour by killing his sister, who eloped with a Dutch trader. Karain and Matara travel for many years, during which Karain is haunted by the sister's vision. Eventually they find the sister and Dutchman. Matara orders to Karain to shoot the Dutchman, while he kills his sister. But at the fatal moment, Karain kills Matara, saving the others' lives. Karain then states that he is haunted by the ghost of his dead friend. Karain asks the crew of the schooner to help him put an end to the haunting. One of the crew give him a gilded sixpence, telling him that it is a charm. Karain accepts the charm and believes that he has finally been exorcised. The story ends with a coda, in which the narrator and one of the crew meet in London, and reflect on the story they have been told.

== Significance ==
- Imperialism: "Karain" is one of Conrad's early published works, and the first to deal with British imperialism explicitly.

== Critical reception ==
David Finkelstein notes that "there is nothing in the piece to disturb the general tenor of Maga's presentation of Empire".

Christopher GoGwilt notes that while the story "contains all the ingredients of the imperial adventure tale" popularised by writers such as H. Rider Haggard, Conrad "ultimately produced a tale that turns its popular material against the assumptions of the genre". GoGwilt also states that Conrad's attempt to represent "native" Malay experience is a nearly unique feature of the text amongst Conrad's oeuvre.
