= Rayner Unwin =

English publisher (1925-2000)

Rayner Unwin with a copy of J. R. R. Tolkien's The Hobbit, which he, aged 10, recommended to his father, the publisher Sir Stanley Unwin

Rayner Stephens Unwin CBE (23 December 1925 – 23 November 2000) was an English publisher. He served as the chairman of the publishing firm George Allen & Unwin, which had been founded by his father Sir Stanley Unwin.

== Early life ==
Unwin was born in 1925 in Hampstead, London, one of four children from the marriage of publisher Stanley Unwin and Mary née Storr (1883–1971). His father was the founder of the publishing house George Allen & Unwin. As a young boy, Unwin served as a test reader for the firm, as his father believed that children were the best judges of what made good children's books. He was paid one shilling for each written report, which as Unwin later remarked was "good money in those days".

"Bilbo Baggins was a Hobbit who lived in his Hobbit hole and never went for adventures, at last Gandalf the wizard and his Dwarves persuaded him to go. He had a very ex[c]iting time fighting goblins and wargs. At last they got to the lonely mountain; Smaug, the dragon who guards it is killed and after a terrific battle with the goblins he returned home – rich!
This book, with the help of maps, does not need any illustrations it is good and should appeal to all children between the ages of 5 and 9."

— Unwin's review of The Hobbit.

Most notable among the reviews he wrote for his father was his 1936 report, aged 10, for the J. R. R. Tolkien book The Hobbit. "It wasn't a great piece of literary criticism," he later said of the report, "but in those happy days, no second opinion was needed; if I said it was good enough to publish, it was published." Allen & Unwin published The Hobbit in September 1937.

After attending Abbotsholme School in Rocester between the ages of 10 and 17, Unwin started working as a book salesman for Basil Blackwell, whose father was the founder of Blackwell's bookshop in Oxford. Between 1944 and 1947, he served in East Asia as a sub-lieutenant in the Royal Naval Volunteer Reserve. He then studied for an undergraduate degree at Trinity College, Oxford, before completing a master's degree in English at Harvard University, which he attended as a Fulbright scholar.

== Career ==
=== Allen and Unwin ===
Rayner Unwin entered publishing in 1951, working for his father's firm George Allen & Unwin, with a starting salary of £35 per week. He was offered the manuscript for The Lord of the Rings and thought that it ought to be published. Writing to his father with the figures, he said he thought they might lose a thousand pounds. Sir Stanley wrote back, saying "If you think this to be a work of genius, then you may lose a thousand pounds."

Unwin was also responsible for the first UK publication of the Roald Dahl children's books James and the Giant Peach and Charlie and the Chocolate Factory. Dahl had been struggling to find a publisher for these titles in the UK, but caught the attention of Unwin after Unwin's daughter Camilla became captivated by a copy of James and the Giant Peach that her schoolfriend Tessa Dahl (Roald's daughter) had given her.

When Sir Stanley died in 1968, Unwin became the new chairman of the firm. His father had been preparing him for the role during his time at the firm; Rayner's older brother David had decided to pursue a career as a children's author instead. David Unwin later wrote in his memoirs: "I have always felt guilty at my defection, for by taking my place Rayner sacrificed his own promising career as an author".

Initially, the firm enjoyed success under the chairmanship of Unwin. However, during the 1980s, the firm's comparatively small turnover of £8 million became a cause for concern. In 1986, George Allen & Unwin was merged with Bell and Hyman to form Unwin Hyman, with Unwin acting as chairman. In 1989, the new firm faced serious difficulties when managing director Robin Hyman became seriously ill at a time when the company's profits were declining rapidly. The company was acquired by HarperCollins in 1990, a decision to which Unwin was opposed. Before the contract was signed, Unwin resigned as a protest, and he remarked to his friends: "I feel I've betrayed my father."

=== Writing career ===
Unwin was also the writer or editor of several works, which were published in two periods. His first period of writing activity came during his first decade at Allen & Unwin. He was the editor of The Gulf of Years: Letters from John Ruskin to Kathleen Olander (1953). He produced a critical work on poetry entitled The Rural Muse (1954), which covered the work of poets such as John Clare, George Crabbe and Stephen Duck. This was followed by The Defeat of John Hawkins: A Biography of His Third Voyage (1960), a detailed account of the expedition made by 16th-century navigator John Hawkins to San Juan de Ulúa in Mexico. Initially published by George Allen & Unwin, it was later reissued by Pelican. Late in his life, Rayner wrote A Winter Away From Home (1995), a young-adult history book about Dutch explorer William Barents and his 16th-century voyages to the Arctic.

== Personal life ==
Unwin married Carol Margaret née Curwen (1924–2012) on 3 April 1952. Carol's father Harold also worked in the publishing trade, as the owner of the Curwen Press. The two families had known each other for a long time, as Stanley Unwin and Harold Curwen had attended Abbotsholme School together. Carol Curwen was working as a nurse at the time of their marriage.

Their first married home was a flat above the Museum Street offices of Allen & Unwin. They later moved to Limes Cottage, a Grade II listed property in the Buckinghamshire village of Little Missenden. They continued to live there until their deaths, in 2000 and 2012 respectively. Unwin served as chairman for the annual Little Missenden Music Festival between 1981 and 1988.

The Unwins had four children: three daughters and one son. His son Merlin also entered the publishing trade, initially working for George Allen & Unwin before setting up his own independent publishing company, Merlin Unwin Books, with a focus on countryside and fishing.

He was a member of the Garrick Club.

Unwin died of cancer on 23 November 2000 at the Hospice of St Francis in Berkhamsted, Hertfordshire. His cremated remains were taken by his daughter to the Himalayas and scattered there.

== The Unwin Charitable Trust ==
The Unwin Charitable Trust was established in 1975 by Rayner Unwin using a bequest from his father, Sir Stanley Unwin. It began by supporting the Book Trust and the Publishing Training Centre, relationships that continue to thrive, along with "many other good causes that benefit and promote publishing and the distribution of the printed word, schemes that encourage literacy and the enjoyment of reading".

The Trustees are Adrian Stephenson, Frances Pra-Lopez, and Merlin Spedding Unwin, son of Rayner. With support of the Booksellers Association, the Trust has a free mentoring programme for small, independent booksellers; Sheila O’Reilly has the role of mentor. Georgina Miller is the Trust's contact person. In 2017 the Trust had income of £244.7K.
