= The Declining Winter =

British band

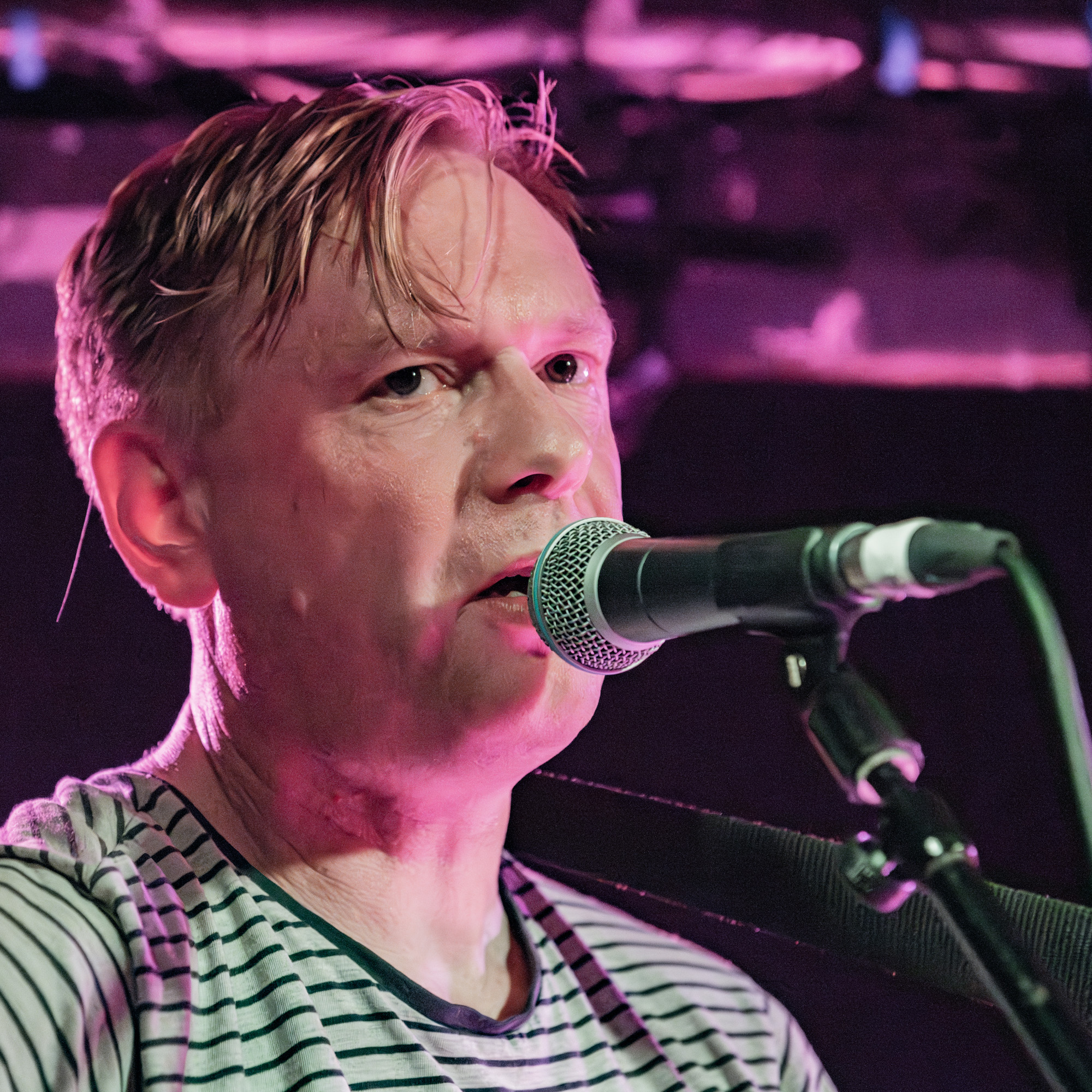
- Richard Adams, London, November 2023

Background information
- Origin: Leeds, England
- Genres: Post-rock, Indie, slowcore, IDM, shoegaze, electronic
- Years active: 2007–present
- Labels: Misplaced Music; Rusted Rail; Moteer; Home Assembly; Monopsone; Rural Colours; Sound in Silence
- Members: Richard Adams
- Past members: Stuart Wilson; Paul Elam; Gareth S. Brown; Richard Morris; Elaine Reynolds; Sarah Kemp
- Website: Thedecliningwinter.com

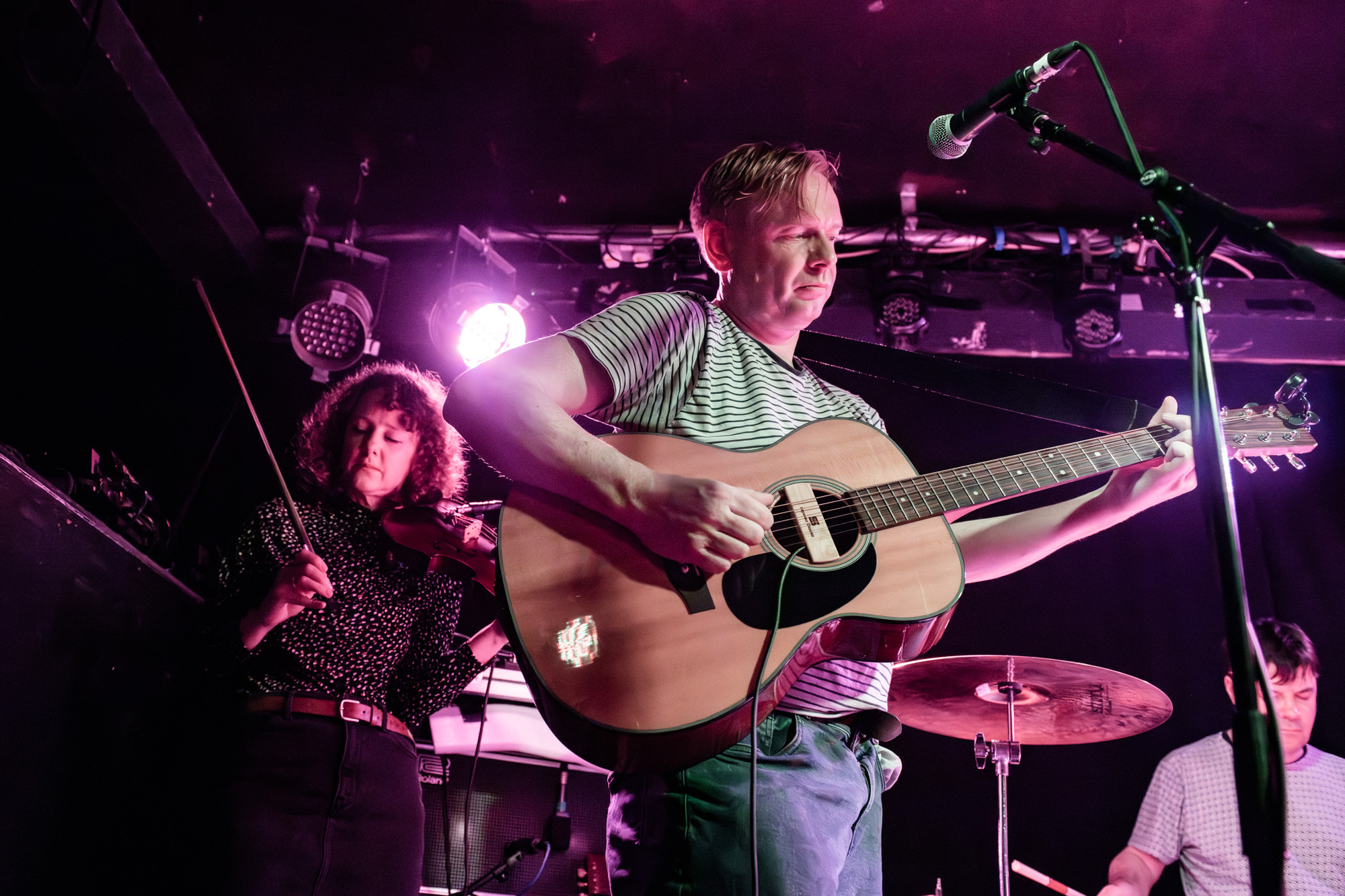
At The Waiting Room, London, 22 November 2023

The Declining Winter is a British band based in Yorkshire, led by Richard Adams, the co-founder of the Domino Records group Hood. The band plays a unique form of pastoral pop taking in influences from lo-fi, electronica and post rock with a strong visual aesthetic inspired by the countryside of Yorkshire.

They released their debut single "The Future Sound of Hip Hop Parts 1 & 2" on Misplaced Music in November 2007. This was followed up by a debut album Goodbye Minnesota released by Ireland's Rusted Rail imprint in May 2008. In May 2009, they issued a mini album Haunt the Upper Hallways on Home Assembly Music. The same label also released an unlikely attempt at a song for the 2010 World Cup.

After a long period of silence, the band (now consisting solely of Richard Adams with assorted guests) returned to release a 10" Fragment 5 on French label Monopsone in 2013 followed by Lost Songs cassette on Sanity Muffin in 2014. The latter album consists of unfinished recordings rescued by Adams from his crashed hard drive and was later issued as a small run of CDrs. A brand new studio album, Home For Lost Souls, was finally released in March 2015 on Home Assembly Music, quickly followed by The Leaves in the Lane a split 12" with Isnaj Dui and a limited album Endless Scenery.

The band once again fell silent as Adams worked with his other project the dulcimer-led instrumental band, Memory Drawings, until a critically appraised new studio album, Belmont Slope arrived in September 2018. In 2021 Adams released the entirely solo Recordings Of Weird Air cassette on his own Signal imprint consisting of songs recorded live to iPAD during lockdown. Later that same year the long delayed The Definition Glance 7" appeared on Spanish indie label Acuarela followed by another single I Remember - the lead track featuring the words of poet Thomas Hood.

Richard Adams has also released two albums of ambient and electronic recordings under the name Western Edges.

== Discography ==
=== Studio albums ===
- Goodbye Minnesota (2008)
- Haunt the Upper Hallways (2009)
- Fragment 5 (2013)
- Lost Songs (2014)
- Home For Lost Souls (2015)
- The Leaves in the Lane (2015) split album with Isnaj Dui
- Endless Scenery (2015)
- Belmont Slope (2018)
- Recordings Of Weird Air (2021)
- Really Early, Really Late (2023)

=== Singles ===
- "The Future Sound of Hip Hop Parts 1 & 2" (2007)
- "Moteer Remixes" (2007)
- "Remixes" (2008)
- "The Official World Cup Theme" (2010)
- "Scenes from The Back Bedroom Window" (2010)
- "Chimneys etc" (2018)
- "Return to Branch" (2018)
- "Why Clanks" (2019)
- "Occupying The Blanks" (2020)
- "The Definition Glance" (2021)
- "I Remember" (2021)
