= The Cornhill Magazine =

English literary magazine, 1860–1975

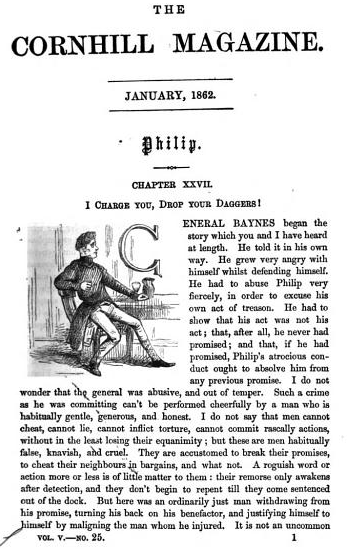
- Issue for January 1862
- Editor: William Makepeace Thackeray (1860–1862)
- Categories: Literary magazine
- Publisher: George Murray Smith
- First issue: 1859
- Final issue: 1975
- Company: Smith, Elder & Co.; John Murray (from 1917)
- Country: United Kingdom
- Based in: London
- Language: English

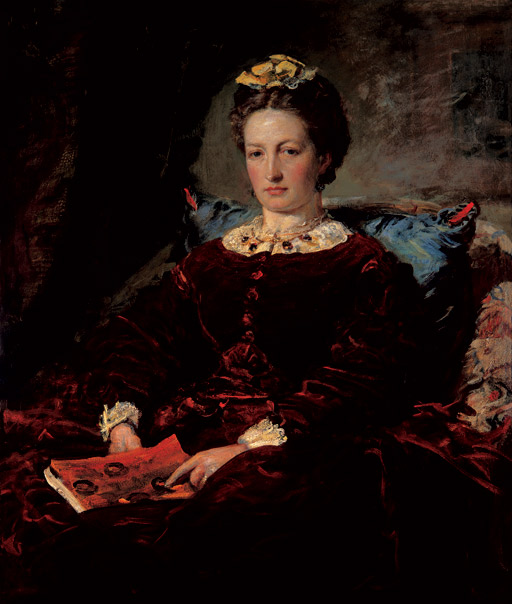
Portrait of Effie Millais by John Everett Millais, 1873. She is shown holding a copy of The Cornhill Magazine

The Cornhill Magazine (1860–1975) was a monthly Victorian magazine and literary journal named after the street address of the founding publisher Smith, Elder & Co. at 65 Cornhill in London. In the 1860s, under the editorship of William Makepeace Thackeray, the paper's large circulation peaked around 110,000. Due to emerging competitors, circulation fell to 20,000 by 1870. The following year, Leslie Stephen took over as editor. When Stephen left in 1882, circulation had further fallen to 12,000. The Cornhill was purchased by John Murray in 1912, and continued to publish issues until 1975.

== History ==
The Cornhill was founded by George Murray Smith in 1859, and the first issue displayed the cover date January 1860. A literary journal with articles on diverse subjects and serialisations of new novels, it continued until 1975.

In 1864, the magazine published John Young Stratton’s “The Life of a Farm Labourer”, an article criticising the English Poor Law and its demoralising impact on rural labouring life.

Smith had hoped to gain some of the readership enjoyed by All the Year Round, a similar magazine owned by Charles Dickens; toward this end, he employed as editor William Thackeray, Dickens's great literary rival at the time. Subsequent editors included G. H. Lewes, Leslie Stephen, Ronald Gorell Barnes, James Payn, Peter Quennell and Leonard Huxley.

The magazine was initially successful, selling more issues than expected, but within a few years circulation dropped rapidly as it failed to keep pace with changes in popular taste. It also gained a reputation for rather safe, inoffensive content in the late Victorian era. A mark of the high regard in which it had been held was its publication of Leaves from the Journal of Our Life in the Highlands by Queen Victoria. Stories were often illustrated by pre-eminent artists of the time, including George du Maurier, Edwin Landseer, Frederic Leighton and John Everett Millais.

From 1917 the magazine was published by John Murray of Albemarle Street, London. Contributors to The Cornhill in the 1930s and 1940s included Elizabeth Bowen, Rose Macaulay, Mary Webb, D. K. Broster and Nugent Barker.

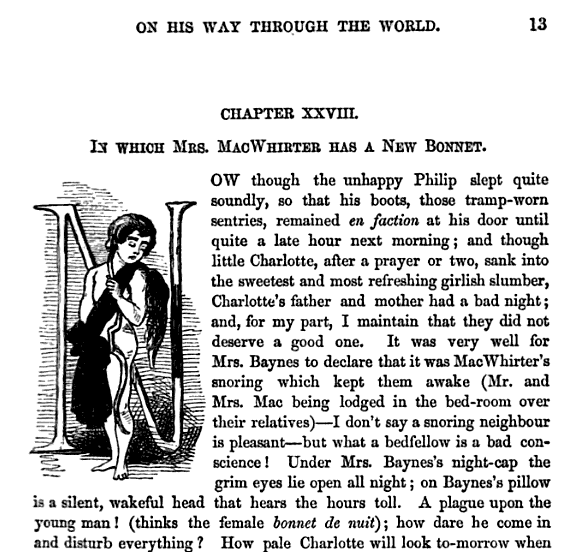
Detail from issue for January 1862

== Notable works published ==
Important works serialised in the magazine include the following:

- Framley Parsonage by Anthony Trollope
- Wives and Daughters by Elizabeth Gaskell
- The White Company and J. Habakuk Jephson's Statement by Arthur Conan Doyle
- Tithonus by Alfred Tennyson
- Washington Square by Henry James
- Culture and Anarchy by Matthew Arnold
- Romola by George Eliot
- "The Lagoon" by Joseph Conrad
- Far from the Madding Crowd by Thomas Hardy
- Unto This Last by John Ruskin
- Armadale by Wilkie Collins
- Emma (Posthumous Fragment) by Charlotte Brontë
- Daisy Miller by Henry James

== Archives ==
A list of issues of the magazine available for viewing online is provided by John Mark Ockerbloom through a webserver of the University of Pennsylvania: https://onlinebooks.library.upenn.edu/webbin/serial?id=cornhill

There are transcriptions of many issues available on Project Gutenberg.
