= Cosmopolis (magazine) =

1896–1898 literary magazine

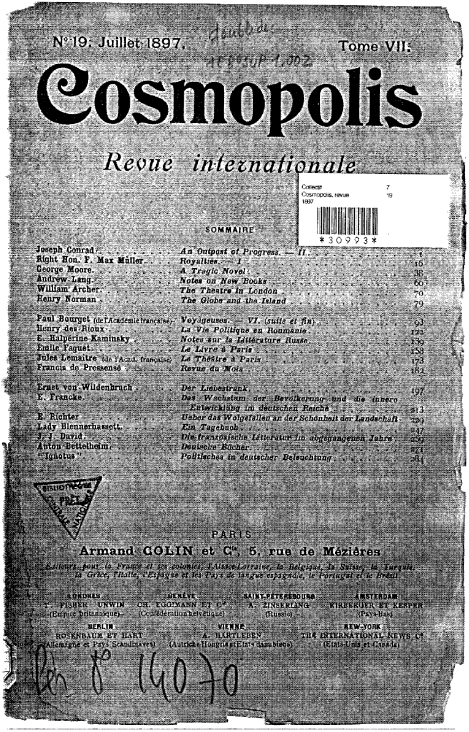
Cosmopolis (magazine)

Cosmopolis: An International Monthly Review was a multi-lingual literary magazine published between January 1896 and November 1898. The lead edition of Cosmopolis was published in London, but local editions of the magazine were also published in Berlin, Paris, and Saint Petersburg.

Each edition of Cosmopolis contained non-fiction articles, literary reviews, and new fiction in English, French, and German; later editions also contained material in Russian.

Cosmopolis was edited by Fernand Ortmans and was published in London by T. Fisher Unwin. It had a circulation of approximately 20,000.

== Fictional namesake ==
Jack Vance's Demon Princes novels have occasional reference to a magazine called Cosmopolis (no subtitle) that is bought by the lead character.
