= Peter Owen Publishers =

Publisher

- Founded: 1951
- Founder: Peter Owen
- Country of origin: United Kingdom
- Headquarters location: London
- Distribution: Combined Book Services (UK); NewSouth Books (Australia); Independent Publishers Group (US)
- Publication types: Books
- Official website: peterowen.com

Peter Owen Publishers was founded in 1951 as a family-run independent publisher based in London, England. The company was acquired by Pushkin Press in 2022.

== History ==
The company was founded in 1951 by Peter Owen, who had previously worked for Stanley Unwin at The Bodley Head. Owen's first editor was Muriel Spark, who would later write a novel called A Far Cry From Kensington drawing on her experiences working there.

Their published authors include Paul Bowles and Jane Bowles, the Japanese Catholic author Shusaku Endo, the Spanish writers Julio Llamazares, José Ovejero, Cristina Fernández Cubas, Antonio Soler and Salvador Dalí, as well as André Gide, Jean Cocteau, Colette, Anna Kavan, Anaïs Nin, Natsume Sōseki, Yukio Mishima, Ariyoshi Sawako, Gertrude Stein, Hermann Hesse, Karoline Leach, the revisionist biographer of Lewis Carroll, Hans Henny Jahnn, Tarjei Vesaas and Miranda Miller. The press has published seven Nobel Prize winners. Although best known for fiction, especially in translation, the company also publishes plenty of non-fiction.

In 1991, Owen compiled an anthology to commemorate forty years of publishing, The Peter Owen Anthology: Forty Years of Independent Publishing. Remaining independent since its founding, his press continues to publish. The company records are held in Special Collections at the University of Delaware.
