= Sleep Has His House (novel) =

Novel by Anna Kavan

First edition (cover art by Bill English)

Sleep Has His House (first published as The House of Sleep in New York by Doubleday in 1947) is a novel by Anna Kavan. The novel is a dark coming of age narrative, which juxtaposes realistic semi-autobiographical accounting of life, with sections of subconscious wanderings.

According to critic Kate Zambreno, the novel was neither a popular nor critical success, leading to the publisher Jonathan Cape dropping her as one of their authors. Kirkus Review, when reviewing a 1980 reprint of the novel, called its style as having a "dreamlike quality--often beautiful but generally less effective [than her earlier work]".

== See also ==
- Ice, a later novel by Kavan
