= Peter Owen (publisher) =

British publisher (1927–2016)

Peter Owen OBE
- Born: Peter Offenstadt; 24 February 1927; Nuremberg, Germany
- Died: 31 May 2016 (aged 89); London, England
- Occupation: Publisher

Peter Lothar Owen OBE (24 February 1927 – 31 May 2016) was a British publisher, the founder of Peter Owen Publishers.

== Biography ==
He was born Peter Offenstadt in Nuremberg in 1927, with rickets, the only child of a German Jewish couple. His mother was Winifred Offenstadt.

At the age of five he was sent to live with his grandmother in England where he was later joined by his parents, who were reluctant to leave Germany. Naturalised as British subjects in 1946, he and his father took the name Owen in 1948.

In 1948, after working as an apprentice for various publishers, including for a short time with John Rodker at Imago, Owen went into partnership with Neville Armstrong in a publishing enterprise called Peter Neville. He was 21 years old. The company lasted until 1955. He founded Peter Owen Publishers in 1951, initially publishing many books in translation, and continued to run the firm until 2015 when he handed over to his daughter, Antonia Owen (long-time editorial director) and son-in-law Nick Kent.

The publisher was later acquired by Pushkin Press.

He was awarded the OBE for services to literature in 2014.

Owen left instructions that his funeral include "no religious crap of any kind".
