= T. Fisher Unwin =

British publishing company

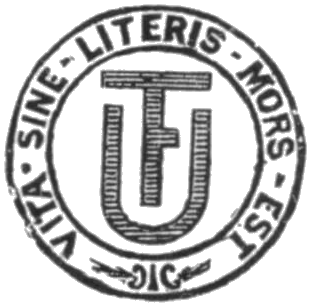
- Status: Defunct
- Founded: 1882
- Founder: Thomas Fisher Unwin
- Successor: Ernest Benn Limited
- Country of origin: United Kingdom
- Publication types: Books

T. Fisher Unwin was the London publishing house founded by Thomas Fisher Unwin, husband of British Liberal politician Jane Cobden in 1882.

Unwin fashioned a "highly competitive company with a reputation for discovering and marketing promising new authors". The company published fiction series such as the Pseudonym Library and the Overseas Library through which promising new authors such as Joseph Conrad, John Galsworthy and W. Somerset Maugham could be "profitably marketed to a growing middle-class reading public" in the 1890s. In the years 1895-1898 Unwin published Joseph Conrad’s first novel Almayer’s Folly and his An Outcast of the Islands and Tales of Unrest; in 1897 it published Maugham's first novel Liza of Lambeth.

The company's list also included works by Henrik Ibsen, Friedrich Nietzsche, H. G. Wells, Olive Schreiner, W. B. Yeats, Ford Madox Ford, Sigmund Freud, Ouida and E. Nesbit.

T. Fisher Unwin employed a "skilful team" including Edward Garnett as reader (who recommended Almayer’s Folly for publication) and David Rice as chief salesman.

During much of the company's first two decades T. Fisher Unwin's office was located at Paternoster Square, London and in 1905 it relocated to 1 Adelphi Square, London (with a branch at Inselstrasse 20, Leipzig).

Thomas Fisher Unwin's latterly more famous nephew Stanley Unwin started his career by working in his uncle's firm. Stanley Unwin purchased a controlling interest in the firm George Allen and Sons, and in 1914 established George Allen and Unwin, later to become Allen and Unwin.

Unwin retired to his home in Sussex in 1926, following which his publishing house merged with Ernest Benn Limited.

== Book series ==
- The Adelphi Library
- The Adventure Series
- The American State Series
- The Anglo-Italian Library
- Army Examination Series
- The Autonym Library
- Builders of Greater Britain
- Baedeker's Guide Books
- The Cameo Series
- The Century Library
- The Chats Series: Practical Handbooks for Collectors
- The Children's Library
- The Children's Study
- Conway and Coolidge's Climbers' Guides
- The Criminology Series
- Every Irishman's Library
- The First Novel Library (1902- )
- Half-Holiday Handbooks
- The How To Series of Practical Handbooks
- The Idle Hour Series
- Independent Novels
- Library of Irish Literature
- The Library of Literary History
- Little Novels
- Lives Worth Living: Series of Popular Biographies
- Masters of Medicine
- The Mermaid Series
- The Mind of the Century
- The Modern Travel Series
- The New Irish Library
- The Over-seas Library (commonly referred to as: The Overseas Library)
- The Pseudonym Library (1891–1903, 56 volumes)
- The Reformer's Bookshelf
- Six Shilling Novels
- The South American Series
- The Sports Library
- The Story of the Nations Library
- Unwin's Cabinet Library
- Unwin's Colonial Library
- Unwin's Green Cloth Library
- Unwin's Half-Crown Standard Library of History and Biography
- Unwin's Nature Books
- Unwin's Popular Series for Boys and Girls
- Unwin's Red Cloth Library
- Unwin's Shilling Novels
- Unwin's Sixpenny Editions
- Unwin's Theological Library
- The Welsh Library
- Yellow Library
