= Stanley Unwin (publisher) =

British publisher (1884–1968)

Sir Stanley Unwin KCMG
- Portrait by Walter Stoneman, 1946.
- Born: Stanley Unwin; 19 December 1884; Lee, Lewisham, England, United Kingdom
- Died: 13 October 1968 (aged 83); London, England, United Kingdom
- Burial place: Golders Green Crematorium
- Occupation: Publisher
- Known for: Founder of Allen & Unwin
- Spouse: Alice Mary Storr (m. 1914–1968)
- Children: Elizabeth Spicer Unwin (1916–1916); David Severn (1918–2010); Ruth Severn Unwin (1920–1998); Rayner Unwin (1925–2000)
- Relatives: Thomas Fisher Unwin (step-uncle); Ursula Moray Williams (niece)
- Awards: Order of the White Lion (1937); Order of St Michael and St George (1966)

Sir Stanley Unwin, KCMG (19 December 1884 – 13 October 1968) was a British publisher, who founded the Allen & Unwin publishing firm.

== Career ==
Unwin started his career at the publishing firm of his step-uncle Thomas Fisher Unwin. In 1914, Stanley Unwin purchased a controlling interest in the firm George Allen and Sons, and established George Allen & Unwin, later to become Allen and Unwin.

The company found success publishing authors such as Bertrand Russell, Sidney Webb, R. H. Tawney and Mahatma Gandhi.

In the 1930s, Unwin published two bestsellers by Lancelot Hogben: Mathematics for the Million and Science for the Citizen.

In 1936, J. R. R. Tolkien submitted The Hobbit for publication and Unwin paid his ten-year-old son Rayner Unwin a shilling to write a report on the manuscript. Rayner's favourable response prompted Unwin to publish the book. Once the book became a success, Unwin asked Tolkien for a sequel, which eventually became the bestselling The Lord of the Rings. Tolkien had wanted to publish The Silmarillion, but it was turned down for being "too Celtic"; it was finally published after his death by Allen & Unwin in 1977.

In 1950, Unwin published another bestseller, Thor Heyerdahl's The Kon-Tiki Expedition.

During his career Unwin was active in book trade organs such as the Publishers Association, the International Publishers Association and the British Council.

== Personal life ==
Stanley Unwin was born on 19 December 1884 at 13 Handen Road, Lee, Lewisham, south-east London. His father was Edward Unwin (1840–1933) and his mother was Elizabeth Unwin (née Spicer). Edward Unwin was a printer whose father, Jacob Unwin, was the founder of the printing firm Unwin Brothers.

The publisher Thomas Fisher Unwin was his father's youngest stepbrother, therefore Stanley Unwin's step-uncle. The children's author Ursula Moray Williams was his niece.

Unwin was a lifelong pacifist, and during the First World War, as a conscientious objector, he joined the Voluntary Aid Detachment (VAD).

Unwin died on 13 October 1968 and was honoured with a blue plaque at his birthplace.

== Gallery ==
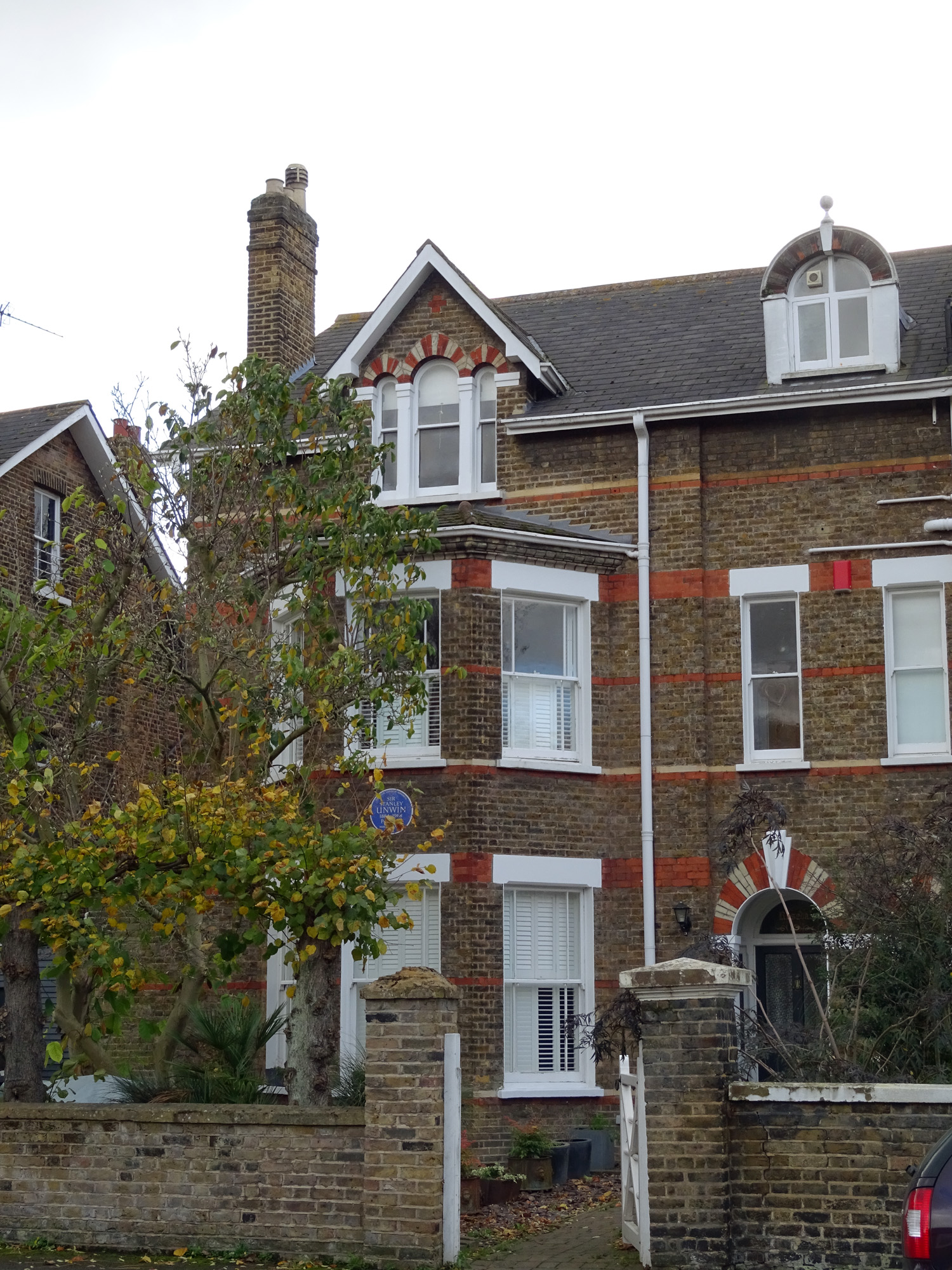
His birthplace in Handen Road, Lewisham

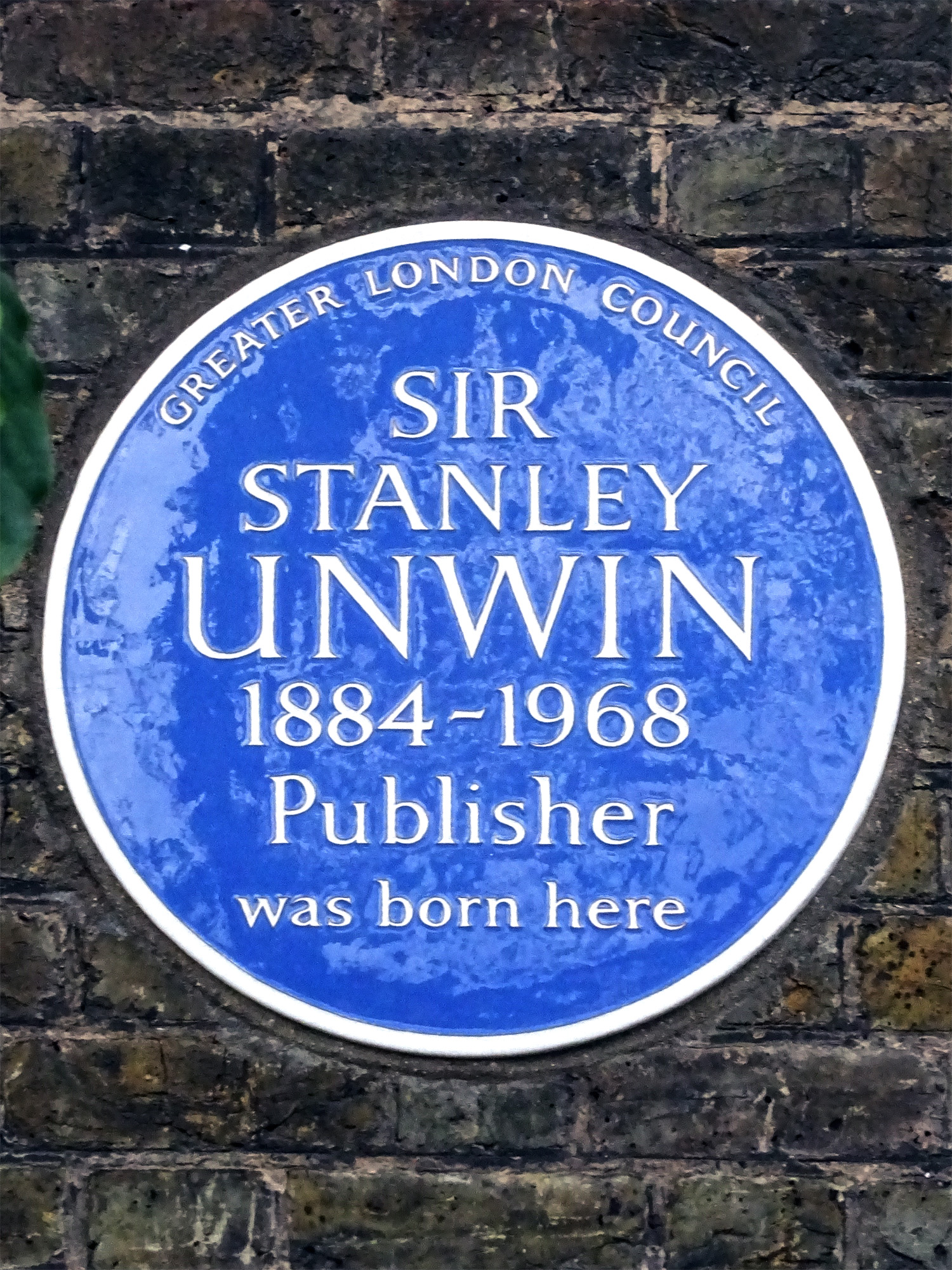
Blue Plaque on his birthplace.

== Bibliography ==
- The Price of Books (London: George Allen & Unwin, 1925)
- The Truth About Publishing (London: George Allen & Unwin, 1926; 8th revised edition, Allen & Unwin, 1976)
- Book Trade Organisation in Norway and Sweden (1932)
- The Book in the Making (London: George Allen & Unwin, 1933)
- Two Young Men See the World (London: George Allen & Unwin, 1934). Joint author: Severn Storr.
- The Danish Book Trade Organisation (London: George Allen & Unwin, 1937)
- Best-sellers: Are They Born or Made? (London: George Allen & Unwin, 1939). Joint authors: George Stevens and Frank Swinnerton.
- Publishing in Peace and War (London : George Allen & Unwin, 1944)
- On Translations (London: George Allen & Unwin, 1946)
- How Governments Treat Books (London: George Allen & Unwin, 1950)
- The Truth About a Publisher: An Autobiographical Record (New York: Macmillan, 1960)
- Fifty Years with Father: A Relationship (London: George Allen & Unwin, 1982)
