= Albert J. Guerard =

American novelist

Albert Joseph Guerard (1914–2000) was an American critic, novelist, and professor. He was born in Houston, Texas, and educated at Stanford University, (B.A. 1934), (Ph.D. 1938) and Harvard University, (M.A. 1936).

== Life ==
Guerard was born in Houston in 1914. He earned a bachelor's degree in 1934 from Stanford and a master's from Harvard in 1936. He taught for a year at Amherst College before earning his doctorate from Stanford in 1938. He taught at Harvard from 1938 to 1961, where his students included Alice Adams, John Hawkes, Alison Lurie, and Robert Crichton. He served in the Army from 1943 to 1945 as a Technical Sergeant in the psychological warfare branch.

He moved to Stanford in 1961 where he launched the university's first freshman seminar program, which ran for 13 years. As many as 400 students were involved in it annually. He also worked to get funding for the Voice Project, a program that brought professional writers to campus to teach freshmen. He succeeded Yvor Winters in the literature chair named after Guerard's father, Albert Léon Guérard, who was also a professor at Stanford for many years. He remained at Stanford until 1985. His students included writers John Hawkes, Frank O'Hara and Harriet Doerr. His interest in modernism and postmodernism led him to develop Stanford's interdisciplinary doctoral program in "Modern Thought and Literature", which still exists.

After suffering from emphysema for many years, he died in the same room where his father had died 41 years before.

== Work & awards ==
Guerard published nine novels, six books of criticism and a memoir called The Touch of Time: Myth, Memory and the Self, as well as a number of critical essays. He was preparing to submit a volume of some of his critical writing for publication when he died.

His novels include Night Journey, which drew from his experience in psychological warfare intelligence during World War II.

His critical books include The Triumph of the Novel: Dickens, Dostoevsky and Faulkner, which looks at three authors who broke away from realism.

He held the record for the most novels written by any living U.S. critic and the most critical books of any living American novelist.

In 1956, he was named a Guggenheim fellow.

In 1964, Guerard received an Academy Award in Literature from the American Academy of Arts and Letters.

He received a 1977-78 Humanities and Sciences Dean's Award for distinguished teaching and a 1983 Walter J. Gores Award for excellence in teaching.

== Publications ==
=== Novels ===
- The Past Must Alter. London, Longman, 1937; New York, Holt, 1938.
- The Hunted. New York, Knopf, 1944; London, Longman, 1947.
- Maquisard: A Christmas Tale. New York, Knopf, 1945; London, Longman, 1946.
- Night Journey. New York, Knopf, 1950; London, Longman, 1951.
- The Bystander. Boston, Little Brown, 1958; London, Faber, 1959.
- The Exiles. London, Faber, 1962; New York, Macmillan, 1963.
- Christine/Annette. New York, Dutton, 1985.
- Gabrielle: An Entertainment. New York, Fine, 1992.
- The Hotel in the Jungle. Dallas. Baskerville Publishers. 1995.
- Maquisard: A Christmas Tale. Novato, California, Lyford Books, 1995.

=== Short stories ===
- Suspended Sentences. Santa Barbara, California, John Daniel, 1999.
- Uncollected Short Stories
- "Davos in Winter," in Hound and Horn (Cambridge, Massachusetts), October–December 1933.
- "Tragic Autumn," in The Magazine (Beverly Hills, California), December 1933.
- "Miss Prindle's Lover," in The Magazine (Beverly Hills, California), February 1934; revised edition, in Wake (Cambridge, Massachusetts), Spring 1948.
- "Turista," in The Best American Short Stories of 1947, edited by Martha Foley. Boston, Houghton Mifflin, 1947.
- "The Incubus," in The Dial (New York), vol. 1, no. 2, 1960.
- "The Lusts and Gratifications of Andrada," in Paris Review, Summer-Fall 1962.
- "On the Operating Table," in Denver Quarterly, Autumn 1966.
- "The Journey," in Partisan Review (New Brunswick, New Jersey), Winter 1967.
- "The Rabbit and the Tapes," in Sewanee Review (Tennessee), Spring1972.
- "The Pillars of Hercules," in Fiction (New York), December 1973.
- "Bon Papa Reviendra," in Tri-Quarterly (Evanston, Illinois), Spring1975.
- "Post Mortem: The Garcia Incident," in Southern Review (Baton Rouge, Louisiana), Spring 1978.
- "Diplomatic Immunity," in Sequoia (Stanford, California), Autumn-Winter, 1978.
- "The Poetry of Flight," in Northwest Magazine (Portland, Oregon), 22 January 1984.
- "The Mongol Orbit," in Sequoia (Stanford, California), Centennial Issue, 1989.

=== Criticism ===
- Robert Bridges: A Study of Traditionalism in Poetry. Cambridge, Massachusetts, Harvard University Press, and London, Oxford University Press, 1942.
- Joseph Conrad. New York, New Directions, 1947.
- Thomas Hardy: The Novels and Stories. Cambridge, Massachusetts, Harvard University Press, 1949; London, Oxford University Press, 1950; revised edition, 1964.
- André Gide. Cambridge, Massachusetts, Harvard University Press, and London, Oxford University Press, 1951; revised edition, 1969.
- Conrad the Novelist. Cambridge, Massachusetts, Harvard University Press, 1958; London, Oxford University Press, 1959.
- The Triumph of the Novel: Dickens, Dostoevsky, Faulkner. New York, Oxford University Press, 1976; London, Oxford University Press, 1977.
- The Touch of Time: Myth, Memory, and the Self. Stanford, California, Stanford Alumni Association, 1980.
- Editor, Prosateurs Américains de XXe Siécle. Paris, Laffont, 1947.
- Editor, The Return of the Native, by Thomas Hardy. New York, HoltRinehart, 1961.
- Editor, Hardy: A Collection of Critical Essays. Englewood Cliffs, New Jersey, Prentice Hall, 1963.
- Editor, Perspective on the Novel, special issue of Daedalus (Boston), Spring 1963.
- Co-Editor, The Personal Voice: A Contemporary Prose Reader. Philadelphia, Lippincott, 1964.
- Editor, Stories of the Double. Philadelphia, Lippincott, 1967.
- Editor, Mirror and Mirage. Stanford, California, Stanford Alumni Association, 1980.
