= ATelecine =

American industrial band

aTelecine
- Genres: Industrial • experimental music • electronica • drone • noise • post-punk • darkwave • dark ambient • minimal wave
- Years active: 2008–present
- Labels: Dais Records, Pendu Sound
- Spinoffs: Das Kosmischen Orchestra, Impacted Feces
- Members: Ian Cinnamon; Ništa Nil Nada
- Past members: Sasha Grey; Pablo St. Francis; Anthony D'Juan; Sveio
- Website: www.myspace.com/atelecine

aTelecine is an American industrial band featuring Ian Cinnamon and Ništa Nil Nada. The band was co-founded by actress Sasha Grey.

They released their first EP aVigillant Carpark in 2009 in 7 inch vinyl only. Their debut album The Falcon and the Pod was released on August 9, 2011. aTelecine's first live concert took place in Kraków during Unsound Festival on October 20, 2012.

Grey left the band in 2013, although she is credited with vocals on two songs on the 2014 release Der Baum Der Bosen. As of 2021 the band's most recent release is 2017's Anonymous Holes LP, which credits Ian Preston Cinnamon as the sole member.

== History ==
In 2008, Sasha Grey began an industrial music collaboration with Pablo St. Francis. They later added Anthony D' Juan and Ian Cinnamon. The project's first EP, aVigillant Carpark was released in 2009 by Pendu Sound on 7-inch vinyl. Grey also contributed vocals to the Current 93 album Aleph at Hallucinatory Mountain.

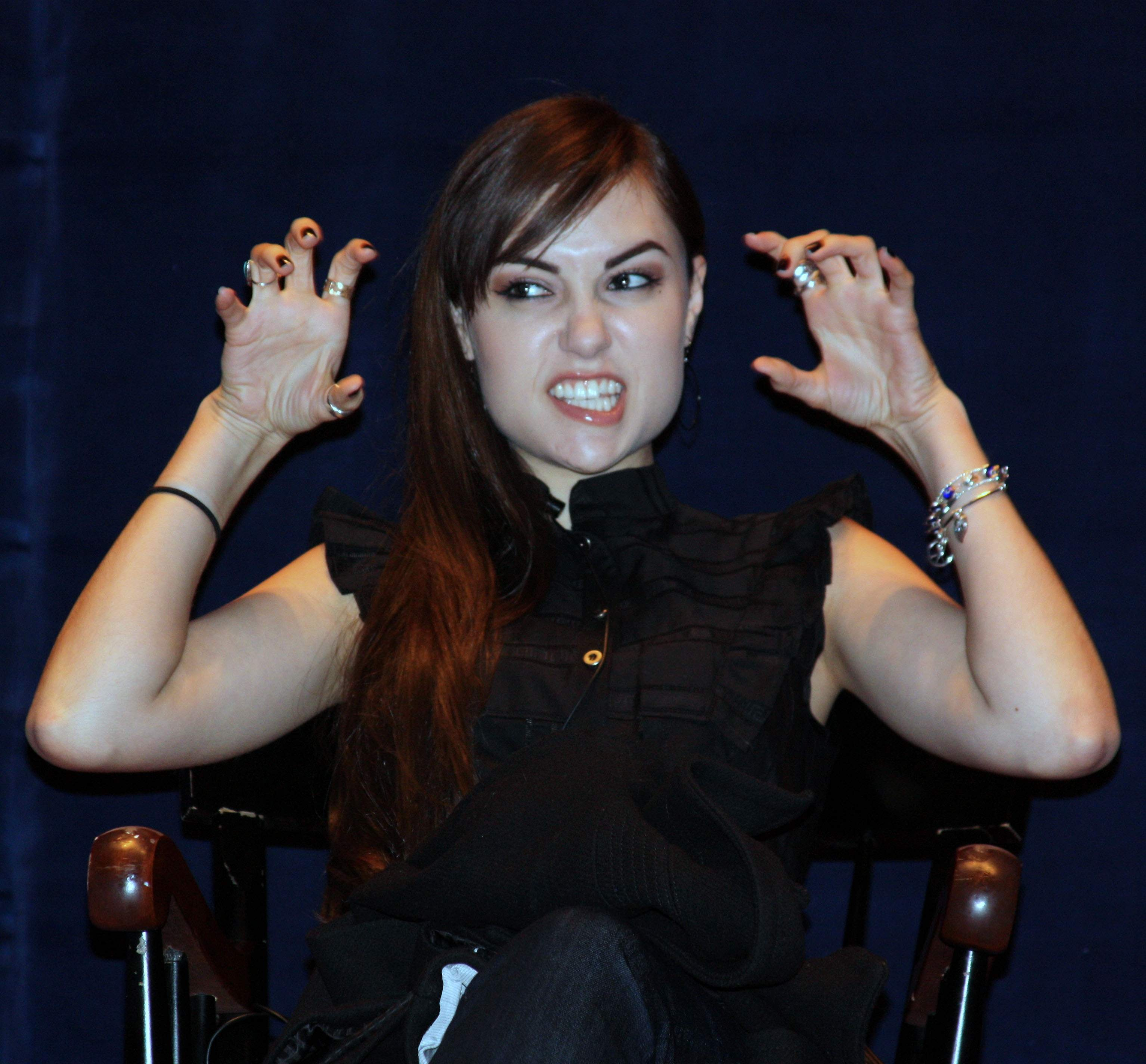
L.A. interview in July 2012

In 2010, aTelecine released its first LP, ...And Six Dark Hours Pass, and followed it up with the first of three A Cassette Tape Culture compilations. Grey described aTelecine as "experimental noise", The Village Voice suggested it is electronic / ambient / minimal, and Todd "Pendu" Brooks called it dark ambient and death-dub. In 2011, aTelecine's first full-length album, The Falcon and the Pod, was released. Paul Maher Jr. compared Sasha Grey with Cathy Ames in John Steinbeck's novel East of Eden, described the ambient tracks of aTelecine as aural wrecking balls, stated that Grey's artistic temperament comes close to that of the Marquis de Sade as "a proponent of freedom tethered to its furthest extremities, yet untethered by laws, morality or religion", but admired her courage and audaciousness.

In 2012, Grey covered Nico for the X-TG album Desertshore. The first live concert of aTelecine took place on October 20, 2012, in Kraków at the Unsound Festival.

In July 2013, Sasha Grey announced her departure from the group. Ian Cinnamon and a new vocalist, Sveio, were the only remaining full-time members.

== Members ==
Current members

- Ian Cinnamon – vocals, guitar, bass, drums, synthesizers, programming, melodica, tape loops, production (2008–present)
- Ništa Nil Nada – vocals, production (2020–present)

Former members

- Sveio – vocals, guitar, synthesizers (2013–2017)
- Sasha Grey – vocals, synthesizers, drums, drumbox, tape loops, guitar, bass (2008–2013)
- Anthony Djuan – vocals, synthesizers, tape loops, programming (2008–2013)
- Pablo St. Francis – vocals, programming, bass, drums, dulcimer, melodica, tape loops, production (2008–2017)

== Discography ==
=== Studio albums ===
- The Falcon and the Pod (2011)
- Sounds That Gods Fear (2012)
- Entkopplung (Dais Records, 2012)
- The Origin of the Obsolete Robot (2013)
- The Inverse Of Square (Soundtrack) (2014)
- The Burden Of Memory (Soundtrack) (2015)
- Anonymous Holes (2017)
- Analog Sounds For Unknown Films (2021)
- I Remember Halloween (2023)

=== EPs ===
- aVigillant Carpark (2009)
- Der Baum Der Bosen E.P. (2014)
- Second Secrets E.P. (2014)
- Shadow Sides E.P. (2015)
- Inside The Post! E.P. (2017)
- A3 - 21 E.P. (2017)

=== LPs ===
- A Cassette Tape Culture (Phase One) (2010)
- ...And Six Dark Hours Pass (Dais Records, 2010)
- A Cassette Tape Culture (Phase Two) (2011)
- A Cassette Tape Culture (Phase Three) (2011)
