= Sasha Grey =

American actress, musician, and writer (born 1988)

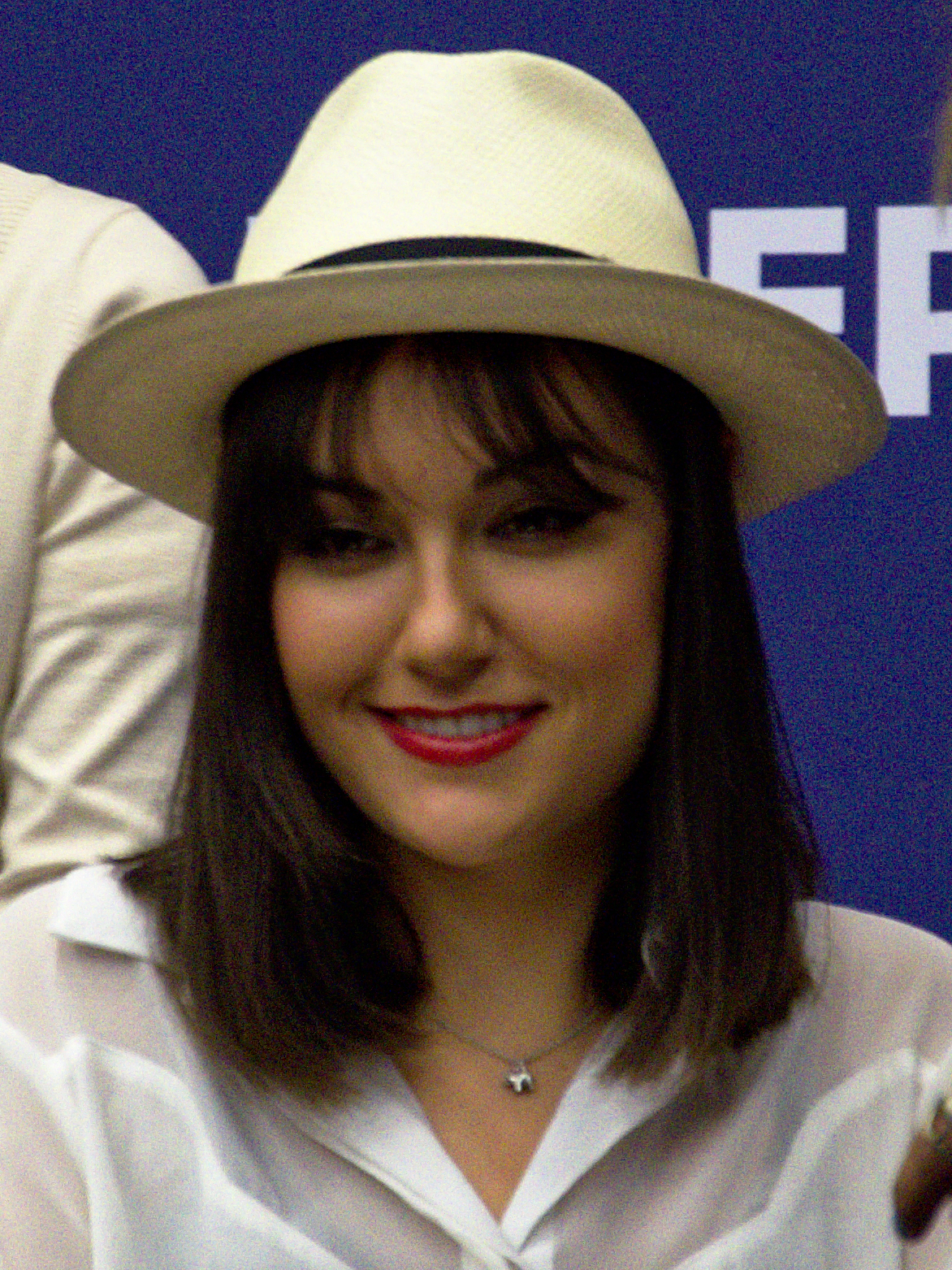
- Grey in 2013
- Born: Marina Ann Hantzis; 1988 (age 37–38); North Highlands, California, U.S.
- Other names: Anna Karina; Sasha Gray
- Education: Sacramento City College
- Occupations: Pornographic actress; streamer; model; author; DJ; musician
- Years active: 2006–present
- Known for: Pornographic films
- Notable work: The Girlfriend Experience; The Juliette Society

Twitch information
- Channel: sashagrey
- Followers: 1.2 million
- Last updated: October 28, 2026
- Website: sashagrey.com

Marina Ann Hantzis (born 1988), known professionally as Sasha Grey, is an American actress, model, writer, musician, and former pornographic film actress. She began her acting career in the pornographic film industry, winning 15 awards for her work between 2007 and 2010, including the AVN Award for Female Performer of the Year in 2008. In 2023, she was inducted into the AVN Hall of Fame and the XRCO Hall of Fame.

After her 2009 feature film debut as the lead in Steven Soderbergh's The Girlfriend Experience, Grey starred in independent films including Open Windows, the Canadian black comedy horror film Smash Cut and the horror film Would You Rather. In 2011, she played a fictionalized version of herself in the HBO comedy-drama series Entourage.

Grey was a co-founder, singer, and writer of aTelecine, an industrial music band. She is the author of The Juliette Society trilogy of novels and also writes, directs, and co-produces films and music videos.

== Early life ==
Grey was born in North Highlands, California, and grew up in Sacramento, in a working-class family. Grey's parents divorced before she started middle school and she was subsequently raised by her mother, who remarried in 2000. She was raised as a Catholic.

Grey attended four high schools, including Highlands High in North Highlands. She graduated a year early at the age of 17, and in late 2005, she attended Sacramento City College and took classes in film, dance, and acting. She bussed tables at a Black Angus Steakhouse until March 2006 and saved $7,000 for a move to Los Angeles.

== Career ==
=== Pornographic films ===
Having researched the adult industry since August 2005, Grey made her hardcore pornography debut shortly after her 18th birthday in 2006. She initially considered calling herself Anna Karina, after the French New Wave actress of the same name. She has said the name Sasha Grey was inspired by singer Sascha Konietzko of the band KMFDM and Oscar Wilde's novel The Picture of Dorian Gray, as well as the Kinsey scale, which grades sexual orientation as shades of grey between purely heterosexual and homosexual.

Less than six months after entering the adult industry, Grey was featured in the November 2006 edition of Los Angeles magazine where she was flagged as a potential major star, perhaps the next Jenna Jameson. In December 2006, Grey was interviewed on the syndicated entertainment industry news program The Insider. In February 2007, Grey appeared on The Tyra Banks Show and discussed teenagers working in the sex industry. There was speculation the show was heavily edited and had not included her defence of adult film as a career choice. The show was also criticized for editing the interview to increase its dramatic value.

In 2008, she became the youngest woman ever to win the AVN Female Performer of the Year Award. In 2008, Grey announced that she would represent herself in the adult industry through her agency L.A. Factory Girls. Grey also appeared in Pirates II: Stagnetti's Revenge, which won in 15 categories at the 26th AVN Awards ceremony in 2009, making it the most awarded film ever at the ceremony.

Grey attracted attention for appearing in BDSM and sadomasochistic productions. Early in her career, she described herself as a "switch", interested in both dominant and submissive roles. She had developed an interest in BDSM as a teenager, before entering the adult film industry.

Grey filmed her last adult film at age 21 in 2009 and announced her retirement from the industry on Facebook in April 2011.

A. O. Scott of The New York Times described Grey's pornography career as "distinguished both by the extremity of what she is willing to do and an unusual degree of intellectual seriousness about doing it". Grey was the G4tv host in a two-hour documentary on Sexpo Australia for Attack of the Show! in 2009. In 2011, CNBC named Grey as one of the 12 most popular stars in adult films and noted that her mainstream roles had kept interest in her earlier adult film work high and that several companies continued to release compilations from her films. The Guardian counted her as starring in 270 adult films.

Grey directed the films Birthday Party and The Seduction (2009).

=== Modeling ===
Grey was named Penthouse's Pet of the Month for July 2007 and was photographed by fashion photographer Terry Richardson. She was also profiled in the December 2008 issue of Rolling Stone and appeared twice in Playboy, in a December 2009 pictorial and as the cover feature in October 2010. Grey has modeled for various clients, including Max Azria's line Manoukian, American Apparel, and Flaunt. Grey modeled for Richard Kern as a part of Vice's anti-fashion layout and appeared in his book and in the three-part VBS.tv program Shot by Kern.

Grey appeared in Taschen's 25th anniversary reprint of Terry Richardson's book Terryworld and in his Wives, Wheels, Weapons, a companion book to James Frey's Bright Shiny Morning. She has modeled for artists James Jean, Zak Smith, Dave Naz, David Choe, and Frédéric Poincelet, who also created the artwork for her industrial music band aTelecine's ...And Six Dark Hours Pass album. In May 2010, she interviewed artist Terence Koh for BlackBook. In 2010, Grey was one of four actors who appeared in Julião Sarmento's video installation Leporello and was featured in the Richardson magazine A4. Richard Phillips made a short film called Sasha Grey in the Chemosphere for the Gagosian Gallery in 2011 and also portrayed her for the Frieze Art Fair in 2013. Hypocrite Design described Sasha Grey in the film as a "perpetually evolving figure". In an interview with Allure in 2018, Grey said her look was "definitely punk-inspired, definitely the anti-aesthetic, and I've definitely grown out of that because I'm older".

=== Acting ===
==== The Girlfriend Experience ====
In director Steven Soderbergh's film The Girlfriend Experience, Grey played the lead role of Chelsea, an escort who is paid to act as her clients' girlfriend. Soderbergh cast Grey after reading her profile in Los Angeles magazine. As Grey prepared for her role in The Girlfriend Experience, Soderbergh asked her to watch Jean-Luc Godard's films Vivre sa vie and Pierrot le Fou, both of which star Anna Karina. Grey and Soderbergh also interviewed two escorts whom they took character traits and behaviors from.

Reviews of Grey's performance in The Girlfriend Experience were mixed. Entertainment Weekly found Grey was "not so much a natural actress as a natural-born placid, affectless Barbie doll". New York said the actors "appear to be improvising (badly)". Violet Blue wrote that "Grey herself is as complex and layered and mesmerizing as a Soderbergh film itself—that's why Grey's fans cross all kinds of cultural and moral divides". On Rotten Tomatoes, the film received a rating of 66% based on 138 reviews. In 2016, Glenn Kenny who played the majordomo of an escort-review site, described The Girlfriend Experience as a "digital film from another era", with most scenes being two-handers.

==== Other ====
Grey appeared in a 2009 episode of James Gunn's PG Porn with James Gunn, made a cameo appearance in Dick Rude's 2010 independent film Quit, and starred in the 2009 Canadian low-budget black comedy/horror film Smash Cut with David Hess from Odessa/Zed Filmworks. Grey played a fictionalized version of herself in the seventh season of the HBO series Entourage as Vincent Chase's new girlfriend in a multi-episode arc. The season has a 57% rating (13 fresh, 10 rotten) on Rotten Tomatoes. Grey played Raven in the thriller I Melt With You, directed by Mark Pellington, which premiered at the Sundance Film Festival on January 26, 2011. She then starred in the Indonesian film Shrouded Corpse Bathing While Hip-Shaking, which premiered on April 28, 2011. She co-starred in the 2012 horror-thriller Would You Rather, which was directed by David Guy Levy, and which has a critics' consensus rating of 59% based on 22 reviews at Rotten Tomatoes. A critic noted the similarity of her role as "unflinching in the wildest of circumstances, when vying for a hefty sum of cash at the expense of [her] health" to Grey's own career as an adult actor.

She voiced the character Viola DeWynter in the 2011 video game Saints Row: The Third and reprised the role again in 2015 for Saints Row: Gat Out of Hell. In 2013, in the documentary series Durch die Nacht mit ..., Mariya Ocher took Grey to nightlife venues in Hamburg where Grey ignored the "women prohibited" barrier of the Herbertstraße. In 2014, she starred with Elijah Wood in Open Windows, which was directed by Nacho Vigalondo. Nikola Grozdanovic wrote that "all of Open Windows is constructed in a way for all of the action to unfold through some kind of computer screen". The Tomatometer critics' consensus for Open Windows was 40% based on 40 reviews. In 2017, Sasha Grey and Danny Trejo starred in the arthouse thriller Black Licorice, which was directed by Frankie Latina and in 2009 Grey was a co-producer of Latina's Modus Operandi, also starring Danny Trejo.

Grey appeared in music videos for The Smashing Pumpkins' 2007 song "Superchrist", and for The Roots' 2008 song "Birthday Girl". In 2011, she appeared in the music video for Eminem's song "Space Bound", which premiered on Vevo, playing a girlfriend whom Eminem strangles before realizing that she is only a figment of his imagination.

=== Music ===
In 2008, Grey began an industrial music collaboration called aTelecine with Pablo St. Francis and the two later added Anthony D' Juan and Ian Cinnamon. The project's first EP, aVigillant Carpark, was released in 2009. The same year, Grey also contributed vocals to the Current 93 album Aleph at Hallucinatory Mountain.

In 2010, aTelecine released its first album, ...And Six Dark Hours Pass, and followed it up with the first of three A Cassette Tape Culture compilations. Paul Maher Jr. compared Sasha Grey with Cathy Ames in John Steinbeck's novel East of Eden, describing the ambient tracks of aTelecine as aural wrecking balls, stated that Grey's artistic temperament comes close to that of the Marquis de Sade as "a proponent of freedom tethered to its furthest extremities, yet untethered by laws, morality or religion" and admired her courage and audacity. In July 2013, it was announced that Grey had left the band.

In 2012, Grey covered Nico for the X-TG album Desertshore. In 2014, Grey and Jayceeoh produced "Heat of the Night", featuring Bella. In 2015, psytrance band Infected Mushroom featured Grey's vocals in their album Converting Vegetarians II in the track "Fields of Grey". In 2016, Grey contributed to the Death in Vegas album Transmission. The former Throbbing Gristle members Chris & Cosey remixed "Consequences of Love", a Transmission song performed and composed by Grey and Fearless. In 2017, Michael Mayer adapted the Chris & Cosey remix in his DJ-Kicks album. Vice described Transmission as an "EBM-inspired romp through the darker edges of the sleazier clubs in the nightlife spectrum". In a cameo appearance, DJ Harvey plays "Consequences of Love" in the rave party at the Grand Palais scene of Mission: Impossible – Fallout. In 2018, Death in Vegas published the single "Honey", with Grey as writer, singer, and film director of Drone Records' video for the song. In August 2018, PIG published "That's The Way (I Like It)", featuring Grey, and premiered it on the website Pornhub.

Since 2010, Grey has regularly performed as a DJ and has published some of her mixes on SoundCloud. Grey said she uses CDJs, USB-sticks, and SD cards when making her music. Earmilk editor David Sikorski considered her mixes as "testament to her wide range, eclectic taste in music, and her ability to understand the mechanics of solid electronic music production".

=== Books ===
Grey's photo book Neü Sex was released on March 29, 2011. BlackBook described it as "another right step in transforming herself into the multimedia artist she sees herself as" and the Portland Mercury compared Grey's "distinct style" with the photography of Cindy Sherman and Terry Richardson.

Her second book, an erotic novel titled The Juliette Society, was released on May 9, 2013. Karley Sciortino described the book as a "satirical, erotic novel that follows Catherine, a film student who enters a secret, elite sex society", and in an interview Grey stated she paid homage to novels like The 120 Days of Sodom, Thérèse the Philosopher, and Voltaire's Candide. Alisande Fitzsimons wrote that The Juliette Society contains references to classic erotic literature and film, and Cosmopolitan UK called it "erotica with a difference". In 2016, the second book of The Juliette Society trilogy, The Janus Chamber, was published and the third installment, The Mismade Girl, followed in 2018. Grey described The Juliette Society as somewhat autobiographical. Allen Foster wrote that The Janus Chamber is "a brilliant work of literature", much more Satyricon than Fifty Shades of Grey, where Grey's "wry sense of humor reveals itself in the obscure pop culture references".

The trilogy was translated into several languages, and in October 2019 the German translation of The Mismade Girl was published by Heyne Hardcore as X.

=== Other ventures ===
In 2020, Grey began hosting a show on VENN called Grey Area.

Grey began streaming video game playthroughs on Twitch in the first half of 2020.

== Personal life ==
Grey identifies herself as an existentialist and as bisexual. She is an atheist. She was in a long-term relationship with a photographer, Ian Cinnamon, who is 13 years her senior, but the couple split up in 2012.

In a May 2016 interview, rock and pop culture critic Art Tavana compared Grey with Madonna, describing her as "defiantly feminist" and as "novelist, EDM DJ, sex-positive feminist, Formula 1 racer or action star—no matter what it is, it's more than 'ex-porn star'". In 2009, Meghan O'Rourke wrote that Grey "sees her extremity as helping to liberate female sexuality" but she called Grey's persona "a clever marketing tactic". Vanessa Grigoriadis stated that "what's most important about her is her impact on feminism". In a 2011 interview with Journal Frankfurt, Grey commented that she dislikes the term 'feminist', saying she would be a 'post-modern feminist' if she was one.

Grey is a professed movie buff, leading to her 2006 alias Anna Karina after the French-Danish film actress, and likes the work of Italian film director Michelangelo Antonioni, French New Wave filmmaker Jean-Luc Godard, Danish Dogme 95 director Lars von Trier, New German Cinema filmmaker Werner Herzog, feminist filmmaker Catherine Breillat, and American filmmaker David Lynch. MovieLine recognized her as "Twitter's Art-House Eulogist".

Sasha Grey described herself as a David Bowie fan and contributed to a French homage after he died in 2016. Other musical influences of Grey's include KMFDM, Throbbing Gristle, Coil, and Nine Inch Nails. Grey also collects vinyl records and her motto is Lotta continua.

In 2010, in an interview with Maxim, Grey said her parents were not happy with her involvement in the adult film industry but that they were on good terms with her nonetheless; Grey's father died in 2015.

=== Activism ===
In February 2010, Sasha Grey and Joanna Angel were Sex Week at Yale panelists.

In November 2011, Grey participated in a guest reading program at Emerson Elementary School in Compton, California. After some parents complained, Grey responded to the controversy by stating, "I committed to this program with the understanding that people would have their own opinions about what I have done, who I am, and what I represent". Grey also appeared on the American talk show The View, where she said she thought that the schoolchildren's parents should have been given prior notice of the identity of guest readers, and that she would not have accepted the job if parents had objected to her.

In March 2012, she published a video supporting Equal Pay Day. She supported Bernie Sanders during the 2016 Democratic Party presidential primaries and supports Planned Parenthood.

== Awards ==
Year	Event	Award	Film	Co-winners
2007	AVN Award	Best Three-Way Sex Scene	Fuck Slaves	Sandra Romain and Manuel Ferrara
2007	AVN Award	Best Group Sex Scene - Video	Fashionistas Safado	Belladonna, Jenna Haze, Gianna, Melissa Lauren, Sandra Romain, Adrianna Nicole, Flower Tucci, Nicole Sheridan, Marie Luv, Caroline Pierce, Christian XXX, Erik Everhard, Jean Val Jean, Mr. Pete, Rocco Siffredi, Chris Charming, Jewell Marceau, Lea Baren, and Voodoo
2007	AFWG Award	Best Orgy Scene	Fashionistas Safado	Belladonna, Jenna Haze, Gianna, Melissa Lauren, Sandra Romain, Adrianna Nicole, Flower Tucci, Nicole Sheridan, Marie Luv, Caroline Pierce, Christian XXX, Erik Everhard, Jean Val Jean, Mr. Pete, Rocco Siffredi, Chris Charming, Jewell Marceau, Lea Baren, and Voodoo
2007	AFWG Award	Teen Dream of the Year	—N/a	—N/a
2007	XRCO Award	Best New Starlet	—N/a	—N/a
2008	AVN Award	Best Oral Sex Scene - Video	Babysitters	—N/a
2008	AVN Award	Female Performer of the Year	—N/a	—N/a
2008	XRCO Award	Female Performer of the Year	—N/a	—N/a
2009	XRCO Award	Mainstream Adult Media Favorite	—N/a	—N/a
2010	AVN Award	Best Anal Sex Scene	Anal Cavity Search 6	Erik Everhard
2010	AVN Award	Best Oral Sex Scene	Throat: A Cautionary Tale	—N/a
2010	AVN Award	Crossover Star of the Year	—N/a	—N/a
2010	XBIZ Award	Crossover Star of the Year	—N/a	—N/a
2010	FAME Award	Favorite Oral Starlet	—N/a	—N/a
2010	XRCO Award	Mainstream Adult Media Favorite	—N/a	—N/a
2023	AVN Award	Hall of Fame	—N/a	—N/a
2023	XRCO Award	Hall of Fame	—N/a	—N/a

== Filmography ==
=== Film ===
Year	Title	Role	Note
2007	Homo Erectus	Cavegirl	
2007	Broken	Herself	
2008	9 to 5: Days in Porn	Herself	Documentary
2008	Circa '82	Herself	
2009	The Girlfriend Experience	Chelsea / Christine Brown	
2009	Smash Cut	April Carson	
2009	This Ain't Star Trek XXX	Chandra	
2009	Seinfeld: A XXX Parody	Herself	
2009	Sexpo Australia	Herself	Documentary
2010	Quit	Mini-mart clerk	
2010	The New Erotic: Art Sex Revolution	Herself	Documentary
2011	I Melt With You	Raven	
2011	Membunuh: Murder	Bikini-clad ghost	
2012	The Girl from the Naked Eye	Lena	
2012	Would You Rather	Amy	
2012	Inferno: A Linda Lovelace Story	Paula	Uncredited
2014	Open Windows	Jill Goddard	
2014	The Scribbler	Bunny	
2017	Black Licorice	Herself	

=== Series ===
Year	Title	Role	Notes	Publisher
2009	Porn: Business of Pleasure	Documentary	1 episode	CNBC
2009	James Gunn's PG Porn	Tricia Scrotey	Roadside Ass-istance	Web series
2010	Entourage	Herself	6 episodes	HBO
2013	Sexy NSA Commercial	Herself	1 episode	Funny or Die
2013	Durch die Nacht mit ...	Documentary	...Sasha Grey und Mary Ocher	Arte
2018	Into the Dark	Party DJ	The Body	Hulu
2020	Grey Area	Host	Talk show	VENN

=== Music videos ===
Year	Title	Role	Musicians
2006	"Daybreak"	Sex Worker	Daso
2007	"Superchrist"	Dancer	The Smashing Pumpkins
2008	"Birthday Girl"	Birthday Girl	The Roots
2011	"Space Bound"	Girl	Eminem
2014	"Toxic"	Villainess	David J

=== Video games ===
Year	Title	Role	Notes
2011	Saints Row: The Third	Viola DeWynter	Voice
2015	Saints Row: Gat Out of Hell	Viola DeWynter	Voice
2023	Cyberpunk 2077: Phantom Liberty	Ash (DJ of 89.7 Growl FM)	Voice

== Discography ==
With aTelecine:

- 2009: aVigillant Carpark (EP; Pendu Sound Recordings)
- 2010: A Cassette Tape Culture (Pendu Sound Recordings)
- 2010: ...And Six Dark Hours Pass (Dais Records)

With Current 93:

2009: Aleph at Hallucinatory Mountain (Coptic Cat)

With X-TG:

2012: Desertshore (covering Nico, Industrial Records)

With Infected Mushroom:

2015: Fields Of Grey (EP; Dim Mak Records)

With Death in Vegas:

- 2016: Transmission (LP, Drone Records)
- 2018: Honey (EP; Drone Records)

With Pig:

- 2018: That's The Way (I Like It) (EP; Pig Industries, Armalyte Industries)
- 2019: You've Lost That Lovin' Feelin' (cover duet, LP Candy, Armalyte Industries)

== Bibliography ==
- Grey, Sasha (2011). Neü Sex. New York: Vice; Distributed by PowerHouse Books. ISBN 978-1-57687-556-8.
- The Juliette Society (Grand Central Publishing, 2013, ISBN 978-0-7515-5158-7)
- The Juliette Society, Book II: The Janus Chamber (Cleis Press, 2016, ISBN 978-1-62778-180-0)
- The Juliette Society, Book III: The Mismade Girl (Cleis Press, 2018, ISBN 978-1-62778-182-4)

== See also ==
- Feminist views on pornography
- List of adult film actors who appeared in mainstream films
- List of premature obituaries
