= Iron Moon (disambiguation) =

Iron Moon is a 2015 documentary film about Chinese poetry.

Iron Moon may also refer to:

- Iron Moon: Chinese Worker's Poetry (book), a 2017 multi-author poetry anthology translated by Eleanor Goodman
- The Iron Moon (poem), a Chinese-language poem by Xu Lizhi (poet)
- "Iron Moon" (Chelsea Wolfe song), a 2015 single by 'Chelsea Wolfe' off the 2015 album Abyss
- "Iron Moon" (Fit for an Autopsy song), a 2017 single by 'Fit for an Autopsy' off the 2017 album The Great Collapse

== See also ==
- Iron Sky, a retro-futuristic alternate-history diesel-punk film about Nazis occupying the Moon
- Moon (disambiguation)
- Iron (disambiguation)
