= Pain Is Beauty =

Studio album by Chelsea Wolfe
- Released: September 3, 2013
- Genres: Experimental rock; post-punk; gothic rock; gothic folk; psychedelic folk; industrial
- Length: 54:53
- Label: Sargent House
- Producers: Chelsea Wolfe; Ben Chisholm

Chelsea Wolfe chronology
Unknown Rooms: A Collection of Acoustic Songs (2012)	Pain Is Beauty (2013)	Abyss (2015)

Pain Is Beauty is the third studio album from American singer-songwriter and eponymous band, Chelsea Wolfe released on September 3, 2013, through Sargent House.

== Theme ==
Thematically, Pain Is Beauty is said to be largely about idealistic love. Though Wolfe has also stated "It’s not a conceptual album. There’s a lot of different things it’s about: it’s about ancestry, it’s about nature, it’s about tormented love and sort of overcoming the odds. There’s a lot of different themes on this album." According to Wolfe, the red dress she is wearing on the album cover represents volcanic lava. Regarding the album title, Wolfe admitted, "...there's always gonna be situations that we go through that are really hard and we just have to kind of be strong, and if we get through to the other side, then we become wiser people and our lives become more beautiful."

== Style ==
Consequence of Sound described the album's "addition of synths and sequenced beats create an expansive hybrid of her past three albums." The website also noted "distinctive strokes of seductive goth rock, psych folk, and post-punk"

== Reception ==
Professional ratings
Aggregate scores
Source	Rating
AnyDecentMusic?	7.7/10
Metacritic	82/100
Review scores
Source	Rating
AllMusic	4/5 stars
Consequence of Sound	4/5 stars
DIY	7/10
Drowned in Sound	8/10
The Irish Times	4/5 stars
MusicOMH	4.5/5 stars
NME	6/10
Pitchfork	8.0/10
PopMatters	8/10
Uncut	8/10

Pain Is Beauty was well-received by music critics upon its initial release. The aggregate review site Metacritic assigned an average score of 82 to the album based on 17 reviews, indicating "universal acclaim".

In a positive review by Nate Chinen of The New York Times, the reviewer commented on the album's tone remarking, "...the attractive but suffocating atmosphere on Pain Is Beauty should be understood as precise aesthetic calculation", also stating, "Pain Is Beauty, her fourth album in three years, confirms her steadiness as a singer-songwriter of gothic intention, drawn to romantic fatalism and beautiful ruin." Comparing the album to previous records, Heather Phares of AllMusic expressed, "Wolfe opts for a fuller-fledged sound than she did on Unknown Rooms in a more tempered and eclectic way than Apokalypsis delivered", explaining, "With the help of Ben Chisholm and her other collaborators, she's free to go in virtually any direction she chooses, and she ends up choosing quite a few." In the review for Pitchfork, Jenn Pelly stated that "Wolfe's songs of Pain emphasize massive builds with engulfing power in the vein of Swans. It's emotionally exhausting in equally mad and enjoyable ways, lasting nearly an hour across 12 twilight tracks of aggressive crescendos, poised reprieves, and suspended drama. The slower her metamorphosis, the heavier and more cavernous."

Several reviews have critiqued the album's cohesiveness; as Angel of Sputnikmusic notes, "While it's possible Pain Is Beauty would have benefited from some more time spent songwriting and fleshing out the overall direction of the album's sound, there's still more than enough impressive songs to make this a worthy addition to the Chelsea Wolfe catalog".

== Track listing ==
No.	Title	Length
1.	"Feral Love"	3:22
2.	"We Hit a Wall"	3:36
3.	"House of Metal"	5:00
4.	"The Warden"	3:53
5.	"Destruction Makes the World Burn Brighter"	2:38
6.	"Sick"	5:35
7.	"Kings"	3:59
8.	"Reins"	5:15
9.	"Ancestors, the Ancients"	4:35
10.	"They'll Clap When You're Gone"	5:52
11.	"The Waves Have Come"	8:29
12.	"Lone"	2:37
Total length:		54:53

Japanese edition bonus track
No.	Title	Length
13.	"Feral Love" (Live)	3:40
Total length:		58:33

== Personnel ==
Pain Is Beauty album personnel adapted from AllMusic.

- Andrea Calderon – violin
- Anna Dobos – cover photo
- Ben Chisholm – bass, engineer, mixing, production, programming, synthesizer
- Chelsea Wolfe – composer, engineer, guitar, mixing, producer, vocals
- Chris Common – mixing
- Dylan Fuijoka – drums
- Ezra Buchla – viola
- Kevin Dockter – guitars
- Kristin Cofer – band photo, photography
- Patrick Shiroishi – baritone clarinet, saxophone
- Trevor Hernandez – design, layout

== Charts ==
Chart	Peak position
US Billboard 200	4
US Independent Albums (Billboard)	45
US Indie Store Album Sales (Billboard)	25
US Heatseekers Albums (Billboard)	22
US Americana/Folk Albums (Billboard)	11
US Vinyl Albums (Billboard)	6
