= Mrs. Piss =

American musical duo

- Years active: 2017–present
- Labels: Sargent House
- Members: Chelsea Wolfe; Jess Gowrie

Mrs. Piss is a collaborative project consisting of American musicians Chelsea Wolfe and Jess Gowrie.

== History ==
Mrs. Piss played together in a band called Red Host in the early 2000s. The duo started the project while touring around Wolfe's 2017 album Hiss Spun. Wolfe said "Working on this project brought Jess and I so much closer as songwriters and production partners, after reuniting as friends and bandmates."

Mrs. Piss released their debut album Self-Surgery on May 29, 2020. They shared two singles from the album - "Downer Surrounded by Uppers" and "Knelt" - on May 14.

== Members ==
- Chelsea Wolfe – guitar, vocals
- Jess Gowrie – drums, guitar, bass, programming

== Discography ==
Studio albums

- Self-Surgery (2020)

Live albums

- Self-Surgery (Live) (2022)
