= Bloodmoon: I =

Studio album by Converge and Chelsea Wolfe
- Released: November 19, 2021
- Recorded: 2019–2020
- Studios: GodCity, Salem, Massachusetts
- Genres: Post-metal; hardcore punk; symphonic metal; gothic metal
- Length: 58:42
- Labels: Epitaph, Deathwish
- Producers: Kurt Ballou; Jacob Bannon; Stephen Brodsky; Ben Chisholm; Chelsea Wolfe

Converge chronology
Beautiful Ruin (2018)	Bloodmoon: I (2021)	Love Is Not Enough (2026)

Chelsea Wolfe chronology
Birth of Violence (2019)	Bloodmoon: I (2021)	X (Original Motion Picture Soundtrack) (2022)

Singles from Bloodmoon: I
- 1. "Blood Moon" Released: September 27, 2021; 2. "Coil" Released: November 3, 2021

Bloodmoon: I is a collaborative studio album by American metalcore band Converge and American singer-songwriter Chelsea Wolfe. It is the tenth studio album by Converge, and seventh studio album by Chelsea Wolfe. It was released on November 19, 2021, via Epitaph Records and Deathwish Inc, the band's first studio album in four years since 2017's The Dusk in Us. Converge's longtime collaborator Stephen Brodsky and Wolfe's longtime collaborator Ben Chisholm also contributed. The album was produced by Converge guitarist Kurt Ballou and the artwork was created by the band's singer Jacob Bannon. It was met with universal critical acclaim, receiving an average score of 89 based on 10 reviews aggregated by Metacritic.

== Background ==
The album was preceded in 2016 by Blood Moon, in which Converge united with Wolfe and her collaborator Ben Chisholm as well as former Converge member and longtime collaborator Stephen Brodsky of Cave In and Steve Von Till of Neurosis to perform classic Converge songs live in an atmospheric post-rock style. All of the aforementioned except Von Till reunited to record Bloodmoon: I. Bannon stated, "These songs were written by seven people. Not only shaped by the seven, but we're all in that mix together — more so than any other Converge record." The lineup began working on the album in late 2019, but in 2020, due to COVID, the rest of the album was finished remotely.

The album marks the first time since 2009's Axe to Fall that the band has featured collaborators or guest musicians.

== Release and promotion ==
On September 28, 2021, Converge announced the album, including its tracklist and cover art, and released the title single "Blood Moon", accompanied by a video for the song. On November 3, Converge released the song "Coil" available for streaming. The collaborative act performed its first Bloodmoon shows in April 2022 in Boston and New York, with Caspian opening.

== Reception ==
Professional ratings
Aggregate scores
Source	Rating
AnyDecentMusic?	8.4/10
Metacritic	89/100
Review scores
Source	Rating
AllMusic	4.5/5 stars
The A.V. Club	A−
Beats Per Minute	66.6%
The Guardian	5/5 stars
Kerrang!	5/5
Mojo	4/5 stars
Pitchfork	5.3/10
PopMatters	9/10
The Skinny	5/5 stars
Sputnikmusic	5.0/5

Bloodmoon: I was met with universal critical acclaim. At Metacritic, which assigns a normalized rating out of 100 to reviews from mainstream publications, it received an average score of 89 based on 10 reviews.

== Accolades ==
=== Year-end lists ===
Publication	Accolade	Rank	Ref.
Decibel	Decibel's Top 40 Albums of 2021	7	
Kerrang!	The 50 Best Albums of 2021: Staff List	10	
Loudwire	The 45 Best Rock + Metal Albums of 2021	13	
Revolver	25 Best Albums of 2021	6	
Rolling Stone	The 10 Best Metal Albums of 2021	5	
Metal Hammer	The 50 Best Albums of 2021	7	

== Track listing ==
No.	Title	Length
1.	"Blood Moon"	7:50
2.	"Viscera of Men"	5:29
3.	"Coil"	6:08
4.	"Flower Moon"	4:38
5.	"Tongues Playing Dead"	4:12
6.	"Lord of Liars"	3:23
7.	"Failure Forever"	4:01
8.	"Scorpion's Sting"	5:46
9.	"Daimon"	7:00
10.	"Crimson Stone"	6:42
11.	"Blood Dawn"	3:33
Total length:		58:42

== Personnel ==
Converge & Chelsea Wolfe

- Kurt Ballou – guitars, bass, backing vocals, production, mixing, engineering
- Jacob Bannon – vocals, bass, production, engineering, art direction, design, illustrations
- Ben Koller – drums, percussion
- Nate Newton – bass, guitars, backing vocals
- Chelsea Wolfe – vocals, guitars, production, engineering
- Ben Chisholm – synthesizer, piano, electronics, bass, production, engineering

Additional contributors

- Stephen Brodsky – guitars, bass, additional vocals, production, engineering
- Magnus Lindberg – mastering
- Zach Weeks – engineering assistance
- Emily Birds – photography
- Aaron Horkey – logo illustration
- Ashley Rose – costume design

== Charts ==
Chart performance for Bloodmoon: I
Chart (2022)	Peak position
German Albums (Offizielle Top 100)	59
