= The Grime and the Glow =

- Original physical cover. Reissues and digital editions show a closer and clearer picture.

Studio album by Chelsea Wolfe
- Released: December 28, 2010
- Recorded: 2009–2010
- Genre: Indie folk; experimental; lo-fi
- Length: 40:58
- Label: Pendu Sound
- Producer: Chelsea Wolfe

Chelsea Wolfe chronology
The Grime and the Glow (2010)	Apokalypsis (2011)

The Grime and the Glow is the debut studio album by American singer-songwriter Chelsea Wolfe. It was released on December 28, 2010. The album received generally positive reviews from music critics, with Wolfe drawing comparisons to PJ Harvey.

== Writing and composition ==
=== Background ===
In 2006 Wolfe composed an album, titled Mistake in Parting, though it was never officially released. About the album, Wolfe said: "I was 21 years old and wrote a shitty singer-songwriter breakup album. I didn't even really want to be a musician back then, but a lot of my friends were like 'let's do this, I've got some producer friends' and they helped me make this over-produced, terrible record... I sort of took a break from music for a while since I wasn't happy with what I was making". Wolfe later commented that she scrapped the album largely because it was written about personal events in her life: "I was writing really personal stuff about my own life, and I didn't feel comfortable at all... I didn't want [my music] to be so much about myself, and I just had to find a new perspective".

After stepping away from the music she had made in her younger years, in the summer of 2009, Chelsea Wolfe embarked on a European tour with a group of performance artists, playing in unusual spaces, including cathedrals, basements, and old nuclear plants for whoever would listen. After she returned home, she started over her approach to making music and began writing and recording with her old Tascam 488 8-track recorder, and those recordings would eventually lead to The Grime and The Glow. Wolfe stated that she began writing songs when she was 9 years old but it was not until she became 25 when she decided to release her music. The tracks "Bounce House Demons" and "Moses" were reworked for Wolfe's second studio album Apokalypsis (2011), with the former being renamed "Demons".

== Critical reception ==
Professional ratings
Review scores
Source	Rating
AllMusic	3.5/5 stars
Fine Print Magazine	(favorable)
Spectrum Culture	4/5 stars

The Grime and the Glow received generally positive reviews from music critics. CNN's Chris Parks described the album to have "an experimental, lo-fidelity sound that showcased her vocal prowess." Heather Phares of AllMusic felt that The Grime and the Glow "revealed all [Wolfe] could do with the simplest of tools" and made comparisons to "White Chalk-era PJ Harvey in its desolate minimalism [with] studies in beauty, noise, and terror." John Sant for Fine Print Magazine also compared her to Harvey but stated that "Wolfe is more in step with Nick Cave's menacing spiritualism and Chris Goss' trademark empty-desert psychedelia." Andrew Sacher of BrooklynVegan characterized the album as "a self-recorded gem which successfully blends dark folk, noise and Grouper-esque ethereality." In a Spectrum Culture review made for The Grime and the Glow's reissue, Nathan Stevens expressed that the record was "recorded in such a dismal and dirty way that it could have been made decades ago," adding that this "lends the album power though."

== Track listing ==
All tracks are written by Chelsea Wolfe.

No.	Title	Length
1.	"Advice & Vices"	2:52
2.	"Cousins of the Antichrist"	2:45
3.	"Moses"	4:57
4.	"Deep Talks"	3:18
5.	"Fang"	2:12
6.	"Benjamin"	4:19
7.	"The Whys"	3:51
8.	"Noorus"	3:29
9.	"Halfsleeper"	6:01
10.	"Bounce House Demons"	3:20
11.	"Widow"	3:54
Total length:		40:58

Digital bonus tracks
No.	Title	Length
12.	"Gene Wilder"	3:01
13.	"Move"	1:38
14.	"You Are My Sunshine"	6:43
Total length:		52:20

CD track listing
No.	Title	Length
1.	"Advice & Vices"	2:52
2.	"Cousins of the Antichrist"	2:45
3.	"Moses"	4:57
4.	"Deep Talks"	3:18
5.	"Fang"	2:12
6.	"Benjamin"	4:19
7.	"The Whys"	3:51
8.	"Noorus"	3:29
9.	"Gene Wilder"	3:01
10.	"Halfsleeper"	6:01
11.	"Bounce House Demons"	3:20
12.	"Sirenum Scopuli"	2:00
13.	"Widow"	3:54
Total length:		45:59

== Personnel ==
- Chelsea Wolfe – vocals, guitar, production
- Ben Chisholm – piano (6, 12)
- Kevin Dockter – lead guitar (1, 8)
- Drew Walker – drums (1, 8)
- Addison Quarles – bass guitar (1, 8)
