= X (soundtrack) =

X (Original Motion Picture Soundtrack)

Soundtrack album by Tyler Bates and Chelsea Wolfe
- Released: March 25, 2022
- Recorded: 2021–2022
- Genre: Film score
- Length: 49:03
- Label: A24 Music
- Producer: Tyler Bates and Chelsea Wolfe

Tyler Bates chronology
Books of Blood (2020)	X (2022)	Day Shift (2022)

Chelsea Wolfe chronology
Bloodmoon: I (2021)	X (2022)	She Reaches Out to She Reaches Out to She (2024)

X (Original Motion Picture Soundtrack) is the soundtrack to the 2022 slasher film of the same name written, directed, produced and edited by Ti West, starring Mia Goth, Jenna Ortega, Martin Henderson, Brittany Snow, Owen Campbell, Stephen Ure and Scott Mescudi. The album featured an original score composed by Tyler Bates and Chelsea Wolfe which was released through A24 Music on March 25, 2022.

== Development ==
X marked Bates' second collaboration with West after he previously worked with the latter on The Sacrament (2013). Bates said that the pair intended to "create a vocal-centric score framed with organic synthesizers and atmospheres that evoke a sonic aesthetic of '70s arthouse horror films". He then used the wakka wakka guitars as another substantial component to the score, that provided a propulsive element to the disturbing scenes. Wolfe, who had not soundtracked a film before, primarily contributed her voice to the score, and attempted to use non-singing sounds to emulate the character's emotions. Bates compared the score to that somewhere between that of Debbie Does Dallas and Rosemary's Baby.

== Release ==
The soundtrack album was released on March 25, 2022, by A24 Music. It was preceded by a cover version of "Oui, Oui, Marie" performed by Wolfe, which was released as a digital single on March 11, 2022.

== Additional music ==
The film incorporates a number of songs from the 1960s and 1970s, including "In the Summertime" by Mungo Jerry, "Act Naturally" by Loretta Lynn, and "(Don't Fear) The Reaper" by Blue Öyster Cult. Additionally, one scene in the film features Jackson (Scott Mescudi) and Bobby-Lynne (Brittany Snow) performing "Landslide" by Fleetwood Mac, with the former playing acoustic guitar and the latter providing vocals.

== Critical reception ==
Justin Lockwood of Bloody Disgusting wrote "Bates and Wolfe have created a unique musical tapestry befitting such a rich and unique cinematic experience." Matt Donato of /Film wrote "Tyler Bates and Chelsea Wolfe's disquieting score scampers with chaotic freneticism". Patrick Cavanaugh of ComicBook.com wrote "While Bates was able to lay a foundation to establish the mood and atmosphere of the picture by establishing an era-appropriate base level, Wolfe's more haunting and ethereal vocal contributions elevate the discordant elements of the score while never fully plunging us into darkness."

== Track listing ==
All tracks are written by Tyler Bates and Chelsea Wolfe, except where noted.

X (Original Motion Picture Soundtrack) track listing
No.	Title	Writer(s)	Length
1.	"My God"		2:10
2.	"Maxine Meets Pearl"		1:19
3.	"Theda"		2:36
4.	"Pearl's Lullaby"		1:31
5.	"Fucking Finally"		1:14
6.	"Pearl's Rapture"		1:20
7.	"Dolls"		3:00
8.	"Pumping Gas"		0:20
9.	"Our Secret"		3:08
10.	"Use Your Telephone"		0:52
11.	"We Talked About This"		2:07
12.	"Nice Girl"		1:34
13.	"Headlights"		4:21
14.	"Sorry to Disturb You"		2:38
15.	"The Cellar"		1:06
16.	"What Is It Baby?"		1:13
17.	"I Was Young Once"		3:05
18.	"Tell Me I'm Special"		3:59
19.	"Maxine Grabs the Gun"		4:11
20.	"Oui, Oui, Marie" (vocals by Chelsea Wolfe)	Fred Fisher; Alfred Bryan; Joseph McCarthy	6:15
21.	"Bring Our Daughters Home"		1:00
