= Self-Surgery =

Studio album by Mrs. Piss
- Released: May 29, 2020
- Length: 18:50
- Label: Sargent House

Singles from Self-Surgery
- 1. "Downer Surrounded by Uppers / Knelt" Released: May 14, 2020

Alternative cover
- Alternative version cover

Self-Surgery is the debut studio album by American two-piece rock band Mrs. Piss, consisting of Chelsea Wolfe and Jess Gowrie. It was released through Sargent House on May 29, 2020.

== Release ==
The album's two singles, "Downer Surrounded by Uppers" and "Knelt", were released on May 14, 2020. To create an alternative version cover, Caroline Vitelli used an image from the movie The Lost Door (2008).

== Critical reception ==
Professional ratings
Aggregate scores
Source	Rating
Metacritic	75/100
Review scores
Source	Rating
AllMusic	3.5/5 stars
Beats Per Minute	65%
Clash	7/10
Exclaim!	8/10

Mark Deming of Allmusic said "This is a bold, brave effort from two artists willing to push the boundaries of their music, and Mrs. Piss is a side project that has more than earned its reason to exist." Addison Herron-Wheeler of Exclaim! reviewed "Self-Surgery is heavy and punishing, darker than a lot of the music the two make on their own, and that's saying something."

== Track listing ==
Credits are adapted from Apple Music.

No.	Title	Length
1.	"To Crawl Inside"	0:43
2.	"Downer Surrounded by Uppers"	2:00
3.	"Knelt"	4:03
4.	"Nobody Wants to Party with Us"	2:49
5.	"M.B.O.T.W.O."	1:22
6.	"You Took Everything"	2:34
7.	"Self-Surgery"	2:42
8.	"Mrs. Piss"	2:33
Total length:		18:50
