= She Reaches Out to She Reaches Out to She =

2024 studio album by Chelsea Wolfe

Studio album by Chelsea Wolfe
- Released: February 9, 2024
- Genre: Electronica
- Length: 42:56
- Label: Loma Vista
- Producer: Dave Sitek

Chelsea Wolfe chronology
X (Original Motion Picture Soundtrack) (2022)	She Reaches Out to She Reaches Out to She (2024)	Undone EP (2024)

Singles from She Reaches Out to She Reaches Out to She
- 1. "Dusk" Released: September 20, 2023; 2. "Whispers in the Echo Chamber" Released: October 24, 2023; 3. "Tunnel Lights" Released: November 28, 2023; 4. "Everything Turns Blue" Released: January 17, 2024

She Reaches Out to She Reaches Out to She is the eighth studio album by American singer-songwriter Chelsea Wolfe. It was released on February 9, 2024, by Loma Vista Recordings, her first album with the label. It was preceded by four singles.

The album was recorded with producer and TV on the Radio guitarist Dave Sitek, as well as regular Wolfe collaborators Ben Chisholm, Bryan Tulao, and Jess Gowrie. It consists primarily of electronica, with significant influence of trip hop, gothic rock, and industrial music, and was mainly inspired by Wolfe achieving sobriety in January 2021. It was received positively by critics, who described the album as ambitious, adventurous, and sonically disparate.

The album was followed by two EPs. The first was a remix EP, Undone EP, released on August 30, featuring remixes by Ash Koosha, Full of Hell, Boy Harsher, Justin K Broadrick, Forest Swords, and Crosses. The second, the Unbound EP of acoustic renditions of songs from the album, was released on November 15.

== Background ==
After starting work on the album in 2020, Wolfe made the decision to get sober in January 2021. She had started drinking alcohol as a preteen, and realized in her adult years that she was relying on it to "push myself past my own energetic limits, and just do too much." Having struggled in the past to write about deeply personal subject matter, Wolfe waited until she felt "like I was really solid in my sobriety and like it was going to really stick" before she was ready to tackle her struggles in song. Wolfe also noted the inspiration of seeing a friend leave a toxic relationship of 30 years and learning how to live on their own again, and musical influences including the Depeche Mode album Violator, Nine Inch Nails, and Tricky.

When asked for ten songs that influenced the album, Wolfe named Depeche Mode's "Waiting for the Night", the Smashing Pumpkins's "Daphne Descends", Björk's "Bachelorette", Madonna's "Frozen", Nine Inch Nails's "The Hand That Feeds", Massive Attack's "Teardrop", Low's "Rome (Always in the Dark)", Radiohead's "Where I End and You Begin", TV on the Radio's "Staring at the Sun", and Lhasa de Sela's "Anywhere on This Road".

According to Wolfe, the album's title refers to "the past version of yourself connecting with the present version of yourself, connecting with the future version of yourself". The album cover features Wolfe holding a glass egg which, to her, represented possibility. The image was meant to convey a nurturing tone.

== Release ==
On September 20, 2023, Wolfe announced that she had signed with Loma Vista, and released the album's lead single "Dusk". Consequence declared it the Heavy Song of the Week, with Jon Hadusek calling it "genre-defying" and saying it "deserves to be heard on a good set of speakers or headphones." Along the release of "Dusk", Wolfe announced a US and Canada tour with Divide and Dissolve for February and March 2024.

The album was announced on October 24, 2023, with a release date of February 9, 2024, by Loma Vista. It came with the release of the second single, "Whispers in the Echo Chamber", and a music video directed by George Gallardo Kattah. With the announcement, Wolfe stated that the album was about "the past self reaching out to the present self reaching out to the future self to summon change, growth, and guidance."

The third single, "Tunnel Lights", was released on November 28, with another video directed by Gallardo Kattah. On January 17, 2024, Wolfe released the fourth single, "Everything Turns Blue", with a visualizer and a statement that the song is about "finding yourself again after a long era of being part of something toxic. Making a split with someone after 10 years, 20 years, 30 years — there's going to be some high highs and low lows as you begin to process it all."

== Style ==
The album mainly consists of electronica, and features significant influence of trip hop, gothic rock, and industrial music. Some tracks include industrial metal, darkwave, electropop, jazz-metal, and IDM. The electronic elements of the album have been described as "gaseous", "minimalist", "lush", "cavernous", and a "buzzing embrace".

== Critical reception ==
She Reaches Out to She Reaches Out to She ratings
Aggregate scores
Source	Rating
AnyDecentMusic?	7.5/10
Metacritic	80/100
Review scores
Source	Rating
AllMusic	4.5/5 stars
Clash	8/10
Exclaim!	8/10
Kerrang!	4/5
The Line of Best Fit	8/10
Pitchfork	7.6/10
PopMatters	6/10
The Skinny	4/5 stars
Slant Magazine	3.5/5 stars
Uncut	7/10

According to the review aggregator Metacritic, She Reaches Out to She Reaches Out to She received "generally favorable reviews" based on a weighted average score of 80 out of 100 from 15 critic scores.

Uncut's Johnny Sharp wrote that while Wolfe "tries too hard" with opener "Whispers in the Echo Chamber", her "talent for a melodramatic hook wins through" on "Tunnel Lights" and "Everything Turns Blue". Slant Magazine's Steve Erickson noted a tension in Wolfe's music between her "tendency to overdramatize or cloak her pain in gothic imagery and a genuine yearning to be heard and understood", saying She Reaches Out to She Reaches Out to She is more often the latter.

Clash's Tom Morgan said that while "it'd be difficult to proclaim it her finest work", the album is "certainly Wolfe's most ambitious and careful-constructed". Exclaim!'s Marko Djurdjić called the album "a wondrous, rhythmic exercise in acceptance, change and self-love." Kerrang!'s Sam Law said the album "may be the most creatively adventurous of her career", and called it "a promise that as brilliantly beguiling as Chelsea Wolfe has always been, her big picture is still coming into focus".

The Line of Best Fit's Greg Hyde wrote that "it is clear when listening to the album after learning of Wolfe's intended vision for it that she has executed it greatly", and said that "fans of artists as disparate as Converge and Tricky should love it". The Skinny's Adam Turner-Heffer called the album "another successful reinvention from the Californian artist". AllMusic's Heather Phares called the album "hopeful in a deeply honest way" and said it "chronicles an evolution that brings out the best, most adventurous aspects of Wolfe's music." In a less positive review, PopMatters's Adriane Pontecorvo wrote that "while [Wolfe's] disparate choices of canvas give us a bumpy ride, it's one worth taking in good faith."

== Track listing ==
All lyrics are written by Chelsea Wolfe; all music is composed by Wolfe, Ben Chisholm, Bryan Tulao, and Jess Gowrie, except where noted.

She Reaches Out to She Reaches Out to She track listing
No.	Title	Music	Length
1.	"Whispers in the Echo Chamber"		4:01
2.	"House of Self-Undoing"		4:23
3.	"Everything Turns Blue"		4:26
4.	"Tunnel Lights"	Wolfe; Chisholm	4:08
5.	"The Liminal"		4:51
6.	"Eyes Like Nightshade"	Wolfe; Chisholm; Gowrie	4:34
7.	"Salt"		4:23
8.	"Unseen World"		3:27
9.	"Place in the Sun"		4:09
10.	"Dusk"		4:34
Total length:			42:56

== Personnel ==
- Chelsea Wolfe – vocals
- Dave Sitek – producer
- Ben Chisholm – piano, synthesizer, drum programming
- Bryan Tulao – guitar
- Jess Gowrie – drums, synthesizer, guitar (2)
- Derek Coburn – recording engineer
- Shawn Everett – mixing engineer
- Heba Kadry – mastering engineer
- Seth Presant – immersive mix engineer

== Charts ==
Chart performance for She Reaches Out to She Reaches Out to She
Chart (2024)	Peak position
Belgian Albums (Ultratop Flanders)	107
Belgian Albums (Ultratop Wallonia)	122
German Albums (Offizielle Top 100)	43
Scottish Albums (Official Charts)	19
Swiss Albums (Schweizer Hitparade)	28
UK Album Downloads (Official Charts)	9

== EPs ==
=== Undone EP ===
Undone EP

Remix album by Chelsea Wolfe
- Released: August 30, 2024
- Length: 26:05
- Label: Loma Vista

Chelsea Wolfe chronology
She Reaches Out to She Reaches Out to She (2024)	Undone EP (2024)	Unbound (2024)

On August 2, Wolfe announced the Undone EP, a six-track EP of remixes of songs from the album. The project features remixes by Ash Koosha, Full of Hell, Boy Harsher, Justin K Broadrick, Forest Swords, and Crosses. It was released on August 30 by Loma Vista. Boy Harsher's remix of "House of Self-Undoing" was released on June 11, and Crosses's remix of "Tunnel Lights" was released on August 2.

==== Track listing ====
Undone EP track listing
No.	Title	Remixer	Length
1.	"Tunnel Lights"	Crosses	4:23
2.	"House of Self-Undoing"	Boy Harsher	4:01
3.	"Whispers in the Echo Chamber"	Forest Swords	4:19
4.	"Dusk"	Ash Koosha	4:15
5.	"Eyes Like Nightshade"	Full of Hell	4:24
6.	"Everything Turns Blue"	Justin K Broadrick	4:43
Total length:			26:05

=== Unbound EP ===
Unbound EP

EP by Chelsea Wolfe
- Released: November 15, 2024
- Length: 16:31
- Label: Loma Vista

Chelsea Wolfe chronology
Undone EP (2024)	Unbound EP (2024)	The Dark (2026)

On October 15, Wolfe announced the Unbound EP, an EP of acoustic renditions of four songs from the album and a cover of the Spiritbox song "Cellar Door". Wolfe previously performed her version of "Cellar Door" on the BBC Radio 1 Rock Show, to which Spiritbox vocalist Courtney LaPlante responded approvingly. The EP was released on November 15 by Loma Vista. With the announcement, Wolfe released a music video for the new version of "Place in the Sun".

Anthony Fantano ranked the EP at 13 out of his top 15 EPs of 2024, saying that while he liked She Reaches Out to She Reaches Out to She, he found an appreciation in the Unbound EP bringing a stripped-back intimacy to the songs which the album lacked.

==== Track listing ====
Unbound EP track listing
No.	Title	Writer(s)	Length
1.	"Whispers in the Echo Chamber (Unbound)"		3:25
2.	"Dusk (Unbound)"		3:24
3.	"The Liminal (Unbound)"		3:20
4.	"Place in the Sun (Unbound)"		3:52
5.	"Cellar Door"	Courtney LaPlante; Dan Braunstein; Mike Stringer	2:30
Total length:			16:31
