= Unknown Rooms: A Collection of Acoustic Songs =

Compilation album by Chelsea Wolfe
- Released: October 16, 2012
- Recorded: 2012
- Studio: Private residence, Northern California: Wolfe's residence, Los Angeles
- Genre: Acoustic; folk
- Length: 24:50
- Label: Sargent House
- Producer: Chelsea Wolfe; Ben Chisholm

Chelsea Wolfe chronology
Apokalypsis (2011)	Unknown Rooms: A Collection of Acoustic Songs (2012)	Pain Is Beauty (2013)

Singles from Unknown Rooms: A Collection of Acoustic Songs
- 1. "The Way We Used To" Released: July 28, 2012; 2. "Appalachia" Released: September 20, 2012; 3. "Flatlands" Released: September 28, 2012

Unknown Rooms: A Collection of Acoustic Songs is a compilation album from American singer-songwriter Chelsea Wolfe. It was released on October 16, 2012. The album is considered to be a collection of songs that were "once-orphaned, [and] given a home," rather than Wolfe's next full-length album.

== Background ==
Once Wolfe signed with L.A. based Sargent House Records, they suggested that she re-released some of her older, acoustic music that was "floating around the internet" and never saw a wide release. The majority of these tracks are songs that Wolfe had been working on for several years, but are new recordings of these tracks entirely, with the exception of the two digital bonus tracks, which are original recordings.

The song "Boyfriend" is a cover of the song by Karlos Rene Ayala, and was also co-composed by Ben Chisholm, a bandmate of Wolfe's.

== Release ==
On Oct. 9, the album was made available to stream for free via SoundCloud, after being previously leaked the month before.

On January 25, 2013, a music video was released for the song, "Flatlands", as a collaboration with Converse and Decibel Magazine.

== Reception ==
=== Critical ===
Professional ratings
Review scores
Source	Rating
Consequence of Sound	3.5/5 stars
Pitchfork Media	7.7/10.0
Tiny Mix Tapes	4/5 stars
AllMusic	4/5 stars

Unknown Rooms was met with positive reviews from music critics, on Metacritic, which assigns a normalized rating out of 100 to reviews from mainstream critics, the album received an average score of 73 based on 8 reviews, indicating "generally favorable reviews". Jayson Green of Pitchfork Media scored the album a 7.7, saying that, "Unknown Rooms is a short album, but its nine songs capture and sustain free-floating fear and menace," while Adrian Agacer of Tiny Mix Tapes gave the album four stars, stating, "This is a sparse album, Chelsea Wolfe's quietest, most beautiful album to date, showcasing a vulnerability that simultaneously pushes the listener's comfort level to its limits and is sincerely inviting in its simplicity. Unlike last year's Apokalypsis, which had its moments of anarchic liveliness and heightened motions and speeds ("Demons"), Unknown Rooms is entirely built on pure rests and negative space, the nerve-racking space of silence."

=== Commercial ===
Unknown Rooms is Wolfe's first album to chart in the US.

== Track listing ==
All tracks are written by Chelsea Wolfe except where noted.

No.	Title	Lyrics	Music	Length
1.	"Flatlands"			4:00
2.	"The Way We Used To"			2:47
3.	"Spinning Centers"			3:09
4.	"Appalachia"			3:10
5.	"I Died With You"			0:32
6.	"Boyfriend"	Karlos Rene Ayala	Karlos Rene Ayala; Ben Chisholm	3:51
7.	"Our Work Was Good"			1:53
8.	"Hyper Oz"			2:33
9.	"Sunstorm"			2:55
Total length:				24:50

Digital bonus tracks
No.	Title	Length
10.	"Virginia Woolf Underwater"	4:22
11.	"Gold"	3:31
Total length:		32:43

== Personnel ==
- Chelsea Wolfe – lead vocals, acoustic guitar, record producer
- Ben Chisholm – drums, analog synths, piano, backing vocals, production

Additional personnel

- Ezra Buchla – viola (3, 4)
- Andrea Calderon – violin (1)
- Daniel Denton – bass (2, 4, 7)
- Jere Wolfe – guitar (7)

== Charts ==
Chart (2012)	Peak position
US Americana/Folk Albums (Billboard)	24
US Heatseekers Albums (Billboard)	35
