= Mater Suspiria Vision =

- Origin: Germany
- Genres: Witch house; industrial; drone
- Years active: 2009–present
- Labels: Phantasma Disques; Disaro; Clan Destine Records; Giallo Disco; Pendu Sound Recordings; CDX; O'69; Mishka
- Members: Cosmotropia de Xam

Mater Suspiria Vision is a worldwide collective founded by producer, filmmaker and artist Cosmotropia de Xam. The band's debut release, Second Coming, was released on Disaro in February 2010. Mater Suspiria Vision are often recognized as pioneers of the witch house genre and visual aesthetics. They blend gothic aesthetics, distorted hip-hop beats, and experimental synths. The project is known for its dark, cinematic, and esoteric style, often collaborating with various artists.

Cosmotropia, is also known as the founder of Phantasma Disques label, a recognized witch house label. The label has released hundreds of albums in physical format since 2010.

== Discography ==
=== Studio albums ===
- Second Coming
- Crack Witch
- Annodamonna - The Witch Album
- π
- House Of The Witches
- Inverted Triangle I
- Inverted Triangle II
- Paracusia (Crack Witch 2)
- Inverted Triangle III
- Süsyphüs Concrëte
- Serenity
- Discoteca Droga (featuring Carmen Incarnadine)
- Hollywood Necronomicon
- Atem
- Malacreanza
- Surrealistica Uniferno
- Serenity 2 (Stigmata Of Eden)
- Antropophagus
- Schwarze Messe Des Gehirns
- Phantasmagoria
- Hexensabbat
- Scanners
- Hotel Trancesylvania
- Cinemagoria
- Siamnesia

=== EPs/Singles ===
- Exorcism Of The Hippies
- Seduction Of The Armageddon Witches
- Inside The Brain Of Miss Lennon's Tongue (featuring Crisne)
- La Bocca È La Tana Del Bianco Coniglio (featuring Shivabel)
- Il Labirinto Del Sesso EP
- Fantasia 2 (split with How I Quit Crack and Pwin Teaks)
- Antropophagus (The Giallo Disco Remixes)
- Trauma I EP

=== Live recordings ===
- Live In London (featuring Carmen Incarnadine)
- Live In Milan (featuring Delila Muerte)
- Live In Los Angeles

=== Compilations ===
- Ultra Rare Trax
- 超レア·トラック (Ultra Rare Trax 2012)
- Ultra Rare Trax III
- Inverted Triangle I-III
- The Singles 2010-2015

=== Other ===
- On TV
- Vogue Witch
- Ghost Drone Remixes (collection of official remixes of Crossover)
- Hoüse Öv Drüg: The Drüghoüse Tapes
- Crack Witch (The Ghost Drone Remixes)
- Droga 39
- Paracusia Sessions
- Split (split with fromrussiawithaids)
- Tarot Box
- Serenity Tour CDR
- Zombie Rave
- Seduction Of The Armageddon Witches
- The ATEM Modifications
- SPUK
- Dysnomia
