= Sex Week at Yale =

Biennial event at Yale College

Sex Week at Yale was a biennial event described on its website as "an interdisciplinary sex education program designed to pique students' interest through creative, interactive, and exciting programming". It was originally organized in 2002 by then Yale College students Eric Rubenstein and Jacqueline Farber. It aimed to explore love, sex, intimacy and relationships by focusing on how sexuality is manifested in America, helping students to reconcile these issues in their own lives. The week gave students access to professionals both in the classroom and during informal events, including debates, seminars, fashion shows, concerts, and discussions.

== History ==
In 2002, Eric Rubens approached Jacqueline Farber, head of Student Health Education division of Yale Health Services, which conducted the sexual health orientations for freshmen and which had previously given sexual health talks around Valentine's Day, with the idea of hosting a campus-wide event including guest speakers and other sexual health events. With the Student Health Education's support, other groups, such as the Women's Center and the Lesbian, Gay, Bisexual and Transgender Co-op, agreed to co-sponsor the project, and Sex Week at Yale was born. The event was composed of talks by a number of Yale professors, a series of talks by Yale's peer health educators, a film festival and a celebrity panel entitled "Sex and Entertainment". Sex Week at Yale takes a multi-disciplinary approach, enlisting a diversity of speakers from company executives, to sex therapists, to professors, clergy, adult film stars, and everyone in between.

In February 2006, nearly 25,000 copies of Sex Week at Yale: The Magazine were distributed among 18 of the country's best-known universities, including all schools in the Ivy League. The magazine's contributors included Jim Griffiths, President of the Playboy Entertainment Group, and John Gray. Also in 2006 Yale received a perfect score by Sperling's BestPlaces on the annual Campus Sexual Health Report Card for Trojan; the report noted that Sex Week at Yale "promotes open on-campus discussion of sex and relationships, and makes information about sexual health easily accessible online and through the student health center".

In February 2010, Sasha Grey and Joanna Angel were Sex Week at Yale panelists. In the fall of 2011, a group of Yale students formed an organization called Undergraduates for a Better Yale College (UBCY), to "...advocate for a better sexual culture, one grounded in genuine respect and self-giving love; to oppose campus attitudes and events that offer a degrading and trivializing vision of sexuality... ." In September 2011, UBCY petitioned the Yale administration to deny Sex Week at Yale support, including the use of classrooms and other university facilities.

In 2012, Yale alumnus Nathan Harden published Sex and God at Yale: Porn, Political Correctness, and a Good Education Gone Bad. The book was highly critical of Sex Week. Its title alluded to the criticism of Yale that William F. Buckley, Jr. made in 1951 with his book God and Man at Yale.

In February, 2012, Sex Week was organized by an executive board of directors for the first time. Directors included seniors Allie Bauer, Paul Holmes, Tatiana Lam, and Courtney Peters and juniors Connie Cho, Alberto Navarro, Anna North, and Leeron Tur-Kaspa. The ten-day program contained over fifty events, all of which were funded by grassroots efforts given the newly imposed restriction on corporate sponsorship.

== Other Sex Weeks ==
- University of Maryland
- Harvard University
- University of Tennessee Knoxville
- University of North Carolina Charlotte
- Brown University
- University of Calgary
- Emory University
- University of Chicago
- Northwestern University
- University of Kentucky
- University of Michigan
- The Ohio State University

Safer Sex Weeks were held at University of Minnesota in February 2014 and at Oberlin College in November 2013. The Campus Health Service at Arizona State University held a SexTalk week in February 2013. The University Health Centre of the University of the West Indies, Mona presented a Safer Sex Week on February 12–18, 2012, emphasizing, on different days, the themes of Abstinence, Be faithful, and Condomize.
