= Chelsea Wolfe =

American singer-songwriter (born 1983)

- Wolfe performing in 2024

Background information
- Born: Chelsea Joy Wolfe; November 14, 1983 (age 42); Roseville, California, U.S.
- Origin: Sacramento, California, U.S.
- Genres: Folk; doom metal; gothic rock; experimental; noise
- Occupations: Singer-songwriter; record producer; musician
- Instruments: Vocals; guitar; piano
- Years active: 2006–present
- Labels: Loma Vista; Pendu; Sargent House; Southern
- Website: chelseawolfe.net

Chelsea Joy Wolfe (born November 14, 1983) is an American singer-songwriter and musician. Her work blends elements of gothic rock, doom metal, and folk.

Growing up in Northern California with a country musician father, Wolfe began writing and recording songs during her childhood. She began to earn recognition for her albums The Grime and the Glow (2010) and Apokalypsis (2011), which blended gothic and folk elements. In her next few albums Pain Is Beauty (2013), Abyss (2015) and Hiss Spun (2017) Wolfe incorporated elements of neofolk, electronic music and heavy metal. Her evolution continued with Birth of Violence (2019), She Reaches Out to She Reaches Out to She (2024) and The Dark (2026).

In addition to her solo career, she has collaborated with the band Converge on the album Bloodmoon: I (2021) and composer Tyler Bates on the soundtrack to the 2022 film X. She has also featured on songs by artists including Russian Circles, Deafheaven, Myrkur and Xiu Xiu.

== Early life ==
Wolfe was born in Roseville, California, (Note: Some sources erroneously state Wolfe was born in Sacramento, but the California Birth Index lists her birthplace as Placer County; Sacramento is located in Sacramento County, not Placer County. Furthermore, a 2015 profile on Wolfe from a Sacramento online magazine states she is from Roseville, which is located in Placer County.) near Sacramento, and raised in both towns. She is of English, Norwegian, Swedish, and German descent. Her father was in a country band and owned a home studio. Wolfe lived with her grandmother during a part of her childhood, who taught her about aromatherapy, Reiki and "other realms".

By the age of 7, she had written her first poem, and by the age of 9, had written and recorded songs which she later described as "basically Casio-based gothy R&B songs".

Of her childhood, Wolfe said, "I grew up pretty fast. I had older sisters. By the time I was 11, I was drinking 40s." She struggled with sleep paralysis as a child and through her teens, which landed her in the hospital for sleep studies; these experiences eventually became material for her albums Abyss and Hiss Spun.

== Career ==
=== 2006: Mistake in Parting ===
In 2006, Wolfe composed an album, titled Mistake in Parting, which was never officially released. Of the album, Wolfe said: "I was 21 years old and wrote a shitty singer-songwriter breakup album. I didn't even really want to be a musician back then, but a lot of my friends were like 'let's do this, I've got some producer friends' and they helped me make this over-produced, terrible record... I sort of took a break from music for a while since I wasn't happy with what I was making". Wolfe later commented that she scrapped the album largely because it had been written about events in her personal life: "I was writing really personal stuff about my own life, and I didn't feel comfortable at all... I didn't want [my music] to be so much about myself, and I just had to find a new perspective".

=== 2010–2012: The Grime and the Glow and Apokalypsis ===
Wolfe's first widely released album, The Grime and the Glow (2010), was issued on New York-based independent label Pendu Sound Recordings, preceded that same year by the limited-edition albums Soundtrack VHS/Gold and Soundtrack VHS II. Her 2010 cover of Burzum's "Black Spell of Destruction" helped her receive her first exposure after it was highlighted in a notable blog. Her next album, Apokalypsis (2011), stylized as Ἀποκάλυψις, gained her an underground following, as well as critical acclaim, receiving favorable reviews in Pitchfork and CMJ. Wolfe toured extensively in North America and Europe to support both albums, and suffered from extreme stage fright; when she initially began performing live, Wolfe would wear a black veil over her face. "Performing was something that I had to learn," she said. "I could barely handle being onstage for the first few years, and it's the reason it took me so long to start my career as a musician".

=== 2012–2022: Sargent House ===
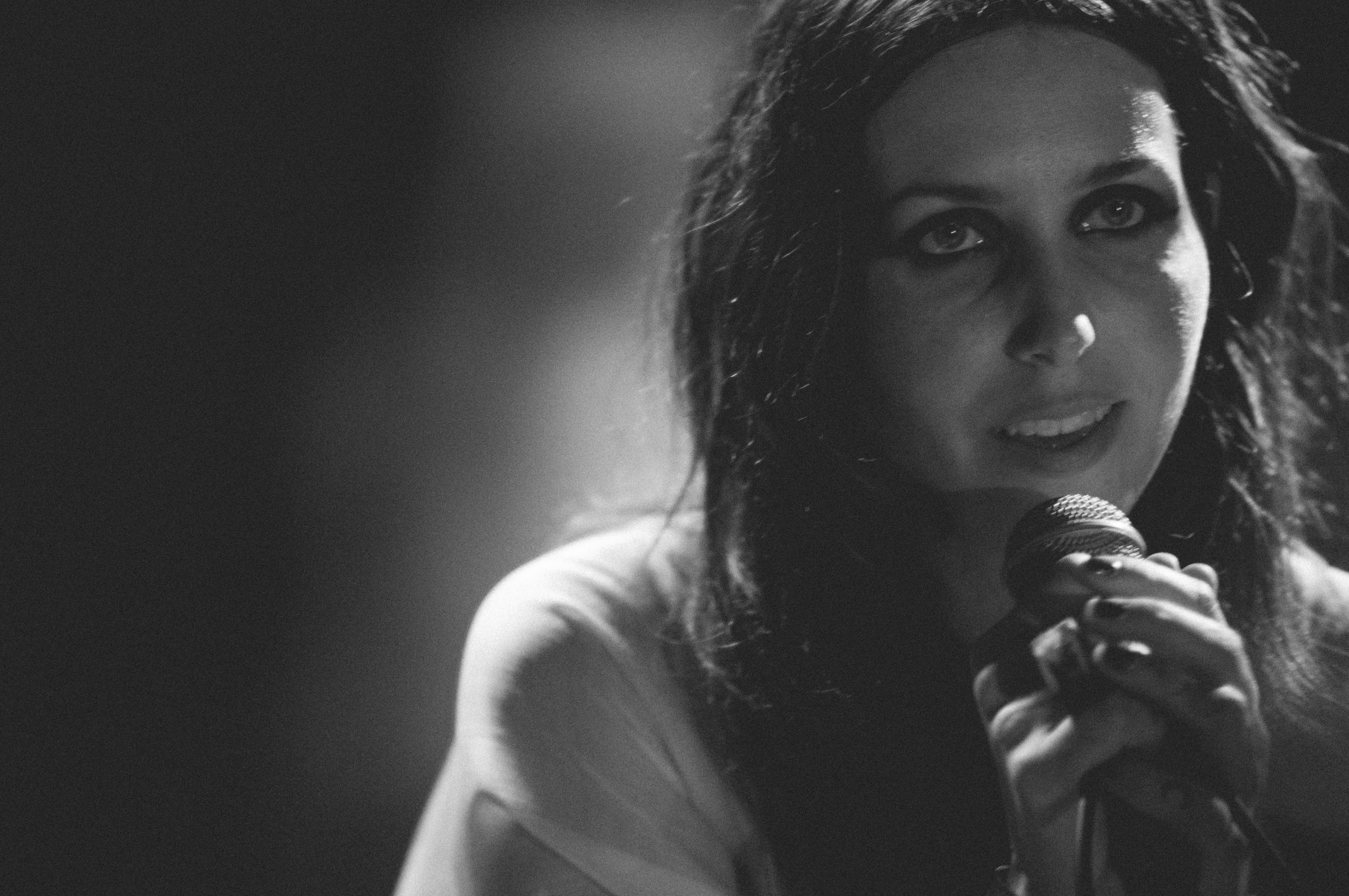
Wolfe performing San Francisco, California, 2013

In 2012, Wolfe covered five songs by British anarcho-punk band Rudimentary Peni, and issued them as A Tribute To Rudimentary Peni on February 17 as a free download via Pendu Sound. She later rerecorded the Peni songs with her band at Southern Studios in London, and released them as an EP, Prayer for the Unborn, in January 2013 on Southern Records.

Wolfe signed with the label Sargent House in 2012 to release her third album. Unknown Rooms: A Collection of Acoustic Songs was released on October 16, 2012, and featured a more folk-oriented sound, as opposed to her earlier work, which had been heavily centered on droning electric guitars and distortion. The acoustic album contained "'once-orphaned' songs", according to Wolfe. On July 28, 2012, the first single, "The Way We Used To", was premiered on NPR. On September 20, the second single, "Appalachia," was premiered on The Fader.

Wolfe released a live album, Live at Roadburn, on September 28, 2012, recorded that April 12 at the Roadburn Festival in Tilburg, Netherlands. Wolfe's fourth studio album, Pain Is Beauty, was released September 3, 2013, as well as an album trailer, followed by a supporting North American tour. During 2013 and 2014, Wolfe released two split 7-inch singles with King Dude, Sing Songs Together... and Sing More Songs Together..., and a live EP, Chelsea Wolfe Folkadelphia Session May 31, 2014.

Wolfe also contributed guest vocals to the American post-metal band Russian Circles' fifth studio album, Memorial, released in October 2013. Wolfe and Russian Circles toured Europe together in late 2013.

In 2014, she released a long-form film, Lone, featuring music from Pain Is Beauty and directed by Mark Pellington.

"Carrion Flowers", "Iron Moon" and "After the Fall" were released as the second, third and the fourth singles, respectively, from her fourth album, Abyss (2015). Abyss featured Wolfe exploring neofolk and electronic music and embracing more of her heavy metal influences.

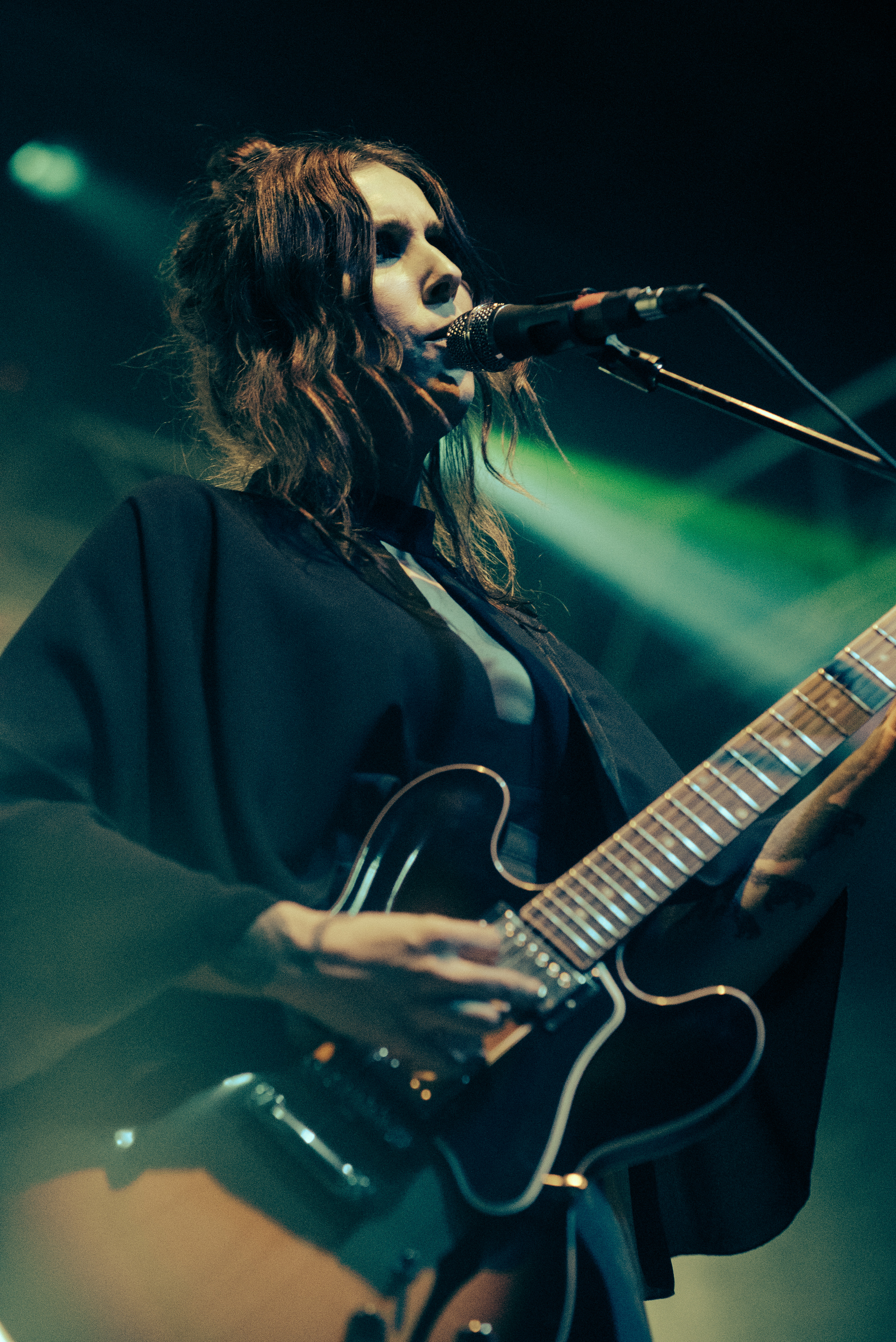
Wolfe performing in 2016.

On April 1, 2016, Wolfe released the non-album 7-inch single "Hypnos", preceded by a music video on March 22. In January 2017, she announced a UK/European tour to begin in April.

Her fifth studio album, Hiss Spun, was released by Sargent House on September 22, 2017. The album featured guitar work from Queens of the Stone Age member Troy Van Leeuwen, was recorded by Kurt Ballou and features a guest appearance from Aaron Turner. She toured in late 2017 to promote its release. Wolfe also appeared in collaborations on the 2017 Myrkur album Mareridt and the 2018 Deafheaven album Ordinary Corrupt Human Love.

In March 2019, she revealed that her upcoming album will be largely acoustic, is being recorded in the woods of Northern California, and inspired by current events. Longtime collaborator Ben Chisholm co-produced the album, featuring some guest players such as drummer Jess Gowrie. On June 18, 2019, Wolfe announced her sixth studio album, Birth of Violence and released the first single off the album, "The Mother Road". The album was released on September 13, 2019.

In January 2021, Wolfe chose to get sober and teamed up with Emma Ruth Rundle for the single "Anhedonia" released digitally via Wolfe's Bandcamp store. In March 2021, Wolfe teamed with Xiu Xiu to cover the song "One Hundred Years" by The Cure for Xiu Xiu's duets album Oh No. On May 26, 2021, "Diana," a collaboration between Wolfe, bandmates Ben Chisholm and Jess Gowrie, and Tyler Bates was released as a part of the Dark Nights: Death Metal soundtrack. On September 21, 2021, Wolfe released the B-Side of her sixth studio album, Birth of Violence, featuring the previously unreleased track "Green Altar" and a cover of Joni Mitchell's "Woodstock." A documentary detailing the 2019 tour was released alongside it.

On November 19, 2021, Bloodmoon: I, a collaborative album comprising Wolfe and metalcore band Converge was released. The album also includes contributions from long-time Converge collaborator Stephen Brodsky of Cave In, and Ben Chisholm. The project originated from a performance at the Netherlands’ Roadburn Festival in 2016, where Wolfe and Converge performed a set of reworked Converge songs under the moniker Blood Moon.

=== 2023–present: She Reaches Out to She Reaches Out to She and The Dark ===
On September 20, 2023, Wolfe announced that she had signed with Loma Vista Recordings, and released her debut single with the label, "Dusk". On October 24, she announced her eighth album, She Reaches Out to She Reaches Out to She, and released the second single, "Whispers in the Echo Chamber". The album was released on February 9, 2024, to positive reception. Wolfe toured the album throughout the year, including appearances at European festivals including Roadburn, Primavera Sound and Hellfest. She accompanied the album with the Undone EP of remixes and the Unbound EP of acoustic versions. On May 4, 2025, Wolfe teamed up with the industrial/noise rock band Health for their collaborative single "Mean".

On June 23, 2026 Wolfe released two new songs, "The Dark" and "Death Is Not The End," and announced The Dark World Tour. She released "Cold" in July 2026 as a single for her album The Dark, which was released on August 21, 2026.

== Collaborations ==
=== Converge ===
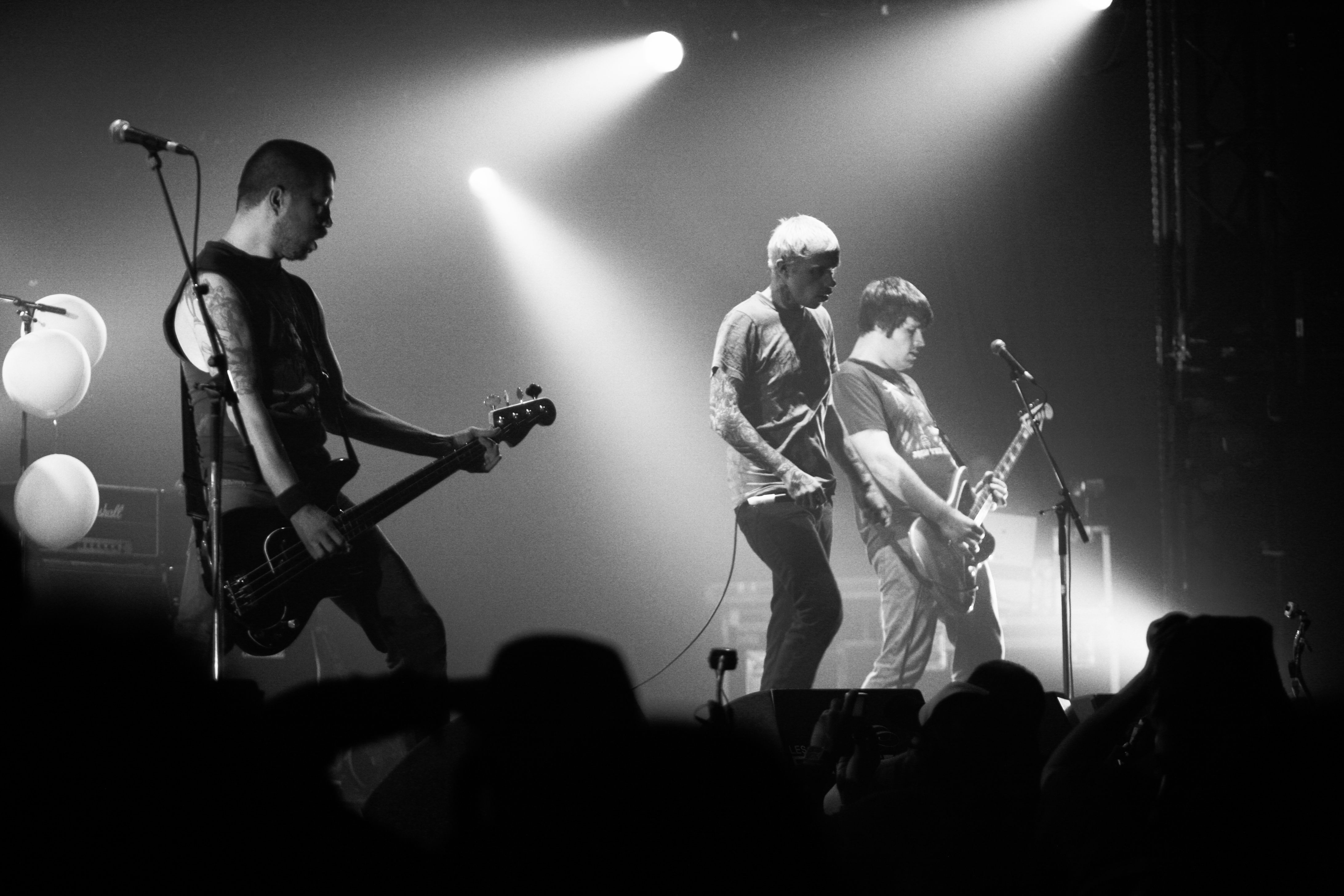
Wolfe collaborated with Converge for their album Bloodmoon: I.

In April 2016, Wolfe and bandmate Ben Chisholm were special guests for Converge's collaborative live performance, Blood Moon, along with Stephen Brodsky of Cave In and Steve Von Till of Neurosis. Limited to four European performances, the collective performed "ambient/post-rock interpretations" of various tracks from Converge's discography, particularly songs of their "lesser-heard and slower work". The first Blood Moon set took place at Postbahnhof in Berlin on April 11. The second took place at La Cartonnerie in Reims on April 12. The third took place at Electric Brixton in London on April 13. The fourth and final Blood Moon show took place at the Roadburn Festival in the Netherlands on April 16. On September 28, 2021, Converge announced that the band and Chelsea Wolfe had collaborated again for the former's tenth studio album Bloodmoon: I, released on November 19, 2021.

=== Mrs. Piss ===
On May 14, 2020, Wolfe and her friend and drummer Jess Gowrie announced their collaborative project Mrs. Piss and their debut album, Self-Surgery with release date on May 29, 2020, through Sargent House.

=== X soundtrack ===
In March 2022, film production house A24 announced Wolfe's soundtrack album for the slasher film X. Her cover of "Oui, Oui, Marie" by Arthur Fields was released as a single ahead of the album. The soundtrack involved Wolfe collaborating with composer Tyler Bates, and primary providing vocals for the synthesizer and 1970s-music inspired score.

== Equipment ==
She composed her first two albums on her mother's classical guitar, which was missing a tuning peg; as a result, the strings had to be tuned down, which was a stylistic element carried on to the studio recordings. Wolfe frequently plays both a 1979 and 2014 Gibson ES-335, which she used while recording her album Hiss Spun. In a 2017 interview, she said that her 2014 Gibson ES-335 was "the best guitar I’ve ever had—every time I pick it up, I want to play it forever." She also performs using several Fender guitars, including a Jazzmaster with a Stratocaster neck, and a Mustang with a Dean neck.

For amplifiers, she has used a 1960s-era Gibson Titan, a 1970s-era Laney Klipp, and a Fender Bassbreaker 45.

== Musical style and influences ==
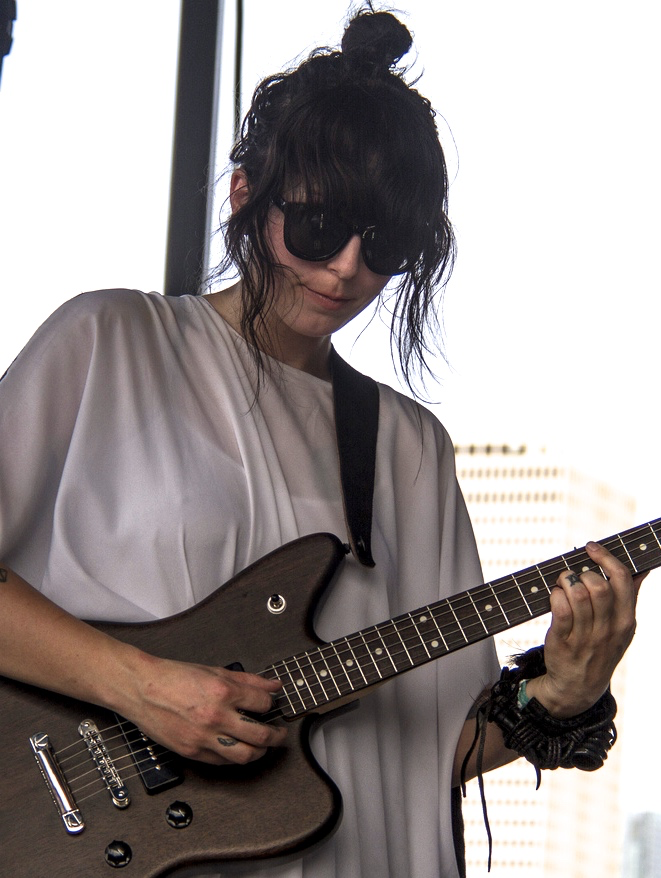
Wolfe performing live, 2012

Wolfe has mentioned an array of artists and genres as influences, including black metal and Scandinavian folk music, but has said: "I do have a hard time sticking to one genre, and honestly I prefer it that way. I'd rather be free to experiment and make the kind of art I want to make than be easy to define." Various critics have noted elements of doom metal, drone metal, gothic rock, folk, lo-fi, electronic, noise, and dark ambient in her music. Aside from gothic and experimental, many critics have dubbed her sound "doom folk". Wolfe has said: "I think deep down I wish I had one of those really gritty voices like Kurt Cobain, so maybe I'm making up for it with distorted guitars." Wolfe has been noted as having a soprano vocal range. Mojo described her music as "Siouxsie & The Banshees territory [...], with treated strings, echoing drums and lashings of reverb surrounding her double-tracked, crushed velvet voice".

Wolfe has expressed a strong affinity for R&B music, citing Aaliyah as a huge influence on her career since her childhood. She said, "I grew up listening to my dad playing guitar while singing harmonies... As a kid I wanted to record my own songs so he set me up with an 8-track. The vibe of those earliest songs was like, Aaliyah meets Fleetwood Mac – what I was listening to mixed with what my parents were listening to. "Age Ain't Nothing But a Number" was my favorite song back then."

Other musical influences include Vladimir Vysotsky, Selda Bagcan, Nick Cave, Hank Williams, Townes Van Zandt, Suicide, SPK, various "1920s and '30s music", Joy Division, and more recently, Black Sabbath, Sunn O))), Deftones, and Neurosis. In the past she mentioned Burzum as an influence, but later said that she considers Burzum's political views as too extreme.

Wolfe has cited the visual elements of filmmaker Ingmar Bergman and photographer Nan Goldin as influences, as well as the writings of D.H. Lawrence and Ayn Rand. However, on September 24, 2015, she stated that with regard to her supposed affinity with Rand: "When I said I liked Ayn Rand many years ago I didn't know anything about what she stood for or what her books meant. I recant!". Other writers she has mentioned as inspirations include Marcel Proust, Louis-Ferdinand Céline and Sylvia Plath.

Since 2011, Wolfe has worked with New York-based costume designer and wardrobe stylist Jenni Hensler, whom she credits with helping her cultivate and develop her own original image. Hensler's costumes and styling work can be seen both in Wolfe's live performances and music videos, most recently in the video for "Be All Things."

== Discography ==
=== Studio albums ===
- The Grime and the Glow (2010)
- Apokalypsis (2011)
- Pain Is Beauty (2013)
- Abyss (2015)
- Hiss Spun (2017)
- Birth of Violence (2019)
- Bloodmoon: I (2021; collaboration with Converge)
- She Reaches Out to She Reaches Out to She (2024)
- The Dark (2026)

=== Compilation albums ===
- Soundtrack VHS/Gold (2010, Jeune Été)
- Unknown Rooms: A Collection of Acoustic Songs (2012, Sargent House)

=== Live albums ===
- Live at Roadburn (2012, Roadburn Records)

=== Singles and EPs ===
- "Advice & Vices" digital single (2010, Pendu Sound Recordings)
- "Prayer for the Unborn" EP (2013, Southern Records)
- "Sing Songs Together..." split 7-inch single with King Dude (2013, Sargent House)
- "Sing More Songs Together..." split 7-inch single with King Dude (2014, Not Just Religious Music)
- "Chelsea Wolfe Folkadelphia Session May 31, 2014" digital EP (2014, Folkadelphia)
- "Iron Moon" digital single (2015, Sargent House)
- "Carrion Flowers" digital single (2015, Sargent House)
- "After the Fall" digital single (2015, Sargent House)
- "Hypnos" 7-inch single (2016, Sargent House)
- "16 Psyche" digital single (2017, Sargent House)
- "Vex" digital single (2017, Sargent House)
- "Offering" digital single (2017, Sargent House)
- "The Culling" digital single (2017, Sargent House)
- "Be All Things" digital single (2019, Sargent House)
- "The Mother Road" digital single (2019, Sargent House)
- "American Darkness" digital single (2019, Sargent House)
- "Deranged for Rock & Roll" digital single (2019, Sargent House)
- "Woodstock / Green Altar" (2021, Sargent House)
- "Dusk" (2023, Loma Vista)
- "Whispers in the Echo Chamber" (2023, Loma Vista)
- "Tunnel Lights" (2023, Loma Vista)
- "Everything Turns Blue" (2024, Loma Vista)
- "Undone" EP (2024, Loma Vista)
- "Unbound" EP (2024, Loma Vista)
- "The Dark" (2026, Loma Vista)
- "Death Is Not The End" (2026, Loma Vista)
- "Cold" (2026, Loma Vista)
- "Seethe" (2026, Loma Vista)

=== Music videos ===
| Year | Title |
|---|---|
| 2014 | "Feral Love" |
| 2014 | "Kings" |
| 2015 | "Carrion Flowers" |
| 2016 | "Hypnos" |
| 2017 | "16 Psyche" |
| 2017 | "Spun" |
| 2018 | "The Culling" |
| 2018 | "Scrape" |
| 2019 | "American Darkness" |
| 2019 | "Be All Things" |
| 2019 | "Deranged for Rock & Roll" |
| 2020 | "Highway" |
| 2023 | "Whispers In The Echo Chambers" |
| 2023 | "Tunnel Lights" |
| 2024 | "Everything Turns Blue" |
| 2025 | "Place In The Sun (Unbound)" |
| 2026 | "Cold" |

=== With Mrs. Piss ===
- Self-Surgery (2020)

== Band members ==
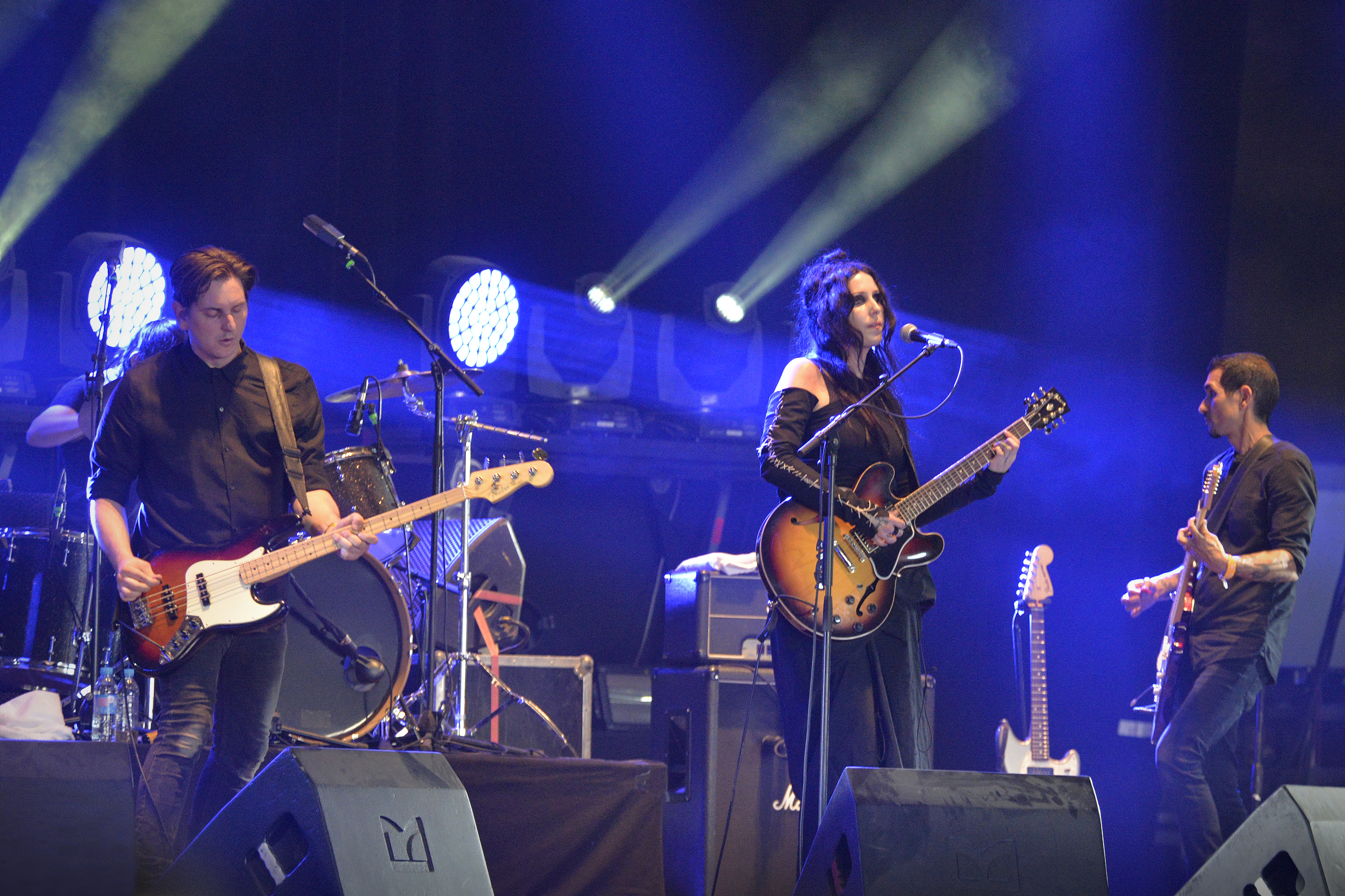
Wolfe performing with her backing band at Hellfest in 2017

Current

- Chelsea Wolfe – vocals, guitars (2009–present)
- Ben Chisholm – synth, piano, electronics (2009–present) bass (2012–present)
- Lia Braswell - drums (2026–present)
- Bryan Tulao – lead guitars (2017–present)

Past

- Kevin Dockter – lead guitars (2009–2015)
- Addison Quarles – bass (2009–2012)
- Drew Walker – drums (2009–2012)
- Dylan Fujioka – drums (2012–2017)
- Jess Gowrie – drums (2017–2026)
- Mike Sullivan – lead guitars (2015–2016)
- Aurielle Zeitler – lead guitars (2016–2017)

Touring & session

- Fred Sablan – bass
- Troy Van Leeuwen – guitars
- Andrea Calderon – violin
- Ezra Buchla – viola
