= The Dark (Chelsea Wolfe album) =

Studio album by Chelsea Wolfe
- Released: August 21, 2026
- Length: 40:26
- Label: Loma Vista
- Producers: Chelsea Wolfe; Ben Chisholm; Jennifer Decilveo

Chelsea Wolfe chronology
Unbound EP (2024)	The Dark (2026)

Singles from The Dark
- 1. "Death Is Not the End" / "The Dark" Released: June 23, 2026; 2. "Cold" Released: July 21, 2026; 3. "Seethe" Released: August 17, 2026

The Dark is the ninth studio album by the American singer-songwriter Chelsea Wolfe. It was released on August 21, 2026, through Loma Vista Recordings. It was preceded by the singles "The Dark", "Death Is Not the End", and the lead single "Cold".

The album was written by Wolfe alongside longtime collaborator Ben Chisholm and songwriter Jennifer Decilveo. Additional contributions come from Robin Finck, Justin Meldal-Johnsen, Matt Chamberlain, Stella Mozgawa, and members of Kælan Mikla.

== Background and promotion ==
Following the release of She Reaches Out to She Reaches Out to She and its companion Undone and Unbound EPs in 2024, Wolfe began work on new material with longtime collaborator Ben Chisholm. Songwriter and producer Jennifer Decilveo also joined the creative process, marking one of Wolfe's most collaborative studio projects to date. Work on the album began in 2024, with initial sessions between Wolfe and Decilveo taking place in Los Angeles. Wolfe described the writing as "really quickly and easily", citing their shared experience as women of the same age in the music industry as a factor in their connection. Wolfe announced the album on July 21, 2026, alongside promotional visuals depicting her in a "foggy wilderness".

On June 23, 2026, Wolfe released the dual singles "Death Is Not the End" and "The Dark", the latter serving as the album's title track. Describing the songs, Revolver writer Gregory Adams called "Death Is Not the End" a "transformatory track" featuring Wolfe's "gently whispered vocal", while noting that "The Dark" "begins airily" before building to an "explosive finale". Upon announcing the album on July 21, 2026, Wolfe simultaneously released its third single, "Cold". In support of the album, Wolfe is set to embark on a North American tour in September and October 2026.

== Critical reception ==
Professional ratings
Aggregate scores
Source	Rating
Any Decent Music	7.4/10
Metacritic	79/100
Review scores
Source	Rating

On Any Decent Music, the album has a weighted average score of 7.4 out of 10 from six critic scores. According to the review aggregator Metacritic, The Dark received "generally favorable reviews" based on a weighted average score of 79 out of 100 from 5 critic scores.

== Track listing ==
All lyrics are written by Chelsea Wolfe, except where noted.

The Dark track listing
No.	Title	Lyrics	Music	Length
1.	"Cold"	Chelsea Wolfe; Jennifer Decilveo	Wolfe; Decilveo	4:31
2.	"Seethe"		Wolfe; Ben Chisholm; Decilveo	3:17
3.	"Humours"		Wolfe; Chisholm; Decilveo	3:53
4.	"Swallower"		Wolfe; Chisholm; Decilveo	4:04
5.	"Halo"		Wolfe; Chisholm	3:32
6.	"The Dark"	Wolfe; Ben Babbitt; Chisholm; Decilveo	Wolfe; Babbitt; Chisholm; Decilveo	3:33
7.	"Turn the Key"		Wolfe; Chisholm	4:24
8.	"I'm Not There"		Wolfe; Chisholm; Decilveo	4:15
9.	"Death Is Not the End"	Wolfe; Chisholm; Decilveo	Wolfe; Chisholm; Decilveo	4:26
10.	"Dancer in the Sky"		Wolfe; Chisholm; Decilveo	4:31
Total length:				40:26

== Personnel ==
Credits adapted from Tidal.

- Chelsea Wolfe – vocals, production (all tracks); acoustic guitar (track 1), bass guitar (2), guitar (6–8)
- Ben Chisholm – production, synthesizer (all tracks); bass guitar (1, 5, 9); electric guitar, mandolin (1); guitar (2–9), programming (2–7, 9, 10), piano (2, 3, 5), vocals (6, 8)
- Jennifer Decilveo – production (all tracks), piano (1, 4, 6, 8–10), synthesizer (3, 4, 9), programming (3, 4)
- Marta Salogni – mixing
- Ruairi O'Flaherty – mastering
- Sean Cook – engineering (1), additional engineering (2–10)
- Sam Kauffman-Skloff – drums (1)
- Derek Coburn – engineering (2–10)
- Matt Chamberlain – drums (2–4, 7, 9)
- Troy Van Leeuwen – guitar (2, 4)
- Sam KS – percussion (2)
- Justin Meldal-Johnsen – bass guitar (3, 4, 6–8, 10)
- Robin Finck – guitar (3, 7–9)
- Kælan Mikla – additional vocals (3)
- Stella Mozgawa – drums (5, 6, 8)
- Laena Myers – violin (10)

== Charts ==
Chart performance for The Dark
Chart (2026)	Peak position
Australian Albums (ARIA)	90
Austrian Albums (Ö3 Austria)	58
Belgian Albums (Ultratop Flanders)	98
Belgian Albums (Ultratop Wallonia)	82
Danish Vinyl Albums (Hitlisten)	32
French Physical Albums (SNEP)	53
French Rock & Metal Albums (SNEP)	26
German Albums (Offizielle Top 100)	37
Scottish Albums (Official Charts)	20
Swiss Albums (Schweizer Hitparade)	59
UK Albums Sales (Official Charts)	32
US Top Album Sales (Billboard)	28
