= Birth of Violence =

- Physical cover. Digital editions exclude Wolfe's name.

Studio album by Chelsea Wolfe
- Released: September 13, 2019
- Genre: Folk
- Length: 43:46
- Label: Sargent House

Chelsea Wolfe chronology
Hiss Spun (2017)	Birth of Violence (2019)	Bloodmoon: I (2021)

Singles from Birth of Violence
- 1. "The Mother Road" Released: June 18, 2019; 2. "American Darkness" Released: July 17, 2019; 3. "Deranged For Rock and Roll" Released: September 5, 2019; 4. "Highway" Released: March 4, 2020

Professional ratings
Aggregate scores
Source	Rating
AnyDecentMusic?	7.8/10
Metacritic	81/100
Review scores
Source	Rating
AllMusic	4/5 stars
The A.V. Club	B-
Austin Chronicle	3.5/5 stars
Consequence of Sound	B+
Exclaim!	8/10
Paste	9/10
Sputnikmusic	4.1/5
Under the Radar	7.5/10

Birth of Violence is the sixth studio album by American singer-songwriter Chelsea Wolfe. Announced on June 18, 2019, the first single, "The Mother Road", was released the same day. The second single, "American Darkness", was released on July 17.

The album was written and recorded in seclusion at her home in Northern California, with Wolfe describing it as having more of a "folk leaning sound" in an effort to return to her folk roots. It was released by Sargent House on September 13, 2019.

== Accolades ==
Publication	Accolade	Rank	Ref.
Gigwise	Top 51 Albums of 2019	22	
Kerrang!	Top 50 Albums of 2019	21	
Revolver	Top 25 Albums of 2019	13	

== Track listing ==
All tracks are written by Chelsea Wolfe

No.	Title	Length
1.	"The Mother Road"	4:20
2.	"American Darkness"	4:48
3.	"Birth of Violence"	4:20
4.	"Deranged for Rock & Roll"	3:31
5.	"Be All Things"	4:20
6.	"Erde"	3:31
7.	"When Anger Turns to Honey"	3:09
8.	"Dirt Universe"	4:36
9.	"Little Grave"	3:22
10.	"Preface to a Dream Play"	3:52
11.	"Highway"	2:50
12.	"The Storm"	1:07
Total length:		43:46

Japan bonus track
No.	Title	Length
12.	"Night of the Vampire (Roky Erickson cover)"	2:50
Total length:		46:45

== Personnel ==
Credits adapted from Discogs.

- Chelsea Wolfe - vocals, guitar, production
- Ben Chisholm - guitar, bass guitar, synthesizers, piano, mandolin, production, mixing
- Jess Gowrie - drums (tracks 1, 2, 4-7, 9)
- Ezra Buchla - viola (tracks 1, 2, 5, 10)
- Heba Kadry - mastering
- John Crawford - art direction, photography
- Nona Limmen - cover
- Cathy Pellow - management

== Charts ==
Chart (2019)	Peak position
Australian Digital Albums (ARIA)	18
Belgian Albums (Ultratop Wallonia)	162
German Albums (Offizielle Top 100)	84
Scottish Albums (Official Charts)	77
Swiss Albums (Schweizer Hitparade)	60
US Americana/Folk Albums (Billboard)	10
US Independent Albums (Billboard)	5
