= Pendu Sound Recordings =

NYC Record label by Todd "Pendu" Brooks

- Founded: 2005
- Founder: Todd "Pendu" Brooks
- Defunct: 2013
- Genre: Witch house; industrial; gothic metal; punk jazz
- Country of origin: U.S.
- Location: New York City
- Official website: www.pendusound.com

Pendu Sound Recordings was an independent record label used by aTelecine, Chelsea Wolfe, Azar Swan, Mater Suspiria Vision, White Ring, Talibam!, Von Haze, and others.

The label, also known as Pendu Sound, was started by Todd Brooks in 2005 for his PENDV projects and went defunct in 2013. The parent company Pendu NYC was known for its "Pendu Disco" dance parties.

== History ==
The Pendu Sound compilation album Getting rid of the glue with Excepter and Daniel Carter was listed as number 70 in Thurston Moore's "Top 80 of 2006". The White Ring Chaind Vol. 1 DJ mix released in August 2011 contains remixes of own tracks, NIИ, Rihanna, and others. Also in August the LP The Falcon and the Pod was released.

In May 2012 Pendu Sound joined forces with Frenchkiss Records as a member of the Frenchkiss Label Group, which published a compilation of their works. In November 2012 Noisey featured Todd Pendu. In February 2013 Pendu Sound launched a digital single series with the Tempers.

The Pendu Sound site still offers reviews, photos, videos, interviews, and other background material about their former artists.

== Notable albums ==
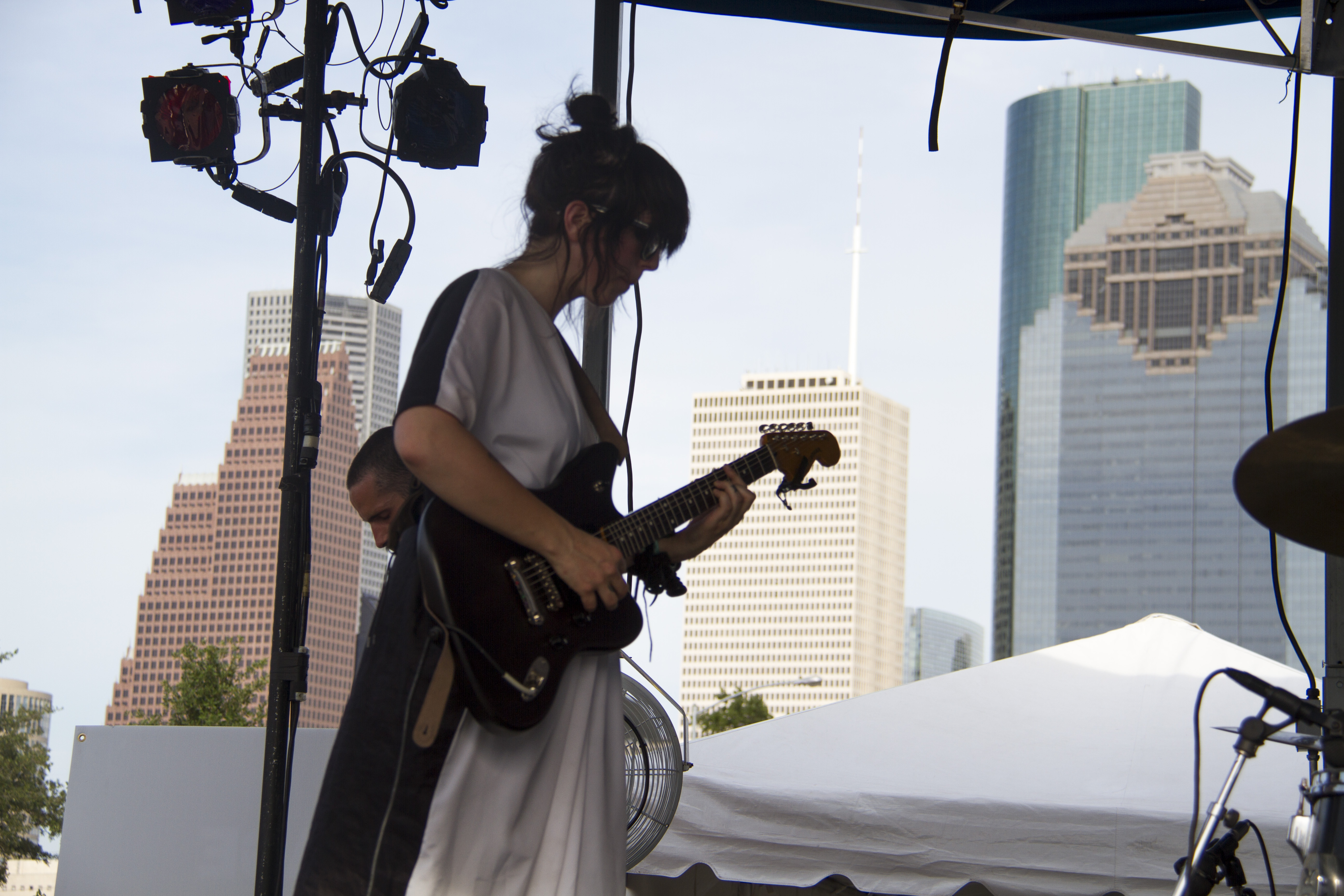
Chelsea Wolfe in 2012.

Chelsea Wolfe
2010: The Grime and the Glow
2011: Apokalypsis
aTelecine
2009: aVigillant Carpark
2010: A Cassette Tape Culture (Phase One)
2011: A Cassette Tape Culture (Phase Two)
2011: A Cassette Tape Culture (Phase Three)
2011: The Falcon and the Pod

== See also ==
- Sasha Grey
- The Orchard
