= Aleph at Hallucinatory Mountain =

Studio album by Current 93
- Released: 18 May 2009
- Genres: Experimental, doom metal, psychedelic
- Label: Coptic Cat

Professional ratings
Review scores
Source	Rating
Rock Sound	7/10 stars
Rockfeedback	4/5 stars
Pitchfork Media	(8.2/10)

Aleph at Hallucinatory Mountain is a studio album by the British experimental band Current 93, released in May 2009 on Coptic Cat Records. After collaborating with Om on a split EP, there is a notably heavy sound on this record, citing doom metal and stoner rock as influences. There was also a limited edition of the recording for subscribers who paid in advance including a second CD with a rough mix of the tracks and also a monophonic version that was released for the band's concert at German Wave Gotik Treffen 2009 with all of the tracks titled differently, though the music remains the same.

== Track listing ==
1. "Invocation of Almost" – 8:49
2. "Poppyskins" – 5:17
3. "On Docetic Mountain" – 8:14
4. "26 April 2007" – 5:13
5. "Aleph is the Butterfly Net" – 5:54
6. "Not Because the Fox Barks" – 10:14
7. "UrShadow" – 4:37
8. "As Real as Rainbows" – 5:23

== Personnel ==
- David Tibet – vocals, july guitar, gorgon guitar, mixing, production
- James Blackshaw – 12-string guitar, piano
- William Breeze – electric viola, viola controlled sampler
- Ossian Brown – synthesizers, treated organ, electronics
- John Contreras – cello, synthesizers
- Baby Dee – piano, hammond organ
- Andria Degens – vocals
- Sasha Grey – vocals
- Andrew Liles – electronics, guitars, mixing, production
- Alex Neilson – drums, percussion
- Rickie Lee Jones – vocals
- Alice Rousham – vocals
- Henry Rousham – vocals
- Steven Stapleton – electronics, mixing, production
- Matt Sweeney – electric guitar, vocals
- Andrew WK – bass, piano, vocals, finger bells
- Keith Wood – electric guitar, acoustic guitar, slide guitar, bass
