= Abyss (Chelsea Wolfe album) =

Studio album by Chelsea Wolfe
- Released: August 7, 2015
- Studios: Elmwood Recording Studio (Dallas, TX)
- Genres: Dark wave; gothic rock; folk; noise rock; industrial
- Length: 55:17
- Label: Sargent House
- Producers: John Congleton; Chelsea Wolfe

Chelsea Wolfe chronology
Pain Is Beauty (2013)	Abyss (2015)	Hiss Spun (2017)

Singles from Abyss
- 1. "Iron Moon" Released: April 28, 2015; 2. "Carrion Flowers" Released: June 2, 2015; 3. "After the Fall" Released: July 8, 2015

Abyss is the fourth studio album by American singer-songwriter and her eponymous band Chelsea Wolfe. The album was released on August 7, 2015 through Sargent House and was produced by John Congleton. It also features guest contributions from Mike Sullivan of Russian Circles and Dan Phillips from True Widow.

The album received positive reviews from music critics and peaked at No. 130 on the Billboard 200, becoming Wolfe's first album to enter the chart.

== Musical style ==
Nina Corcoran of Consequence of Sound described the album as "strik[ing] a fine balance between gothic folk and electronic noise rock" and "embracing metal and overpowering drones". Brandon Stosuy of Pitchfork noted that metallic elements are "built into, and integral to, the music, which frequently booms with distorted doom-metal guitar." Tristan Jones of Sputnikmusic wrote: "Though 'darkwave' is a fitting descriptor, elements of doom, folk, noise, and industrial seep in." Giuseppe Zevolli of Drowned in Sound associated the album with goth rock, writing that it "could appeal to fans of metal, folk, industrial and alternative rock in equal measure".

== Release and promotion ==
Abyss was initially announced through Chelsea Wolfe's website on January 8, 2015, with the news that it would be released via Sargent House. This was followed up by a more detailed announcement on April 22, 2015, with news of the album's collaborators: Ben Chisholm, Dylan Fujioka, Ezra Buchla, special guests Mike Sullivan (Russian Circles), Dan Phillips (True Widow) and the announcement of John Congleton as the album's producer. A trailer was also released to accompany the album's announcement.

Details of the album's tracklisting, as well as its cover art, were revealed by Rolling Stone on April 28. These details also coincided with the release of a clip for lead single "Iron Moon" and a statement from Wolfe regarding the song: "The music is co-written by our friend Karlos Ayala who wrote the song 'Boyfriend' we covered a few years back. Lyrically, this song was inspired after reading the poetry of a Foxconn worker who took his own life – his frustration and desperation. There's a blurry confusion throughout the lyrics on the album, as it sometimes is in dreams, like you're new to the afterlife and things are slightly different, more hazy and fluid. I imagine the quiet parts of the song sung from a small, dorm-style room, and the loud parts as a scene out of a musical, where the worker sings and dances through the factory lines with total freedom and abandon. Such a great crew of musicians came together to bring these feelings and sounds to life." Wolfe also discussed the album itself, describing it as "the feeling of when you're dreaming, and you briefly wake up, but then fall back asleep into the same dream, diving quickly into your own subconscious."

On June 2, "Carrion Flowers", premiered through NPR as the album's second single. Writer Lars Gotrich described the track as "dark and bottomless as a river at night" and "beautiful and terrifying."

Dates for the album's North American tour with alternative country band Wovenhand were announced on Wolfe's official website two days later. Additional dates for the European tour were announced on July 30. The news coincided with a link to an exclusive stream of the full album on NPR's website.

The final single from the album to be unveiled before its release was "After the Fall". The song was posted by Noisey on July 8. In a statement to coincide with the track's release, writer John Hill claimed that it displayed "both the delicate and world burning sides of Wolfe. The music itself feels otherworldly in its production, going to lengths to make everything nearly blissful. When the chorus kicks in, everything goes crashing into the earth at a million miles an hour, the distortion of the synth becoming more and more massive with each second. The electronic crunch is the kind of noise you'd probably hear at the last concert before the apocalypse. Her voice effortlessly goes back and forth between these two modes, reminding us why she's the best."

== Reception ==
Professional ratings
Aggregate scores
Source	Rating
AnyDecentMusic?	7.5/10
Metacritic	79/100
Review scores
Source	Rating
AllMusic	4/5 stars
The A.V. Club	B−
Financial Times	4/5 stars
The Irish Times	4/5 stars
Mojo	4/5 stars
Pitchfork	8.1/10
Record Collector	4/5 stars
Rolling Stone	3.5/5 stars
Spin	7/10
Uncut	8/10

Upon release, Abyss received generally positive reviews from contemporary music critics. At Metacritic, which assigns a normalized rating out of 100 to reviews from mainstream critics, the album received an average score of 79, based on 24 reviews, which indicates "generally favorable reviews".

In her review for AllMusic, Heather Phares declared that "On Abyss, Chelsea Wolfe brings the heaviness in her music to the fore in a way that's more natural, and more compelling, than merely "going metal." Given the darkness and drama present even on her unplugged album Unknown Rooms—as well as tours and collaborations with artists such as Russian Circles—it was inevitable that she'd embrace her metal leanings more fully, but Abyss exceeds expectations." Nina Corocran of Consequence of Sound wrote that "There’s a vast landscape in Abyss, but most times it’s too dark to be certain of what you see. That wavering imagery, an intentional creative choice, gives the album room to swell with personalized monsters." Drowned in Sound critic Giuseppe Zevolli wrote: "Abyss proves that there's still much work to do in the dark side of alt rock. Chelsea Wolfe is surely ahead of the curve."

Reviewing the album for Pitchfork, contributor Brandon Stosuy declared "Wolfe has incorporated metallic elements into her music since the beginning—especially on 2013's Pain Is Beauty—but she's never really gone full-on metal. And, honestly, she still hasn't, but on Abyss she comes closer than ever, externalizing those tendencies. She's thrown in moments of distortion, animal-like growling, or hiss on her other records, but it could come off like an affectation or add-on; here, it's built into, and integral to, the music, which frequently booms with distorted doom-metal guitar."

== Track listing ==
All tracks are written by Chelsea Wolfe, except where noted.

Abyss – Standard edition
No.	Title	Length
1.	"Carrion Flowers"	4:50
2.	"Iron Moon" (writers: Wolfe, Karlos Rene Ayala)	5:46
3.	"Dragged Out"	4:20
4.	"Maw"	5:54
5.	"Grey Days"	5:19
6.	"After the Fall"	5:35
7.	"Crazy Love"	3:33
8.	"Simple Death"	5:22
9.	"Survive"	5:38
10.	"Color of Blood" (writers: Jesse K. Phillips)	4:48
11.	"The Abyss"	4:12
Total length:		55:17

Abyss – Japanese edition (bonus track)
No.	Title	Length
12.	"Carrion Flowers" (Demo)	4:44
Total length:		60:01

Abyss – Deluxe edition (bonus tracks)
No.	Title	Length
12.	"Hypnos"	4:01
13.	"Flame"	3:38
14.	"Grey Days" (Demo)	5:54
15.	"Simple Death" (Demo)	5:18
16.	"Survive" (Demo)	5:34
Total length:		79:42

== Personnel ==
Credits adapted from AllMusic.

- Chelsea Wolfe – bass, guitar, piano, vocals
- Ezra Buchla – viola, vocals
- Ben Chisholm – bass, guitar, keyboards, layout, photography, piano, programming
- John Congleton – engineer, producer
- Dylan Fujioka – drums
- D.H. Phillips – lap steel guitar
- Mike Sullivan – guitar
- Henrik Uldalen – cover art, paintings

== Charts ==
Chart performance for Abyss
Chart (2015)	Peak position
Belgian Albums (Ultratop Flanders)	74
Belgian Albums (Ultratop Wallonia)	96
UK Album Sales (OCC)	86
UK Independent Albums (Official Charts)	14
US Billboard 200	130
US Americana/Folk Albums (Billboard)	6
US Heatseekers Albums (Billboard)	1
US Independent Albums (Billboard)	32
US Indie Store Album Sales (Billboard)	10
