= VENN =

American streaming television network

- Broadcast area: Worldwide
- Headquarters: Playa Vista, California United States

Programming
- Language: English
- Picture format: HDTV (1080p/720p 16:9)

Ownership
- Owner: Gaming 24/7, Inc.

History
- Launched: August 5, 2020
- Closed: August 2021

Links
- Website: www.venn.tv

VENN (short for The Video Game Entertainment & News Network) was an American streaming television network based in Playa Vista, California. Launched on August 5, 2020, the network was dedicated to gaming and pop culture content geared towards Millennial and Generation Z audiences.

== History ==
VENN was co-founded in 2019 by former EA Brand Marketer Ben Kusin and Riot Games' former Head of Esports Content Ariel Horn. The network raised $17 million in a seed funding round led by Bitkraft Esports Ventures and private investment firm Eldridge Industries.

VENN was officially announced in April 2020 as a gaming TV network that provides a "mix of gaming, news, entertainment, and music, as well as original series featuring creators and influencers." The network built a studio in Playa Vista, California with another one being constructed in New York City, located inside 3 World Trade Center. However, due to the COVID-19 pandemic, the completion and opening of the New York studio was delayed until further notice.

VENN beta launched on August 5, 2020, featured over 30+ hours of new content weekly, and was available on Twitch and YouTube. The network was broadcast on Twitch, YouTube, Facebook Gaming, Xumo, Samsung TV Plus, The Roku Channel, Vizio, Plex, Distro TV, and Stirr. All of its programming prioritized live community interaction, either through polls or the hosts reading comments and answering questions from the Twitch chat or the official Discord server.

On October 20, 2020, it was announced that VENN had raised over $26 million during its Series A round of financing. The added investments bring its company total to $43 million and will be used to further expand its business. The company also announced the hiring of former MTV employee Jeff Jacobs as their new EVP and general manager.

In 2021, Horn announced a recalibration of VENN's content creation and distribution. These include a heavy focus on its Esports coverage, a simulcasting deal with Fan Controlled Football, the launch of two new YouTube channels (VENN Download and VENN Esports, with its main channel being rebranded as VENN Plays), and the retooling of The Download and Guest House into more short-form series. Horn also revealed they are in talks with linear television outlets for syndication deals and plan on producing more content for streaming platforms. In July, VENN retained accounting firm Armanino LLP to seek a possible acquisition. The following month, the network cut half of their staff and Facecheck, a show that was acquired for its 3rd Season by Venn, then became acquired by G4 for its 4th Season. VENN's YouTube and social media accounts have since been inactive, with the network's website taken offline. VENN has since been considered defunct.

One May 5, 2022, an article from the outlet Input revealed allegations from former VENN employees that claim that mismanagement led to the company shutting down.

== See also ==
- G4 – A similar network owned by Comcast Spectacor that announced its relaunch a month before VENN's own launch.
