= Apokalypsis (album) =

Studio album by Chelsea Wolfe
- Released: August 23, 2011
- Recorded: 2010
- Genres: Gothic rock, neofolk
- Length: 37:28
- Label: Pendu Sound
- Producers: Chelsea Wolfe; Ben Chisholm

Chelsea Wolfe chronology
The Grime and the Glow (2010)	Apokalypsis (2011)	Unknown Rooms: A Collection of Acoustic Songs (2012)

Singles from Ἀποκάλυψις
- 1. "Mer" Released: June 1, 2011

Apokalypsis (stylised as Ἀποκάλυψις) is the second studio album by American singer-songwriter Chelsea Wolfe, released on Pendu Sound Recordings on August 23, 2011.

== Writing and composition ==
The tracks "Demons" and "Moses" are re-recordings of two songs which previously appeared on Wolfe's previous album The Grime and The Glow as "Bounce House Demons" and "Moses," respectively.

On the Bandcamp release of the album, an alternate version of "Primal / Carnal" exists with an accompanying backing instrumental that runs at about a minute in length.

The album features a folk rock sound that was labeled as "doom-folk" and "drone-folk" by critics.

=== Album art ===
The album cover, as stated by Wolfe in an interview with Self-titled Magazine, explained, "with the eyes blanked out in white, is meant to represent a sense of epiphany and the positivity in realizing and accepting truths, whether they are beautiful or hideous."

== Reception ==
Professional ratings
Aggregate scores
Source	Rating
Metacritic	67/100
Review scores
Source	Rating
AllMusic	3.5/5 stars
Pitchfork	7.3/10
Consequence of Sound	C−
No Ripcord	6/10
CMJ	7/10
The A.V. Club	C+

Apokalypsis was met with "generally favorable" reviews from critics. At Metacritic, which assigns a weighted average rating out of 100 to reviews from mainstream publications, this release received an average score of 67 based on 5 reviews.

CMJ's Sasha Patpatia noted, "Songs like 'Wasteland' and 'Pale On Pale' drop the energy and could easily be forgotten among the stronger tracks on the album. The instrumentation on each song, though, is rich and brooding, weaving a distinguishable sound that suitably ties Apokalypsis together," adding, "'Movie Screen' is stunning. It seems otherworldly and is the first real sample of Wolfe’s amazing and deep vocal range. This song is the spookiest track on the album, even creepier than 'Primal/Carnal' because it feels much more personal than the horror-film soundtrack." Pitchfork's David Raposa observed, "She's able to approximate the general pallor and stuttering sample-based rhythms of Dummy-era Portishead (on 'Movie Screen'), makes like a superfan of Zola Jesus' The Spoils (on 'The Wasteland'), apes early PJ Harvey (on the fittingly titled 'Moses'), and even recalls the icy allure and off-kilter harmonies of the Knife (on 'Friedrichshain'). It speaks favorably to Wolfe's abilities that she's able to approximate all these different styles successfully, but these tracks don't say much about who Wolfe actually is."

== Track listing ==
All tracks are written by Chelsea Wolfe.

No.	Title	Length
1.	"Primal/Carnal"	0:24
2.	"Mer"	3:44
3.	"Tracks (Tall Bodies)"	4:00
4.	"Demons"	3:14
5.	"Movie Screen"	5:34
6.	"The Wasteland"	4:03
7.	"Moses"	4:07
8.	"Friedrichshain"	2:43
9.	"Pale on Pale"	6:59
10.	"To the Forest, Towards the Sea"	2:41

== Personnel ==
Band

- Chelsea Wolfe – lead vocals, guitar, record producer
- Ben Chisholm – synthesizer, backing vocals, production
- Kevin Dockter – lead guitar
- Drew Walker – drums
- Addison Quarles – bass

Production personnel

- Ira Skinner – Engineering
