= Hiss Spun =

Studio album by Chelsea Wolfe
- Released: September 22, 2017
- Studios: God City Studio (Salem, Massachusetts)
- Genres: Doom metal; gothic metal; sludge metal; post-metal
- Length: 48:19
- Label: Sargent House
- Producers: Chelsea Wolfe; Ben Chisholm

Chelsea Wolfe chronology
Abyss (2015)	Hiss Spun (2017)	Birth of Violence (2019)

Hiss Spun is the fifth studio album by American singer-songwriter Chelsea Wolfe, released on September 22, 2017, by Sargent House. The album was recorded in Salem, Massachusetts, at Converge guitarist Kurt Ballou's God City Studio. Produced by Wolfe and Ben Chisholm, the album also features guitar contributions from Troy Van Leeuwen of Queens of the Stone Age and a guest appearance from Aaron Turner of Isis.

Hiss Spun received positive reviews from music critics, and peaked at No. 146 on the Billboard 200, becoming her second consecutive album to enter the chart.

== Themes ==
In an interview for Noisey, Wolfe explained that the album's topics deal with her confronting various health issues: "I deal with extreme anxiety that gets exacerbated by bouts of insomnia [...] I’m constantly trying to find ways to calm down… That has manifested into addiction at times [and] I carried a lot of that into this record, especially on '16 Psyche' and 'Spun'."

Wolfe also disclosed that the album had been about coming to terms with issues both familial and personal. In the interview, she stated that "there were some things I hadn't dealt with before, from the dark past of my family, to relationships I'd had, to my own health, some of the songs became a personal exorcism and some of them were written in dedication to the hardships that others have faced."

== Release ==
Wolfe announced Hiss Spun on June 14, 2017, coinciding with the release of "16 Psyche" as the first single from the album. NPR simultaneously released an article reviewing the song and previewing the album, whereupon writer Paula Mejia wrote, "The impetus for Hiss Spun stemmed from a reckoning with family history, personal life and other elements that have long shadowed Wolfe, and the resulting escapist music also functions as a kind of exorcism, an expunging of the soul. But what "16 Psyche" especially goes to show is that despite what's going on in our own worlds and the one at large, the discovery of new ones — whether they're made of fire or ice or even metal — is a worthy pursuit, and certainly one worth fighting for." The song is named after the asteroid.

On July 5, Wolfe released a trailer for the album and announced dates for a North American tour with Youth Code in support of the album.

"Vex" was the second track to be released from the album. Wolfe unveiled the song on July 27, revealing the contributions by Van Leeuwen and Turner. In a letter published by The Fader on August 2, Wolfe described the process she went through to create the song: "'Vex' began almost as a black metal song, with a pummeling blast beat, then Ben (Chisholm) and I stripped it back to a more industrial electronic sound. Once we were in the studio, Jess Gowrie's drums and Troy Van Leeuwen's guitar parts began to shepherd it back toward its heavy origins... I knew from the beginning that I wanted Aaron Turner's voice somewhere on this album, and could hear him in my head on 'Vex'. I had already recorded my vocals for the song but decided to send it to Aaron without them on. Happily, the first time we played it back with both vocal parts they fit together in a very compelling way."

A promotional video was released for "16 Psyche" on August 14, accompanied by the Noisey interview. Wolfe revealed two more of the album's tracks shortly before its release, with both "The Culling" and "Offering" being made available online on September 7.

== Critical reception ==
Professional ratings
Aggregate scores
Source	Rating
AnyDecentMusic?	7.7/10
Metacritic	81/100
Review scores
Source	Rating
AllMusic	4/5 stars
The A.V. Club	C+
Exclaim!	8/10
Financial Times	4/5 stars
The Irish Times	3/5 stars
Mojo	4/5 stars
Pitchfork	7.2/10
Record Collector	5/5 stars
Slant Magazine	4/5 stars
Uncut	8/10

Hiss Spun received universal acclaim from music critics. At Metacritic, which assigns a normalized rating out of 100 to reviews from mainstream critics, the album received an average score of 81, based on 19 reviews. Journalist Sam Shepherd praised the album in his review for MusicOMH, noting: "While Wolfe's incredible vocals are the main draw, her long term collaborator Ben Chisholm deserves significant recognition too. Not only does his fuzzed-to-fuck bass make these songs feel genuinely threatening, his manipulation of sound and creation of washes and collages provides unsettling backgrounds for Wolfe to weave her magic over. Without him, the oppressive atmospherics of the album wouldn't be nearly as effective." Similarly, The Skinny's Adam Turner-Heffer wrote, "Ballou's signature crushing heaviness may have become a cliché in some circles, but paired with Wolfe's beautiful voice and brilliant writing, it's a match made in heaven." AllMusic critic Heather Phares wrote, "Both fierce and fragile, Hiss Spun presents an artist in compelling control of the entire scope of her expression." Emma Madden of Drowned in Sound said, "Though Hiss Spun probably won't end up as the best of her career, it may well be Wolfe's best so far."

Pitchfork's Saby Reyes-Kulkarni stated that with Hiss Spun, Wolfe "dives headfirst into sludge metal and creates a unique space where sweetness can be heavy and contact is always uncomfortable". Luke Cartledge of The Line of Best Fit rated the album 8.5 out of 10, remarking, "Wolfe has never shied away from the heavy, the metallic, but this is her first record to fully embrace the extremities offered by doom and experimental metal". Josh Goller of Slant Magazine noted that "though it may be her second consecutive album to lean heavily on metal, Hiss Spun deftly incorporates a diverse range of sounds." Exclaim!'s Matt Yuyitung stated that "listening to Hiss Spun is a punishing affair, but it's a rewarding one too. It's the sound of an artist not afraid to dig deep emotionally, and that challenges the listener to do so as well."

In a more mixed review, Alex McLevy from The A.V. Club stated that "Hiss Spun is a full-on sludge-metal extravaganza, never content to go slow and heavy when it could be going slower and heavier. The bombast is overwhelming, and while there's an admirable zeal to her drive for making almost every second as intense as possible, it begins to get numbing."

=== Accolades ===
Publication	Accolade	Rank	Ref.
Drowned in Sound	Drowned in Sound's Favorite Albums of 2017	59	
The Independent	Top 20 Rock & Metal Albums of 2017	12	
Kerrang!	Kerrang!'s Albums of 2017	18	
Louder Than War	Top 100 Albums of 2017	43	
Revolver	20 Best Albums of 2017	4	
State	State's Albums of 2017	42	

== Track listing ==
All tracks are written by Chelsea Wolfe.

No.	Title	Length
1.	"Spun"	5:29
2.	"16 Psyche"	4:18
3.	"Vex"	3:02
4.	"Strain"	1:14
5.	"The Culling"	6:01
6.	"Particle Flux"	4:53
7.	"Twin Fawn"	6:07
8.	"Offering"	2:50
9.	"Static Hum"	4:21
10.	"Welt"	1:55
11.	"Two Spirit"	5:04
12.	"Scrape"	3:04
Total length:		48:19

Japanese edition bonus track
No.	Title	Length
13.	"Vex" (Demo)

== Personnel ==
Credits adapted from the liner notes of Hiss Spun.

- Chelsea Wolfe – vocals, production, guitar (tracks 2, 4, 9)
- Ben Chisholm – production, guitar (tracks 1–3, 6, 7, 9, 10), bass (tracks 2, 3, 5, 7, 9, 11, 12), electronics (tracks 4–6, 8, 10), keyboards (track 2), piano (track 10)
- Aaron Turner – vocals (track 3)
- Kurt Ballou – guitar (track 7), recording
- Troy Van Leeuwen – guitar (tracks 1–3, 8, 11)
- Bryan Tulao – guitar (tracks 5, 9)
- Christopher Orr – guitar (track 11)
- Jess Gowrie – drums (tracks 1–3, 5–9, 11, 12)
- Ezra Buchla – viola (track 4)
- Travis Brooks – sounds (track 11)
- Alan Douches – mastering
- John Crawford – art direction, design
- Corey Holms – typography
- Bill Crisafi – photography, hair typography
- Muted Fawn – collage
- Cathy Pellow – management

== Charts ==
Chart (2017)	Peak position
Belgian Albums (Ultratop Flanders)	95
German Albums (Offizielle Top 100)	95
New Zealand Heatseekers Albums (RMNZ)	4
Swiss Albums (Schweizer Hitparade)	92
UK Independent Albums (Official Charts)	34
UK Rock & Metal Albums (Official Charts)	19
US Billboard 200	146
US Independent Albums (Billboard)	10
US Heatseekers Albums (Billboard)	3
US Top Alternative Albums (Billboard)	18
US Top Hard Rock Albums (Billboard)	9
US Top Rock Albums (Billboard)	27
