= Paul Maher Jr. =

- Born: 1963 (age 62–63); Amarillo, Texas
- Occupations: author, teacher, book critic
- Website: www.officialpaulmaherjr.com

Paul Maher Jr. (born 1963) is an author, book critic, photographer and filmmaker best known for his published books about Jack Kerouac.

== Early life and education ==
Paul Maher Jr. was born in Amarillo, Texas, where his father was stationed in the Air Force. Shortly afterwards the family moved to Lowell, Massachusetts, where Maher remained through childhood. Upon graduating from Dracut High School, he joined the United States Navy where he served in the Persian Gulf aboard the USS Ramsey. Upon discharge, Maher returned to Lowell. He attended Middlesex Community College and the University of Massachusetts Lowell, where he obtained an undergraduate degree in American studies. He later completed a master's degree in education with a concentration in English.

== Career ==
From 2004 through the present, Maher authored and edited five books for publication. Maher is also rewriting his book on the real-life adventures of Jack Kerouac's On the Road. Ongoing projects are his transcriptions and annotations of the unpublished Extracts Related to the Indians by Henry David Thoreau, and Kalendar (working title) a film project based on Thoreau's natural history writings. He is also researching and writing a book on Terrence Malick's 2017 film, The Voyage of Time.

== Published works ==
- 2004 Kerouac: The Definitive Biography (Taylor Trade Publishing)
- 2005 Empty Phantoms: Interviews and Encounters with Jack Kerouac (Thunder's Mouth Press)
- 2007 Jack Kerouac's American Journey: The Real-Life Odyssey of On the Road (Thunder's Mouth Press)
- 2007 Kerouac: His Life and Work (Taylor Trade Publishing) (revised, formerly Kerouac: The Definitive Biography)
- 2008 Extracts Related to the Indians - Notebook One by H.D. Thoreau ed. & annotated by P. Maher Jr.
- 2008 Extracts Related to the Indians - Notebook Two by H.D. Thoreau ed. & annotated by P. Maher Jr.
- 2009 Miles on Miles: Interviews and Encounters with Miles Davis (Chicago Review Press)ed. by P. Maher Jr. and Michael K. Dorr
- 2011 Tom Waits on Tom Waits: Interviews and Encounters (Chicago Review Press)
- 2012 One Big Soul: An Oral History of Terrence Malick
- 2013 Burning Furiously Beautiful: The True Story of Jack Kerouac's On the Road (with Stephanie Nikolopoulos)

=== Forthcoming work ===
- 2014 Kalendar (a film)
- I Am the Revolutionary: Young Jack Kerouac (2017)
- Terrence Malick's Voyage of Time (2018)

== Publishers ==
- Thunder's Mouth Press
- Taylor Trade Publishing
- Southern Illinois University Press
- Chicago Review Press
- Da Capo Press
- American Renaissance Press

== Personal life ==
Maher is the father of two daughters, Rachel and Chloe.
