= Sleep Has His House =

Studio album by Current 93
- Released: 2000
- Recorded: February 2000
- Genre: Folk; drone; experimental
- Length: 62:51
- Label: Durtro

Current 93 chronology
I Have a Special Plan for This World (2000)	Sleep Has His House (2000)	Faust (2000)

Professional ratings
Review scores
Source	Rating
AllMusic	4/5 stars
The Encyclopedia of Popular Music	3/5 stars

Sleep Has His House is an album by the English apocalyptic folk group Current 93, released in 2000. The album was written and recorded as a reaction to the death of David Tibet's father. It prominently features harmonium. The lyrics were mostly written by Tibet and the music composed by Michael Cashmore. The album title was taken from the title of the Anna Kavan novel Sleep Has His House, which itself is a translation of a line from Confessio Amantis by the Middle English poet John Gower. The final track, "The God of Sleep Has Made His House", is based on a section of the Confessio Amantis.

== Critical reception ==
The Quietus wrote that "'The Magical Bird In The Magical Woods' is not only the best track on the record but also one of Tibet’s greatest odes, inaugurated with brooding harmonium which is the main constant on the album."

== Track listing ==
All lyrics are written by David Tibet; all music is composed by Michael Cashmore.

Original CD Album
No.	Title	Lyrics	Music	Length
1.	"Love's Young Dream"			3:01
2.	"Good Morning, Great Moloch"			3:18
3.	"The Magical Bird in the Magical Woods"			8:47
4.	"Red Hawthorn Tree"			4:33
5.	"Immortal Bird"			6:33
6.	"Niemandswasser"			6:07
7.	"Lullaby"			1:43
8.	"Sleep Has His House"		David Tibet	24:17
9.	"The God of Sleep Has Made His House"	John Gower		4:32

All lyrics are written by David Tibet; all music is composed by Michael Cashmore.

Original 2LP Album
No.	Title	Lyrics	Music	Length
1.	"Love's Young Dream"			3:02
2.	"Good Morning, Great Moloch"			3:18
3.	"The Magical Bird in the Magical Woods"			8:47
4.	"Red Hawthorn Tree"			4:33
5.	"Immortal Bird"			6:33
6.	"Niemandswasser"			6:30
7.	"Lullaby"			1:46
8.	"Sleep Has His House"		David Tibet	24:17
9.	"The God of Sleep Has Made His House"	John Gower		4:32

Harmonium Drones
No.	Title	Length
1.	"Sleep Has His House"	11:38
2.	"Poppy"	9:48
3.	"Go To Sleep"	2:05
4.	"Sky End"	3:06
5.	"Hypnagogic Christ"	24:37

== Participants ==
- Michael Cashmore - all instruments, music (all except track 8)
- David Tibet - vocals, harmonium, music (track 8), lyrics (all except track 9)
- Steven Stapleton - the world, mixing
- Colin Potter - engineering
- Pantaleimon - help on track 3
