= Feasting with Panthers =

Studio album by Marc Almond and Michael Cashmore
- Released: 30 May 2011
- Recorded: Roland's Studio, Dean Street Studios
- Genre: Pop, rock
- Length: 60:42
- Label: Strike Force Entertainment / Cherry Red Records
- Producer: Marc Almond and Michael Cashmore

Marc Almond chronology
Varieté (2010)	Feasting with Panthers (2011)	The Tyburn Tree (Dark London) (2014)

Michael Cashmore chronology
The Snow Abides (2007)	Feasting with Panthers (2011)

Feasting with Panthers is the sixteenth solo studio album by the British singer-songwriter Marc Almond. The album is credited to Almond and Michael Cashmore, of Current 93 and Nature and Organisation, with both given equal billing. The album was released by Strike Force Entertainment, part of Cherry Red Records, on 30 May 2011.

== Background ==
Marc Almond first worked with Michael Cashmore when Almond contributed guest vocals to the Current 93 album Black Ships Ate the Sky. They next collaborated as Marc Almond & Michael Cashmore for the EP Gabriel and the Lunatic Lover in 2008 and continued to occasionally work together until they completed Feasting with Panthers. The album is entirely composed of poetry set to music and was produced with both artists separate at all times with music and vocals being sent back and forth. The Guardian describes the album as "a sumptuous piano-driven collaboration with Michael Cashmore, featuring songs derived from the poetry of Jean Cocteau, Gérard de Nerval and Jean Genet", which Almond in the same article calls "decadent poetry translated by Jeremy Reed".

The album was released as a gatefold digipak which included a 14-page booklet.

== Critical reception ==
Professional ratings
Review scores
Source	Rating
AllMusic	2.5/5 stars
Record Collector	3/5 stars

Feasting with Panthers received mixed reviews from critics. Ian Shirley in the Record Collector magazine states that it is an album of "tales of young boys and dark pleasure" but calls it "a sumptuous banquet". Jon O'Brien in his AllMusic review states that Feasting with Panthers "is just too one-note to be considered as anything other than highbrow background music" but concedes that "Almond is in fine form, toning down his sometimes theatrical tendencies in favor of a more restrained vocal style".

== Track listing ==
1. "The Thief and the Night" (Jean Genet) – 5:20
2. "Sonnet XI" (Count Eric Stenbock) – 2:02
3. "Boy Caesar" (Jeremy Reed) – 6:40
4. "The Lunatic Lover" (Stenbock) – 6:07
5. "Crime of Love" (Paul Verlaine) – 3:30
6. "The Sleeper in the Valley" (Arthur Rimbaud) – 3:54
7. "The Song of the Unwept Tear" (Stenbock) – 3:27
8. "Patron Saint of Lipstick" (Reed) – 4:45
9. "Gabriel" (Stenbock) – 5:49
10. "El Desdichado" (Gérard de Nerval) – 2:26
11. "Hotel de France and Poetry" (Jean Cocteau) – 3:55
12. "The Man Condemned to Death" (Genet) – 5:35
13. "Feasting with Panthers" (Zebulon Xander) – 7:12

== Personnel ==
- Marc Almond – vocals
- Michael Cashmore – all instruments and backing vocals
- Jeremy Reed – poem translation & adaptation
