= Christ and the Pale Queens Mighty in Sorrow =

Christ And The Pale Queens Mighty In Sorrow

Studio album by Current 93
- Released: 1988
- Genre: Industrial; neofolk
- Length: 1:11:35
- Label: Maldoror
- Producer: Steven Stapleton

Christ And The Pale Queens Mighty In Sorrow is an album by the English group Current 93. Like Imperium it was made during a musical style shift between the earlier industrial sound of Current 93 and the current more neofolk inspired sound. It was originally released as an LP in 1988 on the Maldoror label, but was reissued as CD in 1989 and 1994.

== Track listing ==
=== Original LP ===
I

1. "Dögun": 4:03
2. "Forever Changing": 9:38
3. "Ballad of the Pale Christ": 5:49

II

1. "Christ and the Pale Queens, Mighty in Sorrow": 20:00

III

1. "Night"

IV

Blank side with image similar to cover art cut into vinyl

=== CD ===
1. "Dögun" - 4:01
2. "Forever Changing" - 9:36
3. "The Ballad of the Pale Christ" - 5:47
4. "Christ and the Pale Queens" - 19:57
5. "The Red Face of God" - 4:01
6. "The Breath and Pain of God" - 9:45
7. "Mighty in Sorrow" - 18:24

== Personnel ==
- David Tibet - vocals
- Douglas P - guitar, vocals, drums
- Rose McDowall - guitars, vocals
- Tony Wakeford - bass
- Dik - piano, engineering
- Steven Stapleton - guitar, zither, mixing
