= Dawn (Current 93 album) =

Studio album by Current 93
- Released: 1987
- Recorded: 1983–1986
- Genre: Industrial
- Length: 33:00
- Label: Maldoror; Durtro
- Producer: David Tibet

Current 93 chronology
Live at Bar Maldoror (1987)	Dawn (1987)	Imperium (1987)

1989 CD cover

Dawn is an album by the English group Current 93. It is among the earlier releases of Current 93 and has a more industrial sound, compared to the band's current apocalyptic folk sound. Originally released in 1987 as an LP on the Maldoror label, it was reissued in 1989 on CD by Durtro. This reissue mistakenly contained an alternate version of "Great Black Time". In 2002, the album was again reissued on CD, containing both the alternate and the original LP version of "Great Black Time". In 2009, the album was yet again reissued on CD, restoring only the original vinyl edition and excluding the bonus tracks from earlier editions. The limited bonus disc contained an Andrew Liles remix.

The track "Great Black Time" contains a sample of "California Dreamin'".

The original LP cover featured the Dawn logo in black on a plain white background. On the first reissue, the cover was replaced with a lavish colour illustration. For future reissues, the cover was reverted to its original form, with the logo appearing in red on a plain black background.

== Track listing ==
=== Original LP ===
1. "Great Black Time" - 14:45
2. "Maldoror Est Mort" - 18:15

=== CD ===
1. "Great Black Time" - 14:46
2. "Maldoror Est Mort" - 18:19
3. "Great Black Time (LP version)" - 14:49 (2002 CD only)
4. "A Day in Dogland" - 6:16
5. "Extra Ecclesiam Nulla Salus" - 6:03

== Personnel ==
- David Tibet
- Steven Stapleton
- John Balance
- John Murphy
- Rose McDowall
- Douglas P.
