= Of Ruine or Some Blazing Starre =

Studio album by Current 93
- Released: 30 November 1993
- Recorded: April 1991 and September 1993
- Genre: Neofolk, experimental, industrial
- Length: 49:43
- Label: Durtro
- Producer: Steven Stapleton, David Tibet, Michael Cashmore

Current 93 chronology
Emblems: The Menstrual Years (1993)	Of Ruine or Some Blazing Starre (1993)	Lucifer Over London (1994)

Of Ruine or Some Blazing Starre - The Broken Heart of Man is an album by English band Current 93.

== Track listing ==
1. "A Voice from Catland" – 0:22
2. "Steven and I in the Field of Stars" – 2:56
3. "The Teeth of the Winds of the Sea" – 7:15
4. "Moonlight, You Will Say" – 5:19
5. "Into the Bloody Hole I Go" – 1:01
6. "The Darkly Splendid World" – 0:51
7. "The Cloud of Unknowing" – 7:28
8. "Let Us Go to the Rose" – 5:17
9. "All the World Makes Great Blood" – 3:55
10. "The Great, Bloody and Bruised Veil of the World" – 4:17
11. "Into the Menstrual Night I Go" – 1:14
12. "Dormition and Dominion" – 6:19
13. "So: This Empire Is Nothing" – 1:08
14. "This Shining Shining World" – 2:51

== Personnel ==
- Michael Cashmore - guitars, bass, drums, glockenspiel, sounds, additional mixing
- Phoebe Cheshire - spoken vocals, sung vocals
- Steven Stapleton - guitars, drones, bric-a-brac arrangements, mixing
- David Tibet - vocals, sounds, additional mixing
- David Kenny - engineering
- Starspace - bass (track 4)
