= Thunder Perfect Mind (Current 93 album) =

Studio album by Current 93
- Released: 28 July 1992
- Recorded: September 1990 – February 1992
- Studio: Topic Studios, North London
- Genre: Apocalyptic folk Experimental
- Length: 78:45
- Label: Durtro
- Producer: David Tibet

Current 93 chronology
As the World Disappears (1991)	Thunder Perfect Mind (1992)	Current 93/Death In June/Sol Invictus (1992)

Professional ratings
Review scores
Source	Rating
Pitchfork Media	(9.3/10)

Thunder Perfect Mind is an album by the English experimental group Current 93, released on 28 July 1992. It contains two tracks based on the Gnostic poem The Thunder, Perfect Mind, which also gave the album its name. Thunder Perfect Mind has a companion album by the same name recorded by Nurse With Wound, released at the same time, though the two albums have little in common with each other musically.

The album is one of David Tibet's more personal records, with several songs dedicated to friends, colleagues and people he had met. "All The Stars Are Dead Now" consists of a startling prophecy Tibet says William Blake gave in a dream. The 15 minute conclusion “Hitler As Kalki (SDM)" is dedicated to "my father, who fought Hitler”; Tibet reports his father was among the soldiers who liberated the Bergen-Belsen concentration camp. The album liner notes indicate that some believed Hitler was Kalki, the tenth and final incarnation of Vishnu, who would destroy the cosmos upon a white horse at the end of each world cycle.

Original pressings contained a portrait of David Tibet's face, while later pressings contained a drawing of a startled cat drawn by Louis Wain. On its 2003 re-release, the cover sported Tibet's face again, though a second re-issue a year later on Durtro Jnana Records (due to World Serpent's sudden disappearance) featured a beige-toned pattern across the portrait. These later pressings included a bonus disc titled The Thunder, Perfect Mind which contained outtakes and alternate mixes of songs, as well as five live tracks recorded in Paris on 15 December 1990. All of the studio tracks save "Red House" and an acoustic version of "Anyway, People Die" had previously appeared on Emblems: The Menstrual Years.

== Track listing ==
All songs written by Current 93, except "When the May Rain Comes" (cover of the song "May Rain" by German experimental band Sand).

1. "A Beginning" – 0:44
2. "The Descent of Long Satan and Babylon" – 3:00
3. "A Sadness Song" – 4:14
4. "A Song for Douglas After He's Dead" – 4:58
5. "In the Heart of the Wood and What I Found There" – 2:50
6. "Mary Waits in Silence" – 2:56
7. "A Silence Song" – 5:27
8. "A Lament for My Suzanne" – 4:20
9. "Riverdeadbank" – 3:46
10. "All the Stars Are Dead Now" – 9:06
11. "Rosy Star Tears from Heaven" – 3:05
12. "When the May Rain Comes" – 3:24
13. "Thunder Perfect Mind I" – 5:05
14. "Thunder Perfect Mind II" – 2:21
15. "Hitler As Kalki (SDM)" – 16:28
16. "A Sad Sadness Song" – 4:40
17. "An Ending" – 2:21 (originally a hidden track)

=== The Thunder, Perfect Mind (2003 bonus disc) ===
1. "Suzanne: She and I in Darkness We Lay and Lie" – 4:26
2. "Red House" – 0:28
3. "Our Lady of Horsies" – 6:34
4. "Anyway, People Die" – 1:46
5. "Silence As Christine" – 2:24
6. "Maldoror Is Ded Ded Ded Ded" – 12:10
7. "They Return to Their Earth" – 6:18
8. "In Sadness Sang" – 4:19
9. "'Khor Ba'i Nyes Dmigs (Live)"
10. "Lament for Her (Live)" – 3:59
11. "A Song for Douglas After He's Dead (Live)" – 6:14
12. "They Return to Their Earth (for My Christ Thorn) (Live)" – 6:52
13. "A Song for Douglas After He's Dead (Rebirth) (Live)" – 5:43

== Personnel ==
- David Michael Tibet – vocals
- Steven Stapleton – guitars, corrugations, vocals, smokes
- James Mannox – percussion
- Douglas P. – guitars, hand percussions
- Joolie Wood – violin, tin whistle, clarinet, recorder
- Michael Cashmore – guitars
- John Balance – vocals (track 11), backing vocals (track 10)
- Rose McDowall – vocals (tracks 3, 4, 8, 11, 12, 15, and 16)
- James Malindayne-Lafayette – harp (tracks 4, 8, and 15)
- Nick Saloman – electric dulcimer, acoustic and electric guitar (track 15)
- Sarah Bradshaw – cello (track 7)
- Karl Blake – bass (track 15)
- Renate Birulf – vocals (track 9)
- David Kenny – feedback guitar (track 15), harmonic guitar (tracks 4 and 8), bass (track 12)
- Edward Ka-Spel – bells
- Shirley Collins – voice (track 1)
