= Nature Unveiled =

Studio album by Current 93
- Released: 1984
- Genre: Industrial; dark ambient
- Label: L.A.Y.L.A.H. Antirecords; LAY 04

Current 93 chronology
LAShTAL (1984)	Nature Unveiled (1984)	No Hiding from the Blackbird (1984)

Nature Unveiled is an early full-length studio album released by the English group Current 93.

== Pressing ==
- 1984 12" 1000 black vinyl in regular sleeve (L.A.Y.L.A.H. Antirecords LAY4)
- 1984 12" 1000 black vinyl in regular sleeve (2nd pressing) (L.A.Y.L.A.H. Antirecords LAY4)
- 1986 cassette in regular cassette box (Mi-Mort MM005C)
- 1989 12" 2000 black vinyl in regular sleeve (Maldoror MAL123)
- 1992 CD in jewel case (Durtro DURTRO009CD)
- 2010 CD in jewel case with bonus Andrew Liles remix disc (Durtro Jnana 94)

== Track listing ==
=== Original LP ===
A

1. "Ach Golgotha (Maldoror Is Dead)" 18:59

B

1. "The Mystical Body of Christ in Chorazaim (The Great in the Small)" 19:30

=== Cassette ===
A

1. "Ach Golgotha (Maldoror Is Dead)"
2. "Christ's First Howling"
3. "Fields of Rape"

B

1. "The Mystical Body of Christ in Chorazaim (The Great in the Small)"
2. "I'm the One"

=== CD ===
1. "Ach Golgotha (Maldoror Is Dead)" - 18:59
2. "The Mystical Body of Christ in Chorazaim (The Great in the Small)" - 19:50
3. "No Hiding from the Blackbird" - 4:04
4. "The Burial of the Sardine" (Nurse with Wound) - 6:16
5. "LAShTAL" - 3:52
6. "Salt" - 3:49
7. "Maldoror Rising (Live in Amsterdam 1984)" - 8:55
8. "Maldoror Falling (Live in Brighton 1984)" - 12:13

== Personnel ==
- David Tibet
- Steven Stapleton
- Annie Anxiety
- Youth
- John Fothergill
- Roger Smith
- John Murphy
- Nick Rogers
- John Balance
- Fritz Haäman
- Andy
- Tim Spy
