= Dogs Blood Rising =

Studio album by Current 93
- Released: 1984
- Genre: Industrial
- Length: 40:06
- Label: L.A.Y.L.A.H. Antirecords; LAY 08

Current 93 chronology
No Hiding from the Blackbird (1984)	Dogs Blood Rising (1984)	Live at Bar Maldoror (1985)

Professional ratings
Review scores
Source	Rating
AllMusic	4/5 stars

Dogs Blood Rising is an early studio recording, LP record / album released by the English independent music group Current 93.

== Pressings ==
- 1984 12" black vinyl in regular sleeve (L.A.Y.L.A.H. Antirecords LAY8)
- 1985 cassette in regular cassette box (Mi-Mort MM6)
- 1988 12" black vinyl in regular sleeve (2nd pressing) (L.A.Y.L.A.H. Antirecords LAY8)
- 1988 CD in jewel case (L.A.Y.L.A.H. Antirecords LAYCD8)
- 1995 CD in jewel case (Durtro DURTRO027CD)

== Track listing ==
=== Original LP ===
A

1. "Christus Christus (the Shells Have Cracked)": 3:03
2. "Falling Back in Fields of Rape": 14:40

B

1. "From Broken Cross, Locusts": 6:04
2. "Raio No Terrasu (Jesus Wept)": 13:56
3. "St. Peters Keys All Bloody": 2:21

=== Cassette ===
A

1. "Christus Christus (the Shells Have Cracked)": 3:03
2. "Falling Back in Fields of Rape": 14:40
3. "Christ's First Howling": 3:32
4. "Fields of Rape": 3:11

B

1. "From Broken Cross, Locusts": 6:04
2. "Raio No Terrasu (Jesus Wept)": 13:56
3. "St. Peters Keys All Bloody": 2:21
4. "I'm the One": 4:06

=== CD (L.A.Y.L.A.H. Antirecords) ===
1. "Christus Christus the Shells Have Cracked" - 3:08
2. "Falling Back in Fields of Rape" - 14:49
3. "From Broken Cross, Locusts" - 6:12
4. "Raio No Terrasu (Jesus Wept)" - 14:02
5. "St. Peters Keys All Bloody" - 2:23

=== CD (Durtro) ===
1. "Christus Christus the Shells Have Cracked" - 3:08
2. "Falling Back in Fields of Rape" - 14:49
3. "From Broken Cross, Locusts" - 6:12
4. "Raio No Terrasu (Jesus Wept)" - 14:02
5. "St. Peters Keys All Bloody" - 2:23
6. "Dogs Blood Rising" - 4:58

== Personnel ==
- David Tibet
- Steven Stapleton
- John Murphy
- Nick Rogers
- Diana Rogerson
- Steve Ignorant
- Iggi
- Tathata Wallis
- Christ 777
