= Soft Black Stars =

Studio album by Current 93
- Released: 1998
- Length: 54:00
- Label: Durtro
- Producer: Michael Cashmore, Andria Degens, Christoph Heemann, Steven Stapleton, David Tibet

Current 93 chronology
In a Foreign Town, in a Foreign Land (1997)	Soft Black Stars (1998)	Calling for Vanished Faces (1999)

Soft Black Stars is an album by Current 93. The title refers to an image found in "Teatro Grottesco", a story by Thomas Ligotti. Virtually all of the music on this album was written and adapted by Michael Cashmore, David Tibet and Maja Elliott with the exception of "Judas as Black Moth", "A Gothic Love Song" and "Whilst The Night Rejoices Profound And Still"; the music for these songs was written by Michael Cashmore. Almost all of the songs feature only David Tibet's lyrics accompanied by minimalistic piano music: with the exception of "Judas as Black Moth" which is solo piano and "Chewing on Shadows" consist of drones, piano, guitar and David Tibet's singing. The artwork was made by David Tibet. "Chewing on Shadows" was released in a different form on vinyl and it was included in the album's CD re-issue in 2005. In 2003, a live album was released called Some Soft Black Stars Seen Over London which contained live versions for seven of the album's songs. In 2017 a sheet-music version was released, including all the piano and vocal parts from the original recording.

== Track listing ==
1. "Judas as Black Moth" – 2:45
2. "Larkspur and Lazarus" – 6:05
3. "Gothic Love Song (For N.)" – 4:06
4. "Mockingbird" – 4:04
5. "Soft Black Stars" – 3:08
6. "It Is Time, Only Time" – 5:06
7. "Antichrist and Barcodes" – 2:26
8. "The Signs in the Stars" – 3:43
9. "Whilst the Night Rejoices Profound and Still" – 4:24
10. "Moonlight, Or Other Dreams, Or Other Fields" – 2:08
11. "Judas as Black Moth II" – 6:17
12. "Chewing on Shadows" – 9:48
13. "Chewing on Shadows (Vinyl Version)" – 12:06 (reissue bonus track)
14. "Chewing on Shadows (Unreleased Acoustic Version)" – 3:08 (reissue bonus track)

A five-minute pause was placed between the original and vinyl versions of "Chewing on Shadows" on the reissued album.

== Participants ==
All listings are given as per the accompanying booklet.

- David Tibet - vocals
- Michael Cashmore - guitar, second piano
- Maja Elliott - piano
- Petr Vastl - violin, viola, mandolin, flute
- Andria Degens - vocals, whistling
- Steven Stapleton - whirl
- Christoph Heemann - swirl

Later editions featured a slightly different list of participants. Most notably being the fact that Christoph Heemann was no longer credited for swirl. Violin was now also referred to as ghost violin.

== Sheet music ==
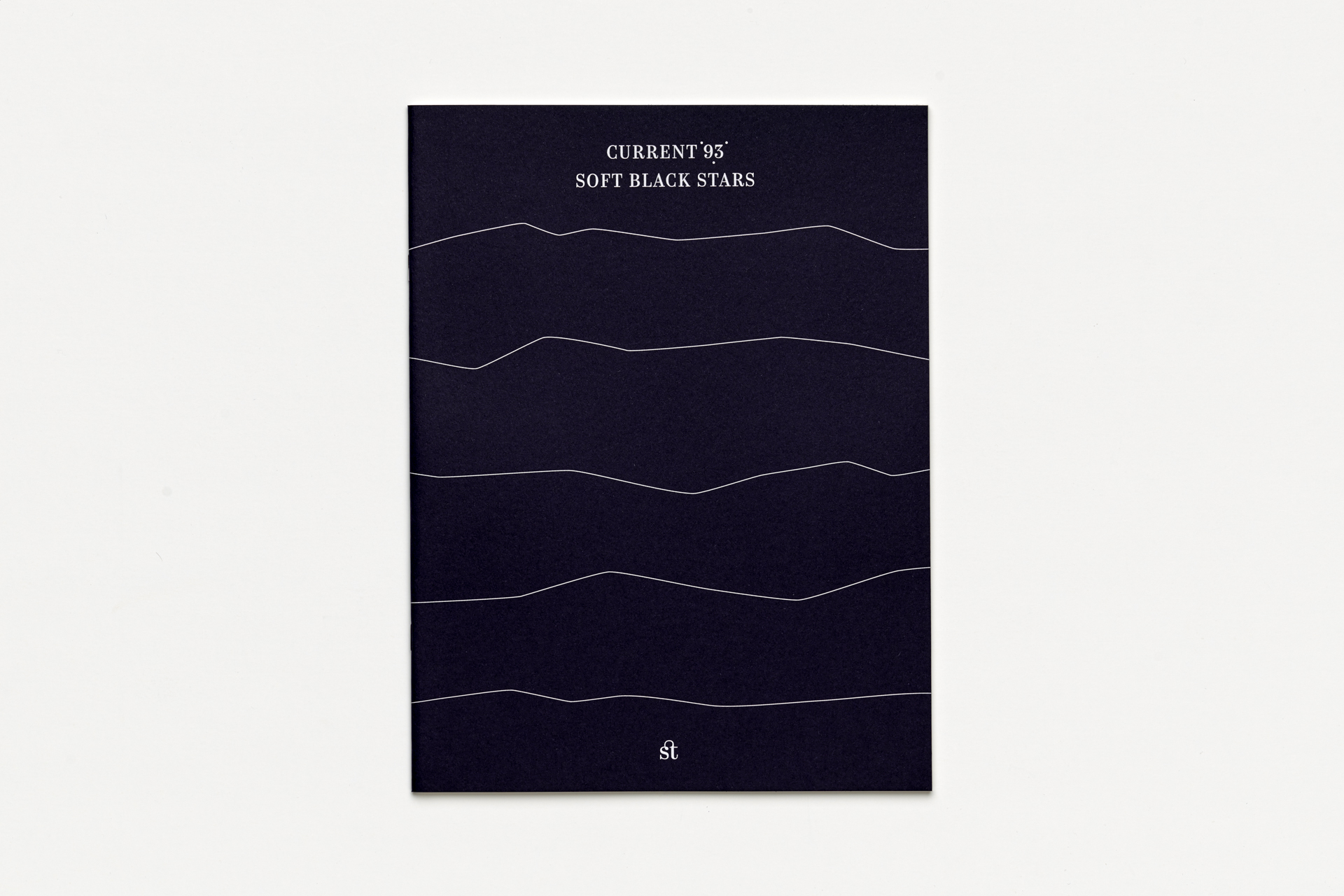
Soft Black Stars piano book

Printed music for piano and voice was released in 2017 by Terentyev Music Publishing Company. The digital version is the complete music transcription of the album, including all the piano and vocal parts. The printed version contains piano notation and the lyrics (but not the vocal lines) and provides a complete overview of which melodies and harmonies each song from Soft Black Stars should be improvised around, “to make your own stars” as David Tibet writes. The press-release says “It was, indeed, in this way that the Soft Black Stars were created during the recording sessions and in concerts.”

The copies were hand-numbered on the last page under an illustration which David Tibet made for the piano book.

== Covers ==
"Soft Black Stars" has been covered by Antony and the Johnsons.
