= Mockingbird (disambiguation) =

A mockingbird is a bird known for its mimicking habits.

Mockingbird may also refer to:

== Arts, entertainment, and media ==
=== Fictional characters ===
- Mockingbird, leader of the Secret Six in the DC Comics Universe
- Mockingbird (Marvel Comics), in the Marvel Comics Universe

=== Film and television ===
- Mockingbird (film), a 2014 found footage film by Bryan Bertin
- ″Mockingbird″ (Game of Thrones), a 2014 episode of the TV series Game of Thrones

=== Literature ===
- Mockingbird (Erskine novel), a 2010 young-adult novel by Kathryn Erskine
- Mockingbird (Tevis novel), a 1980 novel by Walter Tevis
- Mockingbird, a 1988 novel by Sean Stewart
- Mockingbird, a 2012 novel by Chuck Wendig

=== Music ===
- The Mockingbirds, 1960s band, precursor to 10cc
- Mockingbird (Derek Webb album), 2005
- Mockingbird (Allison Moorer album), 2008

==== Songs ====
- "Mockingbird" (Eminem song), 2005
- "Mockingbird" (Inez & Charlie Foxx song), 1963, remade by Carly Simon and James Taylor in 1974
- "Mockingbird" (Rob Thomas song), 2010
- "The Mocking Bird", a 1952 song by The Four Lads
- "Mockingbird", also known as "Hush, Little Baby", a lullaby
- "Mockingbird", a song by Current 93 from the 1998 album Soft Black Stars
- "Mockingbird", a song by Stan Walker from the 2022 album All In
- "Mockingbird", a song by The Libertines from the 2002 album Up the Bracket
- "Mockingbird", a song by Quaker City Night Hawks from the 2016 album El Astronauta
- "Mockingbirds", a song by Grant Lee Buffalo from the 1994 album Mighty Joe Moon
- "Mocking Bird", a song by Barclay James Harvest from the 1971 album Once Again
- "Mockin' Bird", a song by Tom Waits from the 1991/1993 album set The Early Years

== Other uses ==
- USS Mockingbird
- Mockingbird (DART station), a DART Light Rail station in Dallas, Texas
- Operation Mockingbird, the unconfirmed Central Intelligence Agency program to influence the press
- Project Mockingbird, the confirmed CIA wire tapping operation mentioned in the Family Jewels report

== See also ==
- Mockingbird Don't Sing, a 2001 American film
- To Kill a Mockingbird (disambiguation)
- Mockingjay (disambiguation)
- Mockingboard, the Apple II speech synthesis card
