= I Am the Last of All the Field That Fell: A Channel =

Studio album by Current 93
- Released: 4 March 2014
- Genre: Experimental rock, neofolk
- Length: 67:38
- Label: The Spheres

Current 93 chronology
HoneySuckle Æons (2011)	I Am the Last of All the Field That Fell: A Channel (2014)	The Light Is Leaving Us All (2018)

I Am the Last of All the Field That Fell: A Channel is an album by British experimental music group, Current 93. It was released on 4 March 2014 through The Spheres record label. The album, which was premiered live on 12 February 2014 at Union Chapel in Islington, features contributions from various artists, including James Blackshaw, Andrew Liles, Ossian Brown, Antony Hegarty, Nick Cave, John Zorn and These New Puritans member Jack Barnett.

== Description ==
The first track of this album quotes the first of Nikolai Obukhov's Six prières.

== Critical reception ==
Professional ratings
Aggregate scores
Source	Rating
Metacritic	72/100
Review scores
Source	Rating
AllMusic	4.5/5 stars
Pitchfork	5.1/10

Upon its release, I Am the Last of All the Field That Fell: A Channel generally received rave reviews. At Metacritic, which assigns a normalized rating out of 100 to reviews from critics, the album received an average score of 72, which indicates "generally favorable reviews", based on 4 reviews. Thom Jurek of AllMusic praised the album, stating: "As displayed on I Am the Last of All the Field That Fell: A Channel, it's also simultaneously holistic, maddening, erotic, bleak, bright, and most of all, visionary." Uncut wrote: "I Am The Last has a wind in its sails, though, thanks to Tibet's preacher vigour, and an extraordinary guestlist." Nevertheless, Grayson Currin of Pitchfork was mixed in his assessment of the album: "There are flutes and poetry readings, floods of noise and wisps of bass clarinet. Still, such an astounding lineup only serves to reinforce the disappointment of the flat and oftentimes gangly Field."

== Track listing ==
All songs written by Current 93.

1. "The Invisible Church" – 6:32
2. "Those Flowers Grew – 8:42
3. "Kings and Things – 6:22
4. "With the Dromedaries – 5:37
5. "The Heart Full of Eyes – 5:46
6. "Mourned Winter Then – 5:55
7. "And onto PickNickMagick – 7:52
8. "Why Did the Fox Bark? – 6:22
9. "I Remember the Berlin Boys – 3:49
10. "Spring Sand Dreamt Larks – 4:32
11. "I Could Not Shift the Shadow – 6:12

== Personnel ==
- Jack Barnett – organ, sound design, voices
- James Blackshaw – bass
- Ossian Brown – hurdy-gurdy, SiderealSingSong
- Nick Cave – voice, voices
- Antony Hegarty – voice, voices
- Reinier Van Houdt – piano
- Norbert Kox – voice
- Andrew Liles – electric channel, mixing
- Tony McPhee – acoustic guitar, electric guitar
- Jon Seagroatt – bass clarinet, flute
- Carl Stokes – drums, percussion
- David Tibet – voice, lyrics, mixing
- Bobbie Watson – voices
- John Zorn – saxophone
- The Bricoleur – mastering
- Seadna McPhail – engineering
- Pablo Clements – Nick Cave engineering
- James Griffith – Nick Cave engineering
- Alex Nizich – Antony engineering
