= Nightmare Culture =

EP (split) by Current 93 / Sickness of Snakes
- Released: 1985
- Genre: Dark ambient, drone
- Length: 22:19
- Label: L.A.Y.L.A.H. Antirecords

Professional ratings
Review scores
Source	Rating
Encyclopedia of Popular Music	3/5 stars

Nightmare Culture is a 12" split vinyl EP by Current 93 and Sickness of Snakes, which was John Balance and Peter Christopherson from Coil and Boyd Rice.

== Background ==
The first pressing was limited to 5000 copies with a seal on the cover. The second pressing came out in 1988. It came without an insert and with different center labels.

For this release Current 93 were: David Tibet, Ruby Wallis, Steven Stapleton, John Balance, Steve Ignorant and John Murphy.

The Current 93 song was later pressed on the CD reissue of "In Menstrual Night". The Sickness of Snakes songs were later released on the Coil compilation Unnatural History. "His Body Was a Playground for the Nazi Elite" (issued later on CD) then appeared on the NON album Easy Listening for Iron Youth as "Predator/Prey". "Various Hands" later appeared on the Boyd Rice album The Way I Feel' under the title "Many Hands".

The vinyl is etched as follows: Side A: Time for tea and feed the thing. Side B: I slept with Faith and woke up with a corpse in my arms

The album was pressed in the Netherlands with catalogue number LAY 14.

In 2011, Boyd Rice prepared a limited re-issue of the three Sickness of Snakes tracks on CD and a single-side twelve-inch vinyl, which was finally released in January 2013. On the front cover and liner notes, John Balance is referred to by his legal name, Geff Rushton.

== Track listing ==
Side A:

1. Current 93: "Killy Kill Killy (a Fire Sermon)" – 12:25

Side B:

1. Sickness of Snakes: "Various Hands" – 3:26
2. Sickness of Snakes: "The Swelling of Leeches" – 3:04
3. Sickness of Snakes: "The Pope Held Upside Down" – 3:24
