= Thunder Perfect Mind (Nurse with Wound album) =

Studio album by Nurse with Wound
- Released: 1992
- Recorded: Winter 1991
- Genres: Experimental, industrial, dark ambient
- Length: 56:22
- Label: United Dairies
- Producer: Steven Stapleton

Nurse with Wound chronology
Creakiness / Firepool (1991)	Thunder Perfect Mind (1992)	Crumb Duck (1993)

Thunder Perfect Mind is an album by the English group Nurse with Wound. It is a "sister" album to Current 93's album Thunder Perfect Mind, released around the same time; some basic sounds and lyrics are shared but the overall sound of each record is very different. In David Keenan's England's Hidden Reverse, Nurse with Wound mastermind Steven Stapleton explains that he had a dream in which he was handing David Tibet of Current 93 a copy of a new NWW album and that the record was called Thunder Perfect Mind, the title already chosen by Tibet for his imminent new release. Upon hearing of this dream, Tibet immediately agreed to share the title.

The album revolves around two lengthy tracks; "Cold" is a driving industrial piece full of relentlessly chaotic machinery noises, while "Colder Still" is a sweeping dark ambient piece, ending with an extended version of "Thunder Perfect Mind II" from Current 93's Thunder Perfect Mind. After a brief silence, the release concludes with a short answerphone message left by John Balance. Excerpts and reworkings of "Cold" have appeared in various forms on several other Nurse with Wound releases, most notably the single "Steel Dream March of the Metal Men", the a-side of which was entirely derived from the track. Although issued by Stapleton on his own imprint via World Serpent, the label is listed as "Untied Diaries" rather than the usual "United Dairies". This was the first NWW album to feature Colin Potter, who has collaborated with Stapleton on almost all subsequent NWW releases.

The album was finally released on vinyl in 2002 on the Streamline label, distributed through Drag City, with "Colder Still" being divided over two sides of vinyl. A remix of "Cold" was added to both the re-issued vinyl and a remastered CD on United Dairies.

An edit of "Cold" was featured on the compilation Livin' Fear of James Last. Instead of featuring the whole 23-minute version, it was cut to 12 minutes and 25 seconds.

== Track listing ==
=== CD pressing ===
1. "Cold" – 23:37
2. "Colder Still" – 32:45

==== Bonus track (2001 reissue) ====
1. "Cold (Miss Tickler Mix)" – 6:05

2016 Bonus Disc

1. Crank
2. Steel Dream March of the Metal Men
3. The Dadda's Intoxication
4. Head Cold
5. Cold (Miss Ticker Mix)
6. Spooky Loop
7. Alien
8. Colder Than
9. Colder Then
10. Bad Trip in Berlin

=== Vinyl pressing ===
==== Side one ====
1. "Cold" – 23:37

==== Side two ====
1. "Cold (Miss Ticker Mix)" – 6:05

==== Side three ====
1. "Colder Still (beginning)" – 14:43

==== Side four ====
1. "Colder Still (ending)" – 19:20

== Personnel ==
- Steven Stapleton - Production, Mixing, Editing
- David Michael Tibet - Vocals
- Colin Potter - Engineering, Sound Manipulation, Electronics
- John Balance - Stick Guitar, Mandolin, Vocals
- Rose McDowall - Vocals
- Joolie Wood - Violin, Flute
- Clive Graham - Bowed Wire, Expanding Springs
- Chris Wallis - Acoustic Guitar
- Anita Plank - Vocals
- Konori Suzuki - Vocals
- Alan Trench
- Andrew Liles - 2016 Remastering, Electronics on "Bad Trip in Berlin"
