= The Thunder, Perfect Mind =

Text in the Nag Hammadi library

Two papyrus pages containing the text of The Thunder, Perfect Mind in Coptic

The Thunder, Perfect Mind (Coptic: ⲧⲉⲃⲣⲟⲛⲧⲏ: ⲛⲟⲩⲥ ⲛ̄ⲧⲉⲗⲉⲓⲟⲥ tebrontē: nous n̄teleios) is a Coptic language text originally discovered in the Nag Hammadi library in 1945. It follows a poetic structure, and has received scholarly attention for its gnomic style and unclear subject. It speaks about the divine in paradoxical terms, as both honored and cursed, as life and death, and as both the cause of peace and war. The poem also emphasizes the idea that the divine exists both inside and outside of oneself, and that one's judgment and salvation are dependent on their relationship to the divine. It offers a unique perspective on the nature of the divine and the individual's relationship to it, and it highlights the idea of duality and the interconnectedness of opposing forces.

It has been theorized that the text was originally composed in Greek due to its meter and phrasing, and estimates of the document's age range from the first or second centuries of the common era, to no later than about 350 CE. The Thunder, Perfect Mind is sometimes classified as an example of Gnostic literature, but some authors, such as George MacRae and Hal Taussig, argue against this categorization.

== Summary ==
The opening text announces the seemingly feminine speaker's power and presence. The speaker, who was sent forth from a power, has come to those who reflect upon them and has been found among those seeking after them. The speaker invites those waiting for them to take them in, but warns not to ignore or banish them. The speaker presents themselves as a complex figure, embodying seemingly contradictory qualities such as the first and the last, the honored and the scorned, and the bride and the bridegroom.

The speaker warns to not be arrogant or dismissive of their poverty and shame but also to not be afraid of their power. The speaker questions why they are hated for their obedience and feared for their power and asserts that they exist in all fears and have strength in trembling. They describe themselves as compassionate and cruel, senseless and wise. The speaker urges to be cautious and not to dismiss their fear or curse their pride.

The text continues describing opposite qualities, such as that the speaker is both loved and hated by all people. They are seen as wisdom by the Greeks and knowledge by the barbarians, life and death, law and lawlessness. The speaker is also described as Godless and unlearned but with great power, and those who know the speaker are encouraged to come forward to them and not despise smallness or turn away greatness from small things. It calls to come forward to childhood.

The speaker continues to mention paradoxical traits, such as being both honored and despised, both close and far away, both sinless and the root of sin. They are both the knowledge of their inquiry and the finding of those who seek them, the command of those who ask of them, and the power of powers. The speaker claims to be the one who is called Truth, yet they are also associated with iniquity. They describe themselves as a mute who speaks, a bread maker, and the knowledge of their own name. The speaker encourages listeners to hear them with gentleness and learn from them through roughness. They describe themselves as a crier who also listens, and who walks in the seal of their mind. The speaker is described as the defense and says that they are called Truth.

The conclusion sees the speaker describe themselves as the hearing attainable to all, the sound of a name, and the one who alone exists and has no one to judge them. They encourage the hearers to look at the speaker's words and writings, and to heed the message and find the speaker in their resting place, where they will live without dying again.

== Structure and style ==
For it is I who am acquaintance: and lack of acquaintance.
It is I who am reticence: and frankness.
I am shameless: I am ashamed.
I am strong: and I am afraid.
It is I who am war: and peace.

— "The Thunder – Perfect Intellect", lines 26–31

The text is constructed as an extended, riddling monologue, in which an immanent divine saviour speaks a series of paradoxical statements alternating between first-person assertions of identity and direct address to the audience. These paradoxical utterances echo Greek identity riddles, a common early poetic form in the Mediterranean. Moreover, the style is marked by its non-epistolic, non-narrative representation of unmediated divine speech.

The work can also be described as a poem in parallel strophes. The author may have drawn on a tradition of Egyptian and Jewish poetry wherein a female divinity (such as Isis, or the Gnostic concept of the Sophia) expounds her virtues unto an attentive audience, and compels them to strive towards attaining these virtues. One possible reading of the text, as suggested by religious scholar Patricia Cox Miller, is that it represents the "self-revelation of a powerful goddess".

Parallels to the Isis aretalogies are less compelling than they may initially seem: in her aretalogies, Isis proclaims her accomplishments and her contributions to social and cosmic order, whereas the voice in 'Thunder' is replete with paradox and counterpoises pro-social and subversive roles and themes.

== Parallels in other scriptures ==
The Thunder, Perfect Mind has been noted to share some similarities with sacred texts of the religion of Mandaeism. In Book 6 (a.k.a. the "Book of Dinanukt") of the Mandaean Right Ginza, Ruha addresses a speech to Dinanukht, which is similar to Thunder (see the poem in the Dinanukht article). According to Tilde Bak Halvgaard (biblical scholar):

Another literary parallel to Thund. is found in the so-called "Dinanukht's Book" of the Mandean Ginza, which offers not only a parallel to the "I am"-proclamations, but also to the antithesis and paradoxes which the other literary parallels have not been able to match.

In a 1949 book, egyptologist Torgny Säve-Söderbergh noted similarities between Thunder and the fourteenth psalm in the Coptic Manichean Psalms of Thomas, in which Hylē provides an answer of co-existing opposites (e.g., "death and life").

== In media ==
- The 1992 album Thunder Perfect Mind by British folk band Current 93 uses the name of the text as the name of their LP.
- British experimental supergroup, Nurse With Wound, used the text's name to name their 1992 album, Thunder Perfect Mind.
- Sue Monk Kidd's Book; "The Book Of Longings", has depicted fictional character Ana, wife of Jesus, as the writer of this text.
- In 2005, director Ridley Scott and his daughter Jordan Scott produced a short film to promote a new fragrance from Prada. In the film, a woman reads Thunder, Perfect Mind as she goes through a day with her public and private selves in constant dynamic flux. The film premiered at the Berlin Film Festival on 13 February, 2005.
