= I Have a Special Plan for This World =

2000 single by Current 93

Single by Current 93
- Released: 2000
- Recorded: 2000
- Genre: Dark ambient; spoken word
- Length: 22:01
- Label: Durtro
- Lyricist: Thomas Ligotti
- Producers: Current 93; Steven Stapleton

Professional ratings
Review scores
Source	Rating
Sputnikmusic	3/5 stars

"I Have a Special Plan for This World" is a release by the English band Current 93. The lyrics are a prose poem of the same name by the author Thomas Ligotti and spoken by David Tibet. Additional sound treatments are credited to Current 93, incorporating a circuit bent Speak & Spell and a found tape of unknown origin credited only to "Bungalow Bill". It was released on limited edition vinyl and CD in 2000 on David Tibet's Durtro label. There was an additional special release in February 2007, when three test pressings were made in black vinyl. These featured signed and personalized sleeves with gold ink drawing and hand written labels done in black ink.

== Track listing ==
=== 12" version ===
Side A

1. "I Have a Special Plan for This World" – 22:00

Side B

1. "Excerpts from Bungalow Tapes" – 18:40

=== CD version ===
1. "I Have a Special Plan for This World" – 22:01
