= Bead game =

Bead game may refer to:

- Bead Game, an animated short by Ishu Patel
- The Glass Bead Game, the last work of Hermann Hesse
- The Glass Bead Game (album), the seventh studio album from James Blackshaw
