= The Light Is Leaving Us All =

Studio album by Current 93
- Released: 13 October 2018
- Length: 46:05
- Label: The Spheres; House of Mythology
- Producer: David Tibet; Andrew Liles

Current 93 chronology
I Am the Last of All the Field That Fell: A Channel (2014)	The Light Is Leaving Us All (2018)	If a City is set upon a Hill (2022)

Singles from The Light Is Leaving Us All
- 1. "Bright Dead Star" Released: 23 August 2018

The Light Is Leaving Us All is an album by British experimental music group Current 93. It was released on 13 October 2018 through The Spheres record label and House of Mythology. The album was performed in its entirety on 13 October 2018 in a rare performance at O_{2} Shepherd's Bush Empire in London, backed by a series of slow-moving films by Davide Pepe in the style of the album's artwork.

== Critical reception ==
Professional ratings
Review scores
Source	Rating
Pitchfork	7.2/10

The Light Is Leaving Us All has received generally positive reviews from critics. Writing for Brainwashed, Anthony D'Amico praised the album, stating it "effortlessly transcends time and space and dissolves reality to open a fleeting portal into an alternate world swirling with unknowable mystery, unearthly beauty, and ineffable sadness. At its best, this album feels like a motley and wild-eyed caravan of minstrels, actors, and puppeteers unexpectedly appeared in a medieval town to share a vividly haunting, hallucinatory, and deeply eschatological fairy tale that will be the last thing that any of the villagers ever hear." Writing for Pitchfork, Calum Marsh called it "an arduous but rewarding album, the feeling of listening to a preacher behind the pulpit, or a doomsayer on the soapbox."

== Track listing ==
All tracks are written by Current 93

No.	Title	Length
1.	"The Birds Are Sweetly Singing"	3:45
2.	"The Policeman Is Dead"	5:28
3.	"Bright Dead Star"	4:22
4.	"30 Red Houses"	3:19
5.	"A Thousand Witches"	5:45
6.	"Your Future Cartoon"	2:49
7.	"The Postman Is Singing"	5:59
8.	"The Bench and the Fetch"	4:01
9.	"The Kettle's On"	3:49
10.	"Fair Weather"	4:49
11.	"The Milkmaid Sings"	1:59
Total length:		46:05

Notes

- "The Policeman Is Dead" contains a sample of "A Blacksmith Courted Me" by Phoebe Smith, courtesy of Sweet David Suff and Topic Records.

== Personnel ==
Credits adapted from liner notes.

Musicians

- David Tibet – vocals
- Andrew Liles – electric guitar, electronics
- Alasdair Roberts – vocals, acoustic guitar, electric guitar, drone hurdy gurdy, guzheng
- Reinier Van Houdt – Fender Rhodes electric piano, piano, theremin, synthesizer, bass
- Michael J. York – bagpipes, whistle, duduk, bells
- Aloma Ruiz Boada – violin
- Rita Knuistingh Neven – silent piano, sleep keys, birdlight
- Ben Chasny – doppelgänger electric guitar (8, 10), doppelgänger acoustic guitar (8, 10)
- Ossian Brown – hurdy gurdy
- Thomas Ligotti – ghost, voice

Technical personnel

- David Tibet – production, mixing, cover design, front cover painted photograph The Light Is Leaving Us All, back cover painted photograph The Light Is Leaving Them All, front cover of insert Bella Arises From The Wych Elm, photograph of Ben Chasny
- Andrew Liles – production, mixing, engineering
- The Bricoleur – vinyl mastering
- Stephen Thrower – photograph of Ossian Brown
- Reinier Van Houdt – photograph of Rita Knuistingh Neven
- David Ligotti – photograph of Thomas Ligotti
- Giulio Di Mauro – tour manager, centerfold photograph of Current 93
- Ania Goszczyńska – cover design, layout
- Patrick Wells – screenprinting
- Paschalis Zervas – typesetting
- Jake Gill – management
- Timothy Mark Lewis – management
- Davide Pepe – films
