= Black Ships Ate the Sky =

Studio album by Current 93
- Released: 23 May 2006
- Genre: Neofolk
- Length: 75:19
- Label: Durtro

Current 93 chronology
How He Loved the Moon (Moonsongs for Jhonn Balance) (2005)	Black Ships Ate the Sky (2006)	Inerrant Rays of Infallible Sun (Blackship Shrinebuilder) (2006)

Alternative cover
- Promotional disc

Professional ratings
Review scores
Source	Rating
AllMusic	4.5/5 stars
Pitchfork Media	(8.0/10)

Black Ships Ate the Sky is a 2006 album by the UK-based musical ensemble Current 93. The album features numerous guest vocalists, such as Anohni, Bonnie 'Prince' Billy, Marc Almond, and Shirley Collins. It features nine versions of the 1816 Appalachian tune Idumæa, with lyrics of a 1763 Methodist hymn by Charles Wesley, each featuring vocals by a different artist. The album was issued in digipak packaging, with a 56-page booklet containing liner notes, lyrics, photographs, and credits.

In order to assist with funding for the album, customers were able to pre-order a copy. These 'subscribers' received a mention in the liner notes, as well as a limited edition extra CD, entitled I Am Black Ship, consisting of alternate versions of the tracks from Black Ships Ate the Sky.

The track "Sunset (The Death of Thumbelina)" was featured on the National Public Radio program All Songs Considered on 10 August 2006.

== Track listing ==
=== Black Ships Ate the Sky ===
No.	Title	Music	Length
1.	"Idumæa" (Vocals: Marc Almond)	Marc Almond/Michael Cashmore/Charles Wesley/David Tibet	3:22
2.	"Sunset (The Death of Thumbelina)"	David Tibet/Ben Chasny	3:18
3.	"Black Ships in the Sky"	David Tibet/Michael Cashmore	3:38
4.	"Then Kill Cæsar"	David Tibet/Ben Chasny	3:58
5.	"Idumæa" (Vocals: Bonnie "Prince" Billy)	Bonnie 'Prince' Billy/Charles Wesley	2:42
6.	"This Autistic Imperium Is Nihil Reich"	David Tibet/Michael Cashmore	4:03
7.	"The Dissolution of the Boat Millions of Years"	David Tibet/Michael Cashmore	3:57
8.	"Idumæa" (Vocals: Baby Dee)	Baby Dee/Charles Wesley	4:19
9.	"Bind Your Tortoise Mouth"	David Tibet/Ben Chasny	2:30
10.	"Idumæa" (Vocals: Anohni)	Anohni Hegarty/Charles Wesley	2:02
11.	"Black Ships Seen Last Year South of Heaven"	David Tibet/Michael Cashmore	4:07
12.	"Abba Amma (Babylon Destroyer)"	David Tibet/Michael Cashmore/William Basinski	3:19
13.	"Idumæa" (Vocals: Clodagh Simonds)	Clodagh Simonds/Charles Wesley	2:35
14.	"Black Ships Were Sinking into Idumæa" (Vocals: Cosey Fanni Tutti)	Part one: David Tibet/Michael Cashmore Part two: Cosey Fanni Tutti/Chris Carter/Charles Wesley	11:05
15.	"The Beautiful Dancing Dust" (Vocals: Anohni)	David Tibet/Anohni Hegarty	0:57
16.	"Idumæa" (Vocals: Pantaleimon)	Andria Degens/Charles Wesley	3:06
17.	"Vauvauvau (Black Ships in Their Harbour)"	David Tibet/Ben Chasny	4:41
18.	"Idumæa" (Vocals: David Tibet)	David Tibet/Ben Chasny/William Basinski/Charles Wesley	1:50
19.	"Black Ships Ate the Sky"	David Tibet/Charles Wesley	4:20
20.	"Why Cæsar Is Burning Part II"	David Tibet/Michael Cashmore	2:48
21.	"Idumæa" (Vocals: Shirley Collins)	Shirley Collins/Charles Wesley	2:42

=== I Am Black Ship ===
No.	Title	Length
1.	"Eaten Sky" (Instrumental Introduction)
2.	"Idumæa" (Alternative Vocals: David Tibet)
3.	"Black Ships in the Sky (alternate version)"
4.	"The Dissolution of the Boat Millions of Years"
5.	"South of Heaven (Instrumental Edit)"
6.	"'Prototypes' Outtake"
7.	"This Autistic Imperium Is Nihil Reich (alternate version)"
8.	"5 Hypnagogue 5 (alternate version)"
9.	"'Pale Sky' Outtake"
10.	"Black Ship Skips to Armageddon"
11.	"I Am Black Ship" (Alternative Vocals II: David Tibet)
12.	"Idumæa"

== Personnel ==
- David Tibet – voice, guitars (track 19), electric leaking voices passim, mixing
- Michael Cashmore – guitars (tracks 1, 3, 6, 7, 11, 12, 14, and 20), slide guitar (track 3), bass guitar (track 20)
- Ben Chasny – guitar (track 2, 4, 9, 17, and 18)
- John Contreras – cello
- Steven Stapleton – goatheard, mixing
- Marc Almond – voice (track 1)
- Bonnie 'Prince' Billy – voice and banjo and tambura (track 5)
- Baby Dee – voice and harp (track 8)
- Ida Mercer – cello (track 8)
- Anohni – voice (tracks 10 and 15), harp (track 15)
- Clodagh Simonds – voice and psaltery and zither and harmonium (track 13)
- Cosey Fanni Tutti – voice and musics (track 14)
- Chris Carter – musics (track 14)
- Andria Degens – voice and appalachian dulcimer and harmonica (track 16)
- Shirley Collins – voice (track 21)
- Iris Bishop – concertina (track 21)
- Amy Phillips – subliminal threnodic voice (tracks 14 and 19)
- William Breeze – viola (tracks 17 and 19)
- William Basinski – 9.28.82 galaxial compositions (tracks 12 and 18)
- Colin Potter – mixing
- Mark Logan – astral projection production
- Al Cisneros – astral projection production
- Tina Gordon – astral projection production
- John Contreras – cello arrangements

== Black Ships Eat the Sky ==
In December 2006, Current 93 released an "alternate version" of the album titled Black Ships Eat the Sky. This limited edition record features different versions and a different mix of the album, which Tibet described as "far more intimate and more emphatically acoustic than the original version." The songs of Black Ships Eat the Sky have the same titles (unlisted on the CD cover itself - only available online) as their …Ate the Sky counterparts, with the exception that track 20 is titled "Why Cæsar is Burning Part I".
