= Nature and Organisation =

Creative works of British musician Michael Cashmore

Nature and Organisation is the creative musical works of British musician Michael Cashmore. The music of Nature and Organisation is characterized by a mix of acoustic, classical and folk structures met with abrasive electronic instrumentation.

== Overview ==
Cashmore has also been a member of the group Current 93 since the late 1980s. He has collaborated with many artists, including David Tibet, Douglas Pearce, Steven Stapleton, Antony Hegarty, Marc Almond and Rose McDowall. Cashmore wrote most of the music for Current 93 after the departure of Douglas Pearce in the 1990s.

During a long silence after 1998, it was unclear if Nature and Organisation still existed, as the official Nature and Organisation website was no longer online, and Cashmore released no official statements since the release of the 1998 album, Death in a Snow Leopard Winter. Since then World Serpent Distribution has dissolved and all Nature and Organisation material is out of print.

In 2006, after breaking his silence with a new official MySpace page, Michael Cashmore released a new album under his own name entitled Sleep England on Durtro Jnana Records. This was followed in 2007 with the mini-album "The Snow Abides" with vocals by Antony Hegarty, and a collaborative album in 2008, Gabriel and The Lunatic Lover with singer Marc Almond.

In 2015, the German label Trisol released the long-awaited CD reissue of the complete World Serpent recordings by Nature and Organisation including the two albums "Beauty Reaps the Blood of Solitude" and "Death in a Snow Leopard Winter" along with the "A Dozen Summers Against the World" EP and another compilation-only track. Entitled "Snow Leopard Messiah," the double-CD set features lyrics and entirely new artwork by Michael Cashmore.

Nature and Organisation's third album, Beauty Reaps the Blood of Solitude, was reviewed by a Sputnikmusic staff member, who remarked, "On this album the usually closely parallel lines of neofolk and industrial begin to cross paths, a stylistic turn that could perhaps be attributed to the contributions of Pearce".

== Discography ==
=== Albums and EPs ===
Year	Title	Format, Special Notes
1986	Third Terminal Position	Live recordings and early material, cassette.
1994	A Dozen Summers Against the World	EP, CD 5"
1994	Beauty Reaps the Blood of Solitude	LP, CD
1998	Death in a Snow Leopard Winter	Incomplete LP.
2006	Michael Cashmore - Sleep England	CD
2007	Michael Cashmore - The Snow Abides	MiniCD
2008	Marc Almond with Michael Cashmore - Gabriel and The Lunatic Lover	CDEP

=== Compilations ===
Year	Title	Format, Special Notes
1996	Terra Serpentes	2CD
1996	Untitled	CD 5", 2000 copies.
1998	Electronic Behaviour Control System Volume 1	CD
2015	Snow Leopard Messiah	2CD reissue
