= Love's Small Song =

Studio album by Baby Dee
- Released: 2002
- Recorded: 2001, Cleveland, OH
- Genre: Indie folk, baroque pop, experimental rock
- Length: Disc 1: 43:13; Disc 2: 55:28
- Label: Durtro
- Producer: Baby Dee

Baby Dee chronology
Little Window (2001)	Love's Small Song (2002)	Safe Inside the Day (2008)

Professional ratings
Review scores
Source	Rating
Allmusic	4.5/5 stars

Love's Small Song is the second studio album by American singer-songwriter Baby Dee. The album was released in 2002 and consisted of two discs. The first disc contains songs composed and performed by Dee, while the second disc contains a singular 55-minute sound collage of birdsongs, specifically robins' songs. All recordings used were recorded in the backyard of Dee's mother's home in Cleveland.

Love's Small Song is currently out of print as a lone album. The first disc has been compiled in its entirety with Little Window and Made for Love as the 2-CD set The Robin's Tiny Throat, released by Durtro Jnana in 2007. The second disc is available as The Robins' Song, released by Drag City in 2008.

== Track listing ==
All songs composed by Baby Dee.

Disc 1:

1. "The Moon and the Morning Star" – 3:52
2. "So Bad" – 3:37
3. "Look What the Wind Blew In" – 3:01
4. "When I Get Home" – 5:08
5. "My Heart's Come Home" – 4:02
6. "Like Morning All Day Long" – 2:55
7. "Small Wonder" – 3:57
8. "Half a Chance" – 5:29
9. "My Love Has Made a Fool of Me" – 5:24
10. "April Day" – 5:48

Disc 2:

1. "Untitled" – 55:28

== Personnel ==
- Baby Dee – vocals, piano, harp, accordion, bird calls

== Influence ==
- John Darnielle, frontman of The Mountain Goats, has called Love's Small Song one of his favorite albums.
- "So Bad" was covered by Shearwater on their 2008 EP The Snow Leopard.
