= Halo (Current 93 album) =

Live album by Current 93
- Released: 2004
- Genre: Apocalyptic folk

Current 93 chronology
Live at St. Olave's (2003)	Halo (2004)	SixSixSix: SickSickSick (2004)

Professional ratings
Review scores
Source	Rating
AllMusic	4/5 stars
Pitchfork Media	(7.8/10)

Halo is a live album by Current 93, released in 2004. The cover is a drawing by David Tibet, which reproduces the cover of The Moody Blues' 1971 album Every Good Boy Deserves Favour.

== Track listing ==
1. "Halo"
2. "Alone"
3. "Mary Waits in Silence"
4. "Calling for Vanished Faces II"
5. "The Signs in the Stars"
6. "All This World Makes Great Blood"
7. "Good Morning, Great Moloch"
8. "Whilst the Night Rejoices Profound and Still"
9. "5 Hypnagogue 5"
10. "Silence Song"
11. "Sleep Has His House"
12. "4 Hypnagogue 4"
13. "Fields of Rape"
14. "So: This Empire Is Nothing"
15. "Death of the Corn"
16. "Locust"

== Personnel ==
- David Tibet – vocals
- Michael Cashmore – guitar, bass
- Maja Elliott – piano
- Joe Budenholzer – guitar
- Graham Jeffery – piano
- Joolie Wood – violin, whistle, recorder
- John Contreras – cello
- Karl Blake – vocals
- Finn Sands – vocals
- Michael Lawrence – sound
- Lauren Winton – visuals
- Cosey Tutti Fanni
- Chris Carter
