= Little Window =

Studio album by Baby Dee
- Released: 2001
- Recorded: August–October 2000, Cleveland, OH
- Genres: Indie folk, baroque pop, experimental rock
- Length: 48:45
- Label: Durtro
- Producer: Baby Dee

Baby Dee chronology
Little Window (2001)	Love's Small Song (2002)

Professional ratings
Review scores
Source	Rating
Allmusic	4/5 stars

Little Window is the debut album of American singer-songwriter Baby Dee. The album was released in 2001 on the Durtro label. It was produced, composed, and performed entirely by Dee.

Little Window is currently out of print as a lone album. It has been compiled in its entirety with Love's Small Song and Made for Love as the 2-CD set The Robin's Tiny Throat, released by Durtro Jnana in 2007.

== Track listing ==
All songs composed by Baby Dee.

1. "Hymn to Anne" – 4:21
2. "Little Window" – 5:18
3. "The Robin's Tiny Throat" – 5:19
4. "Calvary" – 4:33
5. "A Weakness for Roses" – 8:40
6. "The Price of a Sparrow" – 2:38
7. "What About My Father" – 8:02
8. "Waiting" – 9:54

== Personnel ==
- Baby Dee – vocals, piano, accordion, bird calls
