= A Book of Songs for Anne Marie =

Studio album by Baby Dee
- Released: April 20, 2010
- Genre: Indie folk Baroque pop
- Length: 45:10
- Label: Drag City (US); Tin Angel (UK)
- Producer: Maxim Moston

Baby Dee chronology
Safe Inside the Day (2008)	A Book of Songs for Anne Marie (2010)	Regifted Light (2011)

A Book of Songs for Anne Marie is the fourth studio album by American singer-songwriter Baby Dee. It was released on April 20, 2010 under the Drag City label in the US and on Tin Angel Records in the UK. The album is essentially a re-recording of a 150 copy limited-edition CD that was released by Durtro in 2004 with a book of the same name.

Professional ratings
Review scores
Source	Rating
Drowned in Sound	6/10 stars
NME	7/10 stars
Pitchfork Media	(7.9/10)
Prefix	6/10 stars
The Quietus	(very positive)
The Sunday Times	4/5 stars

== Track listing ==
All songs composed by Baby Dee.
Arrangements by Maxim Moston and Baby Dee.

No.	Title	Length
1.	"Overture"	2:08
2.	"Love's Small Song"	3:07
3.	"A Book of Songs for Anne Marie"	3:41
4.	"Lilacs"	3:41
5.	"Unheard of Hope"	4:34
6.	"Black but Comely"	5:05
7.	"And Anne Marie Does Love to Sing"	5:50
8.	"Endless Night"	4:36
9.	"Set Me As a Seal"	3:58
10.	"As Morning Holds a Star"	3:36
11.	"An Early Spring"	2:13
12.	"Morning Fire"	2:41

=== 2004 Version ===
This version was released as a limited-edition book with CD. It features only Baby Dee, singing and playing piano.

No.	Title	Length
1.	"Love's Small Song" (This song was divided into three separate songs on the 2010 album)	7:01
2.	"Lilacs"	4:06
3.	"Black but Comely"	4:47
4.	"Unheard of Hope"	5:36
5.	"And Anne Marie Does Love to Sing"	4:47
6.	"Endless Night"	5:02
7.	"Set Me As a Seal on Your Heart"	3:34

== Personnel ==
- Baby Dee – vocals, harp, piano, accordion
- Keith Bonner – flute
- C.J. Camerieri – trumpet, French horn
- John Contreras – cello
- Alexandra Knoll – oboe, English horn
- Rob Moose – mandolin
- Maxim Moston – violin
