= Baby D =

Baby D or Baby Dee may refer to:

- Baby D (dance group), a dance group from the UK
- Baby D (rapper), an underground rapper from Atlanta
- Baby D, a fictional character in the 2000 film Next Friday
- Baby Dee, a performance artist, multi-instrumentalist and singer-songwriter
