= L.A.Y.L.A.H. Antirecords =

- Parent company: Les Disques du Crepuscule
- Founded: 1984
- Status: Defunct
- Genre: Industrial; Experimental
- Country of origin: Belgium

L.A.Y.L.A.H. Antirecords is a defunct Belgian record label, started by Marc Monin, notable for releasing early work from several renowned industrial/experimental artists such as Coil, Nurse With Wound, Current 93 and Laibach.

L.A.Y.L.A.H. operated as a sub-label of Les Disques du Crépuscule for manufacturing and distribution, but A&R was independent of Crépuscule.

== Catalog ==
Catalog number	Artist	Release title	Format	Release date
LAY 01	Current 93	LAShTAL	12" vinyl	1984
LAY 02	Laibach	Boji / Sila / Brat Moj	12" vinyl	1984
LAY 03	Nurse With Wound	Gyllensköld Geijerstam and I at Rydbergs	12" vinyl	1984 May
LAY 04	Current 93	Nature Unveiled	12" vinyl	1984
LAY 05	Coil	How to Destroy Angels	12" vinyl	1984
LAY 06	Current 93 & Nurse With Wound	No Hiding from the Blackbird / Burial of the Sardine	7" vinyl	1984
LAY 07	Nurse With Wound	Brained by Falling Masonry	12" vinyl	1984
LAY 08	93 Current 93	Dogs Blood Rising	12" vinyl	1984
LAY 09	Robert Haigh	Juliet of the Spirits	12" vinyl	1985
LAY 10	(various)	The Fight Is On	12" vinyl	1985
LAY 12	Organum	Tower of Silence	12" vinyl	1985
LAY 13	The Hafler Trio	Soundtrack To "Alternation, Perception, And Resistance" - A Comprehension Exercise	12" vinyl	1985 March
LAY 14	Current 93 split with Sickness of Snakes (John Balance, Peter Christopherson and Boyd Rice)	Nightmare Culture	12" vinyl	1985
LAY 15	Nurse With Wound	The Sylvie and Babs Hi-Fi Companion	2x12" vinyl	1985
LAY 17	The Hafler Trio	Seven Hours Sleep	12" vinyl	1985 October
LAY 18	Current 93	Happy Birthday Pigface Christus	12" vinyl	1986
LAY 19	Organum	In Extremis	12" vinyl	1985
LAY 20	Current 93	Swastikas For Noddy	12" vinyl	1988
LAY 21	Robert Haigh	Music From The Ante Chamber	12" vinyl	1988
LAY 22	Organum	Horii	12" vinyl	1986
LAY 23	23 Skidoo	The Culling Is Coming	12" vinyl	1988
LAY 24	Sol Invictus	Against The Modern World	12" vinyl	1987
LAY 29	The Aryan Aquarians	Meet Their Waterloo	12" vinyl	1987 June
LAY 30	Nurse With Wound	Gyllenskold / Brained	12" vinyl	1989
LAYCD 08	Current 93	Dogs Blood Rising	CD	1988
LAYCD 15	Nurse With Wound	The Sylvie and Babs Hi-Fi Companion	CD	1988
LAYCD 20	Current 93	Swastikas For Noddy	CD	1988
LAYCD 23	23 Skidoo	The Culling Is Coming	CD	1988
LAYCD 30	Nurse With Wound	Gyllenskold / Brained	CD	1989
