= Chimé Rigdzin =

Indian lama of Tibetan Buddhism (1922–2002)

- Title: Khordong Tertrul IV

Personal life
- Born: 1922, Kham Region of Tibet
- Died: 2002, Shivmandir Siliguri Darjeeling, West Bengal India
- Other name: C. R. Lama

Religious life
- Religion: Buddhism
- School: Tibetan
- Sect: Nyingma; Jangter ("Northern Treasure")

Chimé Rigdzin Rinpoche (Wylie: ’chi med rig ’dzin, Eng: Immortal Vidyadhara; 1922-2002), popularly known as C. R. Lama, was an Indian lama of Tibetan Buddhism who was the lineage holder of the Northern Treasures (Wylie: byang gter) tradition in the Nyingma school of Tibetan Buddhism.

== Biography ==
At the age of four he was recognized and enthroned as the 4th incarnation of Khordong Terchen Nüden Dorjé Dropen Lingpa (Wylie: nus ldan rdo rje 'gro phan gling pa) the main re-incarnate lama of Khordong Monastery in Kham, Tibet, located in today's Sichuan province. At seven years old he had already started discovering spiritual treasures (terma) hidden by Padmasambhava. He was mostly trained by Tülku Tsurlo (Wylie: sPrul sku Tshul khrims bzang po, 1895-1954) and completed his education at the age of 19 with the degree of Dorje Lopön Chenpo. Shortly after, he left the monastery to enter into a traditional three-year retreat at Tsö Pema (Rewalsar) in India. Following that he visited many Buddhist pilgrimage sites in Tibet, Sikkim, Bhutan and India as a wandering ngakpa. Later he settled with his family in Kalimpong, West Bengal and became an Indian citizen. From 1954 to 1987 C. R. Lama was head of the Department for Indo-Tibetan studies at Visva-Bharati University in Santiniketan, West Bengal. In the late 1950s he was invited by Giuseppe Tucci to teach in Rome. During that time he met Pope John XXIII. In the following year he was invited to teach at LMU Munich by Helmut Hoffman. During the 1970s he had a number of American and European students at Visva-Bharati University, including James Low and Ngakpa Chögyam, who also became his religious disciples.

After his retirement in 1987, C.R. Lama regularly visited Europe, where he guided a small groups of pupils in different countries.

== Literature ==
- C.R. Lama, 'Khor-gdon Gter-sprul 'Chi-med-rig-'dzin; Gnubs-Chen Sangs-rgyas-ye-shes (1974). Rnal 'byor mig gibsam gtan or Bsam gtan mig sgron : a treatise on bhāvanā and dhyāna and the relationships between the various approaches to Buddhist contemplative practice. Smanrtsis shesrig spendzod. Vol. 74. Leh, Ladakh: S. W. Tashigangpa. OCLC 466391420.
- C.R. Lama (1977). Gso sbyon ʼdon sgrigs : the rites of the gso sbyoṅ observance of the Rñiṅ-ma-pa tradition. Nemo, Ladakh: T.S. Tashigang. OCLC 4747263.
- C.R. Lama (1982). Dhammapada. Dalai Lama Tibeto-Indological series. Vol. 4. Sāranātha: Kendrīya Ucca Tibbatī-Śikshā-Saṃsthāna. OCLC 21149457.
- The Venerable `Chimed Rig'dzin Lama Rinpoche (1988). Current 93 present Tantric rNying.ma Chant Of Tibet (LP). Maldoror.
- C.R. Lama; Low, James; ʼGro-phan-gling-pa, ʼKhor-gdong Gter-chen (2006). Being Guru Rinpoche : a commentary on the Vidyadhara Guru Sadhana. Khordong commentary series. Vol. 3. Victoria, B.C.: Trafford. ISBN 9781412084079. OCLC 70231260.
- C.R. Lama; Low, James (2013). Collected works of C.R. Lama. London: Simply Being. ISBN 9780956923929. OCLC 864086431.
