= Safe Inside the Day =

Studio album by Baby Dee
- Released: January 22, 2008
- Recorded: August 2007, Brooklyn, NY
- Genres: Indie folk, baroque pop, cabaret
- Length: 48:44
- Label: Drag City
- Producers: Matt Sweeney & Bonnie 'Prince' Billy

Baby Dee chronology
Love's Small Song (2002)	Safe Inside the Day (2008)	A Book of Songs for Anne Marie (2010)

Professional ratings
Review scores
Source	Rating
Allmusic	3.5/5 stars
The Observer	4/5 stars
Paste Magazine	(positive)
Pitchfork Media	(7.4/10)
PopMatters	(7/10)
Prefix	(7.0/10)
Slant Magazine	3/5 stars
The Sunday Times	4/5 stars
Tiny Mix Tapes	4/5 stars
Uncut	3/5 stars

Safe Inside the Day is the third studio album by American singer-songwriter Baby Dee. Released on January 21, 2008, it was her debut album on the Drag City label. It was Dee's first album to feature collaborators. It was produced by and features Will Oldham and Matt Sweeney. It also features friend and future producer Andrew WK on bass and drums.

== Track listing ==
All songs written by Baby Dee.

1. "Safe Inside the Day" – 6:22
2. "The Earlie King" – 5:27
3. "A Compass of the Light" – 3:34
4. "The Only Bones That Show" – 5:18
5. "Fresh out of Candles" – 6:04
6. "Big Titty Bee Girl (from Dino Town)" – 3:02
7. "Christmas Jig for a Three-Legged Cat" – 1:14
8. "Flowers on the Tracks" – 4:02
9. "The Dance of Diminishing Possibilities" – 4:11
10. "Bad Kidneys" – 4:36
11. "You'll Find Your Footing" – 4:54

== Personnel ==
- Baby Dee – vocals (1–6,9-11), piano (1–9,11), harp (8,9), accordion (10), fender rhodes (10), bird calls (10), maniacal laughter (10)
- Bonnie 'Prince' Billy – vocals (1,2,4,5,9,10), fun machine (10)
- Matt Sweeney – guitar (1,3–5,9), banjo (2,9), vocals (2,10), bass (3,9), drums (9,10)
- Andrew WK – bass (1,2,4,5,10,11), drums (3,9)
- Max Moston – violin (1–5,7–9,11)
- Bill Breeze – viola (1–5,9,11)
- John Contreras – cello (1–5,7–9,11)
- Robbie Lee – woodwinds (2,4,5,7,10)
- Lia Kessel – vocals (2,4,9)
- James Lo – drums (2,4,5)
- Reggae Paul – drum fill (2,(0.39)), guest bass slide (11, (0.59))
