= The Cloud of Unknowing (album) =

Studio album by James Blackshaw
- Released: June 5, 2007
- Recorded: August 2006
- Genre: Folk
- Length: 42:41
- Label: Tompkins Square

James Blackshaw chronology
O True Believers (2006)	The Cloud of Unknowing (2007)	Litany of Echoes (2008)

Professional ratings
Review scores
Source	Rating
AllMusic	4/5 stars
Dusted Magazine	(favorable)
Pitchfork Media	(8.7/10)
The Times	4/5 stars

The Cloud of Unknowing is the fifth studio album from James Blackshaw and takes its title from a medieval book. It was released in the United States on June 5, 2007.

== Track listing ==
1. "The Cloud of Unknowing" – 10:55
2. "Running to the Ghost" – 6:16
3. "Clouds Collapse" – 3:56
4. "The Mirror Speaks" – 6:31
5. "Stained Glass Windows" – 15:03
