= Litany of Echoes =

Studio album by James Blackshaw
- Released: June 17, 2008
- Recorded: December 2007
- Genre: Folk
- Length: 53:06
- Label: Tompkins Square

James Blackshaw chronology
The Cloud of Unknowing (2007)	Litany of Echoes (2008)	The Glass Bead Game (2009)

Professional ratings
Review scores
Source	Rating
AllMusic	2008
The A.V. Club	B 2008
Billboard	favorable 2008
Cokemachineglow	77% 2008
Dusted Magazine	favorable 2008
Pitchfork Media	8.3/10 2008
New York Times	2008
Variety	favorable 2008

Litany of Echoes is the sixth studio album from James Blackshaw. It was released in the United States on June 17, 2008.

== Track listing ==
1. "Gate of Ivory" – 5:20
2. "Past Has Not Passed" – 12:38
3. "Echo and Abyss" – 12:10
4. "Infinite Circle" – 5:54
5. "Shroud" – 11:44
6. "Gate of Horn" – 5:20
