= Current 93 =

English experimental music group

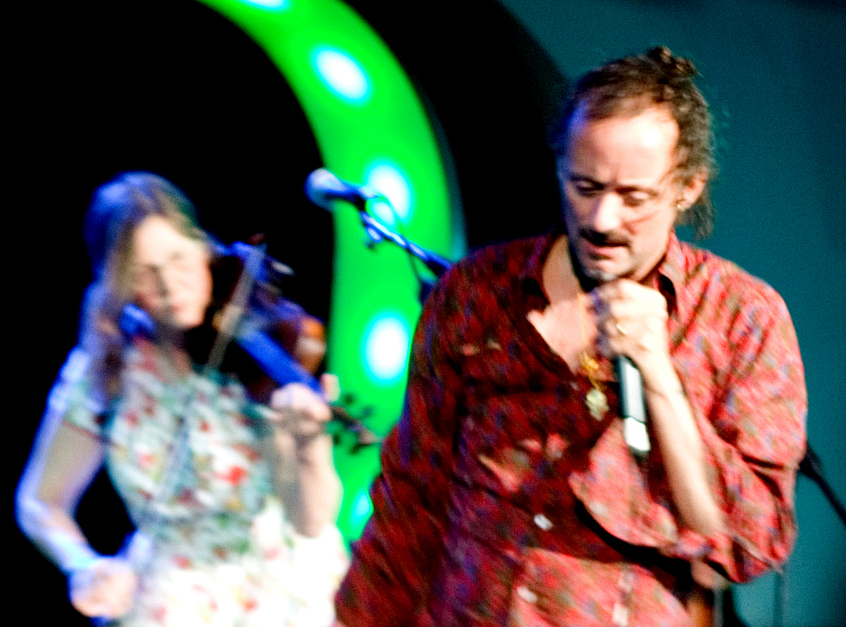
- Current 93 in 2006

Background information
- Origin: London, England
- Genres: Neofolk; experimental; psychedelic folk; post-industrial; noise
- Years active: 1982–present
- Labels: Coptic Cat; Durtro; United Dairies; Jnana; L.A.Y.L.A.H. Antirecords; Beta-lactam Ring
- Members: David Tibet
- Past members: Steven Stapleton; Michael Cashmore; Douglas P.; Rose McDowall; Christoph Heemann; William Breeze; Tony Wakeford; Maja Elliott; Graham Jeffery; Joolie Wood

Current 93 are an English experimental music group, founded in 1982 by David Tibet. Much of Current 93's early work was similar to late 1970s and early 1980s industrial music: abrasive tape loops, droning synthesizer noises and Tibet's distorted, excoriating vocals. In the mid-'80s, Current 93's sound shifted to a style Tibet called "apocalyptic folk", combining folk music with industrial elements and lyrics emphasizing Christianity (particularly mystical and eschatological elements), occultism, and various literary traditions. Tibet has been the only constant member of Current 93, with a wide variety of collaborators joining in over the years. They have released over twenty full-length albums, as well as many other recordings.

== Background ==
Current 93 initially consisted of Tibet, fellow Psychic TV alumnus Jhonn Balance, and 23 Skidoo member Fritz Catlin. Tibet has been the only constant member in the group, though Steven Stapleton (of Nurse with Wound) appeared on nearly every Current 93 release until 2010. Michael Cashmore was also a long-term contributor starting with Thunder Perfect Mind. Douglas P. of Death in June has played on well over a dozen Current 93 releases.

Tibet's lyrics have been fairly consistent, regardless of delivery: The earlier recordings reflect his preoccupation with death, Christ, mysticism, Aleister Crowley (Tibet borrowed the term "93 Current" from Crowley – the 93 Current being the current of Thelema or Agape), Tibetan Buddhism, Gnosticism, runes, swastikas, Noddy, The Wicker Man, and a variety of occult notions. The later to present-day period of Current 93's recordings increasingly reflect Tibet's interest in Christian mysticism and apocalypse. Tibet has stated that he identifies as a Christian.

Literary influences include Lautreamont's Les Chants de Maldoror, the Bible and its apocrypha, The Poetic Eddas, the Child Ballads, Hildegard von Bingen, Yukio Mishima, John Dee's De Heptarchia Mystica, The Thunder, Perfect Mind, William Blake, Louis Wain, writer Thomas Ligotti, occult British author Arthur Machen (originator of the title "The Inmost Light"), M.R. James's various ghost stories, The Cloud of Unknowing, Count Eric Stenbock, and Russell Hoban's Riddley Walker.

== Members and collaborators ==
Current 93 recordings often involve a wide range of collaborators, from musicians to occultists. Apart from those mentioned earlier, these have included:

- Alasdair Roberts
- Alex Neilson
- Andrew W.K.
- Andrew Liles
- Annie Anxiety
- Anohni
- Armen Ra
- Baby Dee
- Ben Chasny
- Björk
- Bladee
- Bobbie Watson
- Bogomil Font
- Boyd Rice
- Chimé Rigdzin
- Chris Carter
- Christoph Heemann
- Diana Rogerson
- Clodagh Simonds
- Cosey Fanni Tutti
- Edward Ka-Spel
- Einar Örn
- Freya Aswynn (runologist)
- Godkrist
- Hilmar Örn Hilmarsson
- Ian Read
- Jack Barnett
- James Blackshaw
- John Balance
- John Murphy
- John Zorn
- Johnny Triumph
- Jon Seagroatt
- Karl Blake
- Ken Thomas
- Matt Sweeney
- Nick Cave
- Nick Saloman
- Norbert Kox
- Ossian Brown
- Rickie Lee Jones
- Rose McDowall
- Sasha Grey
- Shirley Collins
- Stephen Emmel
- Steve Ignorant of Crass (as Stephen Intelligent)
- Thomas Ligotti
- Tony McPhee
- Tony Wakeford
- Will Oldham
- William Basinski
- William Breeze
- Youth (Martin Glover)

=== Timeline ===
The chart below focuses on long-term collaborators.

== Discography ==
=== Primary, full-length, Current 93 studio albums ===
- Nature Unveiled (1984)
- Dogs Blood Rising (1984)
- In Menstrual Night (1986)
- Dawn (1987)
- Imperium (1987)
- Christ and the Pale Queens Mighty in Sorrow (1988)
- Swastikas for Noddy (1988)
- Earth Covers Earth (1988)
- Crooked Crosses for the Nodding God (1989)
- Looney Runes (1990)
- Thunder Perfect Mind (1992)
- Of Ruine or Some Blazing Starre (1994)
- All the Pretty Little Horses: The Inmost Light (1996)
- Soft Black Stars (1998)
- Sleep Has His House (2000)
- How He Loved the Moon (Moonsongs for Jhonn Balance) (2005)
- Black Ships Ate the Sky (2006)
- Aleph at Hallucinatory Mountain (2009)
- Baalstorm, Sing Omega (2010)
- HoneySuckle Æons (2011)
- I Am the Last of All the Field That Fell: A Channel (2014)
- The Light Is Leaving Us All (2018)
- If a City Is Set Upon a Hill (2022)
- Sketches of My Nightmares and Dreams Occurring (2024)

=== Full discography ===
Year	Title	Format and special notes
1983	Mi-Mort	cassette split with Nurse with Wound
1984	LAShTAL	12"
1984	Nature Unveiled	LP (reissued on CD,1992)
1984	No Hiding from the Blackbird	7" split w/ Nurse With Wound
1984	Dogs Blood Rising	LP (reissued on CD, 1988 and 1995)
1985	Live at Bar Maldoror	LP (reissued on CD 1990 and 1994)
1985	Nightmare Culture	EP split with Sickness of Snakes (Coil/Boyd Rice)
1986	In Menstrual Night	LP (reissued on CD, 1994)
1986	NL Centrum-Amsterdam	live cassette split w/ Nurse With Wound
1987	Happy Birthday	12"
1987	Dawn	LP (reissued on CD, 1994)
1987	Imperium	LP (reissued on CD, 2001)
1987	Crowleymass (with HÖH)	12"/CDS (reissued in 1997)
1988	Christ and the Pale Queens Mighty in Sorrow	2xLP (reissued on CD, 1994)
1988	The Red Face of God	12" (reissued on CD with above, 1994)
1988	Swastikas for Noddy	LP (reissued on CD as Swastikas for Goddy, 1993)
1988	Faith's Favourites	12" split with Nurse with Wound
1988	Earth Covers Earth	LP (reissued on CD, 1992) (limited LP reissue, 2005)
1989	Rome/Hourglass for Diana/Fields of Rape	7" (live)
1989	She Is Dead and All Fall Down	limited edition 7"
1989	Crooked Crosses for the Nodding God	CD
1990	Looney Runes	LP, CD 1992
1990	1888	split EP with Death in June
1990	Horse	LP, part of a box set/split with Sol Invictus and Nurse With Wound (reissued on CD as Horsey with extra/reworked tracks, 1997)
1991	Island (with HÖH)	LP/CD
1991	As the World Disappears (live)	CD
1992	Thunder Perfect Mind	2xLP/CD (reissued, 1994)
1992	Death in June / Current 93 / Sol Invictus (live)	Recorded in Frankfurt, Germany, 1991. Originally a bootleg called Day of Dawn, officially reissued on CD.
1993	Emblems: The Menstrual Years	LP, issued as 2xCD retrospective
1993	Hitler as Kalki	CD
1994	Of Ruine or Some Blazing Starre	LP/CD
1994	The Fire of the Mind	CD/MiniAlbum
1994	Lucifer Over London	EP/CD
1994	Tamlin	12"/CDS
1995	Where The Long Shadows Fall	12"/CDS
1996	All The Pretty Little Horses: The Inmost Light	LP/CD
1996	The Starres Are Marching Sadly Home	12"/CDS
1996	Untitled, a.k.a. Seven Seals	CD-EP with Tiny Tim, Nurse with Wound and Nature and Organization
1997	In a Foreign Town, in a Foreign Land	limited CD, accompanied Thomas Ligotti book of same name
1998	Soft Black Stars	LP/CD/sheet music, (reissued on CD in 2005)
1999	Calling for Vanished Faces	2xCD retrospective
1999	An Introduction to Suffering	Current 93/Michael Cashmore/Christoph Heemann LP/CD
1999	Misery Farm	CDS
1999	All Dolled Up Like Christ	2x Live CD
2000	I Have a Special Plan for This World	12"/CD, Thomas Ligotti prose poem read by Tibet, treated by Current 93
2000	Sleep Has His House	LP/CD
2000	Faust	LP/CD
2001	The Great in the Small	LP/CD
2001	Cats Drunk on Copper	CD (Live at the Union Chapel, London, 3 May 1997)
2001	Bright Yellow Moon	2x12"/CD Current 93/Nurse with Wound
2001	Purtle	CD Split w/ Nurse with Wound
2001	This Degenerate Little Town	CD with Thomas Ligotti
2002	The Seahorse Rears to Oblivion	12"/CD
2002	Music for the Horse Hospital	2xCD Current 93/Nurse with Wound
2003	A Little Menstrual Night Music	CD containing remixes of tracks from In Menstrual Night
2003	Calling For Vanished Faces/Virgin Mary	7" split with Antony and the Johnsons; UK PanDurtro 008
2003	Live at St. Olave's	CD EP split with Antony and the Johnsons; UK PanDurtro 007
2004	Halo	Live CD
2004	SixSixSix: SickSickSick	CD compilation of Tamlin, Lucifer over London, Misery Farm, and two pieces from Looney Runes
2005	How I Devoured Apocalypse Balloon	2xCD (Live at St. George The Martyr Anglican Church, Toronto, 18–19 June 2004)
2005	ⲛⲧⲛⲁⲩ ⲛϩⲱⲧⲡ ⲙⲡⲣⲏ ⲁϩⲉⲛⲉϫⲏⲩ ⲉⲩⲕⲏⲙ ⲟⲩⲉⲙ ⲧⲡⲉ	CDS (promo for Black Ships Ate the Sky; the Coptic title reads "At Sunset Black Ships Ate The Sky")
2005	Judas as Black Moth (Hallucinatory Patripassianist Song)	2xCD "best of"/introduction to C93's works
2005	How He Loved The Moon	2xCD/2xLP (ltd. 1200)/2xLP+7" (ltd. 200), a remixed version of In Menstrual Night
2005	Hypnagogue/Hypnagogue II	CD
2006	Black Ships Ate the Sky	CD / 2xLP
2006	Inerrant Rays of Infallible Sun	Split 10" with Om
2006	Black Ships Eat the Sky	CD – Alternate mixes
2007	The Inmost Light	3xCD/2xLP reissue of Where The Long Shadows Fall, All the Pretty Little Horses, and The Starres Are Marching Sadly Home
2007	Birdsong in The Empire	Live CD (ltd. 1200) Recorded in Toronto, Canada, 2005
2008	Black Ships Heat the Dancefloor	Blue 12-inch single/DualDisc, remixes by JG Thirlwell and Matmos
2008	Birth Canal Blues	CD EP April 2008
2009	Aleph at Hallucinatory Mountain	CD/LP
2010	Baalstorm, Sing Omega	CD/LP
2010	Haunted Waves, Moving Graves	Limited-edition CD (999 copies) and 12" picture disc (666 copies). Both editions have different track listings.
2010	When the May Rain Comes	12" purple & white vinyl (200 copies). 12" purple vinyl (300 copies). 12" black vinyl (500 copies). CD EP (Deluxe Digipak 6 panel).
2011	HoneySuckle Æons	Released 24 March 2011
2012	When Rome Falls, Falls the World	Live CD
2014	I Am the Last of All the Field That Fell: A Channel	CD/LP
2015	The Moons at Your Door	CD/LP
2018	The Light Is Leaving Us All	CD/LP
2019	Invocations of Almost	CD/LP (the 12-inch LP has a slightly shorter version and mix than the 59-minute CD)
2022	If a City Is Set Upon a Hill	CD/LP
2024	Sketches of My Nightmares and Dreams Occurring	CD/LP/cassette

=== Compilation appearances ===
- "Black Ships Ate the Sky (Alternate Mix)" on Brainwaves (2006)

=== Current 93 Presents releases ===
- 1986 Aleister Crowley – The Hastings Archives/The World As Power LP
- 1988 The Venerable 'Chi.med Rig. 'dzin Lama, Rinpoche – Tantric rNying.ma Chant of Tibet LP/CD
- 1990 Harry Oldfield – Crystal LP/CD
- 1990 Sveinbjörn Beinteinsson – Edda LP/CD
- 1992 Shirley Collins – Fountain of Snow CD
- 1995 Tiny Tim – Songs of an Impotent Troubadour CD
- 1997 The Aryan Aquarians – Meet Their Waterloo LP/CD
