= Regifted Light =

Studio album by Baby Dee
- Released: March 22, 2011
- Recorded: January 2010; Cleveland, OH
- Genre: Baroque pop, cabaret
- Length: 33:25
- Label: Drag City
- Producer: Andrew WK

Baby Dee chronology
A Book of Songs for Anne Marie (2010)	Regifted Light (2011)

Professional ratings
Review scores
Source	Rating
Allmusic	4/5 stars
Pitchfork Media	(8.0/10)
PopMatters	(8/10)
Tiny Mix Tapes	3.5/5 stars

Regifted Light is the fifth studio album by American singer-songwriter Baby Dee. It was released on March 22, 2011 on the Drag City label. The album was produced by friend and collaborator Andrew WK. The songs were performed on a Steinway D grand piano that WK gave to Dee. The album was recorded in Dee's home with a small backing band.

== Track listing ==
All songs composed by Baby Dee.

1. "Cowboys with Cowboy Hat Hair" – 3:45
2. "Yapapipi" – 5:17
3. "Regifted Light" – 3:09
4. "Coughing Up Cat Hair" – 1:33
5. "Deep Peaceful" – 2:08
6. "Brother Slug and Sister Snail" – 4:54
7. "Lullaby Parade" – 2:53
8. "On the Day I Died" – 2:50
9. "Horn Pipe" – 0:45
10. "The Pie Song" – 2:13
11. "Cowboy Street" – 1:16
12. "The Move" – 2:50

== Personnel ==
- Baby Dee – piano, vocals
- Andrew WK – pump organ, percussion
- Matthew Robinson – cello
- Mark Messing – tuba, sousaphone, bassoon
- Jon Steinmeir – glockenspiel, danmo, melodica, percussion
