= Mockingjay (disambiguation) =

Mockingjay is a 2010 novel by Suzanne Collins titled after a fictional bird species featured in the story.

Mockingjay may also refer to:

- The Hunger Games: Mockingjay – Part 1 (2014), the first half of a two-part film adaptation of the novel
- The Hunger Games: Mockingjay – Part 2 (2015), the second half of a two-part film adaptation of the novel
- Katniss Everdeen or the Mockingjay, the protagonist of the Hunger Games trilogy
- Mockingjay, a cache replacement policy in computers

== See also ==
- Mockingbird (disambiguation)
