= Mi-Mort =

EP by Current 93 / Nurse with Wound
- Released: 1983
- Genre: Industrial, experimental
- Length: 46:04
- Label: Mi-Mort

Current 93 / Nurse with Wound chronology
Mi-Mort (1983)	LAShTAL (1984)

Mi-Mort is a split EP by the bands Current 93 and Nurse with Wound. It contains one track by Current 93 and four tracks by Nurse with Wound. It was released as a cassette in 1983, and was re-issued in 1984, 1985 and 1986.

== Track listing ==
Side A

1. "Maldoror est Mort" - Current 93 – 17:31

Side B

1. "Ooh Baby (Coo Coo)" - Nurse with Wound – 6:12
2. "Fashioned to a Device Behind a Tree" - Nurse with Wound – 7:22
3. "I Was No Longer His Dominant" - Nurse with Wound – 8:39
4. "A Snake in Your Abdomen" - Nurse with Wound – 6:20
