= LAShTAL =

EP by Current 93
- Released: January 1984
- Recorded: 1982
- Length: 9:44
- Label: L.A.Y.L.A.H. AntirecordsLAY 01

Current 93 chronology
Mi-Mort (1983)	LAShTAL (1984)	No Hiding from the Blackbird (1984)

LAShTAL is the first EP solely by Current 93, after the previous split EP with Nurse with Wound. The EP features musicians Fritz Häaman and John Balance in addition to the primary Current 93 member David Tibet. "LAShTAL" and "Salt" were later released on the Current 93 compilation Nature Unveiled.

== Pressings ==
- First pressing (1984) with insert, purple on center label, limited to 2000 copies. Scratched messages (only on the first press): A Side: Maldoror Est Mort, B Side: Fang
- Second pressing (198?) with no insert, black on center label.
- Third pressing (1988) reissue with different center label and sleeve, no insert.

== Track listing ==
Side A

1. "LAShTAL": 4:06

Side B

1. "Salt": 3:47
2. "Caresse": 2:15

== See also ==
- Aleister Crowley
- Thelema
