= No Hiding from the Blackbird =

EP by Current 93 / Nurse with Wound
- Released: 1984
- Length: 10:25
- Label: L.A.Y.L.A.H. AntirecordsLAY 06

Current 93 / Nurse with Wound chronology
LAShTAL (1984)	No Hiding from the Blackbird (1984)	Nylon Coverin' Body Smotherin' (1984)

No Hiding from the Blackbird is the second split EP between Current 93 and Nurse with Wound, released in 1984. The full title is No Hiding from the Blackbird / The Burial of the Stoned Sardine. These tracks would later be included on the CD reissue of Nature Unveiled.

== Pressings ==
- First pressing (1984)
- Second pressing (1990)

== Track listing ==
1. "No Hiding from the Blackbird": 4:07
2. "The Burial of the Stoned Sardine": 6:18
