= Little Annie =

American singer, actress and artist

- Also known as: Annie Anxiety, Annie Bandez, Annie Anxiety Bandez, Little Annie
- Born: Anna Bandez
- Origin: New York City, U.S.
- Genres: Torch; dance; industrial; punk rock; electronic; reggae; experimental
- Occupations: Singer; painter; actress; poet; writer; performance artist
- Years active: 1977–present
- Labels: On-U Sound; Southern; One Little Indian; Durtro/Jnana; Tin Angel
- Website: littleanniebandez.com

Ann Robie Bandes (born c. 1961), better known as Little Annie, Annie Anxiety or Annie Anxiety Bandez, is an American singer, painter, poet, writer, performing and recording artist, and stage actor.

== Career ==
=== Early career: New York and London ===
Little Annie began singing at the age of 16 with her band 'Annie and the Asexuals', formed in 1977. Upon moving to the UK in 1981 at the invitation of Steve Ignorant, she began working with Penny Rimbaud and Crass. As Annie Anxiety, she performed poems onstage using a soundtrack of backing tapes at gigs across the UK with Crass and their extended family. She was also involved at the beginning of the band Rubella Ballet. With the assistance of Penny Rimbaud of Crass, she recorded and released her first 7" EP 'Barbed Wire Halo' on Crass Records in 1981.

She then went on to become the house chanteuse for Adrian Sherwood's On-U Sound Records, including the recording of three solo albums Soul Possession, Short and Sweet, and Jackamo. During this time she also recorded with The Wolfgang Press, Current 93, Coil, Nurse With Wound, Lee 'Scratch' Perry, Bim Sherman, CL Stealers, Swans, Kid Congo Powers, Fini Tribe, and wrote for the late Bim Sherman, Paul Oakenfold, Gary Clail, and Living Colour.

=== Return to America: Acting, painting, writing and performance ===
With the exception of recording and appearing with close friend Kid Congo Powers and New York duo Sister Boy, Annie started a hiatus from music in 1990. Being in her words 'driven insane by the hues' during a period of living in Mexico, the New Yorker returned home determined to teach herself painting, something which she had dabbled in previously, by devoting a full year of average 16-hour days. Employing every medium with the exception of oils, her work has been described as having a "naive style", which is "figurative, metaphorical and surrealistic, with a strong emphasis on color; often combining tortuous, expressionistic cityscapes with Biblical imagery". God and Science, was inspired by the September 11, 2001 terrorist attacks on the United States. She first exhibited as part of a group show curated by artist the late Louis Laurita, who provided her much encouragement and guidance. Annie had her first solo gallery show four years later in 2002.

She returned to recording in 1992 with the On-U Sound single "I Think of You", with the album Short and Sweet following in 1993, now recording under the name Little Annie.

Annie met the actor Bill Rice, and the two became close friends, appearing together many times in numerous plays and theater pieces, with Jim Neu's play Alone Together their last work together as Rice died a few months after the end of their run in January 2007.

Little Annie returned full-time to music with an EP, Lullaby, cowritten with Larry Tee, and "Diamonds" was produced by Joe Budenholzer and Christoph Heemann released in 2002 by Drag City. A new project, 'The Legally Jammin', a band formed with Christian Jendrieko, Khan Oral, and Kid Congo Powers. The 2003 album The Legally Jamming (Italic Records) was voted in Mojo as no. 1 Dance Album of the Year. Her next album to follow would be the first of her more piano /string section-based works; Songs from the Coalmine Canary, released on the Durtro/Jnana label, was co-produced by Antony Hegarty and Joe Budenholzer (of Backworld). Hegarty also played piano, sang backup vocals and co-wrote several songs on the album. The song "Strangelove", co-written by Little Annie and Hegarty, was used as the soundtrack for Levi's 'Dangerous Liaisons' advertising campaign in 2007, garnering several awards, including the Cannes Lions – International Advertising Festival, 2007 (Bronze Lion ) for "Best Use of Music".

Little Annie has performed on stage with Marc Almond, supporting him in 2007 in several appearances at Wilton's Music Hall, where she performed with pianist Paul Wallfisch of the band Botanica, and on Almond's '30 Years Of Hits' tour two years later.

In 2008, she and Paul Wallfisch recorded the album When Good Things Happen to Bad Pianos, which includes a cover of U2's song "I Still Haven't Found What I'm Looking For".

In 2010, Annie and Wallfisch released their second album, Genderful.

In 2011, Little Annie became the singer of the Italian band Larsen appearing on the albums La Fever Lit 2010 and Cool Cruel Mouth (Tin Angel).

In 2013, Little Annie and Baby Dee released State of Grace on Tin Angel Records, and toured together in North America and Europe.

In 2015, Annie had her first gallery show since 2007 at Gavin Brown Enterprises, curated by Boo-Hooray Gallery, the show called 'NYC/Miami' showcased her artwork done between 2013 and 2015, consisting of monochromatic tumbling cityscapes juxtaposed with vibrant mandalas reflecting her recent relocation to Miami. She and Wallfisch reunited to tour with Swans. Annie recorded Trace, her eighth solo album, in Toronto with Ryan Driver, Opal/Onyx, and Wallfisch, produced by Jean Martin and released in 2016.

In 2017, she guested on Hifi Sean's album FT on the track "Just Another Song", which she also wrote, and her first book of artwork, Meditations in Chaos, was published by Timeless Ed (Toulouse, France).

In 2020, she provided guest vocals on the song "Washed Our Name Tags Away" on Michael Cashmore's album "The Doctrine of Transformation Through Love".

=== Writing ===
Little Annie has consolidated and published her memoirs, poetry and lyrics. First her memoirs under the title: You Cant Sing The Blues While Drinking Milk, which were published in 2012 by Tin Angel Publishing and including forewords by Lydia Lunch, David J, Baby Dee, David Tibet, and Anohni Hegarty. Also released in 2013 were her most recent book of prose Sing Don't Cry /I Remember Mexico on Existencil Press in the UK. Preceding these was Stride Publications published: Hell is a place where we call each other darling: the poems and prose of Little Annie, a collection of her poems and song lyrics including "Bless Those" (Little Annie's Prayer) which Living Colour recorded.

== Discography ==
=== Albums ===
List of studio albums, with selected details
| Artist | Title | Album Details |
|---|---|---|
| Annie Anxiety | Soul Possession | Released: February 20, 1984; Label: Corpus Christi; Format: LP, CD, digital download |
| Annie Anxiety Bandez | Jackamo | Released: 1987; Label: One Little Indian; Format: LP, CD |
| Little Annie | Short and Sweet | Released: 1992; Label: On-U Sound; Format: LP, CD, digital download |
| Little Annie & the Legally Jammin' | Little Annie & The Legally Jammin' | Released: October 20, 2003; Label: Italic; Format: LP, CD, digital download |
| Little Annie | Songs from the Coal Mine Canary | Released: April 17, 2006; Label: Durtro/Jnana; Format: CD, digital download |
| Little Annie, Paul Wallfisch | When Good Things Happen to Bad Pianos | Released: February 12, 2008; Label: Durtro/Jnana; Format: CD |
| Little Annie, Paul Wallfisch | Genderful | Released: April 9, 2010; Label: Southern; Format: CD, digital download |
| Little Annie, Baby Dee | State of Grace | Released: November 19, 2012; Label: Tin Angel; Format: LP, CD, digital download |
| Little Annie | Trace | Released: May 20, 2016; Label: Tin Angel; Format: LP, CD, digital download |

with Larsen

- 2008 — Larsen — La Fever Lit (Important)
- 2011 — Larsen — Cool Cruel Mouth (Tin Angel)

=== Singles and EPs ===
- 1981 — Annie Anxiety – "Barbed Wire Halo" 7" (Crass Records, 321984/3) – UK Indie No. 10
- 1987 — Annie Anxiety Bandez - "As I Lie in Your Arms" 12" (One Little Indian, 12TP6)
- 1990 — Annie Anxiety Bandez -"Sugar Bowl" 7"/12" (Atco/East West)
- 1992 — Little Annie - "I Think of You" 12" (On-U Sound, ON-UDP 21)
- 1993 — Little Annie - "Bless those" 10" (On-U Sound, ON-U DP 26)
- 1994 — Little Annie - In Dread with Little Annie (Four Pieces of Heart at 33RPM) 12" (On-U Sound, ON-UDP30)
- 1994 — Little Annie – "Going for Gold" (On-U Sound)
- 2001 — Little Annie – "Diamonds Made of Glass" (Streamline)
- 2004 — Little Annie & The Legally Jammin' - Mixed Up Little Annie (Italic)
- 2011 — Little Annie & Fabrizio Modonese Palumbo – Blue Xmas EP (Tourette)

=== Compilation appearances ===
- "The Gates of Freedom" (Annie Anxiety and the Asexuals) on Here We Go (1985, Sterile)
- "It Was July" on F/Ear This! (1987), P.E.A.C.E.
- "I Think of You" (alternate vocal take, alternate mix) on Pay It All Back Volume Three (On-U Sound, ON-U LP53) (1991)
- "Hello Horror" on A Sides (Part One. 1979 / 1982) (1992), Crass
- "13 Things I Did Today" on Interiors (1998)
- "Baby I'll Make You a Man" on Brainwaves (2006)
- "Freddy & Me" on Not Alone (2006), Durtro/Jnana (compilation for Medicines Sans Frontier)
- "Small Love" on Songs Inspired By the Film 30th Century Man: Scott Walker by film maker Stephan Kijak (2010)

=== Guest appearances ===
- "Count This" on Keith LeBlanc's Stranger Than Fiction (1988), Nettwerk
- "Dans" on Kamarorghestar's Ríða Á Vaðið (1988), Gramm
- "The Birdie Song" and "Dreams & Light" on The Wolfgang Press's Queer (1991), 4AD
- "Things Happen" on Coil's Love's Secret Domain (1991), Wax Trax! Records
- "Gentle Killer" on Missing Brazilians' Warzone (1994), On-U Sound Records
- "Forty Six Things I Did Today" on CoH's Vox Tinnitus (1999), Raster-Noton
- "Ach Golgotha: The Mystical Body Of Christ In Chorazaim (excerpt)" on Current 93's Emblems: The Menstrual Years (2000), ArsNova
- Marc Almond "Hier Encore/Yesterday when I was young" (live duet) CD/DVD 2010
- "Interactive" on CL Stealers Feat; Little Annie (single)/JackPot Goalie album
- "I'm Curious Yellow" COH featuring Little Annie (2011) - single
- "Jack/Rabbit" PROTECTION featuring Little Annie - PROTECTION 10" EP (2014), Formlessness Press
- "Some Things We Do" (duet with Michael Gira) on Swans' To Be Kind (2014)
- "Washed our Name Tags Away" on Michael Cashmore's The Doctrine of Transformation Through Love II (2020)

== Publications ==
- Hell Is a Place Where We Call Each Other Darling: the Poems and Prose of Little Annie (1999), Stride Publications
- Sing Don't Cry: A Mexican Journal (August 1, 2012)
- You Can't Sing the Blues While Drinking Milk: The Autobiography of Little Annie AKA Annie "Anxiety" Bandez (November 26, 2012), Tin Angel Records, ISBN 9780957422704
- Just Like I Pictured It (2014), Exitstencil Press, UK
- Meditations In Chaos (2017), Timeless Ed, France
