= The Glass Bead Game (album) =

Studio album by James Blackshaw
- Released: May 26, 2009
- Recorded: November 2008
- Genre: Folk
- Length: 49:31
- Label: Young God Records

James Blackshaw chronology
Litany of Echoes (2008)	The Glass Bead Game (2009)	All Is Falling (2010)

Professional ratings
Aggregate scores
Source	Rating
Metacritic	82/100
Review scores
Source	Rating
AllMusic	4/5 stars
Cokemachineglow	79%
Fact	8/10
The Line of Best Fit	82%
Mojo	4/5 stars
Pitchfork	7.2/10
PopMatters	8/10
Spin	4.5/5 stars
Tiny Mix Tapes	4/5 stars
Uncut	4/5 stars

The Glass Bead Game is the seventh studio album by James Blackshaw. It was released in the United States on May 26, 2009.

== Track listing ==
1. "Cross" – 8:38
2. "Bled" – 10:25
3. "Fix" – 5:38
4. "Key" – 6:02
5. "Arc" – 18:48
