= To Kill a Mockingbird (disambiguation) =

To Kill a Mockingbird is a 1960 novel by American author Harper Lee.

To Kill a Mockingbird may also refer to:

- To Kill a Mockingbird (film), a 1962 adaptation of the novel
- To Kill a Mockingbird (2018 play), a 2018 Broadway play
