= Imperium (Current 93 album) =

Studio album by Current 93
- Released: 1987
- Recorded: 1987
- Genres: Industrial; avant-garde; neofolk; minimal; ambient
- Length: 52:48
- Labels: Maldoror; Durtro
- Producer: David Tibet

Imperium is a studio album released in 1987 by the English experimental group Current 93. It was made during a musical style shift between the earlier abrasive industrial sound of Current 93, and the more neofolk inspired approach that would characterize most of their subsequent output. It was originally released as an LP in 1987 on the Maldoror label, but in 1992 it was also released as a CD on David Tibet's Durtro label. Since then it has been reissued several times as both LP and CD on Durtro. The latest issue is from 2006, and is only for sale in Russia and CIS countries.

== Background and composition ==
Tracks in the first half of Imperium notably make use of slowed down and looped samples from Alan Stivell's Renaissance de la Harpe Celtique.

== Track listing ==
No.	Title	Length
1.	"Imperium I"	6:07
2.	"Imperium II"	5:47
3.	"Imperium III"	7:02
4.	"Imperium IV"	3:15
5.	"Time Stands Still (CD bonus track)"	2:57
6.	"Be"	0:53
7.	"Locust"	9:47
8.	"Or"	9:22
9.	"Alone"	7:36
Total length:		52:48

== Personnel ==
- David Tibet
