= Horii =

Horii (written: 堀井) is a Japanese surname. Notable people with the surname include:

- Christine Horii (born 1978), American singer better known as Rachel Factor
- Gakuya Horii (堀井 岳也; born 1975), Japanese footballer
- Iwao Horii (堀井 巌), politician
- Kosuke Horii (堀井 浩介; born 1994), Japanese sprinter
- Manabu Horii (堀井 学; born 1972), Japanese speed skater and politician
- Ryousuke Horii (堀井 亮佑, born 1982), Japanese video game designer and lyricist for Yakuza/Like A Dragon franchise
- Ryuji Horii (堀井 利有司; born 1974), Japanese swimmer
- Saori Horii (堀井 沙織; born 1984), Japanese gravure idol
- Tomitarō Horii (堀井 富太郎; 1890–1942), Japanese general
- Yoshiharu Horii (堀井 美晴; 1953–2025), Japanese football player and manager
- Yuji Horii (堀井 雄二; born 1954), Japanese video game designer
