= Baby Dee =

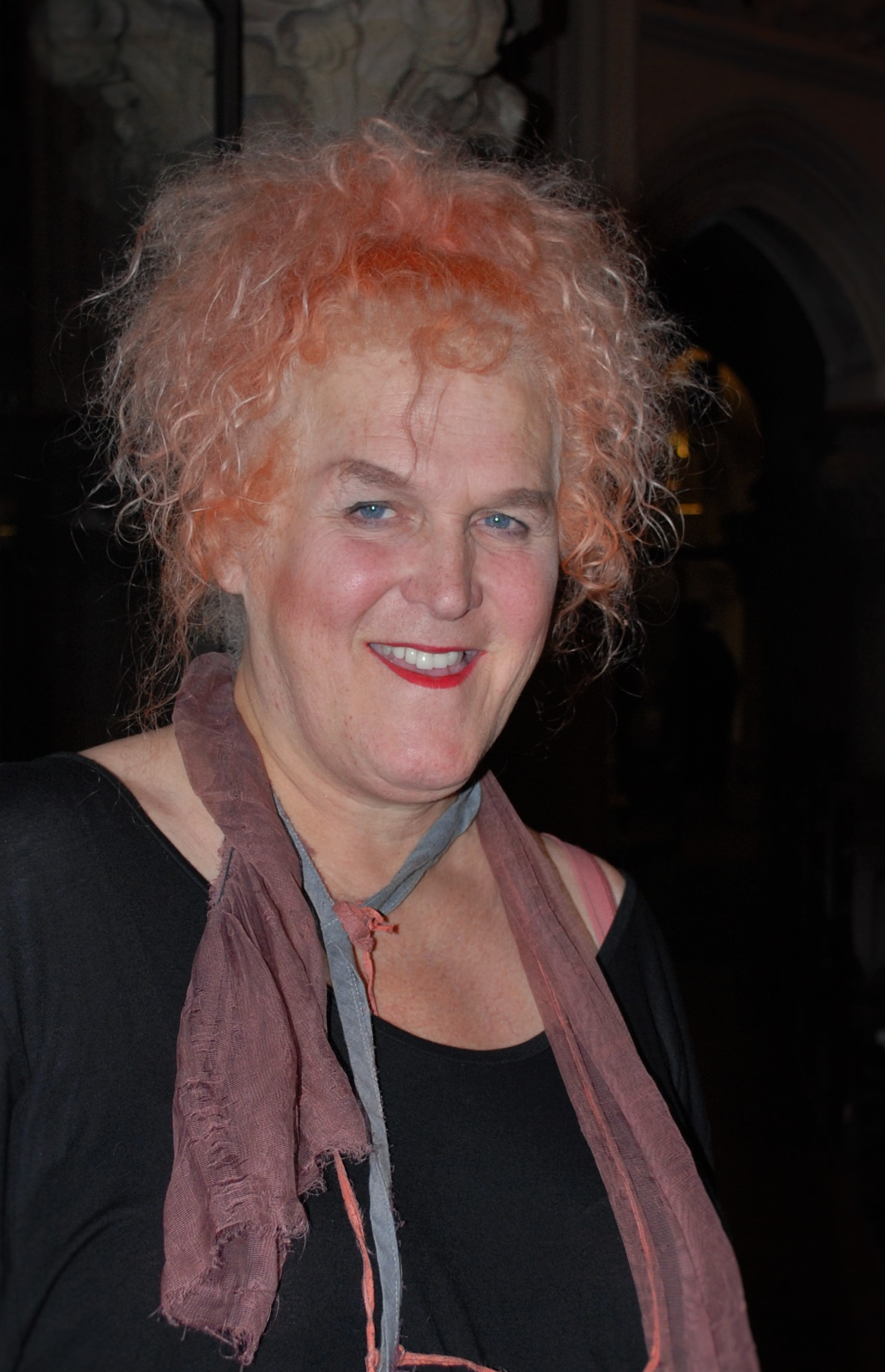
- Baby Dee in Berlin, 2016

Background information
- Born: 1953 (age 72–73); Cleveland, Ohio, U.S.
- Occupations: Singer-songwriter, musician, performance artist
- Instruments: Vocals, piano, organ, harp, accordion
- Years active: 1993-present
- Labels: World Serpent Distribution, Durtro, Drag City
- Website: www.babydee.org

Baby Dee (born 1953) is an American performance artist, multi-instrumentalist, and singer-songwriter from Cleveland, Ohio.

== Early career ==
In the 1970s, Baby Dee began her musical career as a street performer, but soon decided to take work as an organist at a Catholic church in the Bronx. Ten years later, after Dee had begun her transition into life as a woman, she left her job at the church and returned to her earlier occupation as a performance artist. She performed as an accordion-playing bilateral hermaphrodite in Coney Island, leading to a stint as the bandleader for the Bindlestiff Family Cirkus. She also became known for a street act in which she played harp while atop a high-rise tricycle in Manhattan.

In the 1990s, Baby Dee met fellow transgender musician and performance artist Anohni. The two became friends, and Hegarty later invited Dee to perform harp on her 1998 debut album, Antony and the Johnsons. During this time, Dee returned to her childhood home in Cleveland and took up work as a tree surgeon. Never having envisioned herself as a recording artist, Dee gave Hegarty songs she had written, in hopes that she would perform them. Hegarty, instead, sent them to her friend David Tibet, founder of the music group Current 93. Tibet contacted Dee, encouraging her to record an album for his label, Durtro.

== The Durtro Years: 2000–2006 ==
In 2001, Baby Dee released her debut album, Little Window. The album was composed and produced by Dee and featured only her, singing and playing piano on seven songs, bookended by two accordion instrumentals. Though the album went largely unnoticed at the time of its release, the few reviews it did receive were mostly positive.

Dee released her second album, Love's Small Song, in 2002. This album was recorded in much the same fashion as the first, with Dee acting as the sole producer, composer, and performer. This time, though, the album contained more varied instrumentation with layered tracks of vocals, piano, accordion, and harp. Dee even set the entire album against a recording of birdsong. Still, while the album received a few very positive reviews, it also garnered little attention.

In 2007, the out-of-print albums Little Window and Love's Small Song, along with Made for Love, a 2005 three-song EP, were re-released in a 2-CD compilation, The Robin's Tiny Throat.

== Drag City: 2007–present ==
By 2006, Baby Dee had grown tired of recording and returned to private life at her Cleveland home. Unfortunately, Dee's tree climbing career was cut short when a tree she was doctoring fell on a customer's home. The incident left Dee jobless and in need of money. Soon, though, Dee came into luck when she met musicians Will Oldham and Matt Sweeney, who were both fans of her work. They offered to produce an album for her, and while initially hesitant, Dee soon agreed.

In 2008, Dee released her third official studio album (and her Drag City debut), Safe Inside the Day. The album was her first to feature collaborators, including producers Oldham and Sweeney and fellow eccentric personality/singer-songwriter Andrew WK. The album garnered significantly more attention than its predecessors and was well-reviewed by most.

In 2010, Dee released her fourth album, A Book of Songs for Anne Marie, a re-recording of a limited-edition book and CD originally released by Durtro in 2004. The recording significantly expanded on the original version, adding chamber orchestration and three additional songs. The album also featured Dee, for the first time, predominantly using harp as opposed to piano. Following in the path of Safe Inside the Day, the album gained the artist further visibility and recognition. It was released on the Drag City label in America and on Tin Angel Records in the UK.

In 2011, Baby Dee released her fifth album, Regifted Light. The album was recorded in Dee's home and produced by friend and collaborator Andrew WK. It featured mainly instrumental tracks performed on a Steinway D grand piano with a small backing band.

In 2015, Baby Dee released her sixth album, I Am a Stick, on Tin Angel Records. "Working in what often sounds like a free-form style, the band's instrumentals punctuate Dee's piano arrangements, adding an element of unpredictability that's definitely more 'experimental' than anything she's done before".

A collaboration with the Zeelandic (Dutch) singer-songwriter Broeder Dieleman lead to a full album titled Oh mijn ziel (2023), including a translation of Dee's song Morning Fire.

== Collaborations ==
Baby Dee has worked with Anohni and the Johnsons, Andrew WK, and many other artists on the New York City scene. She has toured extensively with Current 93, playing piano and harp. She has also toured with Marc Almond and The Dresden Dolls. In 2010 she toured with Little Annie. In 2016 and 2017 she toured with Swans and later appeared on their 2019 album Leaving Meaning.

== Personal life ==
Baby Dee is a transgender woman. Her sister, Mary Norris, is a copy editor at The New Yorker.

== Discography ==
Albums

- Little Window (Durtro, 2001)
- Look What The Wind Blew In (Durtro, 2001)
- Love's Small Song (Durtro, 2002)
- A Book of Songs for Anne Marie (Durtro / Jnana, 2004)
- Safe Inside the Day (Drag City, 2008)
- A Book of Songs for Anne Marie (Re-Recorded) (Drag City / Tin Angel, 2010)
- Regifted Light (Drag City, 2011)
- I Am a Stick (Tin Angel, 2015)

EPs

- Baby Dee (Durtro, 2001)
- Made for Love (Durtro / Jnana, 2005)
- The Robins Song (Durtro / Jnana, 2008)

Compilations

- The Robin's Tiny Throat (Durtro / Jnana, 2007)

Live Albums

- Live in Turin (Precordings, 2006)
- Love Is Stronger Than Death / Baby Dee & John Contreras (Bragagild, 2008)
- Baby Dee Goes Down To Amsterdam (Tin Angel, 2011)

Singles

- "The Robin's Tiny Throat" – Little Window
- "Calvary" – Little Window
- "So Bad" – Love's Small Song
- "Dance of Diminishing Possibilities" – Safe Inside the Day
- "Safe Inside the Day" – Safe Inside the Day
- "As Morning Holds A Star" – A Book of Songs for Anne Marie
- "Regifted Light" – Regifted Light
