= David Jackman (musician) =

British musician and visual artist

- Also known as: Organum; Monoplane
- Genres: Drone; dark ambient; industrial
- Occupations: Musician, visual artist
- Years active: 1969–present

David Jackman is a British musician and visual artist known for his extensive catalogue of drone works, primarily as the principal and often sole member of the music project Organum.

Jackman began as a member of Cornelius Cardew's Scratch Orchestra where he was an active participant from 1969 to 1972. He highly valued his experience in the ensemble, writing in 1994: "I joined the orchestra in 1969 and soon found myself thrown into an energetic environment where to my surprise my musical ideas, however tentative, would be taken seriously and would actually get realised". In 1979, he started releasing limited-edition cassette singles, aligning with the underground cassette culture of the time. These early works were issued under his own name or the pseudonym Monoplane. It was not until 1983 that he adopted the moniker Organum, and began releasing music on vinyl through various European labels and his own imprint, Aeroplane. Characteristically, many of his releases are concise, featuring one sided 7" singles and EPs. In a 1995 interview with ND magazine (issue 20), he said, "I don't enjoy lengthy programmes. A 70 minute CD is similar to the old double album. And I never did like that".

He is also known for the distinctive artwork which adorns his releases, mostly surreal colourful collages, often meticulous in their detail. However, he has also released some recordings in deliberately spartan or even non-existent artwork - one CD release came in a clear jewel case with no paper parts or other packaging. The official website archives nearly all of this artwork.

Jackman continues to create new works, as well as reissuing earlier, long-unavailable titles.
