= James Blackshaw =

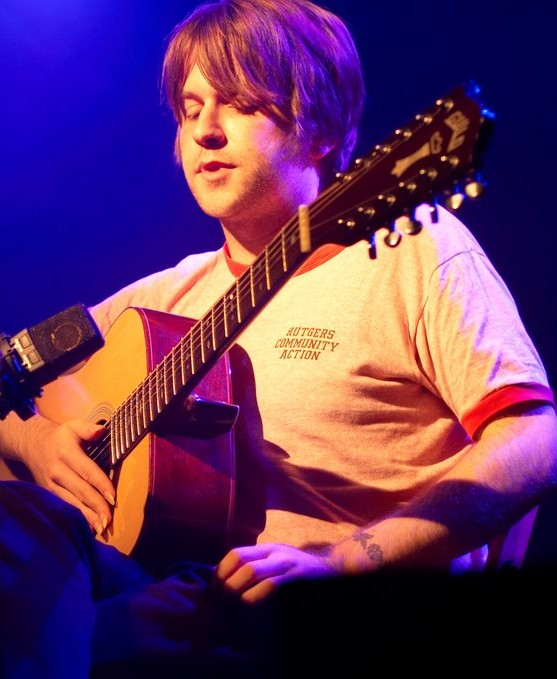
- Blackshaw performing at La Maroquinerie

Background information
- Born: 1981 (age 44–45); London
- Origin: London, England
- Genres: Folk
- Instruments: Guitar, piano
- Website: jamesblackshaw.tumblr.com

James Blackshaw (born 1981) is an English, Hastings-based folk fingerstyle guitarist and pianist. Blackshaw primarily plays an acoustic 12 string guitar and has been compared to Bert Jansch, Robbie Basho, John Fahey, Jack Rose, and Leo Kottke. He has released albums on the labels Celebrate Psi Phenomenon, Barl Fire Recordings, Static Caravan, Digitalis Industries, Important Records, Tompkins Square, and Young God Records.

In April 2016, he announced an indefinite hiatus from recording and performing music. His show in Hastings in August 2016 is his last one prior to hiatus. In July 2019, he announced his return to recording and performing.

== Discography ==
=== Albums ===
- Apologia CD (Self Released) 2003
- Celeste CD (Celebrate Psi Phenomenon) 2004, (Barl Fire Recordings) 2005 and (Tompkins Square) 2008
- Lost Prayers and Motionless Dances CD (Digitalis Industries) 2004 and (Tompkins Square) 2008
- Sunshrine CD (Digitalis Industries) 2005 and (Tompkins Square) 2008
- O True Believers LP (Bo'weavil Records) & CD (Important Records) 2006
- Waking Into Sleep - Goteburg 27.05.06 Live recording, CD (Kning Disk) 2006
- The Cloud of Unknowing CD/LP (Tompkins Square) 2007
- Litany of Echoes CD (Tompkins Square) 2008
- The Glass Bead Game CD (Young God Records) 2009
- All is Falling CD/LP (Young God Records) 2010
- Holly EP LP (Important Records) 2011
- Love is the Plan, the Plan is Death LP (Important Records) 2012
- Fantomas: Le Faux Magistrat OST CD/2LP (Tompkins Square) 2014
- Summoning Suns CD/LP (Important Records/P-Vine) 2015
- Unraveling In Your Hands (Self-released) 2024
- Fractures On The Horizon (Self-released) 2026

=== Compilations, collaborations, split releases and guest appearances ===
- Davenport Vs. James Blackshaw CD-R with Davenport (Static Records) 2005
- Gold Leaf Branches 3xCD (Digitalis Industries) 2005
- Sunshrine / Celeste LP (Bo'Weavil Recordings) 2005
- Imaginational Anthem Vol. 2 CD (Tompkins Square) 2006
- A Raga For Peter Walker CD (Tompkins Square) 2006
- The Garden of Forking Paths - a compilation CD curated and featuring music by James Blackshaw, Chieko Mori, Jozef van Wissem and Helena Espvall. Artwork by Hanna Tuulikki CD (Important Records) 2008
- Brethren of the Free Spirit (duo with Jozef van Wissem) - All Things Are From Him, Through Him and In Him CD/LP (audioMER) 2008
- Brethren of the Free Spirit - The Wolf Also Shall Dwell With The Lamb CD/LP (Important) 2009
- Current 93 - Aleph at Hallucinatory Mountain CD (Durtro/Jnana) 2009
- Sailors With Wax Wings - Sailors With Wax Wings CD 2010
- Myrninerest - “JHONN,” UTTERED BABYLON CD 2012
- The Watchers (with Lubomyr Melnyk) CD/LP (Important Records) 2013
