= Michael Cashmore =

English composer and musician

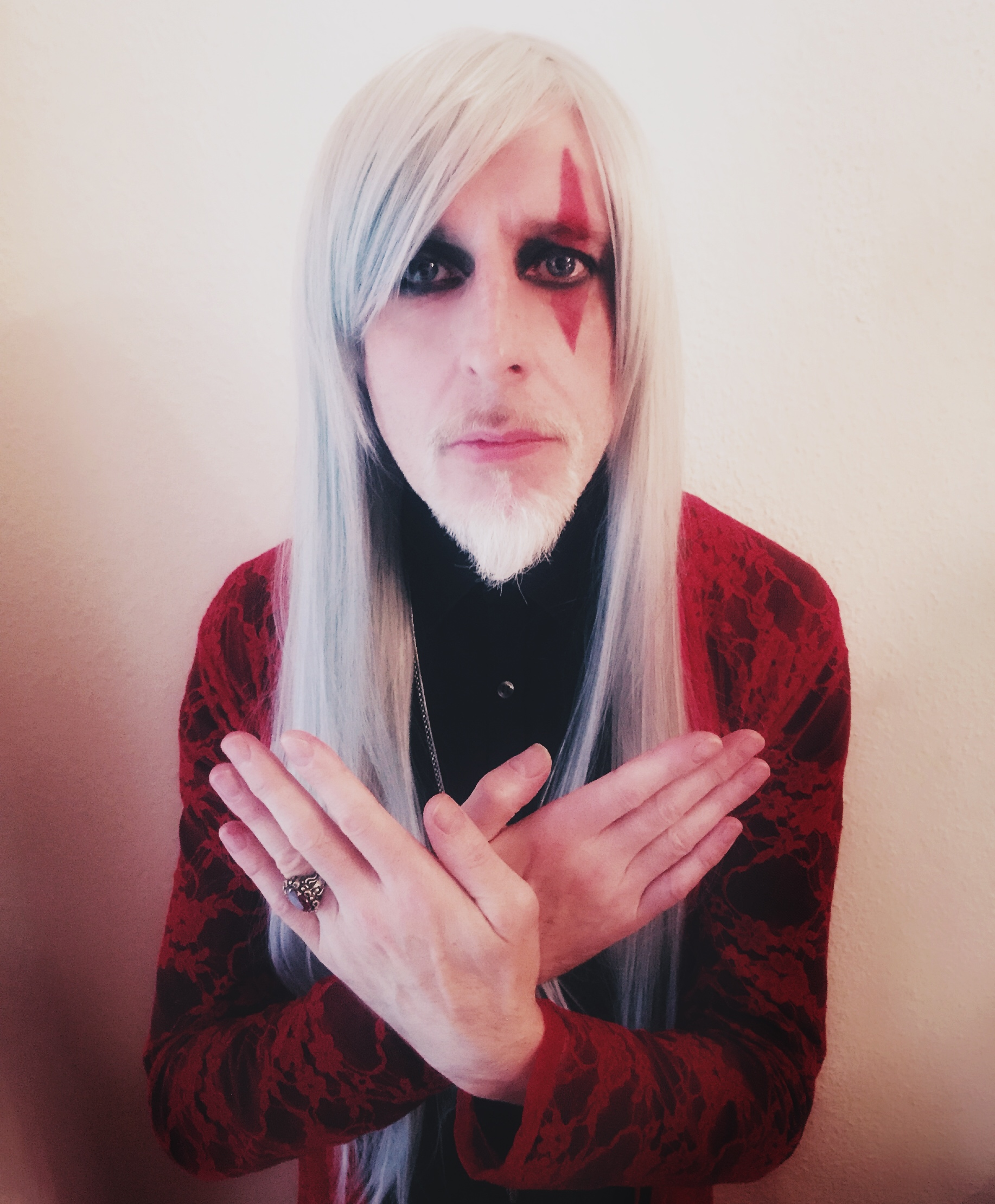
Michael Cashmore in 2017

Michael Cashmore is an English composer and musician currently living in Berlin. He has created music under the name of Nature and Organisation since the early 1980s and more recently (2006) under his own name.

Cashmore was initiated into The Temple Ov Psychick Youth in 1985 under the name Eden 99, a movement connected to the band Psychic TV and founded by Genesis P-Orridge.

Cashmore was a member of the group Current 93 from the late 1980s until around 2006. He composed the majority of the music for the group during that period. He has collaborated with many artists including David Tibet, Antony and the Johnsons, Bill Fay, Marc Almond, Nick Cave, Rose McDowall, Douglas P and Steven Stapleton.

After moving to Berlin in 2004 Cashmore broke several years of silence by releasing his first solo CD Sleep England in May 2006.

Early 2007 saw the release of The Snow Abides, a mini album containing a collection of songs that feature vocals by Antony Hegarty of Antony and the Johnsons.

In April 2008 Cashmore released a two-track EP with Marc Almond titled Gabriel and the Lunatic Lover which sets two poems "Gabriel" and "The Lunatic Lover" by Count Stenbock to music. Marc Almond appeared as a guest of Current 93 at the Queen Elizabeth Hall in London on 21 June 2008 and performed these songs with Cashmore on guitar. These two songs later appeared on a collaborative album by Marc Almond and Michael Cashmore in 2011 called Feasting With Panthers.

In 2017, Cashmore reissued published and unpublished works by the group Nature And Organisation on a double CD, and a series of four vinyl records, with the German label Trisol Music Group GmbH. In the same year, Cashmore released an electronic / experimental white vinyl EP under his own name with artist Shaltmira, to celebrate the 20th anniversary of the founding of the label.

Cashmore has publicly stated via social media that he is transforming himself, and his music is a reflection of this transformation. He released two albums on the Austrian label Klanggalerie, The Doctrine Of Transformation Through Love Parts I and II in 2019 and 2020, which are heavily electronic and experimental but also feature two songs recorded with Bill Fay and Little Annie.

Cashmore has also now formed a movement connected to his music called The Hidden Throne which he uses to share and promote his ideas of personal transformation.

In 2021 Cashmore announced the release of his new album "The Night Has Rushed In" on the English record label House of Mythology. The title track of the album features a text written by David Tibet of Current 93 and sang by Anohni.

In 2022 Cashmore wrote the musical score for the film "Stars" directed by Mars Roberge and based on the screenplay by Doron Braunshtein.The film is centered upon 5 homeless women living in New York who must learn that a glimmer of hope is worth more than all of the money in the World and its premiere was at the Winter Film Awards International Film Festival in New York on February 17, 2023.

2023 saw the release of Cashmore's first symphony "The Sword Becomes a Shield", a work composed of four movements and released digitally by House of Mythology, in the same year Cashmore had his first book published by Temporal Boundary Press. Entitled "Transformation Through Love - Poetry and Instinctive Mysticism as the Foundation of The Hidden Throne" it is a documentation of Cashmore's personal Transformation, it is a Theory and praxis of Instinctive Mysticism in the form of Poetic Symbolism, speculative Metaphysics and Biographical vignettes. It's a hard back book with dust jacket, page ribbon and comes with a CD album especially recorded by Cashmore for the book entitled "Awaking Into The Colour Wheel" and is limited to 434 hand-numbered copies.

In December 2024 Cashmore released the double vinyl album "The Snow Abides Completely" on Finnish record label Svart Records, this includes all of the tracks released on the original "The Snow Abides" EP including vocals by Anohni. "The Snow Abides Completely" also contains 5 previously unreleased Tracks featuring vocals by David Tibet (Current 93) and lyrics by Michael Cashmore, and Bill Fay sings his lyrical version of the Instrumental opening track "My Eyes Open". In the same month Cashmore also released a new album "Until The End Of Vibration" on CD on Lumberton Trading Company.

On social media Cashmore has stated that he has composed four Symphonies which he says are his most accomplished works to date, but due to difficulty in finding a suitable record label they may remain unreleased.

In June 2025 Cashmore announced on social media the re-issue of the Nature And Organisation album "Beauty Reaps the Blood of Solitude" by Svart Records (Finland) on vinyl, and the release of a new solo album "The Ninth Circle Beyond The Sun" on Lumberton Trading Company, CD release only.
