= Steven Stapleton =

British musician (born 1957)

Steven P. Stapleton
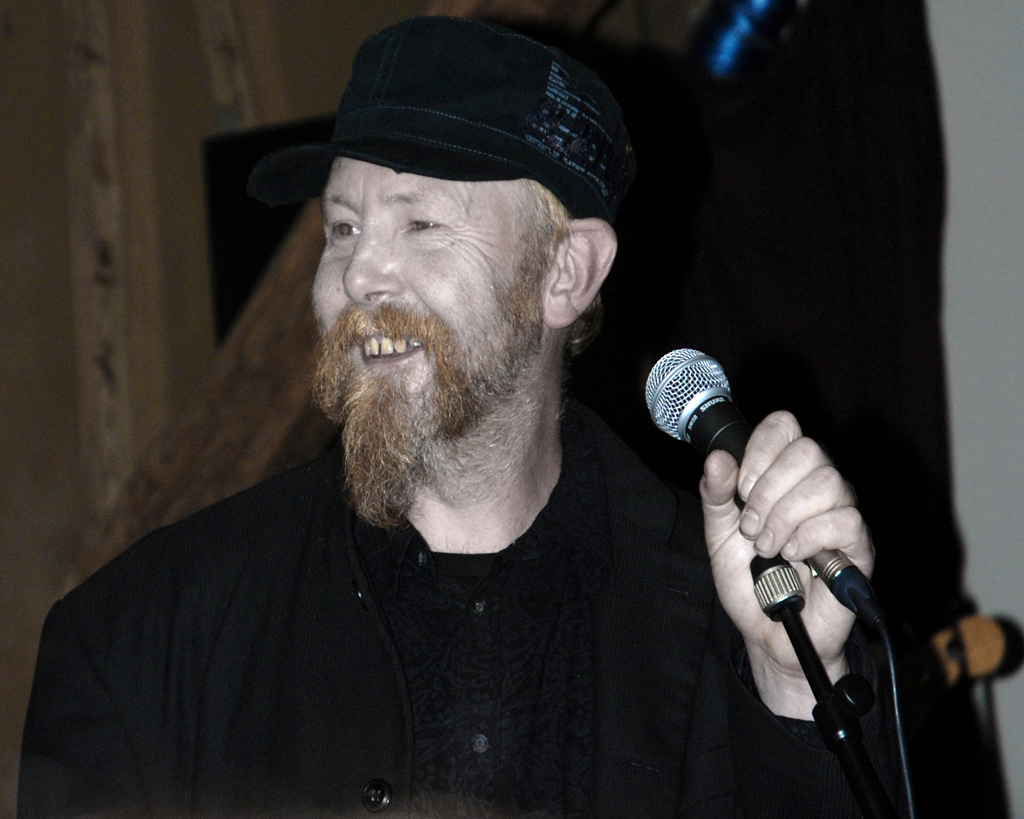
- Steven Stapleton live with Nurse with Wound at Avantgarde Festival 2008, Schiphorst

Background information
- Born: Steven Peter Stapleton; 3 February 1957 (age 69); Finchley, Middlesex, England
- Genres: Experimental; avant-garde; industrial; post-industrial; dark ambient; noise
- Years active: 1975–present

Steven Peter Stapleton (born 3 February 1957) is an English musician who is best known as the only constant member of experimental improv outfit Nurse with Wound. He is often seen as one of the pioneers of the British industrial music scene, alongside bands such as Throbbing Gristle, Monte Cazazza and Cabaret Voltaire, although in his music he has explored a wide range of styles, including free-form improvisation, folk, and even Latin American dance rhythms.

Nurse with Wound, originally a three-piece ensemble, is Stapleton's main outlet for his musical work, occasionally in collaboration with other musicians such as Foetus or William Bennett (of Whitehouse). He has also appeared on records by other artists and worked as a producer. He runs the United Dairies record label, which apart from the NWW output released records by Current 93, the Lemon Kittens and Volcano the Bear, as well as krautrock and several experimental artists. Stapleton is also a graphic artist and painter, and has designed album sleeves and book covers.

Under the name "Babs Santini", Stapleton has created the artwork for most of the Nurse with Wound recordings, as well as for other artists, such as Coil, the Legendary Pink Dots and Current 93. He has exhibited the originals of his works widely, the last show being held at GalleryX in Dublin.

Stapleton lives with his long-term partner and wife Sarah Redpath. The family live in the townland of Cooloorta in The Burren, Ireland, on a piece of land with houses and caravans hand-built and decorated by Stapleton. Stapleton is a fan of the Third Ear Band.

== Discography ==
(Solo recordings only. Follow link for Nurse with Wound recordings.)

- 1991: The Sadness of Things (with David Tibet)
- 1992: Revenge of the Selfish Shellfish (with Tony Wakeford)
- 1993: The Apocalyptic Folk in the Nodding God Unveiled (with The Nodding Folk)
- 1996: Musical Pumpkin Cottage (with David Tibet)
- 1998: Octopus (with David Tibet, a collection of older recordings)
