= David Tibet =

British artist and musician (born 1960)

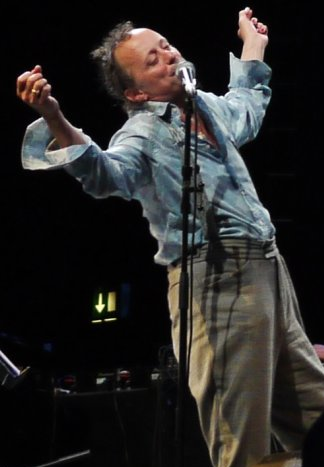
- David Tibet performing with Current 93 in 2010

Background information
- Born: David Michael Bunting; 5 March 1960 (age 66); Batu Gajah, Malaysia
- Origin: England
- Genres: Neofolk; psychedelic folk; noise; post-industrial
- Occupations: Musician; poet; songwriter
- Labels: Durtro; Jnana; Coptic Cat
- Member of: Current 93; Nodding God; Hypnopazūzu; Myrninerest
- Formerly of: Death in June; Nurse with Wound; Psychic TV; The Nodding Folk
- Website: Davidtibet.com

David Tibet (born David Michael Bunting; 5 March 1960) is an English musician, poet and songwriter. He is best known as the founder and sole constant member of the neofolk group Current 93, as well as for his contributions to the band Death in June.

== Biography ==
David Bunting was born to British parents in Batu Gajah, Perak, Malaysia. His father had fought in World War II and was among the soldiers who liberated the Bergen-Belsen concentration camp. He lived in Malaysia until 1970, when he was sent to England to attend the (at the time all-boys) Red House Preparatory School, an experience he has spoken poorly of. He attended Newcastle University.

He was given the name "Tibet" by Genesis P-Orridge while working with Psychic TV in the early '80s. In January 2005 he announced that he would revert to the name David Michael, although he continues to use the well-known "Tibet" in his public career to date.

== Music ==
After leaving university, he worked with Psychic TV and 23 Skidoo. He is credited on the Psychic TV albums Force the Hand of Chance and Dreams Less Sweet. Tibet left Psychic TV in 1983 and founded Current 93, of which he is the only constant member. Current 93's initial recordings consisted largely of harsh, repetitive industrial noise and dark ambient soundscapes. In the mid-1980s, Tibet was a resident of Freya Aswynn's communal house in London with Psychic TV alumni and associates of the emerging neo-folk scene; around that time, folk elements became prominent in Current 93's music.

Tibet has had a reciprocal relationship with other musicians and groups. Steven Stapleton of Nurse With Wound appeared on nearly every Current 93 release until 2010, while Tibet has appeared on many Nurse With Wound releases and collaborations with Stapleton. Death in June members Douglas P. and Tony Wakeford appeared on Current 93 releases from 1987 until 1993, while Tibet was a member of Death in June from the mid-'80s to 1995. Many other mutual collaborators, such as Jhonn Balance of Coil, were also part of the community surrounding Psychic TV.

== Visual arts ==
Tibet is an established visual artist with much of his work in well-known galleries such as the Henry Boxer Gallery and Isis Gallery. His exhibitions include:

- Isis Gallery, London (2008)
- Den Frie Centre Of Contemporary Art, Copenhagen (2009)
- "Magog at the Maypole (Sex of Stars)", White Columns, NYC (2012)
- "Invocation of Almost", California State University, Fullerton (2019)

== Publishing ==
Tibet has created a series of record labels and small publishing houses under the names Maldoror (referring to Les Chants de Maldoror), Durtro (from the Tibetan word for charnel ground), Jnana Records, Coptic Cat, The Spheres, Ghost Story Press, and Cashen's Gap (named for the home of Gef). These businesses publish and release his own work, as well as the work of artists he has collaborated with or has an interest in. The first album by Antony And The Johnsons was released by Durtro. Together with Mark Logan, he curated the 2006 five-CD compilation Not Alone to raise funds for Médecins Sans Frontières.

Tibet's 'The Moons At Your Door,' an anthology of 'strange tales that influenced' Tibet illustrated by his own artwork, was released in Paperback Edition in March 2016. He also was the editor of a follow-up anthology of supernatural short stories, titled "There is a Graveyard that Dwells in Man" published in 2020.

=== Musicians ===
- Arthur Doyle
- Bill Fay
- Charlemagne Palestine
- Chris Connelly
- Comus
- Little Annie
- Magick Lantern Cycle
- Marc Almond
- Othon Mataragas
- Paul Wallfisch
- Sand
- Sebastian Horsley
- Sharron Kraus
- Shirley and Dolly Collins
- Simon Finn
- Sveinbjörn Beinteinsson
- Tiny Tim
- Xhol Caravan
- Rudimentary Peni
- William Basinski

=== Writers ===
Most writers below are authors of supernatural and horror fiction.

- Arthur Gray
- Count Stenbock
- H. D. Everett
- Hesketh Hesketh-Prichard
- June-Alison Gibbons
- M. R. James
- Madge Gill
- Nick Blinko
- Robert Aickman
- Ron Weighell
- Thomas Ligotti
- Vincent O'Sullivan

== Personal life ==
David was married to the musician and artist Andria Degens, known as "Pantaleimon", who contributed to Current 93 albums between 1996 and 2009. They divorced around 2010. He lives in Hastings with his partner Ania Goszczyńska, an illustrator.

Around 2000, he suffered a near-fatal case of appendicitis.

In 2009, he completed a MA degree in Coptic Language and Grammar through Macquarie University. The Division of Rare and Manuscript Collections at the Cornell University Library holds his archives through 2013.

=== Religion and magic ===
Tibet was first exposed to Hinduism, Buddhism, and Taoism in Malaysia. He also showed an interest in esoteric Christianity from an early age, and still identifies as a Christian.

Tibet's mysticism is derived from such varied fields as religion, philosophy, witchcraft, poetry and painting. As his stage name suggests, he has Vajrayana Buddhist leanings, and regards the legendary tantric figure Padmasambhava as his own tutor. His album Buddhist Monks of the Maitri Vihar Monastery (1997) reflects his interest in Tibetan Buddhism. He also has longstanding interests in Christian mysticism and esoteric Christianity, especially Christian eschatology, and his lyrical subject matter reflects a consistent preoccupation with such apocalyptic imagery as death, loss, and destruction. Other influences include Gnosticism, Austin Osman Spare, and a variety of occult topics.

His interest in Aleister Crowley and Thelema began at age 11 when he purchased The Diary of a Drug Fiend at Sultan Abdul Aziz Shah Airport in Kuala Lumpur. Thelemic concepts appear aspects of the covers, lyrics and themes of Current 93 (including the group's name itself). The initial recording of Current 93, LAShTAL, was, according to Tibet, "the invocation of Malkunofath on the Nightside of Eden, the reverse of the Tree of Life". Despite his continuing appreciation for Crowley as an individual, Tibet has since distanced himself from Crowleyanity. In April 2006, Ordo Templi Orientis formed the International OTO Cabinet, an advisory, non-voting panel made up of both OTO Initiates and Non-Initiates. Tibet was named among the initial non-member appointments.

Although collaborators such as Douglas P. and Boyd Rice have alleged neo-Nazi connections, Tibet himself has referred to Hitler as the antichrist and dedicated the Current 93 song "Hitler as Kalki" to "my father who fought Hitler".

== Discography ==
=== As David ===
- Ferelith (2020)
- Fontelautus (2020)

=== With Myrninerest ===
- "Jhonn," Uttered Babylon (2012) (with James Blackshaw)
- Journey To Avebury (2012) (with James Blackshaw, Michael Cashmore, and Andrew Liles)

=== With others ===
- The Nodding Folk – The Apocalyptic Folk in The Nodding God Unveiled (1993). This album was accompanied by a comic book of Tibet's making.
- Aethenor – Anthracite (2008)
- Aethenor – Faking Gold and Murder (2008)
- Skitliv – Skandinavisk misantropi (2009) (vocals)
- Andrew Liles – "Love Will Tear Us Apart", on The Post Romantic Empire Album (2012) (vocals, with Annabella Lwin)
- Hypnopazūzu (David Tibet & Youth) – Create Christ, Sailor Boy (2016)
- Zu93 (David Tibet & Zu) – Mirror Emperor (2017)
- These New Puritans – Inside the Rose (2019) (vocals)
- Nodding God – Play Wooden Child (2019) (vocals in Akkadian, with Andrew Liles and 'Underage Shaitan Boy').

== Bibliography ==
- Tibet, David (2008). Faber, Michael; Wodlicka, Tod (eds.). Some Gnostic Cartoons. Isis Editions (London). ISBN 978-0-9558774-2-1.
- Tibet, David (2014). Sing Omega: Collected Writings and Lyrics from 2013—1983. The Spheres.
- Tibet, David (2014). "A Magical Request for Revelation (P. Stras. Inv. Kopt. 550)". In Boud'hors, Anne; Delattre, Alain; Louis, Catherine; Richter, Tonio Sebastian (eds.). Coptica argentoratensia: textes et documents de la troisième université d'été de papyrologie copte (Strasbourg, 18-25 juillet 2010). Cahiers de la Bibliothèque copte. Vol. 19. Paris: De Boccard. ISBN 978-2-7018-0372-2. ISSN 1968-3553.

=== Editor ===
- Stenbock, Eric Stanislaus (2001). Tibet, David (ed.). The Collected Poems of Count Stenbock. Durtro Press.
- Gill, Madge (2013). Tibet, David; Boxer, Henry (eds.). Myrninerest. The Spheres.
- Tibet, David, ed. (25 September 2016). The Moons at Your Door: An Anthology of Hallucinatory Tales. National Geographic Books. ISBN 978-1-907222-42-9.
- Stenbock, Eric Stanislaus (23 June 2020). Of Kings and Things. MIT Press. ISBN 978-1-913689-07-0.
- Tibet, David, ed. (8 September 2020). There Is a Graveyard That Dwells in Man: More Strange Fiction and Hallucinatory Tales. MIT Press. ISBN 978-1-913689-17-9.
- Gibbons, June-Alison (30 May 2023). The Pepsi Cola Addict. MIT Press. ISBN 978-1-913689-72-8.
