= David Fenech =

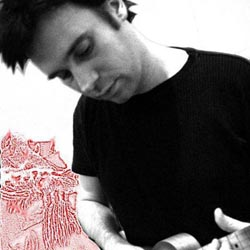

Background information
- Also known as: David F
- Born: David Fenech Saint Genieys; 19 July 1969 (age 56); Saint-Cloud, Hauts-de-Seine, France
- Genres: Free jazz Improvised; Electronic music Musique concrète
- Occupation: Composer
- Instrument: Electric guitar
- Years active: 1993–present
- Labels: Blackest Ever Black, Marionette, Sub Rosa, Akuphone, Brocoli, Klang Galerie, Gagarin, inPolysons
- Website: davidfenech.fr

David Fenech (born 19 July 1969) is a French composer, guitarist and singer. His style has been described as 'a kind of punk musique concrète'. He uses the studio as an instrument, using a large panel of recording techniques. He has played and recorded with musicians such as Nurse With Wound, Felix Kubin, Jad Fair, Tom Cora, Rhys Chatham, Pascal Comelade, Jac Berrocal, Ghédalia Tazartès, James Plotkin, Shugo Tokumaru, Ergo Phizmiz, Pierre Bastien, and many others.

== Biography ==
David Fenech received a guitar for his tenth birthday and never ceased making music since then. Between 1990 and 1995, he was very active on the mail art network and published tracks on various tape and CD compilations. In 1991, he led the Peu Importe collective in Grenoble. This band played improvised music and punk rock in a spirit close to bands like The Ex or Pere Ubu.

David Fenech released his debut solo CD in 2000 on the Tout L'Univers label (reissued by Felix Kubin on Gagarin Records), and then a duet with Moka. His second album called Polochon Battle was released by inPolysons, a French label.

He also plays improvisation on electric guitar with musicians such as Gino Robair, Tom Cora, Jac Berrocal, Andrea Parkins and has also played duets with musicians like Felix Kubin, Jad Fair, Ergo Phizmiz, Klimperei, James Plotkin, Shugo Tokumaru, Ghédalia Tazartès, etc. He has also worked as a software developer at IRCAM and more recently at L-Acoustics.

He has run a micro-label Demosaurus that has published 2 cds (Ghédalia Tazartès and Frank Pahl).

In 2009, he began working with Jac Berrocal. This collaboration resulted in a record as a trio with Ghédalia Tazartès (Superdisque, on Sub Rosa) and more recently trios with Jac Berrocal + Vincent Epplay (5 albums) or with Jac Berrocal + Jason Willett (Christmas in March - Megaphone / Knock Em Dead)

== Selected discography ==
=== Solo ===
- 2024 Mountains Of Night – LP, Jelodanti
- 2007 Polochon Battle – CD, Inpolysons
- 2000 Grand Huit – CD, Tout L'Univers / LP, Gagarin Records

=== With Pierre Bastien ===
- 2022, Suspicious Moon, CD, LP, Improved Sequence

=== With Jac Berrocal and Ghédalia Tazartès ===
- 2011, Superdisque, CD, LP, Sub Rosa

=== With Jac Berrocal and Vincent Epplay ===
- 2024, Broken Allures, LP, CD, Cold Spring - with Cosey Fanni Tutti and Jah Wobble
- 2022, Zilveli Villa, Single, AcoustiArc
- 2022, Transcodex, LP, Akuphone - CD, KlangGalerie
- 2020, Exterior Lux, LP, Akuphone - CD, KlangGalerie
- 2019, Ice Exposure, LP, Blackest Ever Black - CD, KlangGalerie
- 2017, Why, Single, Blackest Ever Black
- 2015, Antigravity, CD, LP, Blackest Ever Black

=== With Jac Berrocal and Jason Willett ===
- 2020, Xmas in March, LP, Megaphone + Knock Em Dead Records

=== With Laurent Perrier ===
- 2020 Plateforme #3 – LP, Bam Balam records

=== With Klimperei ===
- 2021 Rainbow de Nuit – LP, Marionette records

=== With Moka ===
- 2000 Les vaches – vinyl, Romulus Et Remus

=== With Peu Importe ===
- 1996 Discotroma 1 – CD, Le Dernier Cri
- 1996 Discotroma 2 – CD, Le Dernier Cri

=== Compilations ===
- 2020 With Love, Jelodanti - Double LP, Jelodanti (with Arrington de Dionyso, The Work, Palo Alto)
- 2012 Veterans of the French Underground Meet la Jeune-Garde - CD, Musea (with Daevid Allen, Pierre Bastien, ERikm, Pascal Comelade, Richard Pinhas).
- 2010 Chansons jamais entendues à la radio - CD, Musea (with Albert Marcoeur, Joseph Racaille).
- 2009 Assemblage de Pièces Comeladiennes du plus bel effet - CD, Musea (with Faust, Pierre Bastien, Richard Pinhas).
- 2008 Documents – CD, Trace (with Pierre-Yves Macé, Jean-François Pauvros, Hervé Zénouda).
- 2007 Cagesan – CD, Beau Brun (with Felix Kubin, Momus, toog, montag, digiki, o.lamm, james harvey).
- 2006 Next to Nothing – CD, Optical Sound (with Scanner, Simon Fisher Turner).
- 2006 Tribute to Moondog – CD, Trace Label (with Joseph Racaille, Jean-Jacques Birgé)
- 2001 La Musique du Jouet – CD, Novel Cell Poem (with Pascal Comelade, Dragibus, Harpy, Klimperei, Frank Pahl)
- 1999 Strings and Stings – CD, FBWL (with Thurston Moore, Noel Akchote, Loren Mazzacane Connors)
