= Homotopy to Marie =

Studio album by Nurse with Wound
- Released: 1982
- Recorded: 1981–82
- Genre: Industrial; musique concrète; sound collage
- Length: 65:30
- Label: United Dairies
- Producer: Steven Stapleton

Nurse with Wound chronology
| Insect and Individual Silenced (1981) | Homotopy to Marie (1982) | Brained by Falling Masonry (1983) |

Professional ratings
Review scores
| Source | Rating |
|---|---|
| AllMusic | 3.5/5 stars |
| Pitchfork | 8.5/10 |

Homotopy to Marie is the fifth album by Nurse with Wound, released in 1982.

Although Nurse with Wound had generated considerable interest across their preceding releases, Steven Stapleton has asserted to author David Keenan that Homotopy to Marie should be considered the first "real" NWW album. In Keenan's book England's Hidden Reverse, Stapleton states that this was the first album he made without intervention, the original trio line-up having dispersed in 1980. Although J. G. Thirlwell participated in some of the sessions and is thanked on the album's sleeve, this is effectively a Steven Stapleton solo album and he would retain sole curatorship of NWW from this point onwards.

The album was the result of a block booking made by Stapleton at IPS Studios in London, reserving every Friday evening (6pm - midnight) for a whole year. It is, as Keenan notes, audibly less musically conventional than its predecessors and relies on Stapleton's improving abilities of tape-editing and construction, honed during these Friday evening sessions. The Audion Guide To Nurse With Wound states that the album is "a step on from the Dadaist rock of Merzbild Schwet, with much use of tape manipulation and classical avant-garde techniques" with Allmusic using keywords including unsettling, volatile, eerie and nocturnal to describe the feel of the album which combined tape edits with resonating gong tones and disembodied children's voices to create a sonic collage far removed from the harsh improvisations of the group's early albums. The sleeve credits include a declaration that the record was inspired by Franz Kamin.

The title of the brief closing track derives from a passage from Les Chants de Maldoror, a surreal poetic novel written by the French-Uruguayan author Isidore-Lucien Ducasse, under the pseudonym Comte de Lautréamont. This appropriation of a phrase from Maldoror is shared in common with the title of Nurse with Wound's debut album Chance Meeting on a Dissecting Table of a Sewing Machine and an Umbrella; both phrases appear in Lautréamont's work.

When a boarder at school is controlled for years which seem like centuries, from morning to evening and from evening to morning again by a pariah of civilization whose eyes are constantly fixed on him, he feels the tumultuous upsurge of lasting hatred rising like thick smoke to his brain, which seems about to burst.

— Comte de Lautréamont, The Songs of Maldoror, Canto I, Verse 12.

The album was issued on Stapleton's own United Dairies label in an initial pressing of 5,000, five times as many as predecessor Insect and Individual Silenced. It was also issued on cassette. A compact disc edition was released in 1992 with alternate artwork (pictured) and an additional contemporaneous recording, "Astral Dustbin Dirge", which had been omitted from the original formats for reasons of length. All copies of the CD suffered from a mastering fault which caused the index point between tracks 2 and 3 to occur 3 minutes earlier than it should. The titles of most of the tracks were also abbreviated on this edition. The album went out of print when distributor World Serpent went out of business but was reissued on United Dairies in June 2007 in remastered form, with the correct index points and the original track titles restored. In 2018, it was reissued by Rotorelief as three different 2LP editions and a 2CD set packaged in a hardcover 26-page art book, plus a special edition of 25 copies of the original LP, each in its own unique sleeve, with an insert signed by Stapleton.

The laughter heard on "The Tumultuous Upsurge (Of Lasting Hatred)" is sampled from the King Crimson song "Easy Money" from the album Larks' Tongues in Aspic.

Pitchfork Media ranked it #61 on their list of 'Top 100 Albums of The 80s'. In 2022, Treble ranked it at number 144 in their list of "The 150 Best Albums of the 1980s"; in the accompanying essay, Jeff Terich wrote that "Homotopy to Marie is a masterpiece of disorienting sound collage, the sounds of crunched bits of metal and marching soldiers, sacred vocal music and inquisitive children, blood-curdling moans and screams and ambient drones."

== Track listing ==
=== Side one ===
1. "I Cannot Feel You as the Dogs Are Laughing and I Am Blind" – 10:14
2. "Homotopy to Marie" – 16:37

=== Side two ===
1. "The Schmürz (Unsullied by Suckling)" – 24:54
2. "The Tumultuous Upsurge (Of Lasting Hatred)" – 1:25

=== CD edition ===
1. "I Cannot Feel You as the Dogs Are Laughing and I Am Blind" – 10:14
2. "Homotopy to Marie" – 16:37
3. "Astral Dustbin Dirge" – 12:19
4. "The Schmürz (Unsullied by Suckling)" – 24:54
5. "The Tumultuous Upsurge (Of Lasting Hatred)" – 1:25

As mentioned above, early CD pressings had the final three minutes of "Homotopy to Marie" as part of "Astral Dustbin Durge", leaving track times of 13:37 and 15:19, respectively. The 2007 reissue corrected this indexing error.

=== Rotorelief 2LP/2CD ===
The first LP/CD is the original album. The second LP/CD contains:

1. "Astral Dustbin Dirge" – 12:19
2. "Stick That Chick & Feel My Steel Through Your Last Meal" – 7:00
3. "I Was No Longer His Dominant" – 9:12
4. "Ciconia" – 10:30

1 is from Drunk with the Old Man of the Mountains; 2–4 are remixed versions of compilation tracks as released on the NWW album Automating Volume One.

== Sources ==
- Bowe, Miles (2018). "Nurse With Wound: Homotopy to Marie". Pitchfork.
