= Parrenin =

Parrenin is a surname. Notable people with the surname include:

- Dominique Parrenin (1665-1741), French Jesuit missionary to China
- Emmanuelle Parrenin, French singer and instrumentalist
- Joseph Parrenin (born 1941), French politician

== Other ==
- Parrenin Quartet
