= Specimens (musician) =

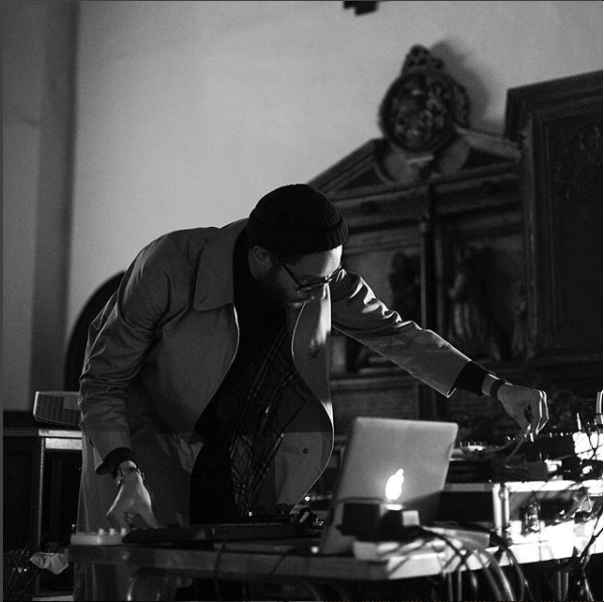
- Specimens in 2017

Background information
- Birth name: Alex Ives
- Also known as: Specimens
- Born: 7 July 1989 (age 35); Doncaster, South Yorkshire, England
- Origin: London, England
- Genres: Ambient; Experimental; Drone; Electronic
- Years active: 2012–present
- Labels: First Terrace Records; SVS Records; A Giant Fern; Shimmering Moods Records
- Website: specimensmusic.co.uk

Alex Ives (born 7 July 1989), known by his stage name Specimens, is an electronic, experimental, ambient & drone musician of British/Jamaican descent based in London UK.

== Solo work as Specimens ==
Starting out as a bedroom project in 2012, Ives officially released his first solo work under the name Specimens in 2015 with a Compact Cassette release on Shimmering Moods Records. He subsequently went on to release a number of cassettes on labels such as A Giant Fern & Tenderly Surrender ahead of his debut album 'Sculptures' in 2016. Also in 2016 Ives launched his own label First Terrace Records which has gone on to release artists such as Peter Broderick (Beacon Sound Choir), Chihei Hatakeyama, Anna Homler, Pierre Bastien & Machinefabriek.

== Early music career ==
Ives started out as a guitarist and drummer in garage rock and punk bands, most notably as a former member of Thee MVPs. In this band he toured extensively around Europe and America supporting artists such as Frank Carter & The Rattlesnakes, Pulled Apart by Horses, Temples, Twin Peaks, Ty Segall, Night Beats & Television. During this period he had releases on labels such as Burger Records, Greenway Records, Slovenly Recordings, Easy Action, Batchelor Records & more. He is also a founding member & drummer in the band Ice Baths which released their debut album in 2018 on the London-based label Blank Editions (Thurston Moore, Douglas Hart, Housewives).

== Selected solo discography ==
- 2015 – II (Shimmering Moods Records) (Cassette)
- 2015 – Water & Concrete (Tenderly Surrender) (Cassette)
- 2016 – J C / Specimens (A Giant Fern) (Cassette)
- 2017 – Sculptures (First Terrace Records) (LP)
- 2018 – In The Dust of Idols (SVS Records) (LP)
- 2019 – Specimens / Inchindown (Display) (Cassette)
- 2019 – MIND-DRONE Vol. 7 (Drone Records) (LP Compilation)
- 2020 – Café Songs (First Terrace Records) (Cassette)
- 2020 – @0 (Ahead Of Our Time) (CD Compilation)
- 2022 – Intersections (First Terrace Records) (LP)
- 2023 - Power Pain Privilege (First Terrace Records) (LP)
- 2023 - To Light a Candle is to Cast a Shadow (Cluster Node) (Cassette Compilation)
