= Specimen =

Specimen may refer to:

== Science and technology ==
- Sample (material), a limited quantity of something which is intended to be similar to and represent a larger amount
- Biological specimen or biospecimen, an organic specimen held by a biorepository for research
- Laboratory specimen, a biological specimen taken by sampling
- Zoological specimen, an animal or part of an animal preserved for scientific use
- Botanical specimen, a plant or part of a plant used for scientific purposes
- Herbarium, a collection of preserved plant specimens for scientific study
- Type specimen (mineralogy), a reference sample by which a mineral is defined

== Printing ==
- Specimen banknote, to aid in the recognition of banknotes
- Specimen stamp, used to identify valid stamps

== Other uses ==
- Specimen (band), a British band
- Specimens (musician)
- Specimen (film), a 1996 Canadian film
- Specimen Products, an American audio equipment and musical instrument manufacturer
- Specimen Ridge, a ridge in Yellowstone National Park, Wyoming, U.S.

== See also ==
- Organism
