= Frédéric Le Junter =

French musician and experimental musical instrument builder

Frédéric Le Junter (born in Dunkirk in 1956) is a French experimental musical instrument builder, as well as a performance and installation artist. He is using self-made instruments and mechanical machines. He has already built 150 musical machines. He created similar machines for light and visual installations. He has also build external installations powered by water or wind to create sounds and music. He recorded five studio albums, two in collaboration with Pierre Berthet and one with Dominique Répécaud. He also recorded songs with Pierre Bastien.

== Visual installations ==
- Zone translucide at Maison Salvan, 2009

== Sound installations ==
- 2015 Avec le vent, sound installation at Mons 2015 European Capital of Culture
- 2014 Jardin composite, sound installation at the 30th Festival Musique Action, Vandœuvre-lès-Nancy

== Discography ==
- Bateau feu, 2017
- Chansons impopulaires, 2005

=== With Pierre Berthet ===
- L'Enclume des jours, 2011
- Berthet - Le Junter, 1994

=== With Dominique Répécaud ===
- Les Massifs de fleurs - T’es pas drône, 2015
