= Insect and Individual Silenced =

Studio album by Nurse with Wound
- Released: 1981
- Recorded: October 1981
- Genres: Industrial, experimental
- Length: 56:13
- Label: United Dairies
- Producer: Steven Stapleton

Nurse with Wound chronology
| Merzbild Schwet (1980) | Insect and Individual Silenced (1981) | Homotopy to Marie (1982) |

Insect and Individual Silenced is the fourth album by Nurse with Wound.

The album was recorded in 1981 with core member Steven Stapleton being joined by drummer Trevor Reidy and JG Thirlwell of Foetus for the track "Absent Old Queen Underfoot". Reidy and Thirlwell worked in the same Virgin store in London at the time and met Stapleton there. The album, however, is best known for Stapleton's long held disregard of its contents. He told David Keenan that the album was "dreadful" and "a pile of shit", stating that "making that record was the worst mistake of my life". Keenan declares the record to be nowhere near as bad as Stapleton suggests but agrees that it is a less disciplined album than those immediately surrounding it. Stapleton also advised Keenan that he had burned the mastertapes.

Stapleton initially pledged never to reissue the album and stated to Keenan that it would never be available on CD. However, he recanted this position in 2006 following two events detailed by Stapleton in the sleevenotes to the new edition. Matt Waldron (working under his usual moniker irr. app. (ext.)) created a reworked version of the album which he sent to Stapleton who, delighted by it, contacted Waldron. The two became good friends and Waldron has since collaborated with NWW both live and in the studio. Waldron's version was slated for release through World Serpent but this release was cancelled when World Serpent went out of business in 2004. At present, only a small number of copies, handmade by Waldron, exist. Shortly after this, another friend of Stapleton, Christoph Heemann, told him that Kevin Spencer of Robot Records (Heemann, Organum, The New Blockaders etc.) had created a digital remaster of the album from a vinyl copy for his own pleasure. When Stapelton heard this master, he found he was happy with the sound quality and that the album was not as bad as his memory had led him to believe. The album was therefore reissued in April 2007.

The original LP release was pressed in an edition of 1000 with a small overrun of 10 copies coming in handmade sleeves. A cassette edition was issued at the same time. However, around 1987, the United Dairies catalogue began to describe this as a "remix". Some sources declare that this edition is drastically reworked. If this is the case, then the exact date at which Stapleton destroyed the tapes may be moot. The cassette format is still available via U.S. label RRR under a licensing deal covering a number of early United Dairies cassette releases. A widely circulated "United Dairies" CD edition was a bootleg. The 2007 CD edition used the aforementioned remaster by Kevin Spencer and came as a standard CD in digipak covered with a plastic slipcase with Stapleton's sleevenote and a special edition with a framed and mounted insect in a box signed by Stapleton. When this went out of print, a new edition was prepared in 2010 that disposed of the plastic slipcase and added a newly prepared remix track, entitled "Tooth, Teeth, Milk, Teeth, Skin."

In the liner notes, the album is dedicated to Boris Vian. The dedication thus continues a tradition of Nurse with Wound releases being explicitly dedicated to, or otherwise inspired by earlier surreal or "weird" artists; the debut album Chance Meeting... had been dedicated to Luigi Russolo, and the following album Homotopy to Marie was listed as being inspired by Franz Kamin.

== Track listing ==
=== Side one ===
1. "Alvin's Funeral (The Milk Was Delivered in Black Bottles)" – 27:18

=== Side two ===
1. "Absent Old Queen Underfoot" – 21:12
2. "Mutilés de Guerre" – 6:53
