= Spiral Insana =

Studio album by Nurse with Wound
- Released: 1986
- Recorded: 1985–1986
- Genres: Industrial, experimental, drone
- Label: Torso
- Producer: Steven Stapleton

Nurse with Wound chronology
The Sylvie and Babs Hi-Fi Companion (1985)	Spiral Insana (1986)	Soliloquy for Lilith (1988)

Professional ratings
Review scores
Source	Rating
AllMusic	2.5/5 stars

Spiral Insana is an album by Nurse with Wound.

In the book England's Hidden Reverse, author David Keenan describes the album as one of NWW's "most powerful records", but principal member Steven Stapleton advised Keenan that the making of Spiral Insana was particularly difficult. Torso Records had given Stapleton an advance of £3000 to make the album and Stapleton states that he felt under a degree of pressure as a result — "[e]very three or four weeks, they'd send a representative over to listen to what I had done so far. Spiral Insana was a sprawling mess until I put it together and edited it into what I wanted it to be."

The album features a contribution by Organum's principal member David Jackman. During the mid-1980s, Stapleton and Jackman worked together a number of times, with Nurse with Wound and Organum splitting an LP on United Dairies and Stapleton appearing on some Organum recordings including "Submission", "Vacant Lights" and "Crux".

The album was issued on LP by Torso in 1986 and on cassette by United Dairies (Stapleton's own label) in 1987. A CD release came through United Dairies in 1997 which came with new artwork and two additional tracks (one previously unreleased track, 'Nihil', and 'Mourning Smile' from the album Drunk with the Old Man of the Mountains), extending the album by 25 minutes. The present edition of the album was released on CD by Jnana Records in 2009. This version restored the original 1986 artwork whilst retaining the extended 1997 CD track listing.

== Track listing ==
Original LP and cassette

Side A

A. Sea Armchair
B. Migration to the Head
C. Earthwork
D. Red Period
E. This Lady Is for Burning
F. Chasing the Carrot
G. Sugarland
H. There's Always Another Illusion
I. Stewing the Red Herring

Side B

J. Pulse Interplay
K. A View from Lammas Tower
L. Swallowhead
M. Fitching a Wrong Sucker
N. All That's Left-Over
O. Forever Chasing the Carrot
P. The Terminal Song
Q. Ship of the Dead
R. Obituary Obligation

1997 and 2009 CD editions

A. Sea Armchair
B. Migration to the Head
C. Earthwork
D. Red Period
E. This Lady Is for Burning
F. Chasing the Carrot
G. Sugarland
H. There's Always Another Illusion
I. Stewing the Red Herring (A to I are encoded as one track, lasting 19:28)
J. Mourning Smile
K. Pulse Interplay
L. A View from Lammas Tower
M. Swallowhead
N. Fitching a Wrong Sucker
O. All That's Left-Over
P. Forever Chasing the Carrot
Q. The Terminal Song
R. Ship of the Dead
S. Obituary Obligation (J to S are also encoded as one track, lasting 26:09)
T. Nihil (15:07)

The lettering system is used on all editions of the album to date.
