= Jac Berrocal =

French trumpeter, singer and composer

Jacques "Jac" Berrocal (born 22 October 1946, Saint-Jean d'Angély) is a French trumpeter, singer and composer. He has been active since the 1970s in the independent and avant-garde music scene, and has released many albums. He also founded and performed in the group Catalogue, and has collaborated with Ron Anderson. Berrocal has also appeared in several films.

== Select discography ==
Berrocal

- 1964, "Be-Bop-a-Lula", 45 rpm
- 1973, Musiq Musik, LP (2019, Rotorelief)
- 1976, Parallèles, LP (2019, Rotorelief)
- 1979, Catalogue, LP (2019, Rotorelief)
- 1992, CD, La nuit est au courant
- 1996, Hotel Hotel, LP
- 1996, ROCK'n ROLL STATION, VINCE TAYLOR & JAC BERROCAL, 45 rpm
- 1997, Oblique Sessions, CD (with Pierre Bastien, Pascal Comelade and Jaki Liebezeit)
- 1999, Flash, 33 rpm 10"
- 2002, Prières, 33 rpm 10"
- 2008, Marie-Antoinette is not dead, 7 inch
- 2011, Superdisque, CD, LP (with David Fenech and Ghédalia Tazartès)
- 2014, MDLV, CD, LP
- 2015, Antigravity, CD, LP (with David Fenech and Vincent Epplay)
- 2017, Why, EP (with David Fenech and Vincent Epplay)
- 2019, Ice Exposure, LP, CD (with David Fenech and Vincent Epplay)
- 2019, 1973-1976-1979, Musiq Musik LP, Parallèles LP, Catalogue LP, Box set + Book Rotorelief
- 2020, Fallen Chrome, CD, (with Riverdog), nato
- 2020, Xmas in March, LP (with David Fenech and Jason Willett)
- 2021, Exterior Lux, LP, CD (with David Fenech and Vincent Epplay)
- 2022, Transcodex, LP, CD (with David Fenech and Vincent Epplay)
- 2022, Zilveli Villa, 45 rpm (with David Fenech and Vincent Epplay)
- 2024, Broken Allures, LP, CD (with David Fenech Vincent Epplay Cosey Fanni Tutti and Jah Wobble )

Catalogue (Band)

- 1979, Catalogue : Antwerpen Live, LP
- 1982, Catalogue : Pénétration, LP+Maxi
- 1987, Catalogue : Insomnie, LP
- 1987, Catalogue' : Pas touch, 45 rpm
- 2010, Catalogue : Brussels Live, LP

MKB Fraction Provisoire

- 1993, Feu! (featuring Jac Berrocal), CD (2024, LP, CD, Rotorelief)

Video-Adventures

- 1979, VIDEO-AVENTURES: CAMERA IN FOCUS, CAMERA AL RIPARO

== Filmography ==
- Les Chants de Bataille - Jac Berrocal, a film by Guy Girard, 47’ 2004?

Actor in feature-length films

- 1971, Hare Rama Hare Krishna, dir. Dev Anand
- 1992, Confessions d'un Barjo, dir. Jérôme Boivin
- 1984, Diesel, dir. Robert Kramer
- 1985, Rouge Baiser, dir. Véra Belmont
- 1987, Irina et les ombres, dir. Alain Robak
- 1987, Agent trouble, dir. Jean-Pierre Mocky
- 1987, Le Miraculé, dir. Jean-Pierre Mocky
