= Soliloquy for Lilith =

Studio album by Nurse with Wound
- Released: 1988
- Recorded: May 1988
- Genres: Drone; dark ambient; industrial; aleatoric music; process music
- Length: 106:43
- Label: Idle Hole
- Producers: Steven Stapleton; Diana Rogerson

Nurse with Wound chronology
Spiral Insana (1986)	Soliloquy for Lilith (1988)	A Sucked Orange (1990)

Professional ratings
Review scores
Source	Rating
AllMusic	4/5 stars

Soliloquy for Lilith is an album by English experimental project Nurse with Wound, originally released in 1988 by the label Idle Hole that had been created for the album's release by project leader Steven Stapleton, and later reissued several times by varying record labels. It is considered one of the project's greatest albums, as well as a long-standing industrial drone record best known for its aleatoric method of composition. FACT ranked it the 54th best album of the 80s with Aaron Turner of Isis calling it "one of the most listenable and enduring albums from the vast NWW catalog".

== Background and recording ==
The album was recorded by Steven Stapleton and his wife Diana Rogerson, credited as Calhoun Phelan in the album's liner notes, in May 1988. No instruments per se were used on the record; the only sound source was a number of effects units which he had set up to operate in a feedback loop. There was no original input signal being processed, simply the feedback hum generated by plugging the original chain of pedals back into itself. However, when Stapleton went near the pedals he found the sound changed in accordance with his proximity to the various pedals and units.

Stapleton told author David Keenan (in the book England's Hidden Reverse) that he had then essentially created the album's compositions by gently moving his fingers above the various units to create the slow, subtle changes in sound, tone and timbre; in later years he has put the album down to an electrical fault of some sort in the studio it was recorded in. This was acknowledged on a later reissue with the credit "our thanks to Electricity for making this recording possible". He remains proud of the album, describing it to Keenan as "fucking brilliant". The album title refers to Stapleton and Rogerson's daughter Lilith who was born that year; Lilith would go on to contribute both artwork and vocals to releases by NWW and Current 93.

== Release history ==
Despite being a limited edition three-record set in an embossed box, which made it a more expensive album to package, the album was one of the most successful NWW releases of Stapleton's career, and reissues since its original release have continued to sell; Stapleton also told Keenan that the sales of the album funded his and his family's move to Cooloorta in County Clare, Ireland in 1989. Originally issued on the short-lived Idle Hole label (founded by Stapleton and Rogerson with a government Enterprise Allowance Scheme grant), a small overrun of the third disc was issued separately as Soliloquy For Lilith Parts 5 & 6. The album was reissued as a double CD on United Dairies via World Serpent in 1993 and then again in 2003, this time as a 3 disc set mirroring the box packaging of the original with the third disc containing two remixes of the original material by Stapleton and Colin Potter. When World Serpent Distribution went out of business in 2004, the 3-CD set was reissued by United Jnana (a hook-up between Stapleton's label United Dairies and Mark Logan's label Jnana Records), this present edition being identical in all but catalogue number from its predecessor.

The album's original six selections follow a strict convention: each is between 17 and 18 minutes in length. Later editions featured two bonus selections. Of these, the first (VII) was a remix of the original album's third selection, with additional effects and using the latter as a backing track, each running for the same length. The later bonus track runs for over 20 minutes.

Releases of the album commonly feature depictions of the Burney Relief in the album artwork; the significance of this is that the central figure depicted has been identified with Lilith.

== Track listing ==
All tracks are written by Steven Stapleton and Diana Rogerson.

No.	Title	Length
1.	"[untitled]"	17:56
2.	"[untitled]"	17:06
3.	"[untitled]"	17:51
4.	"[untitled]"	17:51
5.	"[untitled]"	17:29
6.	"[untitled]"	17:30

Bonus tracks (2003/2005 editions)
No.	Title	Length
7.	"[untitled]"	18:54
8.	"[untitled]"	20:52
