= Merzbild Schwet =

Studio album by Nurse with Wound
- Released: 1980
- Recorded: May 1980
- Genres: Industrial, experimental
- Length: 48:46
- Label: United Dairies
- Producers: The Bombay Ducks, Steven Stapleton

Nurse with Wound chronology
To the Quiet Men from a Tiny Girl (1980)	Merzbild Schwet (1980)	Insect and Individual Silenced (1981)

Professional ratings
Review scores
Source	Rating
AllMusic	link

Merzbild Schwet is the third album by British industrial band Nurse with Wound.

Following disagreements amongst the founding NWW trio over To the Quiet Men from a Tiny Girl, Steven Stapleton returned to the studio without Heman Pathak or John Fothergill to create something that more closely fulfilled his vision of what Nurse with Wound should be. The result has been cited as the first great NWW album, with Rolf Semprebon at AllMusic stating that it constitutes "the first fully realized NWW record....a far more mature effort than its predecessors, much more focused and sounding less like some stoned guys goofing off in the studio".

There is a more extensive use of tape editing and audio collage on Merzbild Schwet than was found on the preceding releases, a strategy that would become Stapleton's signature sound on the albums that followed. There is also the overt use of humour; the sound of a repeated loud vinyl pop being included at the beginning of "Futurismo", initially creating the impression that the record is in some way damaged, accelerates to such a speed that it becomes obvious that it is part of the composition (the impact of this device losing relevance on subsequent cassette and CD editions).

Although Fothergill was not involved in the recording, he is credited as a member on the sleeve; Pathak had already departed by the time the release was being prepared. Shortly following the simultaneous release of this album and To the Quiet Men from a Tiny Girl, Fothergill would split from Nurse with Wound and their nascent United Dairies record label, leaving Stapleton with sole curatorship of both, a position he maintains to this day.

The album was issued in an initial hand-numbered pressing of 500, with number 310 being the source of a widespread bootleg pressing. It was issued on cassette by United Dairies in 1980 and by U.S. label Cause And Effect in 1986 alongside the first two albums in a set called Ladies Home Tickler (Three Piece Sweet). In 1990, a CD edition followed, as well as a further 1000 vinyl copies as part of the Psilotripitaka box set. Two vinyl reissues were released on both United Dairies (green vinyl) and Cargo Records (blue vinyl) in 2019.

== Track listing ==
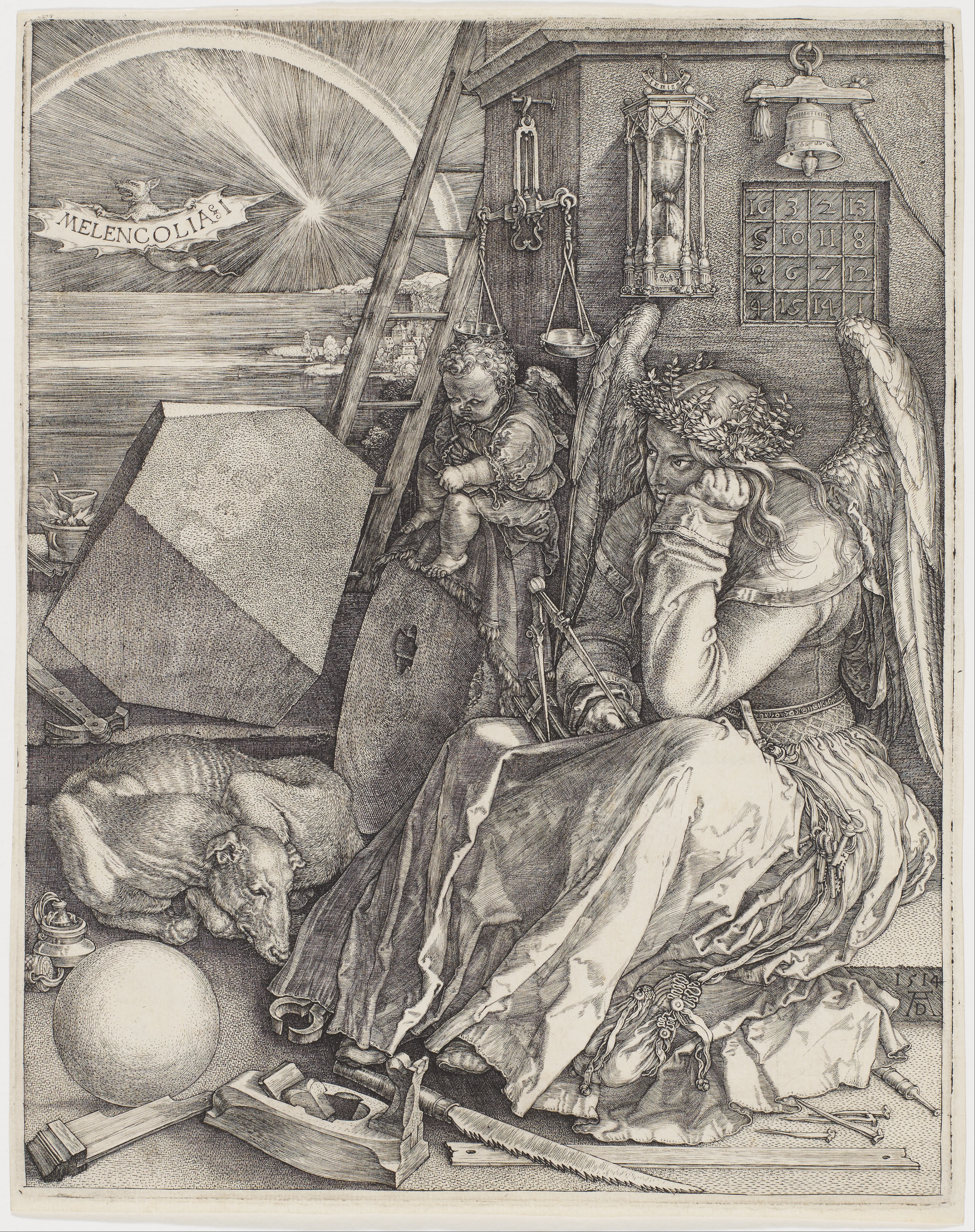
The solid, polyhedron shape from Dürer's Melancolia I was used in the album's artwork

=== Vinyl and cassette pressings ===
Side one

1. "Dada^{x}" – 24:45

Side two

1. "Futurismo" – 24:45

=== initial CD pressing (1990) ===
1. "Futurismo" – 24:45
2. "Dada^{x}" – 24:45

=== remastered CD pressing (2019) ===
1. "Dada^{x}" – 24:45
2. "Futurismo" – 24:45
3. "(untitled)" – 12:21

== Album cover ==
The album cover is a black-and-white collage by Stapleton, with several macabre elements taken from European art. The central figure is an anatomical diagram, flanked by skulls, skeletons and decapitated figures. At upper left, a small element shows a procession of hooded figures walking past two others; this is taken from a Gustave Doré illustration for a scene in Dante's Divine Comedy. At the upper center, the artist name "nurse with wound" is inscribed on a solid object. The object is a polyhedron, taken from the engraving Melancolia I, by Albrecht Dürer.
