= Brume =

Brume is a surname. It is also an English and French word for mist. Notable people with the surname include:

- Ese Brume (born 1996), Nigerian athlete
- Fred Aghogho Brume (1942–2011), Nigerian politician

== See also ==
- Brum (surname)
- Brumm (surname)
