= Rotorelief =

French record label

- Founded: 2005
- Genre: Experimental music Psychedelic music Industrial music Noise music Post-punk; Krautrock
- Country of origin: FR
- Location: Brittany
- Official website: www.rotorelief.com

Rotorelief Records, founded in 2005, is an independent French label that publishes vinyl and CD phonographic editions, with the aim of offering high-quality collectors' records in limited, numbered quantities, whether enhanced and expanded reissues or brand-new productions, thanks to immediate collaboration between the label and artists, musicians, graphic designers, visual artists and sound engineers.

The label offers a wide range of conceptual albums in the experimental and psychedelic area, new releases to discover and also numerous CD and vinyl reissues, sometimes revisited and augmented. The label has also worked hard to discover or rediscover little-known nuggets from France's post-industrial music scene around the '80s, as well as some of the international pioneers of this old-school noise and industrial scene. The catalog also includes a number of UFO nuggets from the 60s and 70s, psychedelic and krautrock projects, cold wave and post-punk pop from the 80s, and very recently, current crossover industrial hip hop artists... A few masters of free-jazz and deviant rock have also joined the catalog.

== Artists ==
- Nurse With Wound (uk)
- Silver Apples (us)
- Sand (de)
- Coil (uk)
- Conrad Schnitzler (de)
- Joseph Beuys + Pissoff (de)
- Jac Berrocal (fr)
- Vivenza (fr)
- Brume (fr)
- Pacific 231 (fr)

== Releases ==
- ROTOR0091 Nurse With Wound "Backside" [LP] (2025)
- ROTOR0090 Nurse With Wound "Huffin' Rag Blues" [2LP] (2025)
- ROTOR0089 Nurse With Wound "Merzbild Schwet" [LP] (2024)
- ROTOR0088 Marc Hurtado · Mark Cunningham "Infini" [CD] (2024)
- ROTOR0087 Stenka Bazin "Guanajuato" [LP] (2024)
- ROTOR0084 Nurse With Wound "Chance Meeting On A Dissecting Table Of A Sewing Machine And An Umbrella" [LP] (2024)
- ROTOR0083 La Division Technique "Traversant les cités liquides" [CD] (2023)
- ROTOR0082 MKB Fraction Provisoire "Feu!" [LP, CD] (2024)
- ROTOR0081 Camizole "Erahtic" [LP] (2023)
- ROTOR0080 Nurse With Wound "Bar Maldoror" [2LP] (2023)
- ROTOR0079 Urbain Autopsy "Inonu" [2LP, 2CD] (2022)
- ROTOR0078 Conrad Schnitzler & Pharmakustik "Schubkraft" [LP] (2021)
- ROTOR0077 Nurse With Wound "Gyllensköld, Geijerstam And I at Rydberg's" [2LP (2020), CD + Art Book (2021)]
- ROTOR0076 Beuys + Pissoff "Creamcheese Düsseldorf 1968" [LP, CD] (2021)
- ROTOR0075 Moodie Black "MB III" [10 inch] (2019)
- ROTOR0074 Alesia Cosmos "Aeroproducts" [2LP, 2CD] (2019)
- ROTOR717273 Jac Berrocal "1973-1976-1979" [BOX Set 3xLP + Book] (2019)
- ROTOR0073 Jac Berrocal "Catalogue" [LP] (2019)
- ROTOR0072 Jac Berrocal "Paralleles" [LP] (2019)
- ROTOR0071 Jac Berrocal "Musiq Musik" [LP] (2019)
- ROTOR0070 Nurse With Wound "Homotopy To Marie" [2LP, 2CD + Art Book] (2018)
- ROTOR0069 Sand "Vibrating Cloud" [LP, CD] (2019)
- ROTOR0068 The Bonaparte's "Welcome to the Isle of Dogs" [LP, CD] (2019)
- ROTOR0067 La Division Technique "Nebula" [LP] (2019)
- ROTOR0066 Conrad Schnitzler & Pharmakustik "Extruder" [LP] (2018)
- ROTOR0064 La Division Technique [LP] (2017)
- ROTOR0063 The Bonaparte's "Shiny Battles" [LP, CD] (2017)
- ROTOR0062 Maurizio Bianchi "Technology" [2LP] (2018)
- ROTOR0061 Brume&John Grieve "Nihil Unbound" [LP]
- ROTOR0060 Brume "Autoportrait" [LP]
- ROTOR0059 Urbain Autopsy "From Somewhere To Nowhere" [2LP]
- ROTOR0058 Siglo XX "Still" [LP]
- ROTOR0057 A.I.Z "Chaos Primaire" [LP]
- ROTOR0056 Silver Apples "Contact" [LP (2017), CD (2019)]
- ROTOR0055 Silver Apples "s/t" [LP (2017), CD (2019)]
- ROTOR0054 Maurizio Bianchi "Aktivitat" [LP]
- ROTOR0053 Urbain Autopsy "Autopsies" [LP]
- ROTOR0052 Étant donnés "Le soleil, la mer, le coeur et les étoiles" [LP]
- ROTOR0051 Conrad Schnitzler & Pharmakustik "Kontraktion" [LP] (2016)
- ROTOR0050 Nurse With Wound "Spiral Insana" [2LP, 2CD + Art Book] (2016)
- ROTOR0049 Die Form÷Hurt "Hurt & Die Form" [LP]
- ROTOR0048 Entre Vifs "Première Unité Bruitiste" [LP]
- ROTOR0047 Bruitisme¹ "Various artists: Vivenza, Brume, Le Syndicat, Lieutenant Caramel" [LP]
- ROTOR0046 Pacific 231 "Unusual Perversions" [LP]
- ROTOR0045 Le Syndicat&Pharmakustik "Plasmoglitch" [LP]
- ROTOR0044 Maurizio Bianchi "Symphony for a Genocide" [LP]
- ROTOR0043 Die Form÷Fine Automatic "Fine Automatic & Die Form" [2LP]
- ROTOR0042 Le Syndicat "Audiostaik Repress" [LP]
- ROTOR0041 Maurizio Bianchi "Neuro Habitat" [LP]
- ROTOR0040 Le Syndicat "Second Empire" [LP]
- ROTOR0039 Cromagnon "Orgasm" [LP] (2015], [CD] (2024)
- ROTOR0038 Brume + [Vomir] "Unstable" [LP]
- ROTOR0037 Maurizio Bianchi "weltanschauung" [LP] (2013)
- ROTOR0034 Le Syndicat & Sektor 304 "Geometry of Chromium Skin" [LP] (2013)
- ROTOR0033 Vivenza "Fondements Bruitistes" [LP, CD, CD-Book] (2014)
- ROTOR0032 Frog "Frog 2" [LP] (2013)
- ROTOR0031 Fujako "Landform Erosion" [LP] (1 August 2012)
- ROTOR0030 Parazite "Le Bunker de la Dernière Rafale" [LP] (2013)
- ROTOR0029 Vivenza "Veriti Plastici" [LP] (19 June 2012)
- ROTOR0028 Brume "Xerxès" [LP] (10 July 2012)
- ROTOR0027 Takaaaki "Netsu" [LP] (14 November 2012)
- ROTOR0026 Vivenza "Réalité de l'automation directe" [LP, CD] (1 September 2011)
- ROTOR0025 Les Belles Noïseuses "whither than white" [LP] (1 February 2011)
- ROTOR0024 Bryin Dall "Deconstructing Hank" [LP] (1 February 2011)
- ROTOR0023 Vivenza "Modes Réels Collectifs" [LP, CD] (8 November 2010)
- ROTOR0022 Pharmakustik "neurochemie" [LP] (7 July 2010)
- ROTOR0021 CoH "Z-Rated" [CD] (October 2010)
- ROTOR0020 Le Syndicat "festin d'acier" [LP] (7 July 2010)
- ROTOR0019 Roxy Epoxy "1000" [12"] (7 July juillet 2010)
- ROTOR0018 Brume "Ainsi soit-il!" [LP] (5 January 2010)
- ROTOR0017 Ilitch "Life out of Time" [LP] (5 January 2010)
- ROTOR0016 Pacific 231 & Vox Populi! "Aramesh" [CD] (8 July 2009)
- ROTOR0015 Pacific 231 & Lieutenant Caramel "Just digging the crazy art" [LP] (8 July 2009)
- ROTOR0014 Vivenza "Réalités Servomécaniques" [LP, CD, CD-Book] (8 July 2009)
- ROTOR0013 Maurizio Bianchi / M.B. "Persecutionem" [LP] (8 July 2009)
- ROTOR0012 Ether "Music for air raids V2.0" [LP] (8 July 2009)
- ROTOR0011 Nurse With Wound "Chromanatron" [LP, CD] (2013)
- ROTOR0010 Current 93 "when the may rain comes" [12", CD] (November 2010)
- ROTOR0008 Sand "Sylph Ballet" [LP, CD] (2 August 2012)
- ROTOR0007 Sand "Desert Navigation" [LP, CD] (2011)
- ROTOR0006 Sand "Golem" [LP, CD] (November 2010)
- ROTOR0005 Sand "His First Steps" [LP, CD] (2015)
- ROTOR0004 Brume (band) [8"] (2009)
- ROTOR0003 Jac Berrocal, Marie France & Jack Belsen "Marie Antoinette is not dead" [7"] (25 November 2008)
- ROTOR0002 Pacific 231 – "Ethnicities" [LP, CD] (13 novembre 2006)
- ROTOR0001 Coilectif – "In memory ov John Balance and homage to Coil" [2LP, CD] (13 November 2006)

== See also ==
- List of record labels
