= Ghédalia Tazartès =

French musician (1947–2021)

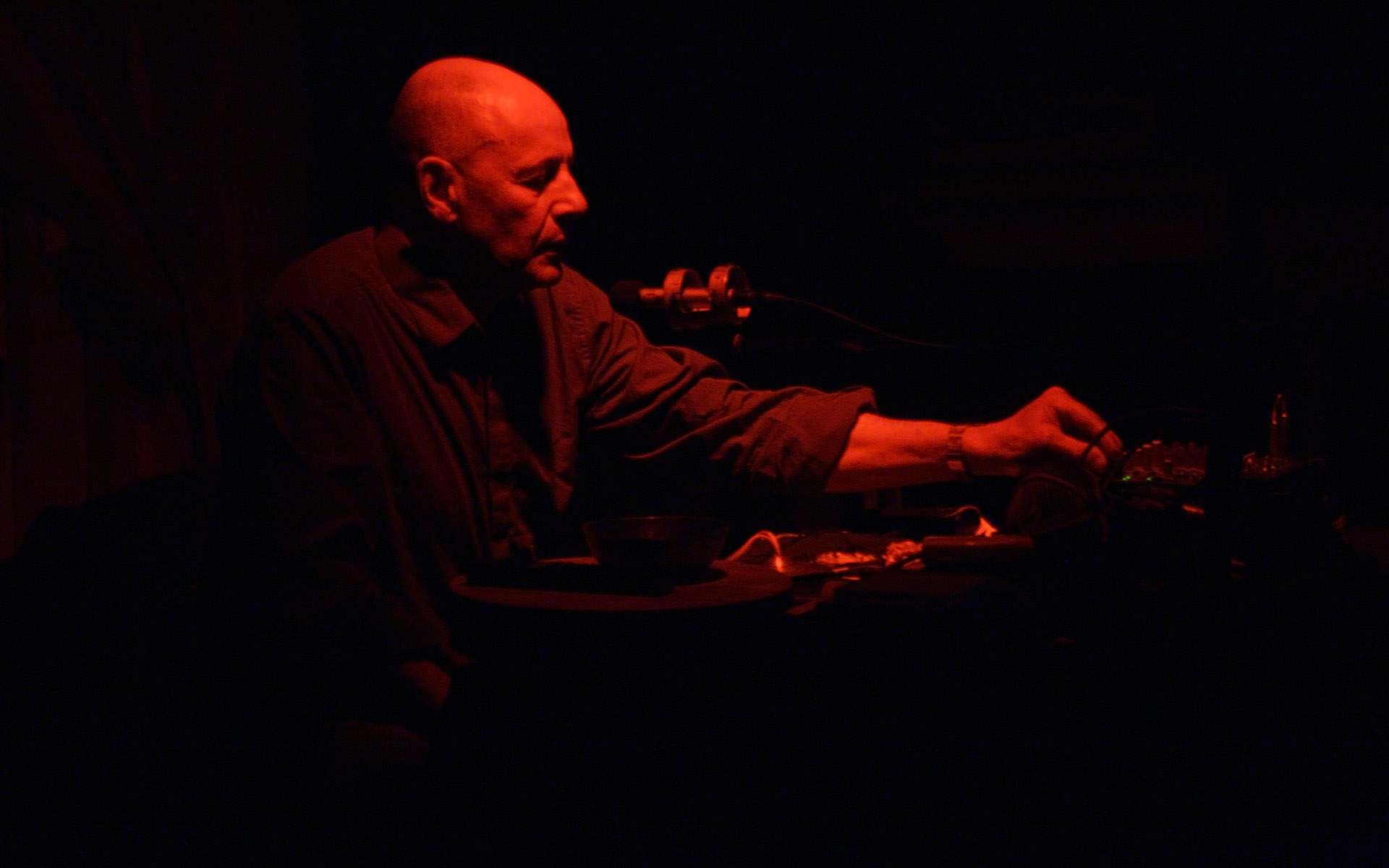
- Tazartès in 2012
- Born: 12 May 1947; Paris, France
- Died: 9 February 2021 (aged 73); Paris, France
- Occupation: Musician

Ghédalia Tazartès (12 May 1947 – 9 February 2021) was a French musician.

== Biography ==
Tazartès was born into a Judaeo-Spanish family in the 10th arrondissement of Paris. He quickly ascended into a musical career, with musician David Fenech defining his music as "unclassifiable". He rarely performed in concerts and released few albums, but was still able to make a living from dance, theatre, and cinema.

Tazartès was often perceived to be in the musique concrète genre, thanks to his manipulation of Revox tapes, although he later discovered the works of Pierre Schaeffer and Pierre Henry. He collaborated with Michel Chion on the albums La Ronde and Diasporas / Tazartès. According to Pierre Hemptinne, "What interests him is what these sound objects have to say about the world around us, the tangible and intangible world, the world of commercial and non-commercial exchange. It makes them more talkative, it makes them talk by plunging them into arrangements which are foreign to them. He cuts and edits sound images according to the techniques used in cinema and this technique brings out their meaning". Web magazine Néosphères said that "he reappropriates or recreates the idioms of certain traditional music". Additionally, he taught himself how to play a number of different instruments.

Ghédalia Tazartès died in Paris on 9 February 2021 at the age of 73.

== Discography ==
- Diasporas (1979)
- Tazartès' transports (1980)
- Une éclipse totale de soleil (1984)
- Tazartès (1987)
- Check Point Charlie (1990)
- Voyage à l’ombre (1997)
- 5 Rimbaud 1 Verlaine (2006)
- Les Danseurs de la pluie (2006)
- Jeanne (2007)
- Hystérie off Music (2007)
- Repas froid (2009)
- Ante Mortem (2010)
- Superdisque, with David Fenech and Jac Berrocal (2011)
