= Sample (material) =

Limited amount of something intended to represent a larger amount of the same

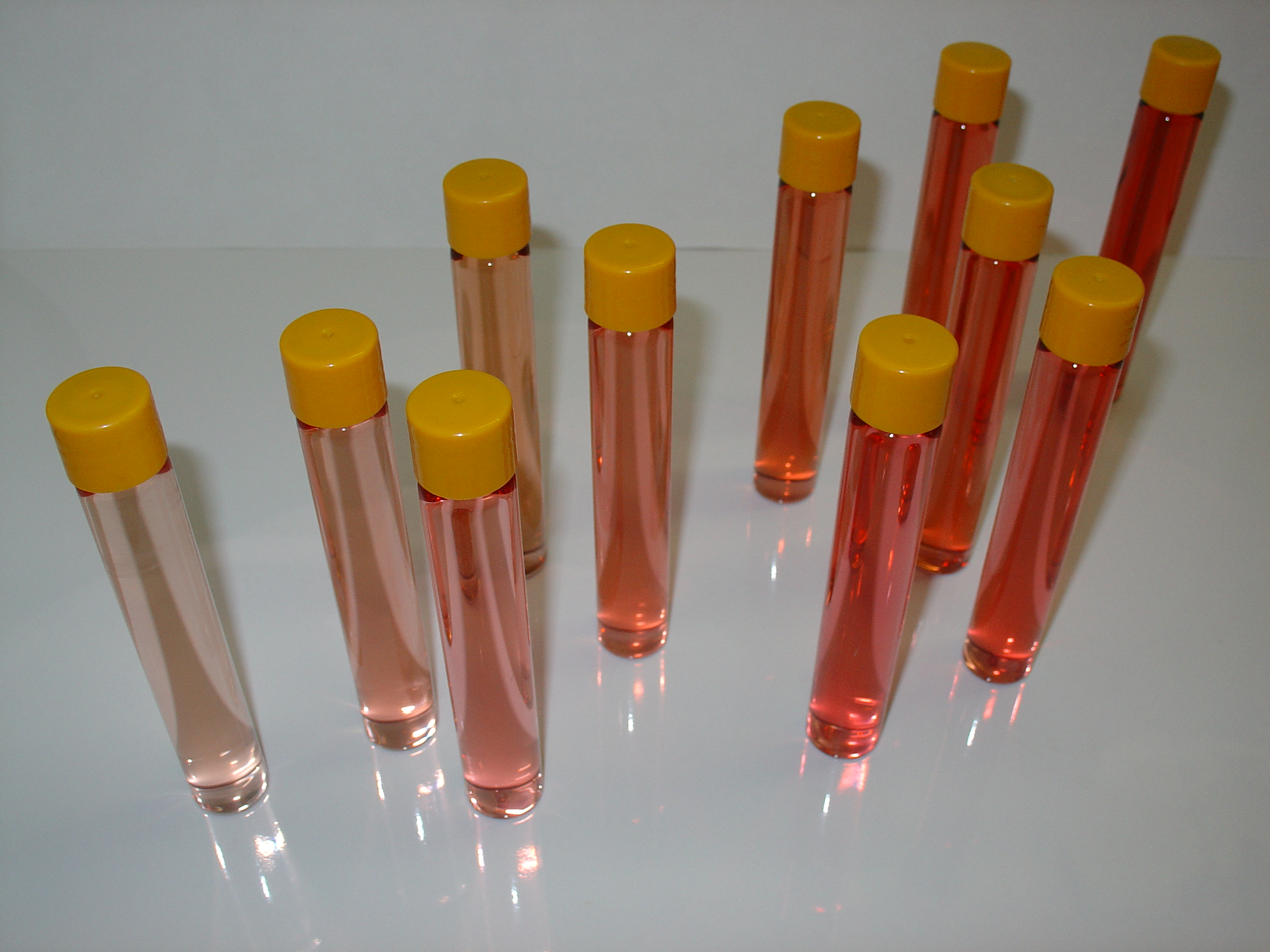
Samples of different rosé wines in glass tubes showing range of colours available

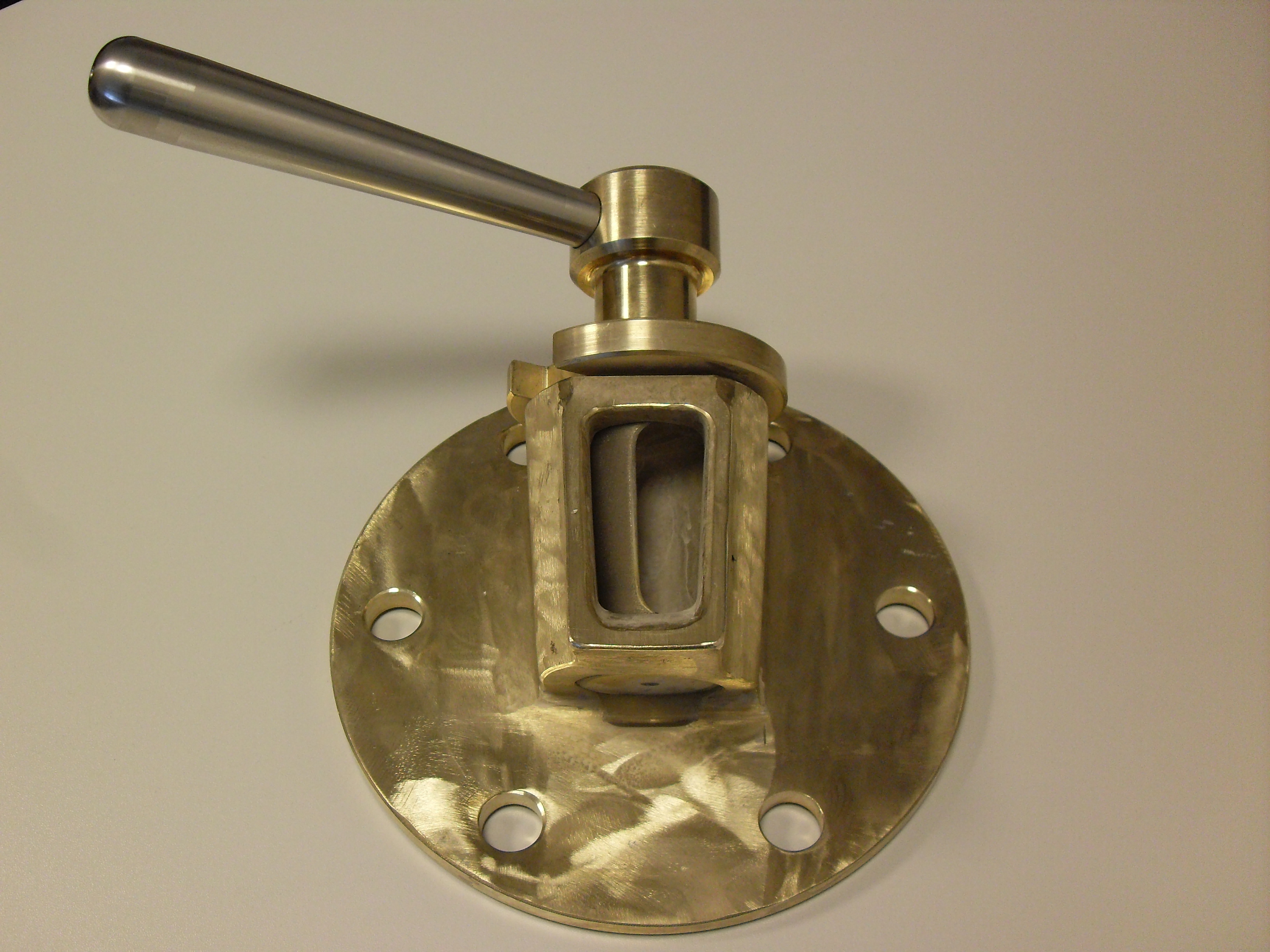
Sampling cock to take samples of crystal suspension in vacuum pans in the sugar industry

In general, a sample is a limited quantity of something which is intended to be similar to and represent a larger amount of that thing(s). The things could be countable objects such as individual items available as units for sale, or an uncountable material. Even though the word "sample" implies a smaller quantity taken from a larger amount, sometimes full biological or mineralogical specimens are called samples if they are taken for analysis, testing, or investigation like other samples. They are also considered samples in the sense that even whole specimens are "samples" of the full population of many individual organisms. The act of obtaining a sample is called "sampling" and can be performed manually by a person or by automatic process. Samples of material can be taken or provided for testing, analysis, investigation, quality control, demonstration, or trial use. Sometimes, sampling may be performed continuously.

== Aliquot part ==
In science, a representative liquid sample taken from a larger amount of liquid is sometimes called an aliquot or aliquot part where the sample is an exact divisor of the whole. For example, 10mL would be an aliquot part of a 100mL sample.

== Sample characteristics ==
The material may be solid, liquid, gas, a substance with some intermediate characteristics such as gel or sputum, tissue, organism, or a combination of these. Even if a material sample is not countable as individual items, the quantity of the sample may still be describable in terms of its volume, mass, size, or other such dimensions. A solid sample can come in one or a few discrete pieces, or it can be fragmented, granular, or powdered. A section of a rod, wire, cord, sheeting, or tubing may be considered a sample. Samples that are not solid pieces are usually kept in containers.

Where goods are sold or supplied by reference to a sample, relevant sale of goods legislation may dictate the supplier's legal obligations in ensuring that the bulk of the goods corresponds with the goods comprising the sample, for example in the UK, the Sale of Goods Act 1979, section 15, the Supply of Goods and Services Act 1982, section 5, and the Consumer Rights Act 2015, section 13.

== See also ==
- Core sample
- Ice core
- Specimen (disambiguation)
