= The Sylvie and Babs Hi-Fi Companion =

Studio album by Nurse with Wound
- Released: September 1985
- Recorded: 1983–1985
- Genres: Industrial, experimental, sound collage
- Length: 37:32
- Label: L.A.Y.L.A.H. / United Dairies
- Producer: Steven Stapleton

Nurse with Wound chronology
Brained by Falling Masonry (1984)	The Sylvie and Babs Hi-Fi Companion (1985)	Spiral Insana (1986)

Professional ratings
Review scores
Source	Rating
AllMusic	4/5 stars

The Sylvie and Babs Hi-Fi Companion is an album by Nurse with Wound.

In his book England's Hidden Reverse, David Keenan describes the album as "some light relief in the early Nurse catalogue". Steven Stapleton told Keenan "I wanted to make a record that was stolen from other people's records". Gary Levermore of Third Mind Records recalled to Keenan that Stapleton was "desperate to get his hands on a copy of Roger Miller's "King of the Road" in order to incorporate it into the forthcoming record".

Although largely collaged from easy listening records Stapleton acquired in the late 1970s and early 1980s, the album boasted a large cast list of over 40 people. John Balance is one of those who are credited, but he did not actually contribute. As Stapleton explained to Keenan, "I'd just finished this album with about 40 people on it. He said, "Can I be on it?". I said, "It's finished". He said, "I know but can you give me a credit anyway?", I said "Alright then." That was my first meeting with Balance."

== Track listing ==
1. You Walrus Hurt The One You Love
2. Great Balls Of Fur

Although all editions of this release contain these two tracks, there are several versions of this album.

An LP issued by LAYLAH came in two different editions, one subject to DMM Mastering (1988) and one not (1985). The music on each of these editions contained minor differences. The 1988 CD edition of L.A.Y.L.A.H. accidentally used the original 1985 mix. A cassette edition issued on United Dairies in 1987 contained a minute of music at the beginning of "Great Balls Of Fur" unheard on any other edition. The 1995 CD on United Dairies was retitled "The Sylvie and Babs High-Thigh Companion" and was again re-edited. The current 2CD United Dirter edition again uses the revised version and adds two new remixes, one by M.S. Waldron (irr.app.(ext.)) and one by Andrew Liles, and random non-LP tracks (some not included on 'Flawed Existence') from the mid-80s.
