= Otis Mensah =

English musician

- Origin: Sheffield, England
- Genre: Alternative hip hop ∙ Spoken word ∙ Jazz
- Occupations: Rapper, poet, spoken word artist
- Years active: 2015–present
- Label: Independent
- Website: www.otismensah.com

Otis Mensah is a British alternative hip-hop and spoken word artist. Mensah was the inaugural Poet Laureate of Sheffield.

== Career ==
Mensah has described their work as a means of challenging dominant models of masculinity, which they claim suppress the discussion of emotions, with negative consequences for mental health.

As a hip-hop artist, Mensah has performed at the BBC Music Introducing Stage at Glastonbury Festival, XJAZZ, We Out Here, and Fusion Festival. Their lyrics combine playful imagery and unconventional symbolism, often accompanied by boom bap instrumentals.

In November 2018, Magid Magid, the Lord Mayor of Sheffield, appointed Mensah as Poet Laureate of Sheffield. Mensah stated that they wish to use the position to "break down barriers" and change "elitism attached to poetry."

In March 2025, Mensah released their debut studio album titled before the noise my cousin with frequent producer and collaborator, the intern. The album had guest features from rappers Blu, Speech (of Arrested Development) and Lando Chill.

In 2026, Mensah announced that their second studio album titled Come Beautify The Night would release on November 13, 2026 via Paris-based label First Terrace Records and Australian-based label Part & Parcel. The album marks Mensah's compositional debut and included an album short film created with performance artist Jamal Sterrett. The album features artists, musicians and poets including Georgia Anne Muldrow, LIE NING, Wooly Aziz, Savanna 'Sweetwater' Morgan, Alexander Cromer, Adebola Oyekanmi and Marysia Osu.

== Discography ==
=== Studio Albums ===
Title	Release details
before the noise my cousin	• Released: March 14, 2025 • Format: Digital download, vinyl • Label: Self-released
Come Beautify The Night	• Release Date: November 13, 2026 • Format: Digital download, vinyl • Label: First Terrace Records, Part & Parcel Records

=== Extended Plays ===
Title	Release details
Blancmange Lounge Sessions	• Released: 15 December 2017 • Format: Digital download • Label: Self-released
Mum's House Philosopher	• Released: November 16, 2018 • Format: Digital download, CD • Label: Self-released
Rap Poetics	• Released: October 25, 2019 • Format: Digital download, CD • Label: Self-released
things I should have said a year ago	• Released: May 3, 2022 • Format: Digital download • Label: Self-released
WINTERSKIN	• Released: October 5, 2023 • Format: Digital download • Label: Lekker Collective
small town otis	• Released: March 26, 2026 • Format: Digital download • Label: Part & Parcel Records

=== Mixtapes ===
Title	Release details
Days Over Damson	• Released: February 5, 2016 • Format: Digital download, CD • Label: Self-released

=== Singles ===
- "Aurora" (2017)
- "Shadows X Void" (2017)
- "Creep & Crawl" (2017)
- "Free the Slaves" (2017)
- "Oh Jane" (2018)
- "Sanctified" (2018)
- "Solitude" (2018)
- "Float" (2018) (with Isaac Hopes)
- "Breath of Life" (2020) (with Hemlock Ernst)
- "Internet Cafe" (2020)
- "No Record Store Day" (2020)
- "The Thinks" (2020)
- "Troglodyte Jazz" (2021)
- "Like A Dog" (2021)
- "Garden of Eden" (2021)
- "Tumbleweeds" (2021)
- "SWELL" (2021)
- "Black Box" (2022)
- "Aurora Borealis" (2022)
- "Colour of Sunshine" (2024)
- "Tenderness and Cruelty" (2024) (with seigfried komidashi)
- "before the noise my cousin" (2025) (with the intern)
- "Silverfish" (2025) (with the intern)
- "twenty one weeks" (2026) (with seigfried komidashi)
- "slow dance" (2026) (with seigfried komidashi)
- "the night was wet and enduring" (2026) (featuring LIE NING)
- "prayerhands and headnods" (2026) (featuring Georgia Anne Muldrow)

== Bibliography ==
In 2020, Mensah published their debut poetry collection Safe Metamorphosis through Prototype Publishing.

A revised second edition was released in 2023.

Title	Publication details
Safe Metamorphosis (1st edition)	• Published: 15 June 2020 • Publisher: Prototype Publishing Ltd. • Format: Paperback • ISBN 978-1-913513-02-3
Safe Metamorphosis (2nd revised edition)	• Published: 2023 • Publisher: Prototype Publishing Ltd. • Format: Paperback • ISBN 978-1-913513-02-3
