= The Heart of No Place =

2009 independent film

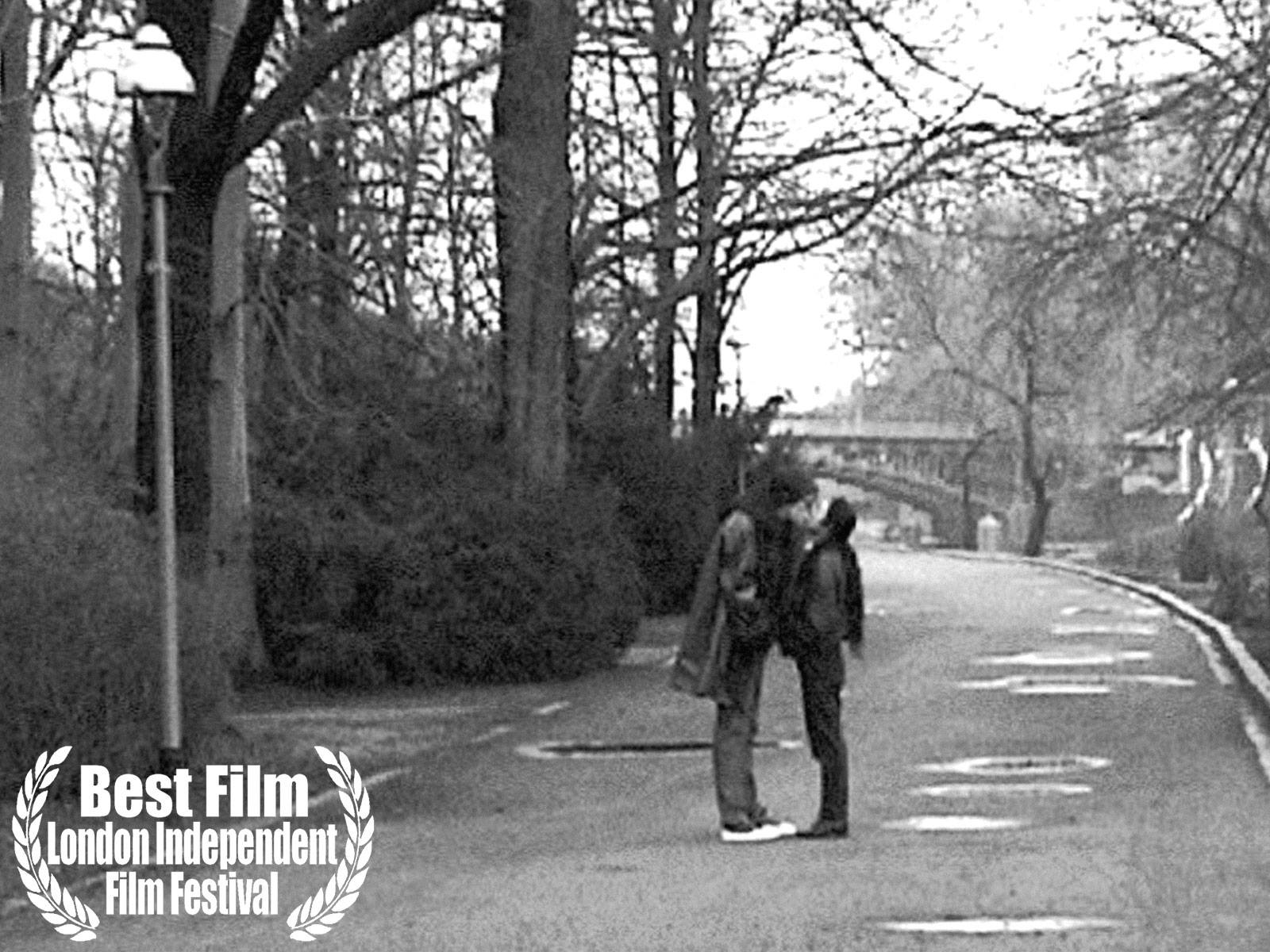
- The Heart of No Place still
- Directed by: Rika Ohara
- Written by: Rika Ohara
- Produced by: Bluefat Music
- Starring: Rika Ohara, Charles Lane, Daniel Lynch Millner, Sarah Holbert
- Cinematography: Rika Ohara
- Music by: John Payne
- Release date: March 21, 2009
- Running time: 85 minutes
- Country: United States
- Language: English
- Budget: $25,000

The Heart of No Place is a 2009 independent film written and directed by Rika Ohara, based on reinterpretation of Yoko Ono's life and work. Shot entirely on Digital 8 on location in Los Angeles, Berlin, Tokyo, Liverpool and Ho Chi Minh City, and with participation of many Los Angeles- and German artists and musicians, the film won the Best Film (International) award at the London Independent Film Festival 2010. The film's soundtrack was composed by John Payne and features songs by Yoko Ono, Dieter Moebius, The Dark Bob and Anna Homler.

== Plot ==
Rock widow Y. tries to come to terms with the death of her husband, the Artist Known as John. Sharing her grief is her assistant Charles, whose partner died of AIDS. When she meets Andrea, a young journalist with wild ideas about art and technology, she is awakened to parallels between her artwork, technology and economy. Daniel Mohn, the visionary founder and CEO of Monosoft, reminds her that the Cold War wasn’t won by missiles, but by artists like herself and her late husband.

== Cast ==
- Rika Ohara as Y.
- John Payne as The Artist Known as John
- Charles Lane as The Assistant
- Sarah Holbert as Andrea
- Daniel Lynch Millner as Daniel Mohn
- Tress MacNeille as The Collector
- Carl Stone as Almost Himself
- Dieter Moebius and Michael Rother as themselves

== Distribution ==
The film was first presented at the Créteil International Women's Film Festival in France on March 21, 2009. The picture screened at various film festivals, including Göteborg International Film Festival and London Independent Film Festival.

=== Exhibition dates ===
- Finland: May 15, 2010, Polar Film Festival
- France: March 21, 2009, Créteil International Women's Film Festival
- Hungary: September 24, 2010, Tisza Cinema Festival
- Italy: June 3, 2010, Festival Un Film per la Pace
- Portugal: November 13, 2009, Filmes Sobre Arte
- Romania: October 3, 2010, Romania International Film Festival
- Sweden: February 7, 2010, Göteborg International Film Festival
- Thailand: November 8, 2010 World Film Festival of Bangkok
- United Kingdom: April 17, 2010 London Independent Film Festival

== Awards ==
Win

• London Independent Film Festival: Best Film, 2010.

In Competition

• Festival Internazionale Un Film per la Pace, Udine-Gorizia
