= First Terrace Records =

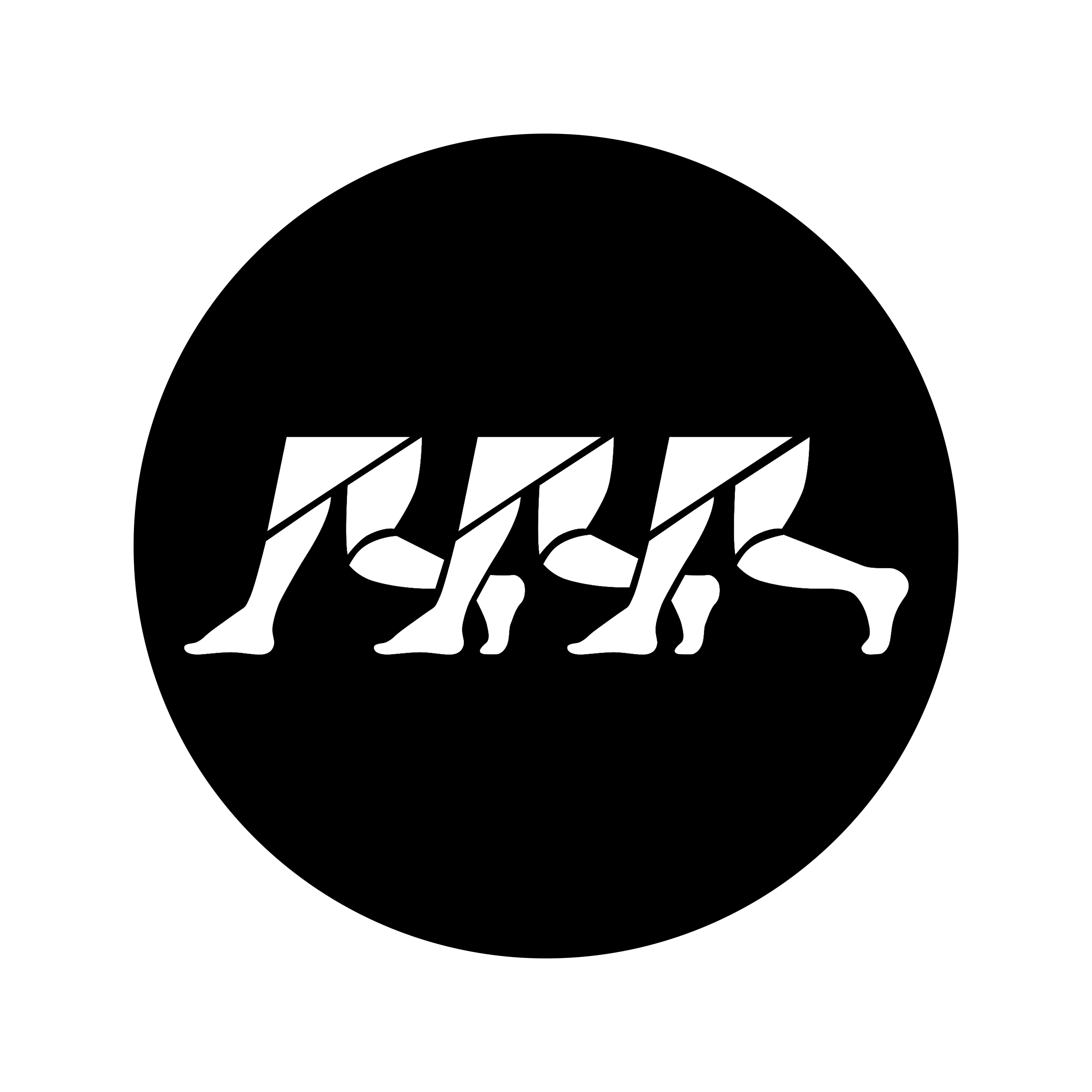
- Founded: 2016
- Founder: Alex Ives & Joseph Summers
- Distributor: Republic Of Music
- Genre: ambient, electronica, experimental, drone, jazz, modern composition, sound art
- Country of origin: United Kingdom
- Location: London
- Official website: www.firstterracerecords.com

First Terrace Records is an independent record label founded in 2016 by Alex Ives & Joseph Summers.

First Terrace release music covering ambient, electronica, experimental, drone, jazz, modern composition & sound art. First Terrace have released music from artists such as Specimens, K. Leimer and Peter Broderick project The Beacon Sound Choir - 'Sunday Songs' also featuring Machinefabriek.

== Label philosophy ==
The name of the label and logo are inspired by Dante's Divine Comedy and the first level in Purgatorio. Depicting the souls of the proud bent over by the weight of stones on their backs in the face of sculptures expressing humility, the opposite virtue to pride which serves as an ethos for the label to remain humble.

The original First Terrace logo was sketched by co-founder Alex Ives and is present on only one record, Specimens - 'Sculptures' LP. Following this a refined version was used on all releases up until 2020 when the label introduced a new version of the logo which is present to this day. Consistent throughout all versions of the logo are the legs (of the proud) which symbolise holding up the weight of pride & thus a reminder to remain humble in your work.

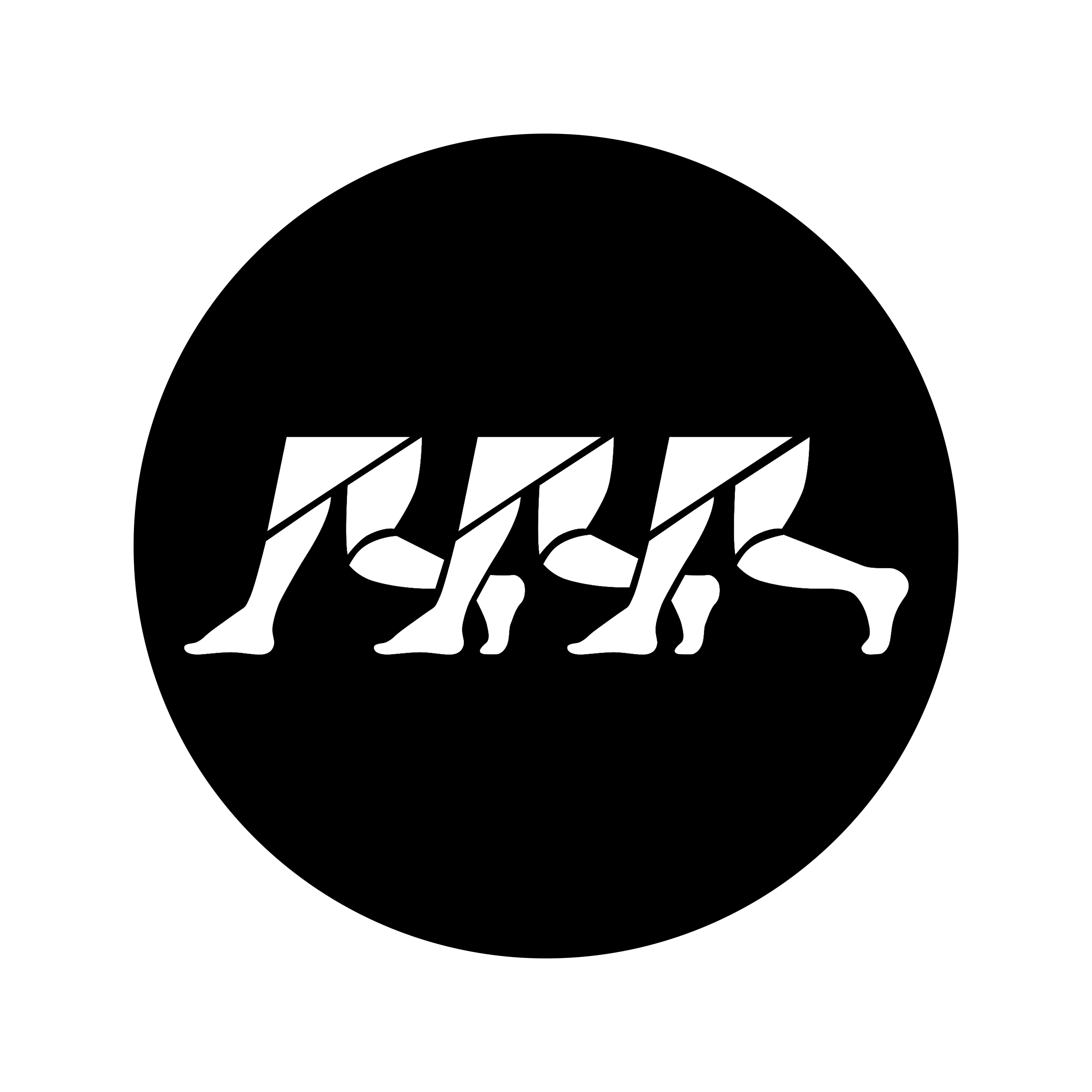
The third iteration of the logo which first appeared on the Sofheso album 'A Record' in 2020 but was officially adopted in 2021

== Artists ==
List of artists First Terrace Records have released records for:

- Anna Homler
- Ben Vince & Jacob Samuel
- Bianca Scout
- Bora
- Chihei Hatakeyama
- Holland Andrews (Like A Villain)
- Justin Wright
- K. Leimer
- Machinefabriek
- NikNak
- Otis Mensah
- Peter Broderick (Beacon Sound Choir)
- Pierre Bastien
- Sofheso
- Sunik Kim
- Specimens
- Vida Vojić

== See also ==
List of record labels
