= Shipwreck Radio =

Shipwreck Radio Volume One

Studio album by Nurse with Wound
- Released: 2004–2006
- Recorded: 2004
- Genre: Experimental
- Label: ICR
- Producers: Steven Stapleton, Colin Potter

Nurse with Wound chronology
Angry Eelectric Finger (2004)	Shipwreck Radio Volume One (2004)	Echo Poeme Sequence No. 2 (2005)

Shipwreck Radio Volume Two
- the second 2CD set

Shipwreck Radio is a series of albums by Nurse with Wound documenting their residency in Lofoten, Norway during June and July 2004. Invited to stay in the unofficial capital, fishing village Svolvær, Steven Stapleton and Colin Potter were commissioned to produce 3 radio broadcasts per week for local station Lofotradioen of music constructed from whatever they heard or could find around the island. The project was instigated by Anne Hilde Neset and Rob Young of The Wire and by Kunst I Nordland, an organisation committed to bringing contemporary art to the county of Nordland.

The duo created 24 broadcasts in total, each of either 15 or 30 minutes duration. Each broadcast was preceded by a jingle of a male voice saying "Velkommen Til Utvær" followed by a female voice saying the English translation "Welcome To Utvær", Utvær being the most remote island in Lofoten, with no permanent residents but 2 lighthouse keepers on hand. Many of the broadcasts treated or manipulated the two introductory voices with one consisting of nothing but such manipulations. 20 of these transmissions have been made available by Nurse with Wound across a number of separate releases with all tracks listed only by the date of original broadcast.

== Shipwreck Radio Volume One ==
A double CD issued on Colin Potter's own ICR label. The release is subtitled "Seven Sonic Structures From Utvær". It was issued in November 2004.

Disc One

1. "June 15" – 16:01
2. "June 17" – 30:39
3. "July 24" – 15:22

Disc Two

1. "June 5" – 15:13
2. "July 6" – 15:02
3. "June 3" – 15:57
4. "June 20" – 15:26

An initial run of 150 copies came with a third disc entitled Lofoten Deadhead.

1. "July 8" – 14:51
2. "June 5" – 30:02
3. "July 10" – 15:08

June 5 mostly consists of untreated recordings of Stapleton and Potter walking around their environs recording basic sounds for use.

== Shipwreck Radio Volume Two ==
A second double CD, again issued on ICR. The release is subtitled "Eight Enigmatic Episodes from Utvær". It was released in November 2005.

Disc One

1. "June 12" – 14:52
2. "June 9" – 15:28
3. "July 4" – 15:02
4. "July 21" – 15:33

Disc Two

1. "July 18" – 16:29
2. "June 6" – 15:35
3. "July 28" – 15:03
4. "June 19" – 14:35

An initial run of 250 copies came with a third disc entitled Gulls Just Wanna Have Fun. Tracks 5, 8 and 10 begin with the "Welcome to Utvær" jingle, but due to a lack of dating on the packaging, it is unknown if these were actual broadcasts or simply outtakes. The shorter pieces are sound experiments.

1. untitled – 0:59
2. untitled – 15:58
3. untitled – 1:09
4. untitled – 0:56
5. untitled – 9:34
6. untitled – 0:40
7. untitled – 0:55
8. untitled – 14:49
9. untitled – 2:20
10. untitled – 14:20
11. untitled – 15:00
12. untitled – 3:14

== Shipwreck Radio: Final Broadcasts ==
This is a single disc, issued by ICR in June 2006, initially sold at NWW's live performances in San Francisco.

1. "June 22" – 30:18
2. "July 13" – 30:29
