= To the Quiet Men from a Tiny Girl =

Studio album by Nurse with Wound
- Released: 1980
- Recorded: January 1980
- Genres: Industrial, experimental
- Length: 50:57
- Label: United Dairies
- Producer: The Bombay Ducks

Nurse with Wound chronology
| Chance Meeting on a Dissecting Table of a Sewing Machine and an Umbrella (1979) | To the Quiet Men from a Tiny Girl (1980) | Merzbild Schwet (1980) |

Professional ratings
Review scores
| Source | Rating |
|---|---|
| AllMusic | 4/5 stars |

To the Quiet Men from a Tiny Girl is the second album by Nurse with Wound and the last to be made by the founding trio of Steven Stapleton, John Fothergill, and Heman Pathak. The album also features contributions from French avant-garde musician Jacques Berrocal. It was recorded by The Bombay Ducks, an alias for Nicky Rogers and Vic Ball, the former of whom had facilitated the recording of the group's first album, Chance Meeting on a Dissecting Table of a Sewing Machine and an Umbrella (and, therefore, unintentionally, the group's formation - see article for details). The album's title comes from the dedication inside the LP Anonym by Tolerance. link

The sessions were characterised by tension amongst the trio with Pathak leaving the group almost immediately after the album was completed - Fothergill told author David Keenan that Pathak's contribution to this record was minimal. Stapleton and Fothergill disagreed over the production of She Alone Hole And Open (named after a line from "Pini Pini" by Arto/Neto) and Stapleton has expressed regret at allowing the track to be compromised by Fothergill's intervention. Before long, Fothergill would also leave the group as he and Stapleton began to clash over the releases on the group's United Dairies label, which was now issuing music by other artists such as Whitehouse and the Lemon Kittens.

The album was dedicated to Viennese actionist Rudolf Schwarzkogler, with the explanation that he "killed himself in the name of art through successive acts of self mutilation". This is actually incorrect; Schwarzkogler jumped (or fell) from a 4th story window. Within weeks of completing this album, Stapleton returned to the studio without Fothergill or Pathak to create the following Nurse with Wound release on his own.

Like its predecessor, To the Quiet Men... was issued in a hand numbered edition of 500 and, yet again, Stapleton provided the sleeve artwork. Each copy contained an expanded edition of the Nurse with Wound list. It was also released on cassette and later reissued on vinyl as part of the Psilotripitaka box set. A CD edition was also released in 1990. It was also bootlegged, with all such copies being numbered 211/500 . Two vinyl reissues were released both on United Dirter (red vinyl) and Cargo Records (yellow vinyl) in 2019.

== Track listing ==
All tracks are written by Steven Stapleton, John Fothergill and Heman Pathak.

Side one
| No. | Title | Length |
|---|---|---|
| 1. | "Umbrella Link" | 1:20 |
| 2. | "She Alone Hole and Open" | 25:05 |

Side two
| No. | Title | Length |
|---|---|---|
| 1. | "Ostranenie" | 27:15 |

== Album artwork ==
The album's artwork was done by Stapleton. The front cover includes a central figure wrapped in bandages and cut by razor blades, a reference to visual documentations of the performances arranged by Schwarzkogler, which may have involved models other than himself. The back cover depicts repeated open-mouthed, bloodied heads, referring to a famous shot from the Sergei Eisenstein film The Battleship Potemkin.
