= Anna Homler =

American visual, performance, and vocal artist

Anna Homler (born November 1, 1948, in Los Angeles, California) is a visual, performance, and vocal artist living and working in Los Angeles. She has performed music and exhibited her artworks in venues around the world. She earned a B.A. at the University of California, Berkeley, 1970, in Anthropology, and an M.A. in Education and Languages at Boston University, 1973. She graduated from Alexander Hamilton High School, Los Angeles.

== Career ==
In 1989, Homler was part of the Direct Sound project which took Homler to Europe with the musical performance group organized by avant-garde vocalist David Moss and including vocalists Shelley Hirsch, Carles Santos and Greetje Bijma; they performed at the Taktlos Festival in Switzerland as well as several other venues in Europe. Homler participated in many music festivals in Europe including Milanopoesia in Milan, Italy, the Festival International des Musiques Actuelle, Nancy, France, and the LMC Annual Festival of Experimental Music, South Bank, London.

John Payne wrote in the L.A. Weekly "Anna Homler, L.A.-based but not often heard locally (she's a popular-in-Europe type), sings, in an invented language that 'nobody knows but everyone understands,' and plays a nice little assortment of wind-up clocks, toys and other mechanical doodads; her output is filtered through electronic devices..."

In Option Dean Suzuki wrote: "Homler is a Los Angeles-based performance artist in whose work art plays a central role. In all of her work, Homler creates a persona who expresses herself in a newley invented language that appears to be rife with tradition, ritual, ceremony and a culture all its own. The language is couched in lyrical and somewhat exotic melodies sung with a pure vocal style sans vibrato, which gives the work an ambience of authentic folk tradition" .

In 1982, while driving through Topanga Canyon in her '61 Caddy, Anna Homler experienced and auto-epiphany: "I began spontaneously singing and chanting in a language I'd never heard before--word and rhythm were one." This experience...prompted her to create an ancient, storytelling character named "Breadwoman" who...earned Homler acclaim as a "linguistic alchemist."

Kateri Butler continues in an article in the L.A. Weekly, "Like the French deconstructionist movement, Anna transcends the mere word: 'I deal with the poetic, which releases us from the narrowness of our perceptions'."

Homler's assemblage work has been included in a number of museum exhibitions, including 40 Years of California Assemblage, organized by the UCLA Frederick Wight Art Gallery at UCLA, which traveled to the San Jose Museum of Art, San Jose, Calif., Fresno Art Museum, Fresno, Calif. and the Joslyn Art Museum, Omaha, Nebraska. Her work was also included in the exhibition Outside the Frame, Performance and the Object: A Survey History of Performance Art in the USA since 1950, at the Cleveland Center for Contemporary Art, 1994, Cleveland, Ohio.

== Pharmacia Poetica ==
"She created Pharmacia Poetica '87, an ongoing installation and performance project exploring the tonal and symbolic properties of words and objects..."

In Wire, Ed Baxter writes that Homler's "style suits today's cut-and-paste aesthetic, but is perhaps rooted more firmly in the confrontational caberet and framed detritus of Kurt Schwitters, the pranks of Fluxus, the assemblages of Joseph Cornell, even the outré inventories of Charles Fort." . "Pharmacia Poetica...an installation project started in 1987 and which contains an apothecary's room which displays the stuff of dreams rather than pills. The project's motto is 'For every malady, there's a melody." Its subject is the examination of the symbolic and tonal quality of words and objects."

Since 1987, Pharmacia Poetica, Homler's

...library of glass bottles rather than books, the "Pharmacia" is a reliquary of the easily overlooked and unnoticed. Mysterious organic substances along with obsolete materials and artifacts reside in deeply hued ambient fluids. Plant-like fibers and filaments are as illusory as memories floating on the edge of consciousness. Other vessels include recognizable objects--magnetic cassette tape, typewriter erasing ribbon, wooden blocks with letters, fragments of untranslatablr language in liquid elixirs. The bottles come in various shapes and sizes; several contain tiny bottles inside larger ones like little sunken vessels.

"...Anna Homler has set up shop, a pseudo-apothecary that caters to the spirit more than the body. The L. A. -based performance and visual artist launched her 'Pharmacia Poetica' project 10 years ago in the form of a radio play and storefront exhibition. It has since traveled widely, evolving, expanding and contracting according to the circumstances of each venue."

In 2011 Homler had an exhibition of Pharmacia Poetica installed at the Den Contemporary Art gallery at the Pacific Design Center, Los Angeles. Lisa Derrick writes about the show in the Huffington Post, "Born in to a family of pharmacists, artist Anna Homler took a different route to her life to provide succor using ethereal, transcendent art forms to heal the psyche..."

== Performance Art ==
=== Breadwoman ===
Breadwoman was a performance art character developed by Homler in 1982. Her costume included a face covered with a loaf of bread.

In a series of performances, the artist wears a mask of dough and peasant clothes as she sings shamanistic incantations in an inventive language that is at once playful and mysterious.

In a 1997 interview with The Wire, Homler explained, "I think of English as lettuce and my own language as bread. Bread Woman was a character from my performance art days, an ancient storyteller with a huge loaf on her head. Decked in dough or not, Anna Homler likes to tell unusual stories, to reclaim the strangeness of communication 'through celestial voices.'"

=== The Whale ===
...a Homler family relic: the immense--indeed as she puts it, womblike--turquoise 1960 Cadillac Homler inherited from her aunt and uncle, and in which she floated through life until coming into a more practical vehicle. But Homler could not simply give up or destroy The Whale, as she called it; like any good artist, she made an installation out of it. The transformation is appropriately aquatic, right down to the ambient sound and typically Homlerian barrier reef of personal artifacts.

"The Whale's first art incarnation was in an installation/performance at Espace DBD, December 11, 1981, in which we were taken in groups of four or five from an 'underwater' grotto waiting room replete with live mermaids and lots of fish food, on a magical mystery tour in the newly transformed Whale car, chauffeured by Homler through Cheviot Hills."

On the outside, Homler's Whale is a resplendent shimmering turquoise beast with huge tail fins that suggest both a rocket ship and an oversized creature of the sea, be it mechanical or mammalian. Enter the belly of the beast and we are transported into an underwater piscean realm that is both mythic and magical, a temple of the deep decorated with tiny buddhas, seashells, aquatic creatures, and seaweed drapery. Apple "Calls from the Deep."

== Voice ==
In 2012, Anna Homler and Sylvia Hallett released the album The Many Moods of Bread and Shed, (Orchestra Pit Records).

Anna Homler and Sylvia Hallett have so much in common that there's a certain inevitability to their coming together as a duo. Originally a vocalist, albeit a startling alien and surreal one, Homler has expanded her palette by deploying an extraordinary selection of toys, gadgets and gizmos to complement and alter her voice.

On The Many Moods of Bread and Shed, (The Orchestra Pit Recordings) made by Homler with London based violinist and multi-instrumentalist Sylvia Hallett, you can hear the dedication to...everyday magic. This is music that's involved with amusement, enchantment and adventures close to home. It's unassuming in scope, playful in spirit and entirely refreshing.

"Anna Homler is an experimental vocalist. [On House of Hands,] Homler whispers and seduces with her voice, and the electronics state an eerie case on this unusually crafted recording. It is disconcertingly bewitching."

In a significant 1989 performance event sponsored by German painter and musician A. R Penck in Heimbach, Germany, Homler participated in Ost und West, with a number of European musicians and artists. In 1997, she was included in Vox, an (Nicht nur Nicht) album featuring ten tracks by ten German composers, and performers from the experimental scene.

"With ears wide open, Homler haunts toy shops, hardware stores, and thrift shops, ever on the prowl for all manner of noise-makers, sonic gizmos, and other potential instruments." Dean Suzuki continues his review in Musicworks, "Homler's texts are based mostly on an invented language of her own. Using a vocal delivery that is part little girl, part old woman, and an intangible something else which involves a non-Western tribal community, her songs suggest something primal, communal, earthy; yet they are also imbued with mystery, ritual, even magic."

Homler has collaborated in the USA and Europe with a number of notable composers and musicians including, in Europe, the Voices of Kwahn, Steve Beresford, Pavel Fajt, Peter Kowald, Frank Schulte, Richard Sanderson, Geert Waegeman, and Sylvia Hallett; and in the USA with Steve Moshier, David Moss (musician), Ethan James, Steve Roden, and Steve Peters. She appears with free jazz musicians included in Off the Road (2007), a documentary film made by Laurence Petit-Jouvet about a United States tour in 2000 with German musician Peter Kowald.

== Recent works ==
In 2012, Anna Homler and Sylvia Hallett released the album The Many Moods of Bread and Shed (The Orchestra Pit). Also among her recent projects, Homler's installation artwork was the subject of a 2010 documentary, M'Bo Ye' Ye, (composed with Geert Waegeman) by Los Angeles filmmaker Jane Cantillon about the Pharmacia Poetica. The Heart of No Place (2009), an independent film by Rika Ohara based on the life of Yoko Ono, includes music by Anna Homler and Bernard Sauser-Hall. She is included in Kate Crash's current interactive documentary created with EZTV’s Michael Masucci. The film, LA Woman, (2011) premiered as part of the Pacific Standard Time initiative sponsored by the Getty Research Institute. It screened at the Armory Center for the Arts in Pasadena, California.

== Discography ==
- Anna Homler and Steve Moshier: Breadwoman,, Pharmacia Poetica, 1985
- Five Voices: Direct Sound. (Greetje Bijma, Shelley Hirsch, Anna Homler, David Moss, and Carles Santos), Intakt, 1989
- Radio Tokyo Tapes, Volume 4: Women, (Vinyl LP), Chameleon Records, 1989
- Anna Homler: Dō Ya Sa' Di Dō, subtitled: A Sonic Geography, with Ethan James, Steve Moshier, David Moss, and Bernard Sauser-Hall, AMF, 1992
- Voices of Kwahn: Rebirth. (Nigel Butler, Mark Davies, and Anna Homler), Max-Built, 1993
- Sugarconnection: Plays Alien Cakes. (Anna Homler, Frank Schulte, and Axel Otto), No Man's Land, 1994
- Macaronic Sines. (Pavel Fajt, Anna Homler, and Geert Waegeman), Lowlands, 1995
- Voices of Kwahn: Silver Bowl Transmission (Anna Homler and The Pylon King [aka Mark Davies]), North South Records, 1996
- Voices of Kwahn: Peninsular Enclosure (Anna Homler and The Pylon King [aka Mark Davies]), Swarf Finger Records, 1997
- Corne de Vache (Pavel Fajt, Anna Homler, and Geert Waegeman with Koen Van Roy), Victo, 1997
- Voices of Kwahn: Operation Dismantled Sun (Anna Homler and The Pylon King [aka Mark Davies]), Swarf Finger Records, 1998
- House of Hands (Viola Kramer, Steve Roden, Nadine Bal & Alain Neffe, and Lyn Norton), ND, 2000
- Puppetina: Piewacket! subtitled: Puppetina plays Pasha Ninateen (Anna Homler and Stephanie Payne), Pasha Nina Teen Recordings, 2001
- The Chopstick Sisters: l'une bouge, l'autre pas ... (Nadine Bal, Anna Homler, and Alain Neffe), 3patttes, 2004
- Homler/Liebig Duo: Kelpland Serenades (Anna Homler and Steuart Liebig), pfMENTUM, 2005
- Drift: Bypass Thru the Sky (Anna Homler, Brad Cooper, Randy Greif, and Atom Smith), Swinging Axe, 2007
- The Many Moods of Bread and Shed: Anna Homler and Sylvia Hallett, The Orchestra Pit, 2012
- Anna Homler and Steve Moshier - Breadwoman & Other Tales, RVNG Intl., 2016
- Anna Homler, Adrian Northover & Dave Tucker (TRIO) / Pierre Bastien Split 12" First Terrace Records, 2018

== Sources ==
Apple, Jacki, "Anna Homler: Pharmacia Poetica," THE Magazine, September, 2008
Apple, Jacki, "Calls from the Deep: Anna Homler's 'Whale' symbolizes the foibles of a decade," Artweek, March 1, 1990
Baxter, Ed, "Anna Homler: Scaling Babel," The Wire, 1997
Brentano, Robyn and Olivia Georgia, Outside the Frame, Performance and the Object: A Survey History of Performance Art in the USA since 1950, Cleveland Center for Contemporary Art, Cleveland, Ohio, August, 1994
Clarke, Donald, ed. The Penguin Encyclopedia of Popular Music, Second Edition, London, 1998
Cowley, Julian, "Anna Homler and Sylvia Hallett: The Many Moods of Bread and Shed," The Wire, May, 2012
Derrick, Lisa, Anna Homler's Pharmacia Poetica at D.E.N. Contemporary, Huffpost Arts & Culture," Huffington Post," October 8, 2011
Frank, Peter, "Whale Power," L. A. Weekly, December 8–14, 1989
LaRiviere, Anne, "Feminist Artists to Mark Halloween", Los Angeles Times, October, 1983
Ollman, Leah, "The Spirit Shop," Los Angeles Times, November 28, 1998
Payne, John, "Experimental Pick of the Week: Anna Homler, Steve Peters, Steve Roden," L. A. Weekly, January 26-February 1, 1996
Suzuki, Dean, "Anna Homler: Do Ya Sa Di Do: A Sonic Geography," OPTION Music Alternatives, July–August, 1993
Suzuki, Dean, "Noise Toys and Voice: Anna Homler: House of Hands," Musicworks, Winter, 2002
Wight Art Gallery, Forty Years of California Assemblage: Exhibition Catalog, University of California, Los Angeles, 1989
