= Brumm (surname) =

Brumm is a surname. Notable people with the surname include:

- Charles N. Brumm (1838–1917), American politician
- Don Brumm (born 1941), American football player
- Fred Brumm (1877–1936), American football player
- George F. Brumm (1880–1934), American politician
- Leonard Brumm (1926–2006), American ice hockey player
- Roman Brumm (1898–1981), American football player
