= Emmanuelle Parrenin =

French singer and instrumentalist

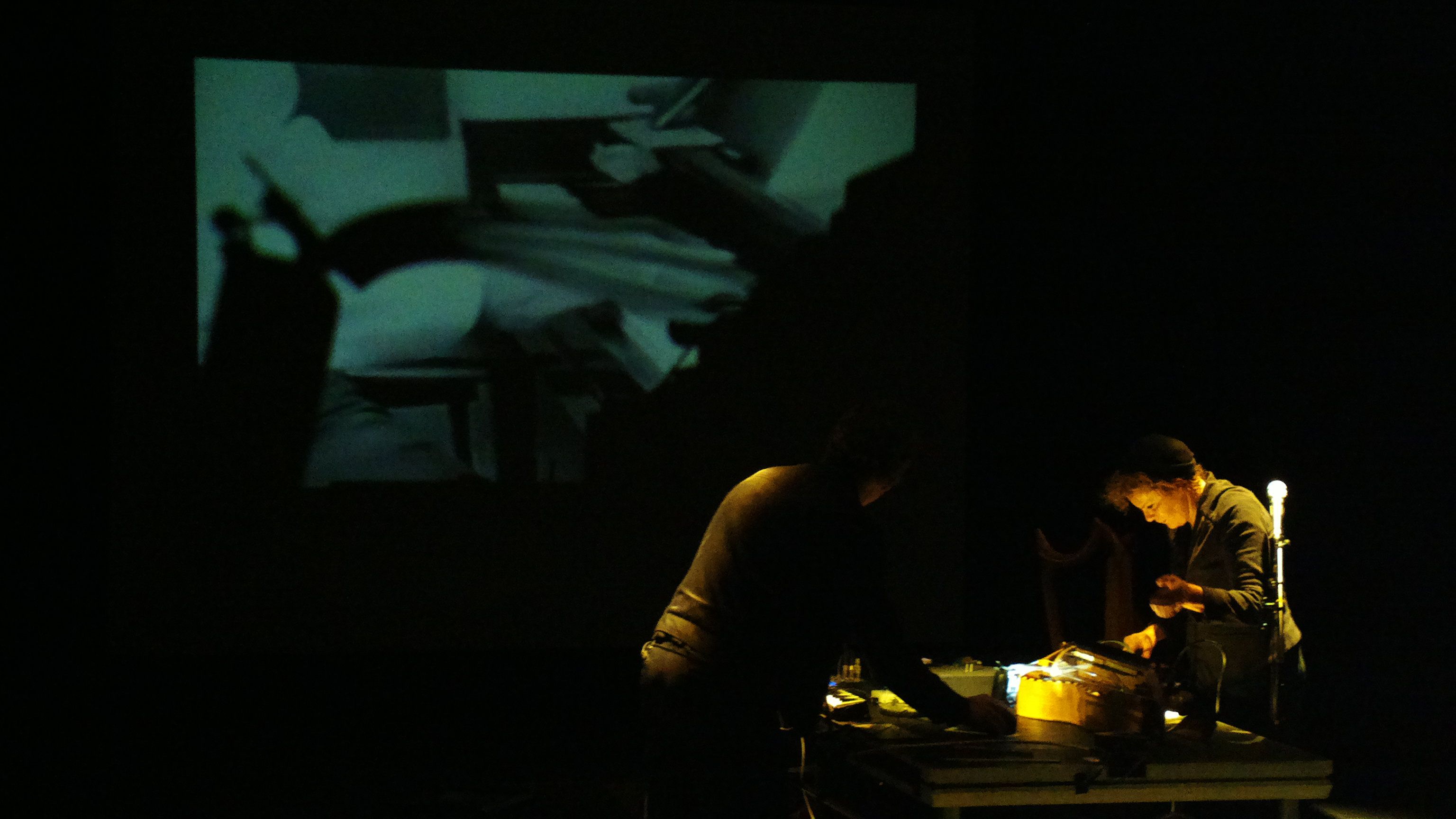
MOTUS POCUS by Pierre Bastien and Emmanuelle Parrenin at Théâtre Berthelot in Montreuil, Seine-Saint-Denis

Emmanuelle Parrenin is a French folk singer, harpist and hurdy-gurdy player who was first active in the late 1960s and 1970s as part of "le mouvement folk".

== Early life and education ==
Parrenin was born into a family steeped in classical music: her mother played the harp and her father the violin, and studied ballet as child. She attended a Catholic boarding school but was expelled. She expanded her musical horizons during her teenage years, and was influenced by meeting Eric Clapton and The Yardbirds, during a visit to England while a teenager.

At age 19, she met the hurdy-gurdy player Christian Leroy Gour'han, René Zosso, and Alan Stivell at Le Bourbon folk club. The instrument itself made a deep impression on her and made her determined to learn how to perform with it. She and others travelled to remote regions of France and other Francophone countries including Canada to record folksongs. The recordings were donated to the Musée de l'Homme and the Musée National des Arts et Traditions Populaires.

== Career ==
In 1974 Parrenin released an album with Phil Fromont called "La Maurmariée", developing a "reputation for stark and intelligent interpretations of traditional music."

By the mid-1970s Parrenin had gained a reputation with traditional and folk music. With Fromont and Claude Lefebvre, Parrenin released a second, more progressive, album "Chateau Dans Les Nuages" in 1976, with included "Eastern elements and general strangeness".

Her only solo album, "Maison Rose" was released in 1977. The title refers to the house she grew up in, and the musical influences she imbibed there. The album took "the revived instruments of le mouvement folk out into new territory". Apart from Plume Blanche, Plume Noire by Jean-Claude Vannier, she wrote all the works and developed the album with engineer Bruno Menny. The album was re-released in 2001 and developed an international cult following.

After the album's release, Parrenin moved away from folk music. She later explained "It was a time when, firstly, it [folk music] was becoming very fashionable and there wasn't the same spirit as there had been at the beginning. There was a lot of what we call in France 'un esprit de chapelle'; it was very purist and I don't think I'm like that. I liked it when it felt alive, and when that went I was bored." She began writing music for contemporary dance, including for Carolyn Carlson, and returned to dancing. She also taught herself to play the harp.

By 1981 she had formed a group that included Didier Malherbe of prog rockers Gong. They were a support act for The Clash at Le Zénith arena in Paris in 1981 and did not appreciate the violence of the punk audience.

In 1993, a fire damaged her hearing, and she was no longer able to perform. Told that she had lost her hearing permanently, she moved to the Alps, and as self-therapy she began playing and singing again. As her hearing improved she used the techniques she had learned with others including with people with autism and psychiatric disorders.

In March 2011 Parrenin released a new album, "Maison Cube". in collaboration with singer/songwriter Flóp and Jaumet. The title refers to the cube-shaped house where it was recorded.

In 2019 and 2020 she collaborated with Detlef Weinreich, (who works as the producer Tolouse Low Trax) to produce the album Jours de Grève (Strike Days) inspired by recent French general strikes.
