= Pascal Comelade =

French musician

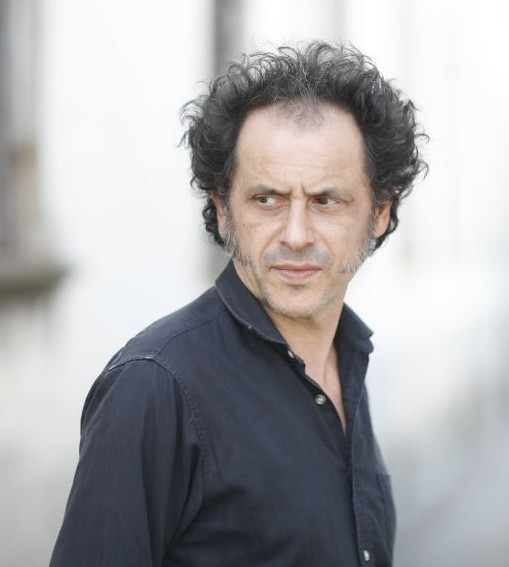
Pascal Comelade

Pascal Paul Vincent Comelade (born 30 June 1955), is a French musician.

Comelade was born in Montpellier, France. After living for several years in Barcelona, he produced his first album, Fluence, influenced by electronic music and by the group Heldon.

Subsequently, his music has become more acoustic and is characterised by the sounds of toy instruments, used as solo-instruments and as an integral part of the sound of his group, the Bel Canto Orquestra.

He has collaborated with singers and musicians from diverse genres of music including Robert Wyatt, Dani, Faust, Christophe Miossec, Toti Soler, Jac Berrocal, Pierre Bastien, The Limiñanas, Lee Ranaldo and P.J. Harvey.

== Discography ==
- 1975 : Fluence
- 1978 :
  - Séquences Paiennes
  - Vertical Pianos
- 1980 :
  - Paralelo
  - Ready-Made
- 1981 : Slow Musics
- 1982 :
  - Sentimientos
  - Irregular Organs
- 1983 :
  - Fall Of Saigon
  - Logique du Sens
- 1984 :
  - La Dialectique Peut-Elle Casser des Briques ? (with Cathy Claret's voice).
  - Bel Canto Orquestra
  - Milano Enharmonisto
  - Précis de Décomposition Bruitiste
  - Scénes de Musique Ralentie
  - Détail Monochrome
- 1986 : Bel Canto
- 1987 : El Primitivismo
- 1988 :
  - Impressionnismes
  - Rock Del Veneno
- 1989 :
  - 33 Bars
  - Cent Regards
- 1991 :
  - Ragazzin' The Blues
  - Pataphysical Polka
  - Haikus de Pianos
- 1992 :
  - Traffic d'Abstraction
  - Topographie Anecdotique
  - El Ermitaño - with Bel Canto Orquestra
- 1993 : Yo Quiero Un Tebeo
- 1994 : Danses Et Chants de Syldavie (Apologie de la reprise individuelle)
- 1995 : El Cabaret Galactic
- 1996 :
  - Musiques Pour Films Vol.2
  - Tango Del Rossello
  - Un samedi Sur la Terre - Soundtrack
- 1997 :
  - Un Tal Jazz
  - Oblique Sessions - with Pierre Bastien, Jac Berrocal and Jaki Liebezeit
- 1998 :
  - L'Argot du Bruit (with PJ Harvey)
  - ZumZum.Ka
  - Bel Canto Orquestra In Concerto
- 1999 :
  - Musiques De Genre
  - Live In Lisbon and Barcelona
  - Oblique Sessions II - with Richard Pinhas
  - Swing Slang Song
- 2000 :
  - Aigua de Florida Classes de Música a la Granja - with Llorenç Balsach
  - André Le Magnifique - Soundtrack (followed by 3 pieces written for the ballet "Spring man" by Ryohei Kondo and 6 pieces written for the ballet "Zumzum-ka" by Cesc Gelabert.)
  - September Song - with Robert Wyatt
  - Pop Songs Del Rossello - with Gérard Jacquet
  - Pastis Catalan - Music for the Musée d'Art moderne de Céret (Limited Edition of 50 copies signed and numbered.)
- 2001 :
  - La Isla Del Holandés - with José Manuel Pagan
  - Pop Songs Del Rossello 2 - with Gérard Jacquet
- 2002 :
  - Sense el Resso del Dring
  - Psicotic Music' Hall
- 2003 :
  - Logicofobisme del Piano en Minuscul
  - Musica Pop (Danses de Catalunya Nord)
- 2004 :
  - La Filosofia del Plat Combinat
  - Back to Schizo 1975-1983
- 2005 : Espace Détente - Soundtrack
- 2006
  - Espontex sinfonia
  - La Manera Més Salvatge - with Enric Casasses
  - Stranger In Paradigm
- 2007 : Mètode de Rocanrol
- 2008
  - Compassió pel dimoni
  - The No-Dancing
- 2009
  - A Freak Serenade (Because) / Friki Serenata (Discmedi)
- 2010
  - Montpellier - with Gérard Pansanel and Pep Pascual
  - N'ix - with Enric Casasses
- 2011
  - Pascal Comelade & Cobla Sant Jordi - with the Cobla Sant Jordi
  - Somiatruites - with Albert Pla
- 2013
  - Flip Side (Of Sophism) - with Richard Pinhas
  - El pianista del antifaz
  - Mosques de colors - with Pau Riba
  - Despintura fonica
  - Avis aux inventeurs d'épaves - Book of 166 Comelade paintings with two 7" singles
- 2014
  - My Degeneration: Electronics 1974-1983
  - Música Pop a Catalunya
  - Música Electrònica a Catalunya Nord
  - El Steinway a la Guillotina (Bel Canto Orquestra en Directe)
- 2015
  - Traité de guitarres triolectiques
  - Concepte General De La Quincalla Catalana
  - L'argot del soroll
  - El Primitivisme
- 2016
  - Rocanrolorama 1974 - 2016
- 2017
  - Le Rocanrolorama Abrégé
  - Paralelo
- 2019
  - Les mémoires d'un ventriloque (Chansons 1981-2018)
- 2020
  - Le cut-up populaire
- 2022
  - Le non-sens du rythme
- 2023
  - Velvet Serenade - with Ramon Prats and Lee Ranaldo
  - Boom Boom - with The Limiñanas
