= Nurse with Wound =

British experimental band

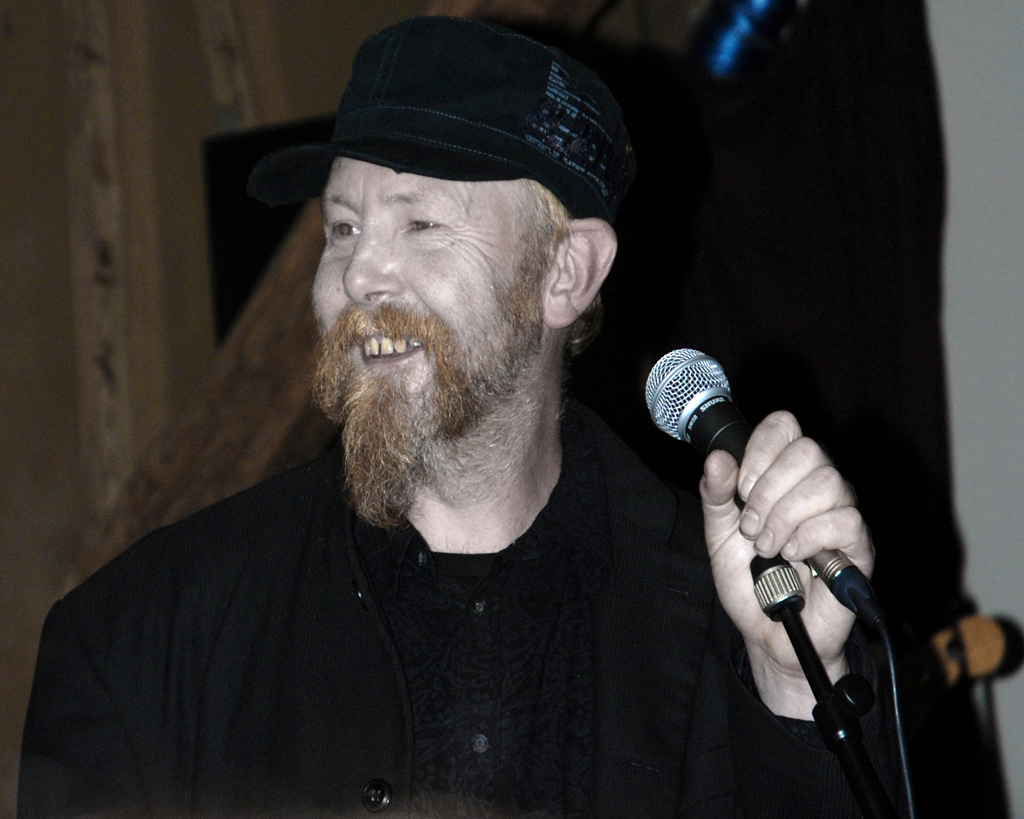
- Steven Stapleton live with Nurse with Wound at Avantgarde Festival 2008, Schiphorst

Background information
- Origin: London, United Kingdom
- Genres: Experimental; industrial; avant-garde; dark ambient; noise; drone
- Years active: 1978–present
- Labels: United Dairies; Rotorelief; Third Mind; Durtro; Durtro Jnana; Beta-lactam Ring; Red Wharf
- Members: Steven Stapleton
- Past members: Heman Pathak; John Fothergill; Colin Potter
- Website: nursewithwound.co.uk rotorelief.com/nurse-with-wound/

Nurse with Wound (abbreviated NWW) is the main recording name for British musician Steven Stapleton. Nurse with Wound was originally a band, formed in 1978 by Stapleton, John Fothergill and Heman Pathak. The band's work has explored genres such as industrial, noise, dark ambient, and drone.

== Musical output ==
Their early recordings, all made quickly, were heavily influenced by free improvisation and krautrock and were generally considered industrial music, despite the objections of the group.

By 1981, only Stapleton was left from the original trio and he now regards 1982's Homotopy to Marie as being the first proper Nurse with Wound release. There are now over 40 full length NWW titles. Stapleton's fondness for dada, surrealism and absurdist humor are demonstrated in much of NWW's output, which, though it draws directly on a wide assortment of genres (including cabaret music, nursery rhymes, John Cage, The Beach Boys, krautrock, ambient music, and easy listening), retains a distinctive and recognizable aura. Musique concrète may be the most prominent touchstone due to Stapleton's frequent, and often humorous, use of creative tape loops and editing. This aesthetic is fully represented in the artwork on the album covers, virtually all of which are created by Stapleton, mostly under the pseudonym "Babs Santini".

== Members ==
Although Stapleton has sole curatorship of NWW, the group has a long list of collaborators including Diana Rogerson, James Thirlwell of Foetus, Tony Wakeford, David Jackman of Organum, Andrew McKenzie of The Hafler Trio, Stereolab, Jim O'Rourke, Christoph Heemann, William Bennett of Whitehouse, Robert Haigh, Rose McDowall of Strawberry Switchblade, Annie Anxiety, John Balance of Coil, Matt Waldron of Irr. App (Ext), and most regularly David Tibet of Current 93. For some time, NWW was a core duo of Stapleton and Colin Potter, the latter having first worked with NWW on 1992's "Thunder Perfect Mind" when it was recorded at Potter's ICR studio. Potter has appeared on almost every NWW release since 1992. In 2009, a CD titled "Ød Lot" was released (credited to Nurse With Wound) which contained solo recordings by Stapleton, Potter, Waldron and Andrew Liles.

== Current work (2005–present) ==
In 2005, the band returned to live performance after a 21-year absence. Stapleton, Potter, Waldron, Rogerson and Andrew Liles played three concerts at the Narrenturm in Vienna, where they performed improvisations on the album Salt Marie Celeste. These concerts were not billed as NWW appearances. The first official NWW appearances since 1984 were at the Great American Music Hall in San Francisco in June 2006. In December of the same year, the group played at the All Tomorrow's Parties festival organized by Thurston Moore. During 2007, Stapleton gigged and DJed with much greater regularity, including a set at experimental music night Stress!! in Galway City, Ireland and full live NWW sets is in Austria, Belgium, France, Barcelona, London, Moscow, Berlin and Venice.

A collaborative work with krautrock band Faust was released on CD in 2007 as Disconnected with a vinyl edition carrying additional mixes following in 2008. Nurse recently joined Faust for the encores during the concert at St. John in Hackney. A NWW album entitled Huffin' Rag Blues, primarily a collaboration with British sound artist Andrew Liles, was issued in 2008 with a companion mini-LP entitled The Bacteria Magnet. A remix of Sunn O)))'s ØØ Void entitled The Iron Soul of Nothing was given a limited release with an expanded reissue of the out-of-print studio album The Man with the Woman Face following. An album of new material entitled The Surveillance Lounge was then released as a CD with a limited triple CD called The Memory Surface. A CD of new material entitled Space Music will be released on 17 November 2009.

A recent collaboration was a result of the chance meeting of Nurse With Wound's Steven Stapleton and Graham Bowers, both artists were appearing at Bangor Sound City's first art/sound event 'Wet Sounds' curated by Joel Cahen located at the Bangor Swimming Pool, North Wales, in January 2011. Both were admirers of each other's past works and felt that a collaboration on a new piece of work could be an interesting and exciting prospect; consequently Rupture was the first full-length work, and was released as a double vinyl album/LP, a CD and download. The vinyl album and CD have been released through Dirter.

They followed up to Rupture with Parade, which was released on the interdisciplinary arts group/record label Red Wharf and distributed by Cargo. The third collaboration, ExcitoToxicity, was released July 2014, and the fourth, Mutation released in March 2015 all through Red Wharf and distributed by Cargo.

== Discography ==
(selected; a full discography can be obtained from the official website—see links below)

All records released on United Dairies, except where indicated.

=== Albums ===
- Chance Meeting on a Dissecting Table of a Sewing Machine and an Umbrella (1979)
- To the Quiet Men from a Tiny Girl (1980)
- Merzbild Schwet (1980)
- Insect and Individual Silenced (1981)
- Homotopy to Marie (1982)
- Ostranenie 1913 (1983)
- Gyllensköld, Geijerstam And I At Rydberg's (1984)
- Brained by Falling Masonry (1984)
- The Sylvie and Babs Hi-Fi Companion (1985)
- Spiral Insana (1986)
- Automating Volume One (1986)
- Scrag! (1987)
- Drunk with the Old Man of the Mountains (1987)
- Alas the Madonna Does Not Function (1988)
- Noise War 4 (1988)
- Soliloquy for Lilith (1988)
- Soliloquy for Lilith (Parts 5 and 6) (1989)
- A Sucked Orange (1989)
- Bar Maldoror (1991)
- Sugar Fish Drink (1992)
- Thunder Perfect Mind (1992)
- Large Ladies With Cake in the Oven (1993)
- Rock 'n Roll Station (1994)
- Who Can I Turn to Stereo (1996)
- An Awkward Pause (1999)
- Alice the Goon (second edition) (2000)
- Funeral Music for Perez Prado (2001)
- Man with the Woman Face (2002)
- Salt Marie Celeste (2003)
- She and Me Fall Together in Free Death (2003)
- The Musty Odour of Pierced Rectums (2003)
- Chance Meeting of a Defective Tape Machine and a Migraine (2003)
- Shipwreck Radio Volume One (2004)
- Echo Poeme: Sequence No. 2 (2005)
- Shipwreck Radio Volume Two (2005)
- Soundpooling (2006)
- Stereo Wastelands (2006)
- Rat Tapes One: An Accumulation of Discarded Musical Vermin 1983–2006 (2006)
- Shipwreck Radio: The Final Broadcasts (2006)
- Huffin' Rag Blues (2008)
- The Surveillance Lounge (2009)
- Space Music (2009)
- Paranoia in HiFi (2009)
- Chromanatron (2013)
- Dark Fat (2016)
- Sombrero Fallout (2017)
- Nerve Junction (2018)
- The Grave and Beautiful Name of Sadness (2024)

=== Collaborative albums ===
- The 150 Murderous Passions (1981)
- In Fractured Silence (1984)
- Nylon Coverin' Body Smotherin' (1984)
- A Missing Sense/Rasa (1986)
- Nurse With Wound and The Hafler Trio Hit Again! (1987)
- Crumb Duck (1993)
- Acts of Senseless Beauty (1997)
- Simple Headphone Mind (1997)
- The Swinging Reflective: Favourite Moments of Mutual Ecstasy (1999)
- Angry Electric Finger (2004)
- Disconnected (2007)
- The Iron Soul of Nothing (2008)
- Erroneous: A Selection of Errors (2010)
- Rupture (2012)
- Cabbalism (2012)
- Parade (2013)
- ExcitoToxicity (2014)
- Mutation (2015)
- Contrary Motion with Scanner (2025)

== See also ==
- Nurse with Wound list
