= Pierre Bastien =

French musician

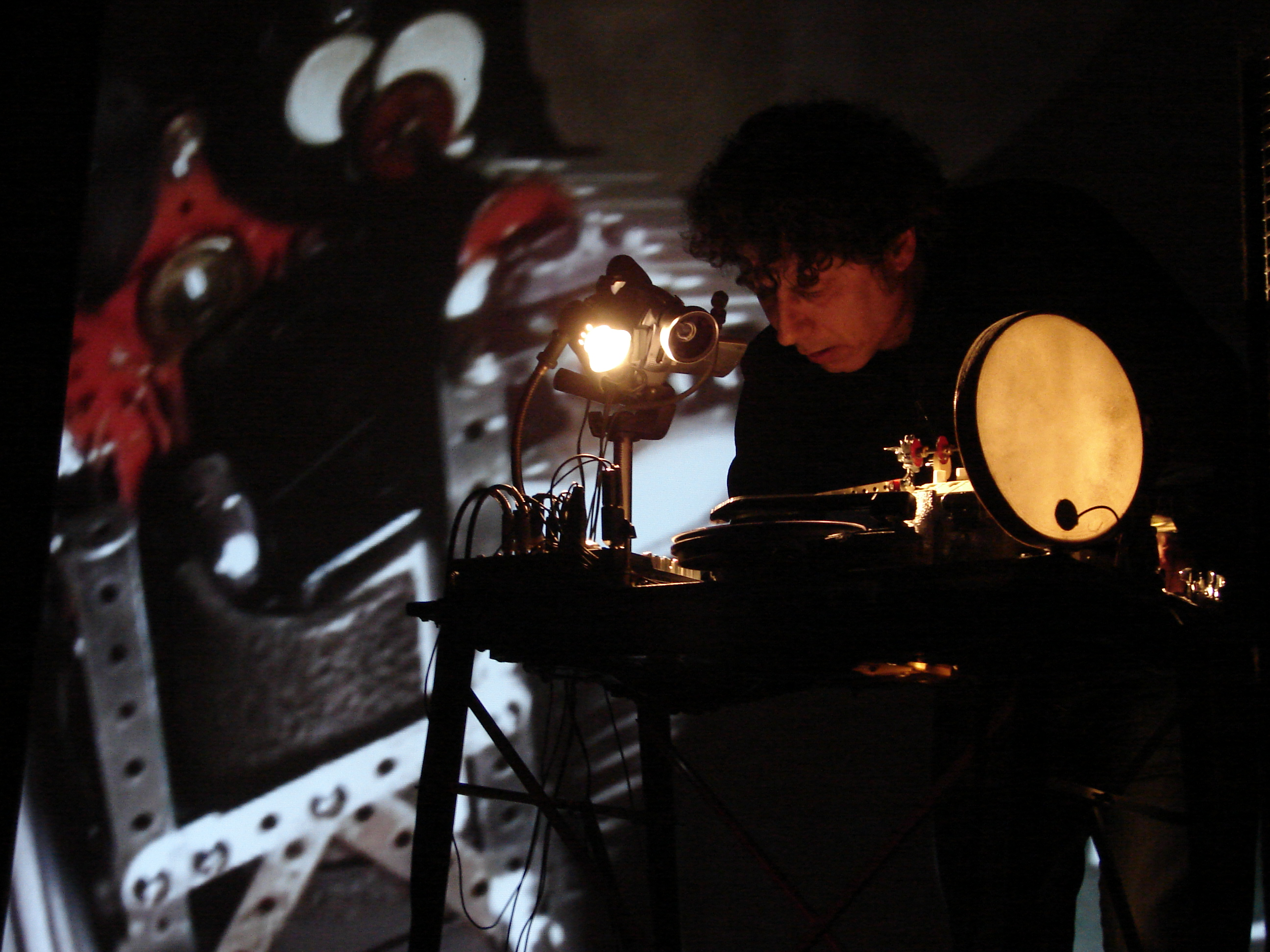
- Pierre Bastien performing live.

Background information
- Born: 1953 (age 71–72); Paris, France
- Occupation: Composer
- Years active: 1977–present
- Website: www.pierrebastien.com

Pierre Bastien (born 1953 in Paris) is a French musician, composer, and experimental musical instrument builder.

== Life and career ==
Bastien began building mechanical-based musical instruments at an early age, using items such as metronomes, cymbals, and pulleys. In 1977, he began collaborating with Pascal Comelade and composing music for dance companies. He performed in ensembles such as Operation Rhino, Nu Creative Methods, and Effectifs de Profil.

In 1986, he formed his own orchestra, Mecanium, composed of Meccano machines which play various instruments, such as Chinese lute, Moroccan bendir, Javanese saron, koto, and violin. These machines were often driven by the rotation of old turntables. By the 1990s, Mecanium consisted of up to 80 machine 'musicians', and toured various art and music festivals, including events in Norway, Australia, Japan, Canada, Poland, and the United States.

Bastien has collaborated with artists such as Robert Wyatt, Jac Berrocal, Emmanuelle Parrenin, Jaki Liebezeit, Pierrick Sorin, Lukas Simonis and Issey Miyake. He has released material on record labels such as Lowlands, Rephlex, Tigersushi, and Alga Marghen. He has also completed a doctorate on 18th century French literature, writing his thesis on pre-surrealist Raymond Roussel.

In 2001, Bastien released an album, Mecanoid, on Rephlex Records. In 2008, he released an album, Visions of Doing, on Western Vinyl. In 2014, he made installations with paper as the main sound source. In 2015, he came up with a new project called Silent motors, two frames with wheels and gears that are beamed on a screen with an overhead projector. In 2016 Bastien had a big exhibition of his mecanoids at November Music Festival in The Netherlands.

== Discography ==
Albums

- Nu Jungle Dances (1978) (with Bernard Pruvost, as Nu Creative Methods)
- Le Marchand De Calicots (1981) (with Bernard Pruvost, as Nu Creative Methods)
- Superstitions (1984) (with Bernard Pruvost, as Nu Creative Methods)
- Hommage à Jean Raine (1988) (with Peter Bastiaan and Bernard Pruvost)
- Mecanium (1988)
- Musiques Machinales (1993)
- Eggs Air Sister Steel (1996)
- Oblique Sessions (1997) (with Pascal Comelade, Jac Berrocal, and Jaki Liebezeit)
- Mécanologie Portative (1998) (with Klimperei)
- Neuf Jouets Optiques (1999) (with Karel Doing)
- Musiques Paralloïdres (1999)
- Mecanoid (2001)
- Musique Cyrillique (2001) (with Alexei Aigui)
- Mots d'Heures: Gousses, Rames (2002) (with Lukas Simonis)
- Pop (2005)
- Sé Verla al Revés (2005)
- Téléconcerts (2005)
- Les Premières Machines: 1968-1988 (2007)
- Visions of Doing (2008)
- Rag-Time Vol. 2 (2008) (with Dominique Grimaud)
- Occupé (2011) (with Claude Parle, Michel Potage, Jac Berrocal and Bernard Vitet,)
- Machinations (2012)
- Entomology (2012) (with The Insects Orchestra and One Man Nation)
- Blue as an Orange (2015)
- Phantoms (2017) (with Eddie Ladoire)
- The Mecanocentric Worlds Of Pierre Bastien (2017)
- Novia 391 (2017) (with Eduard Altaba)
- Tinkle Twang ‘N Tootle (2019)
- Impressions de Meccano (2019)
- Bandiera Di Carta (2019) (with Tomaga)
- *Room Sessions (2020) (with Gonçalo Almeida)
- Live Ateliers Claus (2021) (with Tomaga)
- Suspicious Moon (2022) (with David Fenech)
- Sonic Folkways
- Baba Soirée (2023) (with Michel Banabila)

EPs

- Boîte N°3 (1996)
- Boîte N°7 (2004)
- FTR003 (Split 12" with Anna Homler, Adrian Northover & Dave Tucker (TRIO) on First Terrace Records) (2018)

Singles

- XVII La Estrella (1993)
- Automatic Music (2010)
- Among the Skulls (2010)
