= Chance Meeting on a Dissecting Table of a Sewing Machine and an Umbrella =

Studio album by Nurse with Wound
- Released: 1979
- Recorded: September 1978
- Genres: Industrial; experimental
- Length: 48:50 (Original); 64:06 (2001 reissue)
- Label: United Dairies
- Producers: Nurse with Wound; Nick Rogers

Nurse with Wound chronology
Chance Meeting on a Dissecting Table of a Sewing Machine and an Umbrella (1979)	To the Quiet Men from a Tiny Girl (1980)

Professional ratings
Review scores
Source	Rating
AllMusic	link

Chance Meeting on a Dissecting Table of a Sewing Machine and an Umbrella, often shortened to Chance Meeting, is the debut album by the British industrial music project Nurse with Wound, released on their own United Dairies label in 1979. An unusual record which blends noise and jamming, it is described by AllMusic as "one of the more glowing examples of late-70s industrial noise" and defunct UK music magazine Sounds summed up their response by abandoning their usual star rating system to award the album a full 5 question marks. FACT magazine ranked the album at #51 on their list of "The 100 best albums of the 1970s". The album's artwork includes the Nurse with Wound list, an insert which lists several dozen avant-garde, krautrock, jazz, and other "weird" recording artists who influenced the group. Further, the album's back cover bears the dedication: "This album is dedicated to LUIGI RUSSOLO." Russolo was himself a pioneering noise music artist of the early 20th century.

The album's equally unusual title is a quote from the surreal, poetic novel Les Chants de Maldoror by Uruguayan-born French author Isidore-Lucien Ducasse, written under the pseudonym Comte de Lautréamont:

I am an expert at judging age from the physiognomic lines of the brow: he is sixteen years and four months of age. He is as handsome as the retractility of the claws in birds of prey; or, again, as the unpredictability of muscular movement in sores in the soft spot of the posterior cervical region; or, rather, as the perpetual motion rat-trap which is always reset by the trapped animal and which can go on catching rodents indefinitely and works even when it is hidden under straw; and, above all, as the chance juxtaposition of a sewing machine and an umbrella on a dissecting table!

— Comte de Lautréamont, The Songs of Maldoror, Canto VI, Verse 3.

== Recording ==
The album came about when Steven Stapleton was working as a signwriter in London in 1978. Completing a job at an independent recording studio, he engaged in conversation with the studio's engineer, Nick Rogers. Rogers, frustrated with the advertising and voice-over work the studio brought in, expressed a wish to work with more experimental bands. Stapleton informed Rogers that he was in such a band and a studio date was arranged. Stapleton, however, was lying and had to hurriedly put something together. He called his friends John Fothergill and Heman Pathak, telling them to get hold of an instrument of some sort. Thus, the first line-up of Nurse With Wound (whose name supposedly relates to a scene in the film Battleship Potemkin) was quickly assembled, Stapleton on percussion, Fothergill on guitar (with built-in ring modulator) and Pathak on organ. The trio didn't have a chance to rehearse before entering the studio, yet the album was completed within 6 hours, with Rogers adding what was called "commercial guitar" on the sleeve. The studio's piano and synthesizer were also used. The tale is so fortuitous as to appear unlikely but Stapleton and Fothergill agreed on the story when interviewed separately by David Keenan for his book England's Hidden Reverse.

The album contains 3 lengthy tracks and Stapleton has stated that these were edited from improvisations with some overdubbing. Stapleton designed the sleeve using an old pornographic magazine. Some copies came in a brown paper bag as a handful of stores were not prepared to have the cover on display; however, both Rough Trade and Virgin took copies without censorship. The original hand-numbered 500 copy pressing was cleared within weeks. Amongst those who bought the album were Tim Gane, later of Stereolab, and William Bennett of Whitehouse, both of whom would later work with Stapleton.

One of the most discussed aspects of the album however was the inclusion of the Nurse with Wound list, an A4 sheet with a list of bands and artist who had provided inspiration to the group. It remains a touchstone for collectors of experimental and outsider music. The 2001 reissue of the album contains the bonus track "Strain, Crack, Break", which consists of a heavily cut-up recording of David Tibet reading the list.

== Legacy ==
In 1998, The Wire included the album in their list of "100 Records That Set the World on Fire (While No One Was Listening)". The staff called the album "[t]he key document in the development of the British underground, and the cornerstone for all subsequent outsider forays into 'electric experimental music'," further describing it as "[a] monstrous trawl through twilight sounds, where bellowing, scraping avant garde composition met Krautrock's expansive pummel."

== Reissues ==
There have been several subsequent editions of the album. It was made available on cassette in 1980 and a vinyl repressing was available as part of the Psilotripitaka box set. A compact disc edition was issued via World Serpent in 1990 with a 21st anniversary edition (slightly belatedly) following in 2001 in different artwork with the aforementioned "Strain, Crack, Break" as a bonus track. All of these editions are out of print. A vinyl box set was released by Dirter Promotions in 2009, containing a copy of the album on two vinyl records and with an unedited version of Strain, Crack, Break from the 2001 reissue, alongside a Nurse With Wound list t-shirt and the album's cover art as both a pin badge and a print signed by Steven Stapleton.

A "remix" album was also released in 2003, Chance Meeting of a Defective Tape Machine and a Migraine which is, in fact, the sound of a malfunctioning tape deck distorting and adding electronic feedback to the music, eventually rendering it irrecognizable (the tape was made by Stapleton's friend and regular NWW live member Matt Waldron).

An edit of "The Six Buttons of Sex Appeal" appeared on the compilation Livin' Fear of James Last. It was a major edit, cutting the track down to only 4 minutes and 55 seconds.

== Track listing ==
All tracks are written by Steven Stapleton, John Fothergill and Heman Pathak.

Side A
No.	Title	Length
1.	"Two Mock Projections"	6:17
2.	"The Six Buttons of Sex Appeal"	13:06

Side B
No.	Title	Length
3.	"Blank Capsules of Embroidered Cellophane"	28:21

Bonus Track (present on all versions after 2001)
No.	Title	Length
4.	"Strain, Crack, Break"	15:20

== Personnel ==
- John Fothergill – synthesizer, guitar, keyboards, wind
- Heman Pathak – synthesizer, guitar, keyboards, wind
- Nicky Rogers – guitar
- Steve Stapleton – synthesizer, flute, guitar, keyboards

== Bibliography ==
- England's Hidden Reverse - David Keenan, SAF 2003 ISBN 0-946719-40-3
- Welcome To Cooloorta - video interview published by Brainwashed (website) 2004
