= Drew McDowall =

Scottish musician

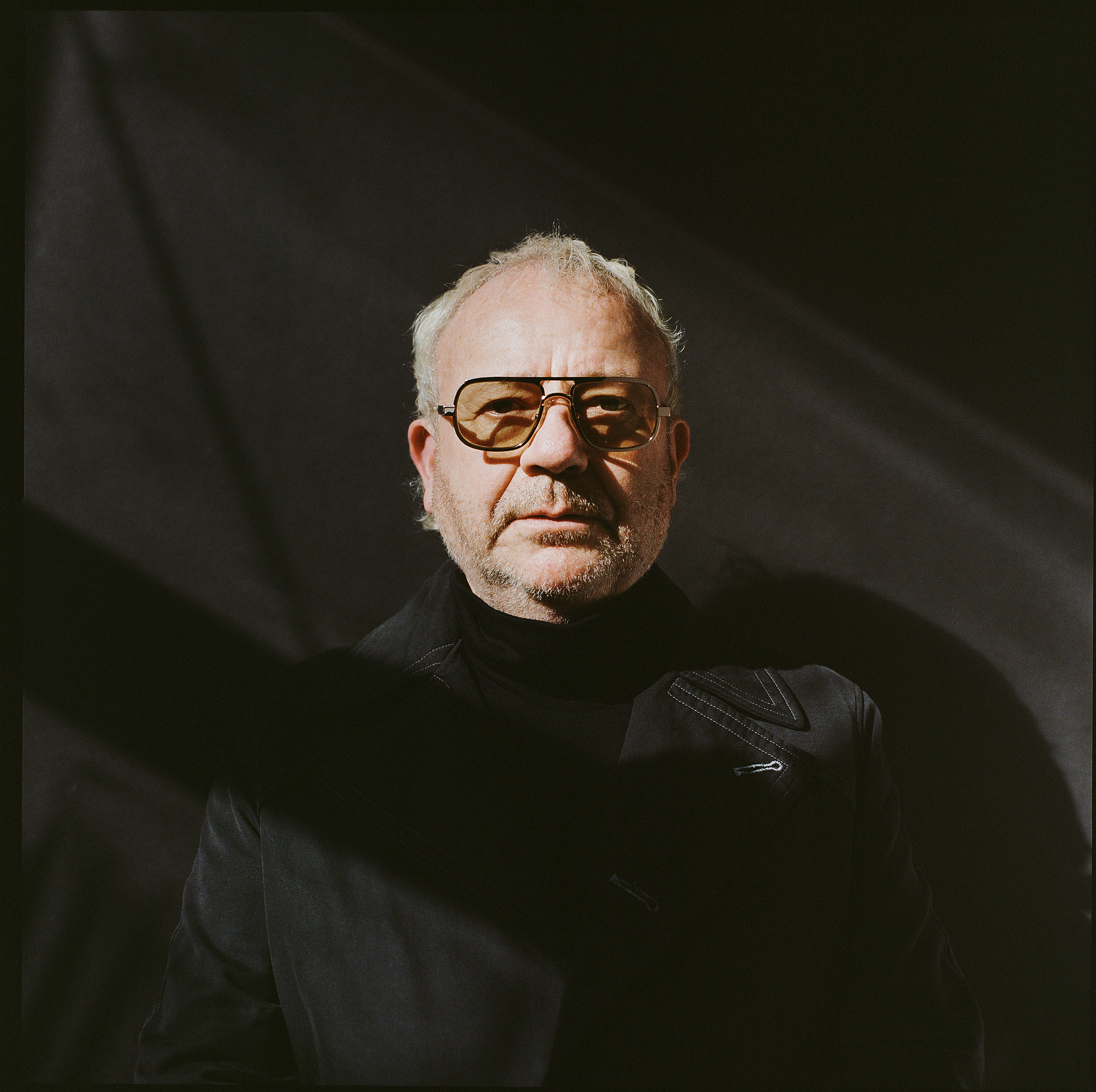

Background information
- Born: 28 January 1961 (age 65)
- Origin: Paisley, Scotland
- Genres: Drone, Experimental Electronic, Ambient
- Occupations: Composer, Musician, Sound Artist
- Instruments: Synthesizer, Field Recording
- Labels: Dais Records, Ascetic House, Bank, Exist
- Website: drewmcdowall.bandcamp.com

Drew McDowall is a Scottish composer and musician. He was a member of Coil in the 1990s contributing heavily to some of their most respected and influential works. As well as his solo work he has collaborated with Kali Malone, Caterina Barbieri, Robert Aiki Aubrey Lowe, Hiro Kone, Varg, Puce Mary, Shapednoise Rabit. James K and LEYA

== History ==
McDowall formed art-punk trio Poems in 1978 with his then-wife, Rose McDowall. During the 1980s, McDowall was a member of Psychic TV. McDowall performed with Coil regularly for several years, becoming an official member in 1994.

After moving to the US in the early 2000s he created Compound Eye, a collaborative project with the Tres Warren of Psychic Ills. Starting in 2012 McDowall started to concentrate on solo works, releasing four albums under his own name and touring North America, Europe, the Middle East, Asia and Australia. Beginning in 2018 he has toured a live AV reinterpretation of Coil's drone work, Time Machines, at festivals across the world.

In May 2023 Dais Records released Lamina, a 6 CD retrospective box set of his work and in May 2024 released A Thread, Silvered and Trembling, his 5th solo album on the label.

== Discography ==
=== Solo ===
- "Tongs" as Screwtape on the compilation album Interiors (1998)
- Haecciety Deluge (Ascetic House 2015)
- Collapse (Dais Records 2015)
- Unnatural Channel (Dais Records 2017)
- Third Helix (Dais Records 2018)
- Agalma (Dais Records 2020)
- Lamina (Dais Records 2023)
- A Thread, Silvered and Trembling (Dais Records 2024)

=== Coil ===
- Coil vs The Eskaton: Nasa Arab (12") (1994)
- Coil vs ELpH: Born Again Pagans (CD) (1994)
- ELpH: pHILM #1 (10") (1994)
- ELpH vs. Coil: Worship the Glitch (1995)
- Black Light District: A Thousand Lights in a Darkened Room (1996)
- Time Machines (1998, 2017)
- The Solstice and Equinox Singles:
  - Spring Equinox: Moon's Milk or Under an Unquiet Skull (7"/CD) (1998 March)
  - Summer Solstice: Bee Stings (7"/CD) (1998 June)
  - Autumn Equinox: Amethyst Deceivers (7"/CD) (1998 September)
  - Winter Solstice: North (7"/CD) (1999 January)
- "Blue Rats (Blue Cheese Remix)" and "Heartworms" with Coil on the compilation album Foxtrot (1998)
- Astral Disaster with Coil (1999 January)
- Coil: Musick to Play in the Dark Vol. 1
- A Guide for Beginners: The Voice of Silver with Coil (2001)
- A Guide for Finishers: Golden Hair with Coil (2001)
- Coil: 'Moon's Milk (In Four Phases)' (2XCD) (2002 January)

=== Other collaborations ===
- Magnetism with Kali Malone (Ideologic Organ, 2025)
- Les Fleurs De Mal with Rabit (Halcyon Veil, 2017)
- Nordic Flora Series pt3- Gore Tex City with Varg (Northern Electronics, 2017)
- Love Is the Capital with Hiro Kone (Geographic North, 2017)
- Perfect World with Uniform (12XU/Alter, 2015)
- Journey from Anywhere LP with Compound Eye (Editions Mego, 2013)
- Compound Eye 10" with Compound Eye (The Spring Press, 2013)
- The Origin of Silence 12" with Compound Eye (The Spring Press, 2012)
- "Seeds of Love" maxi-single with Backworld (Harbinger House, 2003)
- Brighter than the Universe/Red Eye 7" with Captain Sons and Daughters (2003)
- Godstar: Thee Director's Cut with Psychic TV (Temple Records, 2004)
- "Sweet Fang/Greenery" 7" with Captain Sons and Daughters (2006)

=== Remixes ===
- Drab Majesty Forget Tomorrow (Dais Records 2017)
- Croatian Amor Love Means Taking Action (Posh Isolation 2016)
- "The Snow (As Pure As?)" remix alongside John Balance on The Snow (1991)
- Nine Inch Nails "The Art of Self Destruction, Part One", "The Downward Spiral (The Bottom)", "Eraser (Denial; Realization)", "Eraser (Polite)" and "Erased, Over, Out" remixes alongside Coil on the album Further Down the Spiral (1995)
- "Cowboys In Bangkok 1995 (Coil vs Elph Mix)" remix alongside Peter Christopherson on the Chris and Cosey album Twist
- Hiro Kone "Severance" (2012)
- "Signal I" remix on the Long Distance Poison album Gliese Translations (2013)
- Azar Swan "In My Mouth" (2013)
