= Live in Porto =

Live album by Coil
- Released: 2006/2008
- Recorded: 21 June 2003
- Genre: Experimental
- Label: Threshold House (LIVE4)
- Producer: Coil

Alternative cover
- Purple design

Alternative cover
- Pink design

Live in Porto is the "authorised bootleg" of a live performance by Coil, which took place on 21 June 2003 at the Casa da Música Festival, Porto, Portugal. At this show, Coil were Peter Christopherson, Thighpaulsandra and Ossian Brown. Jhonn Balance was too sick to attend, as in case of Montreal concert at MUTEK Festival.

== Background ==
This limited edition bootleg in semi-transparent hand-made packaging came in six designs: white, black, red, blue, purple and pink. The package inside a clear plastic wallet includes audio CD, clear plastic CD-size disc with text printed onto it, printed acetates displaying colourful biological micrographs, and printed semi-transparent paper inserts containing single colour designs. Each of these six edition was limited to 100 numbered copies, making 600 copies total. Last ones (with blue, pink and purple designs) were made available for sale via Threshold House website on 1 February 2008, together with still available downloads in FLAC, aac and mp3 formats.

Jhonn Balance does not appear on this recording, so all five tracks are instrumental. "Blue Rats" was originally released in studio form on A Thousand Lights in a Darkened Room by Black Light District (alias for Coil). "Triple Sun" was never recorded in studio, but it was frequently played during Coil tournee. Its reworked version appears on The Ape of Naples. "Radio Westin" appeared as "Wraiths and Strays" on Black Antlers and Selvaggina, Go Back into the Woods. "The First Five Minutes After Death" is an extended version of exit song from Horse Rotorvator.

== Track listing ==
1. "Blue Rats" – 18:14
2. "Triple Sun" – 12:56
3. "Radio Westin" – 13:32
4. "Drip Drop" – 10:04
5. "The First Five Minutes After Death" – 11:24
