= ANS (album) =

Studio album by Coil
- Released: May 2003
- Genre: Experimental
- Length: 1:16:16 (2003 version); 4:15:23 (2004 version, DVD length included)
- Label: Eskaton: Threshold House
- Producer: Coil

Coil chronology
Live Two (2003)	ANS (2003)	Live One (2003)

Coil album chronology
The Remote Viewer (2002)	ANS (2003)	Black Antlers (2004)

ANS (also known as COILANS) is an experimental album by Coil. The album uses the ANS synthesizer, a photoelectric synthesizer created by Yevgeny Murzin from 1937 to 1957. It resides in the Moscow State University.

== Release history ==
The album was originally released in May 2003 on the band's Eskaton label, consisting of three untitled tracks. It was limited to 500 copies and came in a black C-shell case. They were exclusively sold at the Mutek 2003 concert in Montreal, Canada.

It was later re-released in September 2004 as an expanded four disc box-set on the Threshold House label. The first CD is nearly identical to the 2003 release, each track is a few seconds shorter. It came with new artwork. The release comprised three CDs and a DVD that held animations created by Peter Christopherson which synched with four songs that are not included on any of the CDs. Several of the drawings that were made to create the music are shown, although it is nowhere stated to which track the drawings do correspond.

It is stated in the insert that the songs are the work of Jhonn Balance solo, Jhonn Balance and Ossian Brown, Peter Christopherson solo, Thighpaulsandra solo, Ivan Pavlov solo and Jhonn Balance and Ivan Pavlov, although it is nowhere stated to whom which track corresponds.

== Track listing ==
All tracks are written by Coil. All of the tracks present on the CDs and DVD are untitled.

Original 2003 release
No.	Title	Length
1.	"[untitled]"	20:56
2.	"[untitled]"	25:39
3.	"[untitled]"	29:41
Total length:		76:16

2004 re-release, CD A
No.	Title	Length
1.	"[untitled]"	20:54
2.	"[untitled]"	25:38
3.	"[untitled]"	29:40
Total length:		76:12

2004 re-release, CD B
No.	Title	Length
1.	"[untitled]"	26:22
2.	"[untitled]"	30:13
Total length:		56:35

2004 re-release, CD C
No.	Title	Length
1.	"[untitled]"	28:04
2.	"[untitled]"	32:06
Total length:		60:10

2004 re-release, DVD
No.	Title	Length
1.	"[untitled]"	15:41
2.	"[untitled]"	10:08
3.	"[untitled]"	15:41
4.	"[untitled]"	20:56
Total length:		62:26

== Personnel ==
- Jhonn Balance
- Ossian Brown
- Peter Christopherson
- Thighpaulsandra
- Ivan Pavlov
