= Where the Long Shadows Fall (Beforetheinmostlight) =

EP by Current 93
- Released: 1995
- Recorded: 1995
- Genre: Experimental
- Length: 19:10
- Label: Durtro
- Producer: Steven Stapleton, David Tibet, Michael Cashmore

Current 93 chronology
| Tamlin (1995) | Where the Long Shadows Fall (Beforetheinmostlight) (1995) | All The Pretty Little Horses: The Inmost Light (1996) |

Where the Long Shadows Fall (Beforetheinmostlight) is an EP by English band Current 93. It is part of a box set entitled The Inmost Light, together with All The Pretty Little Horses: The Inmost Light and The Starres Are Marching Sadly Home (Theinmostlightthirdandfinal). The piece consists of David Tibet's spoken and whispered vocals over eerie noises and the "long shadows" loop, which is a sample of Alessandro Moreschi, the only castrato who made recordings, singing "Domine, Domine". Barely audible at the end of the piece is John Balance speaking the improvised phrase, "Why can't we all just walk away?" A 17-second excerpt of "The Frolic", from All the Pretty Little Horses, appears as a hidden track.

Originally available on compact disc and vinyl, the EP was reissued as part of the boxed set The Inmost Light in 2007.

== Track listing ==
1. "Where the Long Shadows Fall (Beforetheinmostlight)" – 19:10

== Personnel ==
- David Michael Tibet – vocals
- Michael Cashmore – guitar, bass
- David Kenny – guitar, engineering
- Steven Stapleton – bells, mixing
- John Balance – vocals
