= How to Destroy Angels =

How to Destroy Angels may refer to:

- How to Destroy Angels (Coil EP), a 1984 EP by Coil
- How to Destroy Angels (Remixes and Re-Recordings), a 1992 album by Coil
- How to Destroy Angels (band), a band featuring Trent Reznor
  - How to Destroy Angels (How to Destroy Angels EP), the band's 2010 eponymous EP
