= Moon's Milk (In Four Phases) =

Compilation album by Coil
- Released: January 2002
- Recorded: 1997—1998
- Genres: Experimental; electronic; psychedelia; dark ambient
- Length: 90:30
- Label: Eskaton
- Producer: Coil

Coil chronology
A Guide for Finishers: Golden Hair (2001)	Moon's Milk (In Four Phases) (2002)	The Remote Viewer (2002)

Moon's Milk (In Four Phases) is a 2002 compilation album by the English experimental group Coil, compiling four of the Moon's Milk EPs. The two-disc album compiles the CD versions of Spring Equinox, Summer Solstice, Autumn Equinox and Winter Solstice; these were originally recorded throughout 1998, and released seasonally per their titles from March 1998 to January 1999. The release was given the catalog number ESKATON 023 and features artwork by Steven Stapleton.

== Release ==
The album has a live version of "Amethyst Deceivers" hidden at the end of the first disc, following several minutes of silence after "A Warning from the Sun (For Fritz)". This recording of "Amethyst Deceivers" was later released on Live Two, although the Moon's Milk version is a slightly longer edit. At the time of release, a mail order edition was offered comprising the standard 2-CD set with the Moon's Milk (In Four Phases) Bonus Disc, a CD-R of extra material presented in sleeves that John Balance had individually hand-painted. The bonus disc was limited to 333 copies, 300 of which were offered for sale and 33 of which were supposedly withheld by Balance for his personal collection.

== Reissues ==
In 2006, Threshold House announced Moon's Milk (In Six Phases), a "deluxe gallery edition" 3CD/book set that was to compile their four Equinox and Solstice EPs, the three tracks from the Moon's Milk (In Four Phases) Bonus Disc and "some new reinterpretations of those songs". The book was to feature photographs of the 333 hand-painted covers for the Moon's Milk (In Four Phases) Bonus Disc along with a listing of their titles and respective owners. While the Black Antlers and The Remote Viewer re-releases were made available as announced, Peter Christopherson did not issue Moon's Milk (In Six Phases) in his lifetime. His death made it uncertain whether the package would ever eventuate as there had been no further Coil releases or reissues for years afterwards. Danny Hyde, who worked with Christopherson on the proposed reissue, eventually released the additional material that had been intended for the third disc of the set. Issued as Moon's Milk in Final Phase, the three tracks were credited to Electric Sewer Age rather than Coil.

On November 29, 2023, Dais Records announced that they would reissue Moon's Milk (In Four Phases) in a remastered edition on March 15, 2024 in digital and physical formats. The release includes the limited edition Moon's Milk (In Four Phases) Bonus Disc as bonus tracks.

== Track listing ==
Disc A:

1. "Moon's Milk or Under an Unquiet Skull" - 8:29
2. "Moon's Milk or Under an Unquiet Skull" - 8:09
3. "Bee Stings" - 4:55
4. "Glowworms/Waveforms" - 5:54
5. "Summer Substructures" - 8:07
6. "A Warning from the Sun (For Fritz)"/"Amethyst Deceivers" - 16:33

Disc B:

1. "Regel" - 1:17
2. "Rosa Decidua" - 4:55
3. "Switches" - 4:45
4. "The Auto-Asphyxiating Hierophant" - 5:58
5. "Amethyst Deceivers" - 6:37
6. "A White Rainbow" - 8:57
7. "North" - 3:46
8. "Magnetic North" - 8:56
9. "Christmas Is Now Drawing Near" - 3:28

== Personnel ==
- John Balance
- Peter Christopherson
- William Breeze
- Drew McDowall
- Rose McDowall
- Thighpaulsandra
