= Nekrophile Rekords =

Austrian record label

Nekrophile Rekords was an Austrian record label, founded by Zoe Dewitt, then known as Michael Dewitt, that was active during the 1980s.

Nekrophile released eight audiocassettes from 1983 through 1986, collections of industrial and ambient music. Most of this material was subsequently re-released on CD and vinyl through assorted third parties. The label was notable for releasing solo material from Throbbing Gristle member Genesis P-orridge (with Stan Bingo), and also for early material by the noted industrial band Coil (with Zos Kia), with the participation of Peter Christopherson, another member of Throbbing Gristle. Dewitt released solo material on the label under two names: Korpses Katatonik, and Zero Kama. The Zero Kama album The Secret Eye of L.A.Y.L.A.H. is notorious in that, per Dewitt, it is purported to have been recorded in its entirety using human bones and skulls as musical instruments.

== Thelema ==
The content and design of Nekrophile's releases indicated that its contributors were interested in the occult, particularly with Aleister Crowley and Thelema. Examples of this include the following:

- On The Secret Eye of L.A.Y.L.A.H., the album name and the track titles "Love Alway Yieldeth" and "Love Alway Hardeneth" are references to Crowley's The Book of Lies.
- On The Beast 666, the cover art is "The Sign of the Enterer", a photograph deriving from Liber O, published in Crowley's periodical The Equinox. The Korpses Katatonik track on this compilation is entitled "Choronzon", itself a reference to a demon in Thelema. Furthermore, "Post Mortem: The Sea of Cefalu" is a sound recording of the sea. Cefalu is the town in Sicily where Crowley established the Abbey of Thelema.
- On the Zos Kia track "Sicktone", a backing track can be heard in which a group of people are reciting the first few verses of The Book of the Law, the foundational holy book of Thelema.

== Releases ==
Nekrophile Rekords released the following eight cassettes.

Catalog No.	Artist	Title	Year
NRC01	Korpses Katatonik	Subklinikal Leukotomy Aphrenia Spasmophilik Lyssophobo Asphyxia Sinister Lethal Anorex	1983
NRC02	Genesis P-orridge/Stan Bingo	What's History	1983
NRC03	Various Artists	The Beast 666	1983
NRC04	LAShTAL	Thoum Aesh Neith	1986
NRC05	Zos Kia/Coil	Transparent	1984
NRC06	Various Artists	The Archangels Of Sex Rule The Destruction Of The Regime	1985
NRC07	Zero Kama	The Secret Eye of L.A.Y.L.A.H.	1984
NRC08	Ain Soph	Ars Regia	1986
