= Megalithomania! =

Live album by Coil
- Released: 2003 July
- Recorded: 12 October 2002
- Genre: Experimental
- Length: 40:22
- Label: Threshold House
- Producer: Coil

Coil chronology
The Key to Joy Is Disobedience (2003)	Megalithomania! (2003)	ANS (2003)

Megalithomania! is a live album by Coil recorded at their performance at the Megalithomania festival at Conway Hall in London, England. It is limited to a pressing of 230 copies, 123 of which were available in their box set The Key to Joy Is Disobedience.

This performance consists of an extended performance of only one song, "The Universe Is a Haunted House", which has never been released as a studio version. Another live version of the song appears on Live Four; it is also listed on "CD B" of Live One, although it is actually the same track as "Blue Chasms".

== Track listing ==
1. "The Universe Is a Haunted House" – 40:22

== Personnel ==
Credits adapted from the liner notes.

Coil

- Jhon Balance – musician
- Peter Christopherson – musician
- Thighpaulsandra – musician
- Ossian Brown – musician

Additional personnel

- Danny Hyde – sound engineer
