= Selvaggina, Go Back into the Woods =

Live album by Coil
- Released: July 2004
- Genre: Experimental
- Length: 1:04:57
- Label: Threshold House
- Producer: Coil

Coil chronology
Black Antlers (2004)	Selvaggina, Go Back into the Woods (2004)	...And the Ambulance Died in His Arms (2005)

Selvaggina, Go Back into the Woods is a live album by Coil, originally released in CD-R format in a limited edition of 230 copies. The release is a live performance in Jesi, Italy, on 11 July 2004.

== Release ==
Selvaggina was released in a sleeve identical to that of Coil Presents Time Machines, Megalithomania!, and the original version of Black Antlers.

== Background ==
Tracks 1–3 and 5–7 were released as studio versions with slightly augmented titles on Black Antlers. "Bang Bang" has not been given a studio release by Coil. "Tattooed Man" was later remade and released on The Ape of Naples. The live version of "Amethyst Deceivers" on this album is most similar to the versions released on The Ape of Naples and Live Two.

For this performance, Coil were John Balance, Peter Christopherson and Thighpaulsandra.

== Track listing ==
No.	Title	Length
1.	"The Gimp - Sometimes"	8:03
2.	"Sex with Sun Ra"	8:13
3.	"All the Pretty Little Horses"	3:18
4.	"Tattooed Man"	10:21
5.	"Teenage Lightning"	8:43
6.	"Wraiths and Strays"	6:48
7.	"Black Antlers"	5:35
8.	"Bang Bang"	3:21
9.	"Amethyst Deceivers"	10:31
Total length:		1:04:57
