= Musick to Play in the Dark Vol. 2 =

Studio album by Coil
- Released: September 2000
- Genre: Post-industrial; experimental; glitch; ambient; avant-garde
- Length: 56:56
- Label: Chalice; Dais Records
- Producer: Coil

Coil chronology
Queens of the Circulating Library (2000)	Musick to Play in the Dark Vol. 2 (2000)	Coil Presents Time Machines (2000)

Coil album chronology
Queens of the Circulating Library (2000)	Musick to Play in the Dark Vol. 2 (2000)	Constant Shallowness Leads to Evil (2000)

Musick to Play in the Dark Vol. 2 (written as Musick to Play in the Dark² on the packaging) is a studio album by Coil that was released in September 2000. It was the second of two albums attributed purely to a style called "moon musick," which signify their change from a "solar" group to a "moon" group. Musick to Play in the Dark Vol. 1 was the first installment.

== Background ==
The lyrics of "Batwings (A Limnal Hymn)" have many references to Musaeum Clausum written by Sir Thomas Browne. This song was also played at John Balance's funeral service and Peter Christopherson described it as "a language that only he knows".

The first 1,000 mail-order copies of the CD came with Coil Presents Time Machines as a bonus.

A shorter version of "Batwings (A Limnal Hymn)" appeared on the Russian compilation A Guide for Beginners: The Voice of Silver.

=== Editions ===
Four different versions of this album were pressed onto two 12" vinyl records:

1. A standard edition limited to 1300 numbered copies.
2. A special edition limited to 50 (see below) copies with one light blue record and one light green one.
3. "60 signed and numbered copies on amethyst coloured vinyl packaged in a white gatefold sleeve with a moon & trees picture attached to the front, a handprint in off-white paint on the back, a note saying that it is "suitable for framing (but beware of sunlight!)", and two signed prints. The records themselves have plain white labels, with gold leaf attached to the label on side four." -Brainwashed.com.
4. A special "Trauma" edition is said to be limited to 26 copies, which are lettered A to Z; however this edition might be limited to 13 copies, with two letters per set. "It was pressed white vinyl with plain white covers smeared with John Balance's own blood during a "psychotic/demonic episode". These also contain the cover picture and prints from the amethyst edition listed above. Initially, only 11 copies were to be sold with the remainder being held by Coil in their personal archive, but the edition was expanded due to high demand." -Brainwashed.com

The vinyl is etched with the following inscriptions:

- Side A: "REFLECTING THE MIRROR OF THE SEA"
- Side B: "HATHOR IS THE COW THAT JUMPED OVER THE MOON"
- Side C: "LAST ONE OUT TURN OFF THE LIGHTS"

The fourth side of the vinyl is etched with craters.

== Track listing ==
No.	Title	Length
1.	"Something"	5:02
2.	"Tiny Golden Books"	12:19
3.	"Ether"	11:32
4.	"Paranoid Inlay"	7:17
5.	"An Emergency"	1:18
6.	"Where Are You?"	7:53
7.	"Batwings (A Limnal Hymn)"	11:32
Total length:		56:56

== Personnel ==
- Coil were - John Balance, Peter Christopherson and Thighpaulsandra
- Rose McDowall - vocals on "An Emergency"

== Charts ==
2022 chart performance for "Musick to Play in the Dark Vol. 2"
Chart (2022)	Peak position
German Albums (Offizielle Top 100)	51
