= Windowpane & the Snow =

Windowpane & The Snow

Compilation album by Coil
- Released: 1995
- Genre: Experimental; Acid house
- Length: 50:50
- Label: Threshold House LOCI CD 7
- Producer: Coil

Coil chronology
Unnatural History II (1995)	Windowpane & The Snow (1995)	Unnatural History III (1997)

Windowpane & The Snow was a CD released by English electronic music group Coil. This release compiles the two EPs, "Windowpane" and "The Snow". The original versions of the songs "Windowpane" and "The Snow" appear on the album Love's Secret Domain.

== Background ==
"The Snow (As Pure As?)" remix is credited to John Balance and Drew McDowall. "The Snow (Driftmix)" and "The Snow (Out in the Cold)" remixes are by Peter Christopherson. "The Snow (Answers Come in Dreams I)" and "The Snow (Answers Come in Dreams II)" were remixed by Jack Dangers, the lead member of Meat Beat Manifesto, and are something of a departure for Coil, expressing a rather more mainstream Acid House feel. These two remixes frequently repeat a sample of the introductory elephants from Jean-Michel Jarre's Zoolook album, and prominently feature a house-style bass organ and breakbeats.

Danny Hyde and Stephen Thrower are also credited on the sleeve notes.

== Track listing ==
1. "Windowpane (Minimal Mix)" - 5:38
2. "Windowpane" - 5:48
3. "Windowpane (Astral Paddington Mix)" - 5:39
4. "The Snow (Driftmix)" - 2:34
5. "The Snow (Answers Come in Dreams I)" - 5:50
6. "The Snow (Out in the Cold)" - 7:50
7. "The Snow (As Pure As?)" - 6:42
8. "The Snow (Answers Come in Dreams II)" - 5:56
9. "The Snow" - 6:43
