= The Key to Joy Is Disobedience =

Box set by Coil
- Released: July 2003
- Genre: Experimental
- Length: 7:07:57
- Label: Threshold House
- Producer: Coil

Coil chronology
Live One (2003)	The Key to Joy Is Disobedience (2003)	Megalithomania! (2003)

The Key to Joy Is Disobedience was a box set released by the group Coil. It contains the following releases: Live Four, Live Three, Live Two, Live One, ANS, and Megalithomania!.

== Background ==
The set is often incorrectly referred to as "Live Box". Upon its release, the set cost just under $200. Other than CDs, the set contains four art prints, one of which is signed and one of which contains an actual drawing. A list of beast boxes is included as well. A black glass disc and a clear glass disc are also included, supposedly for scrying use. The set is sealed with a sticker that must be broken in order to access its contents.

The box set's title is based on a line from Aleister Crowley's "Hymn to Lucifer": "The Key of Joy is disobedience."

== Edition ==
This box set is limited to an edition of 100 normal copies and 23 special copies, which are subtitled "Beast Box". These so-called "beast boxes" each have their own individual titles. The titles are as follows:

- lipstick eyes meat
- arse doctor lense haircut
- spilt guilt
- decadent + symmetrical
- fear of the bee means the honey is for me
- why is a mouse when it spins
- it just is
- lake big nay ions lays
- feral evidence animal reverence
- jhonn balance
- when sycophancy was in its infancy
- we cure the unacceptable
- animals dream differently in winter
- offending team north division
- the word that light unites is space
- a bigger bucket
- sipping birdsong through bedsprings
- they all told lies beautifully
- a murder of crows
- extraterrestrial antelope
- the one yew bury

The "beast boxes" were hand decorated by John Balance as well as a few other known Coil acquaintances.

== In popular culture ==
In 2022, indie rock artist Ariel Pink released an album entitled The Key of Joy Is Disobedience with the project Ariel Pink's Dark Side.
