= Worship the Glitch =

Studio album by ELpH vs. Coil
- Released: 1995
- Genre: Experimental, glitch
- Length: 53:56
- Label: Eskaton
- Producer: Coil

ELpH vs. Coil chronology
Born Again Pagans (1994)	Worship the Glitch (1995)

Professional ratings
Review scores
Source	Rating
AllMusic	4/5 stars
Encyclopedia of Popular Music	3/5 stars

Worship the Glitch is the only full-length album by "ELpH vs. Coil", released in 1995, though an EP called Born Again Pagans is also credited to "Coil vs. ELpH". ELpH is the alias name that Coil used to describe random musical compositions that were generated from their own equipment, either by itself or as an unintended yet pleasant byproduct of their own work; for these reasons, this album can be essentially considered de facto as a Coil album.

== Background ==
John Balance, Peter Christopherson and Drew McDowall are credited for creating Worship the Glitch. "Mono" is a cover version of Nancy Sinatra's "Bang Bang (My Baby Shot Me Down)", consisting of a heavily processed guitar solo.

The first 500 copies of the CD were a special edition, which included a reflective cover. The 2X10" vinyl format was released in an edition of 2,000 numbered copies. There were also forty copies released with handmade covers by Jhonn Balance; some painted and some assembled by collage, each signed and given a unique title. The vinyl version uses slightly different track indexing than its CD counterpart.

The vinyl has the following etchings:

- Side A: IT NEVER HURTS...
- Side B: UNLESS YOU CATCH YOUR FINGER IN IT.
- Side C: ∞ TRANSMITTER
- Side D: AUM GENERATOR

== Track listing ==
=== CD version ===
1. "Dark Start" – 4:12
2. "Opium Hum" – 2:37
3. "Caged Birds" – 1:33
4. "The Halliwell Hammers" – 2:39
5. "Clorax Hurd" – 3:00
6. "The Halliwell Hammers (2)" – 3:43
7. "We Have Always Been Here" – 6:11
8. "Manunkind" – 1:23
9. "Bism" – 4:58
10. "Hydlepark" – 6:00
11. "Hysteron Proteron Jewel" – 2:18
12. "Decadent & Symmetrical" – 1:51
13. "Mono" – 5:27
14. "The Halliwell Hammers (3)" – 3:36
15. "Anything That Flies" – 3:09
16. "Ended" – 1:14

=== 2X10" version ===
Side A

1. "Dark Start" – 4:12
2. "Opium Hum" – 2:37
3. "Caged Birds" – 2:06
4. "The Halliwell Hammers" – 2:04
5. "Clorax Hurd" – 3:00

Side B

1. "The Halliwell Hammers (2)" – 3:43
2. "We Have Always Been Here" – 6:11
3. "Manunkind" – 1:23

Side C

1. "Bism" – 5:48
2. "Hydlepark" – 5:05
3. "Hysteron Proteron Jewel" – 2:18

Side D

1. "Decadent & Symmetrical" – 1:51
2. "Mono" – 5:27
3. "The Halliwell Hammers (3)" – 3:36
4. "Anything That Flies" – 3:09
5. "Ended" – 1:14
