= Black Antlers =

Studio album by Coil
- Released: June 2004
- Genre: Experimental
- Length: 50:26 (2004 version); 1:13:57 (2006 version)
- Label: Threshold House
- Producer: Coil

Coil chronology
ANS (2004)	Black Antlers (2004)	Selvaggina, Go Back into the Woods (2004)

Coil album chronology
ANS (2003)	Black Antlers (2004)	The Ape of Naples (2005)

Professional ratings
Review scores
Source	Rating
Allmusic	3/5 stars

Black Antlers is a studio album by the experimental band Coil. It was originally released in CD-R format in 2004 in a limited edition and was sold during their Even an Evil Fatigue mini-tour. The album was later re-edited by Peter Christopherson and expanded to include a second CD of two new tracks, as well as a new track on the first disc. The second edition was released in August 2006 on the same day as the expanded version of The Remote Viewer. Both reissues were mastered by Mark Godwin, printed in Thailand and feature high quality images and packaging. Although the original edition did not include a catalogue number, the reissue was given a catalogue number of THBKK2. In June 2025, the album was re-issued by Dais Records, featuring the same track listing as the 2006 edition, and including the original version of "Wraiths And Strays" as a bonus track on the digital release.

All songs from the original pressing of the album were played live around the time of its initial release. One such performance – Coil's June 2004 appearance in Jesi, Italy – was recorded and issued as Selvaggina, Go Back into the Woods, allowing comparison between the studio versions and their slightly altered live arrangements.

== Song info ==
"The Gimp (Sometimes)" was originally released as a recording by Coil on the compilation Hate People Like Us featuring remixes and covers of the musician People Like Us. The original version was titled "The Gimp/Sometimes" and is more heavily drone-based compared to the later version on Black Antlers. The lyrics to this song also appeared in an untitled live piece performed at New Forms III in 2002.

"Sex with Sun Ra" had been mentioned by Coil for many years before finally appearing on Black Antlers, even as far back as six years prior. A version of "Sex with Sun Ra (Part One – Saturnalia)", titled simply "Sex with Sun Ra", later appeared on the compilation Rough Trade Shops: Counter Culture 04. The version on the compilation is 6:00 in length. The track was written about eccentric jazz musician Sun Ra.

"Wraiths and Strays (From Montreal)" is from a live performance on 29 May 2003, in Montreal, Canada at Mutek 2003. "The Wraiths and Strays of Paris" is an edited version of a live performance in Paris, France at La Locomotive on 23 May 2004. The key difference between the two versions is that the Mutek performance features only Christopherson and Thighpaulsandra while the Paris recording features the full touring line-up. The song is built around a sample of the track "Montparnasse" by King of Woolworths which was initially used without permission.

"All the Pretty Little Horses" is a traditional lullaby that was brought to light on the Current 93 album All the Pretty Little Horses. Balance provided vocals for three tracks on this album and often introduced the song live as being "from my friend's album".

"Teenage Lightning (10th Birthday Version)" is a version of the songs "Teenage Lightning 1" and "Teenage Lightning 2" from the previous Coil album Love's Secret Domain. The version of the song as it appears on "Black Antlers" is similar to the version on The Ape of Naples titled "Teenage Lightning 2005".

"Black Antlers (Where's Your Child?)" is a cover of the 1988 acid house track "Where's Your Child?" by Bam Bam. Coil's studio recording is instrumental but, when performing the song live, Balance sang the vocal parts from the Bam Bam version.

== Track listing ==
"Sex with Sun Ra (Part One – Saturnalia)"
Sample of "Sex with Sun Ra (Part One – Saturnalia)", taken from the album Black Antlers

All tracks are written by Coil, except where noted.

Original 2004 release
No.	Title	Music	Length
1.	"The Gimp (Sometimes)"		11:25
2.	"Sex with Sun Ra (Part One – Saturnalia)"		9:24
3.	"All the Pretty Little Horses"	Traditional	4:47
4.	"Wraiths and Strays (From Montreal)"		8:25
5.	"Teenage Lightning (10th Birthday Version)"		9:15
6.	"Black Antlers (Where's Your Child?) (Vers 1)"	Bam Bam	7:08
Total length:			50:25

2006 re-release, disc 1
No.	Title	Length
1.	"The Gimp (Sometimes)"	11:26
2.	"Sex with Sun Ra (Part One – Saturnalia)"	9:22
3.	"The Wraiths and Strays of Paris"	8:44
4.	"All the Pretty Little Horses"	4:45
5.	"Teenage Lightning (10th Birthday Version)"	9:15
6.	"Black Antlers (Where's Your Child?)"	7:10
7.	"Sex with Sun Ra (Part Two – Sigillaricia)"	5:11

2006 re-release, disc 2
No.	Title	Length
1.	"Departed"	6:28
2.	"Things We Never Had"	11:33
Total length:		73:57

2025 re-release, disc 3
No.	Title	Length
1.	"Wraiths and Strays (From Montreal)"	8:27
Total length:		82:24

== Personnel ==
- Jhonn Balance
- Peter Christopherson
- Thighpaulsandra
- Tom Edwards
- Cliff Stapleton
- Mike York
- Danny Hyde
