= Gay Man's Guide to Safer Sex =

Video by David Lewis (1992) Robert Falconer (1997)
- Released: 1992, 1997, 2024
- Recorded: 1992, 1997, 2024
- Studio: Pride Video Productions
- Genres: Experimental, dark ambient
- Length: 1997 72mins 2024 55mins
- Producer: Coil

Gay Man's Guide to Safer Sex is a safer sex instructional documentary produced by Mike Esser and Tony Carne of Pride Video in association with the Terrence Higgins Trust in 1992. The film was directed by David Lewis and featured a soundtrack by John Balance and Peter Christopherson of Coil. The medical information included in the film is presented by Mike Youle, a British doctor specialising in HIV treatment. In 1997, a sequel was released, directed by Robert Falconer. Gay Man's Guide to Safer Sex '97 featured a radical recut of some of the original scenes asking the British Board of Film Classification to look again at what was permissible and becoming one of the first programmes to discuss the breakthrough of Triple Combination Therapy and the ramifications and personal experiences of living with HIV. The medical information and discussion was again led by Mike Youle. The 1997 film was released on retail video in the UK, Australia, and the USA and later on DVD. It is still in distribution on DVD.

In 1997, Gay Man's Guide to Safer Sex '97 premiered to a sellout audience at the BFI National Film Theatre on London's South Bank. In March 2022, the 30th anniversary of the 1992 Gay Man's Guide To Safer Sex was marked at London's Barbican Cinema by a sold-out retrospective screening in Cinema 2. Original Executive Producer Tony Carne and Terrence Higgins Trust Campaigns Director Richard Angell were the guests for a post-show ScreenTalk.

On April 30, 2024, Gay Man's Guide To Safer Sex '97 marked 40 years since the discovery that the HIV virus causes AIDS with a sold-out screening in the mainhouse Barbican Cinema 1 of a restored and significantly revised 55-minute 2K Digital Cinema Print of the 2024 Director's Cut. The original star of both films Aiden Brady (as Aiden Shaw in the two Gay Man's Guide films) appeared in the ScreenTalk, along with director and presenter of the 1997 film Rob Falconer, and co-founders of UK HIV awareness and prevention organisation The Love Tank CIC Marc Thompson and Dr. Will Nutland, which was filmed by Barbican Cinema. Original cast members health educator and London Service Director Mark Maguire and Jono Wolf also attended. Prominent London clinics Mortimer Market Centre and 56 Dean Street, and Central North West London NHS Foundation Trust cooperated to launch new PrEP awareness lapel pins and QR code PrEP appointment condom packs at the event.

The return of both films to the cinema screen was spearheaded by Barbican Cinema curator and programmer Alex Davidson who said of the 1997 film and 2024 Director's Cut: "It was like nothing I'd ever seen before – frank and unashamedly sex-positive."

The 2024 Director's Cut returned to the US as a selection for the Palm Springs LGBTQ+ International Film Festival 2024 in California, screening on September 24 in Camelot Theatres 500-seater Theatre One, East Baristo Road with Rob Falconer attending the show. The film won a Festival Favourites Audience Award and was locally supported by key Palm Springs HIV services and groups like PS Test's Dr. Phyllis Ritchie and US survivor's network Let's Kick ASS, led in Palm Springs by Jax Kelly.

== Soundtrack ==
Coil provided the music for the 1992 film only. Some of the material is reworked, while some is exclusive to the movie. The track timings given represent the demo version and are in order of their chronological appearance in the film.

1. "Theme from Gay Man's Guide to Safer Sex" – 8:13
2. "Exploding Frogs" – 8:40
3. "Nasa-Arab 2" – 4:12
4. "Theme from Gay Man's Guide to Safer Sex Reconstruction" – 7:49
- "Exploding Frogs" is a radically remixed version of "Omlagus Garfungiloops" from Stolen & Contaminated Songs.

The soundtrack was released officially on 28 June 2019, with the title The Gay Man's Guide to Safer Sex +2.

The tracklist also differs from the demo version, containing an alternative take of the theme and the original version of "Omlagus Garfungiloops":

1. "Alternative Theme from Gay Man's Guide to Safer Sex 6:43
2. "Exploding Frogs" – 8:41
3. "Nasa-Arab 2" – 4:12
4. "Nasa-Arab" – 10:59
5. "Omlagus Garfungiloops" – 4:24
6. "Theme from Gay Man's Guide to Safer Sex" – 8:35

== Soundtrack to 1997 and 2024 Director's Cut films ==
There was no music by Coil in the 1997 sequel or its 2024 Director's Cut re-release. The soundtrack for the 1997 film was by French/UK electro pop combo Angel and originally released in 1997 on CD in conjunction with the first-run release retail units of the 1997 film as "Angel - Gay Man's Guide to Safer Sex '97". The tracks as credited on the end titles of the 1997 first run retail release and later USA DVD release were:

1. "Theme from Gay Man's Guide to Safer Sex '97 - No Different" (Preston/Chubb) – 5:33
2. "Great Big Beautiful City" (Preston/Chubb) – 6:40
3. "Safe From Harm" (Preston/Chubb) – 7:12
4. "The Bell" (Preston/Chubb) – 7:00

The soundtrack for the 2024 Director's Cut revisited some of the 1997 Angel material, and was also by UK/US band Tall Houses, along with previously unreleased remixes by French DJ and remixer Nuw Idol. Tall Houses also performed the score for the 2024 re-release trailers.

The tracks as credited on the end titles of the 2024 Director's Cut re-release are:

1. "Theme from Gay Man's Guide to Safer Sex '97 - No Different" (Preston/Chubb) – 5:33
2. "Intolerance [2024 No Defence Dub]" (Palmer) performed by Tall Houses – 3:22
3. "Intolerance [Auditorium Remix]" (Palmer) performed by Tall Houses – 3:52
4. "No Different [Nuw Idol Remix]" remixed by Nuw Idol – 7:39
5. "No Different [Club Remix]" remixed by Nuw Idol – 7:37
6. "No Different [Instrumental Club Mix]" remixed by Nuw Idol – 7:37
7. "Great Big Beautiful City" (Preston/Chubb) – 6:40
8. "The Bell" (Preston/Chubb) – 7:00
