= Time Machines =

Studio album by Time Machines
- Released: 26 January 1998
- Genre: Electronic; drone
- Length: 73:32
- Label: Eskaton
- Producer: Coil

Time Machines chronology
Time Machines (1998)	Coil Presents Time Machines (2000)

Time Machines is a 1998 studio album by English experimental group Coil, originally released under the one-off project alias Time Machines. The album was created under the premise of psychedelic drone pieces named after corresponding hallucinogenic drugs, "tested and retested" during the album's studio sessions for apparent narcotic potency.

== Background and composition ==
Time Machines is composed of four electronic drone pieces created with modular synthesizers, which as hinted at in their track names are an attempt to recreate the effects of telepathine, DOET, 5-MeO-DMT and psilocybin mushrooms. John Balance intended the album to cause "temporal slips": he commented that the musical effect was demonstrated when the group "listened to it loud [and] lost track of time". Drew McDowall created the original demo for the record, at first inspired by what he saw as a hypnotic state created in Tibetan music, but his final idea with Balance and Christopherson was to use filters and oscillators on the tones of the demo to induce trancelike effects.

In a 1998 interview, given to David Keenan for The Wire magazine, Balance explained the album's concept and intent, inspired by trancelike states:

One of the interesting things with Time Machines is that there's a handful of responses which we've had where what happened to the listeners was exactly what we intended to happen. There would be some kind of temporal disruption caused by just listening to the music, just interacting with the music. The drugs thing is actually a hook we hung it on – it originally came out of me and Drew talking that some of the types of music you listen to – sacred musics like Tibetan music or anything with a sacred intent which often is long ceremonial type music which could last for a day or three days or something. There are periods of time in that where you will come out of time. That's the intention of it to go into a trance and achieve an otherness. We thought can we do this sort of electronic punk-primitive? We did demos with a simple mono synth and we managed it. We sat in the room and listened to it loud and we lost track of time – it could be five minutes in or 20 minutes in but you suddenly get this feeling, the hairs on the back of your neck, and you'd realise that you'd had some sort of temporal slip. We fine-tuned, well, filters and oscillators and stuff, to try and maximise this effect. It was that we were after with simple tones – somehow you could slip through.

When Time Machines was first released, the group was initially very conscious that it should not be labeled as a Coil album due to how abstract and different it was compared to previous Coil albums. However, the group later tended towards regarding Time Machines a part of the Coil catalog; this led the 2000 follow-up live album Coil Presents Time Machines to be released as a Coil album.

== Legacy ==
A five-disc Time Machines box set was announced in 1998, but never developed. A two-disc version was announced in January 2006 as a future release, but this was never expanded on either, although an album by Peter Christopherson, called Time Machines II, was released posthumously. In retrospect, Drew McDowall has remarked that "[p]eople tell me how much of an impact it had on them – which is always pretty surprising."

In 2018, surviving member Drew McDowall collaborated with British visual artist Florence To to perform an updated audio-visual version of the entire album in selected venues and festivals around the world.

== Reception ==
Professional ratings
Review scores
Source	Rating
AllMusic	4/5 stars

Sean Cooper of AllMusic gave the album four out of five stars and described it as "[e]njoyable, if a mite limited in scope." Record distributor Boomkat praised the album upon its re-release, calling it a "now-classic chemical songbook".

== Track listing ==
No.	Title	Length
1.	"7-Methoxy-β-Carboline: (Telepathine)"	23:23
2.	"2,5-Dimethoxy-4-Ethyl-Amphetamine: (DOET/Hecate)"	13:20
3.	"5-Methoxy-N,N-Dimethyltryptamine: (5-MeO-DMT)"	10:02
4.	"4-Indolol, 3-[2-(Dimethylamino)Ethyl], Phosphate Ester: (Psilocybin)"	26:46
Total length:		73:32

== Personnel ==
According to AllMusic:

- Peter Christopherson – performer
- John Balance – performer
- Drew McDowall – performer

== See also ==
- Harmine
- DOET/hecate
- 5-MeO-DMT
- Psilocybin
