= Mike Youle =

British physician (born 1960)

Michael Simon Youle (born 1960) is a British doctor and clinical researcher specializing in HIV treatment. He publicised the concept of pre-exposure prophylaxis (PREP) for HIV and has studied the health economics of HIV therapy. In 1995, he was listed as one of 40 influential gay men by The Independent.

== Education and career ==
Youle qualified at Sheffield Medical School in 1984. One of the founders of the Kobler Clinic of Chelsea & Westminster Hospital in London, the earliest specialist centre combining HIV care and research in the UK, he was the centre's Clinical Trials Co-ordinator from 1986 to 1996. In 1990–91, he served as a consultant for the World Health Organization's Global Programme on AIDS and the National Programme on AIDS in Kampala. Youle has been Director of HIV Clinical Research at the Royal Free Hospital in London and Honorary Senior Lecturer in Public Health at the Royal Free & University College Medical School (now UCL Medical School) since 1996. He held a visiting professorship at Belgrade University in 2004.

== Research ==
Youle is noted for introducing the concept of mass pre-exposure prophylaxis for HIV to a wider audience at the XVIth International AIDS Conference in Toronto, Ontario, Canada in 2006. This was followed up by expanding the concept in publication, in collaboration with Mark Wainberg.

He has also studied health economics as applied to HIV therapy. His studies in health economics and health outcomes have helped to provide evidence to budget holders to fund HIV treatment within the UK. Other recent research interests include ageing in HIV-positive people.

He has served as principal investigator on the TILT, ALCAR, COLATE and VANGUARD studies.

== Education, memberships and trustee roles ==
Youle is a board or committee member of the British HIV Association (responsible for the British HIV therapeutic guidelines), International Association of Physicians in AIDS Care and the MANON Therapeutic Vaccine Programme. He is a trustee of the Red Hot AIDS Charitable Trust and a medical advisor to the National AIDS Manual and the Elton John AIDS Foundation.

Youle has presented two films on safer sex, The Gay Man's Guide to Safer Sex (1992) and Getting it Right Safer Sex for Young Gay Men (1993).

== Key publications ==
=== Books ===
- Palfreeman A, Youle M, Farthing C. Drugs in HIV and AIDS (2nd edn) (Wiley-Blackwell; 1998) (ISBN 0471970638)
- Youle M, Clarbour J, Wade P, Farthing C. AIDS Therapeutics in HIV Disease (Churchill Livingstone; 1988) (ISBN 044304029X)

=== Reviews ===
- Youle M, Wainberg MA. (2003) Pre-exposure chemoprophylaxis (PREP) as an HIV prevention strategy. J. Int. Assoc. Physicians AIDS Care 2: 102–105

=== Research papers ===
- Chancellor JV, Hill AM, Sabin CA, Simpson KN, Youle M. (1997) Modelling the cost effectiveness of lamivudine/zidovudine combination therapy in HIV infection. PharmacoEconomics 12: 54–66
