= Live One (Coil album) =

Live album by Coil
- Released: June 2003
- Recorded: 2 April, 17 June 2000
- Genre: Experimental
- Length: 101:48
- Label: Threshold House LOCI CD18
- Producer: Coil

Coil chronology
Live Two (2003)	Live One (2003)	The Key to Joy Is Disobedience (2003)

Professional ratings
Review scores
Source	Rating
AllMusic	3.5/5 stars

Live One was a double live album released by Coil. This CD was the fourth of four releases in a series. Its counterparts are Live Four, Live Three and Live Two. This album was later released as part of Coil's box set The Key to Joy Is Disobedience.

== Background ==
"CD A" was originally released as Coil Presents Time Machines. It is a recording of a performance which took place on 2 April 2000 at the Cornucopea festival in the Royal Festival Hall in London, England.

"CD B" is a recording of a live concert that took place at Sónar in Barcelona, Spain on 17 June 2000. The studio instrumental used during this performance has surfaced on the internet. The video for this show is also available on the Colour Sound Oblivion 16DVD set.

"Everything Keeps Dissolving", "Blue Chasms" and "Elves" are otherwise unreleased. However, "Elves" was widely circulated on the bootleg Backwards, in its original studio form; That version, however, is notably absent of Balance's vocals. "Circulating" is a short version of the song "Queens of the Circulating Library", from the album with the same name.

Coil were: Jhon Balance, Peter Christopherson, Simon Norris, Thighpaulsandra on "CD A". "CD B" features all of the same artists as "CD A" with the addition of William Breeze.

== Track listing ==
=== "CD A" ===
1. "Everything Keeps Dissolving" – 15:14
2. "Queens of the Circulating Library" – 13:50
3. "Chasms" – 21:39

=== "CD B" ===
1. "Everything Keeps Dissolving" – 5:28
2. "Amethyst Deceivers" – 6:23
3. "Circulating" – 12:48
4. "The Universe Is a Haunted House" – 18:09
5. "Elves" – 8:17
- "Blue Chasms" is printed on the sleeve as an additional song before "Elves", but does not appear on this release.
- A track indexing error cuts "The Universe Is a Haunted House" off prematurely and it continues into the final track "Elves".
- Unlike every other Coil live release (excluding Transparent), Live One is almost entirely bereft of live vocals, the one exception being "Elves", on which John Balance produces several nigh-incomprehensible screams, apparently of the same phrase. There are sampled vocals elsewhere, however, as on both versions of "Queens..." and "Chasms".
