= The Starres Are Marching Sadly Home (Theinmostlightthirdandfinal) =

EP by Current 93
- Released: 1996
- Recorded: 1995
- Genre: Experimental, dark ambient, apocalyptic folk
- Length: 22:16
- Label: Durtro
- Producer: Steven Stapleton, David Tibet, Michael Cashmore

Current 93 chronology
All The Pretty Little Horses: The Inmost Light (1995)	The Starres Are Marching Sadly Home (Theinmostlightthirdandfinal) (1996)	Seven Seals (1996)

The Starres are Marching Sadly Home (Theinmostlightthirdandfinal) is an EP by the experimental music collective Current 93. It is the final part in the Inmost Light Trilogy, a cycle of three thematically related recordings released in 1995 and 1996. The Starres are Marching Sadly Home is the most experimental of the three, serving as an epilogue to the centerpiece album All the Pretty Little Horses and the introductory EP Where The Long Shadows Fall (Beforetheinmostlight). Like Long Shadows, The Starres is a lengthy, minimal piece with eerie loops and layered vocals; unlike Long Shadows, this piece features full, continuous lyrics. An a capella performance of the traditional song "All the Pretty Little Horses" is performed by Shirley Collins at the finale.

Originally available on compact disc and vinyl, the EP was reissued as part of the boxed set The Inmost Light in 2007. For this release, the title was modified to "The Stars Are Marching Sadly Home…"

It was rated three stars by AllMusic.

== Track listing ==
1. "The Starres Are Marching Sadly Home (Theinmostlightthirdandfinal)" - 22:16

== Personnel ==
- David Tibet – vocals, music, lyrics
- Shirley Collins – vocals
- Roxanne Stapleton – vocals
- Andria Degens – vocals
- David Kenny – guitar, engineering
- Steven Stapleton – music, mixing
- Scott Howland – assistant engineering
