= Rosa Mundi (group) =

British electronic music group

Rosa Mundi was the name of an electronic music supergroup which consisted of Rose McDowall and John Balance. The group is credited for "The Snow Man", which appeared on the compilations The Final Solstice and The Final Solstice II, and the split 7-inch vinyl Grief. It is also credited on the song "Christmas Is Now Drawing Near" from the Coil single Winter Solstice: North, later released on Moon's Milk (In Four Phases).

== Discography ==
=== Compilation appearances ===
- "The Snowman" on Grief
- "The Snowman" on The Final Solstice/The Final Solstice II

=== Guest appearances ===
- "Christmas Is Now Drawing Near" on Winter Solstice: North
- "Christmas Is Now Drawing Near" on Moon's Milk (In Four Phases)
