= How to Destroy Angels (Coil EP) =

EP by Coil
- Released: 1984
- Recorded: 19 February 1984
- Studios: Britannia Row Studios, London
- Genres: Ritual music; ritual ambient; drone
- Length: 16:45
- Label: L.A.Y.L.A.H. Antirecords LAY05
- Producer: Coil

Coil chronology
How to Destroy Angels (1984)	Scatology (1984)

Professional ratings
Review scores
Source	Rating
AllMusic	2.5/5 stars

How to Destroy Angels is the debut extended play by British experimental band Coil. The group at this time consisted only of John Balance and Peter Christopherson, the latter having become a member after Balance had shown enthusiasm for his music for a period of time beforehand. It was originally released in 1984 on L.A.Y.L.A.H. Antirecords, but was later re-pressed in 1988.

== Background ==
How to Destroy Angels is a single 17 minute piece of ritual music taking up all of the A-side. The contents of the B-side, "Absolute Elsewhere", varied over pressings of the EP. The first edition contained the B-side of other disused records, sanded down as much as possible so as to damage a record player's cartridge if played, with an unspecified length. The second edition contained a 22 minute track of test tones, and the third edition simply contained a flat, grooveless face with the track given as having a length of zero minutes and zero seconds. On the 1992 album How to Destroy Angels (Remixes and Re-Recordings), where the contents of the EP were reinterpreted, "Absolute Elsewhere" is presented as three seconds of silence.

Originally, track "How to Destroy Angels" was intended to be the B-side of the track "Silence and Secrecy", but due to Christopherson and Balance leaving Psychic TV, owners of Temple Records, the idea was shelved. "Silence and Secrecy" has only been released in partial form by way of a two-minute excerpt on the Zos Kia and early Coil retrospective Transparent.

== Legacy ==
How to Destroy Angels is the name of Trent Reznor's (of Nine Inch Nails fame) side project together with his wife Mariqueen Maandig and Atticus Ross. Reznor has acknowledged that the earlier Coil release was the source of the band's name and that he had run the idea by Peter Christopherson before using it.

== Track listing ==
=== Side one ===
1. "How to Destroy Angels" – 16:45

=== Side two ===
1. "Absolute Elsewhere" – ? / 22:47 / 0:00

== Personnel ==
- John Balance – performer
- Peter Christopherson – performer
