= Coil Presents Time Machines =

Live album by Coil
- Released: September 2000
- Recorded: 2 April 2000
- Genre: Experimental
- Length: 50:44
- Label: Eskaton
- Producer: Coil

Coil chronology
Musick to Play in the Dark Vol. 2 (2000)	Coil Presents Time Machines (2000)	Constant Shallowness Leads to Evil (2000)

Coil Presents Time Machines was a live CD by Coil. This CD was produced in a limited amount of 1,000 copies and was given away with the initial mail orders of Musick to Play in the Dark Vol. 2. The CD is a live performance which took place on 2 April 2000 at the Cornucopia festival in the Royal Festival Hall in London, England. The name of the performance was "Time Machines from the Heart of Darkness". The album was later reissued as "CD A" on Live One in an unaltered form.

== Release ==
"Everything Keeps Dissolving" and "Chasms" appear on "CD B" of Live One as well. However, "Chasms" is titled "Blue Chasms". Neither of these songs have had a proper studio release. The lyrics for "Chasms" are "every man and woman is a star", a phrase coined by Aleister Crowley. "Circulating" is a shortened live version of Queens of the Circulating Library.

John Balance, Peter Christopherson, Simon Norris, and Thighpaulsandra are credited as performance members. Dorothy Lewis' (Thighpaulsandra's mother) vocals can be heard on the song "Queens of the Circulating Library".

The catalogue number is ESKATON CD 24. Constant Shallowness Leads to Evil has the similar catalogue number of ESKATON 24.

Coil Presents Time Machines is a separate and different album from Time Machines, also produced by Coil.

== Track listing ==
1. "Everything Keeps Dissolving" – 15:14
2. "Circulating" – 13:50
3. "Chasms" – 21:39
