= Astral Disaster =

Studio album by Coil
- Released: January 1999
- Recorded: Samhain 1998
- Genre: Experimental; avant-garde; drone
- Length: 46:08 (vinyl); 72:22 (CD)
- Label: Acme/Prescription; Threshold House
- Producer: Coil

Coil chronology
Winter Solstice: North (1998)	Astral Disaster (1999)	Musick to Play in the Dark Vol. 1 (1999)

Astral Disaster is a studio album by Coil, originally released in January 1999 on Acme/Prescription, reissued in 2000 on Threshold House, and then reissued in 2017 through Acme/Prescription.

The original pressing of the album was released in an edition of 99 copies on 12" vinyl via the record label Acme/Prescription with catalogue number Drug 8, was available only to those who had subscribed to the entire Drug series, and was packaged in a plain black sleeve with a title sticker signed and numbered by John Balance and Peter Christopherson. It included an insert with the track listing and release notes, and a piece of handmade artwork in a plastic zip-lock bag. The later pressing of this album, released on CD and 12" via the Threshold House label, is completely rebuilt and remade with much more texture than the first release.

== Background and composition ==
The Threshold House version includes a second version of "The Mothership & The Fatherland" titled "MÜ-ÜR". The 12" inch release was limited to 1,000 copies on gray vinyl and a special edition of 100 copies on red vinyl. The special edition includes a sheet of lyrics that is signed by John Balance, Peter Christopherson and Thighpaulsandra. It also includes an original numbered drawing, which is also signed by Balance and Christopherson. Some of the more notable differences between the releases, other than the later release being more built up, is the disappearance of the sitar as well as the disappearance of the sound effect on John's voice on the original version of "The Sea Priestess". "Second Son Syndrome" was purposely renamed "2nd Sun Syndrome" upon the reissue.

The inner sleeve photo portraits were taken by Peter Christopherson and John Balance of each other during the total eclipse of the sun. Supposedly, the majority of the album was recorded in an area below the level of the Thames River. "The Avatars" was created with a Synton Syrinx synthesizer, and was, according to Balance, his attempt at recreating memories of sneaking through his house at night to watch The Quatermass Experiment. The title of the song comes from a book by George Russell.

Most of the lyrics to "The Sea Priestess" originate from Aleister Crowley's descriptions of the murals on the walls of the Abbey of Thelema at Cefalu in Sicily.

== Critical reception ==
In its review of the 2018 Acme/Prescription reissue, record distributor Boomkat praised the album, describing it as incorporating elements of "meditative, Eastern raga drone with sage-like poetry and electro-acoustic phantasmagorias, projecting a plasmic miasma of pharmaceutical shimmer and surreality that's pretty much arch Coil".

== Track listing ==
=== Acme/Prescription 12" version ===
No.	Title	Length
1.	"The Sea Priestess"	14:11
2.	"Second Son Syndrome"	2:47
3.	"I Don't Want to Be the One"	2:45
4.	"The Avatars"	3:21
5.	"The Mothership and the Fatherland"	23:03
Total length:		46:08

=== Threshold House CD version ===
No.	Title	Length
1.	"The Avatars"	3:02
2.	"The Mothership and the Fatherland"	22:24
3.	"2nd Sun Syndrome"	4:16
4.	"The Sea Priestess"	14:10
5.	"I Don't Want to Be the One"	5:48
6.	"MÜ-ÜR"	22:40
Total length:		72:22

== Personnel ==
- John Balance - lyrics, vocals, obsidian mirrors, 'scrim generators'
- Peter Christopherson - Macintosh, finger cymbals
- Drew McDowall - Moog & 'thoughtforms'
- Thighpaulsandra - Mellotron, Hammond & synths
- Gary Ramon - guitar on "I Don't Want to be the One"
