= Musick to Play in the Dark Vol. 1 =

Studio album by Coil
- Released: September 1999
- Genre: Post-industrial; experimental; glitch; ambient; avant-garde
- Length: 60:02
- Label: Chalice
- Producer: Coil

Coil chronology
Astral Disaster (1999)	Musick to Play in the Dark Vol. 1 (1999)	Queens of the Circulating Library (2000)

Professional ratings
Review scores
Source	Rating
AllMusic	4.5/5 stars
Pitchfork	8.4/10
Uncut	9/10

Musick to Play in the Dark Vol. 1 is a studio album by Coil that was released in September 1999. It is the first album in the Musick to Play in the Dark series, with the second volume being released in 2000. It was remastered by Drew McDowall and reissued by Dais Records in 2020.

== Background and concept ==
Musick to Play in the Dark Vol. 1 was one of two albums attributed purely to a style called "moon musick", informed by ambient, glitch, minimalism and kosmische Musik, which signified their change from a "solar" to a "moon" group; the next album to be released in the series would be Musick to Play in the Dark Vol. 2.

Jhonn Balance originally wished to create a cohesive set of liner notes for Musick to Play in the Dark, which ended up only being published on Coil's website at the time. In them, he outlined the meanings of songs: "Are You Shivering?" refers to MDMA trips he took part in with friends, where they "would ask if each other were shivering, as pure doses can make the teeth chatter and the eyesight vibrate", "Broccoli" is "about greens and ancestor worship as revealed to me through spirit discourse with Austin Spare and my grandad (deceased)", and "Strange Birds", built around a found quote, refers to a period when Jhonn "regressed to BIRD MIND and only squawked and chirruped for three worrying days". He stated that Coil had begun creating "lunar consciousness musick", and were "letting in things we shut out before"; "The feminine. The tidal. The cyclical."

== Recording and composition ==
The development of the album began when Coil moved into a new studio, with new equipment including the Optigan (instead of the Mellotron, which they had previously owned but found hard to use) and many vintage drum machines, as well as new software like Pro Tools. Drew McDowall was credited as contributing "very deeply tweaked granular synthesis material", including atmospheric clicks meant to resemble the crackling of fire. Thighpaulsandra's contributions are best heard on "Red Birds Will Fly Out of the East and Destroy Paris in a Night", where he used a Roland SH-101 and a Synton Fenix.

Mark Weddle, writing for Brainwashed, commented that the album features "drone-y organ chords, vocoded vocal snippets, static-y pops and crackles, watery thumps, [...] angelic backing vocals [and] drippings of sound", as well as "flowing arpeggio patterns" and "various natural environment sounds".

== Track listing ==
No.	Title	Length
1.	"Are You Shivering?"	9:40
2.	"Red Birds Will Fly Out of the East and Destroy Paris in a Night"	12:40
3.	"Red Queen"	11:02
4.	"Broccoli"	9:21
5.	"Strange Birds"	7:37
6.	"The Dreamer Is Still Asleep"	9:56
Total length:		60:02

=== Editions ===
The initial CD pressing was limited to 2,000 copies. Approximately 1,000 of those copies that were ordered directly from Coil include a certificate of provenance, numbered and signed by Peter and John. The 12" version of this record features "edited" versions of the songs as they appear on the CD. It was released on translucent white vinyl in an edition of 500. "FOR YVES TANGUY" is etched in side A of the vinyl, and "IT'S JUST A PHASE WE'RE GOING THROUGH" is etched on side B.

== Personnel ==
- Jhonn Balance
- Peter Christopherson
- Thighpaulsandra
- Drew McDowall
