= Cultural Amnesia =

English post-punk music group

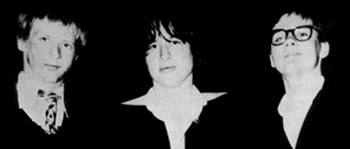
Cultural Amnesia
- Also known as: CA
- Genres: Post-punk, electronic, industrial, art ensemble
- Years active: 1980–1983; 1998–present
- Members: Ben Norland; Gerard Greenway; John Peacock
- Website: http://www.culturalamnesia.com/

Described by Electronic Sound magazine as one of the UK’s “very best tape culture bands”, Cultural Amnesia (CA) are an English post-punk/art-music group, first active between 1980 and 1983 as participants in the so-called cassette culture of the late 1970s and early 1980s in the UK. During this first period the band released three cassette albums: Video Rideo (Con/ventional Tapes, 1981), described recently as “[t]hrillingly inventive, it deftly mixes literary influences with manipulated sounds,” The Uncle of the Boot (Datenverarbeitung, 1983), declared by the label owner in 2025 to be the album he was "most proud of having released", and Sinclair's Luck (Hearsay and Heresy,1983) on English and German record labels, and contributed to a number of the more significant cassette compilation albums of the time. Early on in his career, CA worked with the late Geoff Rushton (John Balance) of Coil, who wrote a number of songs for the band and who was, from the beginning, an essential supporter and enabler, due to his contacts as editor of Stabmental magazine, arranging most of their releases, producing publicity material, and providing constant encouragement. Balance featured the band heavily on his 1982 compilation Endzeit (Datenverarbeitung) and released and designed the artwork (assisted by Peter Christopherson) for their final cassette album of the '80s, Sinclair's Luck, which album he described as "[a] dazzling and perplexing showcase for the group that have so much to offer." The band has become more widely known since 2000 following release of a number of compilations of their early '80s music in which the members of the group have been fully involved. The band reformed in the late '90s with the same personnel and there have been a number of albums and EPs of new material released.

Working in the wake of the early industrial bands, CA's output is diverse, ranging from ambient soundscapes to synthpop, but it can be broadly characterized as song-based electronic music, normally making use of synthesizer, drum machine and guitar. Although the early Industrial bands were an inspiration to CA, and they enjoyed the music, only a small part of their own output falls squarely into the genre. They did not share the Burroughsian/Ballardian melange that tended to characterise the attitudes of the Industrial scene. The three members of the band were occasionally joined for recording and live performance by guitarist, Alastair Murray. The band’s methods of recording, as with many of those involved with the cassette/DIY scene of the post-punk period, were initially extremely primitive, growing more sophisticated as they could afford better equipment. However, CA never recorded in a professional studio of any kind. The members of the band had little interest in punk, but in addition to the inspiration of bands such as Throbbing Gristle and Cabaret Voltaire they enjoyed a broad range of music of the post-punk period; they also listened a great deal to the art rock of the late '60s and '70s, including Krautrock and progressive rock, and had a keen interest in dance music and disco.

Cultural Amnesia stopped activity close to the completion of what was to be their first vinyl LP, Obscenity, with the German company Datenverarbeitung. John Balance's sleeve notes for the unreleased album give a perceptive insight into CA’s body of work (the blurb was published on the inner sleeve of the 2007 compilation LPs, Press My Hungry Button).

What does one say? Cultural Amnesia have never ceased to amaze me with their finely honed songs of innocence and insecticide. Each gleaming tune a button on their hair shirt. There is a raw spirit of experiment, of mis-adventure with emotions, that is almost awkward to listen to. Time shifts and personal twists reveal a complex web of older children, playing with something they know full well is not really for the general public. Using a vocabulary of myths and symbols, along with splintered shards of themselves, caricatures and alter egos weave and parade in drunken 'night on the town' scenarios, in crazy-glass-house confrontations with each other. All life is here. Bitter and sweet. Love, sex behind supermarkets, truth and lies, jealousy and an all-pervading earthy magick. And Death. Having lurked in the herbaceous borders of the DIY cassette scene, earning critical acclaim for their numerous releases, this record now marks the edge of that dark, tangled frustration of a country. Beyond... is another day. – John Balance, the Ides of March 1983

== Reformation and second phase, 1998–present ==
After fifteen years of silence the band produced three new tracks in 1998, and in 2003 launched a website. Their reformation coincided with renewed interest in what has become known as "cassette culture" and the emergence of specialist labels, of which Vinyl On Demand is the best known, dedicated to reissuing on LP and CD material originally released on cassette in the late 1970s and early '80s. Having established the website, the band began to receive inquiries from labels. Enormous Savages (Anna Logue Records), a compilation of material from 1981–1983, was released on LP in the summer of 2007, early sales accompanied by a four-track mini-CD of material recorded 1998–2006. Press My Hungry Button (Vinyl On Demand Records), a 30-track double-LP compilation of 1980–1983 material, was released November 2007, early sales accompanied by a four-track EP of further 1980s material. The CD Enormous Savages Enlarged (Klanggalerie), from April 2009, includes five tracks recorded 2004–07 (these tracks have also been released as the EP Extra Savage (Iron Banana)) and a further '80s track in addition to the material that appeared on the LP. These compilations of 1980s material were very well received in print and online, with Enormous Savages described in The Sound Projector as "a remarkable piece of musical archaeology and certainly one of the reissues of the year," and Press My Hungry Button as "[s]imply extraordinary" (Drexcode). In November 2011 the band released This Is Not Your Shape (Bleak), their first full album of new material since the early 1980s. The album was accompanied by a highly designed A4 lyrics booklet, Verbose Logging, including the songs on the album and others recorded during their second period. A special-edition CD of the album was released September 2012 (Bleak), with an additional track, booklet, postcards and a lapel badge. Three further albums and two EPs of new material have been released subsequently (please see Discography below). Silent since 2017, after eight years the band announced in August 2025 the release of a new album, Did You Hear The Music, on the small Ice Cream For Crow Records. The album is available as a cassette (as 44 years on from their first album, CA return to their original format), as well as digitally. Reviewed in Electronic Sound magazine in November of 2025, Bob Fischer commented, with particular reference to the album's title track, "Did You Hear The Music": “a gorgeous slice of minimalist synthpop and the perfect encapsulation of the group’s unerring balancing act between sardonic pastiche and genuine pop perfection," and in a later feature for the same magazine ("Time Machine"), the same writer described the album as finding “the trio at a new peak, effortlessly combining pristine synthpop with experimental mischief." The band’s post-1998 material does not reproduce their 1980s sound (although it occasionally samples '80s tracks and makes use of unused '80s material), however it remains consistent and characteristic: song-based electronica with guitar, lyrics that seek the listener’s attention, and occasional instrumentals (their 2017 album Super Whippy (Bleak) is entirely instrumental).

In May of 2026, the band announced on social media their intention to reconstruct and release their two unfinished and unreleased 1980s albums, Obscenity (originally intended as an LP for German company Datenverarbeitung) and The Undertow of Evening.

A number of videos for both new and old material have been produced by John Peacock of the band. (Please see the Discography below for further information and references.)

Although the 2007 compilation LPs collected many of the best of the band's 1980s recordings, a considerable amount of material remains unreleased. The band's website, culturalamnesia.com, is an exhaustive source of information on the band's output, released and unreleased, and on the early-'80s milieu in which they were first active. There is also much unreleased material recorded since their 1998 reformation.

John Peacock and Ben Norland (the latter as themilgramobediencetoauthorityexperiment (sic)) are active as solo artists.

== Discography ==
=== Albums and EPs ===
- Video Rideo (Cassette album, Conventional Tapes 1981; Datenverarbeitung 1983)
- Sinclair's Luck (Cassette album, Hearsay and Heresy 1983)
- The Uncle of the Boot (Cassette album, Datenverarbeitung 1983)
- The Undertow of Evening (Album recorded 1982/3, unreleased)
- Obscenity (Album recorded 1982/3, unreleased)
- Enormous Savages (LP, 1980s compilation, Anna Logue Records 2007)
- Little Savage (Mini-CD EP of 1998–2006 tracks, Iron Banana 2007)
- Press My Hungry Button (Double LP, 1980s compilation, VOD Records 2007)
- Still Hungry (EP, 1980s compilation, VOD Records 2007)
- Enormous Savages Enlarged (CD album, 1980s compilation + five post-2000 tracks, Klanggalerie 2009)
- This Is Not Your Shape (File album, Bleak 2011)
- This Is Not Your Shape special edition (CD album, Bleak 2012)
- Bad Meditation (File album, Bleak 2015)
- Ring The Hungry Bell (File EP, 1980s compilation, Bleak 2016)
- Agile Business Practices (File EP, Bleak 2016)
- Laments (File EP, Bleak 2016)
- Super Whippy (File album, Bleak 2017)
- Did You Hear The Music (Cassette + file album, Ice Cream For Crow Records 2025)
- Extra Savage: In the Hands of the Makoh'lenga (File EP of 2004–2007 tracks, Iron Banana 2026)

=== Compilations and other appearances ===
- "Yellow Song" on Standard Response (1979 (Discogs date, in fact 1981))
- "Cyberforms Dub" on Snatch 2 (1980)
- "Repetition For This World", "Reprise", "Dialogue of Skull And Soul" and "Secrets of the Passive Margin" on Endzeit (1982)
- "Colorblind" and "The Pigs Are Coming" on A Sudden Surge of Power (1983)
- "Nobody Does It Like You Do!" on Qu'est-ce Qu'il Y A? (1983)
- "Resthome (The Man Who Worked With Tourists)" on Rising From The Red Sand (Volume Four) (1983)
- "Kingdom Come" on The Angels Are Coming (1983)
- "The Uncle of the Boot" on Band-It 11 (1983)
- "Dance" and "Where Has All The Difference Gone?" on The Best of the Rest (Volume 27/28) (1984/5)
- "Where Has All The Difference Gone?" on On-Slaught No. 6 (1985)
- "Down by the Canal" on Cassette Culture I: Pause And Rewind (2005)
- Various 1980s tracks on Punto de Vanguardia (Point of the Vanguard), Radio Futuro, Chile. DJ Rolando Ramos broadcast a one-hour programme on the history and music of CA (2006)
- "Contains" on Cassette Culture II (2006)
- "I Am Taking Photographs" on Electricity 3 (2006)
- "Resthome (The Man Who Worked With Tourists)" on Nonpop 2 (2008)
- "Repetition For This World" on Messthetics Greatest Hiss: Classics of UK Cassette-Culture DIY, 1979-1982 (volume 1) (2008)
- "Contains", "I Heard It On The Radio”, "It's Coming!" in Salt Magazine No. 2 (2009)
- "Materialistic Man" on The Anna Logue Years (2010)
- "Little Blue Grains" and "Brand New Day" on Why Be Blake When You Can Be Bleak? (2010)
- "Resthome (The Man Who Worked With Tourists)" on Rising From The Red Sand (Volume Four) (LP reissue 2013)
- "Materialistic Man" on Close to the Noise Floor (4xCD, 2016)
- "Materialistic Man" on Close to the Noise Floor (2xLP, 2017)
- Six early-1980s tracks, lyrics written by or featuring as a musician John Balance on The Art & Audio, Works & Writings of Geoffrey Rushton Alias John Balance (8xLP, c. 250-page book, 2024)
- "Do You Remember The War?" on Cold War Electronica (2xCD, Electronic Sound magazine No. 131, November 2025)

Discography sources: Discogs, Tape-Mag, culturalamnesia.com

== See also ==
- John Balance Please see discography for Balance's lyrical and musical contributions to CA
- Cassette culture
- Post-punk
- Electronic music
- Industrial music
