= Chalice (record label) =

British vanity record label

- Founded: 1998-2000, 2006
- Founder: John Balance, Peter Christopherson
- Status: defunct
- Genre: Industrial, Experimental
- Country of origin: United Kingdom
- Location: England

Chalice was a British vanity record label created by Coil, exclusively for albums put out by the group. Its brother labels are Threshold House and Eskaton.

According to the 2006 re-pressings of Musick to Play in the Dark Vol. 1 and 2, Chalice is stationed in Thailand as Peter Christopherson supervised the repressing in Krung Thep, where he lived.

== Releases ==
Catalogue number	Release title	Format	Release date
Graal 001	Foxtrot	CD	1998
Graal 001	Foxtrot	2×10″	1998
Graal 002	Musick to Play in the Dark Vol. 1	12″	1999
Graal 003	Musick to Play in the Dark Vol. 1	CD	1999
Graal 004	Musick to Play in the Dark Vol. 2	2×12″	2000
Graal 005	Musick to Play in the Dark Vol. 2	CD	2000

== See also ==
- List of record labels
- List of electronic music record labels
