= How to Destroy Angels (Remixes and Re-Recordings) =

Remix album by Coil
- Released: 1992
- Genre: Experimental, dark ambient
- Length: 55:13
- Label: Threshold House
- Producer: Coil

Coil chronology
Stolen & Contaminated Songs (1992)	How to Destroy Angels (Remixes and Re-Recordings) (1992)	Airborne Bells/Is Suicide a Solution? (1993)

Professional ratings
Review scores
Source	Rating
AllMusic	2.5/5 stars

How to Destroy Angels (Remixes and Re-Recordings) is a remix album by Coil. All of the songs are remixes from the 12" single of the same name, and features cover artwork by filmmaker Derek Jarman. The remixes were produced by John Balance, Peter Christopherson, and Steven Stapleton of Nurse with Wound. The song "Absolute Elsewhere" is blank and silent, as it was originally released. It is portrayed in this release as a single second of silence.

== Release history ==
The initial pressing of this release is affected by bronzing, a phenomenon common with pressings made by Philips Dupont Optical (PDO) at that time. The surfaces of CDs affected with bronzing change colour from silver to bronze or gold, eventually rendering the CD unplayable.

== Track listing ==
1. "The Sleeper" – 2:01
2. "Remotely" – 16:55
3. "The Sleeper II" – 5:20
4. "Tectonic Plates" – 6:58
5. "Dismal Orb" – 7:32
6. "How to Destroy Angels II" – 16:26
7. "Absolute Elsewhere" – 0:01

== Personnel ==
- John Balance – remixer (tracks 1, 3, 4)
- Peter Christopherson – remixer (tracks 2 and 5)
- Steven Stapleton – remixer (track 6)
- Derek Jarman – cover painting
