= Tamlin =

Tamlin may refer to:

- Tamlin Blake (born 1974), South African mixed media artist
- Tamlin Conner, American–New Zealand psychologist and professor
- The Tamlins, a Jamaican reggae vocal group
- Tam Lin or Tamlin, a character in a Scottish ballad

== See also ==
- Tamlyn, a given name and surname
