= Autumn Equinox: Amethyst Deceivers =

EP by Coil
- Released: 1998
- Genres: Experimental, electronic, post-industrial, ambient
- Length: 23:34
- Label: Eskaton
- Producer: Coil

Coil chronology
Summer Solstice: Bee Stings (1998)	Autumn Equinox: Amethyst Deceivers (1998)	Winter Solstice: North (1999)

Professional ratings
Review scores
Source	Rating
AllMusic	4/5 stars

Autumn Equinox: Amethyst Deceivers is part three of the four part Seasons collective created by Coil.

== Release history ==
This was first released on autumn equinox 1998 as a limited edition of 1,000 7" on dark red vinyl and 40 copies on light blue vinyl. The cdep release was unlimited, but deleted on winter solstice 1998, when the last part of the solstice/equinox series was released. A second edition of the cdep was released on summer solstice 2001 and was limited to 400 copies.

This album was re-released on Moon's Milk (In Four Phases). This album was to be re-released on the cancelled Moon's Milk In Six Phases.

== Track listing ==
=== 7" version ===
Side A

1. "Amethyst Deceivers" – 5:09

Side B

1. "Switches" – 3:11

=== CD version ===
1. "Regel" – 1:16
2. "Rosa Decidua" – 4:55
  - Featuring: Robert Lee, Rose McDowall
3. "Switches" – 4:45
4. "The Auto-Asphyxiating Hierophant" – 5:58
5. "Amethyst Deceivers" – 6:37
