= Queens of the Circulating Library =

Studio album by Coil
- Released: 2 April 2000
- Length: 49:28
- Label: Eskaton ESKATON 20
- Producer: Coil

Coil chronology
Musick to Play in the Dark Vol. 1 (1999)	Queens of the Circulating Library (2000)	Musick to Play in the Dark Vol. 2 (2000)

Alternative cover
- Cover for the 2023 remaster

Professional ratings
Review scores
Source	Rating
AllMusic	3/5 stars

Queens of the Circulating Library is a studio album by the British experimental group Coil, released on 2 April 2000. It is the only release without participation from Peter Christopherson. The lyrics were written by John Balance and spoken by Dorothy Lewis, Thighpaulsandra's mother. The line "It's in the trees, it's coming" that appears in the lyrics is from the 1957 British horror film Night of the Demon, and had previously appeared in sampled form in the song "Hounds of Love" by Kate Bush.

The album was originally released on the date of the Coil Presents Time Machines concert. The original packaging was clear, however a wider issue of the album used pink, c-shell CD cases. No album art was included for this release.

In 2022, Dais Records remastered and reissued the album on vinyl record (in six different colorways, with some having lenticular covers), CD and Bandcamp download. The remaster was done by Josh Bonati, while official cover art was created by Nathaniel Young.

== Track listing ==
No.	Title	Length
1.	"Queens of the Circulating Library"	49:26

== Personnel ==
- John Balance
- Thighpaulsandra
- Dorothy Lewis
