= Eskaton =

British vanity record label

- Founded: 1995–2006
- Founder: John Balance, Peter Christopherson
- Status: defunct
- Genre: Industrial, experimental
- Country of origin: United Kingdom
- Location: England

Eskaton is a defunct vanity record label created by Coil, exclusively for albums put out by the group and their friends. Its brother labels are Threshold House and Chalice. The name came from a French late '70s Zeuhl band, Eskaton, for which the label founders had great respect. It is also an alternative spelling of Eschaton, the end of the world in theology. The concept is referred to in occult circles, and Coil had an unreleased compilation titled "Eschatology."

The record label is often associated with the symbol of the "Chaos Cross" and the "Twisted Chaos Cross", symbols which have appeared on several Coil releases, such as Gold Is the Metal (With the Broadest Shoulders).

== Releases ==
Catalogue number	Artist	Release title	Format	Release date
Eskaton 001	Coil vs The Eskaton	Nasa-Arab	12″	1994
Eskaton 002	Coil vs ELpH	Born Again Pagans	CD	1994
Eskaton 003	ELpH	pHILM #1	10″	1995
Eskaton 004		(came with pHILM #1)	poster	1995
Eskaton 005		(chaosphere badge)	badge	1995
Eskaton 006	ELpH vs Coil	Worship the Glitch	CD	1996
Eskaton 007	ELpH vs Coil	Worship the Glitch	10″	1996
Eskaton 008	Black Light District	A Thousand Lights in a Darkened Room	CD	1996
Eskaton 009	Black Light District	A Thousand Lights in a Darkened Room	2×12″	1996
Eskaton 010	Time Machines	Time Machines	CD	1998
Eskaton 11	Coil	Spring Equinox: Moon's Milk or Under an Unquiet Skull	CD	1998
Eskaton 12	Coil	Spring Equinox: Moon's Milk or Under an Unquiet Skull	7″	1998
Eskaton 13	Coil	Summer Solstice: Bee Stings	7″	1998
Eskaton 14	Coil	Summer Solstice: Bee Stings	CD	1998
Eskaton 15	Coil	Autumn Equinox: Amethyst Deceivers	7″	1998
Eskaton 16	Coil	Autumn Equinox: Amethyst Deceivers	CD	1998
Eskaton 17	Zos Kia / Coil	Transparent	12″	1998
Eskaton 18	Coil	Winter Solstice: North	7″	1999
Eskaton 19	Coil	Winter Solstice: North	CD	1999
Eskaton 20	Coil	Queens of the Circulating Library	CD	2000
Eskaton 21	Thighpaulsandra	Some Head	CD	2000
Eskaton 22		(Backwards watch)	watch	2000
Eskaton 23	Coil	Moons Milk (In Four Phases)	2×CD	2001
Eskaton CD 24	Coil	Coil Presents Time Machines	CD	2000
Eskaton 24	Coil	Constant Shallowness Leads to Evil	CD	2001
Eskaton 25		[unused]		
Eskaton 26	Thighpaulsandra	I, Thighpaulsandra	2×CD	2001
Eskaton 26	Thighpaulsandra	I, Thighpaulsandra	2×12″	2001
Eskaton 27	Thighpaulsandra	The Michel Publicity Window E.P.	CD	2001
Eskaton 27	Thighpaulsandra	The Michel Publicity Window E.P.	7″	2001
Eskaton 28	Time Machines	Time Machines	2×12″	2002
Eskaton 29	Coil	The Golden Hare with a Voice of Silver	2×CD	2002
Eskaton 30	Black Sun Productions	Plastic Spider Thing	CD	2002
Eskaton 31		[unused]		
Eskaton 32	Mount Vernon Astral Temple	Musick That Destroys Itself	CD	2003
Eskaton 32x	Mount Vernon Astral Temple	[untitled]	CD	2003
Eskaton 033	CoH	Love Uncut	CD	2000
Eskaton 34	Coil	ANS	CD-R	2003
Eskaton 077	CoH	Above Air	CD	7 March 2006

== Chaos Cross ==
The symbol of the chaos cross was used almost exclusively in the times of Coil's side projects. It is a dominant symbol which can be found on a number of releases and merchandise.

== See also ==
- Lists of record labels
- List of electronic music record labels
