= All the Pretty Little Horses (album) =

Studio album by Current 93
- Released: 1996
- Recorded: 1995/6
- Genre: Apocalyptic folk, experimental, post-industrial
- Length: 55:30
- Label: Durtro
- Producer: Steven Stapleton, David Tibet, Michael Cashmore

Current 93 chronology
Where the Long Shadows Fall (Beforetheinmostlight) (1995)	All the Pretty Little Horses (1996)	The Starres Are Marching Sadly Home (Theinmostlightthirdandfinal) (1996)

Professional ratings
Review scores
Source	Rating
AllMusic	4/5 stars

All the Pretty Little Horses (TheInmostLightItself) is an album by English band Current 93. It forms the second part of the Inmost Light trilogy; the first being 1995's Where the Long Shadows Fall (Beforetheinmostlight) and the last being 1996's The Starres Are Marching Sadly Home (Theinmostlightthirdandfinal). Unlike its bookends, All the Pretty Little Horses is a full-length album. Like the earlier Of Ruine or Some Blazing Starre, All the Pretty Little Horses contains several songs based on repeating melodic themes. Lyrically, the album revolves around the ideas of pain and death, specifically as reflected in Patripassianist philosophy, along with the overarching concept of the "inmost light", or soul. In contrast, the music itself is some of Current 93's most traditional, relying heavily on acoustic guitar. Exceptions appear in the form of two spoken-word tracks: the ominous, drone-based round "Twilight Twilight Nihil Nihil", and "Patripassian", backed mainly by a heavily treated loop of Carlo Gesualdo's Miserere.

The album opens with "The Long Shadow Falls", a conceptual link and recap of the previous EP, Where the Long Shadows Fall. In this version, John Balance's improvised phrase, "Why can't we all just walk away," is clearly heard instead of nearly inaudible. A hidden track of Thomas Ligotti reading from his story Les Fleurs appears at the end of the album.

Originally available on compact disc and vinyl, the album was reissued as part of the boxed set The Inmost Light in 2007.

== Track listing ==
1. "The Long Shadow Falls" – 2:15
2. "All the Pretty Little Horses" (Traditional) – 2:35
3. "Calling for Vanished Faces I" – 1:50
4. "The Inmost Night" – 2:16
5. "The Carnival Is Dead and Gone" – 3:11
6. "The Bloodbells Chime" – 3:00
7. "Calling for Vanished Faces II" – 4:10
8. "The Frolic" – 8:11
9. "The Inmost Light" – 1:45
10. "Twilight Twilight, Nihil Nihil for Thomas Ligotti, who has seen the bloodbells shine" – 8:22
11. "The Inmost Light Itself" – 9:29
12. "All the Pretty Little Horses" (Traditional) – 2:34
13. "Patripassian" – 5:49

== Participants ==
- David Tibet - vocals, drones, strings and bells
- John Balance - vocals on 1, 10 & 11
- Michael Cashmore - guitar, bass, glockenspiel and piano
- Steven Stapleton - strings 'n' stones, devices 'n' drones
- Timothy d'Arch Smith - vocals on 10
- Lilith - vocals on 5, 7, 8, 9 & 11
- Geoff Cox-Doreé - vocals on 10
- Nick Cave - vocals on 12 & 13
- Joolie Wood - violin, whistle and piano
- David Kenny - guitar and bass
- Salamah binti Isa - vocals on 10
- David Rowlnads - steel guitar

== Additional information ==
- Photographs of all participants from their childhoods are included in the CD booklet.
- The album is dedicated by Tibet as follows: A death and a birth: Dorothy Ann Collins (1933 - 1995) and Seth Joseph Burgess Cox-Dorée (born 1995). I dedicate this album to one past and one future, and to that place where both shall meet. The former is better known as Dolly Collins, sister of Shirley Collins.
- The credits advise that the title "The Frolic" is borrowed, with permission, from Thomas Ligotti. "Twilight Twilight Nihil Nihil" is dedicated to him.
- Lilith is Lilith Stapleton, eldest daughter of Steven Stapleton and Diana Rogerson. She contributed the artwork to Current 93's Horsey (album) CD and inspired Nurse With Wound's Soliloquy For Lilith.
- An alternative version of "The Frolic", entitled "Frolicking", was issued on the compilation album Terra Serpentes, released by World Serpent in 1997.
