= Winter Solstice: North (album) =

EP by Coil
- Released: 1999
- Genre: Experimental
- Length: 25:00
- Label: Eskaton
- Producer: Coil

Coil chronology
Autumn Equinox: Amethyst Deceivers (1998)	Winter Solstice: North (1999)	Astral Disaster (1999)

Professional ratings
Review scores
Source	Rating
AllMusic	4/5 stars

Winter Solstice: North is the final release of the four part seasons collective created by Coil. Vocalists Rose McDowall and Robert Lee contribute to the song "Christmas Is Now Drawing Near", a traditional Catholic song. The song features Rosa Mundi.

This album was re-released on Moon's Milk (In Four Phases).

== Track listing ==
=== 7" version ===
Side A

1. "A White Rainbow" – 5:44

Side B

1. "Christmas Is Now Drawing Near" – 3:30

=== CD version ===
1. "A White Rainbow" – 8:53
2. "North" – 3:45
3. "Magnetic North" – 8:51
4. "Christmas Is Now Drawing Near" – 3:30
