= Stabmental =

Stabmental was a British DIY music and cultural fanzine published in the late 1970s and early 1980s covering industrial and post-punk music and the cassette scene. The moving force, main editor and writer of the publication was Geoffrey Rushton, who would later assume the name John Balance and become known as singer and lyricist of the influential post-industrial band Coil (the following will employ the better-known pseudonym). Balance was still at school during most of the period of the magazine's publication (Lord Williams's School, not – as widely misreported – Oundle School), though he would continue to publish the magazine for a short period after leaving and before his career in music began to take off. The other founding editor was a school friend of Balance's, Tom Craig (Craig would be succeeded as coeditor by another school friend, Euan Craik). The magazine included interviews with, articles on and reviews of releases and performances by many leading alternative bands and solo artists of the time, such as Throbbing Gristle, Cabaret Voltaire, Clock DVA, SPK, Virgin Prunes, Alternative TV, Eyeless in Gaza, Monte Cazazza, and participants in the so-called "cassette culture", such as The Door and the Window, The Good Missionaries, and Cultural Amnesia. The magazine also featured drawings and collages by Balance, sometimes employing the pseudonym Murderwerkers (Balance would use both Stabmental and Murderwerkers as pseudonyms for his earliest musical releases).

Stabmental published seven issues between 1979 and 1982, including one double issue (4/5) and one issue (6) in the form of a cassette-tape compilation entitled The Men with the Deadly Dreams (conceived, compiled and designed by Balance). The photocopied magazine was in stapled A4 format, with text produced on typewriter. The print runs were very limited, certainly not exceeding 500 copies. It sold by mail order and through the London alternative-music shop Rough Trade. The magazine is now a sought-after collector's item. The cover of Stabmental 7, the final issue, included a hand-finished element, with each copy therefore unique – an anticipation of Balance's enthusiasm for handcrafted editions of Coil releases.

An energetic correspondent and mail artist, Balance made many important contacts in the alternative music scene through his work on Stabmental and it is through the magazine that he met his musical and life partner, Peter Christopherson, then of Throbbing Gristle. Balance and Craig were members of the invited audience for the recording of Throbbing Gristle’s 1980 album Heathen Earth.
