= Journal of the International Association of Providers of AIDS Care =

- Discipline: AIDS
- Language: English
- Edited by: Jose M. Zuniga

Publication details
- Former name: Journal of the International Association of Physicians in AIDS Care
- History: 2002-present
- Publisher: SAGE Publications
- Frequency: Bimonthly

Standard abbreviations
- ISO 4: J. Int. Assoc. Provid. AIDS Care

Indexing
- ISSN: 1545-1097 (print); 1557-0886 (web)
- LCCN: 2001243146
- OCLC no.: 475662937

Links
- Journal homepage; Online access; Online archive

The Journal of the International Association of Providers of AIDS Care is a bimonthly peer-reviewed medical journal that covers research on AIDS. The editor-in-chief is Jose M. Zuniga (International Association of Providers of AIDS Care). The journal was established in 2002 and is published by SAGE Publications.

== Abstracting and indexing ==
The journal is abstracted and indexed in:

- CAB Abstracts
- CINAHL
- EBSCO databases
- Global Health
- MEDLINE
- Rural Development Abstracts
- Tropical Diseases Bulletin
