= Spring Equinox: Moon's Milk or Under an Unquiet Skull =

EP by Coil
- Released: March 20, 1998
- Genre: Drone; minimalism; psychedelia
- Length: 16:42
- Label: Eskaton
- Producer: Coil

Coil chronology
Unnatural History III (1997)	Spring Equinox: Moon's Milk or Under an Unquiet Skull (1998)	Summer Solstice: Bee Stings (1998)

Professional ratings
Review scores
Source	Rating
Allmusic	3/5 stars

Spring Equinox: Moon's Milk or Under an Unquiet Skull is a 1998 EP released by Coil as part of the Moon's Milk (In Four Phases) series. Per its title, it was released to celebrate the March equinox on March 20, 1998.

== Background and release ==
The second part of the piece features viola played by William Breeze over the first part of the piece; he subsequently contributed viola to all of the Moon's Milk EPs.

A first edition consisted of a limited 7" of 1000 copies on milky white vinyl and 55 copies on yellow vinyl and a CD-EP, which was deleted on the following Summer solstice, when Summer Solstice: Bee Stings was released. On the Summer solstice of 2001, a second edition of the CD-EP was released, limited to 400 copies.

All four releases in the series were eventually released together in the 2002 two disc compilation Moon's Milk (In Four Phases).

== Track listing ==
1. "Moon's Milk or Under an Unquiet Skull (Part 1)" – 8:32
2. "Moon's Milk or Under an Unquiet Skull (Part 2)" – 8:10
