= Summer Solstice: Bee Stings =

EP by Coil
- Released: 1998
- Recorded: 21 June 1997 – 21 June 1998
- Genre: Experimental
- Length: 24:00
- Label: Eskaton
- Producer: Coil

Coil chronology
Spring Equinox: Moon's Milk or Under an Unquiet Skull (1998)	Summer Solstice: Bee Stings (1998)	Autumn Equinox: Amethyst Deceivers (1998)

Professional ratings
Review scores
Source	Rating
AllMusic	3/5 stars

Summer Solstice: Bee Stings is part two of the four part Seasons collective created by Coil.

== Release history ==
The 7" was limited to 1300 copies on honey yellow vinyl and 50 copies on green vinyl. the CD version was unlimited, but deleted on autumn equinox 1998, when the third part of the series was released. On summer solstice 2001 a second CD edition was released and this was limited to 400 copies.

This album was re-released on Moons Milk (In Four Phases). This album will again be re-released on Moon's Milk In Six Phases.

A remix of "Glowworms/Waveforms" entitled "Glowworms/Waveforms - Obsidian Monarch (Full Version)" by Thread appeared on the CD compilation Otology: The Brainwashed 7" Singles Compiled.

Side A is meant to be played at 45 rpm while side B is meant to be played at 33½ rpm.

== Track listing ==
=== 7" Version ===
Side A

1. "Bee Stings" – 4:56

Side B

1. "Summer Substructures" – 8:11

=== CD Version ===
1. "Bee Stings" – 4:56
2. "Glowworms/Waveforms" – 5:54
3. "Summer Substructures" – 8:11
4. "A Warning from the Sun (For Fritz)" – 5:01
