= Tamlyn =

Tamlyn is a given name and a surname. It may refer to:

- Tamlyn Tomita (born 1966), American actress
- Caroline Tamlyn (born 1955), British swimmer
- Lucy Tamlyn (born 1955), American diplomat

== See also ==
- Tamlin (disambiguation)
