= Born Again Pagans =

EP by Coil vs. ELpH
- Released: 1994
- Genre: Experimental, acid house
- Length: 21:35
- Label: Eskaton
- Producer: Coil

Coil vs. ELpH chronology
Born Again Pagans (1994)	Worship the Glitch (1995)

Born Again Pagans is an extended play attributed to Coil vs. ELpH. "ELpH" is a name Coil attributed to a spiritual entity they felt was communicating with them during recording.

== Background ==
In the CD booklet track one is attributed to Coil and tracks two, three and four are attributed to ELpH. "Protection" is supposed to be the single for the "forthcoming double CD compilation the Sound of Music" due "Spring 1995". However the Sound of Music, a proposed compilation of Coil's soundtrack work, was never released. Recreated versions of the song "Protection" were released as "Simenon" and "Bee Has the Photos" on the Backwards demo. Three official alternate versions of the song "Protection" have also surfaced as bootlegs. Their track timings are: 13:26, 4:36, and 6:28.

"Glimpse" is a version of "pHILM #1".

"pHILM #1" was later released with added vox vocals, on the ELpH single pHILM #1.

A remix of pHILM #1 titled "Philm (Sleeper Mix By COH)" appeared on the CoH album, Москве.

The catalogue number is Eskaton 002.

== Track listing ==
1. "Protection" – 6:55
2. "Glimpse" – 3:32
3. "Crawling Spirit" – 1:54
4. "pHILM #1" – 9:13

"Protection"
Sample of "Protection", taken from the Coil Vs. ELpH album Born Again Pagans
