= Zos Kia =

British musical group

- Origin: London, England
- Genre: Experimental
- Years active: 1982–1985
- Labels: Nekrophile; All The Madmen; Temple
- Spinoffs: Coil
- Past members: John Gosling; John Balance; Peter Christopherson; Alex Binnie

Zos Kia (also credited as Zoskia) was a British musical group initially formed by John "Zos Kia" Gosling along with John Balance. This trio, along with Peter Christopherson on sound, and sometimes other guests, recorded and performed several concerts in 1982 and 1983 under the names Zos Kia and Coil, and some of this material is available on the Coil/Zos Kia release Transparent.

In 1983, Balance and Christopherson left to concentrate on Coil full-time. All material released under the Zos Kia name alone was primarily the work of John Gosling. After retiring the Zos Kia name, Gosling went on to record with Psychic TV and Sugardog and to work solo as Sugar J and Mekon.

The name "Zos Kia" is derived from the Zos Kia Cultus, a system of magic devised by British artist Austin Osman Spare.

== Discography ==
- Transparent as Zos Kia/Coil on CD, CS, 12" vinyl (1984, Nekrophile Rekords; 1997, Threshold House)
- Rape/Thank You on 7" vinyl (1984, All the Madmen Records)
- Be Like Me on 12" vinyl (1985, Temple Records)
- Rape on 12" vinyl (1985, All the Madmen Records)
- That's Heavy Baby (with Sugardog) on 7" and 12" vinyl (1987)
