= Transparent (Coil album) =

Studio album by Zos Kia / Coil
- Released: 1984
- Recorded: 1982–1983
- Length: Cassette: ? CD: 57:23; 12": ?
- Labels: Nekrophile Rekords; Threshold House; Eskaton
- Producer: Coil

Professional ratings
Review scores
Source	Rating
AllMusic	3/5 stars

Transparent is a collaborative release by the English bands Zos Kia and Coil, released in 1984.

== Release history ==
The cassette version was released in 1984 on Nekrophile Rekords with catalogue number NRC 05. The CD version was released in 1997 on the label Threshold House with catalogue number LOCI CD 13. The 12" version of this was released in 1998 on "Eskaton/World Serpent" with catalogue number ESKATON 017.

The vinyl is etched as follows:

- Side A: ZONE OF SOULS
- Side B: KILLED IN ACTION

== Track listing ==
=== Cassette release ===
Side A:

1. "Sicktone"
2. "Baptism of Fire"
3. "Violation"
4. "Poisons"
5. "Truth"

Side B:

1. "Sewn Open [Rehearsal 5.X.1983]"
2. "Sicktone"
3. "Silence & Secrecy (section) [live at Magenta Club, London 5.VIII.1983]"
4. "Truth (version) [8.X.83]"
5. "Stealing the Words [3.VIII.82]"
6. "On Balance [5.V.82]"

(Note: Notes from brainwashed.com: The first five tracks ("Sicktone" to "Truth") form Side 1 of the cassette, which is labelled "Zos Kia. Berlin Atonal. 3.XII.1983". The remainder of the tracks form Side 2, which is credited to "Coil/Zos Kia", and were recorded in 1982/83. The line-up of Coil and Zos Kia were basically identical at this time. The packaging of the first copies of this release was orangish-brown in colour. Subsequent editions were green.)

=== CD release ===
1. "Sicktone" – 5:43
2. "Baptism of Fire" – 5:03
3. "Rape" – 6:09
4. "Poisons" – 2:44
5. "Truth" – 5:46
6. "Sewn Open [Rehearsal 5.X.1983]" – 7:14
7. "Silence & Secrecy (Section) [live at Magenta Club, London 5.VIII.1983]" – 2:05
8. "Here to Here (Double Headed Secret)" – 4:45
9. "Stealing the Words [3.VIII.82]" – 5:14
10. "On Balance [5.V.82]" – 4:45

(Note: Notes from brainwashed.com: "Rape" is the same as "Violation" from the cassette release. "Silence & Secrecy" is shorter than the version on the cassette. The dates listed for "Sewn Open" and "Silence & Secrecy" are incorrect. They should be 5.X.1983 and 5.VIII.1983 respectively. The disc is packaged in a mini LP style cardboard slipcase, and includes a booklet with photos from Coil/Zos Kia performances, text of a Coil Manifesto written by John Balance in 1983, and a transcript of a conversation between John Balance and Peter Christopherson regarding the Coil/Zos Kia performances and recordings.)

=== LP Release ===
Side A:

1. "Sicktone"
2. "Baptism of Fire"
3. "Rape"
4. "Poisons"
5. "Truth"

Side B:

1. "Sewn Open [Rehearsal 5.X.1983]"
2. "Silence & Secrecy (section) [live at Magenta Club, London 5.VIII.1983]"
3. "Here to Here (Double Headed Secret)"
4. "Stealing the Words [3.VIII.82]"
5. "On Balance [5.V.82]"

(Note: Notes from brainwashed.com: Limited edition of 1000 copies on clear vinyl and 140 copies on green vinyl (100 signed and numbered, 40 signed and alphabetized - signatures are John Balance, Peter Christopherson and John Gosling). The dates listed for "Sewn Open" and "Silence & Secrecy" are incorrect. They should be 5.X.1983 and 5.VIII.1983 respectively.Includes a printed insert with most of the contents of the booklet from the CD edition.)
