= All the Pretty Little Horses =

Traditional American lullaby

"All the Pretty Little Horses" (also known as "Hush-a-bye") is a traditional lullaby from the United States. It has inspired dozens of recordings and adaptations, as well as the title of Cormac McCarthy's 1992 novel All the Pretty Horses.

== Origin ==
The song is commonly thought to be of African-American origin.

An early published version is in "A White Dove", a 1903 story for kindergarteners by Maud McKnight Lindsay (1874–1941), a teacher from Alabama and daughter of Robert B. Lindsay. In the story, "a little girl" sings to "her baby brother" what is footnoted as "an old lullaby":

All the pretty little horses,
White and gray and black and bay;
All the pretty little horses,
You shall see some day, some day—
All the pretty little horses.

Dorothy Scarborough's 1925 study On the Trail of Negro Folk-Songs describes the song as "one lullaby which is widely known through the South and which is reported in many varying forms, but with the spirit and the tune practically the same." Scarborough says such lullabies were sung by enslaved mammies to the white children in their care; "the black mother often spent her tenderest love on the white child she nursed" because, while she was in the plantation house, her own children were off in the slave quarters and often sold away. None of Scarborough's versions are named "All the Pretty Little Horses"; most sing of ponies rather than horses, and are innocuous; however, a "somewhat gruesome" one about mules ends "Buzzards and flies / Picking out its eyes, / Pore little baby crying, / Mamma, mamma!". Scarborough then gives other lullabies ("Ole Cow" and "Baa Baa Black Sheep") with similar gruesome endings in which the eyeless animal cries "Mammy" rather than "Mamma".

In the 1934 collection American Ballads and Folk Songs, ethnomusicologists John and Alan Lomax give a version titled "All the Pretty Little Horses" and ending: 'Way down yonder / In de medder / There's a po' lil lambie, / De bees an' de butterflies / Peckin' out its eyes, / De po' lil thing cried, "Mammy!"' The Lomaxes quote Scarborough as to the lullaby's origins.

In 1971, Angela Davis commented on a version similar to the Lomaxes': '"All the Pretty Little Horses" is an authentic slave lullaby; it reveals the bitter feelings of Negro mothers who had to watch over their white charges while neglecting their own children.'

== Lyrics ==
=== Dorothy Scarborough, 1925 ===
Hush a bye, don’t you cry,
Go to sleep, little baby.
And when you wake,
You shall have a cake,
and all the pretty little ponies.

Paint and bay,
sorrel and gray,
All the pretty little ponies.
So hush-a-by, Don't you cry,
Go to sleep, little baby.

Several other variations are also included in Scarborough's book.

=== Additional verse (included in some versions) ===
Way down yonder
In the meadow
Poor little baby crying momma
Birds and the butterflies
Flutter 'round his eyes
Poor little baby crying momma"

Or

Down in the meadow
a wee little lamb
poor thing crying mama
birds and butterflies
flutter round its eyes
poor things crying mama

=== Popular version ===
Hush you bye, Don't you cry
Go to sleep-y, my little ba - by.
When you wake, you shall have
All the pretty lit-tle hor-ses

Blacks and bays, Dap-ples and grays,
Coach and six-a lit-tle hor-ses.

Hush you bye, Don't you cry,
Go to sleep-y lit-tle ba - by
When you wake, you'll have sweet cake, and
All the pret-ty lit-tle hor-ses

A brown and a gray and a black and a bay
and a Coach and six-a lit-tle hor-ses
A black and a bay and a brown and a gray and a Coach
and six-a lit-tle hor-ses. Hush you bye,
Don't you cry, Oh you pret-ty lit-tle ba-by. Go to sleep-y lit-tle
ba-by. Oh you pret-ty lit-tle ba-by.

== Sources ==
- Engle, Robert B. Waltz and David G. The Ballad Index 2011 (accessed May 19, 2025)
- Lomax, John, and Alan Lomax. "All The Pretty Little Horses". New York City: Ludlow Music Inc., 1934.
