= Rose McDowall =

Scottish musician

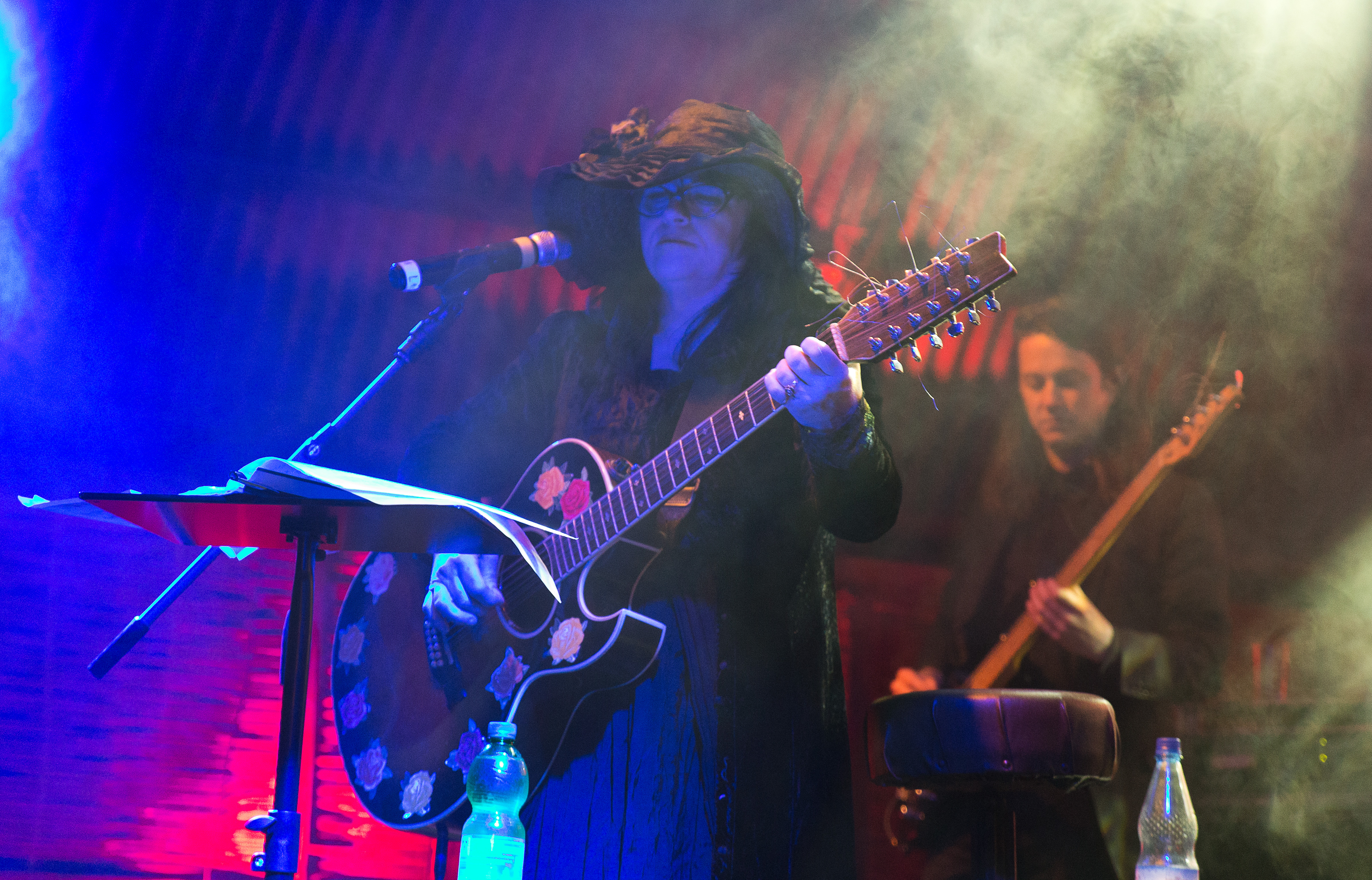
- McDowall in 2015

Background information
- Born: Rose Porter; 21 October 1959 (age 67); Glasgow, Scotland
- Genres: Pop; new wave; neofolk
- Occupations: Singer; musician
- Instruments: Vocals; guitar; keyboards; drums
- Years active: 1978–present

Rose McDowall (née Porter; born 21 October 1959) is a Scottish musician who formed Strawberry Switchblade with Jill Bryson in 1981.

== History ==
McDowall was born in Glasgow, Scotland in 1959. Her first venture into music was in the Poems, an art-punk trio formed in 1978 with her then-husband Drew McDowall. She then formed Strawberry Switchblade in 1981 with Jill Bryson. After signing with Warner Bros. Records, they enjoyed chart success with their single "Since Yesterday" in 1984; however, later singles and an album did not sell as well as expected. This and internal problems led to an acrimonious split in 1986.

For the next six years, McDowall was primarily a guest vocalist or "floating member" of several different alternative bands, particularly in the neofolk genre. She contributed backing or lead vocals for Coil, Current 93, Death in June, Felt, Alex Fergusson, Into a Circle, Megas, Nature and Organisation, Nurse with Wound, Ornamental, Psychic TV and Boyd Rice on recordings as well as singing or playing guitar for live appearances. In 1993, she collaborated with Boyd Rice under the band name Spell, producing two singles and an album of 1960s pop, country and psychedelia covers for Mute Records.

At the same time, she formed a folk rock band called Sorrow with then-husband Robert Lee. Between 1993 and 2001, the band released two albums and one EP through World Serpent Distribution and performed in Europe and the US. During this time, McDowall continued to record and perform with Current 93 and Coil, including the short-lived group Rosa Mundi. Robert Lee left the band in 2002. McDowall and her remaining bandmates continued to perform as Rosa Mundi until 2005 when she began performing under her own name.

McDowall is best known as a vocalist, but also plays guitar, keyboards, melodica, and drums. Her signature instruments are a Washburn 12-string acoustic guitar, a Fender Coronado electric 6-string guitar and an electric harmonium.

== Discography ==
=== Rose McDowall ===
Year	Title	Format, notes
1988	Don't Fear the Reaper	7" and 12" on Rio Digital (unapproved release)
1994	Johnny Remember Me	Pic. 7" on Sympathy for the Record Industry (unapproved release)
2004	Cut with the Cake Knife	CD on Bad Fairy
2005	Alone	CD EP on Durtro – with John Contreras and Nurse with Wound

=== Spell ===
Year	Title	Format, Special Notes
1993	"Big Red Balloon"	Single on Mute Records
1993	Seasons in the Sun	CD on Mute Records

=== Sorrow ===
Year	Title	Format, Special Notes
1993	Under the Yew Possessed	CD on Piski Disc
1999	Sleep Now Forever	CD on Piski Disc
1999	The Final Solstice (I/II)	CD on Piski Disc
2001	Let There Be Thorns	Maxi CD on Piski Disc
2001	Let There Be Thorns	Pic. 7" on Piski Disc

Track appears on:

- Not Alone

=== Nature and Organisation ===
Year	Title	Format, Special Notes
1994	A Dozen Summers Against the World	CD on Durtro
1994	Beauty Reaps the Blood of Solitude	CD on Durtro

=== Backworld ===
Year	Title	Format, Special Notes
1999	Anthems from the Pleasure Park	CD on Harbinger House
2001	The Fourth Wall	CD on Harbinger House – live recording
