= Coil (band) =

English post-industrial band

- Coil, circa 2004. Left to right: John Balance, Peter Christopherson

Background information
- Also known as: Black Light District, ELpH, Time Machines, Sickness of Snakes, The Eskaton
- Origin: London, England
- Genres: Post-industrial; electronic; experimental; avant-garde; avant-pop; psychedelia
- Years active: 1982–2004
- Labels: Some Bizzare; Threshold House; Eskaton; Chalice; Solar Lodge
- Spinoff of: Psychic TV; Zos Kia
- Past members: John Balance; Peter Christopherson; Stephen Thrower; Drew McDowall; William Breeze; Thighpaulsandra; Ossian Brown
- Website: thresholdhouse.com

Coil were an English experimental music group formed in 1982 in London and dissolved in 2005. Initially envisioned as a solo project by musician John Balance (of the band Psychic TV), Coil evolved into a full-time project with the addition of his partner and Psychic TV bandmate Peter Christopherson (formerly of pioneering industrial music group Throbbing Gristle). Coil's work explored themes related to the occult, sexuality, alchemy, and drugs while influencing genres such as gothic rock, neofolk and dark ambient. AllMusic called the group "one of the most beloved, mythologized groups to emerge from the British post-industrial scene."

After the release of their 1984 debut EP How to Destroy Angels, Coil joined Some Bizzare Records, through which they released two full-length albums, Scatology (1985) and Horse Rotorvator (1986). In 1985, the group began working on a series of soundtracks, among them the rejected score for the first Hellraiser film. After departing from Some Bizzare, Coil established their own record label, Threshold House, through which they produced and released Love's Secret Domain (1991). Financial difficulties slowed the group's work in the early 1990s before they returned to the project on releases such as Astral Disaster (1999), and the Musick to Play in the Dark series composed of Vol. 1 (1999) and Vol. 2 (2000), as well as releasing several projects under aliases such as Black Light District, ELpH, and Time Machines.

Balance and Christopherson were the only constant members; other contributors throughout the band's career included Stephen Thrower, Danny Hyde, Drew McDowall, William Breeze, Thighpaulsandra and Ossian Brown. With involvement from these members, the group also started several smaller independent vanity labels, including Eskaton and Chalice. The group's first live performance in 16 years occurred in 1999, and began a series of mini-tours that would last until 2004. Following the accidental death of John Balance on 13 November 2004, Christopherson formally announced that Coil as a creative entity had ceased to exist, ending the Coil discography with The Ape of Naples (2005). Posthumous releases and compilations of unreleased material have since followed this. Christopherson died in 2010.

== History ==
=== 1982–1983: Formation and early years ===
In 1978, John Balance (born Geoff[rey] Burton; also known as Rushton, his stepfather's surname) was a teenage zine journalist, writing—along with his schoolmate Tom Craig, a grandson of Edward Carrick and great-grandson of Edward Gordon Craig—under a moniker Stabmental, through which he published articles on UK underground artists, including seminal industrial bands Throbbing Gristle and Cabaret Voltaire. A Throbbing Gristle fan, Balance had contacted them via mail, and thus befriended the Throbbing Gristle frontperson Genesis P-Orridge. In February 1980, Balance had attended a Throbbing Gristle gig recorded and released as Heathen Earth, where he had first met P-Orridge's bandmate Peter Christopherson and befriended him as well.

Following the dissolution of Throbbing Gristle in 1981, P-Orridge, Christopherson, and Alex Fergusson (formerly of Alternative TV) went on to form the new project, titled Psychic TV, along with the accompanying fellowship titled Thee Temple ov Psychick Youth. Balance, who had attended the University of Sussex for a short time and participated in Brian Williams' Lustmord project, returned in London to live with Christopherson—with whom a romantic partnership had begun. As a Psychic TV member, Balance participated in the recording of the single "Just Drifting" (from the album Force the Hand of Chance) and, the following year, of the album Dreams Less Sweet.

Already having an experience of performing and recording previous to his tenure in Psychic TV, Balance went on to use the name Coil in 1982, originally envisioned for a solo project. In 1983, Balance wrote a manifesto titled The Price of Existence Is Eternal Warfare and sent a tape of the song "On Balance", dated 5 May 1982, to Gary Levermore's label Third Mind Records for an inclusion on a compilation album Rising From The Red Sand; Levermore, however, had rejected the track. Despite this, Balance had recorded three more new tracks—"S for Sleep", "Red Weather", and "Here to Here (Double-Headed Secret)"—on 11 May 1983. On 4 August 1983, Coil—as the duo of Balance and Christopherson—had played its first gig in London at the Magenta Club, during a screening of films by Cerith Wyn Evans and Derek Jarman. Since Christopherson's commitments for Psychic TV—in which he had become disillusioned due to growing conflict with P-Orridge—still limited his participation in Coil, Balance approached John Gosling, another Psychic TV member, who fronted his own project, Zos Kia. Balance's and Gosling's collaboration resulted in the next three gigs during 1983, with the last one being performed in December on Berlin Atonal festival, where Balance participated as both Psychic TV and Coil member. The recordings from aforementioned gigs, as well as "On Balance", were later included on Zos Kia/Coil split album Transparent, released in February 1984 by Austrian label Nekrophile Records. Since January 1984, Balance and Christopherson had departed from Psychic TV and Temple ov Psychic Youth, in order to make Coil as a full-time concern.

=== 1984–1986: How to Destroy Angels and Some Bizzare years ===
The band's official recording debut, an extended play titled How to Destroy Angels, was released on the Good Friday (20 April) of 1984 by a Belgian-based label L.A.Y.L.A.H. Antirecords. Recorded on 19 February 1984 at Britannia Row Studios, the album was dedicated to Mars as the god of spring and war, using predominantly iron and steel instruments.

Shortly after in May 1984, Coil went on to record their first full-length studio album, eventually titled Scatology, approaching JG Thirlwell as a co-producer and co-composer; several others contributors, including Stephen Thrower, Alex Fergusson and Gavin Friday, took part in its recording. Scatology's themes echoed those of How to Destroy Angels, while focusing mainly on alchemy as an idea of transforming matter.

Scatology was released in early 1985 with a 1984 copyright date by the band's own label, Force & Form, and K.422 (a Some Bizzare Records sublabel), to mainly positive feedback. Shortly after, a single featuring a remix of "Panic" and a cover of "Tainted Love" was released, with the profits being donated to the Terrence Higgins Trust; hailed since then as the first AIDS benefit music release, it was supported with the "Tainted Love" video directed by Christopherson, which was purchased by The Museum of Modern Art in New York, U.S.

Horse Rotorvator followed in 1986 as the next full-length release. Although songs such as "The Anal Staircase" and "Circles of Mania" sound like evolved versions of Scatology material, the album is characterized by slower tempos, and represented a new direction for the group. The album has a darker theme than previous releases, according to Balance:

Horse Rotorvator was this vision I'd had of this mechanical/flesh thing that ploughed up the earth and I really did have a vision of it—a real horrible, burning, dripping, jaw-like vision in the night ... The Four Horsemen of the Apocalypse killed their horses and use their jawbones to make this huge earth-moving machine."

The artwork features a photograph of the location of a notorious IRA bombing, in which a bomb was detonated on a military orchestra pavilion. Horse Rotorvator was in part influenced by the AIDS-related deaths of some of their friends. Furthermore, the song "Ostia (The Death of Pasolini)" is about the mysterious death of Pier Paolo Pasolini, as well as what Balance described as "the number one suicide spot in the world", the white cliffs of Dover.

=== Gold Is the Metal... and Unnatural History (1986–1990) ===
After the release of Horse Rotorvator, Coil left Some Bizzare Records, since they fell out with its owner Stevo Pearce. Gold Is the Metal (With the Broadest Shoulders) followed as a full-length release in 1987, marking the beginning of the band's own label, Threshold House—the album is described in the liner notes as "not the follow-up to Horse Rotorvator, but a completely separate package – a stopgap and a breathing space – the space between two twins", which refers to Horse Rotorvator and Love's Secret Domain.

The 13-track Unnatural History compilation was then released on Threshold House in 1990. The first three songs on the album were first released as one half of the Nightmare Culture mini-album.

=== Love's Secret Domain (1991–1992) ===
Love's Secret Domain (abbreviated LSD) followed in 1991 as the next "proper" Coil album, although a few minor releases had been produced since Horse Rotorvator. LSD represents a progression in Coil's style and became a template for what would be representative of newer waves of post-industrial music, blended with their own style of acid house. Although the album was more upbeat, it was not intended as a dance record, as Christopherson explained "I wouldn't say it's a party atmosphere, but it's more positive." "Windowpane" and a Jack Dangers remix of "The Snow" were released as singles, both of which had music videos directed by Christopherson. The video for "Windowpane" was shot in the Golden Triangle, where, Balance claimed, "the original Thai and Burmese drug barons used to exchange opium for gold bars with the CIA." Christopherson recalled "John [Balance] discovered while he was performing that where he was standing was quicksand! In the video you can actually see him getting deeper and deeper." Furthermore, Thai friends of the group commented that they had known of several people that died where Coil had shot footage for the music video.

A music video for the song "Love's Secret Domain" was also shot, which was initially unreleased due to its nature: as Christopherson explained, "We shot 'Love's Secret Domain' in a go-go boy bar in Bangkok; with John [Balance] performing on stage with about 20 or 30 dancing boys, which probably won't get played on MTV, in fact!" As of January 2015, the music video is viewable on more than one YouTube channel. Stolen & Contaminated Songs followed as a full-length release in 1992. However, as with Gold Is the Metal..., it is a collection of outtakes and demos from the LSD era.

=== Soundtracks and side projects (1993–1998) ===
Coil separated their works into many side projects, publishing music under different names and a variety of styles. The pre-Coil aliases, Zos Kia and Sickness of Snakes (a collaboration with Boyd Rice), formed the foundation of a style that would evolve to characterize their initial wave of releases.

Before embarking on their second wave of side projects and pseudonyms, Coil created a soundtrack for the movie Hellraiser, although they withdrew from the project when they suspected their music would not be used. Furthermore, Coil claimed inspiration for Pinhead was partly drawn from the piercing magazines that director Barker borrowed from the group. Balance explained after the release of Stolen and Contaminated Songs, in around 1992:

Yeah it would have been brilliant but we wouldn't have carried on, because they were changing everything and they weren't being very nice to us, the actual film people. They were keeping us in the dark a lot. We said we'd had enough just at the same time they decided they wanted to use Howard Shore. They just wanted normal film music. They didn't want anything too scary which is sad and ridiculous for a horror film.

Also in 1992, Threshold House released a "Remixes And Re-Recordings" version of How to Destroy Angels. Nurse with Wound's Steven Stapleton contributed a remix of the song, "How To Destroy Angels II".

In 1993, Coil contributed music to Derek Jarman's film Blue. Their 1985 score for Jarman's The Angelic Conversation was released on CD in 1994. In 1995, Coil and Lee Ranaldo created the original soundtrack for Todd Verow's Frisk, an adaptation of Dennis Cooper's novel of the same name. In addition, they recorded soundtracks for the documentary Gay Man's Guide to Safer Sex as well as Sarah Dales Sensuous Massage.

Much like the pre-Coil aliases, Coil's series of side projects represented a diverse basis from which the group evolved a different style of sound. While Nasa Arab—credited to the group's project "The Eskaton"—was Coil's farewell to the acid house genre, the following projects, ELpH, Black Light District, and Time Machines, were all based heavily on experimentation with drone, an ingredient that would define Coil's following work. These releases also launched the start of Coil's new label Eskaton.

Transparent was reissued in CD format in 1997 on Threshold House. A disc and booklet were packaged in a "thick" slipcase, which was released in partnership with the World Serpent music company.

=== Late Coil (1998–2004) ===
After the wave of experimental side projects, Coil's sound was completely redefined. Before releasing new material, the group released the compilations Unnatural History II, Windowpane & The Snow and Unnatural History III. In March 1998, Coil began to release a series of four singles which were timed to coincide with the equinox and solstices of that year. The singles are characterized by slow, drone-like instrumental rhythms, and electronic or orchestral instrumentation. The first single, Spring Equinox: Moon's Milk or Under an Unquiet Skull, featured two versions of the same song, the second version of which included an electric viola contribution from a newly inducted member, William Breeze. The second single, Summer Solstice: Bee Stings, also featured performances by Breeze, and also included the industrial-noise song "A Warning from the Sun (For Fritz)", which was dedicated to a friend of Balance and Christopherson's who had committed suicide earlier that year. The third single, Autumn Equinox: Amethyst Deceivers, includes the track "Rosa Decidua", which features vocals by Rose McDowall. The single also features the song "Amethyst Deceivers", later reworked and performed throughout most of Coil's tour—it was eventually re-made into an alternate version on the LP The Ape of Naples. The fourth single, Winter Solstice: North, also includes a track sung by McDowall, and is partially credited to the side project Rosa Mundi. The series would later be re-released as the double-CD set, Moon's Milk (In Four Phases).

Astral Disaster was created with the assistance from new band member Thighpaulsandra, and was released in January 1999 via Sun Dial member Gary Ramon's label, Prescription. Although the album was initially limited to just 99 copies, it would later be re-released in a substantially different form. Musick to Play in the Dark Vol. 1 followed in September 1999, and a few months later Coil performed their first concert in 16 years. In 2025 the label Infinite Fog released Astral Disaster (The Definitive Edition) in various formats.

Queens of the Circulating Library followed in April 2000, with production credit given to Thighpaulsandra. The single-track, full-length drone album is the only Coil release made without the assistance of Christopherson. Musick to Play in the Dark Vol. 2 followed in September 2000, and Coil began to perform live more intensively, a period that also included writing the music for Black Antlers in between a series of mini-tours. Coil also released a series of live albums around this time. Constant Shallowness Leads to Evil, a noise-driven experimental album reminiscent of Christopherson's work with Throbbing Gristle, was first sold at a live performance in September 2000. Coil finally released Black Antlers in June 2004.

In contrast to many of their earlier releases, Coil's later material is characterized by a slower sound which relies more on drone than acid house. This change in sound was reflected in their live performances, as songs like "Ostia" and "Slur" were slowed down from their original pace, as well as re-recordings of "Teenage Lightning" and "Amethyst Deceivers" that were later released on The Ape of Naples.

=== Coil Live ===
Coil's live incarnation is associated with a distinct legacy. The first live shows took place in 1983, but after only four performances, 15 years would pass before they would play live again.

On 14 December 1999, Coil performed elph.zwölf at Volksbuehne in Berlin. Although the performance lasted just under 18 minutes, it marked the beginning of a new era of live performances. Coil would go on to perform close to 50 additional concerts, with varied set lists as well as performers.

Coil performed twice at the Royal Festival Hall in 2000. The first concert was in April, as part of a weekend curated by Julian Cope, when they first performed as the full band line-up – and wearing the "fluffy suits" that would become a staple of live performances for the first time – performing Time Machines. They performed again in September, sharing a bill with Jim Thirlwell (as Foetus) on that occasion. Both performances were full sets.

Coil's performances were surrealistic visually and audibly. The signature fluffy suits, an idea inspired by Sun Ra, played a foremost role at the live shows. The suits would later be used as album covers for the release Live One, while other costumes appear on the covers of Live Two and Live Three—straitjacket and mirror-chested hooded jumpsuit, respectively. Video screens projected footage and animations created by Christopherson, while fog machines created an eerie atmosphere. Balance would often screech and howl during performances, which would add to the effect.

The band's performance at the 2003 All Tomorrow's Parties festival was released as ...And the Ambulance Died in His Arms. Released on Threshold House in 2005 as a digipak, a Thai version was released the following year. ...And the Ambulance Died in His Arms was released under a name chosen by Balance before his death in November 2004.

Many Coil performances were released, including the widely available releases of Live Four, Live Three, Live Two, Live One and ...And the Ambulance Died in His Arms, as well as several very limited editions, such as Selvaggina, Go Back into the Woods and Megalithomania!. Video recordings of several concerts were released on the DVD box set, Colour Sound Oblivion, in 2010.

Coil's final performance was on 23 October 2004, at DEAF (Dublin Electronic Arts Festival), Dublin City Hall in Ireland.

=== Deaths of Balance and Christopherson ===
Balance died on 13 November 2004, after he fell from a second-floor landing in his home. Christopherson announced Balance's death on the Threshold House website, and provided details of the circumstances of the death. Balance's memorial service was held near Bristol on 23 November 2004, and was attended by approximately 100 people.

The final studio album, The Ape of Naples, was released on 2 December 2005. In August 2006, the rare CD-R releases The Remote Viewer and Black Antlers were "sympathetically remastered" and expanded into two-disc versions, which included new and recently remixed material. A comprehensive 16-DVD boxset, titled Colour Sound Oblivion, was released in July 2010. A "Patron Edition" was pre-orderable in November 2009 and sold out in three hours. Christopherson also discussed the possibility of releasing Coil's entire back catalogue on a single Blu-ray disc.

In November 2006, the official Coil website posted the following announcement: "Following the success of Thai pressings of The Remote Viewer and Black Antlers, and after many requests, we are planning to expand the CD catalog still further." A few days later Duplais Balance and Moon's Milk in Six Phases were announced. Furthermore, an expanded vinyl version of The Ape of Naples, which includes the album The New Backwards, has been released, and a two-disc version of Time Machines has been announced.

Six years after the death of Balance, Christopherson died in his sleep on 24 November 2010 in Bangkok, Thailand.

== Artistry ==
=== Style, instruments and creative methods ===
While their work became increasingly difficult to describe as their career progressed, Coil's musical style encompassed genres such as industrial music, noise music, ambient music and dark ambient, neofolk, spoken word, drone music and minimalism. They often considered their works more as magical rituals than as musical pieces; Balance explicitly referred to this approach as "magickal music". Balance described the first half of the Coil discography as "solar" and their later work as "moon musick".

Coil incorporated many exotic and rare instruments into their recordings and performances. The group expressed particular interest in vintage electronic instruments including the Moog synthesizer, the ANS synthesizer, the Mellotron and the Optigan. During Coil's later period, marimba player Tom Edwards joined the group, and performed on the live albums Live Two and Live Three, as well as on the studio albums Black Antlers and The Ape of Naples.

Often ensuing from improvisation and intuition, Coil utilized experimental techniques such as the cut-up technique, ritual drug use, sleep deprivation, lucid dreaming, tidal shifts, John Dee-like methods of scrying, technical glitches, SETI synchronization and chaos theory.

=== Releases ===
Coil's distribution sometimes included releasing limited editions of albums, thereby making them collector's items among fans. Including quirks such as "art objects", sigil-like autographs and even stains of blood in the packaging of their albums, Coil claimed that this made their work more personal for true fans, turning their records into something akin to occult artifacts. This practice was markedly increased in the later half of Coil's career. Due to this, critics accused Coil and its record company of price gouging. However, Balance expressed interest in having regular Coil albums in every shop that wanted them. In 2003, Coil began re-releasing many rare works, mostly remixed. They also launched a download service, where a large amount of their out-of-print music was made available.

=== Religious views ===
Coil held pagan and alchemical beliefs, as well as a fixation on chaos magic, but were sometimes labelled as Satanic. Balance explicitly referred to himself as a "Born Again Pagan", and described his paganism as a "spirituality within nature." Christopherson, however, described the beliefs of Coil as unassociated:

We don't follow any particular religious dogma. In fact, quite the reverse, we tend to discourage the following of dogmas, or false prophets, as it were. And we don't have a very sympathetic view of Christians up to this point. The thing we follow is our own noses; I don't mean in a chemical sense.

=== Members ===
- John Balance was the founder of Coil and was the primary vocalist and composer of Coil's music.
- Peter Christopherson was the chief producer.
- Stephen Thrower worked as a full-time member of Coil from 1987 to 1992.
- Danny Hyde was periodically involved as co-author, collaborator, studio engineer, remixer, and producer. Peter Christopherson called him Coil's 3rd secret member.
- Drew McDowall began collaborating with Coil in 1990 and was officially inducted in 1995. He left the group sometime between 1999 and 2000.
- Rose McDowall, Drew's ex-wife, provided vocals for several Coil tracks including "Wrong Eye", "Rosa Decidua" and "Christmas Is Now Drawing Near". She also collaborated with Coil for the short-lived project Rosa Mundi.
- Ossian Brown had been a Coil collaborator since about 1992 and joined the group in 2000, touring extensively with them and working on several recordings up until the final Coil album The Ape of Naples.
- William Breeze was Coil's electric viola player between 1997 and 2000.
- Thighpaulsandra became an official member on 26 January 1999 and participated until the final album, The Ape of Naples. Most notably, he created the entire instrumental for the album Queens of the Circulating Library.
- John Gosling performed with the initial live incarnation of Coil, as featured on Transparent.
- Tom Edwards of Spiritualized participated in Coil's live incarnation, and was Coil's marimba player from 2000 on.
- Cliff Stapleton played hurdy-gurdy on several live performances, as well as in the studio for Coil at various points throughout the 2000s.
- Massimo & Pierce of Black Sun Productions were members of Coil Live in 2002. However, they were stage performers, never contributing musically other than reading the poetic introduction to "Ostia" during live performances.
- Mike York was part of the Coil Live collective for a limited time.

== Influences and legacy ==
Although Coil expressed interest in many musical groups, they rarely, if ever, claimed to be influenced by them. Coil explicitly stated the influence of such non-musical sources as William Burroughs, Aleister Crowley, Brion Gysin and Austin Spare. Furthermore, the group were friends with Burroughs and owned some of Spare's original artwork.

Balance encouraged fans to trade, discuss and discover new and different forms of music, stressing the importance of variety. Music that Coil expressed interest in is diverse and wide-ranging, from musique concrète to folk music to hardcore punk to classical to techno. Among the musicians Coil expressed interest in were early electronic, experimental and minimalist artists: Harry Partch, La Monte Young, Karlheinz Stockhausen (once referred to by Balance as "an honorary member of Coil"), Alvin Lucier, and Arvo Pärt. Coil also expressed interest in krautrock groups including Cluster, Amon Düül II, Can, Kraftwerk and Tangerine Dream. Rock musicians and groups Coil have expressed interest in are: Angus Maclise, Captain Beefheart, Flipper, Leonard Cohen, Lou Reed, Nico, Pere Ubu, Butthole Surfers, Napalm Death, The Birthday Party, The Velvet Underground and The Virgin Prunes. Coil expressed an interest in the Russian composer Igor Stravinsky, and used a sample from his ballet Rite of Spring on the Horse Rotorvator song "The Anal Staircase". Furthermore, on the album Black Antlers Coil dedicated a song to Sun Ra and covered a song by Bam Bam.

Coil's influence on electronic music has become more evident since the death of Balance, with electronic musicians from all over the world collaborating on a series of tribute albums. Some notable artists who appear on these albums are Alec Empire, Chris Connelly and KK Null ("...It Just Is"). Nine Inch Nails frontman Trent Reznor also expressed the significant influence that the group had on his work in February 2014:

[Coil's] 'Tainted Love' video remains one of the greatest music videos of all time. I was always more attracted to Coil than Throbbing Gristle; the darkness and the scatology really chimed with me. If it's not immediately obvious: Horse Rotorvator was deeply influential on me. What they did to your senses. What they could do with sound. What Jhonn was doing lyrically. The exotic darkness of them permeated their work.

The track "At the Heart of It All" (found on Scatology) later lent its name to an Aphex Twin track on the Nine Inch Nails remix album Further Down the Spiral; Coil also provided remixes for Further Down the Spiral as well as "Gave Up" on the remix album Fixed. Furthermore, in 2010, Reznor, Mariqueen Maandig and Atticus Ross started a new band called How to Destroy Angels—named after the Coil song—which received Christopherson's blessing after Reznor made contact with him.

== Discography ==
Coil's rapid musical output over two decades resulted in a large number of releases, side projects and remixes as well as collaborations.

Primary, full-length, Coil studio albums

- Scatology (1984)
- Horse Rotorvator (1986)
- Gold Is the Metal (With the Broadest Shoulders) (1987)
- Love's Secret Domain (1991)
- Stolen & Contaminated Songs (1992)
- Worship the Glitch (1995, as "ELpH vs. Coil")
- A Thousand Lights in a Darkened Room (1996, as "Black Light District")
- Time Machines (1998, as "Time Machines")
- Astral Disaster (1999)
- Musick to Play in the Dark Vol. 1 (1999)
- Queens of the Circulating Library (2000)
- Musick to Play in the Dark Vol. 2 (2000)
- Constant Shallowness Leads to Evil (2000)
- The Remote Viewer (2002)
- The Restitution of Decayed Intelligence (2003)
- Black Antlers (2004)
- The Ape of Naples (2005)
- The New Backwards (2008)
