= John Balance =

English musician and poet (1962–2004)

Background information
- Also known as: Jhonn Balance; Jhon Balance
- Born: Geoffrey Laurence Burton; 16 February 1962; Mansfield, Nottinghamshire, England
- Died: 13 November 2004 (aged 42) Weston-super-Mare, Somerset, England
- Genres: Industrial; post-industrial; ambient; electronic; acid house; drone; noise
- Occupations: Musician; poet
- Instruments: Vocals; synthesizer; found objects; keyboards; bass guitar; Chapman stick; guitar; violin; egg slicer ('mini-harp')
- Years active: 1979–2004
- Labels: Chalice; Threshold House; Eskaton

Geoffrey Nigel Laurence Rushton (16 February 1962 – 13 November 2004), better known under the pseudonyms John Balance or the later variation Jhonn Balance, was an English musician, occultist, artist and poet.

He was best known as a co-founder of the experimental music group Coil, in collaboration with his partner Peter "Sleazy" Christopherson. Coil was active from 1982 to Balance's death in 2004. He was responsible for the majority of Coil's vocals, lyrics and chants, along with synthesizers and various other instruments both commonplace and esoteric.

Outside Coil he collaborated with Cultural Amnesia (at the beginning of the 1980s), Nurse with Wound, Death in June, Psychic TV, Current 93, Chris & Cosey, Thighpaulsandra, and produced several Nine Inch Nails remixes.

== Early life and career ==
John Balance was born Geoffrey Laurence Burton in Mansfield, Nottinghamshire. He took the surname "Rushton" from his stepfather. During his teens, Balance became acquainted with Christopherson as a fan of the latter's group Throbbing Gristle. The duo were both members of Psychic TV, Christopherson's next project after Throbbing Gristle. They eventually quit Psychic TV to form Coil.

Balance was extremely active as a youth and in his early twenties. Apart from his early musical releases and involvement in bands before Coil, he published seven issues of a fanzine, Stabmental, and was a tireless correspondent with members of the alternative musical and cultural scene in the UK and also abroad. He also released three compilation albums of music by bands and artists about which he was enthusiastic: Endzeit, Bethel and The Men with the Deadly Dreams. The compilations are today collector's items and fetch high prices. Also from his youth, Balance was an avid occultist, maintaining a lifelong interest in the likes of Aleister Crowley and Austin Osman Spare.

== Death ==
On 13 November 2004, during a period of heavy drinking, Balance fell from a two-storey balcony at his home and died that evening in the hospital. Peter Christopherson announced Balance's death on the Threshold House website, and provided details surrounding the accident. Balance's memorial service was held near Bristol on 23 November, and was attended by approximately 100 people. November 2014 saw the publication of a retrospective volume of his art called "Bright Lights and Cats with No Mouths" by Edition Timeless. Timeless published a further archival book of a collection of Balance's notebooks "The Cupboard under the Stars" edited by Claus Laufenburg in 2023.

== Discography ==
Balance first recorded using the alias "Murderwerkers". The Murderwerkers track, "Blue Funk (Scars for E)", was included on the Sterile Records cassette compilation Standard Response. Balance also published an underground zine, Stabmental, and released a track, "A Thin Veil of Blood", also using the nom de guerre Stabmental. "A Thin Veil of Blood" was included on the cassette compilation Deleted Funtime – Various Tunes for Various Loons. Balance then joined up with Peter Christopherson and Boyd Rice to record Nightmare Culture under the moniker "The Sickness of Snakes". Balance subsequently joined Psychic TV and performed alongside Christopherson; however in 1984, Balance and Christopherson left the group to develop Coil. A short collaboration with Zos Kia produced the split tape Transparent. Credit for the album was shared, and marked Coil's first release. The original Coil / Zos Kia tape, Transparent, was released as a "His-Storical" CD reissue in 1997.

During Coil's 23-year career, Balance collaborated with a number of his peers, including Jim Thirlwell/Clint Ruin (Foetus), Marc Almond, Thighpaulsandra, NON, Current 93, and CoH; appearing on many of these artists' albums.

=== With Psychic TV ===
- Dreams Less Sweet
- Just Drifting
- Berlin Atonal Vol. 2
- N.Y. Scum
- Mein-Goett-In-Gen

=== Other groups ===
- Murderwerkers: "Blue Funk (Scars for E)" on Sterile Records compilation Standard Response. (1979)
- Stabmental: "A Thin Veil of Blood" on compilation Deleted Funtime - Various Tunes for Various Loons. (1980)
- Sickness of Snakes: Nightmare Culture (1985)
- Rosa Mundi: "The Snow Man" on compilations The Final Solstice, The Final Solstice II and split album Grief. (1999)

=== Other contributions ===
Date of first pressing	Song title	Album	Group name released under	Musical Role
1981		The Men with the Deadly Dreams	(various)	conceived, commissioned and edited compilation, released as a number of Stabmental fanzine
1981	"Words from a Radio"	The Men with the Deadly Dreams	A House	tapes, effects
1981	"Yellowsong"	Video Rideo	Cultural Amnesia	organ and violin
1982		Endzeit	(various)	conceived, commissioned and edited compilation
1983		Bethel	(various)	conceived, commissioned and edited compilation
1983	"Here to Go"	Sinclair's Luck	Cultural Amnesia	wrote lyrics, also designed packaging (with assistance of Peter Christopherson) and wrote sleeve notes for album
1983	"Scar for E"	The Uncle of the Boot	Cultural Amnesia	wrote lyrics
1983		Music for Hashashins	Vagina Dentata Organ	created wolf growl sample (along with Peter Christopherson) and helped in the recording process of the album
1984 January		LAShTAL	Current 93	featuring
1985		Bar Maldoror	Current 93	bass guitar, miscellaneous
1985		Live at Bar Maldoror: Gyllensköld, Geijerstam And Friends	Nurse with Wound	featuring
1985		The Sylvie and Babs Hi-Fi Companion	Nurse with Wound	featuring
1986		Happy Birthday Pigface Christus	Current 93	featuring
1986		In Menstrual Night	Current 93	featuring
1987	"Europa: The Gates of Heaven"	To Drown a Rose	Death in June	vocals
1987	"We Are The Lust"	Brown Book	Death in June	co-wrote and appears on track
1987		Dawn	Current 93	bass guitar, miscellaneous
1987		Imperium	Current 93	
1988		Earth Covers Earth	Current 93	performer
1988	"Anti-Christ Anti-Christian"	Peyrere	Current 93	performer
1988		Swastikas for Noddy	Current 93	featuring
1988		The Red Face of God	Current 93	featuring
1989		Crooked Crosses for the Nodding God	Current 93	vocals
1991		A Document of Early Acoustic & Tactical Experimentation	Lustmord	featuring
1992	"LAShTAL", "Salt"	Nature Unveiled	Current 93	performer
1992	"All the Stars Are Dead Now", "Rosy Star Tears from Heaven"	Thunder Perfect Mind	Current 93	vocals
1993		The Nodding Folk	The Apocalyptic Folk in the Nodding God Unveiled	
1993	"Great Black Time I (Excerpt)", "Sucking Up Souls (Excerpt)", "Great Black Time II (Excerpt)", "Great Black Time III (Excerpt)", "Maldoror Is Ded Ded Ded Ded"	Emblems: The Menstrual Years	Current 93	featuring
1993	"Hitler as Kalki (SDM)", "Christ and the Pale Queens Mighty in Sorrow"	Hitler as Kalki	Current 93	featuring
1994	"Lucifer Over London Parts I & II"	Lucifer Over London	Current 93	vocals
1995	"Where the Long Shadows Fall (Beforetheinmostlight)"	Where the Long Shadows Fall (Beforetheinmostlight)	Current 93	vocals
1996	"The Long Shadow Falls", "Twilight Twilight Nihil Nihil", "The Inmost Light Itself"	All the Pretty Little Horses	Current 93	vocals
1998	"To Drown a Rose"	Kameradschaft	Death in June	provides vocals, this is an outtake version of the song
1999	"Grief"	Borderlands	Tactile	provides vocals
1999	"The Snow Man"	The Final Solstice	Rosa Mundi	provides vocals
1999	"Lucifer over London"	Calling for Vanished Faces	Current 93	vocals
1999	"Misery Farm"	Misery Farm	Current 93	featuring
2000	"Silence Is Golden"	Vox Tinnitus	CoH	wrote lyrics
2000 March 1	"Black Nurse", "Tudor Fruits"	Some Head EP	Thighpaulsandra	vocals
2001	"Love's Septic Domain (Health & Deficiency)"	Love Uncut	CoH	provides vocals, duet with Louise Weasel
2001		Cats Drunk on Copper	Current 93	featuring
2001 August 6	"Fouled"	The Michel Publicity Window E.P.	Thighpaulsandra	"vocals and text", album art
2001	"Optical Black"	I, Thighpaulsandra	Thighpaulsandra	"vocals and text"
2003 June 23	"He Tastes of the Sea"	Double Vulgar	Thighpaulsandra	featuring
2004	"Lucifer Over London"	Sixsixsix Sicksicksick	Current 93	vocals
2004	"E2 = Tree 3"	Toilet Chants	Black Sun Productions	provides vocals
2005	"Fj Nettlefold", "Make Room for the Mushrooms"	A Nature of Nonsense	Aural Rage	vocals, written by
2005	"A List of Wishes"	operettAmorale	Black Sun Productions	vocals
2005 December 23	"Christ's Teeth"	...It Just Is	Thighpaulsandra	vocals
2006 February	"Star Malloy"	Not Alone	Thighpaulsandra	ARP 2600 synthesizer
2006 July 1	"A Tree Now"	The Impossibility of Silence	Black Sun Productions	provides vocals (howling)
2007 July	"Fetish for Today", "Scars for E", "Here to Go"	Enormous Savages	Cultural Amnesia	wrote lyrics
2007 November	"Hot in the House", "Scars for E (alternate take 2)", "Spoilt Children"	Press My Hungry Button	Cultural Amnesia	wrote lyrics, album cover features sleeve notes by Balance dating from 1983
2007 November	"Scars for E (alternate take 1)"	Still Hungry	Cultural Amnesia	wrote lyrics
2009 May	"Fetish for Today", "Scars for E", "Here to Go"	Enormous Savages Enlarged	Cultural Amnesia	wrote lyrics
2016 June	"Hot in the House"	Ring The Hungry Bell	Cultural Amnesia	wrote lyrics, official video for "Hot in the House" features mailart and other images by Balance
