= Coil discography =

- Studio albums: 18
- Extended plays: 7
- Live albums: 9
- Compilation albums: 10
- Singles: 10
- Music videos: 5

Discography for the experimental music group Coil and their aliases.

== Albums attributed solely to Coil ==
- Scatology (LP/cassette/CD) (1985)
- Horse Rotorvator (LP/cassette/CD) (1986)
- Gold Is the Metal (With the Broadest Shoulders) (LP/CD) (1987)
- Love's Secret Domain (LP/cassette/CD) (1991 July)
- Stolen & Contaminated Songs (CD) (1992)
- Time Machines (1998)
- Astral Disaster (LP/CD) (1999 January/2000 January)
- Musick to Play in the Dark Vol. 1 (CD/LP) (1999 September)
- Queens of the Circulating Library (CD) (2000 April)
- Musick to Play in the Dark Vol. 2 (CD/2×LP) (2000 September)
- Constant Shallowness Leads to Evil (CD) (2000 September)
- The Remote Viewer (CD-R/2×CD) (2002 April)
- ANS (CD) (2003 May)
- Black Antlers (CD-R/2×CD) (2004 May)
- The Ape of Naples (CD/3×LP) (2 December 2005)
- The New Backwards (CD/LP) (2008)

== Extended plays ==
- How to Destroy Angels (12″) (1984)
- The Unreleased Themes for Hellraiser (10″/cassette/CD) (1987)

The Solstice and Equinox series

- Spring Equinox: Moon's Milk or Under an Unquiet Skull (7″/CD) (1998 March)
- Summer Solstice: Bee Stings (7″/CD) (1998 June)
- Autumn Equinox: Amethyst Deceivers (7″/CD) (1998 September)
- Winter Solstice: North (7″/CD) (1999 January)

== Singles ==
- "Panic/Tainted Love" (12″/CD) (1985)
- "The Anal Staircase" (12″) (1986)
- "The Wheel / The Wheal" (7″) (1987)
- "The Wheal / Keelhauler" (7″) (1987)
- "Wrong Eye/Scope" (7″) (1990)
- "Windowpane" (12″/CD) (1990)
- "The Snow" (12″/cassette/CD) (1991)
- "Airborne Bells/Is Suicide a Solution?" (7″) (1993 November)
- "Themes for Derek Jarman's Blue" (7″) (1993)
- "Animal Are You?" (box set) (2006 December)

== Live albums ==
- Coil Presents Time Machines (CD) (2000 September)
- Live Four (CD) (2003 March)
- Live Three (CD) (2003 March)
- Live Two (CD) (2003 May)
- Live One (2×CD) (2003 June)
- Megalithomania! (CD-R) (2003 July)
- Selvaggina, Go Back into the Woods (CD-R) (2004 July)
- ...And the Ambulance Died in His Arms (CD) (2005 April)

== Compilation albums ==
- Unnatural History (CD) (1990)
- Unnatural History II (CD) (1995 January)
- Windowpane & the Snow (CD) (1995)
- Unnatural History III (CD) (1997 June)
- A Guide for Beginners: The Voice of Silver (CD) (2001 September)
- A Guide for Finishers: Golden Hair (CD) (2001 September)
- Moon's Milk (In Four Phases) (2×CD) (2002 January)
- The Golden Hare with a Voice of Silver (2×CD) (2002)
- The Key to Joy Is Disobedience (box set) (2003 July)
- The Art & Audio, Works & Writings of Geoffrey Rushton Alias John Balance: The Years 1979-1986 (Early work of Balance, early work of Coil, 8xLP box set, book) (2024 June)

== Aliases and side-project releases ==
- Zos Kia / Coil – Transparent (cassette/CD/LP) (1984)
- Vortex Campaign / Coil / The New Blockaders – Dolbied (cassette) (1984)
- Sickness of Snakes – Nightmare Culture (12″) (1985)
- Coil vs The Eskaton – Nasa-Arab (12″) (1994)
- Coil vs ELpH – Born Again Pagans (CD) (1994)
- ELpH – pHILM #1 (10″) (1994)
- ELpH vs. Coil – Worship the Glitch (CD/2×10″) (1995)
- Black Light District – A Thousand Lights in a Darkened Room (CD/2×LP) (1996)
- Time Machines – Time Machines (CD/2×LP/2×CD) (1998/2001/2007)
- ELpH – elph.zwölf (CD) (1999)

== Other releases ==
- How to Destroy Angels (Remixes and Re-Recordings) (CD) (1992)
- The Angelic Conversation (CD) (1994)
- Songs of the Week (download series) (1998–99)
- The Remote Viewer (CD-R/2×CD) (2002 May)
- Spoiler Talks DVD Series: Coil (DVD) (2003)
- Moons Milk (In Four Phases) Bonus Disc (CD-R) (2003 July)
- Colour Sound Oblivion (16×DVD) (2010)

=== New material released after the death of Peter Christopherson ===
- Uncoiled, remixes of Nine Inch Nails (digital) (2012 November 4)
- Recoiled, remixes of Nine Inch Nails (CD/LP) (2014 February 24)
- Expansión Naranja (12″) (2015 June)
- The Angelic Conversation (Instrumental) (CD) (2015 October 9)
- Panic (CD) (2015 October 9)
- The Wheel (CD) (2015 October 9)
- The Anal Staircase (CD) (2015 October 9)
- The Consequences of Raising Hell (CD) (2015 October 9)
- Wrong Eye (CD) (2015 October 9)
- Windowpane (CD) (2015 October 9)
- The Snow (CD) (2015 October 9)
- Backwards (CD/LP) (2015 October 29)
- A Cold Cell in Bangkok (12″) (2017 August)
- Another Brown World / Baby Food (12″) (2017 September)
- Astral Disaster Sessions Un/Finished Musics (CD/LP) (2018 February 7)
- How to Destroy Angels, live and rehearsal (CD/LP) (2018 August 3)
- Live Five – Gdańsk Autumn 2002 (CD-R) (2019 April 19)
- Airborne Bells (CD) (2019 May 15)
- The Sound of Musick (CD) (2019 May 15)
- First Dark Ride (CD) (2019 May 15)
- Protection (CD) (2019 May 15)
- Heartworms (CD) (2019 May 15)
- I Don't Want to Be the One (CD) (2019 May 15)
- Copal (CD) (2019 May 15)
- The Restitution of Decayed Intelligence (CD) (2019 May 15)
- Swanyard (3×LP/2×CD) (2019 May 25)
- The Gay Man's Guide to Safer Sex + 2 (CD/LP) (2019 June 28)
- Live – Copenhagen 2002 (digital) (2019 July 28)
- A Prison of Measured Time (CD/12″) (2020 February)
- Astral Disaster Sessions Un/finished Musics Vol. 2 (LP) (2020 July 25)
- Sara Dale's Sensual Massage (CD/2×LP/digital) (2020 September 23)
- Live – Limoges 2002 (digital) (2022 July 31)
- Live – Lódz 2002 (digital) (2022 October 19)
- Persistence Is All: Live at Royal Festival Hall (CD) (2022 11 13)

== Compilation appearances ==
| Year | Compilation title | Song title | Alias | Track length | Format | Also appears on |
|---|---|---|---|---|---|---|
| 1979 | Standard Response | "Blue Funk (Scar for E)" | Murderwerkers | | cassette | track is exclusive to compilation |
| 1980 | Deleted Funtime | "Thin Veil of Blood" | Stabmental | 3:03 | cassette | track is exclusive to compilation |
| 1983 | The Beast 666 | "Here to Here (Double Headed Secret)" | Coil | 4:22 | CD | Unnatural History, Transparent |
| 1983 | The Elephant Table Album | "S Is for Sleep" | Coil | 3:31 | CD, 2×LP | Unnatural History |
| 1984 | Bethel | "Red Weather" | Coil | | cassette | Unnatural History II |
| 1984 | Life at the Top | "Homage to Sewage" | Coil | 2:13 | LP | Unnatural History |
| 1985 | Devastate to Liberate | "Restless Day" | Coil | 4:24 | cassette, LP | Scatology (CD pressing) |
| 1985 | The Fight Is On | "Sicktone" | Coil | 3:21 | LP | Unnatural History |
| 1985 | If You Can't Please Yourself, You Can't Please Your Soul | "The Wheel" | Coil | 2:41 | CD, LP | The Wheel |
| 1985 | U.K. Buzz#006 | "The Wheel" | Coil | 2:42 | LP | The Wheel |
| 1985 | A Diamond Hidden in the Mouth of a Corpse | "Neither His Nor Yours" | Coil | 2:48 | CD, LP | Unnatural History III |
| 1986 | Peyrere | "Dream Photography" | Coil | 3:24 | cassette | Unnatural History |
| 1986 | Ohrensausen | "His Body Was a Playground for the Nazi Elite" | Coil | 3:22 | LP | Unnatural History |
| 1987 | Raw Like Sewage | "Comfortable" | Coil | | | Unnatural History |
| 1987 | Less Than Angels | "Never" | Coil | | cassette | Unnatural History, The Angelic Conversation |
| 1988 | Core: A Conspiracy International Project | "Feeder" | CTI with Coil | 8:43 | CD, LP | Unnatural History III |
| 1989 | Myths 4: Sinople Twilight in Catal Hüyük | "Another Brown World" | Coil | 12:09 | CD, LP | Unnatural History II |
| 1989 | Pathological Compilation | "Contains a Disclaimer" | Coil | 7:34 | CD, LP, cassette | Unnatural History II |
| 1990 | Total Volume 1 | "The Anal Staircase (Relentless mix)" | Coil | 4:00 | CD | track is exclusive to compilation |
| 1991 | The Portable Altamont | "Wrong Eye" | Coil | 5:59 | CD | Wrong Eye, Unnatural History III |
| 1991 | The Portable Altamont | "Scope" | Coil | 6:36 | CD | Wrong Eye, Unnatural History III |
| 1991 | The Portable Altamont | "Meaning What Exactly?" | Coil | 3:45 | CD | Unnatural History III |
| 1991 | Wax Trax! Sampler#2 | "Love's Secret Domain (demo version)" | Coil | | cassette | Stolen & Contaminated Songs |
| 1991 | Order to the Galaxy Vol. 1 | "The Snow (Driftmix)" | Coil | 2:35 | CD, cassette | The Snow |
| 1993 | Electrocity Vol. 3 | "Windowpane" | Coil | 5:43 | CD | Love's Secret Domain |
| 1993 | Cash Cow: The Best of Giorno Poetry Systems 1965–1993 | "Neither His Nor Yours" | Coil | 2:48 | CD | Unnatural History III |
| 1994 | Chaos in Expansion | "Baby Food" | Coil | 12:03 | CD | Unnatural History III |
| 1994 | Black Box – Wax Trax! Records: The First 13 Years | "Love's Secret Domain" | Coil | 3:54 | 3×CD | Love's Secret Domain |
| 1994 | Black Box – Wax Trax! Records: The First 13 Years | "The Snow (Answers Come in Dreams II)" | Coil | 5:56 | 3×CD | The Snow |
| 1994 | Space Daze | "Nasa Arab" | Coil | 11:00 | 2×CD | Stolen & Contaminated Songs |
| 1994 | Out There: A Thread in Time | "Nasa Arab" | Coil vs The Eskaton | 10:59 | 2×CD, 4×LP | Stolen & Contaminated Songs |
| 1994 | El Mondo Ambiente | "The Snow (Driftmix)" | Coil | 2:35 | 2×CD | The Snow |
| 1995 | Macro Dub Infection | "The Hills Are Alive" | Coil | 7:16 | 2×CD, 3×LP | Unnatural History II |
| 1996 | Succour | "Lost Rivers of London" | Coil | 7:38 | 2×CD | Unnatural History III |
| 1996 | Treat the Gods as If They Exist | "It If Wasn't Wolves, What Was It?" | ELpH vs. Coil | 2:58 | CD | Protection (2019) |
| 1997 | Terra Serpentes | "Heartworms" | Coil | 7:14 | 2×CD | alternate version on Foxtrot |
| 1997 | Narcosis | "Stoned Circular II" | Black Light District | 6:41 | 2×CD | A Thousand Lights in a Darkened Room |
| 1998 | Foxtrot | "Blue Rats (Blue Cheese mix)" | Coil | 4:08 | CD, 2×10″ | Heartworms (2019) |
| 1998 | Foxtrot | "Heartworms" | Coil | 7:16 | CD, 2×10″ | Heartworms (2019); alternate version on Terra Serpentes |
| 1998 | Interiors | "Gnomic Verses" | ELpH | 5:05 | CD | I Don't Want to Be the One (2019) |
| 1999 | Industrial Strength Music | "Panic" | Coil | 4:19 | CD | Scatology |
| 1999 | The Torture Garden | "Blue Rats" | Black Light District | 3:11 | CD | A Thousand Lights in a Darkened Room |
| 2000 | Cornucopea | "Time Machines (excerpt)" | Coil | 5:20 | CD | partial version of track found on Time Machines |
| 2000 | The Wire Tapper 6 | "A Cold Cell" | Coil | 6:24 | 2×CD | alternate version found on A Guide for Beginners: The Voice of Silver |
| 2000 | Emre (Dark Matter) | "Broken Aura" | Coil | 8:05 | CD | I Don't Want to Be the One (2019) |
| 2000 | Computer Music Journal Sound Anthology Volume 24 | "Glisten #2" | Coil | 1:05 | CD | I Don't Want to Be the One (2019) |
| 2001 | Rough Trade Shops: 25 Years | "Further Back and Faster" | Coil | 7:58 | 4×CD | Love's Secret Domain |
| 2001 | ''sR:Ample'' | "Broken Aura (excerpt)" | Coil | 3:41 | CD | partial version of track found on Emre (Dark Matter) |
| 2001 | Lichttaufe 2 | "Are You Shivering?" | Coil | 9:38 | CD | Musick to Play in the Dark Vol. 1 |
| 2002 | Light + Kraft | "Love's Secret Domain" | Coil | | | Love's Secret Domain |
| 2002 | Rough Trade Shops: Electronic 01 | "Ended" | ELpH vs. Coil | 1:13 | 2×CD | Worship the Glitch |
| 2002 | Brain NOT in the Wire | "Mayhem Accelerator Part 1" | Coil | 12:17 | CD | partial version of a track found on Airborne Bells (2019) |
| 2002 | Beta-Beat 01 | "The Restitution of Decayed Intelligence II (excerpt)" | Coil | | 2×CD-R | partial version of a track found on The Restitution of Decayed Intelligence |
| 2002 | X-Rated: The Electronic Files | "Remote Viewing 1 (excerpt)" | Coil | 12:02 | 2×CD | partial version of a track found on The Remote Viewer |
| 2002 | The Wire 20: 1982-2002 | "Wrong Eye" | Coil | 5:54 | 3×CD | Wrong Eye, Unnatural History III |
| 2003 | Mutek 03 | "The Test" | Coil | 5:40 | CD | Backwards (2015) |
| 2003 | England's Hidden Reverse | "Are You Shivering?" | Coil | 9:37 | CD | Musick to Play in the Dark Vol. 1 |
| 2003 | England's Hidden Reverse | "Chaostrophy" | Coil | 5:39 | CD | Love's Secret Domain |
| 2003 | England's Hidden Reverse | "Amethyst Deceivers" | Coil | 6:33 | CD | Autumn Equinox: Amethyst Deceivers |
| 2003 | England's Hidden Reverse | "The Lost Rivers of London" | Black Light District | 7:41 | CD | A Thousand Lights in a Darkened Room |
| 2003 | Lactamase Bonus Compilation | "Bad Message" | Coil | 2:09 | 10″ | The Restitution of Decayed Intelligence (2019) |
| 2003 | The Lactamase 10″ Sampler | "The Restitution of Decayed Intelligence II (extract)" | Coil | 5:01 | CD-R | partial version of track found on The Restitution of Decayed Intelligence |
| 2005 | X-Rated: The Dark Files | "Coppice Meat" | Coil | 10:47 | CD | Moons Milk (In Four Phases) Bonus Disc |
| 2005 | OperettAmorale | "A List of Wishes" | Coil | 7:37 | CD, 2×LP | The Restitution of Decayed Intelligence (2019) |
| 2006 | Not Alone | "Broccoli" (live 25 July 2004) | Coil | 6:54 | 5×CD | The Restitution of Decayed Intelligence (2019) |
| 2006 | Brainwaves | "Journey to Avebury" | Coil | 13:13 | 3×CD | The Sound of Musick (2019) |
| 2006 November | Brainwaves | "Stoned Circular III" | Black Light District | 5:29 | 3×CD | Heartworms (2019) |
| 2008 October | Sleepwalk: A Selection by Optimo (Espacio) | "A Cold Cell in Bangkok" | Coil | 4:12 | CD | A Cold Cell in Bangkok |
| 2010 October | Why Be Blake When You Can Be Bleak? | "Manifesto" | Coil | 4:20 | 3×CD-R | exclusive, originally broadcast on Dutch national radio |

== Mixes, remixes & production by Coil ==
| Year | Title | Released on | Original artist | Length | Format |
|---|---|---|---|---|---|
| 1992 | "Gave Up" | Fixed | Nine Inch Nails | 5:25 | CD |
| 1994 | "Closer (Precursor)" | Closer to God | Nine Inch Nails | 7:16 | CD, 12″, cassette |
| 1994 | "Olive" | Switchblade | Schaft | 5:03 | CD |
| 1994 | "Visual Cortex" | Switchblade | Schaft | 8:01 | CD |
| 1995 | "Dreamspace (Coil - "Shadow vs Executioner" mix)" | Ellipsis | Scorn | 11:30 | CD, 5×12″ |
| 1995 | "Dreamscape (Unstable Sidereal Oneiroscopic mix)" | Ellipsis | Scorn | 4:45 | 5×12″ |
| 1995 | "The Downward Spiral (The Bottom)" | Further Down the Spiral | Nine Inch Nails | 7:28 | CD |
| 1995 | "Eraser (Denial; Realization)" | Further Down the Spiral | Nine Inch Nails | 6:33 | CD |
| 1995 | "Eraser (Polite)" | Further Down the Spiral (US version only) | Nine Inch Nails | 1:15 | CD |
| 1995 | "Erased, Over, Out" | Further Down the Spiral (US version only) | Nine Inch Nails | 6:00 | CD |
| 1995 | "Cowboys in Bangkok (Coil vs ELpH mix)" | Twist | Chris & Cosey | 5:53 | CD |
| 1996 | "Kraak (Coil mix)" | Kraak Remixes | Psychick Warriors ov Gaia | 10:05 | CD, 2×12″ |
| 1996 | "Kraak (Coil mix)" | History of Psychick Phenomenon | Psychick Warriors ov Gaia | 10:05 | 2×CD |
| 1996 | "Tactile vs Coil" | Outside the Circles of Time | Tactile | 5:29 | 12″ |
| 1996 | "Intervention 1 - Tactile vs Coil" | Recurrence & Intervention | Tactile | 5:32 | CD |
| 1997 | "Kála" | City of Light | Bill Laswell | 13:06 | CD |
| 1998 | "Villa Esplendor (Coil - Troglodyte mix)" | En-Co-D-Esplendor | Esplendor Geométrico | 9:01 | CD |
| 1999 | "Dreamscape (Unstable Sidereal Oneiroscopic mix)" | Anamnesis - Rarities 1994–1997 | Scorn | 5:08 | CD |
| 1999 | "The Gimp/Sometimes" | Hate People Like Us | People Like Us | 6:25 | CD, 2×CD |
| 2001 | "Fallen Angels Entering Pandemonium (Coil remix)" | So Soon | Slag Boom Van Loon | 9:42 | CD |
| 2001 | "Hobgoblins (Coil remix)" | The Séance at Hobs Lane | Mount Vernon Arts Lab | 5:48 | CD |
| 2004 | "I Wanna Be Your Dog (Coil Mogadog mix)" | I Wanna Be Your Dog | Futon | 6:18 | CD |
| 2004 | "Rush (Black Sun mix)" | Remixes 81–04 Rare Tracks | Depeche Mode | 5:57 | MP3 |
| 2004 | "Closer (Precursor)" | The Downward Spiral (Deluxe Edition) | Nine Inch Nails | 7:16 | CD |
| 2004 | "The Downward Spiral (The Bottom)" | The Downward Spiral (Deluxe Edition) | Nine Inch Nails | 7:32 | CD |
| 2004 | "Hobgoblins (Coil remix)" | The Electronic Bible Chapter 1 | Mount Vernon Arts Lab | 5:48 | CD |

== Remixes of Coil by others ==
- The album Pontifex Maximus by Phallus Dei includes a track called "Rule Again". The music for this track is credited to Coil and lyrics to Death in June, however it is merely the song "Here to Here" with the lyrics of the Death in June song "Rule Again" sung over top of the track. This track was neither authorized by Coil or Death in June. (1991)
- The album Pure by The Golden Palominos features a song called "No Skin" which samples "Nasa Arab" heavily. (1994)
- The album No Thought, No Breath, No Eyes, No Heart (Pure Mixes) by The Golden Palominos includes several versions of the song "No Skin" which heavily features "Nasa Arab". One of these tracks was included as part of the Songs of the Week series. (1995)
- The single Obsidian Monarch by Thread is a two track 7″ vinyl with a remix of "Glowworm/Waveform" and "Dark River". (1999)
- The album Москве by CoH features a remix of the ELpH vs. Coil track "pHILM". (2002)

== Music videos ==
| Song title | Album song is on | Music video released on | Directed by | Year |
|---|---|---|---|---|
| "The Wheel" | If You Can't Please Yourself, You Can't Please Your Soul | n/a | Peter Christopherson | 1985 |
| "Tainted Love" | Panic/Tainted Love, Scatology (CD version) | Black Box (A Video Retrospect) Volume 2 (VHS) | Peter Christopherson | 1985 |
| "Windowpane" | Love's Secret Domain | Black Box (A Video Retrospect) Volume 1 (VHS) | Peter Christopherson | 1990 |
| "The Snow (Answers Come in Dreams II)" | The Snow | n/a | Peter Christopherson | 1991 |
| "Love's Secret Domain" | Love's Secret Domain | n/a | Peter Christopherson | 1991 |
| "Ostia (The Death of Pasolini)" | Horse Rotorvator | Salò, or the 120 Days of Sodom (DVD) | Peter Christopherson | 2008 |
