= The Golden Hare with a Voice of Silver =

Compilation album by Coil
- Released: October 2002
- Length: 2:13:28
- Label: Eskaton
- Producer: Coil

Coil chronology
The Remote Viewer (2002)	The Golden Hare with a Voice of Silver (2002)	Live Four (2003)

Professional ratings
Review scores
Source	Rating
AllMusic	4.5/5 stars
Encyclopedia of Popular Music	3/5 stars

The Golden Hare with a Voice of Silver is a double compilation album by British experimental music group Coil, released in October 2002 by their vanity label Eskaton and distributed via World Serpent Distribution. It compiles two Russian compilation albums released by Feelee Records in 2001, A Guide for Beginners: The Voice of Silver and A Guide for Finishers: Golden Hair, with the former being disc one and the latter being disc two, respectively.

The catalogue number for this release is Eskaton 29.

== Track listing ==
The Golden Hare with a Voice of Silver — disc one
No.	Title	Original recording	Length
1.	"Amethyst Deceivers"	Autumn Equinox: Amethyst Deceivers	6:33
2.	"Lost Rivers of London"	Unnatural History III	7:41
3.	"Are You Shivering?"	Musick to Play in the Dark Vol. 1	9:38
4.	"Ostia (The Death of Pasolini)"	Horse Rotorvator	6:21
5.	"Where Are You?"	Musick to Play in the Dark Vol. 2	7:51
6.	"At the Heart of It All"	Scatology	5:12
7.	"A Cold Cell"	The Wire Tapper 6	5:58
8.	"Batwings (A Limnal Hymn)"	Musick to Play in the Dark Vol. 2	11:09
9.	"Who'll Fall?"	Stolen & Contaminated Songs	5:15
10.	"The Dreamer Is Still Asleep"	Musick to Play in the Dark Vol. 1	9:41

The Golden Hare with a Voice of Silver — disc two
No.	Title	Original recording	Length
1.	"Panic"	Scatology	4:18
2.	"First Dark Ride"	Nasa Arab	10:50
3.	"Further Back and Faster"	Love's Secret Domain	7:55
4.	"The Anal Staircase"	Horse Rotorvator	3:57
5.	"Red Skeletons"	A Thousand Lights in a Darkened Room	7:32
6.	"Scope"	"Wrong Eye/Scope"	6:35
7.	"Solar Lodge"	Scatology	5:36
8.	"Blue Rats"	A Thousand Lights in a Darkened Room	3:08
9.	"A.Y.O.R."	Backwards demo	3:11
10.	"The First Five Minutes After Violent Death"	Gold Is the Metal (With the Broadest Shoulders)	4:59
