= A Guide for Finishers: Golden Hair =

Compilation album by Coil
- Released: September 2001
- Genres: Experimental; Dark ambient
- Length: 58:05
- Label: Feelee FL 3183-2
- Producer: Coil

Coil chronology
A Guide for Beginners: The Voice of Silver (2001)	A Guide for Finishers: Golden Hair (2001)	Moons Milk (In Four Phases) (2001)

A Guide for Finishers: Golden Hair (Russian: «Пособие для кончающих: Волос Злата», Posobie dlya konchayushchikh: Volos Zlata) was the second of two CD compilations released to mark Coil's first performance in Russia. It is a collection of their industrial music style works. The titles were devised by the Russian musician and Coil collaborator Ivan Pavlov.

== Release history ==
The album was released in an edition of 1,000 copies. This compilation, as well as its twin Пособие для начинающих: Глас Се́ребра, were later released as the double CD The Golden Hare with a Voice of Silver.

== Track listing ==
1. "Panic" – 4:18
2. "First Dark Ride" – 10:50
3. "Further Back and Faster" – 7:55
4. "The Anal Staircase" – 3:57
5. "Red Skeletons" – 7:32
6. "Scope" – 6:35
7. "Solar Lodge" – 5:36
8. "Blue Rats" – 3:08
9. "A.Y.O.R." – 3:11
10. "The First Five Minutes After Death" – 4:59

== Song origins ==
- "Panic" and "Solar Lodge" were originally released on Scatology.
- "First Dark Ride" was originally released on the 12" "Nasa Arab" as Coil vs. The Eskaton. The song was later released on Unnatural History III.
- "Further Back And Faster" was originally released on Love's Secret Domain.
- "Red Skeletons" and "Blue Rats" were originally released on A Thousand Lights in a Darkened Room as Black Light District.
- "Scope" was originally released on "Wrong Eye/Scope" and later released on Unnatural History III.
- "A.Y.O.R." was previously available in a slightly longer form on the bootleg Backwards. The song was later remade as "It's in My Blood" and released on The Ape of Naples.
- "The First Five Minutes After Death" is incorrectly labeled "The First Five Minutes After Violent Death". "The First Five Minutes After Death" originally appeared on Horse Rotorvator - as did "The Anal Staircase" - and has a track timing of 4:45, while "The First Five Minutes After Violent Death" originally appeared on Gold Is the Metal (With the Broadest Shoulders) with a track timing of 2:43 due to a sequencing error, although the remastered/revised version is 5:00.
