= The Unreleased Themes for Hellraiser =

- Cover of the vinyl & CD releases

EP by Coil
- Released: 1987
- Genre: Experimental
- Labels: Solar Lodge, Soleilmoon, Torso
- Producer: Coil

Coil chronology
The Wheal/Keelhauler (1987)	The Unreleased Themes for Hellraiser (1987)	Wrong Eye/Scope (1990)

Professional ratings
Review scores
Source	Rating
Allmusic	3/5 stars
Encyclopedia of Popular Music	3/5 stars

The Unreleased Themes for Hellraiser (subtitled The Consequences of Raising Hell...) is an EP by Coil, which was released in 1987. It was the proposed soundtrack to the film Hellraiser, but was turned down because it was not considered commercial enough. The EP was released on 10" vinyl in 1987 and subsequently re-released on cassette and CD in 1988 and 1990 respectively.

== Background ==
=== Initial releases ===
The EP's 1987 10" vinyl release with catalog number COIL 1 is one of very few releases on the record label Solar Lodge Records (another being Crime's "San Francisco's Doomed" CD, a collaboration with Overground records). The cassette version was licensed to Soleilmoon and released in 1988, with catalog number SOL 4.

Side A of the 10"/cassette releases contained three songs from the recording sessions for Coil's rejected Hellraiser soundtrack. Side B of these versions is labeled "Music for Commercials" and contained audio jingles for advertisements, which had nothing to do with the Hellraiser soundtrack.

In 1990 Solar Lodge Records released a CD of the EP in collaboration with Torso Records with the catalog number TORSO CD161. The CD version features three previously unreleased tracks from the soundtrack recording sessions, does however not include the "Music for Commercials."

The artworks for all releases was created by Trevor Brown. The cover sleeve of the vinyl is printed with the back side flipped upside down, so that either side could be seen as the front cover, since the disk would be removed at the right edge of the sleeve when viewing either side upright. One side features an illustrated ambiguous image of a praying angel, which can be interpreted as a human skull. The other side has a similarly painted texture as a background for text, which includes the title, band name, a quote from Clive Barker, and publication information. The cassette features a different cover than the CD and vinyl releases, showing a variation of the praying angel image, without the double-meaning of the vinyl version. The CD release used the same cover image as the textless side of the 10" vinyl.

The 10" vinyl is titled "The Unreleased Themes for Hellraiser" on its cover, while the sicker on the front of the cassette version simply reads "...Hellraiser". Both versions feature "The Consequences of Raising Hell..." printed on their spine. The 1990 CD version is titled "Hellraiser Themes" and subtitled "The Unreleased Themes for Hellraiser" on its back cover.

=== Compilation appearances ===
Coil's 1987 album Gold is the Metal (With the Broadest Shoulders), a compilation of outtakes and demos from the Scatology, Horse Rotorvator, and Hellraiser recording sessions, included the track "Cardinal Points". The song was an outtake written with Bill McGee from the Horse Rotorvator recording sessions, which the band planned to adopt into their Hellraiser soundtrack before the project was abandoned.

All six tracks from the CD version appeared on the Unnatural History II compilation in 1995, some of which with differing titles. In addition, the compilation also included three more previously unreleased tracks from the Hellraiser soundtrack sessions, "In Memory of The Truth", "Unquiet Rest" and "Wait, Then Return". B-side tracks from the 10"/cassette version appeared as a single track titled "Music for Commercials" on Unnatural History III in 1997.

=== Expanded re-issues ===
In 2015 Threshold Archives released an extended CD version with the catalog number T-ARCH 008CD. It was listed as "The Consequences of Raising Hell...", though its packaging did not bear any text such as artist, title, or a tracklist at all. This CD is ostensibly a re-release of the 10" vinyl and cassette versions, including the commercial music from their B-sides, which had been omitted from the 1990 Solar Lodge CD. In addition to the three tracks from the original releases' A-sides, this CD expands the tracklist by including the six Hellraiser session tracks, that had been released by then on the 1990 CD and Unnatural History II, using the track listing and song titles as seen on the latter. At the end of the tracklist this release adds five untitled tracks.

Arrow Video released a Blu-ray Box Set of the first three Hellraiser films in October 2015, which includes an interview with Coil member Stephen Thrower as a bonus feature titled "Soundtrack Hell: The Story of the Abandoned Coil Score", in which Thrower talks about the history of the band's relationship to Clive Barker, their involvement with Hellraiser, and how they were ultimately let go from the project.

A full-length album composed entirely of recordings from the Hellraiser sessions was released digitally in February 2026 by the label Musique Pour La Danse, titled "The Unreleased Themes For Hellraiser [Expanded Ritual]" with liner notes by Danny Hyde. The track listing has a completely different order compared to the previous versions. The Expanded Ritual Edition includes the six tracks which were on the 1990 CD and six new previously unheard tracks. The song "Cardinal Points", which was first released on Gold is the Metal (With the Broadest Shoulders) was also included, appearing alongside the other Hellraiser session tracks for the first time, despite itself being recorded during the Horse Rotorvator sessions. This release does not include the Music for Commercials and notably "In Memory of The Truth", "Unquiet Rest" and "Wait, Then Return", three tracks from the Hellraiser Sessions, that were first released on Unnatural History II.

== Track listing ==
=== 1987 Solar Lodge 10" vinyl and 1988 Soleilmoon cassette ===
All music is composed by Coil.

Side A: "The Unreleased Themes for Hellraiser"
No.	Title	Length
1.	"Hellraiser"	2:46
2.	"Box Theme"	3:01
3.	"Main Title"	3:14

Side B: "Music for Commercials"
No.	Title	Writer(s)	Length
4.	"Airline 1"	with Bill McGee	0:41
5.	"Liqueur"		0:43
7.	"Perfume"		0:31
8.	"Video Recorder"	with Andrew Poppy	0:30
9.	"Airline 2"		0:46
10.	"Natural Gas"		0:46
11.	"Cosmetic 1"		0:17
12.	"Cosmetic 2"		0:15
13.	"Analgesic"		1:13
14.	"Road Surface"		1:23
15.	"Accident Insurance"		1:35
Total length:			17:34

=== 1990 Torso CD ===
All music is composed by Coil.

No.	Title	Prior Release	Length
1.	"Hellraiser Theme"	initially titled "Hellraiser".	2:49
2.	"The Hellbound Heart"	previously unreleased.	2:21
3.	"Box Theme"		3:04
4.	"No New World"	previously unreleased.	3:53
5.	"Attack of the Sennapods"	previously unreleased.	1:54
6.	"Main Title"		3:13
Total length:			17:21

=== 2015 Threshold Archive CD ===
All music is composed by Coil.

No.	Title	Writer(s)	Prior Release	Length
1.	"The Hellraiser Theme"		initially titled "Hellraiser".	2:50
2.	"In Memory of the Truth"		previously released on "Unnatural History II".	2:59
3.	"Unquiet Rest"		previously released on "Unnatural History II".	2:06
4.	"Wait, Then Return"		previously released on "Unnatural History II".	2:13
5.	"The Hellbound Heart"			2:23
6.	"The Box Theme"		initially titled "Box Theme".	3:06
7.	"No New World"			3:58
8.	"Vanishing Point"		initially titled "Attack of the Sennapods".	1:55
9.	"The Main Title"		initially titled "Main Title".	3:21
10.	"Airline 1"	with Bill McGee		0:41
11.	"Liqueur"			0:45
12.	"Perfume"			0:32
13.	"Video Recorder"	with Andrew Poppy		0:29
14.	"Airline 2"			0:46
15.	"Natural Gas"			0:49
16.	"Cosmetic 1"			0:16
17.	"Cosmetic 2"			0:15
18.	"Analgesic"			1:13
19.	"Road Surface"			1:22
20.	"Accident Insurance"			1:38
21.	"Untitled"			3:04
22.	"Untitled"			3:51
23.	"Untitled"			2:15
24.	"Untitled"			4:50
25.	"Untitled"			7:51
Total length:				55:32

=== 2026 Expanded Ritual Edition ===
All music is composed by Coil.

No.	Title	Writer(s)	Prior Release	Length
1.	"Attack of the Sennapods"			1:53
2.	"The Box Theme (Mix 2)"		previously unreleased.	5:30
3.	"Main Title"			3:23
4.	"Zither Theme"		previously unreleased.	1:04
5.	"Hellbound Heart (Mix 1)"		initially titled "The Hellbound Heart".	2:20
6.	"No New World"			3:53
7.	"The Box Theme (Mix 1)"		initially titled "Box Theme".	3:02
8.	"Arcade sounds"		previously unreleased.	3:56
9.	"Cardinal Points"	with Bill McGee	previously released on "Gold is the Metal (With the Broadest Shoulders)".	4:19
10.	"Atmospheric Stuff"		previously unreleased.	2:51
11.	"Hellraiser Theme (Mix 2)"		initially titled "Hellraiser".	2:46
12.	"Flutey Theme"		previously unreleased.	1:08
13.	"Unearthly Hell"		previously unreleased.	7:14
Total length:				43:27

== Personnel ==
All releases credit all music to be composed by Coil. Who exactly contributed to the recordings is unclear. Full time members of the band only included John Balance and Peter Christopherson at the time, but Stephen Thrower, a common collaborator and future full time band member, is confirmed to have also been involved with the recording sessions.

Though credited to the entire band, Thrower has stated that the advertisement music was solely written by Christopherson with some external collaborators. "Airline 1" is credited to be written with Bill McGee, who also arranged "Cardinal Points" for the Horse Rotorvator recording sessions. Andrew Poppy is credited to have co-written "Video Recorder".

=== 1987 10" vinyl ===
- All music composed by – Coil
  - "Airline 1" written with – Bill McGee
  - "Video Recorder" written with – Andrew Poppy
- All artwork by – Trevor Brown
- Label – Solar Lodge Records
- Published by – Threshold House
- Lacquer cut by – Jack Adams
- Pressed by – MPO

=== 1988 Cassette ===
- All music composed by – Coil
  - "Airline 1" written with – Bill McGee
  - "Video Recorder" written with – Andrew Poppy
- All artwork by – Trevor Brown
- Label – Soleilmoon Recordings
- Licensed from – Solar Lodge Records
- Published by – Threshold House

=== 1990 CD ===
- All music composed by – Coil
- Art by – Trevor Brown (as Graphic Autopsy)
- Design – Famiglia Sandro
- Label – Torso, Solar Lodge Records
- Marketed – Torso Records
- Distributed by – EFA
- Published by – Threshold House
- Made by – PDO

=== Expanded Ritual Edition ===
- A&R – Oliver Ducret
- Artwork by – Trevor Brown
- Composed by – Coil
  - "Cardinal Points" written with – Bill McGee (uncredited)
- Label – Musique Pour La Danse
- Layout – Raguar Canes
- Liner Notes – Danny Hyde
- Mastered by – Clive Jean XV
- Mastered at – CS Labyrynth Studio
- Distributed by – Wordandsound
- Licensed from – Danny Hyde
