= Unnatural History (album) =

Compilation album by Coil
- Released: 1990
- Recorded: 1983–1986
- Genre: Experimental
- Length: 57:09
- Label: Threshold House
- Producer: Coil

Coil chronology
Wrong Eye/Scope (1990)	Unnatural History (1990)	Windowpane (1990)

Professional ratings
Review scores
Source	Rating
AllMusic	4/5 stars
Encyclopedia of Popular Music	3/5 stars

Unnatural History (subtitled Compilation Tracks Compiled) is a compilation album produced by Coil, including tracks that originally appeared on various compilations and limited edition releases along with some previously unreleased material. The compilation contains material from 1983 to 1986, but was only released in 1990. It would become the first in a series of compilation albums with the releases of Unnatural History II and Unnatural History III.

== Song origins ==
- "Various Hands", "The Swelling of Leeches", and "The Pope Held Upside Down" were originally released on the 12" Nightmare Culture, a split collaboration between Coil (incl. Boyd Rice) and Current 93.
- "His Body Was A Playground For The Nazi Elite" was originally released on the compilation Ohrensausen.
- "Homage To Sewage" was originally released on the compilation "Life At The Top".
- "Here To Here (Double Headed Secret)" was originally released on the compilation The Beast 666.
- "S Is For Sleep" was originally released on the compilation "The Elephant Table Album".
- "Dream Photography" was originally released on the compilation Peyrere.
- "Comfortable" was originally released on the compilation Raw Like Sewage.
- "Never" was later released, in an extended form, on The Angelic Conversation. The song originally appeared on the compilation Less Than Angels.
- In the liner notes, "Penetralia II" is listed as being taken from a limited 7" on the Shock label. However the reference is actually to the Wrong Eye/Scope single, so "Penetralia II" is otherwise unreleased.
- "Sicktone" was originally released on the compilation The Fight Is On.
- "How to Destroy Angels" is from the 12" How to Destroy Angels, except it is presented in mono whereas the original was in stereo.

== Additional information ==
Of the thirteen tracks on the album only "S is for Sleep" (described by Balance as a song about illness) and "Penetralia II" (an alternate mix to a Horse Rotorvator piece) have prominent vocals; "Homage to Sewage", however, uses a heavily manipulated sample of Pier Paolo Pasolini's Salò o le 120 giornate di Sodoma.

The earliest pressings of this release are reported to suffer from bronzing.

== Track listing ==
No.	Title	Length
1.	"Various Hands"	3:26
2.	"The Swelling of Leeches"	3:05
3.	"The Pope Held Upside Down"	3:41
4.	"His Body Was a Playground for the Nazi Elite"	3:29
5.	"Homage to Sewage"	2:23
6.	"Here to Here (Double Headed Secret)"	4:51
7.	"S is for Sleep"	3:26
8.	"Dream Photography"	3:23
9.	"Comfortable"	1:41
10.	"Never"	4:37
11.	"Penetralia II"	3:10
12.	"Sicktone"	3:23
13.	"How to Destroy Angels"	16:41
Total length:		57:16

== Personnel ==
- John Balance
- Peter Christopherson
- Stephen Thrower (track 10)
- Boyd Rice (tracks 1–4)
