= A Guide for Beginners: The Voice of Silver =

Compilation album by Coil
- Released: September 2001
- Genres: Experimental; Dark ambient
- Length: 1:15:22
- Label: Feelee
- Producer: Coil

Coil chronology
Constant Shallowness Leads to Evil (2000)	A Guide for Beginners: The Voice of Silver (2001)	A Guide for Finishers: Golden Hair (2001)

A Guide for Beginners: The Voice of Silver (Russian: «Пособие для начинающих: Глас Се́ребра», Posobie dlya nachinayuschih: Glas Sérebra) was one of two CD compilations released to mark Coil's first performance in Russia. It is a collection of their ambient music style works. The titles were devised by the Russian musician and Coil collaborator Ivan Pavlov.

== Release history ==
The album was released an edition of 1,000 copies. This compilation, as well as its twin Пособие для кончающих: Волос Злата, were later released as the double CD The Golden Hare With A Voice Of Silver. The catalogue number for this release is FL 3182-2.

== Track listing ==
1. "Amethyst Deceivers" – 6:33
2. "The Lost Rivers of London" – 7:41
3. "Are You Shivering?" – 9:38
4. "Ostia (The Death of Pasolini)" – 6:21
5. Where Are You?" – 7:51
6. "At the Heart of It All" – 5:12
7. "A Cold Cell" – 5:58
8. "Batwings (A Limnal Hymn)" – 11:09
9. "Who'll Fall?" – 5:15
10. "The Dreamer Is Still Asleep" – 9:41

== Song origins ==
- "Amethyst Deceivers" was originally released on the EP Autumn Equinox: Amethyst Deceivers.
- "The Lost Rivers of London" was previously released on Unnatural History III as "Lost Rivers of London". The song was originally released on the compilation Succour – Terrascope Benefit Album. In 1996, the song was remade and released as "London's Lost Rivers" on the Black Light District album A Thousand Lights in a Darkened Room.
- "Are You Shivering?" was originally released on Musick to Play in the Dark Vol. 1.
- "Ostia (The Death of Pasolini)" was originally released on Horse Rotorvator.
- "Where Are You?" was originally released on Musick to Play in the Dark Vol. 2.
- "At the Heart of It All" was originally released on Scatology.
- This version of "A Cold Cell" is exclusive to this compilation. A similar version was released on the compilation The Wire Tapper 6 with a track timing of 6:24. The song was later reworked and released as "Cold Cell" on The Ape of Naples.
- "Batwings (A Limnal Hymn)" is also an exclusive version, although a very similar version appears on Musick to Play in the Dark Vol. 2. The difference between the two is that the MTPID2 version is 11:32 long with music, while the shorter version that appears on this compilation has an opening of a sound resembling a truck driving on a road.
- "Who'll Fall?" was originally released on Stolen & Contaminated Songs.
- "The Dreamer Is Still Asleep" originally appeared on Musick to Play in the Dark Vol. 1.
