= Live Four =

Live album by Coil
- Released: 2003 March
- Genre: Experimental
- Length: 1:19:43
- Label: Threshold House LOCI CD21
- Producer: Coil

Coil chronology
The Golden Hare with a Voice of Silver (2002)	Live Four (2003)	Live Three (2003)

Professional ratings
Review scores
Source	Rating
AllMusic	4.5/5 stars

Live Four is a live compilation by English band Coil. This CD was the first of four releases in a series. Its counterparts are Live Three, Live Two and Live One. This album was later released as part of Coil's box set The Key to Joy Is Disobedience.

== Background ==
The performance dates for "Bang Bang" and "An Unearthly Red" were performed in Prague on 27 October 2002. "I Am Angie Bowie (Sine Waves)", "Last Rites of Spring", "Are You Shivering", "Amethyst Deceivers", "The Universe is a Haunted House", "Ostia" and "I Don't Want To Be The One" are from a performance that took place on 29 October 2002 at Flex in Vienna, Austria.

"I Am Angie Bowie (Sine Waves)", "The Universe is a Haunted House", "Bang Bang" and "An Unearthly Red" are songs that have never had a proper studio release. "Last Rites of Spring" was originally released in studio form as "The Last Rites of Spring" on the album Gold Is the Metal (With the Broadest Shoulders). "Are You Shivering?" was originally released in studio form on the album Musick to Play in the Dark Vol. 1. "Amethyst Deceivers" was originally released on the CD/7" single Autumn Equinox. The version of the song on this album is a slower and much more like "The Last Amethyst Deceiver" on The Ape of Naples than the original version. "A Warning from the Sun" was originally released in studio form as "A Warning from the Sun (For Fritz)" on the CD single "Summer Solstice". "Ostia" was originally released in studio form on "Ostia (The Death of Pasolini)" on the album Horse Rotorvator. The version of the song on this album is much slower than the original. "I Don't Want To Be The One" was originally released in studio form as Astral Disaster. "Bang Bang" is a cover of an old song by Sonny Bono. The lyrics to "An Unearthly Red" allude to a statement made by George W. Bush saying, "God told me to end the tyranny in Iraq". The song was released on a CD by Danny Hyde as "An Unhealthy Red".

On the back on the CD, there is notice of an upcoming DVD and vinyl release of the compilation. The vinyl edition was never released, but videos of both shows (the same songs as on the CD, with the exception of "Last Rites of Spring", which is unique to the CD) are included in the Colour Sound Oblivion 16DVD set.

According to the liner notes: "Coil were: Jhon Balance, Peter Christopherson, Ossian Brown & Thighpaulsandra.

== Track listing ==
1. "I Am Angie Bowie (Sine Waves)" – 6:10
2. "Last Rites of Spring" – 10:42
3. "Are You Shivering?" – 8:20
4. "Amethyst Deceivers" – 8:24
5. "A Warning From The Sun" – 6:19
6. "The Universe is a Haunted House" – 11:15
7. "Ostia" – 8:13
8. "I Don't Want To Be The One" – 5:10
9. "Bang Bang" – 2:44
10. "An Unearthly Red" – 12:23
