= Cyclobe =

British electronic music duo

- Origin: London, England
- Genre: Experimental
- Years active: 1999–present
- Label: Phantomcode
- Members: Stephen Thrower; Ossian Brown
- Website: Cyclobe

Cyclobe (1999–present) are a music duo formed by Stephen Thrower and Ossian Brown. They make hallucinatory electronic soundscapes by mixing sampled and heavily synthesized sounds with acoustic arrangements for a variety of instruments including hurdy-gurdy, border pipes, duduk and clarinet. Their approach draws upon diverse forms, including acousmatic, drone music, sound collage, folk and progressive rock.

== Background ==
Thrower and Brown met in the early 1990s through their mutual association with Coil. Thrower joined Coil for their first album in 1984, he left in 1993 (having worked on the albums Scatology, Horse Rotorvator and Love's Secret Domain) and went on to form the experimental trio Identical, with Gavin Mitchell and Orlando. All three members of Identical worked as The Amal Gamal Ensemble, alongside other musicians including David Knight and Karl Blake of Shock Headed Peters. Thrower is also a film journalist and author of "Beyond Terror: The Films of Lucio Fulci" and "Nightmare USA". He appeared in several films by Derek Jarman including The Last of England and Imagining October, as well as co-writing the soundtrack to The Angelic Conversation. Ossian Brown worked with Coil from 1999 until the band's cessation following the death of John Balance in 2004. Appearing on several albums, and performing live both as Time Machines and Coil at The Royal Festival Hall, The Barbican in London and numerous venues throughout Europe. He is also the author of "Haunted Air", a book featuring anonymous Halloween photographs from c.1875–1955.

== Music ==
The first Cyclobe album, Luminous Darkness (1999), veered between hard-edged electronic music, Musique concrète, Industrial, and acoustic interludes for piano, strings and woodwind. They were joined on several tracks by Calina De La Mare (violin) and Niall Webb (bass clarinet). Next came The Visitors (2001), again featuring De La Mare (violin), alongside Sarah Willson (cello) and Coil's Thighpaulsandra (production). Although still assaultive at times, The Visitors developed a warmer, expansive sound, with lush atmospherics and harmonic complexity. A third album followed in the form of a collaboration with Nurse With Wound, called Paraparaparallelogrammatica (2004). Cyclobe took their 'remix' of a 40-minute Nurse With Wound composition to the extreme, mostly obliterating the original. With contributions from David Tibet of Current 93, and Coil members/collaborators Thighpaulsandra and Cliff Stapleton, the result was complex electroacoustic psychedelia, completely individual but very much in sympathy with Nurse With Wound's methods.

Ossian Brown played on the Current 93 album "Aleph at Hallucinatory Mountain" (2009). Stephen Thrower recorded "The Temporal Bends", a CD that was released in collaboration with David Knight under the name UnicaZürn, featuring a rare performance from the artist and musician Danielle Dax.

In 2010 Cyclobe released the full-length album "Wounded Galaxies Tap at The Window" on Phantomcode records. On this album Ossian Brown and Stephen Thrower worked with guest musicians Thighpaulsandra, Cliff Stapleton, Michael J York and John Contreras. The albums centre piece being the 17 minute epic "The Woods are Alive with The Smell of His Coming", a track that was premiered at the Tate Gallery in St Ives. at the exhibition "The Dark Monarch – Magic and Modernity in Modern Art". The front cover artwork to "Wounded Galaxies" was created by the American artist Fred Tomaselli and the insert artwork by the artist Alex Rose. Alex Rose went on to create the front cover artwork for Cyclobe's "The Eclipser/The Moths of Pre-Sleep" single which was also released that same year on Dot Dot Dot Music.

Ossian Brown's first book "Haunted Air" was published in 2010 by Jonathan Cape, with an introduction by David Lynch and an afterword by Geoff Cox.

In 2012 Cyclobe released "Sulphur-Tarot-Garden", soundtracks to three films by the film maker and artist Derek Jarman. This release was a limited edition CD to celebrate their debut live appearance in London at the Queen Elizabeth Hall, which also saw the premiere of these three films with Cyclobe's soundtrack.

== Live ==
Cyclobe's first live performance was held in Krems, Austria in April 2007 at the Donau Festival, curated by David Tibet from Current 93. Cyclobe's line up for this show was Ossian Brown, Stephen Thrower, Cliff Stapleton and Thighpaulsandra.

On 4 August 2012 they made their second appearance performing at Londons Queen Elizabeth Hall as a part of the Meltdown Festival, curated by Anohni of Antony and The Johnsons. Their evening "Albion-Hynagogue-Ghost; Hallucinatory Queer British Paganism" also had performances from David Tibet and James Blackshaw's Myrninerest as well as screenings of rare super 8 films by Derek Jarman of which Cyclobe premiered soundtracks to three of his films, Sulphur, Tarot and Garden of Luxor. Cyclobe's line up for this concert was Ossian Brown, Stephen Thrower, Michael J York, Cliff Stapleton, Ivan Pavlov, Dave Smith and Antony Hegarty . Incorporating films and projected artworks by Fred Tomaselli, Anna Thew, Alex Rose and David Larcher.

Cyclobe made their third live performance in Norway on 7 September 2012 invited by Brian Eno, the artistic director of the 2012 Kristiansand Punkt festival.

== Discography ==
=== Albums ===
- Luminous Darkness (CD) (1999)
- The Visitors (CD) (2001)
- Paraparaparallelogrammatica (CD, vinyl) (2004)
- Wounded Galaxies Tap at the Window (vinyl, download) (2010)
- Wounded Galaxies Tap at the Window (CD) (2011)
- Sulphur-Tarot-Garden (CD, vinyl) (2014)
- The Visitors (CD, vinyl) (2014)

=== Singles ===
- Pathfinder/Remember, Archangels Protect Us... (vinyl) (2003)
- Each and Every Word Must Die II (CD) (2004)
- The Eclipser/The Moths of Pre-Sleep (vinyl) (2010)
- Augural Sun (CD) (2010)
- Ayin Acla (CD) (2011)

=== Compilation tracks ===
Song title	Released on	Date released	Format	Length
"I Believe in Mirrorballs"	Hate People Like Us	1999	CD, 2XCD	
"Silent Key"	Emre (Dark Matter)	2000	CD	
"Replaced By His Constellation"	Brain in the Wire	2002	3XCD	
"Frostflowers for Mikkel Gaup"	Electrically Induced Vibrations	2002		
"Indulge Yourselves With Our Delicious Monsters"	Not Alone	2006	CD Box set	
