= Unnatural History II =

Compilation album by Coil
- Released: January 1995
- Genre: Experimental
- Length: 1:05:45
- Label: Threshold House LOCI CD 10
- Producer: Coil

Coil chronology
The Angelic Conversation (1994)	Unnatural History II (1995)	Windowpane & The Snow (1995)

Professional ratings
Review scores
Source	Rating
AllMusic	3/5 stars

Unnatural History II (subtitled Smiling in the Face of Perversity) is the second in the Unnatural History series of compilation albums by Coil. Unlike the compilations Stolen & Contaminated Songs and Gold Is the Metal with the Broadest Shoulders, the Unnatural History albums collect songs from more than one era of Coil's work.

== Compilation origins ==
- "Red Weather" originally appeared on the compilation cassette Bethel.
- "Theme from Blue I" and "Theme from Blue II" originally appeared on Themes for Derek Jarman's Blue.
- "Airborne Bells" is from the Airborne Bells/Is Suicide a Solution? single.
- "Another Brown World" is from the 12"/CD compilation Myths 4 – Sinople Twilight in Catal Hüyük.
- "Contains a Disclaimer" is from the compilation Pathological Compilation.
- "The Hellraiser Theme" was released on The Unreleased Themes for Hellraiser as "Hellraiser".
- "The Hellbound Heart" and "No New World" were released on the CD version of The Unreleased Themes for Hellraiser. "The Box Theme" was also released on The Unreleased Themes for Hellraiser, as "Box Theme".
- "In Memory of The Truth", "Unquiet Rest" and "Wait, Then Return" were previously unreleased material from The Unreleased Themes for Hellraiser session.
- "Vanishing Point" was released on the CD version of The Unreleased Themes for Hellraiser as "Attack of the Sennapods".
- "The Main Title" was released as "Main Title" on all versions of The Unreleased Themes for Hellraiser.
- "The Hills Are Alive" was originally released on the compilation Macro Dub Infection Vol. 1.

== Other information ==
Track 15 contains the songs "Themes from Blue II" and "The Hills Are Alive". The two tracks are separated by silence from 2:18 to 3:46. "The Hills Are Alive" is not listed on the track listing on the back insert or CD booklet.

The album was originally shipped with a postcard.

This album was available via download at Coil's official website Thresholdhouse.com in aac, mp3, and lossless flac formats.

== Track listing ==
No.	Title	Length
1.	"Red Weather"	4:12
2.	"Theme from Blue I"	2:21
3.	"Airborne Bells"	5:21
4.	"Another Brown World"	11:41
5.	"Contains a Disclaimer"	7:34
6.	"The Hellraiser Theme"	2:47
7.	"In Memory of the Truth"	2:57
8.	"Unquiet Rest"	2:04
9.	"Wait, Then Return"	2:11
10.	"The Hellbound Heart"	2:21
11.	"The Box Theme"	3:04
12.	"No New World"	3:56
13.	"Vanishing Point"	1:53
14.	"The Main Title"	3:19
15.	"Theme from Blue II" (Contains the hidden track "The Hills Are Alive" from 3:47)	11:04
Total length:		1:05:45

== Personnel ==
=== Writing, Performance ===
- John Balance
- Peter Christopherson (tracks 2–16)
- Drew McDowall (track 2, 15)
- Stephen Thrower (tracks 3–14)

=== Artwork ===
- Peter Smith
