= Ossian Brown =

- Born: 3 April 1969 (age 56) London, England
- Occupation: Musician

Ossian Brown (born 3 April 1969) is an English musician and artist, most notable for being a member of the groups Coil and Cyclobe.

He joined Coil in 1999 and remained with them until the band's cessation following the death of singer John Balance in 2004. He worked on several albums and performed live with the group at The Royal Festival Hall, The Barbican in London, and numerous venues throughout Europe.

Brown formed Cyclobe in 1996 with his partner Stephen Thrower (also a one-time member of Coil). They released their first album Luminous Darkness in 1999, named after a series of paintings by their friend, the filmmaker Derek Jarman. Cyclobe went on to release a number of albums, most notably Wounded Galaxies Tap at The Window (2010). The group seldom perform live: their first and only concert in the United Kingdom was held at the Queen Elizabeth Hall, London in 2012, at the invitation of singer and artist Anohni, who performed with them for this occasion. They went on to play the CTM Festival in Berlin, Poland's Unsound Festival, and the Punkt Festival in Norway, the latter curated by Brian Eno.

Brown's first book Haunted Air was published in 2010 by Jonathan Cape, with an introduction by David Lynch and an afterword by Geoff Cox.

In 2015, Brown contributed to the album Who Is the Sender? by singer songwriter Bill Fay, appearing on the opening track "The Geese Are Flying Westward".

In 2016, he played hurdy-gurdy for the English folk singer Shirley Collins on her album Lodestar, released by Domino Records. The album, Collins' first since For as Many as Will (1978), was recorded and pre-produced by Brown and Stephen Thrower in the singer's cottage in Lewes, East Sussex. Among his contributions, Brown composed an original piece for the album, "The Split Ash Tree". In 2017 he performed a series of UK concerts with Shirley Collins as a member of her group.

In collaboration with fellow Cyclobe member Michael J York, Brown contributed a soundtrack to the documentary film The Ballad of Shirley Collins (2017), directed by Rob Curry and Tim Plester. He also appeared in the film, working with Collins in her East Sussex cottage, as well as performing Awake Awake and The Split Ash Tree with Collins and Ian Kearey on the South Downs.

In 2018, Brown contributed to the Current 93 album The Light Is Leaving Us All, performing the album in its entirety with the group at London's Shepherd's Bush Empire on 13 October. Following this he made live appearances with the group in Bern and Berlin.

On 31 January 2019, Brown performed with Shirley Collins at her Roundhouse concert in London.

In February 2020, working with the group These New Puritans, Brown contributed a track called "Into The Trees" to their album The Cut, the piece being a ‘recomposition’ of Where The Trees Are on Fire from the TNP album Inside the Rose (2019).

In July 2020, the album Heart's Ease by Shirley Collins was released on Domino Records. Brown worked on two pieces, playing hurdy-gurdy on the traditional song Barbara Allen and a new composition, Crowlink, created in collaboration with guest artist Matthew Shaw.

== Selected discography ==
=== with Coil ===
- Queens Of The Circulating Library (2000)
- Coil Presents Time Machines (2000)
- Constant Shallowness Leads To Evil (2000)
- The Remote Viewer (2002)
- ANS (2003)
- Live One (2003)
- Live Three (2003)
- Live Four (2003)
- The Restitution Of Decayed Intelligence (2003)
- Megalithomania! (2003)
- The Key To Joy Is Disobedience (2004)
- ANS (2004)
- The Ape Of Naples (2005)
- Colour Sound Oblivion (2010)

=== with Cyclobe ===
- Luminous Darkness (1999)
- The Visitors (2001)
- Pathfinder/Remember Archangels Protect Us... (2003)
- Each and Every Word Must Die (2004)
- Angry Eelectric Finger 2: Paraparaparallelogrammatica (2004) (Collaboration with Nurse With Wound)
- The Eclipser/The Moths of Pre-Sleep (2010)
- Wounded Galaxies Tap at the Window (2010)
- Augural Sun (2010)
- Ayin Acla (2011)
- Sulphur-Tarot-Garden (2014)

=== with Current 93 ===
- Aleph at Hallucinatory Mountain (2009)
- I Am the Last of All the Field That Fell: A Channel (2014)
- The Light Is Leaving Us All (2018)

=== with Bill Fay ===
- Who Is the Sender? (2015)

=== with Shirley Collins ===
- Lodestar (2016)
- Heart's Ease (2020)

=== with These New Puritans ===
- The Cut (2020)

== See also ==
- John Balance
- Coil
- Current 93 and David Tibet
- Shirley Collins
- Bill Fay
- Halloween traditions
