= Songs of the Week =

- Cover art for the bootleg recording titled Black Gold (Collected Rarities)

Recording by Coil
- Released: 1998
- Recorded: 1998–1999
- Genre: Experimental, dark ambient
- Length: 2:26:53
- Producer: Coil

Songs of the Week are a collection of songs by Coil distributed via their former primary website Brainwashed.com.

== Background ==
Starting in October 1998, a "Song of the week" was made available for download. This feature ended sometime in August 1999. The series consisted of 26 tracks in mp3 format, each at a bit rate of 128kbs, except for track 10, which has a bitrate of 160kbs. The compilation is notable for being released with the band's permission and containing many exclusive song versions and tracks. Vinyl exclusive songs from this set were sourced from vinyl.

"The Dark Age of Love" features Marc Almond on vocals.

This series of releases is commonly known as Black Gold in its 2XCD bootleg version.

== Track listing ==
1. "The Spoiler (LP Version)" – 3:03
  - Released on vinyl pressings of Scatology, but not the subsequent CD or digital releases.
2. "The Wheel (Vocal)" – 2:44
  - Released on compilation If You Can't Please Yourself, You Can't Please Your Soul.
3. "The Anal Staircase (Dionysian Remix)" – 5:56
  - Released on The Anal Staircase.
4. "The Anal Staircase (Relentless Mix)" – 3:59
  - Released on compilation Total Volume One.
5. "Keelhauler" – 3:41
  - Released on The Wheal/Keelhauler.
6. "Is Suicide a Solution" – 5:21
  - Released on Airborne Bells/Is Suicide a Solution?.
7. "pHILM #1 (vox)" – 9:17
  - Released on pHILM #1 by ELpH.
8. "Static Electrician" – 3:10
  - Released on pHILM #1.
9. "Red Scratch" – 3:08
  - Released on pHILM #1.
10. "Nasa Arab (No Skin (Aural Circumcision))" – 9:11
  - Released on The Golden Palominos EP No Thought, No Breath, No Eyes, No Heart : The Pure Remix EP.
11. "If It Wasn't Wolves, Then What Was It" – 2:58
  - Released on compilation Treat the Gods As If They Exist.
12. "Gnomic Verses" – 5:04
  - Released on compilation Interiors; recorded as ELpH.
13. "Blue (Special Alternate Combination Mix)" – 1:59
  - Exclusive version.
14. "Theme from The Gay Man's Guide to Safer Sex" – 8:13
  - Exclusive.
15. "Bee Has The Photos" – 4:55
  - From Backwards demo.
16. "Egyptian Basses" – 8:16
  - From Backwards demo.
17. "Pre-Original Chaostrophy" – 5:33
  - Exclusive.
18. "The Dark Age of Love" – 3:25
  - Exclusive.
19. "Spastiche" – 5:57
  - From Backwards demo.
20. "Assassins of Hakim Bey" – 4:15
  - Exclusive featuring Bill Laswell and Hakim Bey.
21. "Protection II" – 13:24
  - Exclusive, original released on Born Again Pagans.
22. "Rush (Black Sun remix)" – 5:57
  - A remix of Depeche Mode; later released on Remixes 81 – 04.
23. "Stoned Circular III" – 5:22
  - Released on Brainwaves.
24. "Journey to Avebury" – 10:59
  - Released on Brainwaves with longer intro.
25. "Acid Jam (Part 3)" – 2:42
  - Exclusive.
26. "Acid Jam (Part 2)" – 8:38
  - Exclusive.
