= Live in Moscow =

Live in Moscow may refer to:

- Live in Moscow (Coil video), 2001
- Live in Moscow (Red Elvises DVD), 2006
- Live in Moscow (album), a 2007 live album by Stone Sour
