= Panic/Tainted Love =

"Panic / Tainted Love"

Single by Coil

from the album Scatology
- A-side: "Aqua Regis"; "Panic"
- B-side: "Tainted Love"
- Released: 1985
- Genre: Industrial
- Label: Some Bizzare
- Producers: Coil; JG Thirlwell

Coil singles chronology
"Panic / Tainted Love" (1985)	"The Anal Staircase" (1987)

Music video
- "Tainted Love" on YouTube

Professional ratings
Review scores
Source	Rating
AllMusic	2.5/5 stars

"Panic" and "Tainted Love" are songs recorded by British experimental music band Coil. These were released in 1985 through Some Bizzare in the UK and Wax Trax! Records in the US respectively, as the band's first single, (Note: Some sources referred to it as a single, while others call it an extended play.) and the sole one from their 1984 debut studio album, Scatology. Originally released on twelve-inch vinyl discs, the single was regarded as the first AIDS benefit release, and has been reissued several times on compact discs.

"Panic", co-written and co-produced by the band with JG Thirlwell, is the second track on Scatology, and explores the theme of an initiatory approach to experience, as well as the using of fear; its remixed version is featured on the single's A-side. (Note: Depending on what considered the A-side, different sources refer to the release as either "Panic" or "Tainted Love".) "Tainted Love", originally written by Ed Cobb and popularly known after its recording by new wave duo Soft Cell, was included as the B-side, having been drastically re-arranged to reflect HIV/AIDS epidemic, emerged in the early 1980s. The music video for "Tainted Love", directed by the band's member Peter Christopherson and featuring Marc Almond, has caused a minor controversy during its release, and has been purchased by the Museum of Modern Art.

== Themes and composition ==
=== "Panic" ===
"Panic" was written by John Balance, Peter Christopherson, and J. G. Thirlwell. It is four minutes and twenty-one seconds long, and is the second track on both vinyl and compact disc versions of Scatology. Musically, the song contains use of guitar feedback, rhythmic drum machine parts and Balance's "feral" vocal styling. The song ends with a vocal outro chanting, "The only thing to fear is fear itself". (Note: In the liner notes of Unnatural History III Balance admitted that "these days" (in times of the aforementioned compilation release), he was "scared of everything", commenting the last line of the song (Coil 1997, "Panic (12" Version)").)

The liner notes of Scatology feature an extended commentary on the song, allegedly written by John Balance. According to Balance, "Panic" is intended to be "about the deliberate nurture of states of mind usually regarded as dangerous and insane," and is also about "using a fear as a key [...] to crystallize and inspire." Balance also writes about a so-called "murder in reverse" that means "performing [...] psychic surgery - in order to restore the whole being." Liner notes for the single feature the similar text, and so does A Coil Magazine which was published in 1987. A Coil Magazine editors John Sanders and Mike Gaffney interpreted the song's lyrics as a hymn to Pan as an incarnate of liberating aspect of chaos. David Keenan gives a same statement, adding that the song deals with theme of initiatory approach to experience which was concurrent theme throughout later Coil's work.

The A-side of the single features a remixed version of the song, extended to last approximately seven and a half minutes. The remix features Marc Almond's band bassist Bill McGee playing on double bass, and is being preceded by "Aqua Regis", an instrumental track which was said to be "a restructured version" of "Panic". Dubbed "the Dionysian remix" in the liner notes of Unnatural History III, it was described as a "curious and somewhat clumsy consctruction" since it was edited on the digital 3/4-inch video system.

=== "Tainted Love" ===
A cover version of Ed Cobb's song "Tainted Love", which was originally recorded by American singer Gloria Jones and became popular after being recorded by British band Soft Cell, was included on the single's B-side. Referred to by the band as "desecratory but sensitive," it became widely viewed by commentators, as well as the band's members, as a reflection on then-emerged HIV/AIDS epidemic. In the 1992 interview, Christopherson said that "Tainted Love" was "one of the first records that was supposed to have a moral as well as an entertaining aspect".

An arrangement for Coil's version of "Tainted Love" was heavily changed in contrary to Soft Cell's version, slowed down to the point when it gives a terrifying impression. Beside from synthesizer and percussion parts, Balance sings in a capella approach, giving one of his "most harrowing vocal performances". Remembering Christopherson upon his death in 2010, Thirlwell said this approach to be to an improvisation which came about during the recording: feeling that Balance's vocals were too "deadpan", Thirlwell asked Christopherson to go into the vocal booth with Balance and wrench the latter's arm behind his back, and pull on it, "to put a bit of pain into the performance."

In the November 2005 issue of The Wire, Coil's version of "Tainted Love" was featured in the "Remake Remodel" list of renowned cover songs; in the entry, author Keith Moliné deemed it a superior version to the 2001 performance by Marilyn Manson. In 2017, "Tainted Love" was given an entry in the Treble webzine's "10 Creepy Cover Songs" list; the year later, it was ranked at number 99 in the same publication's "The Top 100 Cover Songs" list.

== Release ==
The "Panic/Tainted Love" single was initially released in April–May 1985, shortly after the release of Scatology, by Force & Form and K.422. In the United States, the single was licensed by Wax Trax! Records; it was reissued in 1990 on CD by Wax Trax!, and later in 1994 by TVT Records. An extended edition of single was issued in 2015 as part of the Threshold Archives series. The single's first pressing featured a textured sleeve, with the first 1000 copies also being produced on red vinyl; some copies included an A4 insert with an advert for the single and Scatology on one side, and a listing of other Some Bizzare releases on the other. The artwork for the single was designed by artist Eddie Cairns, who was said to be the band's friend, and later died from AIDS-related disease.

Profits from the single's sales were reportedly successful, and had been donated via the Terrence Higgins Trust for the AIDS research, as it was announced in the single's liner notes; since then, it is regarded as the first AIDS benefit music release. (Note: In a 1995 interview to German experimental music magazine Auf Abwegen, John Balance reported that Coil had been recognised by Wax Trax! as "the first band who made an AIDS benefit record, 'Tainted Love' in 1984." The band reiterated this point in liner notes of the 2001 CD reissue of Scatology, and so did a number of commentators since then.)

"Aqua Regis" and "Tainted Love" were included on compact disc versions of Scatology released in 1988 and 2001. The single version of "Panic" is in a 1997 compilation Unnatural History III, while the album version is featured on compilation albums A Guide for Finishers: Golden Hair and The Golden Hare with a Voice of Silver.

=== "Tainted Love" video ===
The music video for "Tainted Love" was directed by Peter Christopherson with an £8.000 advance, and was aired around same time the single was released. The video features Balance, portrayed as an AIDS victim in his last days, and Christopherson as a hospital orderly. At one point, Marc Almond appears as a leather-clad hospital visitor, viewed by some commentators as representing the angel of death.

In August 1985, the video was featured on an exhibition held by the Museum of Modern Art, and was later purchased into the latter collection, of which the band was said to be proud. In 1994, the video was featured on a Wax Trax! video compilation, Black Box: Retrospective, Vol. 2.

== Track listings ==
Original 12" release (1985)
No.	Title	Length
1.	"Aqua Regis"	2:27
2.	"Panic"	7:31
3.	"Tainted Love"	5:52
Total length:		15:50

CD release (1990) (re-released in 1994)
No.	Title	Length
1.	"Aqua Regis"	2:25
2.	"Panic"	7:38
3.	"Tainted Love"	5:52
Total length:		15:58

CD compilation reissue (2015)
No.	Title	Length
1.	"Aqua Regis"	2:28
2.	"Panic" (Extended Remix)	7:39
3.	"Tainted Love"	5:55
4.	"Restless Day"	4:48
5.	"Untitled"	0:27
6.	"Neither His Nor Yours"	2:53
7.	"Panic" (Alt Mix 1 - Cello)	4:11
8.	"Panic" (Alt Mix 2 - Guitar)	4:22
9.	"Tiny Birds"	3:46
10.	"Circles of Mania" (Early)	3:08
11.	"Untitled"	4:26
12.	"Ice"	5:40
13.	"Tainted Love" (Sleazy Vocal)	6:33
Total length:		56:16

== Personnel ==
All credits adapted from the liner notes of original release.

- John Balance — vocals (tracks 2 and 3), electric guitar (track 2), percussion (track 3), production
- Peter Christopherson — programming, sampler (track 2), keyboard (track 3), production
- JG Thirlwell (as Clint Ruin) — programming and sampler (track 2), production
- Bill McGee — double bass (track 2)
- Filth Spektor — strings arrangement (track 3; credited as "strings derangements")
- Warne Livesey — engineer
- Martyn Phillips — remixing engineer (track 2)

== Charts ==
Chart (1985)	Peak position
UK Indie Chart	5

== Release history ==
Region	Date	Label	Format	Catalog
United Kingdom	1985	Force & Form	LP	FFK 5.12
United States	1985	Wax Trax! Records	LP	WAX 013
United States	1990	Wax Trax! Records	CD	WAXCD 013
United States	1994	TVT Records	CD	TVT 7013
United States	2015	Threshold Archives	CD	T-ARCH 005CD
