= Moon's Milk (In Four Phases) Bonus Disc =

EP by Coil
- Released: January 2002
- Recorded: 21 December 2001
- Genre: Experimental
- Length: 40:23
- Label: Threshold House
- Producer: Coil

Coil chronology
Moons Milk (In Four Phases) (2002)	Moon's Milk (In Four Phases) Bonus Disc (2002)	The Remote Viewer (2002)

Coil EP chronology
Winter Solstice: North (1999)	Moon's Milk (In Four Phases) Bonus Disc (2002)	The Restitution of Decayed Intelligence (2003)

Moon's Milk (In Four Phases) Bonus Disc is a semi-official name for an edition of Coil CD-Rs released in conjunction with Moon's Milk (In Four Phases). It was released in January 2002.

== Release history ==
Each CD sleeve was hand painted and given its own unique title. Most of the sleeves were numbered, followed by the title, then "2001 ev.", "Winter Solstice - December 21, 2001 ev.", or something similar. Most of the titles have quotations around them. This official CD-R was originally available with a 'special edition' order of Moon's Milk (In Four Phases) which cost $85 more than the two cd set. Additional copies were made available later separately. The later ones were said to be the unnumbered ones that Jhonn Balance kept because he favored them. However, most of the later ones did not include a signed polaroid as the initial set did. The numbered edition is believed to be between 1 and three hundred, with repeating numbers. An approximate 33 of the 'Bonus Discs' comprise the unnumbered edition.

The song "The Coppice Meat" later appeared on a CD compilation titled X-Rated: The Dark Files.

This CD was going to be re-released on Moon's Milk In Six Phases, though this never materialized.

== Track listing ==
No.	Title	Writer(s)	Length
1.	"Copal"		16:54
2.	"The Coppice Meat"	Angus MacLise	10:49
3.	"Ü Pel (Incense Offering)"		13:40
Total length:			48:43

== Personnel ==
- John Balance
- Peter Christopherson
- William Breeze
