= Duplais Balance =

Box set by Coil
- Released: December 2006
- Genre: Experimental
- Length: 11:39
- Label: Absinthevertrieb Lion HOA237862
- Producer: Coil

Coil chronology
The Ape of Naples (2005)	Duplais Balance (2006)	The New Backwards (2008)

Additional artwork
- Bottle label

Duplais Balance is a box set by Coil, containing a CD with the track "Animal Are You?", a bottle of absinthe, two glasses and two spoons.

== Background ==
It was first available for preorder in November 2006 and offered for sale in "mid December". The box set was produced in a limited edition of 250.

According to the official merchant, the box set contains the following:

- 1 Absinthe Duplais Balance 0.5 L – 60% (label design by Peter Christopherson)
- 2 Absinthe glasses
- 2 Absinthe spoons
- 1 Coil CD "Animal Are You?"

== Track listing ==
1. "Animal Are You?" - 11:39
