= Not Alone (album) =

Compilation album by multiple artists
- Released: February 2006
- Label: Jnana

Not Alone is a compilation album of five CDs, released in February 2006. It was curated by Mark Logan, founder of Busted Flat records and David Tibet. Proceeds from the sale of Not Alone are donated to Médecins Sans Frontières, specifically towards their work on the AIDS epidemic in Africa. As of November 2014, the project has generated $35,500 CAD in donations to M.S.F.

== Track listing ==
=== CD 1 ===
1. irr.app.ext - "Fly Away and Then What?"
2. Damon and Naomi - "A Song For You"
3. John Contreras - "Brian"
4. Mirror - "Forgotten Language of Light"
5. Fursaxa - "In Lieu Of"
6. Baby Dee - "When You Found Me"
7. Howie B - "Yesterday I Was a Cow"
8. Tom Recchion - "Sea World"
9. Matmos - "A Song for the Appeal"
10. Blue Eyed Black - "Sweet Shadow Heart"
11. Eric Lanzilotta - "An Exploration of a Spacious Yet Enclosed Domain (excerpt)"
12. Little Annie - "Freddy And Me"
13. Colin Potter - "It's Coming"
14. Keiji Haino - "Fleeting Panic-Stricken Shriveled Equal Temperament"
15. Allen Ginsberg - "On Another's Sorrow"
16. Devendra Banhart - "A Sight to Behold"
17. Surkamp - "With Out Borders"

=== CD 2 ===
1. Jarboe - "Mantra"
2. L - "The First Flower People"
3. Richard Buckner - "Do You Want to Go Somewhere"
4. Cyclobe - "Indulge Yourselves With Our Delightful Monster"
5. Six Organs of Admittance - "You Will Be The Sun"
6. Dolly Collins - "Poor Sally Sits a Weeping"
7. William Basinski - "Because"
8. Edward Ka-Spel - "Sticks and Stones"
9. Larsen - "Il Sogno Di Momi"
10. Vashti Bunyan - "The Same But Different"
11. Angels of Light - "Song For My Father"
12. Thighpaulsandra - "Star Malloy"
13. Suishou no Fune - "In the Clouds"
14. Pantaleimon - "Change My World (Alternative Mix)"
15. Aube - "Movement"
16. Mr Durt - "Denial"
17. Michael Yonkers - "Somebody"

=== CD 3 ===
1. Bevis Frond - "Someone Always Talks"
2. Sarah Hallman - "Snowballin'"
3. Faun Fables - "The Transit Rider"
4. Luke Doucet - "Unbelievable"
5. Jad Fair - "Right on the Line"
6. Unveiled - "Endless"
7. Antony - "Hole In My Soul"
8. Charlemagne Palestine - "Espoir Geurison"
9. Alex Neilson & Richard Youngs - "House of Constant Song"
10. Anonoanon - "Hit the Road"
11. James William Hindle - "Back Home Again"
12. Isobel Campbell - "The Beat Goes On"
13. The Bricoleur - "Prah Pip Ta"
14. Sorrow - "Long Dark Shadow"
15. Teenage Fanclub - "I Need Direction (Alternative Version)
16. Mary 5E - "Therapy"
17. Sundial - "Crazy Horses"

=== CD 4 ===
1. Jeremy Reed - "Helioqabalus"
2. NQ Arbuckle - "Huntsville Affair"
3. Shannon Lyon - "No Thing"
4. The Hafler Trio - "The Work of Washing"
5. Marissa Nadler - "Judgement Day"
6. Max Richter - "Flower For Yulia"
7. Bill Fay - "It's the Small Things Now"
8. Bonnie 'Prince' Billy - "Song for Doctors Without Borders"
9. Lynn Jackson - "Waiting for the Sky to Fall"
10. Nurse With Wound - "Ubu Noir"
11. Clodagh Somonds - "The Glacial Lake"
12. Shirley Collins - "Come My Love"
13. 7 Year Rabbit Cycle - "Pirates"
14. John Terrill - "Stoney Mansion"
15. Brett Smiley - "Our Lady of the Barren Tree"
16. Linda Perhacs - "Parallelograms"
17. Current 93 - "Sunset"
18. Pearls Before Swine - "Our Lady"
19. Thurston Moore - "Sex Addiction"

=== CD 5 ===
1. Marc Almond - "Our Love My Madness"
2. Simon Finn - "Crow Flies"
3. Stephanie Volkmar - "The Gate of Polished Horn"
4. Small Creatures - "City of Dreams"
5. Thee Majesty - "Thee Seeding Ship"
6. Jim O'Rourke - "Naoru"
7. Scott Stapleton - "Shadow Makes a Snow Angel"
8. John Maslen - "Everything Was Handed Down"
9. Jooel - "Over the Sea"
10. Ghostigital - "Bump"
11. Amy Curl - "The Robin's Tiny Throat"
12. srmeixner - "Wild Spaces (excerpt)
13. Mount Vernon Arts Lab -
14. Coil - "Broccoli" (Taken from 2004 July 25 live performance.)
15. Shock Headed Peters - "Aaron's Rod"
16. Ghost - "Daggma"
