= The Snow (song) =

Single by Coil

from the album Love's Secret Domain
- Released: 1991
- Genre: Industrial, house
- Length: 35:23
- Label: Torso; Wax Trax!
- Producer(s): Coil and Danny Hyde

Coil singles chronology
"Windowpane" (1990)	"The Snow" (1991)	"Airborne Bells/Is Suicide a Solution?" (1993)

The Snow is a track by the British experimental music group Coil, available on the album Love's Secret Domain and also released as a 12" vinyl, cassette and CD EP.

== Background ==
A music video of "The Snow (Answers Come in Dreams II)" was directed by Peter Christopherson.

"The Snow (Driftmix)" and "The Snow (Out in the Cold)" are remixes by Peter Christopherson. "The Snow (Answers Come in Dreams I)" and "The Snow (Answers Come in Dreams II)" are remixes by Jack Dangers. "The Snow (As Pure As?)" was remixed by John Balance and Drew McDowall.

The EP was later combined with Windowpane and released as Windowpane & The Snow.

== EP track listing ==
=== 12" vinyl ===
Side A:

1. "The Snow (Driftmix) – 2:35
2. "The Snow (Answers Come in Dreams I)" – 5:47
3. "The Snow (Out in the Cold)" – 7:43

Side B:

1. "The Snow (As Pure As?)" – 6:33
2. "The Snow (Answers Come in Dreams II)" – 5:57
3. "The Snow" – 6:48

=== CD ===
1. "The Snow (Driftmix)" – 2:35
2. "The Snow (Answers Come in Dreams I)" – 5:47
3. "The Snow (Out in the Cold)" – 7:43
4. "The Snow (As Pure As?)" – 6:33
5. "The Snow (Answers Come in Dreams II)" – 5:57
6. "The Snow" – 6:48
