= Constant Shallowness Leads to Evil =

Studio album by Coil
- Released: September 12, 2000
- Genre: Experimental, noise
- Length: 61:44
- Label: Eskaton; Dais Records
- Producer: Coil

Coil chronology
Coil Presents Time Machines (2000)	Constant Shallowness Leads to Evil (2000)	A Guide for Beginners: The Voice of Silver (2001)

Coil album chronology
Musick to Play in the Dark Vol. 2 (2000)	Constant Shallowness Leads to Evil (2000)	The Remote Viewer (2002)

Alternative cover
- Cover for the 2022 remaster. The image represents the cover art for the digital release, with physical editions using a variation on this artwork.

Constant Shallowness Leads to Evil is a CD by Coil, released the same year as Queens of the Circulating Library. Like Queens, this album originally came packaged only in a pink c-shell case, with no official cover art except the on-disc printing.

According to the credits, "Coil were Thighpaulsandra, John Balance, & Peter Christopherson. Thanks to Simon Norris."

The track names provided are "Higher Beings Command", "I Am the Green Child", "Beige", "Lowest Common Abominator", "Free Base Chakra", and "Tunnel of Goats". The track listing is rather mysterious as it only lists six tracks while 23 tracks are actually pressed on the CD. The most commonly given explanation (including that of the official archive) is that the final song title, "Tunnel of Goats", is that of an 18-track suite which is, along with the trio of tracks before it, the main musical basis of the live opus "Constant Shallowness Leads to Evil". Release notes for the 2022 remaster state that this track layout was "intended to scramble the functionality of a CD player's shuffle mode[...]".

The release is unique in Coil's catalog for several things not unusual to the band separately: it is very noisy and nearly devoid of conventional instruments and vocals. John Balance's singing appears only on "I Am the Green Child" and minimally on "Tunnel of Goats", while Tom Edwards plays marimba on the former. However, their live act prominently featured Edwards's playing and, unlike the original, the live version of "Higher Beings Command" does include vocals.

The following warning appears after the track listing: "May Cause Drowsiness – Do Not Play While Driving or Operating Machinery".

The catalogue number is ESKATON 24. Coil Presents Time Machines has the similar catalog number of ESKATON CD24.

In 2022, Dais Records remastered and reissued the album as a 2-LP set (seven different pressings on different colours of vinyl, with some having lenticular covers), CD and Bandcamp download. The remaster was done by Josh Bonati, while official cover art was created by Nathaniel Young.

== Track listing ==
No.	Title	Length
1.	"Higher Beings Command"	4:10
2.	"I Am the Green Child"	13:45
3.	"Beige"	5:57
4.	"Lowest Common Abominator"	5:00
5.	"Free Base Chakra"	5:15
6.	"Tunnel of Goats"	5:00
7.	"Tunnel of Goats"	0:29
8.	"Tunnel of Goats"	0:22
9.	"Tunnel of Goats"	0:23
10.	"Tunnel of Goats"	2:00
11.	"Tunnel of Goats"	2:00
12.	"Tunnel of Goats"	2:00
13.	"Tunnel of Goats"	2:00
14.	"Tunnel of Goats"	2:00
15.	"Tunnel of Goats"	2:00
16.	"Tunnel of Goats"	2:00
17.	"Tunnel of Goats"	2:00
18.	"Tunnel of Goats"	2:00
19.	"Tunnel of Goats"	1:00
20.	"Tunnel of Goats"	1:00
21.	"Tunnel of Goats"	0:15
22.	"Tunnel of Goats"	0:21
23.	"Tunnel of Goats"	0:17
Total length:		1:01:14

=== Notes ===
- Tracks 3, 4 and 5 are mixed as a continuous piece, fading out at the end of track 5. Tracks 6 through 21 are continuous as well. Track 22 is silent, except for the beginning which is an extension from track 21. Track 23 features John Balance laughing with echo effects applied to his voice.
- Starting at 1:57 of track 10, through track 12, Balance can be heard singing in the right channel.
- The lyrics to "Tunnel of Goats" resurface on "Constant Shallowness Leads to Evil" on Live Two and the conclusion of "Backwards" on Live Three.
- On the Dais 2LP reissues, side A is tracks 1–2, B is 3–5 and "Tunnel of Goats" is split between sides C and D.
- On the Dais CD and digital reissues, the tracks entitled "Tunnel of Goats" are summed into track 6, with a run time of 27:38.
