= Musick to Play in the Dark =

Musick to Play in the Dark is a series of two albums by British experimental music group Coil:

- Musick to Play in the Dark Vol. 1, 1999
- Musick to Play in the Dark Vol. 2, 2000
