= Live Two =

Live album by Coil
- Released: May 2003
- Recorded: 15 September 2001
- Genre: Experimental
- Length: 54:43
- Label: Threshold House LOCI CD19
- Producer: Coil

Coil chronology
Live Three (2003)	Live Two (2003)	Live One (2003)

Professional ratings
Review scores
Source	Rating
AllMusic	3.5/5 stars

Live Two was a CD by Coil which documents their live performance on 15 September 2001 at DK Gorbunova in Moscow, Russia. This CD was one of four releases in a series. Its counterparts are Live Four, Live Three and Live One. This album was later released as part of Coil's box set The Key To Joy Is Disobedience.

== Background ==
"Something" was originally released in studio format on the album Musick To Play In The Dark Vol. 2. "Higher Beings Command" was originally released in studio form on Constant Shallowness Leads To Evil. "Amethyst Deceivers" was originally released on the single "Autumn Equinox". "What Kind Of Animal Are You?" has never been given a proper studio release, but was likely inspired by a track "For Us They Will" from Gold is the Metal. "Blood From The Air" was originally released in studio form on the album Horse Rotorvator. "The Green Child" originally appeared on the album Constant Shallowness Leads To Evil. The finale, "Constant Shallowness Leads to Evil", is musically based on the latter half of the album of the same name, with its lyrics derived from a portion of "Tunnel of Goats".

An official VHS of this concert was released as Live In Moscow. This (along with an alternate video angle version) is also included on the 'Colour Sound Oblivion' 16DVD box set.

For this recording, Coil were: Jhon Balance, Peter Christopherson, Thighpaulsandra and Tom Edwards.

This album is currently available in CD format at Coil's official website, Thresholdhouse.com.

== Track listing ==
1. "Something/Higher Beings Command" – 8:45
2. "Amethyst Deceivers" – 6:32
3. "What Kind Of Animal Are You?" – 8:53
4. "Blood From The Air" – 5:35
5. "The Green Child" – 7:56
6. "Constant Shallowness Leads To Evil" – 17:11
