= The Angelic Conversation (album) =

Soundtrack album by Coil
- Released: 1994
- Genre: Experimental, dark ambient
- Length: 1:10:00
- Label: Threshold House LOCI CD 06
- Producer: Coil

Coil chronology
Themes for Derek Jarman's Blue (1993)	The Angelic Conversation (1994)	Unnatural History II (1995)

Professional ratings
Review scores
Source	Rating
AllMusic	3/5 stars

The Angelic Conversation is a CD soundtrack released by Coil for the Derek Jarman film bearing the same name. This album was recorded by John Balance, Peter Christopherson, and Stephen Thrower. Judi Dench provides the vocals, which are recitations of Shakespeare's sonnets.

"Enochian Calling", "Angelic Stations" and a few other tracks use samples from Coil's debut EP, How to Destroy Angels. "Never" was previously released in a shorter form on Unnatural History.

== Track listing ==
1. "Ascension" – 2:18
2. "Enochian Calling" – 7:30
3. "Angelic Stations" – 4:59
4. "Finite Bees" – 2:14
5. "Cave of Roses" – 7:58
6. "Sun Ascension" – 4:07
7. "Madriiax" – 7:17
8. "Escalation" – 15:07
9. "Never" – 6:02
10. "Enochian Calling II" – 7:16
11. "Montecute" – 5:07
