= Emre (Dark Matter) =

Compilation album by various
- Released: 6 January 2004
- Genre: experimental
- Label: Source Research sR 99/00:1CD

Emre (Dark Matter) (or Emre [Dark Matter]) is a compilation album released on CD in a regular and limited-edition version. The limited-edition version was limited to a pressing of 500, in heavy card slipcase with a second booklet.

== Track listing ==
1. Source Research: "Open/Threshold" - 1:35
2. Cyclobe: "Silent Key" - 14:36
3. Andrew Poppy: "Blind Fold" - 12:39
4. CoH: "Netmörk" - 12:02
5. Source Research + Leif Elggren: "Fear (The Scuffle Of Angels)" - 13:00
6. Coil: "Broken Aura" - 8:05
7. (untitled silent track) - 0:09
8. (untitled silent track) - 0:09
9. (untitled silent track) - 0:09
10. (untitled silent track) - 0:09
11. (untitled silent track) - 0:09
12. (untitled silent track) - 0:09
13. (untitled silent track) - 0:09
14. (untitled silent track) - 0:09
15. (untitled silent track) - 0:09
16. (untitled silent track) - 0:09
17. (untitled silent track) - 0:09
18. (untitled silent track) - 0:09
19. (untitled silent track) - 0:09
20. (untitled silent track) - 0:09
21. (untitled silent track) - 0:09
22. Ovum: "Inonia" - 10:58
23. Source Research: "Close/Dark Of Heartness II" - 4:11
