= Dolbied =

Studio album by Vortex Campaign / Coil / The New Blockaders
- Released: 1984
- Genres: Noise; industrial
- Label: VC

Dolbied was a cassette release featuring five untitled noise tracks, two of them collaborations between Vortex Campaign, Coil and The New Blockaders, two of them solely by The New Blockaders and one solely by Vortex Campaign.

== Release history ==
The initial release was a limited edition of 50 copies packaged in a cloth bag with cards of visuals by Vortex Campaign. A version by RRRecords is a bootleg that has been issued in several different editions. An LP bootleg is rumored to exist.

In September 2004, Vortex Campaign released an album called The Melancholy Mad Tenant which included all three tracks from Dolbied involving the group.

== Track listing ==
Side A

1. The New Blockaders: (untitled)
2. Coil, The New Blockaders & Vortex Campaign: (untitled)
3. The New Blockaders: (untitled)
4. Coil, The New Blockaders & Vortex Campaign: (untitled)

Side B

1. Vortex Campaign: (untitled)
