= Surkamp =

Surkamp سوركمپ
- Village
- Location within Iran
- Coordinates: 25°34′11″N 60°26′00″E
- Country: Iran
- Province: Sistan and Baluchestan
- County: Konarak
- Bakhsh: Central
- Rural District: Jahliyan

Population (2006)
  - Total: 824
- Time zone: UTC+3:30 (IRST)
  - Summer (DST): UTC+4:30 (IRDT)

Surkamp (Persian: سوركمپ, also Romanized as Sūrkamp; also known as Sūr Kamb, Sūr Kamb, Surkhum, Sūrkhūn, Sūrkhūnī, Sūrkomb, and Surkum) is a village in Jahliyan Rural District, in the Central District of Konarak County, Sistan and Baluchestan Province, Iran. At the 2006 census, its population was 824, in 176 families.
