= Live in Moscow (Coil video) =

Live In Moscow

Video by Coil
- Recorded: 15 September 2001
- Genre: Experimental
- Length: 55:13
- Label: Feelee
- Producer: Coil

Live In Moscow is a VHS of a video recording of Coil. The live performance took place on 15 September 2001 at DK Gorbunova in Moscow, Russia. This video is exactly the same performance as Live Two.

This release was given to attendees at Coil's return to Moscow on 26 September 2002 and was also made available for sale. A box-set edition limited to 35 copies was available. It contained a copy of the video, a T-shirt, a poster and a concert ticket.

Many unofficial bootlegs have surfaced on eBay. This represents Coil's only official video release (prior to the 'Colour Sound Oblivion' box set) other than the ANS DVD.

Unlike the Live in NYC August 18, 2001 VHS, this video does not include any bonus material. However, unlike the Live In NYC August 18, 2001 VHS, the animated video is much more clear. At the end a track list and a list of information in English and Russian scroll signifying the end of the video.

The entire video (as well as an alternate video angle version) is included on the 'Colour Sound Oblivion' 16DVD set.

== Performers ==
- John Balance: vocals
- Peter Christopherson: Macintosh laptop, synths
- Thighpaulsandra: synths, theremin

== Track listing ==
1. "Something"
2. "Higher Beings Command"
3. "Amethyst Deceivers"
4. "What Kind Of Animal Are You?"
5. "Blood From The Air"
6. "The Green Child"
7. "Constant Shallowness Leads To Evil"
