= The Restitution of Decayed Intelligence =

EP by Coil
- Released: May 2003
- Genre: Experimental
- Length: 28:07
- Label: Beta-Lactam Ring MT032
- Producer: Coil

Coil chronology
Live Three (2003)	The Restitution of Decayed Intelligence (2003)	Live Two (2003)

The Restitution of Decayed Intelligence is a 10" vinyl by Coil which heavily references samples from The Remote Viewer. It is named in reference to A Restitution of Decayed Intelligence, a book written in 1605 by Richard Verstegan.

== Release history ==
The record was released in four versions as limited editions:

- 450 numbered copies were pressed on black vinyl.
- 50 numbered copies were pressed on black/white marbled vinyl for series subscribers.
- 100 'artist copies' were pressed on black/white marbled vinyl.
- 6 copies were released in a wooden box with a test pressing along with both black and marbled vinyl.
- The CD (with bonus tracks) was released by Threshold Archives.

In addition to John Balance and Peter Christopherson, Thighpaulsandra is credited.

"The Restitution of Decayed Intelligence II (Extract)" appears on the compilation CD The Lactamase 10" Sampler with a track length of 5:01. An mp3 bearing the same name was available for download on Beta-lactam Ring Records website for a limited time, with a track length of 9:02.

The song "Bad Message" from the same session can be found on the compilation Lactamase Bonus Compilation.

== Track listing ==
Side A:

1. "The Restitution of Decayed Intelligence I" – 16:06

Side B:

1. "The Restitution of Decayed Intelligence II" – 12:01
