= ...And the Ambulance Died in His Arms =

Live album by Coil
- Released: April 2005
- Recorded: All Tomorrow's Parties on 4 April 2003
- Genre: Experimental; post-industrial; electronic
- Length: 63:19
- Label: Threshold House THRESH1
- Producer: Coil

Coil chronology
Selvaggina, Go Back into the Woods (2004)	...And the Ambulance Died in His Arms (2005)	The Ape of Naples (2005)

Professional ratings
Review scores
Source	Rating
AllMusic	3.5/5 stars
Stylus Magazine	B+

...And the Ambulance Died in His Arms is an album recorded live during Coil's performance at All Tomorrow's Parties on 4 April 2003. This album was the last planned release by Coil before the death of John Balance. When the release was announced, Peter noted that Balance had already selected the title.

== Background ==
A version of "Triple Sun Introduction" and "Triple Sons and the One You Bury" using the audio from this performance was reworked and released on The Ape of Naples.

"A Slip in the Marylebone Road" is a true story about John Balance being mugged and losing his "precious green notebook."

"The Dreamer Is Still Asleep – The Somnambulist in an Ambulance" is one of the more improvised live recordings of Coil's performances. The song is a version of "The Dreamer Is Still Asleep" from Musick to Play in the Dark Vol. 1.

== Track listing ==
No.	Title	Length
1.	"Triple Sun Introduction"	4:08
2.	"Snow Falls into Military Temples"	16:50
3.	"A Slip in the Marylebone Road"	11:00
4.	"Triple Sons and the One You Bury"	13:58
5.	"The Dreamer Is Still Asleep – The Somnambulist in an Ambulance"	17:23
Total length:		63:19
