= Threshold House =

Record label

- Founded: 1987–2003 (LOCI); 2003–present (THRESH & THBKK)
- Founder: John Balance; Peter Christopherson
- Genre: Industrial, Experimental
- Country of origin: Thailand (formerly England)
- Location: Krung Thep
- Official website: threshold.greedbag.com

Threshold House is one of several record labels created by Coil to release their own work and that of affiliated projects. Associated labels include Eskaton and Chalice. It is also the name for the official Coil website.

The label was initially a vanity label of sorts, as all releases were manufactured and distributed by other labels, most prominently World Serpent Distribution. Following the bankruptcy of World Serpent, the label continued independently.

The logo for Threshold House is a castle-like building, possibly what Coil have referred to as "The East Tower" in past interviews, and a moon. It is also very similar to artist recreations of the buildings at Catalhoyuk.

After the death of John Balance and the disbanding of Coil, Peter Christopherson started a solo effort, The Threshold HouseBoys Choir, based on the name Threshold House.

== Releases ==
=== LOCI ===
The series of "LOCI" were released when Coil resided in England.

Catalogue number	Release title	Format	Release date
LOCI 1	Gold Is the Metal (With the Broadest Shoulders)	12″	1987
LOCI S1	Themes for Derek Jarman's Blue	7″	1993
LOCI 2	The Wheel	7″	1987
LOCI CD2	Unnatural History	CD	1990
LOCI 3	Windowpane	12″	1990
LOCI CD4	Stolen & Contaminated Songs	CD	1992
LOCI 5	How to Destroy Angels (Remixes and Re-Recordings)	CD	1992
LOCI CD 6	The Angelic Conversation	CD	1994
LOCI CD 7	Windowpane & the Snow	CD	1995
LOCI 8	[unused]		
LOCI 9	[unused]		
LOCI CD 10	Unnatural History II	CD	1995
LOCI CD 11	Gold Is the Metal (With the Broadest Shoulders)	CD	1996
LOCI CD 12	Unnatural History III	CD	1997
LOCI CD 13	Transparent	CD	1998
LOCI 14	Astral Disaster	12″	2000
LOCI CD 14	Astral Disaster	CD	2000
LOCI CD 15	Scatology	CD	2001
LOCI CD 16	Horse Rotorvator	CD	2001
LOCI CD 17	Love's Secret Domain	CD	2001
LOCI CD 18	Live One	2×CD	2003
LOCI CD 19	Live Two	CD	2003
LOCI CD 20	Live Three	CD	2003
LOCI CD 21	Live Four	CD	2003

=== THRESH & THBKK ===
The "THRESH" and "THBKK" series began with Peter Christopherson's relocation to Bangkok, Thailand.

Artist	Catalogue number	Release title	Format	Release date
Coil	THRESH1	...And the Ambulance Died in His Arms	CD	4 April 2003
Coil	THRESH2	The Ape of Naples	CD	2 December 2005
Coil	THRESH2	The Ape of Naples	2×12″	2 December 2005
Coil	THBKK1	The Remote Viewer (remastered edition)	2×CD	2006 August
Coil	THBKK2	Black Antlers (remastered edition)	2×CD	2006 August
The Threshold HouseBoys Choir	THBKK3	Form Grows Rampant	CD + DVD	2007
Coil	THBKK4	The New Backwards	12″	2008
Coil	THBKK4	The New Backwards	CD	2008

== See also ==
- List of record labels
- List of electronic music record labels
