= Danny Hyde =

- Genres: Industrial music, Acid house, Electronic music, Experimental music
- Occupation: Musician
- Years active: 1984–present
- Labels: Eskaton, Infinite Fog Productions, Cold Spring Records

Danny Hyde is an experimental musician and remix artist. Hyde has contributed to production and mixing on many Coil albums, including Horse Rotorvator, Love's Secret Domain, The Remote Viewer, Black Antlers, The Ape of Naples and The New Backwards. Hyde has also worked with Psychic TV and Pop Will Eat Itself. Hyde participated in the creation of many remixes while working with Coil, including several for Nine Inch Nails that were released on Fixed, Closer To God and certified gold release Further Down the Spiral as well as the rerelease of quadruple-platinum album The Downward Spiral. His remix of Nine Inch Nails' song "Closer" was featured in the film Seven.

Hyde's solo effort, Aural Rage, features contributions by Coil members John Balance and Peter Christopherson. Following the passing of John Balance and the subsequent end of Coil, Hyde assisted Christopherson with The Remote Viewer and Black Antlers reissues, Christopherson's solo project The Threshold HouseBoys Choir and the initial work on Throbbing Gristle/X-TG's cover of Nico's Desertshore.

In 2010, Hyde contributed several remixes to Ektoise's Remember Well EP before releasing an EP of his own the next year, Aural Rage's Svay Pak. 2012 saw the release of an EP by Electric Sewer Age, comprising recordings made with Peter Christopherson that were intended for release on Coil's as yet unissued Moon's Milk (In Four Phases) remaster.

== Discography ==
=== Aural Rage ===
- A Nature of Nonsense (2005)
- Sinsemilla Dreams (2006)
- Svay Pak (2011)

Compilation appearances

- "I Don't Need That Deviant Sex" on X-Rated: The Dark Files.

=== Electric Sewer Age ===
- Moon's Milk in Final Phase (2012)
- Bad White Corpuscle (2014)
- Contemplating Nothingness (2019)

=== Remixes ===
- The Chills: "House with a Hundred Rooms" from House with a Hundred Rooms
- Fangoria: "Rendirse No Es Perder (La Mezcla Que Esta Triste Y Azul)" from Un Dia Cualquiera En Vulcano Super Extended Play 2.0 and "En La Disneylandia Del Amor (Mr. Hyde Visita El Túnel Del Amor)" from En La Disneylandia Del Amor
- Nine Inch Nails: "Gave Up" from Fixed, "Closer (Precursor)" from "Closer to God", "The Downward Spiral (The Bottom)", "Eraser (Denial; Realization)", "Eraser (Polite)" and "Erased, Over. Out" from Further Down the Spiral (with Coil)
- Scorn: "Ellipsis" from Gyral (with Coil)
- Chris & Cosey: "Cowboys in Bangkok (Coil vs Elph Mix)" from Twist (with Coil)
- Psychick Warriors ov Gaia: "Kraak (Coil Remix)" from Rejammed: Kraak Remixes (with Coil)
- Tactile: "Intervention 1 - Tactile Vs. Coil" from Recurrence & Intervention (with Coil)
- Depeche Mode: "Rush (Black Sun Remix)" from Remixes 81–04 (with Coil)
- Mink: "Ride (Danny Hyde Remix)" from Splicing The Icy Expanse
- Ektoise: "Remember Well (Danny Hyde's Moody Rice mix)" and "Remember Well (Danny Hyde's Aural Rage mix)" from Remember Well
