= The Remote Viewer =

Studio album by Coil
- Released: May 2002
- Length: 48:43 (2002 version); 1:08:04 (2006 version)
- Label: Threshold House
- Producer: Coil

Coil chronology
Moon's Milk (In Four Phases) Bonus Disc (2002)	The Remote Viewer (2002)	The Golden Hare with a Voice of Silver (2002)

Coil album chronology
Constant Shallowness Leads to Evil (2000)	The Remote Viewer (2002)	ANS (2003)

The Remote Viewer is an album by Coil. The three-track album was released in May 2002 in an edition of 500 copies. The album was later re-edited by Peter Christopherson and expanded to include a second CD of two new tracks. The second edition was released in August 2006 on the same day as the expanded version of Black Antlers. Both reissues were mastered by Mark Godwin and printed in Thailand. Although the original edition did not include a catalog number, the reissue was given a catalog number of THBKK1.

== Track listing ==
Original 2002 release
No.	Title	Length
1.	"Remote Viewing 1"	19:31
2.	"Remote Viewing 2"	7:59
3.	"Remote Viewing 3"	21:13
Total length:		48:43

2006 re-release, disc 1
No.	Title	Length
1.	"Remote Viewing 1"	19:31
2.	"Remote Viewing 2"	7:59
3.	"Remote Viewing 3"	21:13

2006 re-release, disc 2
No.	Title	Length
1.	"Remote Viewing 4"	9:53
2.	"Remote Viewing 5"	9:26
Total length:		68:04

== Personnel ==
- Jhonn Balance
- Peter Christopherson
- Ossian Brown
- Cliff Stapleton
- Mike York
- Danny Hyde
