= Unnatural History III =

Compilation album by Coil
- Released: June 1997
- Genre: Experimental
- Length: 1:15:23
- Label: Threshold House
- Producer: Coil

Coil chronology
Windowpane & The Snow (1995)	Unnatural History III (1997)	Spring Equinox: Moon's Milk or Under an Unquiet Skull (1998)

Professional ratings
Review scores
Source	Rating
AllMusic	4/5 stars

Unnatural History III, subtitled Joyful Participation in the Sorrows of the World, is the third and final release in the Unnatural History series of compilation albums by British experimental band Coil. Unlike the compilations Stolen & Contaminated Songs and Gold Is the Metal with the Broadest Shoulders, the Unnatural History albums collect songs from more than one era of Coil's work.

== Song origins ==
- "First Dark Ride" was originally released on the Coil vs. The Eskaton 12″ "Nasa Arab".
- "Baby Food" was originally released on the compilation Chaos in Expansion.
- "Music for Commercials" originally appeared on the 10″ & cassette versions of The Unreleased Themes for Hellraiser. The version appearing on this compilation was remastered from the cassette release, because the masters were lost.
- According to John Balance, "Panic" was mislabeled in the CD booklet as being the 'Dionysian' remix, commenting, "But then again, isn't everything Dionysian."
- "Neither His nor Yours" was originally released on the compilation A Diamond Hidden in the Mouth of a Corpse.
- "Feeder" was originally released on the album Core - A Conspiracy International Project by Conspiracy International, a label run by Throbbing Gristle members Chris & Cosey.
- "Wrong Eye" and "Scope" were originally released on the 7" single "Wrong Eye/Scope". These two songs were released along with "Meaning What Exactly?" on the compilation The Portable Altamont in 1993.
- "Lost Rivers of London" was originally released on the Ptolemaic Terrascope benefit compilation Succour. The song was later remade and released as "London's Lost Rivers" on the vinyl release of the Black Light District album A Thousand Lights in a Darkened Room.

== Track listing ==
No.	Title	Length
1.	"First Dark Ride"	10:53
2.	"Baby Food"	12:32
3.	"Music for Commercials: A) Airline 1, B) Liqueur, C) Perfume, D) Video Recorder, E) Airline 2, F) Natural Gas, G) Cosmetic 1, H) Cosmetic 2, I) Analgesic, J) Road Surface, K) Accident Insurance"	8:45
4.	"Panic (12" Version)"	7:34
5.	"Neither His nor Yours"	2:50
6.	"Feeder"	8:41
7.	"Wrong Eye"	5:59
8.	"Meaning What Exactly?"	3:45
9.	"Scope"	6:37
10.	"Lost Rivers of London"	7:41

== Personnel ==
=== Writing ===
- John Balance – Writing, Performance, Production
- Peter Christopherson – Writing, Performance, Production
- Danny Hyde – Writing (track 1, 2), Engineering (track 5)
- Drew McDowall – Writing (track 1)
- Billy McGee – Writing (track 3, section A)), Double Bass (track 4)
- Andrew Poppy – Writing (track 3, section D))
- Chris Carter – Writing (track 6)
- Cosey Fanni Tutti – Writing (track 6)
- Steven Thrower – Writing (track 6, 7, 8, 9)
- Otto Avery – Writing (track 8)

=== Additional performers ===
Rose McDowall – Vocals (track 7)

Charles Hayward – drums (track 7)

=== Other contributions ===
JG Thirlwell – Production (track 4)

Martyn Phillips – Engineering (track 4)

Nick Blinko – Cover artwork
