= Airborne Bells/Is Suicide a Solution? =

"Airborne Bells/Is Suicide A Solution?"

Single by Coil
- Released: November 1993
- Genre: Dark ambient, drone
- Length: 10:42
- Label: Clawfist
- Producer: Coil

Coil singles chronology
"The Snow" (1991)	"Airborne Bells/Is Suicide A Solution?" (1993)	"Themes for Derek Jarman's Blue" (1993)

Alternative cover
- back cover

"Airborne Bells"/"Is Suicide A Solution?" is a 7" vinyl single by the British experimental music group Coil. The single was number 22 of a series from the "Clawfist Singles Club", with catalogue number XPIG 22.

== Release history ==
The single was released in an edition believed to be between 1,250 and 1,400 copies.

The front cover lists the track name "Airborne Bells", while the vinyl label erroneously refers to the song as "Airbourne Bells".

"Is Suicide A Solution?" is an expanded and remixed version of "Who'll Fall" from Stolen & Contaminated Songs.

The opening lyrics are "I am the loneliest link in a very strange chain." The closing lyrics, played backwards, are "When the gods want to punish you, they answer your prayers..."

The vinyl is etched as follows:

- Side A: HALOGEN REFRACTED THROUGH KERATIN
- Side B: ...UNBORN SMELLS

== Track listing ==
Side A:

1. "Airborne Bells" – 5:21

Side B:

1. "Is Suicide a Solution?" – 5:21
