= Andrew Poppy =

English composer, pianist, and record producer

Andrew Poppy (born 29 May 1954, Kent) is an English post-minimal composer, pianist, and record producer.

== Life and work ==
Poppy studied at Goldsmiths College in the 1970s. In 1981 he was a founder member of minimalist ensemble The Lost Jockey and composed several pieces for them as well as playing piano.

He wrote the orchestral score for Force the Hand of Chance, the debut album by Psychic TV which was released in 1982.

In 1984 he signed to ZTT Records after Paul Morley heard a cassette he had sent the label. His debut solo album The Beating of Wings was released by ZTT in 1985.

== Discography ==
- Cadenza and Matters of Theory from the self-titled LP by The Lost Jockey (1982, Les Disques du Crepuscule)
- Crude Din from "Professor Slack" EP by The Lost Jockey (1982, Operation Twilight 10"; reissued 1983, Battersea Records 12")
- The Beating of Wings (1985, ZTT)
- Alphabed (1987, ZTT)
- Recordings (1992, Bitter and Twisted Records)
- Ophelia/Ophelia (1995, Impetus)
- Rude Bloom (1995, ArtGallery / Wotre Music)
- Time at Rest Devouring Its Secret (2000, Source Research Recordings)
- Another Language (with Claudia Brücken ex. Propaganda singer) (2005, There (there))
- Andrew Poppy on Zang Tuum Tumb - comprises The Beating of Wings, Alphabed, Under the Son (previously unreleased third album for ZTT) plus bonus tracks (2005, ZTT)
- ...and the Shuffle of Things (2008, Field Radio)
- Shiny Floor Shiny Ceiling (2012, Field Radio)
- Hoarse Songs (2019, Field Radio)
- JELLY (2022, Field Radio)
- Ark Hive of A Live (2023, False Walls; 4 CDs/book)

=== Compilation appearances ===
- Emre (Dark Matter) (2000)
- Music from the Edge Vol. 04 (margen Records. mR 0601) Andrew Poppy- Revolution Number Eight: Airport for Joseph Beuys (For Orchestra & Electronic Delays) 11:50
