= Windowpane (song) =

Single by Coil

from the album Love's Secret Domain
- Released: 1990
- Genre: Trance; industrial; house
- Length: 17:19
- Label: Threshold House; Wax Trax!
- Songwriters: Coil (music); John Balance (lyrics)
- Producer: Coil

Coil singles chronology
| "Wrong Eye/Scope" (1990) | "Windowpane" (1990) | "The Snow" (1991) |

Music video
- “Windowpane” on YouTube

Professional ratings
Review scores
| Source | Rating |
|---|---|
| AllMusic | 3/5 stars |

"Windowpane" is a song by British experimental music group Coil, from their third studio album, Love's Secret Domain.

== Background ==
Written and produced by the band with lyrics by John Balance, it was released in 1990 by Threshold House on 12" vinyl and CD; in the US, the single was licensed by the indie record label Wax Trax! Records.

The song's accompanying video was directed by Peter Christopherson. "Windowpane" appears here truncated, missing the backwards vocals as they appear on the end of the song's album version. The "Astral Paddington Mix" is purely instrumental. Regarded as a "proto-'trip-hop'" track, the song refers in the title to LSD encapsulated in thin gelatin squares, with the lyrics referring to the subjective effects of an LSD trip ("See microscopic, see world view, see the future leaking through; see the person who once was you").

== Release history ==
Three versions of this single were pressed on 12" vinyl, a white label promo, a picture disc, and a standard edition on black vinyl. An edition of 5,000 were produced as picture discs, 2,000 of which were purposely destroyed. All versions of the vinyl were released in 1990 and have exactly the same tracks and track timings. All three versions are also etched as follows: Side A: THE CLEARLIGHT..., Side B: AND THE DIAMOND PATH.

Two CD versions were produced. The first one was released on the label Torso, with the catalogue number TORSO CD 174. The second one was released on the label Wax Trax!, with catalogue number WAXCDS 9142. Both CD versions were released in 1990 and have the same tracks and track timings.

== Reception ==
Reviewed at the time of release, Steve Lamacq of NME called the song a "trance-dance masterpiece. This is quite sublime, a liquid wall of pulse beat washes over you to gently lift your feet off the floor. Hypnotic, exotic, and totally seductive music for a brave new world."

== Track listing ==
=== 12" versions ===
Side A:

1. "Windowpane" - 5:48

Side B:

1. "Windowpane (Astral Paddington Mix)" - 5:37

=== CD versions ===
1. "Windowpane (Minimal Mix)" – 5:28
2. "Windowpane" – 5:49
3. "Windowpane (Astral Paddington Mix)" – 5:37
