= The New Backwards =

2008 studio album by Coil

Studio album by Coil
- Released: 18 April 2008
- Recorded: 1993–2007(?)
- Genre: Experimental; post-industrial; electronic
- Length: 1:05:08
- Label: Threshold House
- Producer: Coil

Coil chronology
The Ape of Naples (2005)	The New Backwards (2008)

The New Backwards is an album by Coil released on 18 April 2008. The album is reworked from the Backwards demo, which was originally created for Nothing Records.

== Background ==
The New Backwards was produced by Peter Christopherson and Danny Hyde, and is reworked from the Backwards demo, which was submitted to Torso Records in 1993 and then further recorded at Trent Reznor's Nothing Studios in New Orleans, Louisiana, in the mid-1990s for a planned release on Reznor's Nothing Records imprint on major label Interscope Records. The record was made in Bangkok in 2007.

The album was originally released on 12" vinyl as part of a box set reissue of the album The Ape of Naples. It is currently available on 12" vinyl, compact disc, and downloads in FLAC, aac, and mp3 formats.

On 30 March 2022, the album was re-released in an 'Expanded Edition' through Infinite Fog Productions, which added previously unreleased and unfinished material from the album's recording sessions.

== Track listing ==
=== CD & Digital ===
No.	Title	Length
1.	"Careful What You Wish For"	9:06
2.	"AYOR"	7:40
3.	"Nature Is a Language"	8:00
4.	"Fire of the Green Dragon"	7:54
5.	"Algerian Basses"	5:02
6.	"Copacaballa"	6:50
7.	"Paint Me as a Dead Soul"	6:31
8.	"Backwards"	5:22
9.	"Princess Margaret's Man in the D'jamalfna"	8:45
Total length:		1:05:19

=== 12" vinyl ===
- This is the fourth LP in the four-record The Ape of Naples box set.

Side G
No.	Title	Length
1.	"Careful What You Wish For"	9:07
2.	"Nature Is a Language"	8:00
3.	"Algerian Basses"	5:02

Side H
No.	Title	Length
4.	"Copacaballa"	6:49
5.	"Paint Me as a Dead Soul"	6:29
6.	"Princess Margaret's Man in the D'jamalfna"	8:46
Total length:		44:13

=== Extended Edition bonus tracks ===
No.	Title	Length
10.	"AYOR live pornmod (It's in My Blood) - LIVE GEOFF"	4:53
11.	"Ambient basses hijack mix 1"	6:14
12.	"Wur click wur ruff 1994"	7:14
13.	"Backwards DIST VOX"	6:47
14.	"Drone Geff Master"	7:04
15.	"Carny Master"	7:07
16.	"Drone Skellies"	7:06
17.	"Choir Droney Skellies"	7:03
18.	"Backwards Live WIP-fixed softer backwards"	8:15
Total length:		2:07:02

== Backwards demo ==
Backwards

Studio album by Coil
- Released: Officially unreleased
- Recorded: Unknown (No later than 1993)
- Genre: Experimental
- Length: 47:07
- Producer: Coil

The New Backwards is the final iteration of material that Coil had been working on since at least 1993. The first known version of these songs was a demo tape simply title Backwards, which Coil submitted to their then-current European label, Torso Records, for approval in 1993.

"Bee Has The Photos" and "Egyptian Basses", though often included in bootlegs of the demo, are not considered to be officially part of this bootleg as they were released as part of the Songs of the Week download series and not on the supposed original demo. However, the version from Songs of the Week is an alternate version, much shorter in length.

After the dissolution of Torso records in 1994, much of the material from the demo was further developed at Nothing Studios, with the intent of releasing the album under Nothing Records. During this time, the project received many different names, such as International Dark Skies, God Please Fuck My Mind for Good, Fire of the Mind, and The World Ended a Long Time Ago. However, its release was continuously postponed, and Coil would end up releasing no album through Nothing.

On June 18, 2001, Coil were invited as guests for a broadcast on Dutch radio station Radio 4 to promote an impending live show in the Netherlands. During this broadcast, the entirety of the Backwards demo tape was played live, marking the first official acknowledgement of its existence and its first publication. A four-disc CD-R recording of the entire broadcast was later released in an unknown quantity as Dutch Radio4 Supplement.

On the live Coil album Live Three, a song called "Backwards" is performed. This song is an incarnation of the songs "Simenon" and "Bee Has Photos".

The Ape of Naples is considered to be another reinterpretation of the Backwards demo, as it featured completely reworked versions of "Heaven's Blade", "AYOR" and other songs that are believed to have been originally created around the time of Backwards. Although the album contains a lot of material from the Backwards sessions, the material is so augmented that there are very few recognizable samples.

Further material from the Backwards sessions has since been released as Backwards (through Cold Spring) and Swanyard.

=== Track listing ===
No.	Title	Length
1.	"Heaven's Blade"	7:23
2.	"Wir-Click-Wir"	6:21
3.	"Elves"	3:10
4.	"Simenon"	3:49
5.	"In My Blood"	3:52
6.	"Spastiche"	4:33
7.	"Crumb Tune"	4:33
8.	"March of Time"	6:03
Total length:		39:44

Three extra tracks, "Bee Has the Photos", "Egyptian Basses" and a different version of "Spastiche", have been circulated with the demos.
