= Gold Is the Metal (With the Broadest Shoulders) =

- Original cover

Studio album by Coil
- Released: 1987
- Genre: Experimental
- Length: CD 50:38
- Label: Threshold House
- Producer: Coil

Coil chronology
Horse Rotorvator (1986)	Gold Is the Metal (With the Broadest Shoulders) (1987)	Love's Secret Domain (1991)

Additional covers
- Remastered edition

Professional ratings
Review scores
Source	Rating
AllMusic	4/5 stars
Encyclopedia of Popular Music	3/5 stars

Gold Is the Metal (With the Broadest Shoulders) is the third album released by Coil. It was released in 1987. It is not a proper follow-up to 1986's Horse Rotorvator but more a collection of outtakes and demos from the Scatology, Horse Rotorvator and Hellraiser soundtrack sessions. Some obviously correspond to earlier and later released material ("Golden Hole" to "Penetralia", "...Of Free Enterprise" to "Herald", etc.), while others ("Boy in a Suitcase") do not appear anywhere else. "The Last Rites of Spring" includes a sample by Stravinsky, also used extensively in "The Anal Staircase".

The musicians involved in this album were John Balance, Peter Christopherson, Stephen Thrower, Alex Fergusson, Jim Thirlwell, Billy McGee, and Andrew Poppy.

== Editions ==
The standard 12" was released by the label Threshold House with the catalogue number LOCI 1.

The first edition (2,000 copies) was pressed on red vinyl. The second edition (also 2,000 copies pressed) was black, and the third (unknown quantity, but very few, as, by this time, the CD edition had been released and was more in demand) was transparent. In addition, 25 copies on red vinyl were released with an unfinished sleeve. The first initial copies of this album were shipped with the free 7" singles "The Wheel/The Wheal" and "The Wheal/Keelhauler". "The Wheel/The Wheal" was believed to be shipped with the first 500 copies, then "The Wheal/Keelhauler" with an unknown additional number of copies.

A special art edition of the 12" was released in an edition of 55 under the Threshold House label with the catalogue number LOCI 3, a catalogue number later assigned to the "Windowpane" 12". According to Brainwashed.com, this set sold for £55 via mail order and included the following: "a black vinyl copy of the LP with gold leaf applied to the centre of the front cover where text appears on the regular edition, 'The Wheel/The Wheal' 7" single, three numbered art prints in a lacquer sealed folder, two posters, a booklet of art and collage designed by John Balance, a credits insert, a signed and numbered certificate."

In 1988, the album was also released on CD by the labels Normal and Threshold House. The Normal release had a catalogue number of NORMAL 77 and was released in the Netherlands. The Threshold House release had a catalogue number of LOCI 1 and was released in the United Kingdom. A total of 1,000 numbered copies were produced during this pressing. The last three tracks have indexing problems.

In 1996, the album was repressed under the label Threshold House with catalogue number LOCI CD 11. The artwork for this release is entirely different for this album. The album is subtitled "Returning to the Purity of the Current". This version still suffers from indexing problems.

In 2006, the 1996 version of the album was made available for download at Coil's official site, thresholdhouse.com, in AAC, MP3, and lossless FLAC formats.

The CD pressings included the extra tracks "Hellraiser" and "The Wheal".

== Track listing ==
=== 12" versions ===
Side A:

1. "Last Rites of Spring"
2. "Paradisiac"
3. "Thump"
4. "For Us They Will"
5. "The Broken Wheel"
6. "Boy in a Suitcase"
7. "Golden Hole"
8. "Cardinal Points"

Side B:

1. "Red Slur"
2. "...Of Free Enterprise"
3. "Aqua Regalia"
4. "Metal in the Head"
5. "Either His or Yours"
6. "Chickenskin"
7. "Soundtrap"
8. "The First Five Minutes After Violent Death"

=== CD versions ===
1. "The Last Rites of Spring" – 1:57
2. "Paradisiac" – 2:27
3. "Thump" – 3:17
4. "For Us They Will" – 4:48
5. "The Broken Wheel" – 4:35
6. "Boy in a Suitcase" – 1:12
7. "Golden Hole" – 2:36
8. "Cardinal Points" – 4:19
9. "Red Slur" – 3:08
10. "...Of Free Enterprise" – 1:22
11. "Aqua Regalia" – 1:29
12. "Metal in the Head" – 2:07
13. "Either His, or Yours" – 2:54
14. "Chickenskin" – 2:44
15. "Soundtrap" – 0:38
16. "Hellraiser" – 5:00 (Correct time = 2:43)
17. "The Wheal" – 3:14 (Correct time = 3:15)
18. "The First Five Minutes after Violent Death" – 2:43 (Correct time = 5:00)
