= Love's Secret Domain =

Studio album by Coil
- Released: July 1991
- Recorded: January 1988 – October 1990
- Studios: Matrix Studios, London; Milo Studios, London; Point Studio, London; Bar Maldoror, London
- Genre: Post-industrial
- Length: 60:34
- Labels: Torso; Wax Trax; Threshold House; Infinite Fog
- Producers: Coil and Danny Hyde

Coil chronology
Gold Is the Metal (With the Broadest Shoulders) (1987)	Love's Secret Domain (1991)	Stolen & Contaminated Songs (1992)

Professional ratings
Review scores
Source	Rating
AllMusic	4.5/5 stars
Encyclopedia of Popular Music	3/5 stars

"Windowpane"
Sample of "Windowpane", taken from the album Love's Secret Domain

Love's Secret Domain is the fourth studio album by the British experimental band Coil, released in 1991. The singles released from the album were "Windowpane" and "The Snow". Guest vocalists include Marc Almond on the song "Titan Arch" and Annie Anxiety on the song "Things Happen".

== Background ==
The recording sessions for Love's Secret Domain were characterized by Coil's compulsive drug use at the time, along with sleep deprivation which apparently led to conflict between members; Peter Christopherson remarked that "[he could] remember Balance and Steve having these mad arguments that would go on for 48 hours without sleep over which sequence of words should be used". In a period of constant drug use during the sessions, they both struggled with using the studio mixing room due to constant hallucinations of "10-foot-tall Amazonian warriors and Babylonian kings" who were "crowding" the room. Stephen Thrower admitted he had experienced synchronized hallucinations with Balance during this period.

The album's emphasis on sampling was inspired by the acid house scene, although it is less explicitly indebted to the dance style than the contemporaneous work of Psychic TV.

The cover features a painting by Steven Stapleton originally created on an outhouse door that he found in Cooloorta, the Irish townland where he resides.

A working title for the album was The Side Effects of Life.

The final track, "Love's Secret Domain", borrows lyrics from the song "In Dreams" by Roy Orbison: "In dreams I walk with you / In dreams I talk to you / In dreams you're mine / All the time." Lyrics are also culled from "The Sick Rose" by William Blake, specifically, "O rose, thou art sick", besides a quotation from Arthur Machen's short story "The White People".

Love's Secret Domain was later remastered by Thighpaulsandra with slightly different track lengths.

The song "Disco Hospital" was covered by Matmos on their EP California Rhinoplasty.

LSD (lysergic acid diethylamide) is an obvious acronym for the album title.

== Track listing ==
=== 12" vinyl ===
All lyrics are written by John Balance; all music is composed by Coil.

Side A
No.	Title	Length
1.	"Disco Hospital"	2:17
2.	"Teenage Lightning" ("Teenage Lightning 2" on CD)	4:29
3.	"Windowpane"	5:58
4.	"The Snow"	3:55
5.	"Dark River"	6:27

Side B
No.	Title	Length
6.	"Further Back and Faster"	7:54
7.	"Titan Arch"	5:02
8.	"Chaostrophy"	5:37
9.	"Love's Secret Domain"	3:52

=== CD ===
All lyrics are written by John Balance, except track #3; all music is composed by Coil.

No.	Title	Length
1.	"Disco Hospital"	2:18
2.	"Teenage Lightning 1"	1:49
3.	"Things Happen" (writer: Annie Anxiety Bandez)	4:22
4.	"The Snow"	6:41
5.	"Dark River"	6:27
6.	"Where Even the Darkness Is Something to See"	3:05
7.	"Teenage Lightning 2" ("Teenage Lightning" from original LP)	5:09
8.	"Windowpane"	6:11
9.	"Further Back and Faster"	7:55
10.	"Titan Arch"	5:02
11.	"Chaostrophy"	5:37
12.	"Lorca Not Orca"	2:04
13.	"Love's Secret Domain"	3:52

== Personnel ==
Credits adapted from the liner notes of Love's Secret Domain.

=== Additional musicians ===
- Charles Hayward – drums (tracks: 3, 13)
- Annie Anxiety Bandez – vocals (track 3)
- Mike McEvoy – keyboards (track 4)
- Juan Ramirez – Spanish guitar (tracks: 5, 7, 12)
- Cyrung – didgeridoo (tracks: 5, 6, 9)
- Rose McDowall – backing vocals (track 8)
- Marc Almond – vocals (track 10)
- Billy McGee – orchestra (track 11)
- Audrey Riley – cello (track 11)
- Jane Fenton – cello (track 11)
- Julia Girdwood – oboe (track 11)
- Jos Pook – viola (track 11)
- Sue Dench – viola (track 11)
- Andrew Davies – violin (track 11)
- Clive Dobbins – violin (track 11)
- Gini Ball – violin (track 11)
- Sally Herbert – violin (track 11)

=== Technical personnel ===
- Coil – production
- Danny Hyde – production, programming, engineering
