= Stephen Thrower =

- Born: 9 December 1963 (age 62); Ashton-under-Lyne, Lancashire, England
- Genres: Industrial; post-industrial; ambient; electronic; experimental; drone; noise
- Occupations: Musician; Author
- Instruments: Vocals; Synthesizer; Saxophone; Clarinet; Drums; Piano; Guitar
- Years active: 1980–present
- Label: Phantomcode

Stephen Thrower (born 9 December 1963) is an English musician and author.

== Musical career ==
=== Early career ===
In 1980, Thrower formed the group Possession with Victor Watkins and Anna Virginia War and they released the album The Thin White Arms, Obtusely Angled At The Elbow, Methodically Dipping And Emerging in 1984.

=== Coil ===
After communicating via a series of letters, Thrower worked with the band Coil in 1984 and 1985. In late 1987, Thrower became a full-time member of the band. He contributed to the albums Gold Is the Metal with the Broadest Shoulders, Love's Secret Domain, and Stolen & Contaminated Songs. With Coil, he also worked on several soundtracks including the unreleased soundtrack for Hellraiser by Clive Barker, and recorded the soundtrack to the Derek Jarman film, The Angelic Conversation; he also made appearances in Jarman's films, Caravaggio, The Last of England and Imagining October. Thrower left Coil in 1992.

=== Cyclobe ===
Thrower's current music project is Cyclobe, with Ossian Brown (another former Coil member). Their first two albums, Luminous Darkness and The Visitors, were released on the UK based record label, Phantomcode, whilst their collaboration with Nurse with Wound, Paraparaparallelogrammatica, was issued by the US label Beta Lactam.

As Cyclobe, he wrote the theme music for George Barry's Death Bed: The Bed That Eats, and the first Pakistani horror film, Zibahkhana. In 2009, Thrower contributed an electronic score to the film Down Terrace. The following year with Cyclobe he released the album Wounded Galaxies Tap at The Window, along with a single "The Eclipser" / "The Moths of Pre-Sleep" released by DOT DOT DOT Music. Thrower contributed an opening track to Florian-Ayala Fauna's 2016 album Dark Night of the Soul.

=== Other groups ===
Thrower also records and performs with The Amal Gamal Ensemble, and with David Knight in the group UnicaZürn. The latter's debut album, Temporal Bends, featured artwork and a guest appearance from Danielle Dax.

== Film writing ==
Thrower is also a published author on horror and 'off-mainstream' cinema. In 1985, Thrower began writing reviews for the U.K. horror magazine Shock Xpress before launching his own film periodical Eyeball in 1989. Thrower has authored several works of film history and criticism, such as Beyond Terror: The Films of Lucio Fulci, The Eyeball Compendium, Nightmare USA: The Untold Story of the Exploitation Independents, and the two-volume Murderous Passions: The Delirious Cinema of Jesús Franco.
