= Wrong Eye/Scope =

Single by Coil
- Released: 1990
- Genre: Dark ambient, drone
- Length: 12:40
- Label: Shock
- Producer(s): Coil

Coil singles chronology
| "The Wheal/Keelhauler" (1987) | "Wrong Eye/Scope" (1990) | "Windowpane" (1990) |

Wrong Eye/Scope is a 7" vinyl single by Coil released by the record company Shock.

== Release history ==
This vinyl was pressed in black, with covers of four different colors. 1,000 copies included green covers. 1,000 copies included yellow covers. 974 copies included white covers. 26 copies included pink covers, with a sticker. The pink ones were signed and lettered A-Z. The first three editions came hand numbered; it is unknown if the pink edition was numbered or merely lettered.

The proper speed to play this release is 33 rpm as listed on the back, rather than 45 rpm as listed on the label.

"Both of the tracks appear on The Portable Altamont compilation CD and the anthology release Unnatural History III along with "Meaning What Exactly?", another track recorded around the same time." -Brainwashed.com

The vinyl is etched as follows: Side A: WRONG IS RIGHT Side AA: SHOOT TO LIVE

According to Brainwashed.com: "Wrong Eye" is described by Coil as being a "rough sketch" of the track "Windowpane." Coil has also stated that speculation about "Scope" being an early version of "Her Friends The Wolves" (from Stolen and Contaminated Songs) is false, and that the track was actually a "studio jam" fueled by "experimenting with MDMA".

== Track listing ==
Side A:

1. "Wrong Eye" – 5:59

Side B:

1. "Scope" – 6:41
