= Stolen & Contaminated Songs =

Studio album by Coil
- Released: 11 December 1992
- Genre: Electronic; experimental; post-industrial
- Length: 65:56
- Label: Threshold House
- Producer: Coil

Coil chronology
Love's Secret Domain (1991)	Stolen & Contaminated Songs (1992)	How to Destroy Angels (Remixes and Re-Recordings) (1992)

Professional ratings
Review scores
Source	Rating
AllMusic	4.5/5 stars

Stolen & Contaminated Songs was the first of two albums recorded and produced by the band Coil in 1992. The album is composed of outtakes and unreleased songs from their prior album, Love's Secret Domain.

== Background ==
Although track one is listed as "Futhur", its title is supposed to be "Further", as the track is a variation on "Further Back and Faster" from the Love's Secret Domain sister album.

An alternate version of "Who'll Fall?" was released as "Is Suicide a Solution?" on the single "Airborne Bells/Is Suicide a Solution?".

The song "Omlagus Garfungiloops" features excerpts of dialogue from the 1990 cult film The Reflecting Skin.

After the final track, "Light Shining Darkly", there is a short period of silence before a hidden track plays.

== Release details ==
The first edition (LOCI4) had a different cover and came without info of any kind, except for a small numbered flyer stating "This is stolen and contaminated songs". Some copies have a paper sticker on the back of the CD jewel box with the band name, album title (with "1991 e.v." underneath), tracklist, an address for World Serpent Distribution and a UPC barcode. The later release changed the titles of all of the songs from this edition, albeit with some only having different punctuation.

The album was reissued on CD and vinyl (for the first time) in November 2019 via Cold Spring Records, Coldspring.co.uk.

== Track listing ==
Original titles are in (italics and parentheses) after the relevant songs.

1. "Further" ("As It Really Is") – 4:21
2. "Original Chaostrophy" ("Chaos") – 1:52
3. "Who'll Tell?" ("Who'll Tell") – 3:13
4. "Omlagus Garfungiloops" ("Exploding Frogs") – 4:24
5. "Inkling" ("In the Lost Kingdom") – 3:03
6. "Love's Secret Domain (Original Mix)" ("Love's Secret Domain (Demo)") – 3:57
7. "Nasa-Arab" ("Nasa-Arab (Live)") – 10:59
8. "Who'll Fall?" ("Who'll Fall") – 5:31
9. "The Original Wild Garlic Memory" ("Original Scot Song") – 7:00
10. "Wrim Wram Wrom" ("Wrim-Wram-Wrom") – 3:13
11. "Corybantic Ennui" ("Oboe Cop") – 0:42
12. "Her Friends the Wolves....." ("Her Friends the Wolves") – 10:58
13. "Light Shining Darkly" ("Dark Nova") – 2:45
