= The Ape of Naples =

Studio album by Coil
- Released: 2 December 2005
- Recorded: 1993–2005
- Genres: Experimental; post-industrial; electronic
- Length: 65:36
- Label: Threshold House
- Producer: Coil

Coil chronology
...And the Ambulance Died in His Arms (2005)	The Ape of Naples (2005)	The New Backwards (2008)

The Ape of Naples is the final studio album by the English experimental group Coil. It was released on 2 December 2005 in the UK and Thailand by Threshold House, and has subsequently been reissued by multiple labels. Produced by Peter Christopherson following the death of his bandmate and romantic partner John Balance in 2004, it contains reworked and remixed versions of Coil material dating from 1993 to 2004. The album was dedicated to Balance's memory.

== Background and composition ==
"Fire of the Mind"
Sample of "Fire of the Mind", taken from the album The Ape of Naples

The Ape of Naples is composed of reworked material that Coil had created in varying forms since the inception of Backwards, their aborted Nothing Records album created during a period that Christopherson dubbed "the New Orleans era", as well as songs that were previously only played live in improvisational form on the mini-tours Coil undertook in the early 2000s. The title of the album was originally intended to be Fire of the Mind, which then became the title of the first track. "The Last Amethyst Deceiver" is the "final version" of "Amethyst Deceivers", a track released on the EP Autumn Equinox: Amethyst Deceivers in 1998 and in various versions afterwards; "It's In My Blood" was performed under the original name of "A.Y.O.R."; and "Going Up", the last song on the album, samples John Balance's voice from Coil's final performance at the Dublin Electronic Arts Festival in 2004. Peter Christopherson remarked that Coil's performance of "Going Up" at the festival was "the one and only time John thought of and sang those words...his own epitaph if you like."

Christopherson created the album after Balance's death at their home in Weston-super-Mare on 13 November 2004; with the material he reworked taking on new meanings that he saw throughout the album's production, he felt he didn't "think [he] could have done it any better, so in that sense [he felt] fulfilled, and [was] sure John would feel so, too."

Songs from the New Orleans era which HAD not seemed to have "found their time" suddenly took on a completely new aspect, because of John's death. Miraculously, they changed, morphed, in front of my eyes, and I had numerous "oh my god—THAT's what that's about" revelatory moments. I imagine everyone does, listening to the album knowing what happened, in a way.

== Reception ==
Professional ratings
Review scores
Source	Rating
AllMusic	4.5/5 stars
Pitchfork	7.9/10
Stylus	A−
Head Heritage	(no rating)

The Ape of Naples was well-received by music critics. Pitchfork reviewer Matthew Murphy gave the album a rating of 7.9/10 and described it as "a remarkably unified work, its every meditative gesture alloyed with a looming, unmistakable sense of impending loss and/or transition". AllMusic reviewer James Mason described it as "one of Coil's best albums and one of the best albums of 2005" and described listening to the album as "a bittersweet experience".

== Track listing ==
=== CD pressing ===
No.	Title	Length
1.	"Fire of the Mind"	5:14
2.	"The Last Amethyst Deceiver"	10:11
3.	"Tattooed Man"	6:33
4.	"Triple Sun"	3:46
5.	"It's in My Blood"	4:51
6.	"I Don't Get It"	5:35
7.	"Heaven's Blade"	4:21
8.	"Cold Cell"	4:08
9.	"Teenage Lightning 2005"	7:11
10.	"Amber Rain"	5:12
11.	"Going Up"	8:30
Total length:		65:32

=== Vinyl pressing ===
Side A
No.	Title	Length
1.	"Fire of the Mind"	5:14
2.	"The Last Amethyst Deceiver"	10:11
3.	"Tattooed Man"	6:33
Total length:		21:58

Side C
No.	Title	Length
1.	"Triple Sun"	3:46
2.	"It's in My Blood"	4:51
3.	"I Don't Get It"	5:35
4.	"Heaven's Blade"	4:21
5.	"Cold Cell"	4:08
Total length:		22:41

Side E
No.	Title	Length
1.	"Teenage Lightning 2005"	7:11
2.	"Amber Rain"	5:12
3.	"Going Up"	8:30
Total length:		20:53

Limited edition copies came with a copy of The New Backwards as a fourth piece of vinyl.

The New Backwards, Side A
No.	Title	Length
1.	"Careful What You Wish For"	9:06
2.	"Nature Is a Language"	8:00
3.	"Algerian Basses"	5:02
Total length:		22:08

The New Backwards, Side B
No.	Title	Length
1.	"Copacaballa"	6:49
2.	"Paint Me as a Dead Soul"	6:29
3.	"Princess Margaret's Man in the D'Jamalfna"	8:46
Total length:		22:04

== Personnel ==
- Artwork, photography: Ian Johnstone
- Hurdy-gurdy – Cliff Stapleton
- Keyboards – Thighpaulsandra
- Marimba – Tom Edwards
- Orchestral stylings – Thighpaulsandra (track 5 & 6)
- Performer, sequenced by, sound designer, producer – Peter Christopherson
- Pipes, duduk – Mike York
- Synthesizer – Ossian Brown
- Vocals – John Balance (all), François Testory (track 11)
- Written by, recorded by, producer – Coil (all)
