= Scatology (album) =

- An original Scatology LP cover featuring the "Anal Staircase" postcard

Studio album by Coil
- Released: 1984 (Note: A copyright date.)
- Recorded: 1984 (See "Background and recording" section for details)
- Studios: Wave; Aosis; Bar Maldoror (London)
- Genres: Industrial; post-industrial
- Length: 41:29
- Labels: Force & Form; Some Bizarre; Threshold House
- Producers: Coil; Clint Ruin

Coil chronology
How to Destroy Angels (1984)	Scatology (1984)	Horse Rotorvator (1986)

Singles from Scatology
- 1. "Panic/Tainted Love" Released: May 1985

Professional ratings
Review scores
Source	Rating
AllMusic	4/5 stars
Encyclopedia of Popular Music	3/5 stars
Melody Maker	favourable
NME	positive
Sounds	4.75/5
Time Out	positive

Scatology is the debut studio album by English experimental music group Coil. It was recorded at various studios in London during 1984 and produced by the band along with JG Thirlwell; the album features a prominent appearance of Stephen Thrower, who subsequently became an official member of Coil starting with the group's following album, Horse Rotorvator. Despite its title, the album focuses on alchemy, mainly an idea of turning base matter into gold. The record contains a wide array of cultural references, including to people such as Marquis de Sade, Alfred Jarry, Salvador Dalí, Charles Manson, and others.

Scatology was first released in 1985 (with a 1984 copyright date) on LP, by Force & Form and K.422 (Some Bizzare Records sublabel). It was reissued by Force & Form in 1988 on CD and later by Threshold House in 2001. Scatology’s sole single featured the extended remix of "Panic" with a cover version of "Tainted Love" on its B-side. Mainly positively received by critics, Scatology is considered to be one of Coil's essential releases, and moreover of the 1980s industrial scene.

== Background and recording ==
Work on Scatology began in May 1984, soon after the release of Coil's debut EP How to Destroy Angels. Early on, a track entitled "The Sewage Worker's Birthday Party" was recorded during sessions of the abovementioned EP.

Recording sessions were held at Wave Studios, Aosis Studios and Bar Maldoror (all situated in London). Several tracks during these sessions were recorded, but were not released or metamorphosed into other tracks. (Note: These titles include "Ergot", "Boy in a Suitcase", "Dream Photography", "120 Dalmations in Sodom", "Thermid’or", "The Pope held Upside Down".) The core duo of the band, including Peter Christopherson and John Balance, was extended with an appearance of J. G. Thirlwell of Foetus and Stephen Thrower, the latter of whom met Coil for the first time in August 1984.

== Packaging ==
Different editions of the album featured a variety of packaging designs. For the original LP release, the initial black sun design was covered by a postcard with a motif of a swirling staircase known as the "Anal Staircase". The second edition had the "Sexual Architecture" postcard pasted on a random selection of copies with uncovered ones revealing the original black sun design.

The 1988 CD edition featured artwork depicting a naked pair of buttocks enclosed by an upside-down cross, with the original black sun underneath, seemingly inspired by Man Ray's Monument to Sade photography; the 2001 reissue features a revised artwork from the 1988 edition, with a slogan, "Stevo, Pay Us What You Owe Us!", referencing the band's dispute with Stevo Pearce.

== Track listing ==
=== Original LP release (1984) ===
All tracks are written by John Balance and Peter Christopherson, except noted.

No.	Title	Length
1.	"Ubu Noir"
2.	"Panic" (Balance, Christopherson, Clint Ruin)
3.	"At the Heart of It All" (Balance, Christopherson, Stephen Thrower)
4.	"Tenderness of Wolves" (Balance, Christopherson, Gavin Friday)
5.	"The Spoiler"
6.	"Clap"
7.	"Solar Lodge" (Balance, Christopherson, Thrower)
8.	"The Sewage Worker's Birthday Party"
9.	"Godhead⇔Deathead"
10.	"Cathedral in Flames"

=== CD releases ===
Force & Form release (1988)
No.	Title	Length
1.	"Ubu Noir"	2:09
2.	"Panic"	4:21
3.	"At the Heart of It All"	5:13
4.	"Tenderness of Wolves"	4:25
5.	"The Spoiler"	4:10
6.	"Clap"	1:17
7.	"Restless Day"	4:45
8.	"Aqua Regis"	2:51
9.	"Solar Lodge"	5:35
10.	"The S.W.B.P."	4:24
11.	"Godhead≈Deathead"	5:15
12.	"Cathedral in Flames"	4:39
13.	"Tainted Love" (Ed Cobb)	5:53

Threshold House release (2001)
No.	Title	Length
1.	"Ubu Noir"	2:11
2.	"Panic"	4:23
3.	"At the Heart of It All"	5:15
4.	"Tenderness of Wolves"	4:27
5.	"The Spoiler"	4:12
6.	"Clap"	1:19
7.	"Restless Day"	4:47
8.	"Aqua Regis"	2:53
9.	"Solar Lodge"	5:37
10.	"The S.W.B.P."	4:26
11.	"Godhead≈Deathead"	5:18
12.	"Cathedral in Flames"	4:41
13.	"Tainted Love"	5:53

== Personnel ==
All information adapted from 1984 release sleeve except where noted.

=== Coil ===
- John Balance – lead vocals and lyrics (except instrumentals and noted songs), guitars (on "Panic" and "Solar Lodge"), synthesizer (on "At the Heart of It All"), bass (on "Solar Lodge" and "The Sewage Worker's Birthday Party")
- Peter Christopherson – programming and sampling, piano, backing vocals (on "The Spoiler")

=== Additional musicians ===
- JG Thirlwell (as Clint Ruin) – programming and sampling (on "Panic" and "At the Heart of It All")
- Stephen Thrower – clarinet (on "At the Heart of It All" and "Solar Lodge"), percussion (on "Solar Lodge")
- Gavin Friday – lead vocals and lyrics (on "Tenderness of Wolves")
- Alex Fergusson – acoustic guitar (on "Tenderness of Wolves")
- Marc Almond (as Raoul Revere) – guitar (on "Restless Day")

=== Technical personnel ===
- Coil – co-production, mixing
- JG Thirlwell (as Clint Ruin) – co-production, mixing
- Warne Livesey – engineer
- Christian Fouquet and Lawrence Watson – photography
- Thighpaulsandra – remastering

== Charts ==
Chart (1985)	Peak position
UK Indie Chart	7
