= Horse Rotorvator =

- Original LP cover

Studio album by Coil
- Released: 1986
- Genre: Post-industrial; psychedelia; industrial; avant-garde pop
- Length: 49:15 (Some Bizzare CD version)
- Label: Some Bizzare; Force & Form; Threshold House
- Producer: Coil

Coil chronology
Scatology (1984)	Horse Rotorvator (1986)	Gold Is the Metal (With the Broadest Shoulders) (1987)

Professional ratings
Review scores
Source	Rating
AllMusic	5/5 stars
Encyclopedia of Popular Music	3/5 stars
Pitchfork	9.5/10

Horse Rotorvator is the second studio album by English experimental music group Coil, released in 1986.

The album was ranked No. 73 in the Pitchfork list "Top 100 Albums of the 1980s".

== Background ==
The album title was inspired by a dream of Balance's in which the Four Horsemen of the Apocalypse slit the throats of their horses and assembled their jawbones into a device large enough to "plough up the waiting world." The cover photograph was shot by the band and shows the bandstand in Regent's Park, London, which was subject to the Hyde Park and Regent's Park bombings four years before the album's release.

A cover of Leonard Cohen's "Who by Fire" is featured on the album. "Ostia" meditates on the murder of radical Italian filmmaker Pier Paolo Pasolini. Guests include Marc Almond and his collaborator Billy McGee.

== Release ==
Horse Rotorvator was initially released in the UK in 1986 by Force & Form and was manufactured by K.422, a Some Bizzare Records side label. In the USA, the album was released by Relativity Records. The album was first reissued on CD in 1988.

== Reception ==
AllMusic called the album a "refinement of brute noise and creepily serene arrangements into a truly modern psychedelia, from tribal drumming and death march guitars to disturbing samples and marching band samples and back", crediting the group with "eschewing easy clichés on all fronts to create unnerving, never easily-digested invocations of musical power". Pitchfork named it among the best albums of the 1980s and stated that "the bulk of these songs are grand, sweeping treatments of themes of death and betrayal, wrought in a collage of noise and restless rhythms [...] Equally austere, humorous, and frightening, Horse Rotorvator stands as one of the more unique projects of its decade."

== Track listing ==
All lyrics are written by John Balance; all music is composed by John Balance and Peter Christopherson; except where noted.

Horse Rotorvator track listing
No.	Title	Writer(s)	Length
1.	"The Anal Staircase"		4:00
2.	"Slur"		3:31
3.	"Babylero"		0:52
4.	"Ostia (The Death of Pasolini)"		6:20
5.	"Herald"		1:03
6.	"Penetralia"		6:11
7.	"Ravenous"		3:26
8.	"Circles of Mania"		5:01
9.	"Blood from the Air"		5:32
10.	"Who by Fire"	Leonard Cohen	2:37
11.	"The Golden Section"		5:50
12.	"The First Five Minutes After Death"		4:45

Cassette bonus track
No.	Title	Length
13.	"The Anal Staircase" (A Dionysian Remix)	5:53

Notes

- LP pressings of the album omit "Ravenous". On some of the CD pressings, it is the twelfth track instead of the seventh one. Sometimes the track listing on the packaging and the actual order differ as a result (for example, one ROTA 1 pressing lists the tracks in the above order, but when played, "Ravenous" is a twelfth track).
- On cassette pressings of the album, "Slur" and "Herald" are titled as "Silk" and "Acapulco March", respectively.

== Charts ==
Chart performance for Horse Rotorvator
Chart (1987)	Peak position
UK Indie Chart	3
