= Seven Is a Jolly Good Time =

Compilation album by Egg
- Released: 1985
- Genres: Progressive rock, Canterbury scene
- Length: 44:03
- Label: See For Miles Records
- Producer: Egg

Egg chronology
The Civil Surface (1974)	Seven Is a Jolly Good Time (1985)

Professional ratings
Review scores
Source	Rating
Allmusic	4/5 stars

Seven Is a Jolly Good Time is an Egg compilation album released by See For Miles Records in 1985. It consists of the band’s debut album, Egg (1970), and their earlier (and only) single, “Seven Is A Jolly Good Time”/”You Are All Princes”, released 1969.

The album has not been remastered; rather, the single A- and B-side tracks have been added to the band's first album Egg as bonus material.

== Track listing ==
=== Side one ===
1. "Bulb" – 0:09
2. "While Growing My Hair" – 3:53
3. "I Will Be Absorbed" – 5:10
4. "Fugue In D Minor" – 2:46
5. "They Laughed When I sat Down At The Piano…" – 1:17
6. "The Song Of McGuillicudie The Pusillanimous (or don't worry James, your socks are hanging in the coal cellar with Thomas)" – 5:07
7. "Boilk" – 1:00
8. "You Are All Princes" – 3:46

=== Side two ===
1. "Symphony No. 2"
  - Movement 1 – 5:47
  - Movement 2 – 6:20
  - Blane – 8:42
  - Movement 4 – 4:51
2. "Seven Is A Jolly Good Time" – 2:45

== Personnel ==
- Dave Stewart – organ, piano, tone generator
- Mont Campbell – bass, vocals
- Clive Brooks – drums
