= Chamber Music (Thighpaulsandra album) =

Studio album by Thighpaulsandra
- Released: 2005
- Recorded: Autumn 2004
- Genre: Industrial
- Length: 49:09
- Label: Lumberton Trading Company; LUMB002

Thighpaulsandra chronology
Double Vulgar II (2005)	Chamber Music (2005)	The Lepore Extrusion (2006)

Chamber Music is the fifth album by Thighpaulsandra. The album is the first to be pressed to both CD and vinyl since The Michel Publicity Window E.P.. The vinyl pressing was limited to an edition of 525, hand numbered picture discs.

The cover image, taken by Thighpaulsandra, is titled "The Hunting Party" and features two pairs of brothers: Michael and Mark Edwards, and Lee and Lance Jonathan.

== Track listing ==
All tracks are written by Thighpaulsandra

No.	Title	Length
1.	"Cast in Dead Homes"	9:22
2.	"A Blizzard of Altars"	12:54
3.	"Bleeding Text for the Cripplethrush"	12:28
4.	"The Unwilling Wardens of Ice"	14:26
Total length:		49:09

== Personnel ==
- Thighpaulsandra: vocals, keyboards, synthesizers, piano, harpsichord, French horn, celeste, mellotron
- Siôn Orgon: drums, tamtams; AudioMulch on "A Blizzard of Altars" and "The Unwilling…"; tympani and shortwave radio on "Bleeding Text…"; vocals and wine glasses on "The Unwilling…"
- Martin Schellard: Guitars, pedal steel guitar
- Frank Naughton: Violin; treated snare drum on "Cast in Dead Homes"; piano on "The Unwilling…"
- Tom Edwards: Marimba on "Cast in Dead Homes"
- Weremia de Spaceboy: "Phantomick presence" on "A Blizzard of Altars"
- Ryan St. John: Piano on "A Blizzard of Altars"
- Robert Greensmith: "Relentless stomping" on "Bleeding Text…"
