= There Is No Space for Us =

Studio album by Hawkwind
- Released: 18 April 2025
- Genre: Space rock
- Length: 53:09
- Label: Cherry Red

Hawkwind chronology
Stories from Time and Space (2024)	There Is No Space for Us (2025)

Singles from There Is No Space for Us
- 1. "The Co-Pilot" Released: 14 March 2025; 2. "A Long Long Way From Home" Released: 4 April 2025

There Is No Space for Us is the thirty-seventh studio album by English space rock band Hawkwind. It was released on 18 April 2025, by Cherry Red Records, in CD, vinyl, digital download, and streaming formats.

== Background ==
Described as an album focusing on synth, and "more straightforward" compared with previously released albums, The Future Never Waits and Stories from Time and Space, There Is No Space for Us consists of eight songs with a total runtime of over fifty-three minutes.

The album's first single "The Co-Pilot" was released on 14 March 2025, and the second single "A Long Long Way From Home" was released on 4 April 2025. (Note: Adapted from Spotify) The vinyl-only version of the album consists of two additional songs, "Practical Ability" and "Second Chance".

The bonus tracks on the vinyl edition of the album previously appeared on the album Live at the Royal Albert Hall, among a series of bonus tracks recorded during rehearsals for the band's 2024 live dates.

== Reception ==
Professional ratings
Review scores
Source	Rating
AllMusic	4/5 stars
Classic Rock	3.5/5 stars
Louder Than War	3.5/5 stars
Prog	4/5 stars
Record Collector	4/5 stars

The Quietus noted that "There Is No Space for Us is certainly more straightforward than its predecessors, though it's no less creative for the exercise of reining in some of their more indulgent moments." AllMusic stated that the album "sounds more holistic than its trilogy predecessors, with leaner production, deft arrangements, and extremely inventive songwriting."

Classic Rock gave the album a rating of three and a half stars out of five and remarked, "There Is No Space for Us is about maintaining their vision, although its dystopian elements take on an unfortunate pertinence in the light of Trumpism, Elon Musk and the catastrophes they might portend," while Prog Magazine rated it four stars, referring to the album as "another impressive blend of familiar elements and stylistic surprises in what's effectively a sister album to Stories From Time and Space."

Louder Than War assigned the album a rating of three and a half stars, stating "This record may not win the band many new converts, although it's as good a place as any to sign up." Blabbermouth described the album as "blending hypnotic rhythms, immersive synths, and driving guitar riffs," while Record Collector noted that it is "sharper" than its predecessor, rating it four stars.

== Track listing ==
There Is No Space for Us (standard edition) track listing
No.	Title	Writer(s)	Length
1.	"There Is Still Danger There"	Dave Brock	5:35
2.	"Space Continues (Lifeform)"	Brock; Tim Lewis	8:17
3.	"The Co-Pilot"	Brock	8:22
4.	"Changes (Burning Sons and Frozen Waste)"	Brock; Magnus Martin	9:14
5.	"There Is No Space for Us"	Brock	3:40
6.	"The Outer Region of the Universe"	Martin	7:56
7.	"Neutron Stars (Pulsating Light)"	Brock	4:57
8.	"A Long Long Way From Home"	Brock	5:08
Total length:			53:09

There Is No Space for Us (Vinyl edition) track listing
No.	Title	Writer(s)	Length
9.	"Practical Ability"	Brock; Doug MacKinnon; Martin; Lewis; Richard Chadwick	14:29
10.	"Second Chance"	Brock; MacKinnon; Martin; Lewis; Chadwick	5:27
Total length:			73:05

== Personnel ==
- Stuart Bladen – artwork (Note: Adapted from AllMusic)
- Dave Brock – guitar, keyboards, synthesizer, vocals
- Richard Chadwick – drums, percussion, vocals
- Dale Cherry – photography
- Rob Godwin – photography
- Doug MacKinnon – bass
- Magnus Martin – guitar, keyboards, synthesizer, vocals
- Kris Tait – coordination
- Timothy Lewis – keyboards, synthesizer

== Charts ==
Chart performance for There Is No Space for Us
Chart (2025)	Peak position
French Rock & Metal Albums (SNEP)	64
Scottish Albums (Official Charts)	5
UK Album Downloads (Official Charts)	13
UK Independent Albums (Official Charts)	1
UK Rock & Metal Albums (Official Charts)	1
