= Rite² =

Studio album by Julian Cope
- Released: May 1997
- Studio: Nolatone; Harveytron Foundation
- Genre: Ambient, krautrock
- Length: 55:14
- Label: Head Heritage
- Producer: Julian Cope

Julian Cope chronology
Interpreter (1996)	Rite² (1997)	Odin (1999)

Professional ratings
Review scores
Source	Rating
Allmusic	4/5 stars
The Great Rock Discography	6/10 stars
NME	4/10

Rite² is an ambient music album by Julian Cope, released in 1997. It is technically Cope's fourteenth solo album, but is also the follow-up to the earlier album Rite (released in 1992 and credited to "Julian Cope & Donald Ross Skinner") and is the second in the Rite series.

For Rite², Cope collaborated extensively with synthesizer player Thighpaulsandra (Coil, Spiritualized) although the album was credited to Cope alone. The album has been described as a tribute of sorts to Krautrock bands such as Amon Düül II and Tangerine Dream and is based on the sound of the Mellotron and the wah-wah guitar, although it also employs miscellaneous tone generators the ARP 2600 synthesizer and the Hammond B3 organ, as well as vocal chants.

Rite² was the debut release on Cope's Head Heritage label, which would be the home of almost all of his future recordings.

== Critical reception ==
John Bush of Allmusic called Rite² "one of Julian Cope's most consistent works" and commented: "Instead of leaping to and fro between undeniably catchy synth-pop and fractured end-of-the-century prog, Cope sticks to the prog and comes out better for it."

== Track listing ==
No.	Title	Writer(s)	Length
1.	"Ver"	Julian Cope, Thighpaulsandra	10:47
2.	"Hill of Odin"	Cope, Donald Ross Skinner	15:37
3.	"D-c.o.m.p.o.s.e.r."	Cope, Thighpaulsandra	19:15
4.	"The Ringed Hills Of Ver"	Cope, Mark Cosby, Skinner	9:35

== Personnel ==
Credits adapted from the album's liner notes.

Musicians

- Julian Cope – vocals, acoustic and electric guitar, Mellotron 400 and Mark 2
- Thighpaulsandra – grand piano, ARP 2600, Mellotron 400, Faerial 5
- Mark "Rooster" Cosby – crystal machine, tone generator, accordion
- Donald Ross Skinner – Hammond B3 organ, crystal machine and alto stylophone
- Jody Evans – kraut/stereo presence and un-rec. percussions

Technical

- Julian Cope – producer, directed by
- Thighpaulsandra – recorded by, computed by
- Shaun Harvey – recorded by
- Adam Fullerton – Mr. Sandra's modifications
- Martin Smith – all Mellotronic maintenance
- John Bradley – all Mellotronic maintenance
- Get Carter/Copix – design
