= Discover Odin =

Studio album by Julian Cope
- Released: 2001
- Genre: Spoken word, ambient, space rock, neo-psychedelia
- Length: 46:04
- Label: Head Heritage

Julian Cope chronology
An Audience With the Cope 2000/2001 (2000)	Discover Odin (2001)	Rite Now (2002)

Professional ratings
Review scores
Source	Rating
Allmusic	3/5 stars
The Great Rock Discography	5/10

Discover Odin is an album and booklet written by Julian Cope and released in a limited edition in 2001. It was produced in collaboration with the British Museum as a companion CD programme to Cope's two nights of spoken word and music at the museum on 4–5 October 2001 in London. The album comprises a mixture of musical and spoken tracks.

In the first track, "The 18 Charms of Odin", Cope provides musical accompaniment to the text of the epic Norse poem Hávamál, in Kevin Crossley-Holland's version, as published in The Norse Myths.

The second track "Discover Odin" is Cope's spoken account of the alleged misinterpretation of the Norse myths by Roman historians and Christians, with comments on the religious traditions of Nordic cultures and their Neolithic forebears. Cope suggests that Odin originated as a weather god and as the shaman Óðr.

Later tracks mix musical and spoken material on the subject of the Odin stone of Orkney, the neolithic hill of Silbury and Yggdrasil, the ash tree depicted as the world tree.

The final track is a recording of a poem read by its author Vachel Lindsay (1879–1931).

The music ranges from ambient to psychedelic and space rock, especially when accompanied by Japanese psychedelic rock band Karuna Khyal on the track "Ode to Wan".

== Track listing ==
No.	Title	Length
1.	"The 18 Charms of Odin"	8:56
2.	"Discover Odin"	11:47
3.	"Ode to Wan (Parts 1&2)"	2:20
4.	"Yggdrasil & the Stone of Odin"	3:26
5.	"Road to Yggdrasilbury"	18:03
6.	"I want to go Wandering"	1:33

== Personnel ==
- Julian Cope – vocals, Mellotron, organ, guitar, bass
- Thighpaulsandra – synthesizer, keyboards, trumpet on "Ode to Wan (Part 2)"
- Karuna Khyal – all music on "Ode to Wan (Part 1)"
- Terry Edwards – saxophone on "Discover Odin"
- Donald Ross Skinner – drums on "Road to Yggdrasilbury"
- Vachel Lindsay – vocal on "I want to go Wandering"
