= Rape Scene (disambiguation) =

Rape Scene is a 2004 album by Thighpaulsandra.

Rape scene is a setting where a rape has taken place, either fictional or real.

Rape scene may also refer to:

- Untitled (Rape Scene), a 1973 work by Ana Mendieta
