= An Audience with the Cope 2000 =

An Audience With the Cope 2000/2001
- Original 2000 cover art

Studio album by Julian Cope
- Released: 2000
- Genre: Indie rock
- Length: 56:18
- Label: Head Heritage
- Producer: Julian Cope

Julian Cope chronology
Odin (1999)	An Audience With the Cope 2000/2001 (2000)	Discover Odin (2001)

Alternative cover
- 2001 reissue cover

Professional ratings
Review scores
Source	Rating
Encyclopedia of Popular Music	2/5 stars
The Great Rock Discography	6/10

An Audience With the Cope 2000 is the sixteenth solo album by Julian Cope.

The album was originally released in 2000 as a "souvenir CD concert programme," provided to tie in with Cope's 2000 live concert tour. It contained a variety of material varying from psychedelic pop songs to space rock instrumentals. In 2001, the album was reissued with different artwork and a slightly altered title, An Audience With the Cope 2001, but an identical track listing.

== Track listing ==
1. "The Glam Dicenn (Parts 1&2)" – 9:35
2. "Holy Mother of God" – 4:10
3. "Born To Breed" – 5:11
4. "Ill Informer" – 10:10
5. "The Glam Dicenn (Parts 3&4)" – 16:36
6. (Untitled hidden track) – 5:36

Note

- Track 6 appears after 5 minutes of silence.

== Personnel ==
- Julian Cope – vocals, guitar, bass, mellotron, keyboards, production
- Thighpaulsandra – synthesizer, piano, organ, engineer
- Anthony "Doggen" Foster – guitar
- Cliff Cheerio – synthesizer, cover photography
- Kevin "Kevlar" Bales – drums

Technical

- David Wrench – engineer
- Terry Dobbin – engineer
- Quinner – photography
