= Uriel (band) =

English psychedelic blues-rock band

- Origin: London, England
- Genres: Psychedelic rock; blues rock
- Years active: 1968–1969
- Spinoffs: Egg, Khan
- Past members: Steve Hillage; Dave Stewart; Clive Brooks; Mont Campbell

Uriel were an English psychedelic blues-rock band formed in 1968, consisting of Steve Hillage (guitar/vocals), Dave Stewart (organ), Clive Brooks (drums) and Mont Campbell (bass/vocals). The band produced their sole album under the name Arzachel in June 1969.

== History ==
Formed while Hillage, Campbell and Stewart were at the City of London School, they initially played covers of Cream, Jimi Hendrix, John Mayall & the Bluesbreakers and the Nice. After Hillage left in mid-1968 to attend university, the remaining trio began playing original material written by Campbell and Stewart. Bowing to pressure from their managers, they changed their name to Egg in early 1969. Shortly after Egg signed to Decca, a tiny company named Zackariya Enterprises gave the musicians an opportunity to record a psychedelic session for the burgeoning market. Since this was not "Egg material" (and besides, they were under contract now to Decca), Uriel re-united to produce their sole album in June 1969, a one-off psychedelic project under an assumed name Arzachel (named after a crater on the moon, itself named after a medieval Spanish astronomer). The musicians also used pseudonyms on the album, although their biographies each contain some measure of truth:

- Simeon Sasparella (Steve Hillage) - lead guitar and vocals. Sim was born in Seatoller, Cumberland in 1948, and has been playing guitar for 11 years. His dark Northern ruggedness is offset by the coolness of his manner. These two qualities are reflected in his playing – heavy, emotional work, and soft, subtle sounds. He believes that music is the only really physical art form – and is in a lifelong search for the ultimate musical power, on the same scale as the rocky Lake District crags from whence he came.
- Njerogi Gategaka (Mont Campbell) – bass guitar and vocals. Njerogi was born in Mzumi Springs, a small border town in the north of the Kenyan Rift Valley. He trained to be a Manjanga drummer for the local Kyuma dances, but came to England with family in 1962. He lived in Brighton for five years, then moved to London, where he formed Arzachel with Sim, Basil and Sam. He believes that music stems largely from the sexual urge, both of which have an integral part in rhythm, having been taught this as part of his drum training.
- Basil Dowling (Clive Brooks) – drums. Basil was born in Tottenham in 1947; as one would expect, he was an ardent Tottenham Hampton F.C. supporter in his younger days, but decided it would no longer be wise to go to football matches when his wiry bushy hair reached shoulder-length. He has been in seven groups, playing every conceivable style of music from dance band to skiffle. Basil is a heavy, violent drummer; he has been known to break fourteen sticks in as many bars. He believes that if it were not for Arzachel's music, his violence would still be expressed in seat-slashing and toilet-roll throwing.
- Sam Lee-Uff (Dave Stewart) – organ. Sam was born in Lewisham in 1949 – he could play the piano when only two years old, and began to take organ lessons at the age of seven. He was expelled from public school, and spent eight months living on crusts, playing a battered accordion on street corners. This he refers to as his "hang-up" period. When the Psychedelic scene began to blossom, Sam joined various unsuccessful groups. Arzachel was a result of meeting up with Sim and Njerogi. Sam's favourite artistes include Heinz; Mike Ratledge; Holst; P.J. Proby; Vincent Crane. He believes music to be an expression of one's inner being – this expression, he says, will lead to the ultimate spiritual liberation of one's personality.

== Arzachel ==
The album Arzachel was recorded and mixed in a single session in London. The 'A' side has four songs, while the 'B' side consists of only two mind-bending psychedelic tracks, the longer of which is a 17-minute jam entitled 'Metempsychosis'. It was issued on the short-lived Evolution label (also home to the debut by Raw Material) and quickly became a collector's item. A pirate version is thought to have circulated in the late 1970s, and it has been much bootlegged in more recent years. It was eventually released on CD by Demon Records in 1994.

=== Track listing ===
No.	Title	Writer(s)	Length
1.	"Garden of Earthly Delights"	Philip Rosseter, Martin Shaw (arranged by Mont Campbell)	2:45
2.	"Azathoth"	Campbell, Dave Stewart	4:21
3.	"Soul Thing (Queen Street Gang Theme)" (sometimes listed as "Queen St. Gang")	Keith Mansfield (arranged by Campbell)	4:25
4.	"Leg"	Steve Hillage, Antony Vinall	5:40
5.	"Clean Innocent Fun"	Hillage, Vinall	10:23
6.	"Metempsychosis"	Clive Brooks, Campbell, Hillage, Stewart	16:38

=== Reissue ===
The album was re-released on 7 December 2007 as Arzachel Collectors Edition by Uriel (2007, Egg Archive CD69-7201). This official band release features a re-mastered version of the original album plus four unreleased Uriel studio demos, a spoken-word message from the past and a live snippet recorded in 1968. Steve Hillage plays on two of these bonus tracks. The CD also contains a 20-page booklet telling the group's history in the musicians' own words, along with period photos and artwork.

Also available is a 26,000-word, 60-page companion booklet Copious Notes. Written by Dave Stewart, Mont Campbell and their close friend Antony Vinall, it tells the inside story of Uriel, Egg, Arzachel and the Ottawa Company from the formation of Uriel in early 1968 to the making of Egg's final album The Civil Surface in 1974. The text includes personal memoirs, anecdotes, short stories, random recollections, social observation, period details, musical analysis and song lyrics, as well as a collection of archive photos taken by Terry Yetton and the musicians.
