= Double Vulgar II =

Studio album by Thighpaulsandra
- Released: 28 November 2005
- Genre: Industrial, electronic, glitch
- Length: 79:10
- Label: Beta-lactam Ring Records mt089a

Thighpaulsandra chronology
Rape Scene (2004)	Double Vulgar II (2005)	Chamber Music (2005)

Double Vulgar II is the fourth album by Thighpaulsandra. Like its predecessor, Double Vulgar, it contains sexually explicit, homoerotic artwork, though it is slightly toned down by comparison. One insert contains a double-sided image of model Chris Jones' erection. The album also features lyrics ranging from the heavily graphic, sexually explicit situations of its first volume to the less obvious musings of "The Vile Receipt" ("my nostrils are just perfect".)

== Track listing ==
All tracks are written by Thighpaulsandra.

No.	Title	Length
1.	"The Vile Receipt"	16:32
2.	"Telly for Rex"	16:54
3.	"Imperial"	14:23
4.	"Vomiting Child"	9:36
5.	"Bost sanvay unst bit sumonver"	21:46
Total length:		79:10

== Personnel ==
- Thighpaulsandra – vocals, piano, synthesizer, vocoder, tapes, computers, bells; guitar on "Vomiting Child"
- Martin Schellard – guitars and bass; pedal steel guitar on "Vomiting Child"; violin on "Bost Sanvay…"
- Siôn Orgon – drums; backing vocals on "Telly for Rex", "Vomiting Child" and "Bost Sanvay…"; antique cymbals on "Imperial" and "Vomiting Child"; thunder tube, throat tube and "congregation" on "Imperial"; bass, cornet and shakers on "Bost Sanvay…"; tambourine on "Telly for Rex" and "Bost Sanvay…"
- Dorothy Lewis – vocals on "The Vile Receipt"; "sad clump" on "Telly for Rex"
- Werner Karrase – trumpet on "The Vile Receipt"
- Caspar Brüst – trumpet on The Vile Receipt"
- Marc Black – trombone on "The Vile Receipt"
- Harmony Styles – tenor sax on "The Vile Receipt"
- Chris Jones: Backing vocals on "Telly for Rex" and "Bost Sanvay…"; clocks and "congregation" on "Imperial"; "stalker" on "Vomiting Child"
- Tania Walker – backing vocals on "Telly for Rex" and "Vomiting Child"
- Jody Evans – "sad clump" on "Telly for Rex"
- Rob Greensmith – "sad clump" on "Telly for Rex"; "congregation" on "Imperial"; clarinet on "Bost Sanvay…"
- Tom Edwards – Marimba and vibraphone on "Imperial" and "Bost Sanvay…"; shakers and tambourine on "Imperial"
- The Maureen Wilson Octet – Strings on "Imperial"
- Marc Johnson – "congregation" on "Imperial"
- Gaz Williams – bass on "Bost Sanvay…"
- Paddy Farr – backing vocals on "Bost Sanvay…"
- June Carroll – backing vocals on "Bost Sanvay…"
- Edward Carroll – backing vocals on "Bost Sanvay…"
