= The Golden Communion =

Studio album by Thighpaulsandra
- Released: 4 September 2015
- Recorded: Aerial Studios; Golliwog Farm, Wales; North Tower; Rockfield Studios, 2005-2015
- Genre: Industrial, experimental music, psychedelic rock, progressive rock
- Length: 116:54
- Label: Editions Mego; EMEGO 207
- Producer: Thighpaulsandra

Thighpaulsandra chronology
The Clisto E.P. (2007)	The Golden Communion (2015)

The Golden Communion is the sixth album by Thighpaulsandra, released on 4 September 2015. It marks Thighpaulsandra's return to solo work after nearly a decade of touring with Spiritualized, Elizabeth Fraser and Wire. The album pulls from over ten years of recording sessions; as such, The Golden Communion boasts collaborations not only with Thighpaulsandra regulars Martin Schellard and Siôn Orgon, but also with John Balance and Peter Christopherson, the late founders of industrial band Coil. Overall, the music presented contains threads of psychedelic and progressive rock, featuring orchestrations and extended pop music song structures not heard before on a Thighpaulsandra album.

The Golden Communion was released physically in 2CD and 3LP formats, as well as digitally in 24-bit FLAC.

== Track listing ==
All tracks are written by Thighpaulsandra, unless otherwise noted.

Disc one
No.	Title	Music	Length
1.	"Salute"		8:44
2.	"Did He Fall?"	Thighpaulsandra, John Balance	6:31
3.	"The Foot Garden"		9:55
4.	"A Devil in Every Hedgerow"		4:38
5.	"The Golden Communion"		25:56
Total length:			55:41

Disc two
No.	Title	Music	Length
1.	"Misery"		10:58
2.	"Valerie"		8:16
3.	"The Sinking Stone"		11:08
4.	"On the Register"		4:05
5.	"The More I Know Men, the Better I Like Dogs"	Thighpaulsandra, Balance, Martin Schellard, Siôn Orgon	26:48
Total length:			61:13

== Personnel ==
- Thighpaulsandra – vocals, piano, harpsichord, synthesizers, electric piano, organ; percussion on "A Devil in Every Hedgerow" and "The More I Know Men…"; bass, cittern and autoharp on "Valerie"
- Martin Schellard – guitars; bass on "Salute", "The Golden Communion", "Misery" and "The Sinking Stone"; cittern on "The Foot Garden"; electronics on "A Devil in Every Hedgerow"; slide guitar on "Valerie"
- Siôn Orgon – drums; vocals on "Did He Fall?", "The Foot Garden, "The Golden Communion", "Misery", "The Sinking Stone", "On the Register"; AudioMulch on "Did He Fall?" and "The More I Know Men…"; photography
- John Balance – vocals and effects on "Did He Fall?" and "The More I Know Men…"; singing bowls and ARP 2600 on "The More I Know Men…"
- Peter Christopherson – "rhythmic interference" on "Did He Fall?"
- Dirk Campbell – duduk on "The Foot Garden"
- Liam Thomas – Steim Cracklebox on "The Foot Garden"
- The Maureen Wilson Quartet – strings on "The Golden Communion"
- Helen Bishop – clarinet on "Misery"
- Steve Cole – bass on "On the Register"
- Dan Greensmith – vocals on "Valerie"
- Rob Greensmith – vocals on "Valerie"; engineering
- Joanna Swan – vocals on "Did He Fall?", "The Foot Garden", "Misery" and "Valerie"
- Lara Ward – vocals on "Did He Fall?"; choreography
- Nick Pullin – vocals on "Did He Fall?", "Misery" and "Valerie"
- George McCarthy – vocals on "A Devil in Every Hedgerow"
- Pan, Moon and Fox (dogs) – "dog stuff" on "The More I Know Men…"
- Rashad Becker – mastering
