= Mont Campbell =

British musician (born 1950)

Dirk Campbell
- Also known as: Mont Campbell
- Born: Hugo Martin Montgomery Campbell; 30 December 1950 (age 75); Ismaïlia, Egypt
- Origin: England
- Genres: World music; progressive rock; theatre music; psychedelic rock; film music
- Occupations: Musician, composer, sustainable energy company executive
- Instruments: various wind instruments (French horn; reeds; flutes; horns; whistles; bagpipes); harps; lutes; bass guitar; keyboards; guitar; sampler; vocals; programming
- Years active: 1968–present
- Labels: Deram; Virgin Records; Voiceprint; East Side Digital; Hermes Records; Evolution
- Website: Dirk Campbell BandCamp

Dirk Campbell (born Hugo Martin Montgomery Campbell, 30 December 1950), previously known as Mont Campbell, is a British composer, multi-instrumentalist, and company executive. Campbell is best known for his work with progressive rock bands such as Egg and National Health, though he would later "forswear the genre of rock music altogether, and would begin to develop an interest in folk tradition and, increasingly, non-western music."

Cambell began a full-time career as composer in 1989 with film and commercials commissions from Redwing Films and now lectures on music in remote antiquity, and ways of incorporating non-western music into contemporary composition. He is a director of Ovesco, a Sussex-based alternative energy company.

In December 2024 Campbell put his music up for sale on BandCamp.

== Biography ==
=== Early years ===
Campbell was born in a British military hospital in Ismaïlia, Egypt to parents Mary Elizabeth "Jackie" Shaw and Lieutenant Colonel Hugo Archibald Leslie Montgomery Campbell "Archie" (1910-1974) of the Royal Tank Regiment. Campbell was named after his grandfather, the composer Martin Shaw. The family moved to Kenya in 1951, where they lived until his mother and sister’s return to the UK in 1962, his father in 1963.

In 1966, Campbell attended the City of London Boys School. While there, he met aspiring keyboard player Dave Stewart and budding guitarist Steve Hillage. The pair recruited Campbell into their band, and Campbell switch his focus from guitar to bass guitar.

=== Rock musician (1968–1976) ===
In early 1968, Campbell, Stewart and Hillage formed the short-lived psychedelic blues band Uriel with drummer Clive Brooks. Following Hillage's departure in mid-1968, the remaining trio took on a progressive rock direction and changed the band name to Egg. They group would briefly reunite with Hillage to record an album under the project name of Arzachel; each member employed an arcane surname both for fun and to get around contractual problems.

Egg released its self-titled debut album in 1970, and The Polite Force the following year. Campbell played bass guitar in the group (as well as singing and adding French horn) and was also its main composer, citing Igor Stravinsky as his main influence. He has, however, expressed reservations about his later time with the band, saying of The Polite Force, "I didn't enjoy the sessions which seemed to me turgid and unsatisfying. I don't like the album." All Egg members also played and composed for the Ottawa Music Co., a large ensemble co-led by Dave Stewart and Chris Cutler between 1971 and 1972, which brought together members of Egg, Henry Cow and Khan, along with other composers and instrumentalists. Cutler recalls the ensemble playing Campbell's "Study for Four Keyboards", "Enneagram", and "Three Pieces for Wind Quartet" (and also that Campbell, during the last OMC show, "(swung) across the stage on a rope shouting 'It's a mug's game'.")

Persistently struggling to maintain their record deal with Deram, Egg amicably disbanded in 1972. By this time Campbell had become interested in mysticism and was involved in the international spiritual movement Subud. Having unsuccessfully pursued work as a plumber and as a graphic designer, he was invited to compose music for a film by director David Anderson: this in turn led to him attending the Royal College of Music, studying the French horn and composition and gaining his ARCM diploma in 1974. With mixed feelings about his academic studies, he reunited with his former Egg bandmates for their final album The Civil Surface (also in 1974), which consisted of unreleased material written in 1971–72, including what many view as Campbell's masterpiece in the progressive rock canon, Enneagram. The album was bolstered by two Campbell-composed wind quartets (which featured neither Stewart nor Brooks).

During this period, Campbell maintained a connection with the Canterbury scene movement of which Egg had been a part, playing and recording as a support musician for Henry Cow, Hatfield & The North, Slapp Happy and others. Following graduation (and after a very brief stint with Alan Gowen's jazz fusion band Gilgamesh), Campbell linked up with Stewart again in 1975, this time as part of the original line-up of National Health. Although Campbell initially enjoyed his work with the band (for which he composed several pieces including "Paracelsus", "Agrippa", "Zabaglione" and "Starlight on Seaweed"), within a year he became disheartened by its lack of success. He left the band in June 1976 after a UK tour, a radio session for the BBC and a "disastrous" performance at a one-off French festival (the latter being his final appearance with the group). Although National Health secured a recording contract following his departure, Campbell's compositions would be dropped from the set: recordings of them would not surface until twenty years later on the archive collection "Missing Pieces".

=== World musician (1977–present) ===
Campbell's final gig with National Health resulted in a total discouragement with rock music, and in subsequent years he would abandon the genre altogether, describing it as having "very limited powers of expression... a rather fixed, limited stratum of musical experience, and one that I no longer feel particularly drawn to." In 1977, he dropped his old school nickname of "Mont" in favour of "Dirk" and formed the two-guitar, flute and violin quartet Mozaic, which mostly played "pleasant, undemanding" Campbell pieces at weddings and social events. He also recorded an (ultimately unreleased) tape of other compositions, called Individual Extracts.

In 1983, Campbell developed an overwhelming interest in world music and spent most of the next decade-and-a-half mastering a wide variety of wind instruments, harps and lutes from diverse cultures around the world. This led to an ongoing career as a specialist session musician and composer for films, theatre and television, including work with the Royal Shakespeare Company and contributions to The Last King of Scotland, Long Walk to Freedom, Harry Potter and the Goblet of Fire, State of Play, the 2008 revival of Survivors and the 2017 film of The Mummy. He has enjoyed a run of cinema collaborations with his 1970s creative partner David Anderson, including Dreamland Express, In the Time of Angels and Deutsche Post.

Campbell released his first solo album, Music from a Round Tower in 1996 (a mixture of authentic traditional instrumentation with MIDI, sampling and sequencing, plus contributions from Dave Stewart). Despite declaring in 2004 that he "personally (had) nothing to say in the western musical language" Campbell followed it up in 2009 with Music from a Walled Garden. He has gone on to record as half of The World Wind Band (the other half being fellow multi-wind player Jan Hendrickse) and currently plays and composes as part of the "non-European folk" band Kalamus, which he has described as "mostly flute and bagpipe music with percussion" and which released their first album Bronze in 2011.

In January 2009 Campbell appeared on British television in the BBC documentary Prog Rock Britannia: An Observation in Three Movements, reminiscing about Egg and the progressive rock movement in general.

=== Activist ===
Campbell is a member of Extinction Rebellion and protested against fascism at the National Conservatism Conference.

== Multi-instrumental abilities ==
Campbell is a diverse multi-instrumentalist. During his time as a rock musician he predominantly played electric bass guitar, six-string electric guitar and electric piano, but has mostly abandoned these instruments since his retirement from rock music. He is an occasional singer and, on his solo albums, has worked with digital age music technology (sampling, programming and MIDI).

Since Campbells's reinvention as a world music and historical musical specialist, he has focused predominantly on acoustic instrumentation and plays around forty different instruments, including:

- horns (French horn, ancient Roman cornu, animal horns, "primitive trumpets")
- side-blown/transverse flutes (Western concert flute, Irish flute, Indian bansuri, Fula tambin)
- end-blown flutes (Southeast Asian suling, Persian ney, Balkan/Turkish kaval
- ducted/fipple flutes (tin whistle, Slovakian fujara, Kenyan filimbi, Native American flute)
- single reed woodwind instruments (clarinet, Egyptian/Palestinian arghul, Arabic mijwiz)
- double reed woodwind instruments (Turkish/Balkan zurna, Armenian duduk, European shawm, Indian shehnai)
- bagpipes (Great Highland bagpipe, Irish uilleann pipes, French cornemuse, Balkan gaida, Hungarian dudy, Italian zampogna, North African mezoued, medieval/early English bagpipes)
- harps (West African kora, Gaelic clàrsach)
- assorted lutes
- east African nyatiti lyre
- unspecified percussion

== Work in energy provision ==
Campbell also pursues parallel work as an environmentalist and alternative energy specialist. He is a founding director of the Ouse Valley Energy Services Company (Ovesco), which began its work by initiating a solar power station in Campbell's current hometown of Lewes and has since expanded to cover further sustainable energy projects in the Ouse Valley region.

== Family life ==
His partner Adrienne died in 2012. Campbell has one son and six daughters, one of whom, Anna Campbell, was killed in 2018 fighting for the Kurdish Women's Protection Units in Syria.

== Discography ==
=== Solo ===
- Music from a Round Tower (Resurgence RES-120-CD, 1996) UK; (East Side Digital ESD 81212, 1997) US
- Music from a Walled Garden (MFA-02, 2009 – dist. Burning Shed) Worldwide
- Long Time Gone (2025, private issue, dist. aMarxe on BandCamp) Worldwide

=== With the World Wind Band (Dirk Campbell and Jan Hendrickse) ===
- Safar (Hermes Records HER029, 2006)

=== With Uriel/Arzachel ===
- Arzachel (Evolution, 1969)
- Arzachel Collectors Edition (Egg Archive CD69-7201, November 2007 – dist. Burning Shed)

=== With Egg ===
- Egg (Deram POCD-1843, March 1970)
- The Polite Force (Deram POCD-1844, February 1971)
- The Civil Surface (Virgin VJD-5026, December 1974)
- The Metronomical Society (Egg Archive CD69-7202, November 2007 – dist. Burning Shed)

=== With National Health ===
- National Health Complete (East Side Digital ESD 80402/412, 1990)
- Missing Pieces (East Side Digital ESD 81172, 1996)

=== Appears on (partial list) ===
- Slapp Happy / Henry Cow - Desperate Straights (Virgin, 1974) [French horn]
- Hatfield and the North - The Rotters' Club (Virgin, 1975) [French horn]
- Memories of Ireland (Medarcy ECD 3113, 1995)
- Relaxing Spa (Killer Tracks, 1995)
- Textures/Landscapes/Travel (library music, Carlin Production Music 206, 1995 with Rick Fenn)
- National Flavours 5: Balkan/Gaelic/Middle East/Africa (library music, Carlin Production Music 220, 1995 with Rick Fenn)
- Ethnic (library music, Zone 002, 1995)
- Desire (library music, Zone Music 012, 1995)
- Thrill Seekers (library music, Zone Music 014, 1995)
- Fun Fun Fun (library music, Zone Music 015, 1995)
- People's Stories (library music, Zone Music 021, 1995)
- Earth Matters (library music, Zone Music 023, 1995)
- Prehistory and Early Man (library music, Zone Music 034, 1995)
- Early Medieval (library music, Zone Music 036, 1995)
- Audio Allsorts 1 (library music, Zone Plus 500, 1995)
- Africa United (library music, Zone Plus 506, 1995)
- Funtastic 1 (library music, Zone Plus 558, 1995)
- Russia Uncovered (library music, Zone Plus 616, 1995)
- World Atmosphere (library music, Music House MHA-23, 1995)
- World Sport (library music, Music House MHE-43, 1995)
- World Journeys (library music, Bruton BR-0219, 1996)
- Kazaam (soundtrack) (Perspective Records 549 027-2, 1996)
- India (library music, Music House MHS-32, 1997)
- Bayete and Jabu Khanyile - Africa Unite (Mango CIDM 1119/512 173-2, 1997)
- Eastern European Journeys (library music, Bruton BRR59, 1998)
- Sheila Walsh (author/singer) - Hope (Women of Faith, Integrity Music 14072, 1998)
- Spirit of Ireland (Versailles Records 493031, 1999 - tracks from Ireland)
- Continuo - Meditations on Pachelbel's Canon (Six Degrees Records 657036 3003-2, 1999)
- Euphoria (Canadian band) - Euphoria (Six Degrees Records 657036 1015-2, 1999)
- Celtic World, Vol.1 & 2 (Laserlight (label) 24343, 1999)
- Celtic Tranquility (Laserlight (label)21513, 1999)
- Celtic Dream (Delta Distribution 21510, 1999)
- Mystic Ireland (Delta Distribution 13303, 1999 - two tracks from Ireland)
- Meditation (library music, Chappelle AV CHAPAV158, 2000)
- State of Grace: The Music of Paul Schwartz (Windham Hill 01934115652, 2000)
- Beautiful People (film) (soundtrack) (Varèse Sarabande 80812, 2000)
- Bob Holroyd - A Different Space (Six Degrees Records 657036 1030-2, 2000)
- War Images (library music, Bruton BR-0361, 2001)
- Gordon Giltrap - Troubador (K-Tel ECD 3390, 2001)
- Euphoria (Canadian band) - Beautiful My Child (Six Degrees Records 657036 1045-2, 2001)
- Zoo Collection: Celtic Moments (Sony Music Distribution 986213, 2002)
- Lulu (singer) - Together (Lulu album) (Mercury 04400630802, 2002)
- Mystic Earth (Time Music 133, 2002)
- Russell Watson - Encore (Russell Watson album) (Decca 12688, 2002)
- Celtic: Golden Greats (Disky MP 905166, 2002)
- Early History (library music, Bruton BR-0404-2, 2003)
- Celtic Spirit - Celtic & World Music (Laserlight (label) 36 172, 2003 - track from Ireland)
- World Flavours: Impressions of Ireland (Disky OR 644372, 2003)
- Middle Eastern Journeys (library music, Bruton BR-0428, 2004)
- Yoshida Brothers - Yoshida Brothers II (Domo 73032, 2004)
- Laws of Attraction (soundtrack) (La-La Land Records 1019, 2004)
- John Tavener - The Veil of the Temple (RCA Red Seal 66154, 2005)
- The Last King of Scotland (film) (soundtrack) (Rounder 9071, 2006)
- Gordon Giltrap - Troubador/Live at the Ventnor Winter Gardens (CD+DVD, Edsel EDSX 3007, 2008)
- Faryl Smith - Wonderland (Faryl Smith album) (Decca 2722167, 2009)
- Classic Love/The Ultimate Ballads Album (Decca 001246802, 2009)
- Mediterranean & Near East (library music, Amphonic Music AVF-125, 2010)
- Ireland (library music, Amphonic Music, 2010)
- Kalamus - Bronze (private issue, 2011)
- The First Grader (soundtrack) (Varèse Sarabande 3020670992, 2011)
- Paul Schwartz - State of Grace (Valley Entertainment/Windham Hill Records VWH 210172, re-issued 2011)
- Nightwish - Imaginaerum (Nuclear Blast NB 29930, 2011)
- Salmon Fishing in the Yemen (soundtrack) (Lakeshore Records LKS 342562, 2012)
- Celtic Lands (library music, SOHO Music, 2013)
- (Never Work With) Kids & Animals (library music, Boost TV 011, 2014)
- Salaam Dubai: Oriental Music from tradition to modernity (Melmax Music, 2014 - track from Safar)
- Thighpaulsandra - The Golden Communion (Editions Mego EMEGO 207CD, 2015, duduk on "The Foot Garden")
- Indian Summers (television soundtrack) (Silva Screen SILCD 1488, 2015)
- Fragile Earth (library music, Production Music Online PMOL-011, 2018)
- Christmas 1 (library music, Production Music Online PMOL-019, 2018)
- World Traveller - Africa (library music, Production Music Online PMOL-036, 2018)
- World Traveller - India (library music, Production Music Online PMOL-037, 2018)
- World Traveller - Celtic Journey (library music, Production Music Online PMOL-038, 2018)
- World Traveller - Near & Middle East (library music, Production Music Online PMOL-040, 2018)
- World Traveller - China, Indonesia & Japan (library music, Production Music Online PMOL-042, 2018)
- The Ancient World (library music, Production Music Online PMOL-048, 2018)
- World Mystery and Wonder (library music, Production Music Online PMOL-062, 2018)
- The Medieval Era (library music, Production Music Online PMOL-079, 2018)
- World Adventure (library music, Production Music Online PMOL-091, 2018)
- Destination Asia (library music, Production Music Online PMOL-098, 2018)
- 100 Greatest Promos (library music, Production Music Online PMOL-100, 2018)
- World Percussion (library music, Production Music Online PMOL-110, 2018)
- Tudor & Renaissance (library music, Production Music Online PMOL-122, 2018)
- Middle East & Central Asia (library music, Production Music Online PMOL-148, 2018
- Upbeat World 1 (library music, Production Music Online PMOL-190, 2018)
- Upbeat World 2 (library music, Production Music Online PMOL-191, 2018)
- Japan (library music, Production Music Online PMOL-193, 2018)
- 100 Greatest Promos 2 (library music, Production Music Online PMOL-200, 2018)

== Filmography ==
- 2009: Prog Rock Britannia: An Observation in Three Movements
- 2015: Romantic Warriors III: Canterbury Tales (DVD)

== Sources ==
- Official website
- World Wind Band official site
- Calyx biography
