= The Polite Force =

Studio album by Egg
- Released: February 1971
- Recorded: May 1970
- Studio: Morgan Studios, London
- Genre: Progressive rock
- Length: 42:20
- Label: Deram
- Producer: Neil Slaven

Egg chronology
Egg (1970)	The Polite Force (1971)	The Civil Surface (1974)

Professional ratings
Review scores
Source	Rating
Allmusic	3/5 stars
Classic Rock	2/5 stars

The Polite Force is the second album by British band Egg, released in February 1971.

== Music ==
The Polite Force employs lengthy song forms, and incorporates "serious classical influences," according to Bruce Eder of AllMusic. The sound has drawn comparisons to Emerson, Lake and Palmer. According to Eder: "Dave Stewart's organ playing is as aggressive and melodic as Keith Emerson's, and he accomplishes a lot with less in the way of high-speed histrionics." According to Classic Rock Magazine: "How the hell do you explain Egg? Ludicrous, verging on pompous, as much as these Brits tried to avoid accusations of musical arrogance they were guilty as charged."

== Legacy ==
Bruce Eder of AllMusic wrote: "The album is diverting enough in its successful spots to carry the rest of it, but there are some missteps -- including one track dominated by guest horn players -- that were enough to keep this album from being a favorite, even among art-rock fanatics." Classic Rock called the album "a glorious example of being up your own arse."

== Track listing ==
Side One
No.	Title	Writer(s)	Length
1.	"A Visit to Newport Hospital"	Mont Campbell, Dave Stewart	8:19
2.	"Contrasong"	Campbell	4:19
3.	"Boilk"	Stewart	9:15

Side Two
No.	Title	Writer(s)	Length
1.	"Long Piece No. 3 — Part 1"	Campbell	5:07
2.	"Long Piece No. 3 — Part 2"	Campbell	7:37
3.	"Long Piece No. 3 — Part 3"	Campbell	5:02
4.	"Long Piece No. 3 — Part 4"	Campbell	2:51

The tracks all appear separately with spaces in between them on both the long playing record and the Compact Disc. On the original long playing record from Deram, "Long Piece No. 3" is listed with the four parts. A time of 20:42 is given as the overall length of the piece, with separate incremental lengths of time given for each of the parts. The reference to the side number and tracks therein is the same as the vinyl album. In turn, the compact disc has 7 tracks.

== Personnel ==
- Dave Stewart – organ, piano, tone generator, Mellotron
- Mont Campbell – bass, vocals (1, 2); piano and organ on "Long Piece No. 3 - Part 1"; French horn on "Long Piece No. 3 - Part 2"
- Clive Brooks – drums

=== Guests ===
- Henry Lowther – trumpet on "Contrasong"
- Mike Davis – trumpet on "Contrasong"
- Bob Downes – tenor saxophone on "Contrasong"
- Tony Roberts – tenor saxophone on "Contrasong"
