= Brain Donor =

- Origin: England
- Genres: Hard rock; garage rock; psychedelic rock
- Years active: 1999–2009
- Labels: Impresario; Brain Donor; Invada
- Past members: Julian Cope; Anthony 'Doggen' Foster; Kevin 'Kevlar' Bales; Ian 'Mister E' Bissett

Brain Donor were an English power trio, formed in July 1999 by Julian Cope and two Spiritualized members, Doggen Foster (lead guitar) and drummer Kevin 'Kevlar' Bales. Wearing full make-up in the kabuki style of early KISS, the band sought to combine Van Halen-esque heavy metal with garage rock in the style of Blue Cheer and the Japanese noise rock bands High Rise and Mainliner.

The band's debut album Love Peace & Fuck was hammered by the press for its gratuitous soloing and guitar heavy production. But with the recent return of heavy metal values to underground music via re-appraissals of Blue Cheer and Sir Lord Baltimore, Love Peace & Fuck has since come to be regarded by the new American Underground as something of a classic,} and a US compilation album of the band was released in 2005, on San Francisco's Mister E. Records. The same year, a song entitled "Messages" from the second Brain Donor album, Too Freud To Rock 'n' Roll, Too Jung To Die, appeared in the American film, The Lost.

Bales was replaced by new drummer, known as Mr. E, for the band's last two albums. Brain Donor has been inactive since 2009's Wasted Fuzz Excessive.

== Discography ==
=== Studio albums ===
- Love Peace & Fuck (Impresario, 2001)
- Too Freud to Rock 'n' Roll, Too Jung to Die (Brain Donor Records, 2003) (2-CD set; CD 1 features studio material from 1999 to 2002, CD 2 contains a 2000 live recording)
- Drain'd Boner (Invada, 2006)
- Wasted Fuzz Excessive (Brain Donor Records, 2009)

=== Live albums ===
- Thekla (White Trash Recordings, 2007)

=== Compilation albums ===
- Brain Donor (Mister E, 2005) (US compilation)

=== Singles ===
- "She Saw Me Coming" (Impresario, 2001)
- "Get Off Your Pretty Face" (Impresario, 2001)
- "My Pagan Ass" (Static Caravan / Resonant, 2002)
