= Queen Elizabeth (band) =

British band

Queen Elizabeth are a British band. It is a collaborative experimental project between Thighpaulsandra and Julian Cope. The general concept behind Queen Elizabeth was a "sonic ritual" in which sounds, melodies and other sonic properties would combine. Both releases, 1994's Queen Elizabeth and 1997's double-disc Queen Elizabeth 2: Elizabeth Vagina, consist mostly of half-hour-long tracks which contrast experimental ambient music with short bursts of Krautrock. The three discs (and seven tracks) are the band's only studio output, yet "Beneath the Frozen Lake of Stars", which appeared on Thighpaulsandra's I, Thighpaulsandra, was a revamped version of a track destined for a third Queen Elizabeth release. Cope has said that Thighpaulsandra's version went above and beyond the original recording they made together.

Queen Elizabeth 2: Elizabeth Vagina received a three-star rating from AllMusic.

In 2009, a recording of the band's only live performance in May 2000 was released as an mp3 download entitled "Hall" through Cope's official website.

== Discography ==
- Queen Elizabeth – (1994)
- Queen Elizabeth 2: Elizabeth Vagina – (1997)
- Hall – (2009)
- The Corpse Of Queen Elizabeth - (2024)
