= Some Head =

Some Head EP

EP by Thighpaulsandra
- Released: 1 March 2000
- Genre: Industrial
- Length: 30:03
- Label: Eskaton; ESKATON 021

Thighpaulsandra chronology
Some Head EP (2000)	I, Thighpaulsandra (2001)

Some Head is the first release by Thighpaulsandra. The CD was released via Coil's label Eskaton. The EP was limited to 1000 copies and was packaged in a black clamshell case.

== Track listing ==
All tracks are written by Thighpaulsandra

No.	Title	Length
1.	"Black Nurse"	16:23
2.	"Tudor Fruits"	13:40
Total length:		30:03

== Personnel ==
- Thighpaulsandra: synthesizers, piano, horn, vocals
- John Balance: vocals, text
- Hans-Jürgen Raüsch: "enforcement, retractors"
