= Odin (Julian Cope album) =

Studio album by Julian Cope
- Released: 1999
- Genre: Ambient
- Length: 73:45
- Label: Head Heritage
- Producer: Thighpaulsandra

Julian Cope chronology
Rite² (1997)	Odin (1999)	An Audience With the Cope 2000/2001 (2000)

Professional ratings
Review scores
Source	Rating
Encyclopedia of Popular Music	3/5 stars
The Great Rock Discography	6/10

Odin is an ambient music album by Julian Cope, released in 1999. It is Cope's third album of ambient music and his fifteenth solo album overall.

The album is a 73-minute-long vocal drone piece interwoven with Mellotron and is referred to by Cope as “a simultaneously-synthesized parallel-harmonic Breathing Meditation.” It was recorded in one take, as Cope explained, "The preparation of the studio took six hours, but the performance was entirely live like a concert and without overdubs."

== Track listing ==
All tracks are written by Julian Cope

No.	Title	Length
1.	"Breath Of Odin"	73:45

== Personnel ==
- Julian Cope – vocals, mellotron, keyboards
- Thighpaulsandra – producer, recorded by (credited as Cliff Cheerio)
- Lisa Bennett – artwork, design
