= 20 Mothers =

Studio album by Julian Cope
- Released: 28 August 1995
- Genre: Indie rock, folk, electropop
- Length: 71:34
- Label: Echo
- Producer: Julian Cope; Ed Stasium

Julian Cope chronology
Autogeddon (1994)	20 Mothers (1995)	Interpreter (1996)

Singles from 20 Mothers
- 1. "Try Try Try" Released: 31 July 1995

Professional ratings
Review scores
Source	Rating
Allmusic	4.5/5 stars
The Great Rock Discography	8/10 stars

20 Mothers is the twelfth solo album by Julian Cope, released in August 1995 by Echo. The album's sub-title is "Better to Light a Candle Than to Curse the Darkness".

It was well received by the critics and reached number 20 on the UK Albums Chart. The album revisits many of Cope's existing lyrical themes along with more personal and reflective material dealing with his own family. Cope described 20 Mothers as an album of "love songs and devotional songs" ranging from "pagan rock 'n' roll through sci-fi pop to bubblegum trance music". The main Cope collaborators on the album include keyboard player and string arranger Thighpaulsandra, drummer Rooster Cosby and guitarist Michael "Moon-Eye" Watts in place of multi-instrumentalist Donald Ross Skinner, who only contributes omnichord on a few tracks. There are also contributions by old associates in the shape of bassist James Eller and producer Ed Stasium. The album was preceded by the single "Try Try Try", which reached number 24 in the UK Singles Chart.

== Themes and musical style ==
In total, 20 Mothers is 71 minutes long, and moves through four "Phases," – "Phase 1" (tracks 1–6), "Phase 2" (tracks 7–11), "Phase 3" (tracks 12–16) and "Phase 4" (tracks 17–20), – not unlike the concept of "Phases" on Cope's albums Peggy Suicide and Jehovahkill. In 2003 Aural Innovations magazine retrospectively called 20 Mothers "the most eclectic and varied album" in Cope's discography and added that it was "a remarkably strong if somewhat unfocussed effort". The music was described as ranging from "spacey psychedelic balladry to gentle folk to flat out rock n’ roll to Euro-electropop." In his review for Allmusic, Ned Raggett wrote that the album has the same "rough but right feeling" as Cope's previous album Autogeddon, with "plenty of detours into tribal psych, feedback madness, even quirky synth-pop."

Lyrically, the album covers a wide variety of topics as opposed to the general concept albums of Cope's previous releases. Cope continues to pursue many of the same themes as he had on his albums since Peggy Suicide: Mother Earth on "I Wandered Lonely as a Cloud", described by Cope as "a pagan love song about screwing the Mother Earth in her divine maiden form"; religion on "1995", which challenges the “ignorance of the standard Judeo-Christian One God way of thinking”; megalithic monuments on "Stone Circles ’n’ You"; and "the automobile defined landscape" in "Adam and Eve Hit the Road". On "Greedhead Detector", with its "'Fuck, fuck, fuck you" chorus, he sets his sights on "the fat cats of private industry", while "Queen/Mother" is for Kurt Cobain and Courtney Love.

The album also includes more personal material: album opener "Wheelbarrow Man", described as "an expression of pure, unmitigated joy", was written after Cope had spoken to his estranged brother for the first time in years. “We haven’t spoken since, mind you,” Cope said at the time in the album's liner notes. “It’s not worth the risk.” "Try Try Try" is about Cope’s mother, who, he laments, “has never seen me play live, never heard my records, didn’t read my book, wouldn’t even eat the jam I made with the plums from the tree in my garden. Where did she go?” On "Senile Get" he talks about his frustrations in dealing with his wife’s Alzheimer's– ridden grandmother. "How 5 years of exhausting debilitating futile cleaning & endless cleaning shit & snot & enema-floo-ids (sic) and taking vile screamed abuse and pummelling & vicious threats, however illness-induced, eventually turns good people bitter", said Cope. "I'm Your Daddy" is for Cope's two young daughters, "Cryingbabiessleeplessnights" for his wife, Dorian and the instrumental "Leli B." is dedicated to his mother-in-law, Helen "Leli" Beslity, "the greatest, wisest, sexiest Ma-in-Law that ever there was". The song is without words, said Cope, "because she'd freakout if I wrote how I really felt about her".

"When I Walk Through the Land of Fear" is a rerecording of "Land of Fear", originally released on the Sunspots EP in 1985.

== Album cover ==
The album cover photograph was taken by Jill Furmanovsky and features 20 actual mothers, all of whom are family and friends of Cope. Some of those pictured are Cope's wife, mother and mother-in-law; wives and girlfriends of Cope collaborators James Eller, Rooster Cosby, Tony "Doggen" Foster and Richard Frost; former Zoo Records cohort Pam Young; and Jayne Casey. On the back, Cope is pictured with his daughters Albany and Avalon.

== Track listing ==
All tracks are written by Julian Cope, except where noted.

Phase one
No.	Title	Length
1.	"Wheelbarrow Man"	3:02
2.	"I Wandered Lonely as a Cloud"	2:35
3.	"Try Try Try"	3:27
4.	"Stone Circles 'n' You"	1:48
5.	"Queen-Mother"	3:30
6.	"I'm Your Daddy"	2:13

Phase two
No.	Title	Length
7.	"Highway to the Sun"	6:14
8.	"1995"	3:47
9.	"By the Light of the Silbury Moon"	2:13
10.	"Adam and Eve Hit the Road"	2:05
11.	"Just like Pooh Bear"	3:41

Phase three
No.	Title	Writer(s)	Length
12.	"Girl-Call"		4:23
13.	"Greedhead Detector"	Cope, Donald Ross Skinner	3:49
14.	"Don't Take Roots"		2:13
15.	"Senile Get"		3:37
16.	"The Lonely Guy"		4:42

Phase four
No.	Title	Length
17.	"Cryingbabiessleeplessnights"	3:35
18.	"Leli B"	3:14
19.	"Road of Dreams"	6:05
20.	"When I Walk through the Land of Fear"	5:26

== Poetic notes ==
The album includes a booklet with descriptions of the music and a number of poems:

1. "Never mind the Bollocks, Here's the Clerics"
2. "Glow in the Dark Earth"
3. "Seer/Sucker"
4. "Strong as the Goddess risin'"
5. "The Earth Is the Pearl of the Universe"
6. "Cateclysms"
7. "The Pope is the Wholly Ass of God"
8. "One day the gods came calling"
9. "The Big Syringe"
10. "Post-Feminist Cocksucker"
11. "Show Me a Snorer & I'll Show You an Explorer"

== Charts ==
Chart (1995)	Peak position
Australian Albums (ARIA)	178
UK Albums Chart	20

== Personnel ==
- Julian Cope – vocals, guitar, bass, mellotron, production
- Mark "Rooster" Cosby – drums, percussion
- Michael "Moon Eye" Watts – guitar
- Thighpaulsandra – synthesizer, piano, string arrangements, recording, mix
- Dorian Cope (credited as "Mavis Grind") – second lead vocals on "Road of Dreams"
- Donald Ross Skinner – omnichord on "The Lonely Guy" & "Senile Get"
- Terry Edwards – saxophones on "Wheelbarrow Man", trumpet on "Road of Dreams", horn arrangements
- Danny Thompson – double bass on "1995"
- James Eller – bass, moog on "Try, Try, Try"
- Steve Ferrera – drums, bongos on "Try, Try, Try"
- Ed Stasium – 12-string guitar, additional production, mix on "Try, Try, Try"
- Martin Schellard – conductor on "I Wandered Lonely as a Cloud"

Technical

- Shaun Harvey – additional recording on "Cryingbabiessleeplessnights" & "Girl-Call"
- Jill Furmanovsky – sleeve photography
- Bruce and Mark @ Design by Green Ink – design
