= Egg (album) =

Studio album by Egg
- Released: 13 March 1970
- Recorded: October 1969
- Studios: Lansdowne Studios, Trident Studios London
- Genres: Progressive rock, experimental rock
- Length: 40:30; 43:40 (first pressing and 2024 reissue)
- Label: Deram
- Producer: Egg

Egg chronology
Egg (1970)	The Polite Force (1971)

Professional ratings
Review scores
Source	Rating
AllMusic	4/5 stars
Classic Rock	2/5 stars

Egg is the 1970 debut album by British progressive rock band Egg.

== Track listing ==
The album was originally released on LP by Deram.

All songs by Clive Brooks, Mont Campbell and Dave Stewart, except where noted.

=== Side one ===
1. "Bulb" (Peter Gallen) – 0:09
2. "While Growing My Hair" – 3:53
3. "I Will Be Absorbed" – 5:10
4. "Fugue in D Minor" (Johann Sebastian Bach) – 2:46
5. "They Laughed When I Sat Down at the Piano…" – 1:17
6. "The Song of McGillicudie the Pusillanimous (Or Don't Worry James, Your Socks Are Hanging in the Coal Cellar with Thomas)" – 5:07
7. "Boilk" – 1:00

=== Side two ===
1. "Symphony No. 2" – 20:43
  - Movement 1
  - Movement 2
  - Blane
  - Movement 4

=== 2004 re-issue ===
The album was re-issued on CD in February 2004 by Eclectic Discs. Remastered from the original tapes, the re-issue has three bonus tracks, including both sides of the band's first and only single ("Seven Is a Jolly Good Time/You Are All Princes") and "Movement 3" from "Symphony No. 2", which was omitted from the original LP days after release due to copyright difficulties, because its tune bears a similarity to part of Igor Stravinsky's ballet The Rite of Spring. There are also similarities to the final Neptune movement of Gustav Holst's orchestral suite The Planets.

The track listing is as follows:

1. "Bulb" – 0:09
2. "While Growing My Hair" – 4:02
3. "I Will Be Absorbed" – 5:11
4. "Fugue in D Minor" – 2:49
5. "They Laughed When I Sat Down at the Piano…" – 1:21
6. "The Song of McGillicudie the Pusillanimous (or don't worry James, your socks are hanging in the coal cellar with Thomas)" – 5:07
7. "Boilk" – 1:04
8. "Symphony No. 2" – 23:54
  - Movement 1 – 5:47
  - Movement 2 – 6:18
  - Blane – 5:28
  - Movement 3 – 3:11 *
  - Movement 4 – 3:10
9. "Seven Is a Jolly Good Time" – 2:47 *
10. "You Are All Princes" – 3:45 *

In late 2024, the album was reissued on vinyl by Esoteric Recordings (the successor to Eclectic Discs), with "Movement 3" restored to the tracklisting for the first time in 55 years.

== Personnel ==
- Dave Stewart - Hammond organ, piano, tone generator, Mellotron
- Mont Campbell - bass, vocals (2, 3, 6)
- Clive Brooks - drums
