= The Clisto E.P. =

EP by Thighpaulsandra
- Released: 2007
- Recorded: Golliwog Farm
- Genre: Experimental
- Length: 20:53
- Label: Klanggalerie

Thighpaulsandra chronology
The Lepore Extrusion (2006)	The Clisto E.P. (2007)	The Golden Communion (2015)

The Clisto E.P. is the fourth EP by Thighpaulsandra released in 2007. The extended play dips into hard rock and noise rock across its four songs. It would be Thighpaulsandra's final release before an eight-year hiatus.

== Track listing ==
All tracks are written by Thighpaulsandra

No.	Title	Length
1.	"Clisto"	4:28
2.	"The Woman from the Hospital"	5:13
3.	"Margaret"	6:14
4.	"Am Smear Challenger"	4:58
Total length:		20:53

== Credits ==
- Thighpaulsandra – synthesizers, vocals, autoharp, computer, farfisa organ
- Siôn Orgon – vocals, percussion, drums, computer, twelve-string guitar, ARP 2600 synthesizer
- Martin Schellard – electric guitar, bass
- Chris Jones – vocals (on "Margaret")
- Francis Naughton – backing vocals, guitar and Roland V-Synth (on "Margaret")
