= Egg (band) =

English rock band

- Origin: London, England
- Genres: Progressive rock, experimental rock
- Years active: 1968–1972, 1974
- Labels: Deram, Caroline
- Spinoff of: Uriel
- Past members: Dave Stewart; Mont Campbell; Clive Brooks

Egg were an English progressive rock band formed in London in July 1968. Remembered for their strange, experimental sound, the band produced three albums before disbanding in 1974.

== Career ==
The founder members of Egg were Dave Stewart who played organ, Mont Campbell on bass and vocals, and drummer Clive Brooks. The band was formed of former members of Uriel, the other member of which was guitarist Steve Hillage. After Hillage left Uriel in August 1968, the other three continued as a trio. Having signed a deal with the Middle Earth club's management branch, they were advised to change their name to Egg, allegedly because Uriel "sounded too much like 'urinal'". In mid-1969 the band signed a deal with Decca's 'progressive' music subsidiary Deram and released their debut album in March 1970. While not a commercial success, it was received well enough for the label to finance the recording of a follow-up, but when the time came to release it, the label shelved it until producer Neil Slaven's lobbying finally resulted in The Polite Force coming out in February 1971. Now signed to The Groundhogs' management company, Egg finished the year with an increased touring schedule, but in spite of accumulating enough material for a third album, they were unable to secure another record deal, and split up in July 1972.

In 1974 Stewart, who had signed with Virgin as a member of Hatfield and the North, got a deal for Egg to record their unreleased material, which resulted in the farewell album The Civil Surface. Steve Hillage guested on one piece of the album.

In December 2007, a selection of live recordings from between 1969 and 1972, entitled The Metronomical Society, was released.

== Background and song structure ==
Egg are often regarded as part of the Canterbury scene, a loose movement of progressive and psychedelic musicians, based on Stewart's later membership of Hatfield and the North and National Health, although the band have no geographical connection to Canterbury. Their music can be described as progressive rock with elements of psychedelia and chamber rock (later exemplified by the Rock In Opposition movement). They employed unusual time signatures, as reflected in songs like "Seven Is A Jolly Good Time". They also brought a humorous element to their music. Mont Campbell, the band's main composer, acknowledged the strong influence of Igor Stravinsky, which resulted in multi-part suites such as "Symphony n°2" and "Long Piece n°3".

== Arzachel ==
In mid-1969, to capitalise on the psychedelic rock market, Stewart, Campbell and Brooks contributed to the one-off studio project Arzachel, named after a Moon crater. Also featured in that project was Steve Hillage (on summer holiday from university), who had like the others been a member of the pre-Egg band Uriel. Egg were by that time under contract to Decca, therefore all were credited under pseudonyms.

Also available is a 26,000-word, 60-page companion booklet Copious Notes. Written by Dave Stewart, Mont Campbell and their close friend Antony Vinall, it tells the inside story of Uriel, Egg, Arzachel and the Ottawa Company, from the formation of Uriel in early 1968 to the making of Egg's final album The Civil Surface in 1974. The text includes personal memoirs, anecdotes, short stories, random recollections, social observation, period details, musical analysis and song lyrics, as well as a collection of archive photos taken by Terry Yetton and the musicians.

== Discography ==
=== Albums ===
Year	Album
1970	Egg
1971	The Polite Force
1974	The Civil Surface
1985	Seven Is a Jolly Good Time (compilation)
2007	The Metronomical Society (archival live material)
2015	BBC Sessions And More 1968-1972 (archival live material)

=== Singles ===
- "Seven Is a Jolly Good Time" / "You Are All Princes" (UK 29 August 1969)

== Filmography ==
- 2015: Romantic Warriors III: Canterbury Tales (DVD)

== See also ==
- List of rock instrumentals
