= Try Try Try (Julian Cope song) =

1995 single by Julian Cope

Single by Julian Cope

from the album 20 Mothers
- B-side: "Baby, Let's Play Vet"; "W.E.S.S.E.X.Y"; "Don't Jump Me, Mother"
- Released: 31 July 1995
- Length: 3:28
- Label: Echo
- Songwriter: Julian Cope
- Producer: Julian Cope

Julian Cope singles chronology
"Fear Loves This Place" (1992)	"Try Try Try" (1995)	"I Come from Another Planet, Baby" (1996)

"Try Try Try" is a song by English singer-songwriter Julian Cope. It was the only single released in support of his 12th solo album, 20 Mothers, and reached number 24 on the UK Singles Chart.

== Chart ==
Chart (1995)	Peak position
Australia (ARIA)	167
UK Singles (OCC)	24
US Adult Alternative Airplay (Billboard)	12
