= Stories from Time and Space =

Studio album by Hawkwind
- Released: 5 April 2024
- Genre: Space rock
- Length: 59:49
- Label: Cherry Red
- Producer: Hawkwind

Hawkwind chronology
The Future Never Waits (2023)	Stories from Time and Space (2024)	There Is No Space for Us (2025)

Stories from Time and Space is the 36th studio album by English space rock band Hawkwind, first released on 5 April 2024 by Cherry Red Records.

The band first announced the album's title and release date in November 2023 alongside tour dates. The album was mixed at Abbey Road Studios.

== Reception ==
According to review aggregation site Metacritic, the album received a 79 out of 100 from 6 reviews, indicating "generally favorable reviews".

In a positive review by Louder Than War, the record was noted for its contrast from the previous album, The Future Never Waits, which was stated to be "the group reflecting with wry humour and a touch of sadness on the mis-steps of the human race", while Stories From Time and Space is "a full-bore, epic space-rock voyage that uses intergalactic exploration as a metaphor for the journey through life itself". They described the opening track as a classy, Peter Hammill-esque ballad where frontman Dave Brock "reflects on human mortality". The review also states the track "What Are We Going To Do While We're Here" as a highlight, noting a greater influence from jazz music. Another highlight is "The Tracker", which is described as a "classic hawkwind space-rocker, driven by an almost Beatles-esque descending chord progression". In conclusion, "as Captain Brock states bluntly on the opening song of this hugely enjoyable album, "our lives can't last forever". Whatever the future may bring, Hawkwind look set to remain a dynamic creative force to the end.".

Professional ratings
Aggregate scores
Source	Rating
Metacritic	79/100
Review scores
Source	Rating
Sputnikmusic	4/5 stars
Mojo	4/5 stars
Uncut	8/10
Classic Rock	4/5 stars
AllMusic	3.5/5 stars

== Track listing ==
Stories from Time and Space track listing
No.	Title	Writer(s)	Length
1.	"Our Lives Can't Last Forever"	Dave Brock	5:37
2.	"The Starship (One Love One Life)"	Brock	7:40
3.	"What Are We Going to Do While We're Here"	Brock	7:04
4.	"The Tracker"	Brock	5:00
5.	"Eternal Light"	Magnus Martin	1:40
6.	"Till I Found You"	Brock; Martin	4:51
7.	"Underwater City"	Martin	3:05
8.	"The Night Sky"	Brock	2:28
9.	"Traveler of Time & Space"	Brock	7:27
10.	"Re-generate"	Brock	5:02
11.	"The Black Sea"	Martin	1:11
12.	"Frozen in Time"	Martin	3:25
13.	"Stargazers"	Brock; Martin; Tim Lewis; Richard Chadwick; Doug MacKinnon	5:15
Total length:			59:49

== Personnel ==
Hawkwind

- Dave Brock – vocals, guitar, keyboards, synthesisers, production
- Magnus Martin – guitars, vocals, keyboards, production
- Thighpaulsandra – keyboards, synthesisers, production
- Richard Chadwick – drums, vocals, percussion, production
- Doug MacKinnon – bass, production

Additional contributors

- Michal Sosna - saxophone (track 3)
- Kris Tait – coordination
- Stuart Bladen – artwork
