= The Lepore Extrusion =

EP by Thighpaulsandra
- Released: 17 October 2006
- Genre: Industrial, dark ambient
- Length: 45:12
- Language: English
- Label: Brainwashed Recordings HAND 003
- Producer: Thighpaulsandra

Thighpaulsandra chronology
Chamber Music (2006)	The Lepore Extrusion (2006)	The Clisto E.P. (2007)

The Lepore Extrusion is a 2006 release by Thighpaulsandra. The album was released via Brainwashed Recordings in a limited CD edition of 500 letterpress sleeves, handmade by Michael Babcock of Interrobang Letterpress.

Extrusion is the score to an interactive video installation by New York-based visual artist Daniel McKernan titled Is Evolution Evil?, which featured one of the world's most recognizable transgender women, Amanda Lepore. The exhibit opened in June 2005 in New York City. Included in an enhanced portion of the disc is an essay titled Is Evolution Evil?: Surgical Transformation as the New Punk Aesthetic in the 21st Century (also by McKernan), alongside a schematic and video of the installation.

== Track listing ==
All tracks are written by Thighpaulsandra

No.	Title	Length
1.	"The Lepore Extrusion"	45:12
