= I, Thighpaulsandra =

Studio album by Thighpaulsandra
- Released: 22 January 2001
- Genre: Industrial music
- Length: 136:15 (CD); 109:17 (vinyl)
- Label: Eskaton; ESKATON 026

Thighpaulsandra chronology
Some Head EP (2000)	I, Thighpaulsandra (2001)	The Michel Publicity Window E.P. (2001)

Singles from I, Thighpaulsandra
- 1. "Michel Publicity Window" Released: 6 August 2001

I, Thighpaulsandra is the debut album by Thighpaulsandra. I showcased Thighpaulsandra's interests in krautrock, experimental and industrial music and featured his only single to date, "Michel Publicity Window". Closing song "Beneath the Frozen Lake of Stars" was originally recorded for a third album by Queen Elizabeth, which featured Thighpaulsandra and Julian Cope, but was revised and expanded for inclusion on this album. The vinyl edition was limited to 1000 copies on "moon's milk" white vinyl, with an additional 55 copies on amethyst-coloured vinyl; this smaller batch, along with being autographed, had its sleeve personally damaged by Thighpaulsandra to the extent that the recipient saw fit.

== Track listing ==
=== CD pressing ===
All tracks are written by Thighpaulsandra, unless otherwise noted

Disc one
No.	Title	Music	Length
1.	"Lycraland"	Thighpaulsandra, Martin Schellard	15:35
2.	"The Angelica Declaration"		5:34
3.	"Optical Black"	Thighpaulsandra, John Balance	13:00
4.	"Abuse Foundation IV"		8:37
5.	"Michel Publicity Window"		26:58
Total length:			69:44

Disc two
No.	Title	Music	Length
1.	"Terrible"		9:05
2.	"We, the Descending"		4:52
3.	"Limping Across the Sky"		11:18
4.	"Home Butt Club"	Thighpaulsandra, Schellard	5:39
5.	"Celine and Julie Go Boating"		3:21
6.	"Beneath the Frozen Lake of Stars"	Thighpaulsandra, Julian Cope	32:16
Total length:			66:31

=== LP pressing ===
Side one
No.	Title	Music	Length
1.	"Optical Black"	Thighpaulsandra, John Balance	13:00
2.	"Abuse Foundation IV"		8:37
3.	"Celine and Julie Go Boating"		3:21
Total length:			24:58

Side two
No.	Title	Music	Length
1.	"Lycraland"	Thighpaulsandra, Martin Schellard	15:35
2.	"We, the Descending"		4:52
3.	"The Angelica Declaration"		5:34
Total length:			26:01

Side three
No.	Title	Music	Length
1.	"Home Butt Club"	Thighpaulsandra, Schellard	5:39
2.	"Limping Across the Sky"		11:18
3.	"Terrible"		9:05
Total length:			26:02

Side four
No.	Title	Music	Length
1.	"Beneath the Frozen Lake of Stars"	Thighpaulsandra, Julian Cope	32:16
Total length:			32:16

== Personnel ==
- Thighpaulsandra - vocals, piano, hammond organ, vox organ, mellotron, synthesizer, trumpet, French horn, harpsichord, theremin, CS80, electronics, tapes, filters, ring modulators
- Martin Schellard - guitars; bass on "Optical Black" and "Home Butt Club"
- Malcolm Cross - drums on "The Angelica Declaration", "Michel Publicity Window" and "Home Butt Club"; marimba and antique cymbals on "Abuse Foundation IV"
- Dorothy Lewis - vocal on "Lycraland"
- The Boy Anal: VCS3 on "The Angelica Declaration"; drum loop on "Terrible"
- Ray Dickaty - baritone saxophone on "The Angelica Declaration"
- Dave Temple - alto saxophone on "The Angelica Declaration"; clarinet on "Abuse Foundation IV"
- Siôn Orgon - percussion on "The Angelica Declaration"
- Xeno - backing vocals on "The Angelica Declaration" and "We, the Descending"
- John Balance - vocals on "Optical Black"
- Peter Christopherson - computers on "Optical Black"
- Hans-Jürgen Rausch - Tam tam on "Abuse Foundation IV"; vocals and PPG Wave on "Beneath the Frozen Lake of Stars"
- Butros Müller-Stall - Tam tam on "Abuse Foundation IV"; drums on "We, the Descending", "Celine and Julie Go Boating" and "Beneath the Frozen Lake of Stars"; percussion on "Beneath the Frozen Lake of Stars"
- The Maureen Wilson Quartet - strings on "Abuse Foundation IV"
- Michael Mooney - Gibson lap steel guitar on "Michel Publicity Window"
- Simon Norris - water recording of "Nash Point, South Glam" on "Terrible"
- Rolan Nolan - guitar on "Home Butt Club"
- Julian Cope - Doubleneck guitar on "Beneath the Frozen Lake of Stars"
