= Space Shanty =

Studio album by Khan
- Released: 2 June 1972
- Recorded: December 1971 – March 1972
- Studios: Command Studios, Olympic Studios and Tollington Park Studios, London
- Genres: Progressive rock, Canterbury scene, space rock
- Length: 46:03; 54:02 (Bonus tracks)
- Labels: Deram Records; Polydor Records; Mantra Records; Eclectic Discs Records (re-release)
- Producer: Neil Slaven

Professional ratings
Review scores
Source	Rating
Allmusic	3.5/5 stars
Classic Rock	3/5 stars

Space Shanty is the only album by the short-lived Canterbury scene band Khan. Steve Hillage's first solo album, Fish Rising, included material originally intended for the second album by Khan, but the band split up before it became a possibility.

I suppose in my mind I had some kind of Blade Runnery-like images for some of the songs, although this was 10 years before the Blade Runner movie. But Space Shanty wasn’t a concept album. The various songs had various different themes, interweaved with the quite complex instrumental sections. Actually there was only one lineup change before we recorded the album, with Dick Henningham the keyboard player leaving, and Dave Stewart of Egg coming in at short notice to replace him for the recordings. Dave was brilliant.

— Steve Hillage about the album Space Shanty.

== Track listing ==
All tracks are written by Steve Hillage except where noted.

Side one
No.	Title	Writer(s)	Length
1.	"Space Shanty" (including The Cobalt Sequence and March of the Sine Squadrons)		9:01
2.	"Stranded" (including Effervescent Psycho Novelty No. 5)		6:35
3.	"Mixed Up Man of the Mountains"	Nick Greenwood, Hillage	7:15

Side two
No.	Title	Length
4.	"Driving to Amsterdam"	9:23
5.	"Stargazers"	5:33
6.	"Hollow Stone" (including Escape of the Space Pilots)	8:16

2004 reissue bonus tracks
No.	Title	Writer(s)	Length
7.	"Break the Chains"	Greenwood, Hillage	3:31
8.	"Mixed Up Man of the Mountains" (First version)	Greenwood, Hillage	4:28

== Personnel ==
Band

- Steve Hillage – guitars, vocals
- Nick Greenwood – bass guitar, vocals
- Eric Peachey – drums
- Dave Stewart – organ, piano, celesta, marimbas

Production

- David Anstey – sleeve design
- Pete Booth – engineer
- George Chkiantz – engineer
- Dave Grinstead – remixing
- Neil Slaven – producer
- Derek Varnals – engineer, remixing
