= Interpreter (album) =

Studio album by Julian Cope
- Released: 14 October 1996
- Genre: Rock; pop; space rock; glam pop; psychedelic rock; alternative rock
- Length: 48:20
- Label: Echo
- Producer: Julian Cope

Julian Cope chronology
20 Mothers (1995)	Interpreter (1996)	Rite² (1997)

Singles from Interpreter
- 1. "I Come from Another Planet, Baby" Released: 15 July 1996; 2. "Planetary Sit-In" Released: 23 September 1996

Interpreter is the thirteenth solo studio album, and twentieth album overall by English rock musician Julian Cope, released by Echo Records in October 1996. Particularly inspired by Cope's involvement with the Newbury bypass protest, the record features socially and environmentally-concerned lyrics. The musician worked with numerous guest musicians, including substantial contributions from Thighpaulsandra, resulting in a sprawling album that extends the pop style of 20 Mothers (1995) while incorporating styles of glam pop, space rock, orchestral pop, with string arrangements and electronic overtones. The record is split into two separate parts, "Phase 1" and "Phase 2".

Exemplifying Cope's Neolithic interests, Interpreter was packaged with a fold-out "mythological mind map" depicting sites on the Marlborough Downs, and depicts the Cairnholy standing stones in Scotland on its cover. The album was not a commercial success, reaching number 39 on the UK Albums Chart, becoming his lowest charting album since 1988 and final charting album overall. Nonetheless, the singles "I Come from Another Planet, Baby" and "Planetary Sit-In" made the UK Top 40, and the record received acclaim from music critics. It was Cope's final album before distributing his music independently.

== Background ==
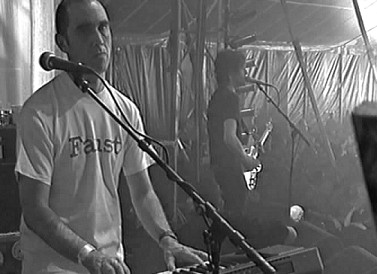
Thighpaulsandra contributes numerous instruments to the album.

Julian Cope's 20th album, Interpreter was largely inspired by the musician's participation in the protests against the construction of the Newbury bypass in Berkshire, which occurred over a three-month period in early 1996 when some 7,000 people demonstrated on the site of where approximately 360 acres (150 ha) of land including 120 acres (49 ha) of woodland were being cleared to make way for the new road. Cope used the album to tackle social and environmental issues. Thighpaulsandra, who had previously collaborated with Cope on Autogeddon and 20 Mothers, returned to help produce, arrange and musically contribute to the new Cope album; his contributions included heavy usage of the ARP and EMS VCS 3 synthesisers, string arrangements, piano, "preened" vocals and the organ solo that concludes "Since I Lost My Head, It's Awl-Right." Cope himself, in addition to vocals, guitar and bass guitar, played Mark II and 400 mark Mellotrons.

Some ten other guests appear on the album, including drummer Rooster Mark Cosby who turns in what critic Ned Raggett described as some of his best work, and "henchman" The Boy Anal, who was unaware his piano playing was being recorded for the end of "Dust". Other contributors included saxophonist and trumpeter Raymond Lovesong, vocalist Doggen (TC Lethbridge), conductor Martin Schellard and vocal chanters O.K Simon and Merrick Godhaven.

== Composition ==
Extending the accessible pop sound of 20 Mothers, Interpreter is an adventurous, playful rock album with electronic overtones. While described by critics to be an album of space rock or glam pop reminiscent of Mott the Hoople, the eclectic record incorporates acoustic folk, idiosyncratic glam rock, orchestral pop, anthemic guitar music and "novelty Krautrock moon-opera," leading to what writer James Delingpole called a "weird, futuristic netherworld of Cope's own devising." The lushly produced album is laden with string arrangements, synthesisers and electric guitars, and was compared by Delingpole to early 1970s rock with its usage of Mellotrons, "early Roxy" keyboards and "Mott the Hoople guitars" and to the 1990s pop of The Lightning Seeds. Writers have highlighted the album's witty lyrics and 'nuttiness'. The album's contents are split into "Phase 1" and "Phase 2".

Opening song "I Come from Another Planet, Baby" is among Cope's most upbeat and joyful songs, sung in an exaggerated "English" accent that drew comparison to David Bowie, and incorporating krautrock-inspired noise. "I've Got My TV and My Pills" was described as an attempt by Cope to debunk some of "the myths surrounding his eccentric persona." Music critic Sam Upton described "Planetary Sit-In" as a "sterling astral ballad." "The Battle for the Trees" celebrates the organised protests against the Newbury bypass construction, while "Cheap New-Age Fix" is in a trashy garage rock style and attacks "wannabe poseurs" with only a superficial interest in New Age subjects, as opposed to Cope's more intense focus on environmentalism and heathenism. The surreal "S.p.a.c.e.r.o.c.k. with me" was influenced by Amon Düül II and features what Cope described as "outrageous diva vocals" from guest contributor Lynn Davies. A sample of Martin Luther King Jr. saying "truth crushed to Earth will rise again" is used as a mantra in "Re-Directed Male". Some songs feature themes of extraterrestrial travel.

== Release ==
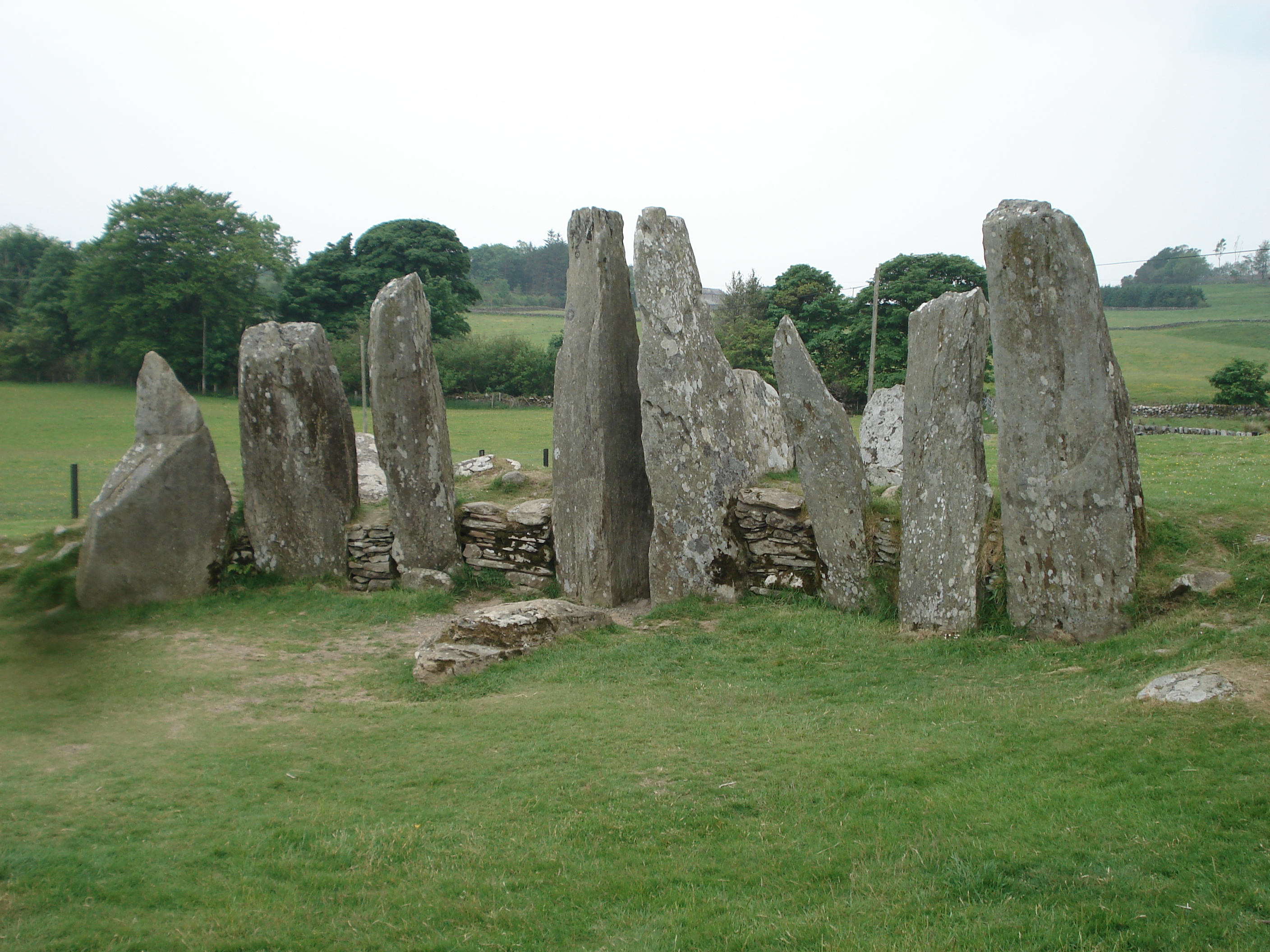
Cairnholy, Scotland, as depicted on the cover of Interpreter.

Advertised as a "psychic relief in the mid-90s", Interpreter was released on 14 October 1996 by Echo Records in the United Kingdom, and on 22 August 1997 by Cooking Vinyl in the United States. The dramatic science fiction-style album cover depicts the standing stones of Cairnholy in south west Scotland, exemplifying Cope's interest in Neolithic sites and experience in archaeology. It is not his first album cover to feature Neolithic structures, as those used for Jehovahkill (1992) and Rite (1993) similarly featured standing stones. The elaborate packaging features numerous social and political quotes and a foldout "mind map" of sites surrounding Cope in the Marlborough Downs entitled Julian Cope's Mythological Mind Map of the Marlborough Downs.

The album was not a commercial success for Cope. It became his last album to reach the UK Albums Chart, debuting and peaking at number 39 before falling to number 93 the following week, making it his lowest charting album since My Nation Underground (1988). Two singles from the album, "I Come from Another Planet Baby" and "Planetary Sit-In", both reached number 34 on the UK Singles Chart, becoming his last charting singles. As Interpreter was Cope's final album for Echo, it marked the end of the musician as a traditionally signed music act; he released his subsequent material independently. It was also Cope's final major album under his own name to be released in the 1990s, as he prioritised other music projects and his archaeological research for the remainder of the decade. He would not release another "regular" album until Citizen Cain'd in 2005.

== Critical reception ==
Professional ratings
Review scores
Source	Rating
Allmusic	4/5 stars
The Encyclopedia of Popular Music	4/5 stars
The Essential Rock Discography	5/10

Reviewing Interpreter for CMJ New Music Monthly, Steve Ciabattoni wrote that "Cope skews out more of his cosmically conscious, organic orgasm rock," noting that although some songs may seem goofy on the surface, "don't doubt that it all makes perfect sense to Cope. Playing a sort of intergalactic court jester, he reads this psychic rock tunes with a straight face, even if he does sometimes have his tongue in cheek." James Delingpole of The Telegraph wrote that although the album is "patchy and sometimes infuriating," citing the "Smurf noises" and attempts at rapping to be flawed, he wrote that, "as always, there's no shortage of catchy melodies, nor of moments which recall the majesty of earlier classics such as Fried or World Shut Your Mouth. If you're not a fan, though, you'll probably find it insufferably twee." In their review, Q referred to Cope as "the Andrew Lloyd Webber of garage rock." Select ranked the album at number 7 in their list of the top 50 albums of 1996, writing that "this joyous affair bears fitting testimony to the most prolific mind in British pop. Ably assisted by loyal henchmen The Boy Anal, this is the sound of a man in charge of most things."

Among retrospective reviews, Ned Raggett of AllMusic hailed the album as "another wiggy, involved collection of musical highs." He commented that Cope "sounds like a man on a mission, but determined to have fun as he goes", resulting in an "adventurous, fun romp, with the atmosphere often recalling such lush and beautiful Cope numbers as 'An Elegant Chaos'." The New Yorker wrote that the "wild and woolly rock record" was one of Cope's strongest releases, finding its song titles to "read like manifestos." Trouser Press hailed the "at times-luxuriously produced album", writing: "Thrust by Cope's boundless enthusiasm, the blend of wit, intelligence and unhinged nuttiness is irresistible, one of those experiences that's best accepted without much deliberation." In The Rough Guide to Rock, Nig Hodgkins wrote that Interpreter was Cope's "most commercial solo effort to date", writing that it "crystallized the pop promise of 20 Mothers." He felt that the "very together album" would have been more commercially successful if Cope released "S.p.a.c.e.r.o.c.k. with Me" as the first single "instead of comparatively weaker numbers."

In 1998, Interpreter received an Indie Award from the Association for Independent Music (AFIM) for the best alternative rock album of the year released on an independent label. In his book Turn on Your Mind: Four Decades of Great Psychedelic Rock, writer Jim DeRogatis ranked Interpreter at number 60 in his list "The Ultimate Psychedelic Rock Library: One-Hundred Eighty-Nine Albums You Can't Live Without." Neil Hannon of The Divine Comedy praised the single "I Come from Another Planet, Baby" in a singles column for Select, commenting: "I dig them drums. He's not afraid to go beyond the realms of human endurance for the sake of his art, and I like that."

== Track listing ==
All tracks are written by Julian Cope.

No.	Title	Length
1.	"I Come from Another Planet, Baby"	3:29
2.	"I've Got My TV & My Pills"	2:22
3.	"Planetary Sit-In"	3:31
4.	"Since I Lost My Head, It's Awl-Right"	2:37
5.	"Cheap New-Age Fix"	4:34
6.	"The Battle for the Trees"	7:13
7.	"Arthur Drugstore"	3:40
8.	"s.p.a.c.e.r.o.c.k. with Me"	3:41
9.	"Re-Directed Male"	4:16
10.	"Maid of Constant Sorrow"	4:01
11.	"The Loveboat"	2:45
12.	"Dust"	6:10

== Charts ==
Chart (1996)	Peak position
UK Albums Chart	39

== Personnel ==
Extracted from the "Julian Cope all purpose mythological mind map of the Marlborough Downs & surrounding area" included as the album insert:

- Julian H – vocals, "furnished" "wa-guitars", bass guitar, Mellotrons (400 and Mark II)
- Thighpaulsandra – ARP & VCS3 synthesizers, string orchestrations, piano, preened vocals, organ solo at the end of track 4
- Flinton Chalk a.k.a. Sid Mooneye (Spiritualized) – Lead guitars and vocals on tracks 2, 6, 8, 9 and 10.
- Rooster Mark Cosby (Synus) – drummer and cymbalist
- Stee-Vroom Ferrera – drums on tracks 1, 3, 4, and 11
- Doggen (TC Lethbridge) – vocals "like Edward Van Gottsching" throughout the Ambulance & Radio-Sit In sessions
- Mavis Grind – vocals on track 11
- Lynn Davis of CUMRY – "diva" vocals on track 8
- Jody Evans (Anal/E. Wrecked) – piano on track 12
- Raymond Lovesong – "drunken sax" on track 11, "high-note trumpets" on track 3
- Merrick Godhaven & O.K Simon – chanted vocals on track 9
- Craig J. Stratton, EOS Counsel, Jason Glover & Amanda Tomlinson – string players on tracks 3, 4, 6 and 7
- Martin Schellard – conductor
