= Euphoria (Canadian band) =

Canadian band formed in 1993

- Origin: Toronto, Ontario, Canada
- Genres: Americana, electronic, blues, rock, dance
- Years active: 1993–present
- Labels: Six Degrees; Rounder Records; EMI Music Publishing; The Orchard; Sony Music Entertainment
- Website: www.euphoria.to

Euphoria is a Canadian band formed in 1993 by Emmy™ nominated guitarist and composer Ken Ramm. Ken Ramm is the legally registered holder of the USPTO and Canadian trademarks, in the name Euphoria, for a musical group.

== History ==
Their 1999 self-titled debut album Euphoria featured guest appearances by Geddy Lee (Rush), Roy Babbington (Soft Machine), Anne Dudley (Art of Noise), and Juliet Roberts. In 1999, the track "Delirium" charted on North American radio. "Delirium" was also used in The Ongoing History of New Music episode "Alt-Rock's Greatest Instrumentals" (Episode 422, 2003).

Euphoria's next album, Beautiful My Child, featuring Kad Achouri, Ken Whiteley, Mont Campbell, B. J. Cole and Gayle Day, among others, was recorded in the UK and released by Six Degrees Records in 2001.

In 2006, Euphoria released their third album, Precious Time, which featured full-length vocal tracks from singers Tracy Bonham and Tina Dico. It also included contributions from ten other musicians, including Howard Levy and Pete Lockett. The opening track, "Back Against The Wall", was featured in the NPR Jazz article, Dragging The Blues Into The 21st Century by Nick Morrison (A Blog Supreme, January 12 2001).

In 2007, EMI Music Publishing released an "in-house" two-CD set titled Sinners and Saints, as well as The Blue Remixes.

In 2013, the E4 collection was released by British company AWAL in both an instrumental and album version.

In 2022, Euphoria released Deep Calls Out Remixes via BFE, The Orchard, and Sony Music Entertainment. The EP features six distinctly different mixes of the song Deep Calls Out, with styles ranging from Rock to Dub, Pop, Alternative Dance, Acoustic and Ambient, and containing instrumental contributions from synthesizer player Patrick Gleeson, co-producer Steve Addabbo, Steven Van Zandt drummer Rich Mercurio and KCRW music director Ale Cohen. The artwork is by longtime Euphoria collaborator Christine Alicino.

In 2026, Euphoria released their fifth album, Five Time A Charm via BFE, The Orchard and Sony Music Entertainment. The album features eleven musical pieces, encompassing a variance in song and compositional form. With styles ranging from Rock to Classical influences, Pop, Alternative Dance, Acoustic and Jazz, and containing instrumental contributions from synthesizer player Dr. Patrick Gleeson, co-producer Steve Addabbo, drummers Alex Alexander & Rich Mercurio, bassist Mamadou Ba, KCRW music director Ale Cohen, cellist Eleanor Norton, clarinetist Lone Widhal Madsen and vocalists Isabella Durso and Raena Jade. The artwork is by longtime Euphoria collaborator Christine Alicino.

Euphoria's music has been used in television shows, including CSI: Crime Scene Investigation, Malcolm in the Middle,Roswell, and Luck, among others. Films include The Expendables 3, Vanilla Sky, and Hidalgo. Euphoria's music has also been used in advertising campaigns by Apple Computer and Nissan. The Dark Side of Flowers, a composition composed by Euphoria leader Ken Ramm, from the Five Times A Charm album, was added to the Gathering The Fragments (registration number 17016607) collection at Holocaust Museum, Yad Vashem in Jerusalem, in 2026.

== Discography ==
- Euphoria (1999, Six Degrees)
- Delirium Remixes (EP - 1999)
- Beautiful My Child (2001, Six Degrees)
- Sweet Rain Remixes (EP - 2001)
- Precious Time (2006, Zoë Records/Rounder)
- Sinners and Saints (2007, EMI Music Publishing)
- The Blue Remixes (2007, EMI Music Publishing)
- E4 Instrumental (2013, BFE/The Orchard/Sony)
- E4 Vocal (2013, BFE/The Orchard/Sony)
- Euphoria Remix EP (2016, Folistar)
- Deep Calls Out Remixes (EP - 2022, BFE/The Orchard/Sony)

== Track listing ==
=== Euphoria (1999) ===
01. Delirium – 5:01

02. (Is This) Heaven? – 4:04

03. Sleep – 4:20

04. Wait For You – 4:59

05. Notting Hill Gate – 2:04

06. Lost On A River – 5:00

07. The Dreamer – 5:47

08. Watching The Skies – 5:15

09. Elevator To My Soul – 3:54

10. The Road – 6:20

=== Beautiful My Child (2001) ===
01. Sweet Rain – 3:22

02. Little Gem – 4:30

03. In The Pink – 3:18

04. Runaway Monday – 3:25

05. Beautiful My Child – 3:31

06. Desert Drive – 5:08

07. By The Sea – 4:12

08. Cactus – 2:20

09. Devil May Care – 4:03

10. Outside – 2:43

11. 1001 Dreams – 4:24

12. Silky Delta – 2:39

=== Precious Time (2006) ===
01. Back Against the Wall – 5:19

02. Blue – 3:34

03. Cowboys – 5:33

04. Sinners and Saints – 3:46

05. The Glendale Train – 2:29

06. Fire in the Hole – 3:18

07. Precious Time – 4:43

08. The Getaway – 5:07

09. Anyone Can Lose – 4:41

10. Forever Dust – 4:23

11. Kolkata – 3:17

12. Vapor – 10:26

=== e4 Vocal (2013) ===
01. In My Dreams – feat Robyn Dell'Unto – 2:53

02. Keeps You Going – feat Robyn Dell'Unto – 4:01

03. Remembrance Day – feat Robyn Dell'Unto – 3:18

04. Drift With Me – feat Robyn Dell'Unto – 3:19

05. Sway Song – feat Robyn Dell'Unto – 3:23

06. N'Awlins [The Lumber River Chronicles] – feat Robyn Dell'Unto – 3:29

07. Black Magic – feat Kalisa Ewing – 4:28

=== e4 Instrumental (2013) ===
01. Keeps You Going – 4:01

02. Dream 1 – 1:15

03. A Whisper In The Wind – 4:18

04. Dream 2 – 1:09

05. Incarcerated – 4:28

06. Dream 3 – 1:31

07. Anne's House – 4:00

08. Dream 4 – 1:25

09. Remembrance Day – 3:10

10. Dream 5 – 1:17

11. Have To Yell – 5:07

12. Dream 6 – 0:18

13. Telephone – 4:34

=== Euphoria Remix EP (2016) ===
01. Sinners and Saints (Still Life Remix) – feat Tina Dico – 4:07

02. Sinners and Saints (Tunabeats Tasty Remix) – feat Tina Dico – 4:58

03. Blue (Blue Bombay Mix) – feat Tina Dico – 4:13

=== Deep Calls Out Remixes EP (2022) ===
01. Deep Calls Out (Album Mix) – 4:23

02. Deep Calls Out (Smooth Mix) – 4:16

03. Deep Calls Out (Café Ale Remix) – 4:17

04. Deep Calls Out (Acoustic Mix) – 4:27

05. Deep Calls Out (Dub Mix) – 4:27

06. Deep Calls Out (Ambient Mix) – 4:11

Five Times A Charm (2026)

01. Five Times A Charm

02. Racing With The Devil

03. No Rain

04. On The Severn Bridge

05. Deep Calls Out

06. Wrong Turn At The Crossroads

07. A Date With The Wolves

08. Intrusive

09. Don't Be Afraid (Of Your Love)

10. The Dark Side Of Flowers

11. Come Bach To Me
