= Love Peace & Fuck =

Studio album by Brain Donor
- Released: September 2001
- Genre: Rock, garage rock, hard rock
- Length: 1:07:13
- Label: Impresario
- Producer: Julian Cope

Brain Donor chronology
Love Peace & Fuck (2001)	Too Freud to Rock 'n' Roll, Too Jung to Die (2003)

Professional ratings
Review scores
Source	Rating
AllMusic	3/5 stars
The Guardian	3/5 stars
The Great Rock Discography	7/10

Love Peace & Fuck is the 2001 debut album by Julian Cope’s side project Brain Donor, released by Impresario records on CD and double LP. It was produced and directed by Cope with the help of long term collaborator Thighpaulsandra. The album was recorded by the power trio of Cope, lead guitarist Doggen Foster and drummer Kevin Bales, both formerly of Spiritualized. Cope plays bass, a role he had not assumed in a band context since The Teardrop Explodes in the early 1980s.

The lyrics center on Cope's then obsession with ancient, pagan cultures, including references to Celtic and Norse folklore, while the music inclines towards The Stooges and 1980s British Heavy Metal. Love Peace & Fuck was described by music critic Aaron Badgley as "pure noise" and "garage rock, prog rock, and...'Krautrock' all rolled into a 2001 sound".

Two singles were released from the album, "She Saw Me Coming" and "Get Off Your Pretty Face".

== Track listing ==
No.	Title	Writer(s)	Length
1.	"She Saw Me Coming"	Julian Cope, Anthony Foster, Kevin Bales	3:13
2.	"Get Off Your Pretty Face"	Cope	5:31
3.	"Pagan Dawn"	Cope	7:49
4.	"Odin's Gift to His Mother" • a. "Theme from "Speed Kills"" • b. "Shamanic 4 A.M." • c. "Consecrate the Fucker" • d. "Huntsabbers' Ball"	Nash Kato; Cope; Foster; Cope, Foster, Bales	13:16
5.	"Hairy Music"	Cope	5:04
6.	"U-Know!" / "You Take the Credit"	Cope, Foster, Bales	9:02
7.	"Lughnasad"	Cope	3:07
8.	"She's Gotta Have It"	Cope, Foster, Bales	20:15

Note

"You Take the Credit" is listed as a separate track on the album cover.

== Personnel ==
Credits adapted from the album's liner notes.

Musicians

- Julian Cope — vocals, bass, guitar
- Anthony "Doggen" Foster (credited as Dogman) — lead guitar
- Kevin "Kevlar" Bales — drums

Technical

- Julian Cope — producer, directed by
- David Wrench — recorded by
- John-Paul Braddock — recorded by
- Thighpaulsandra — mastering, synthesized by
- Christopher Patrick "Holy" McGrail — cover art, illustration
- Lisa Bennett — design
