= The Future Never Waits =

Studio album by Hawkwind
- Released: 28 April 2023
- Genre: Space rock
- Length: 68:55
- Language: English
- Label: Cherry Red

Hawkwind chronology
We Are Looking in on You (2022)	The Future Never Waits (2023)	Stories from Time and Space (2024)

The Future Never Waits is a 2023 studio album by British space rock band Hawkwind. It has received positive reviews from critics

== Reception ==
According to the review aggregator Metacritic, The Future Never Waits received "generally favorable reviews" based on a weighted average score of 80 out of 100 from 5 critic scores. Editors at AllMusic rated this album 3.5 out of 5 stars, with critic Thom Jurek writing that Hawwkind co-founder Dave Brock "shows no sign of slowing down" and this album "is, at once, more exciting and musically adventurous—even with the (minor) missteps" and "a significant late-career highlight from Hawkwind.". Writing at Louder Than War, Paul Clarke stated that there "is plenty to enjoy" for both new and old listeners and the music is "equally impressive is the ambition and range of styles explored". The track "Rama (The Prophecy)" begins with a quote from the movie The Brain from Planet Arous: "After I'm gone, your Earth will be free to live out its miserable span of existence, as one of my satellites, and that's how it's going to be..."

== Track listing ==
The Future Never Waits track listing
No.	Title	Writer(s)	Length
1.	"The Future Never Waits"	Dave Brock; Doug MacKinnon; Magnus Martin; Richard Chadwick; Tim Lewis	10:16
2.	"The End"	Brock	4:10
3.	"Aldous Huxley"	Martin	4:38
4.	"They're So Easily Distracted"	Martin	10:25
5.	"Rama (The Prophecy)"	Brock	8:30
6.	"USB1"	Brock; Martin; Chadwick	3:56
7.	"Outside of Time"	Brock	7:38
8.	"I'm Learning to Live Today"	Brock; MacKinnon; Chadwick	8:05
9.	"The Beginning"	Martin	8:22
10.	"Trapped in This Modern Age"	Brock	3:00
Total length:			68:55

== Personnel ==
Hawkwind

- Dave Brock – vocals, guitar, keyboards, synthesisers, engineering
- Richard Chadwick – vocals, drums
- Doug MacKinnon – bass guitar
- Magnus Martin – vocals, guitars, keyboards, bass guitar, engineering
- Thighpaulsandra – keyboards, synthesizers

Additional personnel

- Tanya Durrant – layout
- Jessie Metcalfe – photography
- NASA – photography
- Kris Tait – coordination
- Meriel Waissman – layout

== See also ==
- 2023 in British music
- List of 2023 albums
