= The Michel Publicity Window E.P. =

EP by Thighpaulsandra
- Released: 6 August 2001
- Genre: Psychedelic rock, electronica, industrial
- Length: 23:39 (CD); 9:02 (vinyl)
- Label: Eskaton; ESKATON 027

Thighpaulsandra chronology
| I, Thighpaulsandra (2001) | The Michel Publicity Window E.P. (2001) | Double Vulgar (2003) |

The Michel Publicity Window E.P. is a CD by Thighpaulsandra. The title track is a radio-friendly edit of the 27-minute epic from I, Thighpaulsandra, excising the ambient suites that bookend the rock midsection. The rest of the EP features forays into electronica and hard rock, and remains Thighpaulsandra's most commercial-sounding record to date. A limited edition of 500 copies were pressed on transparent amber vinyl.

== Track listing ==
All tracks are written by Thighpaulsandra

CD pressing
| No. | Title | Length |
|---|---|---|
| 1. | "Michel Publicity Window" | 3:42 |
| 2. | "Paralysed" | 5:25 |
| 3. | "Hovercar von Düsseldorf" | 5:20 |
| 4. | "Fouled" | 9:12 |
| Total length: | | 23:39 |

=== 7" pressing ===
Side A
| No. | Title | Length |
|---|---|---|
| 1. | "Michel Publicity Window" | 3:42 |

Side AA
| No. | Title | Length |
|---|---|---|
| 1. | "Hovercar von Düsseldorf" | 5:20 |
| Total length: | | 9:02 |

== Personnel ==
- Thighpaulsandra: Vocals, Mellotron, synthesizers
- Martin Schellard: Guitars and bass
- Malcolm Cross: Drums on "Michel Publicity Window"
- Michael Mooney: Gibson lap steel guitar on "Michel Publicity Window"
- Siôn Orgon: Vocals on "Paralysed"; drum kit and percussion on "Fouled"
- Butros Müller-Staal: electronic percussion on "Hovercar Von Düsseldorf"
- John Balance: Vocals and text on "Fouled"
