= I Come from Another Planet, Baby =

Single by Julian Cope

from the album Interpreter
- B-side: "How Do I Understand My Motorman?"/"If I Could Do It All Over Again, I'd Do It All Over You"
- Released: 15 July 1996
- Genre: Neo-psychedelia
- Length: 3:29
- Label: Echo
- Songwriter(s): Julian Cope
- Producer(s): Julian Cope

Julian Cope singles chronology
"Try Try Try" (1995)	"I Come from Another Planet, Baby" (1996)	"Planetary Sit-In" (1996)

"I Come from Another Planet, Baby" is a song by the English singer-songwriter Julian Cope. It is the first single released in support of his album Interpreter.

== Chart positions ==
Chart (1996)	Peak position
UK Singles Chart	34
