= Planetary Sit-In =

Single by Julian Cope

from the album Interpreter
- B-side: "Cummer in Summertime"/"Torch"
- Released: 23 September 1996
- Genre: Neo-psychedelia
- Length: 3:33
- Label: Echo
- Songwriter(s): Julian Cope
- Producer(s): Julian Cope

Julian Cope singles chronology
"I Come from Another Planet, Baby" (1996)	"Planetary Sit-In" (1996)

"Planetary Sit-In" is a song by the English singer-songwriter Julian Cope. It is the second single released in support of his album Interpreter.

== Chart positions ==
Chart (1996)	Peak position
UK Singles Chart	34
