= Rape Scene =

Studio album by Thighpaulsandra with Siôn Orgon and Martin Schellard
- Released: 30 August 2004
- Recorded: Early 2004
- Genre: Industrial music
- Length: 46:17
- Label: Ochre Records; OCH049LCD

Thighpaulsandra chronology
Double Vulgar (2003)	Rape Scene (2004)	Double Vulgar II (2005)

Rape Scene is the third album by Thighpaulsandra. The album was recorded live in the studio, and is credited to "Thighpaulsandra with Siôn Orgon and Martin Schellard". As a trio, Thighpaulsandra musically explores a sexual scenario involving rape fantasy and medical fetishism by way of a Gomco clamp, a device normally used to circumcise men. The liner notes credit the recording sessions as occurring in the winter of 2004, referring to the early months of the year instead of the final ones.

== Track listing ==
All tracks are written by Thighpaulsandra

No.	Title	Length
1.	"Joyful Misuse of the Gomco Clamp"	16:06
2.	"The Busy Jew"	15:14
3.	"His Lavish Showroom"	14:58
Total length:		46:17

== Personnel ==
- Thighpaulsandra: Piano, electric piano, theremin, synthesizers, melodica; vocals, farfisa organ, reed organ and accordion on "The Busy Jew"
- Siôn Orgon: drums, percussion, antique cymbals; vocals, piano and synthesizers on "Joyful Misuse…"; "polystyrene ratchet" on "The Busy Jew"; bowls and gongs on "His Lavish Showroom"
- Martin Schellard: Guitar; short wave radio on "Joyful Misuse…"; bass and drums on "The Busy Jew"; violin and toy piano on "His Lavish Showroom"
- Bob Cheung: "Chinese ensemble" on "Joyful Misuse…"
- Listra Cheung: "Chinese ensemble" on "Joyful Misuse…"
- Po Wing Yau: "Chinese ensemble" on "Joyful Misuse…"
