= Double Vulgar =

Studio album by Thighpaulsandra
- Released: 23 June 2003
- Genre: Industrial
- Length: 76:48
- Label: Retractor; RETRACTOR CD001

Thighpaulsandra chronology
The Michel Publicity Window E.P. (2001)	Double Vulgar (2003)	Rape Scene (2004)

Double Vulgar is the second album by Thighpaulsandra. The album is notable for its packaging: the artwork consists of sexually explicit, homoerotic imagery featuring bondage and edgeplay, and was initially refused by several printers. The lyrical content was also controversial: "His Royal Highness the Prince of Wales Breaches Reality" was written as a dedication to Charles, Prince of Wales, if he were to ever have sexual relations with one of his sons, while most of the other lyrics describe several equally explicit situations. "The Bush Administration Project" notably contains the line "And I am splashed with semen", sung by Thighpaulsandra's mother, contralto Dorothy Lewis.

The album expanded upon Thighpaulsandra's already extensive instrumental palette, including an autoharp, hurdy-gurdy and the rare photoelectric ANS synthesizer, which allows one to synthesize sounds from artificially drawn soundwaves and images. Other non-musical instruments include a scraper, heard at the end of "Double Vulgar"; and a large wheel similar to the one found on the game show Wheel of Fortune, found in the basement of a church, that forms the basis of "He Tastes of the Sea".

== Track listing ==
All tracks are written by Thighpaulsandra

No.	Title	Length
1.	"The Bush Administration Project"	9:37
2.	"Slammer"	7:15
3.	"On the Horns of Magda Reuth"	21:17
4.	"The Circumcision of Christ"	9:41
5.	"Double Vulgar"	18:45
6.	"He Tastes of the Sea"	3:21
7.	"His Royal Highness the Prince of Wales Breaches Reality"	6:52
Total length:		76:48

== Personnel ==
- Thighpaulsandra – vocals, piano, autoharp, Hammond organ, harpsichord, synthesizers, pianorgan, accordion, backing vocals on "Slammer"; ANS synthesizer on "On the Horns of Magda Reuth"; shortwave radio on "The Circumcision of Christ"
- Martin Schellard – guitars; bass on "Slammer", "The Circumcision of Christ" and "Double Vulgar"; computers on "Double Vulgar"
- Siôn Orgon – drums; vocals on "The Bush Administration Project", "Slammer" and "Double Vulgar"; gongs and backing vocals on "Double Vulgar"; clapping on "Slammer"; bells on "On the Horns of Magda Reuth"; singing bowls on "The Circumcision of Christ"
- Dorothy Lewis – vocals on "The Bush Administration Project" and "Double Vulgar"
- Dan Greensmith – backing vocals on "Slammer" and "Double Vulgar"
- Rob Greensmith – clapping on "Slammer"; backing vocals on "The Circumcision of Christ" and "Double Vulgar"
- The Boy Anal – VCS3 on "Slammer"; vocoder on "On the Horns of Magda Reuth"; synthesizers on "The Circumcision of Christ"; backing vocals on "Double Vulgar"
- Cliff Stapleton – hurdy-gurdy on "On the Horns of Magda Reuth"
- Frank Norton – scraper on "Double Vulgar"
- Ossian Brown – "Wheel of fortune" on "He Tastes of the Sea"
- John Balance – "Wheel of fortune" on "He Tastes of the Sea"
- Butros Müller-Staal – bass drum on "His Royal Highness…"
