= Dave Stewart (musician, born 1950) =

English musician (born 1950)

- Born: David Lloyd Stewart; 30 December 1950 (age 75); Waterloo, London, England
- Occupations: Keyboardist; composer
- Instrument: Keyboards
- Years active: 1967–present
- Labels: Broken, Stiff
- Formerly of: Uriel; Egg; Khan; Hatfield and the North; National Health; Bruford

David Lloyd Stewart (born 30 December 1950) is an English musician known for his work with the progressive rock bands Uriel, Egg, Khan, Hatfield and the North, National Health, and Bruford. Stewart is the author of two books on music theory and wrote a music column for Keyboard magazine (USA) for thirteen years. He has also composed music for TV, film and radio, much of it for Victor Lewis-Smith's production company. He has worked with singer Barbara Gaskin since 1981.

== History ==
Stewart was born in Waterloo, London. Having joined local covers band The Southsiders while still at school, Stewart's musical career began in earnest at the age of seventeen when he played organ in Uriel with Mont Campbell (bass, vocals), Steve Hillage (guitar, vocals) and Clive Brooks (drums). After a residency on the Isle of Wight in the summer of 1968, Hillage left the group to go to university. Uriel continued as a trio, later changed their name to Egg and subsequently recorded two albums for Decca. In 1969 Hillage briefly rejoined his former bandmates to record a one-off psychedelic album under the pseudonym Arzachel. In 1972 Stewart guested on Hillage's new band Khan's first album.

After the break-up of Egg in 1973, Stewart joined Hatfield and the North, described by author Jonathan Coe as "probably the best-loved of the so-called 'Canterbury' bands". (Coe's novel The Rotters' Club takes its title from the band's second album.) Hatfield broke up in 1975 and, after guesting with the Steve Hillage-led Gong on a few French gigs, Stewart founded National Health with fellow keyboardist Alan Gowen and ex-Hatfield guitarist Phil Miller. Finding a permanent drummer proved difficult; Bill Bruford played with the group for a few months and was eventually replaced by Pip Pyle, thereby reuniting three of the former Hatfield musicians. Stewart subsequently guested on Bill Bruford's debut solo album, Feels Good to Me (1977), before joining his band Bruford.

Having recorded three albums and played two successful US tours, the Bruford group was discontinued in 1980. Stewart immediately formed Rapid Eye Movement with his friends Pip Pyle (drums), Rick Biddulph (who had been a roadie and sound engineer for Hatfield and National Health) on bass and Jakko Jakszyk (guitar & vocals). The UK REM (not to be confused with the contemporaneous American band of the same name) was conceived primarily as a live band and never recorded an album, although poor-quality tapes of live concerts in France survive. Jakszyk recalls the band as being "a lot rougher than National Health, very structured but performed in a very anarchic way".

In 1981 Stewart changed musical direction and began experimenting with pop arrangements and songwriting. His first solo release, a heavy electronic reworking of Jimmy Ruffin's Motown soul classic "What Becomes of the Brokenhearted", featuring guest vocals by The Zombies' founder and vocalist Colin Blunstone, reached No. 13 in the UK Singles Chart and No. 34 in Australia. For a follow-up, Stewart recruited friend and former Hatfield backing vocalist Barbara Gaskin to record a version of the 1960s teen lament "It's My Party". Released in the autumn of 1981, the single reached No. 1 in Britain and Germany and topped the UK charts for four weeks. It also peaked at No.4 in Australia. Stewart and Gaskin have worked together ever since and have released seven albums. The duo occasionally play live gigs augmented by either Andy Reynolds (1990-2009) or Beren Matthews (2018 onwards) on guitar, and have performed in Tokyo (September 2001) and London (August 2018) as a quartet with Gavin Harrison on drums.

The keyboardist's side projects include reforming National Health in 1981 to produce a memorial album for keyboardist Alan Gowen, producing the hit single "Hole in My Shoe" and Neil's Heavy Concept Album for comedian Nigel Planer (well known for his hippie character in The Young Ones), and producing the first album by Bill Bruford's electro-jazz outfit Earthworks.

Stewart has also composed TV music – in the mid-1980s he wrote the new title theme to the revamped BBC music show The Old Grey Whistle Test and later wrote, produced, and performed much of the soundtrack to the TV drama series Lost Belongings, set in Northern Ireland. Since the 1990s, he has written music for TV programmes made by British production company Associated Rediffusion; these include the BBC series Inside Victor Lewis-Smith (1995), Ads Infinitum (BBC Two, 1999), and the 2003 documentary on the BBC Radiophonic Workshop Alchemists of Sound. In recent years, he has written string and choir arrangements for a number of acts, including Anathema, Porcupine Tree, and Steven Wilson (See "Arranger" below).

== Books ==
- Introducing the Dots: Reading & Writing Music for Rock Musicians (1980, later revised and reissued as The Musician's Guide To Reading & Writing Music)
- The Musician's Guide to Reading and Writing Music (1st Edition, 1993, Backbeat Books, ISBN 0879302739)
- The Musician's Guide to Reading and Writing Music (2nd Edition, 1999, Miller Freeman Books, ISBN 0879305703)
- Inside the Music: Guide to Composition (1999, Miller Freeman Books, ISBN 0879305711)
- Copious Notes (Co-written with Antony Vinall & Mont Campbell) (2007, Egg Archive, memoir and recollection)

== Discography ==
=== Band albums 1969–1980 ===
Arzachel

- 1969 : Arzachel

Egg

- 1970 : Egg
- 1971 : The Polite Force
- 1974 : The Civil Surface

Khan

- 1972 : Space Shanty

Hatfield and the North

- 1974 : Hatfield and the North (Virgin)
- 1975 : The Rotters' Club (Virgin)
- 1980 : Afters (Virgin compilation, 1980)

National Health

- 1978 : National Health
- 1978 : Of Queues and Cures
- 1982 : D.S. Al Coda (Memorial album to Alan Gowen)

Bill Bruford

- 1978 : Feels Good to Me

Bruford

- 1979 : One of a Kind
- 1980 : Gradually Going Tornado
- 1980 : The Bruford Tapes (live album)
- 2006 : Rock Goes To College (Broadcast 1979, DVD released 2006)

=== Band Archive CDs ===
- National Health: Missing Pieces (1996)
- Hatfield and the North: Hatwise Choice: Archive Recordings 1973—1975, Volume 1 (2005)
- Hatfield and the North: Hattitude: Archive Recordings 1973—1975, Volume 2 (2006)
- Uriel: Arzachel Collectors Edition (2007)
- Egg: The Metronomical Society (2007)

=== Solo single ===
- "What Becomes of the Broken Hearted", (Broken Records, 1981) (Colin Blunstone guest vocalist)

=== Singles / EPs with Barbara Gaskin ===
- "It's My Party" (Broken, 1981) (Note: Released with Stiff Records)
- "Johnny Rocco" (Broken, 1982)
- "Siamese Cat Song" (Broken, 1983)
- "Busy Doing Nothing" (Broken, 1983)
- "Leipzig" (Broken, 1983)
- "I'm in a Different World" (Broken, 1984)
- "The Locomotion" (Broken, 1986)
- "Walking the Dog" (Line (Germany) 1992)
- Hour Moon (EP) (Broken, 2009)

=== Albums with Barbara Gaskin ===
- Up from the Dark (compilation), Rykodisc (USA) RCD 10011 (1986)
- Broken Records - The Singles, MIDI Records (Japan) (1987)
- As Far as Dreams Can Go, MIDI Records (Japan) (1988)
- The Big Idea, Rykodisc RCD 20172 / MIDI Records (1989)
- Spin, Rykodisc RCD 20213 / MIDI Records (1991)
- Green and Blue, Broken Records BRCDLP-05 (March 2009)
- The TLG Collection, Broken Records BRCDLP-06 (October 2009)
- Broken Records – The Singles (Special Edition), Broken Records BRCDLP-01 (November 2010)
- As Far as Dreams Can Go (Special Edition), Broken Records BRCDLP-02 (November 2010)
- The Big Idea (Special Edition), Broken Records BRCDLP-03 (December 2011)
- Spin (Special Edition), Broken Records BRCDLP-04 (December 2011)
- Star Clocks, Broken Records BRCDLP-07 (September 2018)

=== As producer ===
- "How Beautiful You Are" (Peter Blegvad)
- "Dangerous Dreams" (Jakko Jakszyk 7" single)
- "Are My Ears on Wrong" (Jakko Jakszyk album track)
- Neil's Heavy Concept Album, East West 4509-94852-2 (1984)
- Earthworks (Bill Bruford, 1987)

=== As arranger ===
- Fear of a Blank Planet, Porcupine Tree 2006 (strings*)
- Schoolyard Ghosts, No-Man 2008 (strings*)
- Insurgentes, Steven Wilson 2008 (strings*)
- We're Here Because We're Here, Anathema 2010 (strings*)
- Kompendium, Rob Reed (Magenta) 2011 (released 2012) (strings*)
- Grace for Drowning, Steven Wilson 2011 (strings* & choir)
- Falling Deeper, Anathema 2011 (strings*)
- Storm Corrosion, Storm Corrosion 2012 (strings*)
- Weather Systems, Anathema 2012 (strings*)
- The Raven That Refused to Sing, Steven Wilson 2013 (strings*)
- Universal (live film + album), Plovdiv, Bulgaria, Anathema 2013 (strings**)
- Pale Communion, Opeth 2014 (strings*)
- Distant Satellites, Anathema 2014 (strings*)
- Hand. Cannot. Erase., Steven Wilson 2015 (strings* & choir)
- To the Bone, Steven Wilson 2017 (strings* & choir)
- In Cauda Venenum, Opeth 2019 (strings*)
- The Last Will and Testament, Opeth 2024 (strings*)

(* Strings performed by the London Session Orchestra, produced by Dave Stewart.)

(** Strings performed by the Plovdiv Philharmonic Orchestra.)

=== Other appearances ===
- Fish Rising, Steve Hillage, 1975
- Hopper Tunity Box, Hugh Hopper, 1977
- Open, Steve Hillage, 1979
- Cutting Both Ways, Phil Miller, 1987
- Surveillance, Walkie Talkies, 1980
- Split Seconds, Phil Miller, 1989
- Seven Year Itch, Pip Pyle, 1998
- Robert Wyatt & Friends in Concert, 2005 (concert recorded in 1974)
- The Bruised Romantic Glee Club, Jakko Jakszyk, 2006
- Conspiracy Theories, Phil Miller, 2006
- Cheating the Polygraph, Gavin Harrison, 2015
- Too, Dizrythmia, 2016
