= The Civil Surface =

Studio album by Egg
- Released: December 1974
- Recorded: August 1974
- Studios: Saturn Studios, Worthing, West Sussex
- Genres: Progressive rock, avant-garde music
- Length: 40:36
- Labels: Caroline Records, Esoteric Recordings
- Producer: Egg

Egg chronology
The Polite Force (1971)	The Civil Surface (1974)	Seven Is A Jolly Good Time (1985)

Professional ratings
Review scores
Source	Rating
AllMusic	4/5 stars

The Civil Surface is the third and final studio album by the English progressive rock band Egg, originally released in 1974 on Caroline Records. The band had broken up in 1972, leaving some of their favourite stage pieces unrecorded. At organist Dave Stewart's suggestion, the trio re-united solely to record these final numbers. Among the guest musicians on the album are Steve Hillage (guitar), Lindsay Cooper (oboe, bassoon) and vocalists Amanda Parsons, Ann Rosenthal and Barbara Gaskin.

Listeners have complained that the drums are mixed too loud on the album's organ trio pieces. In an article written for the UK fanzine Ptolemaic Terrascope in 1990 (quoted in Mark Powell's liner notes of the Esoteric Recordings CD re-release), Stewart explains that it was the unbending wish of drummer Clive Brooks that his drums be featured prominently in the mix, and that the other members were unable to persuade him otherwise.

== Reception ==
In a 2007 review for website All About Jazz, John Kelman wrote, "The Civil Surface reflects widening interests, with Stewart's greater jazz-centricity and wryly melodic Canterbury flavor most notable on the longer tracks "Germ Patrol," "Enneagram" and "Wring Out the Ground (Loosely Now)" ... The complex writing—episodic tracks filled with complex meters, rich harmonies and tight arrangements, as well as some strong solos—bears an unmistakable link to Hatfield but, with Campbell's rigorous classicism an equal part of the equation, it still sounds like Egg."

== Track listing ==
Side one
No.	Title	Writer(s)	Length
1.	"Germ Patrol"	Mont Campbell, Dave Stewart	8:31
2.	"Wind Quartet I"	Campbell	2:20
3.	"Enneagram"	Campbell, Stewart	9:07

Side two
No.	Title	Writer(s)	Length
4.	"Prelude"	Campbell	4:17
5.	"Wring Out the Ground (Loosely Now)"	Campbell	8:11
6.	"Nearch"	Campbell	3:22
7.	"Wind Quartet II"	Campbell	4:48

== Personnel ==
- Dave Stewart – organ and piano, electric piano, bass (6)
- Mont Campbell – bass, vocals (5), French horn, piano
- Clive Brooks – drums

=== Guests ===
- Steve Hillage – guitar (5)
- Lindsay Cooper – bassoon, oboe (1,6)
- Tim Hodgkinson – clarinet (1,6)
- Jeremy Baines – germophone and bone
- Amanda Parsons – vocals (4)
- Ann Rosenthal – vocals (4)
- Barbara Gaskin – vocals (4)

=== Wind Quartets ===
- Mont Campbell – French horn
- Maurice Cambridge – clarinet
- Stephen Solloway – flute
- Chris Palmer – bassoon
