= Khan (band) =

English progressive rock band

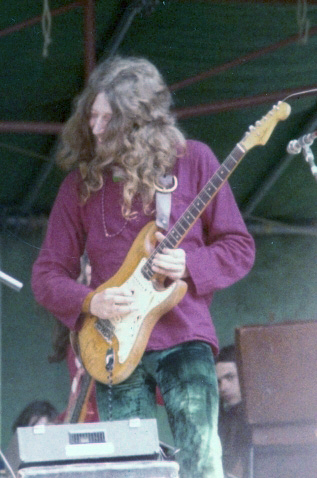
Steve Hillage playing in Hyde Park, 1974

Khan were an English progressive rock band of the Canterbury scene during 1971–1972.

Formed by Steve Hillage from Uriel, the initial line-up was Steve Hillage (guitar), Nick Greenwood (bass guitar, from The Crazy World of Arthur Brown), Dick Heninghem (organ) and Pip Pyle (percussion). Pyle quickly moved on to Gong and by the time the band played its first gig in June 1971 he had been replaced by Eric Peachey. In October 1971, Dick Heninghem left as well, replaced by Dave Stewart for the duration of the album sessions.

The album Space Shanty was released in June 1972, followed by a UK tour supporting Caravan, for which Canadian organist Val Stevens joined. Songs like "Stranded" and "Driving To Amsterdam" attempt atmospheres reminiscent of Uriah Heep's epic ballads (something not often done in a direct and dedicated way in the Canterbury scene - while Kevin Ayers may be comparable, a key difference is that Hillage's lyrics and compositions aren't detached or ironic.)

In the summer of 1972, Hillage put together a new version of the band, retaining Peachey but adding Dave Stewart on keyboards and Nigel Griggs on bass. New material was written and rehearsed, and a few live performances took place in September–October 1972, but Decca's refusal to commit to the release of a second album led Hillage to break up the band and join Kevin Ayers's band, then Gong. Some material on Steve Hillage's first solo album, Fish Rising, was originally planned for Khan's aborted second album.

The first Khan lineup split up after the tour with Caravan to promote Space Shanty. Essentially Nick Greenwood, the bass player, who was an important part of it, left the band. I guess we were all disappointed that the album didn’t do better, and Nick was pretty frustrated. But at the point Egg had also just broken up, and so I invited Dave to join me in a Khan Mk II lineup. It was with this second Khan lineup that I developed a whole bunch of material for a second album. It was started to sound pretty good but I was getting increasingly despondent at the lack of enthusiasm from the record company. I was just 21 and I felt I was too young for this kind of music business slog, so I called it a day on Khan in late October 1972. I wanted to play in other peoples’ bands for a while, and it was my good luck to get the call from Kevin Ayers. A lot of this Khan Mk II material was eventually used on Fish Rising.

— Steve Hillage on the reasons for Khan's break-up.

While in Gong, Hillage continued to write riffs but the larger musical dimension drew more from Daevid Allen's psychedelic lyrics and story concepts. Hillage's solo work also mostly sees him playing within the more typical Canterbury jazz/prog (Caravan etc.), leaving Space Shanty as a fairly unusual 'one-off' type of recording.

== Members ==
- Steve Hillage – guitar, vocals (1971–1972)
- Nick Greenwood – bass, vocals (1971–1972)
- Pip Pyle – drums (1971)
- Dick Henninghem – keyboards (1971)
- Eric Peachey – drums (1971–1972)
- Dave Stewart – keyboards (1971–1972, 1972)
- Val Stevens – keyboards (1972)
- Nigel Griggs – bass (1972)

== Line-ups ==
April 1971	April–October 1971	October 1971–January 1972	January–June 1972
Steve Hillage - guitar, vocals; Nick Greenwood - bass, vocals; Dick Heninghem - keyboards; Pip Pyle - drums, percussion	Steve Hillage - guitar, vocals; Nick Greenwood - bass, vocals; Dick Heninghem - keyboards; Eric Peachey - drums, percussion	Steve Hillage - guitar, vocals; Nick Greenwood - bass, vocals; Eric Peachey - drums, percussion; Dave Stewart - keyboards	Steve Hillage - guitar, vocals; Nick Greenwood - bass, vocals; Eric Peachey - drums, percussion; Val Stevens - keyboards
July–October 1972
Steve Hillage - guitar, vocals; Eric Peachey - drums, percussion; Dave Stewart - keyboards; Nigel Griggs - bass

== Discography ==
Year	Artist	Title
1972	Khan	Space Shanty
