= AudioMulch =

Audio computer software

- Developer: Ross Bencina
- Release: 24 March 1998
- Stable release: 2.2.5 / 29 March 2016
- Written in: C++
- Operating system: Microsoft Windows and Mac OS X
- Type: Digital audio editor
- Website: www.audiomulch.com

AudioMulch is a modular audio application used for music production, real-time processing of live and prerecorded audio, and sound synthesis.

AudioMulch has a patcher-style graphical user interface, in which modules called contraptions can be connected together to route audio and process sounds. Included modules range from ones suited to electronic dance music, such as a bassline-style synthesizer and a drum machine, to a delay-line granulator and stereo spatializer, along with effects such as ring modulation, flanging, reverb, and delays. In addition to these internal contraptions, AudioMulch supports VST and VSTi plugins.

== History ==
=== Origins ===
AudioMulch was developed by musician Ross Bencina based on his performance practice in the mid-1990s. At that time, live computer-based sound processing systems were often expensive and restricted to use within research institutions. By 1995, however, the processing capabilities of the personal computer were sufficient that Bencina could create OverSYTE, a real-time performance granulator. Bencina used OverSYTE to process sound in his live performances with vocalists and instrumental musicians. AudioMulch grew out of the limitations of OverSYTE, which could process only one sound at a time. In contrast, AudioMulch can process multiple sound sources at once.

=== Development ===
AudioMulch 1.0 was developed for Microsoft Windows in the C++ programming language, using the Borland C++ Builder development environment. Development began in 1997 and the first release—beta version 0.7b1—was made available for download in March 1998. Version 1.0 was released in February 2006 after 36 beta releases.

=== Version 2.0 ===
AudioMulch 2.0 was released on 5 June 2009. It is available for both Windows and Macintosh computers.

=== Version 2.1 ===
Version 2.1 was released on 4 August 2010. It added custom time signatures, Audio Unit plugin support on Mac OS X, dynamic processing contraptions, and an alternate light gray color scheme.

== Features ==
=== AudioMulch 1.0 features ===
- An interactive user interface with three main panes:
1. a patcher for routing audio between contraptions,
2. a pane containing control panels for each contraption,
3. an automation timeline supporting automation of contraption parameters.
- Support for real-time sound-processing and performance.
- 24 channels of real-time input/output.
- Multi-channel recording and playback of multiple sound files.
- Contraptions including signal generators, effects, filters and mixers.
- Input sound can be taken from sound files or real-time audio input.
- Output is heard in real-time and can be simultaneously recorded to a sound file.
- Any processing parameter in AudioMulch can be controlled by MIDI. This includes the use of external hardware such as knob boxes, gaming controllers, virtual reality gloves, and custom control devices.

=== AudioMulch 2.0 features ===
- A new Patcher with advanced drag-and-drop patching and MIDI routing.
- MIDI and automation control for Clock transport (tempo, stop, start) and Metasurface interpolation.
- Enhanced Drums contraption with 8 channels and a new pattern editor supporting arbitrary length high-resolution patterns.
- Expanded multichannel audio I/O capability to support up to 256 channels in each direction and improved compatibility with consumer multichannel audio interfaces using DirectSound and Windows Multimedia drivers.

=== Future ===
AudioMulch's road map listed planned features for future updates, including new sound mangling, filtering, and resonating contraptions, an overhauled undo system, third-party host integration, and performance modulation. Further enhancements to existing sound and keyboard controls were also planned.

The future of AudioMulch is uncertain, as the latest documented AudioMulch release was in 2016 and the latest documented feature addition occurred in 2012. Its reliance on a 32-bit architecture may also limit compatibility with modern operating systems.

== Notable users ==
- Nine Inch Nails
- Girl Talk
- Four Tet
- Lackluster
- Erdem Helvacioglu
- Shitmat
- Pimmon
- Tim Hecker

The discography on AudioMulch's website lists other artists who have used AudioMulch in commercial releases.

== See also ==
- Granular synthesis
- Modular synthesizer
- Computer music

== Bibliography ==
- AudioMulch website – info page. Retrieved on 2009-01-28
- AudioMulch website – discography. Retrieved on 2009-01-28
- Clatterbox website. Retrieved on 2009-01-28
- Dugan, S. (2006), "Girl Talk". In Remix Magazine, 1 December 2006. Retrieved on 2009-01-28
- (2008) "Girl Talk/Gregg Gillis on New Album/Music Industry". In The Washington Post, 29 July 2008. Retrieved on 2009-01-28
- Inglis, S. (2003), "FourTet – Kieran Hebden: Recording Rounds". In Sound on Sound, July 2003. Retrieved on 2009-01-28
- Hsieh, C. (2005), "Audio Anarchy". In Remix Magazine, 1 June 2005. Retrieved on 2009-01-28
- Interview with the Nine Inch Nails by Greg Rule, Keyboard Magazine, February 2000. Retrieved on 2009-01-28
- Gallagher, M. (2004), "Between the Lines." In Electronic Musician Magazine, 1 February 2004.
- Bencina, R. (2006) "Creative Software Development: Reflections on AudioMulch Practice." In Digital Creativity, Routledge, Vol. 17, no. 1, pp. 11 – 24.
- Bencina, R. (1998), "Oasis Rose the Composition - Real-Time DSP with AudioMulch," Proceedings of the Australasian Computer Music Conference, ANU Canberra, pp. 85–92.
- Cleveland, B. (2007), "Erdem Helvacioglu". In Guitar Player, September 2007, pp. 32–33.
- Frere-Jones, S. (2008), "Re-Start: Laptops go Live". In The New Yorker, 15 September 2008, pp. 94–95.
