= Thighpaulsandra =

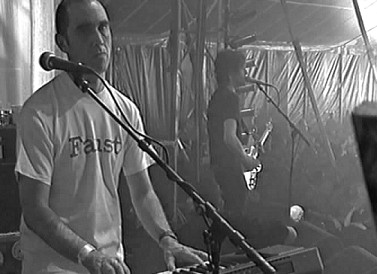
- Thighpaulsandra in concert with Spiritualized, 1998

Background information
- Origin: Pontypridd, Wales
- Genres: Electronic; ambient; industrial; space rock; dream pop; neo-psychedelia; drone; noise; glitch; experimental
- Occupation: Musician
- Instruments: Keyboards; vocals; guitar; bass; autoharp; violin; French horn; accordion; theremin; sampler
- Years active: 1981–present
- Label: Eskaton
- Member of: Queen Elizabeth; Hawkwind
- Formerly of: Coil; Spiritualized; URUK; UUUU

Timothy Lewis – best known by the stage name Thighpaulsandra – is a Welsh experimental musician and multi-instrumentalist, known mostly for performing on synthesizers and keyboards. He began his career working with Julian Cope in the late 1980s, becoming a member of Cope's touring band. A collaboration with Cope in 1993 followed, forming the experimental duo Queen Elizabeth. In 1997, former Cope guitarist Mike Mooney invited Thighpaulsandra to fill in for the departing Kate Radley on a Spiritualized tour, and he remained with the band until early 2008. In 1998, Lewis also became a member of the experimental band Coil. He has subsequently released several solo albums under the Thighpaulsandra moniker.

Lewis currently performs and records as part of URUK with Massimo Pupillo (of Italian band Zu) and UUUU, a band also featuring Valentina Magaletti and Wire members Graham Lewis and Matthew Simms. He has also been playing with The Charlatans' Tim Burgess since 2020, as part of Burgess' solo backing band. Since 2021 he has been touring with Hawkwind and appears as a performer and co-writer on their 2023 album The Future Never Waits.

== Career ==
Beginning his career in the early 1980s with the hair metal band Temper Temper, he next became the house engineer and studio manager at Loco Studios near Newport. It was here that he first met Julian Cope and, as they bonded over a shared love of krautrock, Thighpaulsandra was invited to contribute synthesizers to Cope's albums Autogeddon, 20 Mothers, Interpreter, and Rite^{2}. In 1997, he joined the band Spiritualized for a US tour and survived the cuts made to the band shortly thereafter. Thighpaulsandra can be heard on the records Live at the Albert Hall, Let It Come Down, Amazing Grace and Songs in A&E. Thighpaulsandra also collaborated with Spiritualized's Jason Pierce on the 2008 soundtrack to the Harmony Korine film Mister Lonely. In 1998 he began working with Coil with Peter Christopherson and John Balance, and performed on Astral Disaster, Musick to Play in the Dark Vol. 1 and Musick to Play in the Dark Vol. 2. Thighpaulsandra was largely responsible for convincing Christopherson and Balance to perform live for the first time in over a decade, first appearing at the Julian Cope curated Cornucopea festival at the Royal Festival Hall in 2000. As of 2021, Thighpaulsandra was working on upcoming Coil re-releases.

His first three solo releases came out via the Coil label, Eskaton. John Balance provided vocals for Thighpaulsandra's first release Some Head EP, and Peter Christopherson designed the artwork for the I, Thighpaulsandra double album and for the following "Double Vulgar" albums. The artwork caused some controversy with several printers not willing to reproduce the controversial imagery. Double Vulgar II was delayed, possibly for the same reason, along with the passing of friend and colleague John Balance in 2004.

Since leaving Spiritualized in 2008 Thighpaulsandra has worked with Elizabeth Fraser on her Sun's Signature project for Partisan Records and was part of her group for a series of live shows at the Royal Festival Hall in 2012 as part of the Meltdown Festival.

In September 2013 he joined Wire on their UK and European tours playing keyboards. After a hiatus from solo work, Thighpaulsandra released The Golden Communion in 2015.

In 2016 and 2017 respectively he began recording and touring with Massimo Pupillo (of Italian band Zu) as Uruk and Valentina Magaletti and Graham Lewis and Matthew Simns as UUUU. Uruk have released two albums, I Leave A Silver Trail through Blackness in 2017 and Mysterium Coniunctionis in 2018. UUUU's first release, entitled UUUU is a full-length album released in 2017 and their second, an EP entitled UUUU-EP, was released in 2018.

From 2020 Thighpaulsandra has been playing live with Tim Burgess and has appeared on his albums I Love The New Sky in 2020 and Typical Music in 2022 as both keyboard player and engineer.

Since 2021 he has been a member of Hawkwind and appears as a performer and co-writer on their albums The Future Never Waits, Stories From Time and Space and There Is No Space For Us.

Thighpaulsandra is currently working on a new Laniakea album with Daniel O'Sullivan and Massimo Pupillo.

== Discography ==
- Some Head EP – (2000)
- I, Thighpaulsandra – (2001)
- The Michel Publicity Window E.P. – (2001)
- Double Vulgar – (2003)
- Rape Scene – (2004)
- Double Vulgar II – (2005)
- Chamber Music – (2005)
- The Lepore Extrusion – (2006)
- The Clisto E.P. – (2007)
- The Golden Communion – (2015)
- Practical Electronics With Thighpaulsandra – (2019)
- Acid & Ecstacy – (2025)

Compilation appearances

- "Heaven Lies About Us in Our Infancy" on Brain in the Wire (2002)
- "Christ's Teeth" on ...It Just Is (2005)
- "Star Malloy" on Not Alone (2006)
- "Am Smear Challenger" on Brainwaves (2006)

Remixes

- "At the Crossroads Motel" on Cadaverous Condition: Destroying the Night Sky (2008)
- "Moses (Thighpaulsandra Remix)" on Elizabeth Fraser: Moses (2009)

=== with Coil ===
- Astral Disaster (1999)
- Musick to Play in the Dark Vol. 1 (1999)
- Musick to Play in the Dark Vol. 2 (2000)
- Coil Presents Time Machines (2000)
- Queens of the Circulating Library (2000)
- Constant Shallowness Leads to Evil (2000)
- Live One (2003)
- Live Two (2003)
- Live Four (2003)
- Megalithomania! (2003)
- The Key to Joy is Disobedience (2003)
- Black Antlers (2004)
- Selvaggina, Go Back into the Woods (2004)
- ANS (2004)
- The Ape of Naples (2005)

=== with Spiritualized ===
- The Abbey Road EP (1998)
- Royal Albert Hall October 10 1997 (1998)
- Stop Your Crying (2001)
- Let It Come Down (2001)
- Out of Sight (2001)
- Do It All Over Again (2002)
- Amazing Grace (2003)
- She Kissed Me (2003)
- Cheapster (2004)
- Songs in A&E (2008)

=== with Julian Cope ===
- Autogeddon (1994)
- Paranormal in the West Country
- 20 Mothers (1995)
- Ambulence
- I Come From Another Planet, Baby
- Interpreter (1996)
- Planetary Sit-In
- Propheteering
- Odin (1999)
- An Audience with Julian Cope
- Rite Now (2002)
- "Love Peace & Fuck (2001)"

=== with Queen Elizabeth ===
- Queen Elizabeth
- QE2: Elizabeth Vagina
- Queen Elizabeth Hall - Live

=== with The Waterboys ===
- A Rock in the Weary Land (2000)
- The Book Of Lightning (2007)

=== with Cyclobe ===
- The Visitors
- Angry Eelectric Finger Part Two: Paraparaparallelogramattica
- Wounded Galaxies Tap at the Window

=== with Uruk ===
- I Leave A Silver Trail Through Blackness
- Mysterium Coniunctionis
- The Descent Of Inana (2019)
- The Great Central Sun (2023)

=== with UUUU ===
- UUUU
- UUUU-EP

=== with Daniel O'Sullivan ===
- Folly (O Genesis)

=== with Tim Burgess ===
- I Love The New Sky (2020)

=== with Satellite Seven ===
- Session One (2024)

=== with Hawkwind ===
- We Are Looking In On You (live album, 2022)
- The Future Never Waits (2023)
- Stories From Time and Space (2024)
- There Is No Space for Us (2025)
