= Clive Brooks =

English drummer (1949–2017)

Clive Colin Brooks (28 December 1949 – 5 May 2017) was a drummer, best known for his work in the English progressive rock band Egg.

== Biography ==
=== Uriel/Egg ===
Clive Colin Brooks was born in Bow, East London. Answering a Melody Maker ad in early 1968, he joined Uriel, a blues-rock group formed by City of London School pupils Dave Stewart (keyboards), Mont Campbell (bass and lead vocals) and Steve Hillage (guitar and vocals). (The band re-grouped later under the name Arzachel and released one album in 1969.) With Hillage's departure in mid-1968, the remaining three continued as a trio and became Egg in January 1969. The band signed with Decca and released two albums on the label, splitting up in July 1972 (although they came back together to record a final album, The Civil Surface in 1974).

Egg's members first played together in Uriel, a Hendrix / Cream / blues / psychedelic group formed by school friends Steve Hillage (guitar), Mont Campbell and Dave Stewart. The line-up was completed when Clive Brooks answered their 'drummer wanted' ad in Melody Maker. Uriel began gigging in 1968 and in the summer of that year decamped to the Isle of Wight to play a club residency. Events from this trip were later immortalised in Egg's anthemic "A Visit To Newport Hospital".

At the end of the Isle of Wight stay Steve Hillage left the group to pursue his academic studies, later rising to fame as a '70s guitar hero. Uriel continued as an organ trio and fell in with a management company who forced a name change of 'The Egg' on the band. After signing with Decca in mid-1969 the band evolved into a hard-working live unit who won many fans on their travels round the UK. Under the musical leadership of Mont Campbell, short songs began to give way to long complex instrumentals influenced as much by Stravinsky as by the odd time signatures of Soft Machine. Psychedelia continued to loom large in Egg's consciousness, and when the group were let loose in a recording studio for the first time they revelled in the new sonic possibilities it offered, creating the deranged soundscape "Boilk"' on their first eponymous LP.

Egg and Decca parted company after the release of their second album The Polite Force, considered by many to be one of the finest prog albums ever recorded. Combining musical ingenuity, instrumental dexterity and super-tight performances, The Polite Force (produced by Neil Slaven) featured the much-loved "A Visit To Newport Hospital" (whose opening fuzz organ riff is often mistaken for heavy metal guitar), the thoroughly mad "Contrasong"' and the intricacies of "Long Piece no. 3", an extended instrumental piece in four movements. Accompanying these compositions is the nine-minute "Boilk II", a multi-layered sound collage with psychedelic overtones.

Egg battled on for another couple of years before disbanding in 1972. A 1974 studio reunion enabled the trio to record several of Mont Campbell's compositions which otherwise would have been lost to posterity. Entitled The Civil Surface, this album was to be Egg's last for 33 years.

=== Groundhogs and Liar ===
After the demise of Egg, Clive Brooks joined The Groundhogs after Ken Pustlenik left, recording two albums, Hogwash (1972) and Solid (1974).

In 1977, Clive Brooks joined the UK band Liar recording two albums, Straight From the Hip and Set the World on Fire. A third album was recorded in Los Angeles but never released.

=== Drum technician and later years ===
Brooks then became a regular drum technician for Pink Floyd, working with the band through to 1994. On 14 June 1981, during the last leg of The Wall Tour, Clive Brooks filled in for drummer Willie Wilson who had been taken ill. Parts of his performance are included on the album Is There Anybody Out There? The Wall Live 1980–81.

Brooks was re-united with Stewart in 2000 for the recording of a cover version of Soft Machine's "As Long As He Lies Perfectly Still" eventually released on Jakko Jakszyk's The Bruised Romantic Glee Club (2006).

He also worked as a drum technician for bands such as Toto, Robbie Williams, Jeff Wayne's The War of the Worlds 2007 tour, the Pink Floyd covers band, The Australian Pink Floyd Show, and in 2008 as the touring backline drum tech for Leonard Cohen.

Brooks died on 5 May 2017.
