= Equinox (disambiguation) =

An Equinox is the instant of time when the plane of Earth's equator passes through the center of the Sun, which occurs twice each year:

- March equinox
- September equinox

Equinox may also refer to:

- Equinox (celestial coordinates), either of two places on the celestial sphere at which the ecliptic intersects the celestial equator

== Arts and entertainment ==
=== Fictional characters ===
- Equinox (comics), a Marvel Comics supervillain
- Equinox (DC Comics), a DC comics character, son of Power Girl
- Equinox, a character in Batman: The Brave and the Bold

=== Film and television ===
- Equinox (1970 film), an American horror film
- Equinox (1986 film), a Canadian drama film
- Equinox (1992 film), an American film
- Equinox (TV programme), a British science and documentary programme 1986–2006
- "Equinox" (Star Trek: Voyager), a two-part episode of the TV series 1999
- Equinox (2020 TV series), a Danish TV series

=== Gaming ===
- Equinox (1986 video game)
- Equinox (1993 video game)

=== Literature ===
- Equinox (novel), a 1973 novel by Samuel R. Delany
- The Equinox, a occultism periodical 1909–1998
- EQuinox, the official magazine of EverQuest II

=== Music ===
==== Bands ====
- Equinox (thrash metal band), from Norway, started in 1987
- Equinox (electro-industrial band), a 1998 project of Front Line Assembly
- Equinox (Bulgarian band), Eurovision Song Contest 2018 contestants

==== Opera ====
- Equinox (opera), a Slovene-language opera by Marjan Kozina

==== Albums ====
- Equinox (Sérgio Mendes album), 1967
- Equinox (Styx album), 1975
- Equinox (Red Garland album), 1979
- Equinox (JO1 album), 2023
- Equinox (Omar Rodríguez-López album), 2013
- Equinox (Equilibrium album), 2025
- Equinox (EP), by Northlane and In Hearts Wake, 2016
- Equinoxe, by Jean Michel Jarre, 1978
- Equinoxe Infinity, by Jean Michel Jarre, 2018
- The Equinox (album), by Organized Konfusion, 1997

==== Songs ====
- "Equinox" (jazz standard), by John Coltrane, 1964
- "Equinox", by Heaven Shall Burn from Iconoclast (Part 1: The Final Resistance), 2008
- "Équinoxe", by C418 from Minecraft – Volume Alpha, 2011
- "First of the Year (Equinox)", by Skrillex, 2011
- "Vernal Equinox", a song by Can from Landed, 1975

== Businesses and organizations ==
- Equinox Group, an American luxury fitness company
- Equinox Minerals, a mining company headquartered in Canada and Australia
- Equinox (MLM), a defunct multi-level marketing company
- Equinox Systems, manufacturer of serial communications devices, acquired by Avocent
- Equinox Payments, formerly Hypercom, an electronic payment processing company
- Equinox initiative for racial justice, European anti-racist organization
- Equinox Publishing (Sheffield), an independent academic publishing based in Sheffield, UK
- Equinox Publishing (Jakarta), Jakarta-based publisher of books
- Equinoxe TV, a television channel in Cameroon
- Équinoxe (political party), a French political party

== Computing ==
- Equinox (Atari demogroup), 1988–2007
- Equinox (OSGi), an Eclipse project to implement OSGi R4.x

== Places ==
- Equinox Mountain, Vermont, U.S.

== Sports ==
- Vin Gerard (born 1986), ring name Equinox
- Jimmy Olsen (wrestler) (born 1986), ring name Equinox
- Equinox Marathon, an annual running marathon in Fairbanks, Alaska, U.S.
- Equinox (horse), a Japanese thoroughbred racehorse

== Transportation ==
- Celebrity Equinox, cruise ship launched in 2009
- Chevrolet Equinox, a General Motors SUV

== See also ==
- Spring equinox (disambiguation)
- Autumnal equinox (disambiguation)
- Equinox Day (disambiguation)
- Solstice (disambiguation)
