= Midsummer (disambiguation) =

Midsummer is a celebration to mark the time around the summer solstice.

Midsummer or Midsummer Night may also refer to:

== Festivals ==
- Chester Midsummer Watch Parade, UK
- Duanwu Festival, the Mid-Summer Festival on the 5th day of the 5th month in the Chinese lunisolar calendar
- NYC Midsummer, Swedish midsummer celebration in New York, USA

== Other uses ==
- Midsummer (painting), an 1887 painting by Albert Joseph Moore
- Midsummer Common, area of common land in central Cambridge, UK
- Midsummer House, restaurant in Cambridge, UK
- Midsummer Night (TV series), an upcoming Norwegian language television series
- Midsummer Night (painting), a 1926 painting by Nikolai Astrup

== See also ==
- A Midsummer Night's Dream (disambiguation)
- Central European Midsummer Time
- Midsommar, a 2019 folk horror film
- Midsommer, a 2003 psychological horror film
- Midsomer Murders, a long-running UK crime drama TV series
- Midsumma Festival, an annual festival held in Melbourne, Australia
- Midwinter (disambiguation)
- Solstice
- Summer solstice (disambiguation)
