= Midwinter (disambiguation) =

Midwinter is the middle of the winter.

Midwinter may also refer to:

- Midwinter (surname)
- Midwinter (album), a 2001 album by Terry McDade and the McDades
- Midwinter (novel), a 1923 novel by John Buchan
- Midwinter (video game), a 1989 video game designed by Mike Singleton
- Midwinter Day, or Midwinter, a celebration held in Antarctica
- Midwinter Pottery, founded 1910 in Burslem, Stoke-on-Trent, UK

== See also ==
- Yule
- James Midwinter Freeman (1827–1900), American clergyman and writer
- California Midwinter International Exposition of 1894, a World's Fair in San Francisco's Golden Gate Park
- Midsummer (disambiguation)
- Midvinterblot (disambiguation)
- Winter solstice (disambiguation)
- Winter (disambiguation)
