= Summer solstice (disambiguation) =

Summer solstice is the astronomical phenomenon that occurs on the longest day of the year.

Summer solstice may also refer to:

- June solstice, of the Northern Hemisphere
- December solstice, of the Southern Hemisphere

== Arts and entertainment ==
- Summer Solstice (1981 film), an American dramatic film
- Summer Solstice (2005 film), made-for-television film based on a story by Rosamunde Pilcher
- Summer Solstice (2003 film), independent feature film directed by George Fivas, based on the story "Atlantic Summer" by Jeffrey Gold
- Summer Solstice: Bee Stings, 1998 experimental music album, part 2 of the four part Seasons collective created by Coil
- The Summer Solstice (film), a 2007 Chinese film
- Summer Solstice (album), 1971 folk music album by Maddy Prior and Tim Hart
- "The Summer Solstice", a Filipino short story written by Nick Joaquin
- MTV Unplugged: Summer Solstice, 2017 live album by a-ha
- Summer Solstice (2023 film), a comedy film
- Summer Soulstice, a British music festival

== See also ==
- Midsummer (disambiguation)
- Summer (disambiguation)
- Solstice (disambiguation)
- Winter solstice (disambiguation)
- Autumnal equinox (disambiguation)
- Spring equinox (disambiguation)
