= Bataafse Petroleum Maatschappij =

Subcompany of the Royal-Dutch-Shell-oil company

Bataafse Petroleum Maatschappij (BPM)
- House flag
- Type: Subsidiary
- Industry: Oil extraction
- Founded: 1907
- Defunct: 1965
- Successor: Pertamina (legal successor); PT Shell Indonesia (1957-1965)
- Headquarters: Batavia, Dutch East Indies
- Parent: Royal Dutch Shell

Bataafse Petroleum Maatschappij or Bataafsche Petroleum Maatschappij (lit. 'Batavian Oil Company', colloquially known as BPM) was the Dutch East Indies and later Indonesian subsidiary of Royal Dutch Shell oil company established in 1907.

== History ==
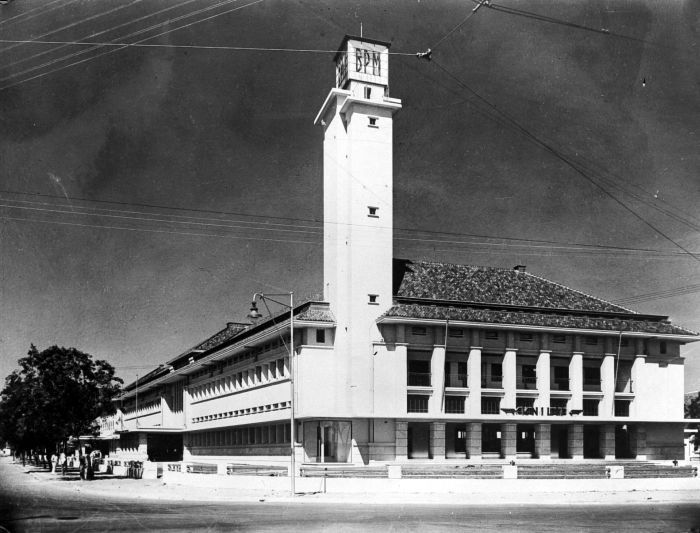
BPM moved into this building in Jakarta in 1938. The building is now the headquarter of Pertamina.

The BPM was established in 1907. It was Shell's main oil producing entity in Indonesia (at that time, Dutch East Indies) and dominated the Indonesian oil industry during the colonial era, making it one of the largest companies in the colonial economy. The main oil well of BPM was Pangkalan Brandan (North Sumatra), which is considered as the origin of the Royal Dutch Shell. More than 95% of Indonesia's crude oil was commercially produced by BPM in the 1920s. In 1938, the company moved into a new headquarter designed by the architectural firm Fermont-Cuypers.

The dual-listed nature of the Royal Dutch Shell meant that BPM was 60 percent owned by the Royal Dutch Petroleum Company] and 40% by the Shell Transport and Trading Company; it acted as a Dutch holding company for the merged Royal Dutch Shell Group along with its UK analogue the Anglo-Saxon Petroleum Company. The two were merged in 2005 creating a single holding structure for Shell.

After the Japanese occupation of Indonesia, Shell's original well at Pangkalan Brandan was taken over by the Indonesian army. In 1957, Pangkalan Brandan became the main asset of the newly formed Indonesian oil company, Permina, the predecessor of Pertamina. In the 1950s, US oil giants Caltex and Stanvac invested heavily in Indonesia, dropping the share of BPM to only 34% in 1957, compared to 46% for Caltex and 20% for Stanvac. Eventually, Shell pulled out of Indonesia in 1965 and would only re-enter (in distribution only) in the early 2000s.

== Cited works ==
- Braake, Alex L. (1944), Mining in the Netherlands East Indies, Ayer Publishing, pp. 68–9, 74, ISBN 9780405097775
- Coumbe, Albert T. (1923), "Petroleum Production and Trade of the Dutch East Indies", European foreign investments as seen by the U.S. Department of Commerce, United States. Bureau of Foreign and Domestic Commerce, ISBN 9780405097911
- Merrillees, Scott (2015). Jakarta: Portraits of a Capital 1950-1980. Jakarta: Equinox Publishing. ISBN 9786028397308.
