= Dongzhi (disambiguation) =

Dongzhi is a solar term in East Asian calendars and a festival celebrated by the Chinese and other East Asians.

Dongzhi may also refer to:

- Dongzhi County, in Anhui, China
- Dong Zhi (archer), a Chinese paralympic archer.
- Dongzhi Man, a Homo erectus specimen from Dongzhi County

== See also ==
- Winter solstice (disambiguation)
