= Morning =

Period of time from midnight or sunrise to noon

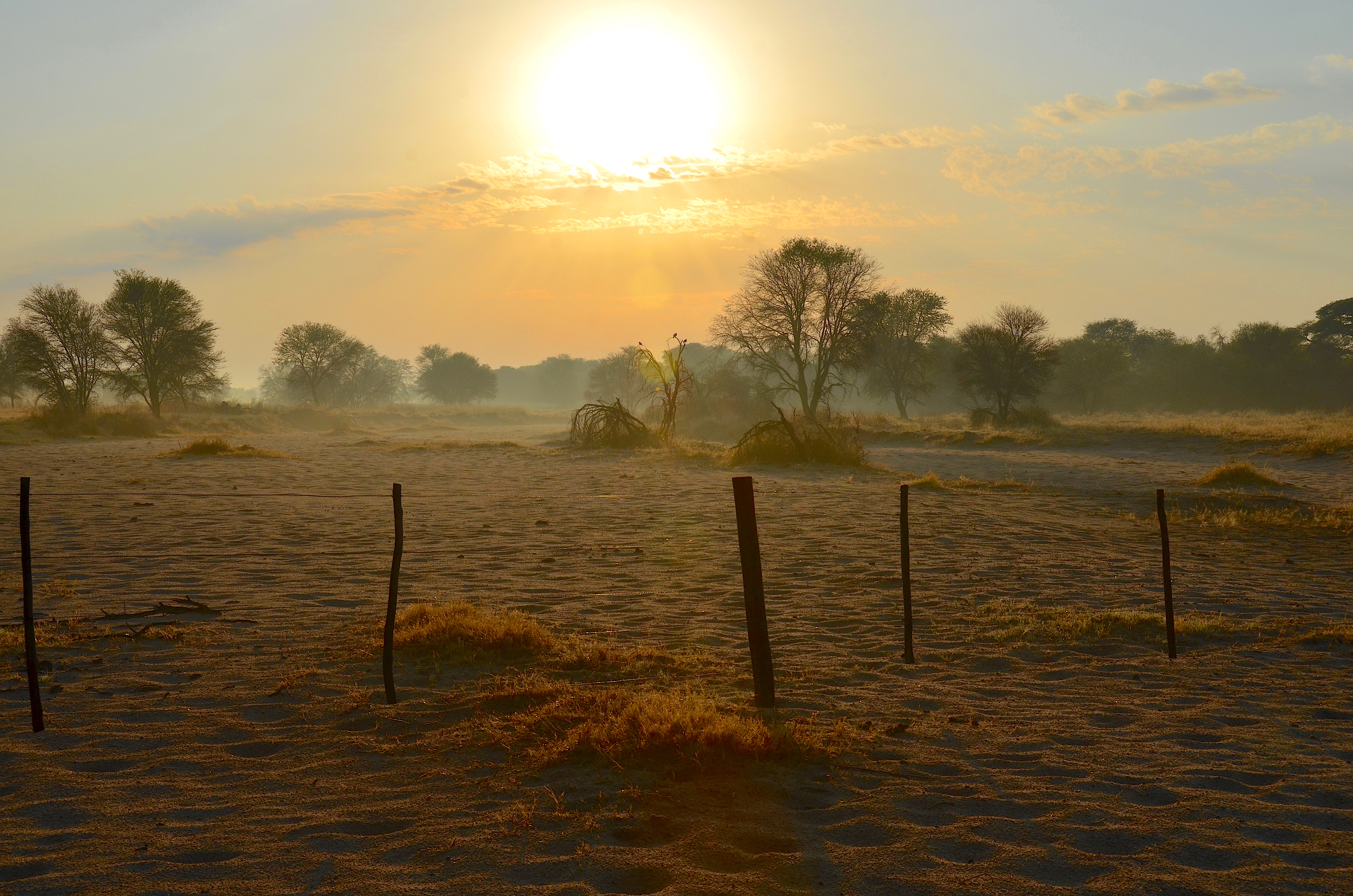
Morning on a farm in Namibia, just after sunrise

Morning is either the period from sunrise to noon, or the period from midnight to noon. In the first definition it is preceded by the twilight period of dawn, and there are no exact times for when morning begins (also true of evening and night) because it can vary according to one's latitude, and the hours of daytime at each time of year. However, morning strictly ends at noon, when afternoon starts.

Morning precedes afternoon, evening, and night in the sequence of a day. Originally, the term referred to sunrise.

== Etymology ==
The Late Modern English words morning and tomorrow began in Early Middle English as morwening, developing into morwen, then morwe, and eventually morrow. English, unlike some other languages, has separate terms for morning and tomorrow, despite their common root. Other languages, like Dutch, Scots and German, may use a single word – morgen – to signify both morning and tomorrow.

== Significance ==
=== Cultural significance ===
Some languages that use the time of day in greeting have a special greeting for morning, such as the English good morning. The appropriate time to use such greetings, such as whether it may be used between midnight and dawn, depends on the culture's or speaker's concept of morning.

In polytheistic traditions, there are various dawn deities that are associated with dawn and the morning. In ancient Greek mythology, Eos was the Titan goddess of dawn who opened the gates of heaven each morning to prestage the arrival of her brother, Helios, the Sun. The Roman equivalent was Aurora. For the ancient Egyptians, Khepri was the scarab-faced god of the morning Sun and rebirth. In Hinduism during the Vedic period, the dawn deity was Ushas.

Morning prayer is a common practice in different religions. The morning period includes specific phases of the Liturgy of the Hours of Christianity.

=== Astronomy ===
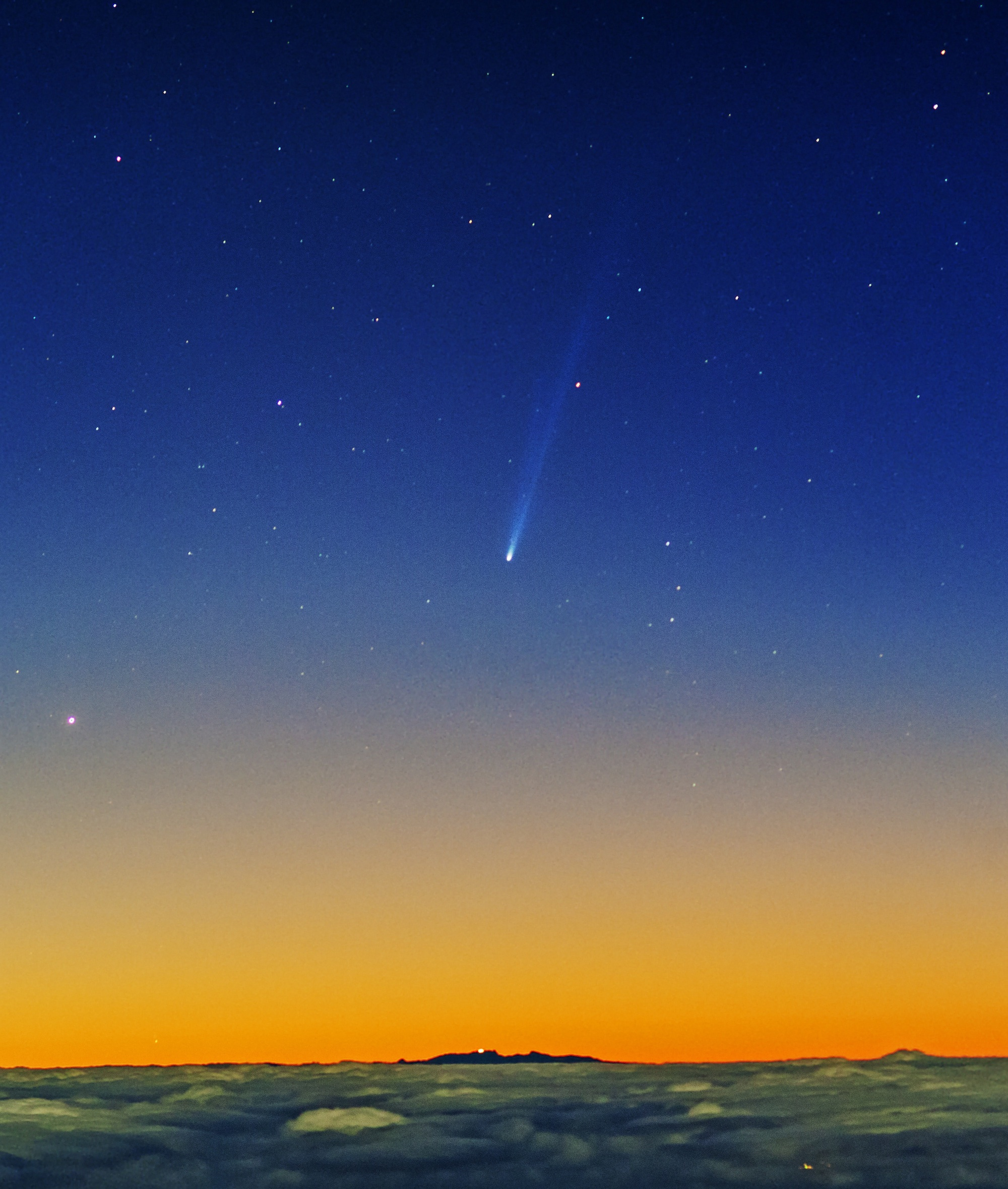
Comet Ison at dawn, with Mercury at left

When a star first appears in the east just prior to sunrise, it is referred to as a heliacal rising. Despite the less favorable lighting conditions for optical astronomy, dawn and morning can be useful for observing objects orbiting close to the Sun. Morning (and evening) serves as the optimum time period for viewing the inferior planets Venus and Mercury. Venus and sometimes Mercury may be referred to as a morning star when they appear in the east prior to sunrise. It is a popular time to hunt for comets, as their tails grow more prominent as these objects draw closer to the Sun. The morning (and evening) twilight is used to search for near-Earth asteroids that orbit inside the orbit of the Earth. In mid-latitudes, the mornings near the autumnal equinox are a favorable time period for viewing the zodiacal light.

On the Earth, the Sun is seen to rise in the east during the morning. However, this is not always true for other planets. On Venus, the retrograde rotation with respect to the orbit means that the morning Sun would rise in the west. For Mercury, when the planet is near perihelion the Sun can move in a retrograde manner, so during this period it can rise in the west.

=== Genetics ===
For people, the morning period may be a period of enhanced or reduced energy and productivity. The ability of a person to wake up effectively in the morning may be influenced by a gene called "Period 3". This gene comes in two forms, a "long" and a "short" variant. It seems to affect the person's preference for mornings or evenings. People who carry the long variant were over-represented as morning people, while the ones carrying the short variant were evening preference people.

== See also ==
- Crepuscular – animals that are active primarily in the early morning and the evening
- Morning Glory cloud – a low roll cloud that typically forms in the morning
