= Autumn (disambiguation) =

Autumn is one of the four temperate seasons.

Autumn may also refer to:

== Film ==
- Autumn (1930 film), an animated Disney Silly Symphony short
- Autumn (1990 film), an Estonian film starring Kaljo Kiisk
- Autumn (2008 film) or Sonbahar, a film by Özcan Alper
- Autumn (2009 film), a zombie film based on the book by David Moody
- Autumn (2010 film) or Harud

== Literature ==
- Autumn (Knausgård book), a 2017 book of essays by Karl Ove Knausgård
- Autumn (novel), a 2016 novel by Ali Smith
- Autumn (play), a 1937 British play by Margaret Kennedy and Gregory Ratoff
- Autumn, a 1916 poem by Bliss Carman
- Autumn, a 2001 zombie novel by David Moody

== Music ==
- Autumn Records, a 1960s pop label based in California
- Autumn (rapper), American rapper

=== Groups ===
- Autumn (Dutch band), a Dutch gothic metal group
- Autumn (Australian band)
- The Autumns, an American indie rock band

=== Classical music ===
- Autumn (concerto), a concerto from Vivaldi's The Four Seasons
- In Autumn (Grieg), a concert overture

=== Albums ===
- The Autumns (album), a 2004 album by The Autumns
- Autumn (Don Ellis album) (1968)
- Autumn (George Winston album) (1980)
- Autumn (EP), a 2002 EP by Subtle

=== Songs ===
- "Autumn" (Strawbs song), 1974
- "Autumn" (Ben&Ben song), 2023
- "Autumn", a 1972 song by the Edgar Winter Group from They Only Come Out at Night
- "Autumn", a 1982 song by Level 42 from Strategy
- "Autumn", a 2010 song by Joanna Newsom from Have One on Me
- "Autumn", a song from the 1997 musical Titanic

== People ==
- Autumn (given name), a feminine given name
- Autumn (rapper), American rapper
- Emilie Autumn (born 1979), American singer and violinist

== See also ==
- The Autumn of the Patriarch, a 1975 novel by Gabriel García Márquez
- Autumnal equinox (disambiguation)
- Jennifer Blake (wrestler) (born 1983), also known by her ring-name Autumn Frost
- Fall (disambiguation)
- Forever Autumn (disambiguation)
- "To Autumn", an 1819 poem by John Keats
