= Equinox Publishing =

Equinox Publishing may refer to:

- Equinox Publishing (Jakarta), a publisher of books on Indonesia
- Equinox Publishing (Sheffield), an independent academic publisher based in Sheffield
