= Winter solstice (disambiguation) =

Winter solstice is an astronomical phenomenon which marks the shortest day and the longest night of the year.

The winter solstice may be referred to as:

- December solstice in the Northern Hemisphere
- June solstice in the Southern Hemisphere

Winter solstice may also refer to:

- Winter Solstice (film), 2004 American film with Anthony LaPaglia
- Winter Solstice: North (album), a 1999 album by British experimental music group Coil
- Winter Solstice, a 2000 novel by Rosamunde Pilcher
- Winter Solstice, a two-part German-produced TV film from 2003 based on the novel with Sinéad Cusack and Peter Ustinov
- "Winter Solstice", a song by Phoenix from Alpha Zulu, 2022
- Dongzhi (solar term), the 22nd solar term and a traditional Chinese festival

== See also ==
- Midwinter (disambiguation)
- Winter (disambiguation)
- Solstice (disambiguation)
- Summer solstice (disambiguation)
- Spring equinox (disambiguation)
- Autumnal equinox (disambiguation)
