= Soulstice =

Soulstice may refer to:

- Soulstice (band), an American electronica/dance band
- Soulstice (video game), a 2022 hack and slash video game
- Soulstice (album), a 2006 album by Shapeshifter
- SoulStice, an American hip-hop artist

== See also ==
- Solstice (disambiguation)
