= Charles Hug =

Swiss painter, draftsman and book illustrator

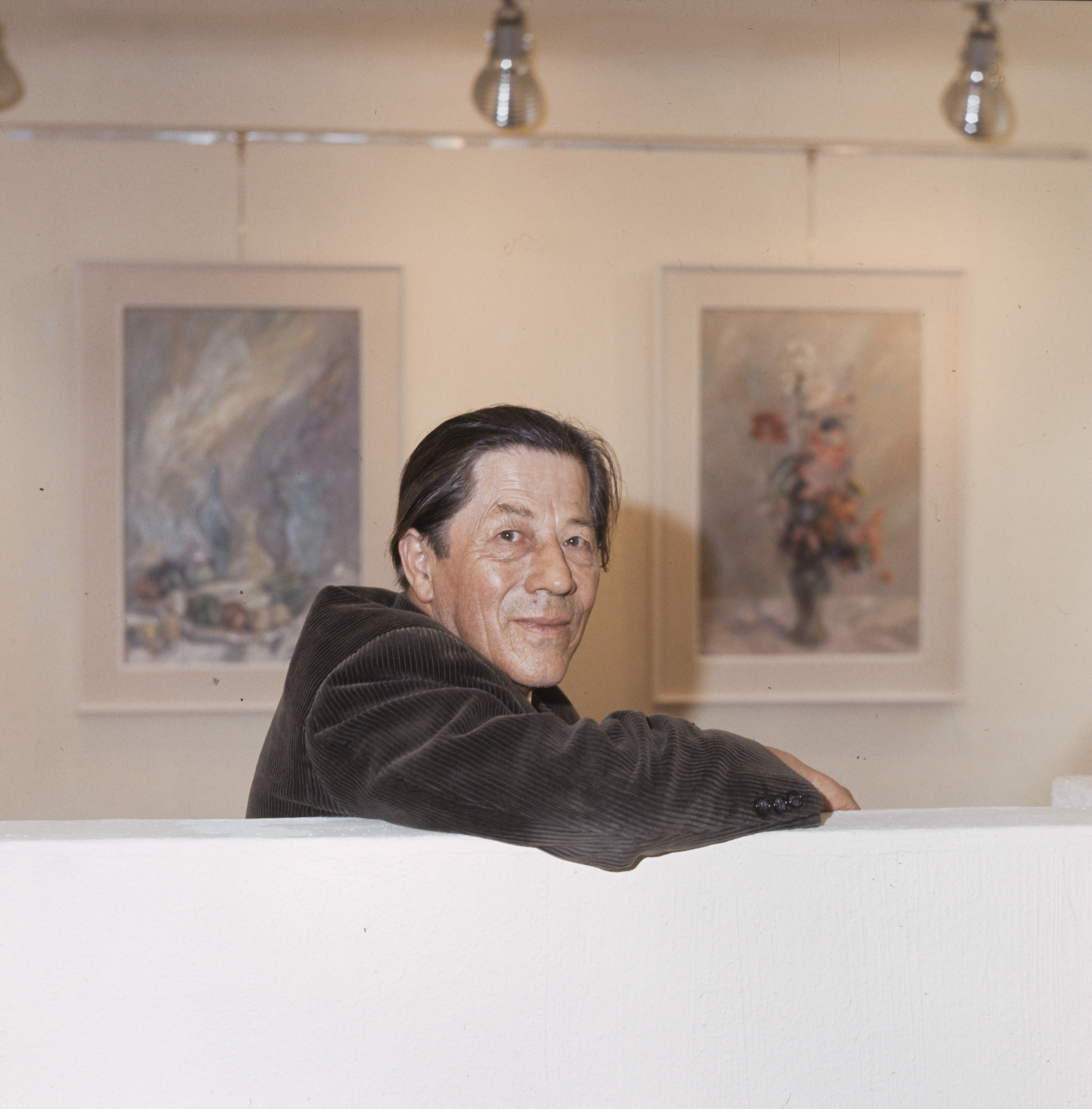
Karl Hug

Karl Hug (22 June 1899 – 7 May 1979), known as Charles Hug, was a Swiss painter, draftsman and book illustrator.

== Biography ==
Karl Hug was born on 22 June 1899 in St. Gallen. He spent his childhood and youth in St. Gallen. After school, he had to start a mechanical engineering apprenticeship in a printing company, which he broke off after a year. He earned his living as a construction worker and attended evening classes at the business school, first in the structural engineering, later in the decorative department. From 1920, Hug worked as a typographer in Geneva.

In 1923, Hug moved to Berlin and attended evening classes in the private school of Arthur Lewin-Funcke, and at Lessing University. He studied with local teachers Käthe Kollwitz and Max Liebermann, who supported him with letters of recommendation, but was also influenced by Karl Walser and Lovis Corinth.

With his partner Amrey Balsiger (1909-1999), the daughter of Menton Moser, Hug first went to Arles for some time in 1927, where he worked with Max Hunziker. Charles Hug and Amrey Balsiger split in 1931 after she met the German-Dutch painter Herbert Fiedler (1891-1962), whom she married in 1938.

In 1932, Hug made the acquaintance of the St. Gallen violinist Renée-Elisabeth Walz (1909–1979) and conducted an intensive correspondence with her. In 1934, he returned to Switzerland. After the marriage in the same year, they took up residence in winter in Zürich and in summer in Greifenstein-Staad near Rorschach, an old farmhouse with a large garden and a view of Lake Constance. He continued to participate in international exhibitions with his drawings, portraits and landscape paintings (Brussels, Tokyo, Paris), but now focused in his work on fruit and flower still lifes and landscapes and devoted himself increasingly to his drawing and illustrations. For his illustrations to Conrad Ferdinand Meyer's The Shot of the Pulpit and Gottfried Keller's The Governor of Greifensee he received in 1938 and 1939 awards from the Gottfried Keller and the C. F. Meyer Foundation.

He died on 7 May 1979 in Zürich.
