= Spring equinox =

Spring equinox or vernal equinox or variations may refer to:

- March equinox, the spring equinox in the Northern Hemisphere
- September equinox, the spring equinox in the Southern Hemisphere

== Other uses ==
- Nowruz, Persian/Iranian new year which begins on the spring equinox (March equinox)
- Vernal Equinox Day, a holiday in Japan (in March)
- Spring Equinox: Moon's Milk or Under an Unquiet Skull, a 1998 EP by Coil
- Vernal Equinox (album), by Jon Hassell, 1977
- "Vernal Equinox", a song by Can from the 1975 album Landed

== See also ==
- Equinox (disambiguation)
- Equinox (celestial coordinates)
- Autumnal equinox (disambiguation)
- Winter solstice (disambiguation)
- Summer solstice (disambiguation)
