= Equinox Day =

Equinox Day may refer to:

- The day the equinox falls upon.
- Autumnal Equinox Day (September in Japan)
- Vernal Equinox Day (March in Japan)

== See also ==
- Equinox (disambiguation)
