= Equinoxe TV =

Cameroon-based television station

- Country of origin: Cameroon
- Original language: French

Production
- Production location: Douala

Equinoxe is a Cameroon-based television station. Soon after its launch, it became one of the most vocal critics of Paul Biya's regime.

The station was notorious for showing live footage of political demonstration against constitutional change in Cameroon which favoured president Biya's stay in power after 2011 when he is constitutionally barred from running for office again. The station was suspended from broadcast in January 2008 provoking widespread protest in Douala where it is based. It is even believed that it suspension was one of the remote causes of the February general strike in Cameroon against rising food prices, the cost of fuel and constitutional amendment which left over one hundred people dead (40 in official estimates) and state and private property worth millions of dollars damaged. The station has a myriad of interesting political programmes, one of which is the popular 'Droit De Reponse' aired every Sunday from 12:00 currently moderated by journalist Sandrine Yamga. The TV is owned by business mogul from the West Region of Cameroon, Severin Tchounke, who also owns a critical Daily newspaper, La Nouvelle Expression. some journalists currently working for the TV station include, Herve, K, Vivian Kamwa, Nfor Hanson, Jack Ekwe Kingue, Sandrine Yanga, Julie Ngue, Chris Thobie, Roland Akong, Marcelin Ngansop, Cedric Noufele, Serge Alain Ottou, among others.

As of 2020, two surveys by Médiametrie and Kantar Media revealed that it was the most watched television channel in Cameroon, ahead of TV Novelas and TV5MONDE.
