= Midvinterblot (disambiguation) =

Midvinterblot is the 1915 painting by Carl Larsson

Midvinterblot may also refer to:

- Midvinterblots, ancient ceremony associated with Swedish Jul (Yule) tradition
- Midvinterblot (album), a 2006 album by Swedish band Unleashed
