= Central European Midsummer Time =

Time in Europe: Light Blue / Western European Time / Greenwich Mean Time (UTC); Blue / Western European Time / Greenwich Mean Time (UTC); Blue / Western European Summer Time / British Summer Time / Irish Standard Time (UTC+1); Red / Central European Time (UTC+1); Red / Central European Summer Time (UTC+2); Yellow / Eastern European Time / Kaliningrad Time (UTC+2); Ochre / Eastern European Time (UTC+2); Ochre / Eastern European Summer Time (UTC+3); Green / Moscow Time / Turkey Time (UTC+3); Turquoise / Armenia Time / Azerbaijan Time / Georgia Time / Samara Time (UTC+4); ▉▉▉▉ Pale hues: Standard time observed all year ▉▉▉ Dark hues: Daylight saving time

Central European Midsummer Time (CEMT) was a time zone three hours ahead of GMT, used as a double summer time in several European countries during the 1940s.

== Usage ==
=== France ===
Some parts of France, but not Paris, observed Central European Midsummer Time in 1941–1945.

=== Germany ===
Central European Midsummer Time was used in occupied Germany from 11 May, 03:00 CEST to 29 June 1947, 03:00 CEMT.

According to GHEP, Berlin and the Soviet Occupation Zone observed midsummer time from 24 May 1945, 02:00 CET to 24 September 1945, 03:00 CEMT. Midsummer time was equivalent to Moscow Time, which did not observe DST then.

== See also ==
- Time in Germany
- UTC+03:00
- Other countries and territories in UTC+3 time zone
