= Equinox Marathon =

Annual marathon held in Fairbanks, Alaska

- Equinox Marathon Logo
- Date: the third or fourth Saturday of September
- Location: Fairbanks, Alaska
- Event type: Trail / Road
- Distance: 26.2 miles (42.195 km)
- Established: 1963
- Course records: Men: 2:38:14 (2019); Aaron Fletcher; Women: 3:07:22 (2021); Anna Dalton
- Website: equinoxmarathon.org

The Equinox Marathon is an annual marathon held in Fairbanks, Alaska near the time of the autumnal equinox. It is one of the most difficult marathon courses in the world and includes 3285 ft. (1001 m) of elevation gain (and loss).

== History ==
The marathon was started in 1964 by members of the University of Alaska Fairbanks community. The inaugural event had 143 entrants and 69 finishers, with the majority of entrants (and plurality of finishers) being women.

During the late 1960s, the marathon was the largest marathon in the world, thrice.

The 2020 edition of the race was cancelled due to the coronavirus pandemic.

== The Marathon Course ==
The course begins at the University of Alaska Fairbanks and primarily follows trails and dirt roads past the summit of Ester Dome (elevation 2323 ft.), then returns to the summit and drops to Henderson Rd. From there, the course follows Henderson and Gold Hill Roads back to the university campus. In 2012 the course was modified slightly to include additional sections of trail and less road running. A new section of single-track trail was constructed from the base of Ester Dome Road ascending to the point where the old trail leaves the road. The men's course record of 2:38:14 was set in 2019 by Aaron Fletcher, breaking the long-standing previous record of 2:41:30 set in 1984 by Stan Justice. The women's record of 3:07:22 was set in 2021 by Anna Dalton, breaking the previous record of 3:15:06 that was held by seven time champion Christy Marvin.

In 2023 a nonbinary division was added.

== Equinox Relay ==
The Equinox Relay is run concomitantly with the marathon along the same course by teams of three people. Exchange zones are located at mile 8.4 and mile 17. The relay was added in 1995 and run through 2019. It will be recontinued in 2024, after a hiatus due to COVID-19 related logistic complications.

== Equinox Ultramarathon ==
The ultramarathon event was added in 2009. In 2009 and 2010 the course was 50 km in length, following the marathon course until just past mile 25, then turning north to follow the Skarland Trail in a clockwise direction until connecting with the regular marathon course just past mile 2. From there the course returned to the start by following the marathon course in reverse direction.

In 2011 the course was extended to approximately 40 miles in length. The course follows the marathon course for the first 20 miles to Henderson Road. It then descends following St. Patrick's Road, regaining the marathon course at the base of Ester Dome at approximately mile 9. The course then follows the marathon course in reverse to approximately mile 3.5, from where it diverges in an out-and-back to the east climbing to the KUAC radio tower and back. The course then resumes following the marathon course in reverse until approximately mile 2, from where the course then follows the Skarland Trail in counter-clockwise direction until it regains the marathon course just past mile 25. It then follows the marathon course to the finish.

On May 20, 2016 an announcement that the ultramarathon event would be eliminated was published on the Equinox Marathon Facebook page.

== Equinox Half Marathon ==
The half marathon event was added in 2021, to substitute for the relay, and discontinued after 2023. The half marathon course followed the marathon course for the first ~8.5 miles (Ester Dome Road), where it turned around and followed Sheep Creek Road back towards UAF until it rejoined the marathon course around mile 25. The half marathon course had a total of 1035 ft of elevation gain and loss.
