= Arthur Lewin-Funcke =

German sculptor and medallist

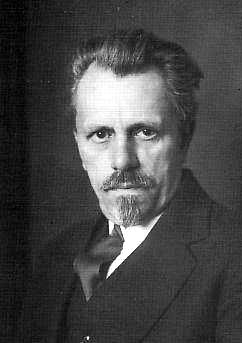
Arthur Lewin-Funcke (date unknown)

Arthur Lewin-Funcke, originally Arthur Levin (9 November 1866, Dresden - 16 October 1937, Berlin) was a German sculptor and medallist. Lewin was his father's name, and Funcke his mother's maiden name.

== Life and work ==
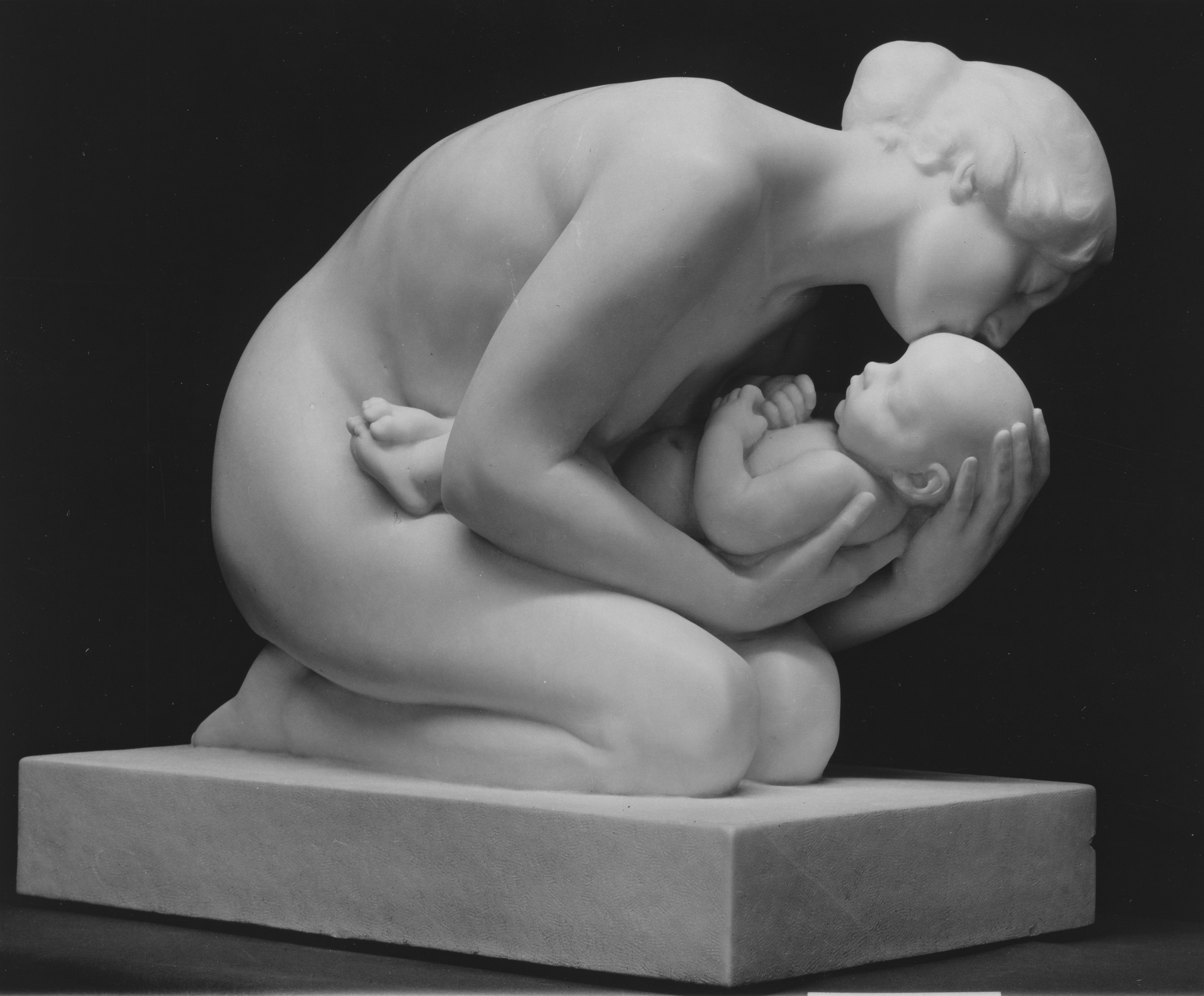
The Mother (Metropolitan Museum of Art)

After completing an apprenticeship as an ivory carver, he attended the Handwerkerschule (arts & crafts school) in Berlin. From 1890 to 1895, he studied at the Prussian Academy of Arts with Ernst Herter, Gerhard Janensch and Albert Wolff, among others. From 1895 to 1897, he lived and worked at the Villa Strohl-Fern in Rome, then went to the Académie Julian in Paris to complete his studies with Denys Puech. It was then that he began officially calling himself "Lewin-Funcke"; feeling that Levin was too common.

In 1901, he founded the Studienateliers für Malerei und Plastik (painting and sculpture school) in Berlin. He had many students who became well known, including Paul Citroen, David Friedmann, Charles Hug, Käthe and Peter Kollwitz and Felix Nussbaum. In 1903, he married Eva Elisabeth Poenitz, a daughter of the composer, Franz Poenitz. They had four children, including the painter, Andreas Funcke (1909-1941).

He received a gold medal at the Großen Berliner Kunstausstellung of 1905, and was named a Professor in 1913. The blind were a central theme of his work in the 1920s. Some of his works depicting children were used as models for toys, notably by the doll makers, Kämmer & Reinhardt.

Most of his works were nude figures, but he also created busts. Much of his ironwork was lost or stolen during World War II, and is presumed to have been melted down for war materiel. This can be verified in the case of a group, depicting Martin Luther and some associates, that stood in front of the parish hall in Berlin-Zehlendorf. In 1943, it was officially declared a "Metallspende des deutschen Volkes" (metal donation of the German people) and dismantled. A bronze lion, in front of the artillery barracks in Eberswalde, was probably put to use on the spot.

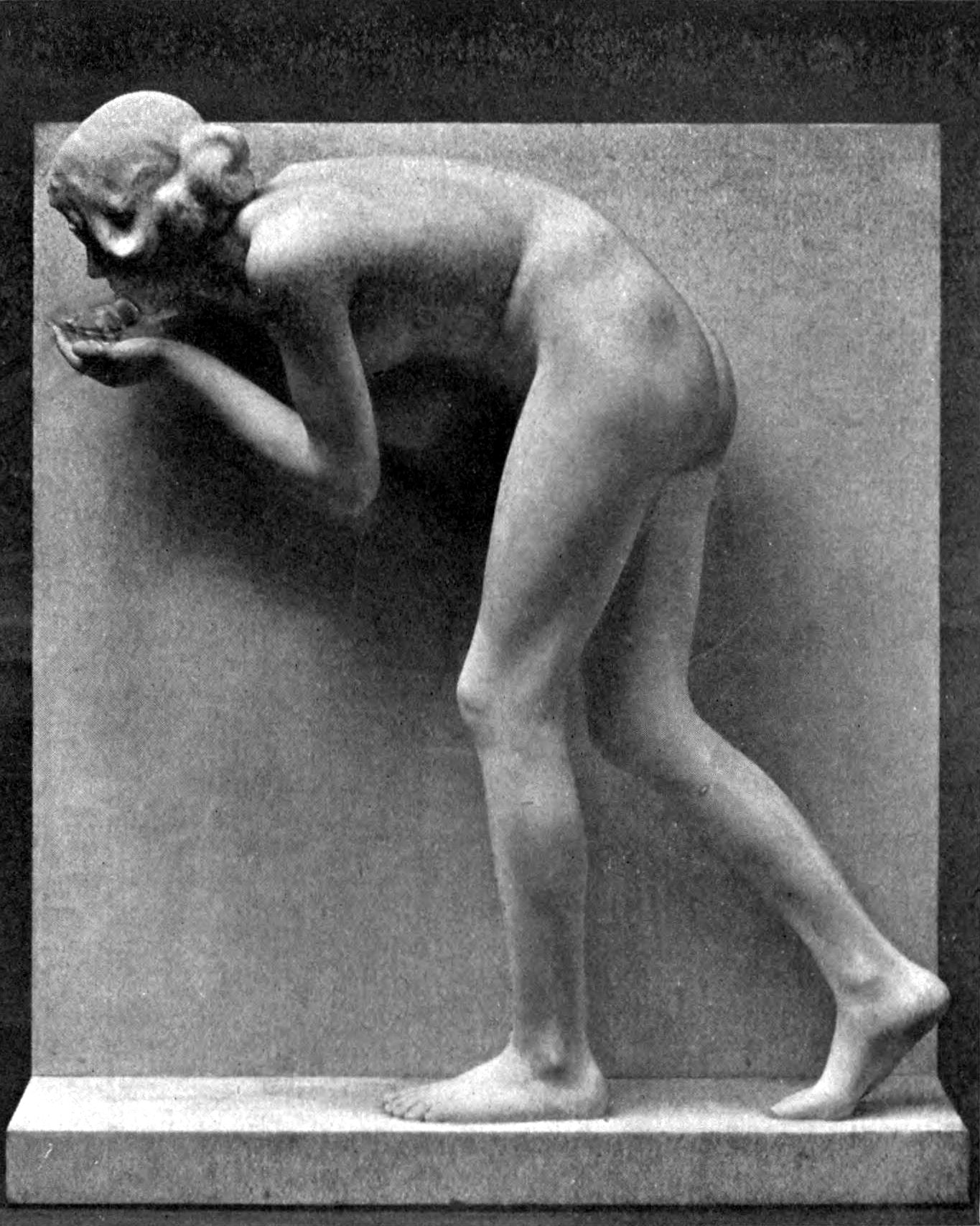
At the Spring
