= Midsummer Night (TV series) =

2024 Norwegian television series directed by Per-Olav Sørensen

- Promotional poster
- Directed by: Per-Olav Sørensen
- Starring: Pernilla August; Dennis Storhøi; Christopher Wollter
- Country of origin: Norway
- Original language: Norwegian
- No. of seasons: 1
- No. of episodes: 5

Original release
- Release: 11 April 2024

Midsummer Night is a Norwegian television series by Netflix. The series premiered on 11 April 2024 on Netflix. It is co-written and directed by Per-Olav Sørensen. It stars Pernilla August, Dennis Storhøi and Christopher Wollter. It was produced by The Global Ensemble Drama.

== Plot ==
During a midsummer party, Carina (Pernilla August) and Johannes (Dennis Storhøi) choose to reveal a big secret to their family and friends; it sets off a chain of unforeseen consequences.

== Cast ==
- Pernilla August as Carina
- Dennis Storhøi as Johannes
- Christopher Wollter as Hakan
- Kadir Talabani as Tabur
