= Summer Solstice (2023 film) =

2023 American film

Summer Solstice is a 2023 film directed by Noah Schamus. It is described by Variety as a “Queer Buddy Comedy.”
