= Midsummer Night (painting) =

Painting by Nikolai Astrup

Bonfire celebrating Midsummer Night
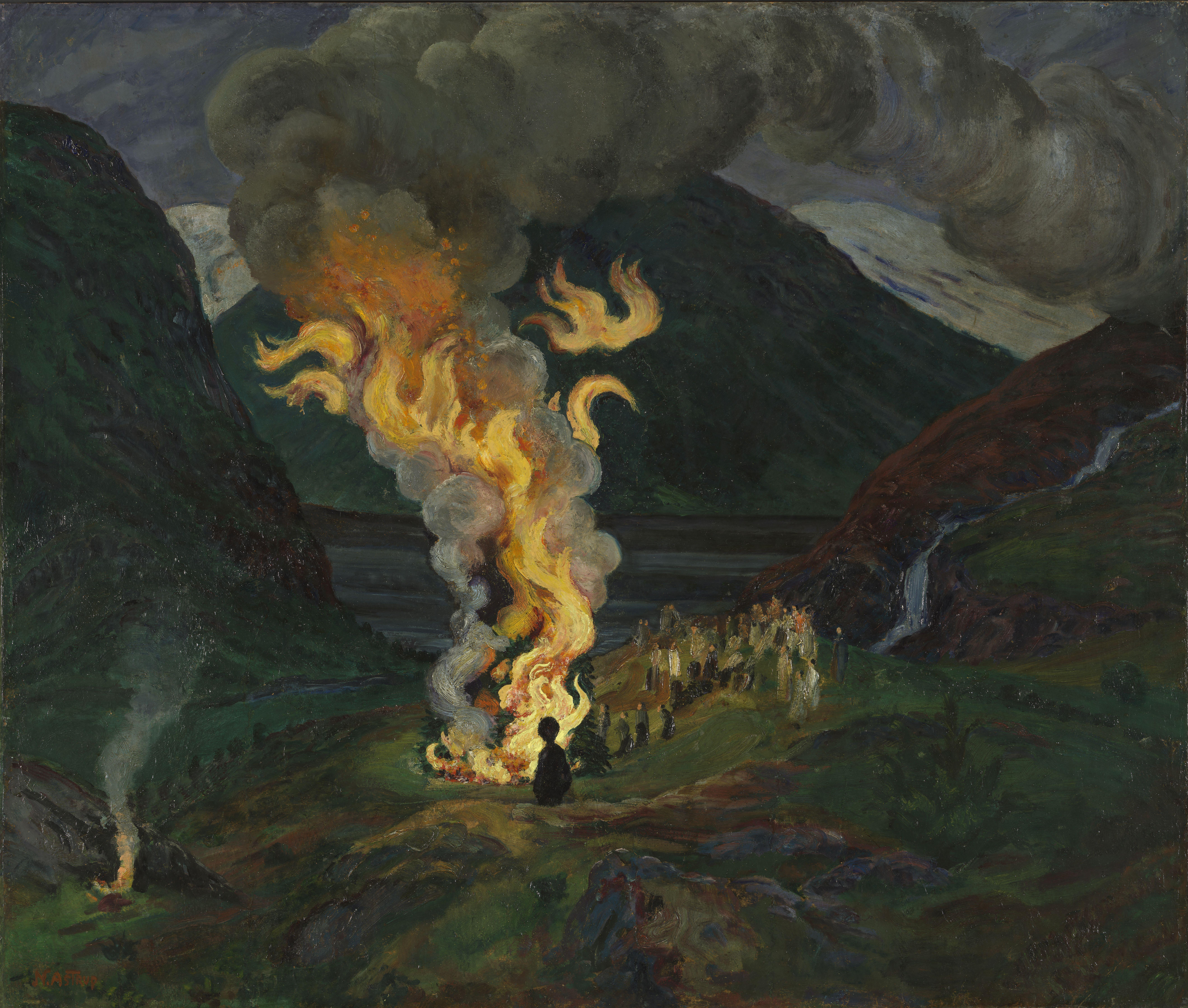
- Year: completed 1926
- Medium: paper
- Dimensions: 89 cm (35 in) × 105 cm (41 in)
- Accession no.: NG.M.03609

Midsummer Night (Norwegian: Jonsokbål) is an oil on paper painting by the Norwegian artist Nikolai Astrup. It shows the traditional bonfire for Saint John's Eve — sometimes referred to as Midsummer Night - in a valley in Jølster Municipality in Norway, the artist's hometown, to which he had returned in 1902. It was begun in 1912 and completed in 1926. It has been in the National Gallery of Norway since 1984.
