= Forever Autumn =

Forever Autumn may refer to:

- Forever Autumn (album), an album by Lake of Tears, or the title song
- "Forever Autumn" (song), a song by Jeff Wayne, Gary Osborne and Paul Vigrass
- Forever Autumn (novel), a novel by Mark Morris based on the TV series Doctor Who
