= Midwinter (surname) =

Midwinter is a surname. Notable people with the surname include:

- Billy Midwinter (1851–1890), English and Australian cricketer
- Brian Midwinter, judge in Manitoba, Canada
- Eric Midwinter (born 1932), British educator and writer
- James Robert Midwinter (1929–2017), Canadian ambassador to Venezuela 1983–1985, inspector general of the foreign service 1979–1983
- William Robinson Midwinter (1885–1966), founder of British ceramics company Midwinter Pottery
