= Autumnal equinox =

Autumnal equinox or variations, may refer to:

- September equinox, the autumnal equinox in the Northern Hemisphere
- March equinox, the autumnal equinox in the Southern Hemisphere

== Other uses ==
- Autumnal Equinox Day (Japanese: 秋分の日, Shūbun no Hi), a public holiday in September in Japan
- Autumn Equinox: Amethyst Deceivers, a 1998 record by Coil
- "An Autumnal Equinox", a song from The Caretaker's 2016 album Everywhere at the End of Time - Stage 1

== See also ==
- Equinox (disambiguation)
- Autumn (disambiguation)
- Winter solstice (disambiguation)
- Summer solstice (disambiguation)
- Spring equinox (disambiguation)
