= Equinox (MLM) =

Shutdown pyramid scheme

- Industry: Multi-level marketing
- Founded: 1991; 35 years ago
- Founder: Bill Gouldd
- Defunct: 2001; 25 years ago
- Headquarters: Las Vegas, United States

Equinox International was a multi-level marketing company founded in 1991 and headed by Bill Gouldd. In 1996, Equinox was listed #1 on Inc Magazine's list of the 500 fastest-growing private companies in the United States.

The company and its founder came under scrutiny for its business practices; starting in 1997, investors, the FTC, and several states brought suit charging Equinox was an illegal pyramid scheme rather than a legitimate business.

On 25 April 2000, the Federal Trade Commission issued a notice that Equinox International settled a court case with a penalty of $40 million in restitution. Gouldd was required to surrender substantial holdings, but retained (among other things) over a million dollars' worth of real estate.

Equinox International was ordered dissolved in April 2000. As part of the settlement, Gouldd was also "permanently restrained and enjoined from engaging, participating or assisting in any multi-level marketing program."
