= Equinox Publishing (Jakarta) =

Publishing company of Indonesia

Equinox Publishing is a Jakarta-based publisher of books.

== History ==
Equinox was launched on the vernal equinox, 21 March 2000 at the Shangri-La Hotel in Jakarta. Its aim was to publish "fiction, non-fiction, and luxury illustrated and specially-commissioned works". Its first book was a coffee-table book, KRETEK: The Culture and Heritage of Indonesia's Clove Cigarettes by Mark Hanusz.

The firm has also published three works by Indonesia's renowned fiction writer, Pramoedya Ananta Toer.

On 21 March 2007, Equinox Publishing released a series of out-of-print books using print on demand technology. Two of these titles were related to the rise of the Communist movement in Indonesia, and were blocked by Indonesia's Department of Customs and Excise. However, during the launch, Indonesian Attorney General Abdul Rahman Saleh gave the publisher verbal permission for the books to be distributed in Indonesia.
