= Solstice (disambiguation) =

A solstice is a bi-annual astronomical event, when the Sun's apparent position in the sky reaches its northernmost or southernmost extremes.

Solstice may also refer to:

== Film ==
- Solstice (film), a 2008 thriller film
- Solstice, a 1968 film produced and edited by Edward Summer

== Video games ==
- Solstice (1990 video game), a puzzle game released for the Nintendo Entertainment System
- Solstice (2016 video game), a fantasy/mystery visual novel
- Solstice, an expansion to the puzzle game OneShot

== Music ==
- Solstice (doom metal band), a British epic doom metal band
- Solstice (progressive rock band), a British neo-prog band
- Solstice (death metal band), an American death metal band
- Solstice (album), 1975 album by Ralph Towner
- "Solstice", a 2011 song by Björk from Biophilia
- "Solstice", a 2016 song by If These Trees Could Talk, opening song from the album The Bones of a Dying World

== Other uses ==
- Operation Solstice, a German armoured offensive operation on the Eastern Front of World War II
- Pontiac Solstice, a General Motors vehicle
- Solstice (character), a DC Comics superheroine and member of the Teen Titans
- Solstice (novel), a novel by Joyce Carol Oates
- Solstice Advanced Materials, an American company spun off from Honeywell in 2025
- Solstice DiskSuite, former name of Solaris Volume Manager, RAID software
- Solstice Media, an Australian online publisher

== See also ==
- Soulstice (disambiguation)
- Celebrity Solstice, a cruise ship
