= Death in June discography =

Death in June have a discography beginning in 1981, including compilations of older material mixed with (then) newer, singles, limited editions and multiple versions of a single releases.

== Studio albums ==
- The Guilty Have No Pride (6 June 1983)
- Burial (15 September 1984)
- Nada! (12 October 1985)
- The World That Summer (22 July 1986)
- Brown Book (30 June 1987)
- The Wall of Sacrifice (March 1989)
- But, What Ends When the Symbols Shatter? (25 August 1992)
- Rose Clouds of Holocaust (20 May 1995)
- Take Care & Control (1 January 1998)
- Operation Hummingbird (13 June 2000)
- All Pigs Must Die (23 November 2001)
- The Rule of Thirds (18 March 2008)
- Peaceful Snow/Lounge Corps (9 November 2010)
- The Snow Bunker Tapes (13 March 2013)
- Essence! (30 November 2018)
- NADA-IZED! (13 December 2022)

== Collaborative albums ==
- Östenbräun (1989) - Death in June & Les Joyaux de la Princesse
- Death in June Presents: Occidental Martyr (30 November 1995) - Death in June & Max Wearing
- Death in June Presents: KAPO! (6 June 1996) - Death in June & Richard Leviathan
- Scorpion Wind: Heaven Sent (24 July 1996) - Death in June with Boyd Rice and John Murphy (Scorpion Wind)
- Alarm Agents (29 October 2004) - Death in June & Boyd Rice
- Free Tibet (3 September 2006) - Death in June & David Tibet (MP3 release only via official website)

== Compilation albums ==
Year	Title	Format, Special Notes
1986	Lesson 1: Misanthropy	LP, material from 1981 to 1984
1989	93 Dead Sunwheels	12″, CD, material from 1984 to 1987
1989	The Corn Years	CD, material from 1986 to 1988
1990	1888	split 12″ with Current 93, includes material from 1986 to 1990
1991	The Cathedral of Tears	CD, material from 1986 to 1988
1997	DISCriminate	2×CD, material from 1981 to 1997
2005	Abandon Tracks!	2×LP, CD, reinterpretations, remixes, rarities

== Live albums ==
Year	Title	Format, Special Notes
1987	Oh How We Laughed	LP, CD, live recording from 1982
1991	Night and Fog	LP, CD, live recording from 1984
1991	Frankfurt Sound Depot	CD, includes live recording from 1991
1993	Something is Coming	2×LP, 2×CD, live recording from 1992
1999	Heilige!	CD, live recording from 1999
2008	Black Angel – Live!	LP, CD limited to 2000 copies
2011	Live in Wien	2xCD limited to 2000 copies
2013	Live At The Edge Of The World	2xLP, CD, live recording from 2011

== Singles ==
- "Heaven Street" (1981)
- "State Laughter" (1982)
- "She Said Destroy" (1984)
- "Born Again" (1985)
- "Come Before Christ and Murder Love" (1985)
- "To Drown a Rose" (1987)
- "Paradise Rising" (1992)
- "Cathedral of Tears" (1993)
- "Sun Dogs" (1994)
- "Black Whole of Love" (1995)
- "Kameradschaft" (1998)
- "Passion! Power!! Purge!!!" (1998)
- "We Said Destroy" (2000)
- "Peaceful Snow" (2010)

== Compilation appearances ==
Year	Title	Format, Special Notes
1983	New Horizons	Tape
1983	The Angels are Coming	2xTape
1984	From Torture to Conscience	LP, compilation includes non-album material
1996	Sacred War	CD
1994	Im Blutfeuer	CD, compilation includes non-album material
1996	Terra Serpentes	CD
1996	The Pact: Flying in the Face...	CD, compilation includes non-album material
1996	Riefenstahl	2×CD, compilation includes non-album material
1998	Thorak	2×CD, compilation includes non-album material
1999	Der Tod im Juni	CD, compilation includes non-album material
1999	Hate People Like Us	CD
1999	The Torture Garden	CD
2002	Fire Danger Season	4xCD
2003	Steelnights	4×CD, includes live recording from 2001
2005	Looking for Europe	4xCD, 4xCD+Book
2006	Forseti Lebt	CD

== Videos ==
Year	Title	Format, Special Notes
2004	Live in Italy	VHS, DVD, live in Italy 1999
2005	Behind the Mask	DVD, documentary and interview with Douglas P.
2006	The Guilty Have No Pride	CD + DVD, live in London 1982
2006	Live in New York	DVD, live in New York 2002

== Tributes ==
Year	Title	Format, Special Notes
1995	Reaping Time	Tape
1995	Heilige Tod	CD
2002	Taciturne: Tod im Juli	CDR
2008	Down in June: Covers...	CD

== Acting ==
- Pearls Before Swine (1999)
- Vignettes, released via MatureAussieNetwork (2006)
- End of The Road released via MatureAussieNetwork (2006)
