= Abandon Tracks =

Studio album by Death in June
- Released: 26 July, 2005
- Genre: Neofolk
- Length: 70:47
- Language: English
- Label: New European Recordings
- Producer: Douglas P.

Death in June chronology
Alarm Agents (2004)	Abandon Tracks (2005)	Free Tibet (2006)

Abandon Tracks, also written as Abandon Tracks!, is a 2005 compilation album by the English neofolk band Death in June. The album was released through the record label New European Recordings.

== Background ==
According to the music journal Compulsion, Abandon Tracks features several unreleased recordings, as well as compilation songs from other European bands including Nature and Organisation (My Black Diary) and Der Blutharsch (Many Enemies Bring Much Honor) among others. The album also features several re-recordings of earlier songs by Douglas P. which were originally sung by David Tibet and Nikolas Schreck.

According to the official Death in June band archive, the cover art of the album features the regionally famous Vimoutiers Tiger tank, a surviving example of a Tiger I tank in Vimoutiers, Normandy, France. The Vimoutiers tank was abandoned by its crew in August of 1944 during the battle of the Falaise pocket near the end of the Normandy Campaign. This action by the crew serves as the album's name inspiration. The tank had served in the second company of the 102nd SS Heavy Panzer Battalion of the II SS Panzer Corps.

== Track listing ==
Side A
No.	Title	Length
1.	"The Concrete Fountain"	4:09
2.	"The Only Good Neighbor"	2:41
3.	"13 Years Of Carrion"	6:10
4.	"Burn Again"	2:00

Side B
No.	Title	Length
1.	"My Black Diaries"	6:36
2.	"Punishment Initiation"	3:33
3.	"We Said Destroy"	6:07
4.	"Europa Rising"	4:48

Side C
No.	Title	Length
1.	"Rocking Horse Night"	3:32
2.	"Death of a Man"	2:18
3.	"Passion! Power!! Purge!!!"	4:24
4.	"My Black Diary"	5:20

Side D
No.	Title	Length
1.	"In Sacrilege"	4:03
2.	"Many Enemies Bring Much Honour"	5:10
3.	"Unconditional Armistice"	4:39
4.	"Europa: The Gates Of Heaven And Hell"	5:17

== Personnel ==
- Douglas P. - composer, vocals, personnel
- Mario Kalendaric
- Campbell Finley
- Gary Carey
- Jeremy Hirsch
- Andrea James
- Ken Thomas - composer, personnel
