= Freya Aswynn =

Dutch musician and Pagan

Elizabeth Hooijschuur (born November 1949), known by her pen name Freya Aswynn, is a Dutch writer and musician, primarily known for her activities related to modern paganism in the United Kingdom. She was an early exponent of a form of Germanic neopaganism centred on women and has influenced the international modern pagan community through her book Leaves of Yggdrasil. Aswynn was involved in the early neofolk music scene in London in the 1980s, when several musicians of the genre lived in her house in Tufnell Park.

== Early life ==
Freya Aswynn was born in November 1949 in Zaanstad, the Netherlands, as Elizabeth Hooijschuur. She had a Catholic upbringing. She came into contact with the philosophy of Friedrich Nietzsche, the music of Richard Wagner and esoteric interpretations of the runes through her first husband, who died after two years of marriage. She continued to study Western esotericism, becoming acquainted with spiritualism, Rosicrucianism, astrology, Kabbalah and Thelema, before she moved to London at the age of 30.

== Pagan revivalism ==
Aswynn became involved in London's occult community and was initiated into Wicca in 1980 by Jim Bennett, supervised by Alex Sanders. Later the same year she became active in Gardnerian Wicca. A few years later she experienced what she called "an intense, spontaneous invocation of the god Woden", urging her to move into Germanic neopaganism. She created an Odinic temple in her house in Tufnell Park. The book Persuasions of the Witch's Craft (1989) by Tanya Luhrmann contains a portrayal of Aswynn—under the name Helga—and the religious activities at her house.

The experiences from Wicca left a lasting impact on Aswynn's construction of rituals. She was an early exponent of a female-centred version of Germanic neopaganism focused on seiðr, a practice which in the Old Norse sources is associated with the goddess Freyja. Aswynn interprets seiðr as a broad term for magical and shamanic practices and translates the word as "seething". During a wave of interest in rune mysticism in the 1980s she developed her own approach to runic divination. In the 1980s she maintained that runic divination only could be practiced by someone of Germanic ancestry, but in 1990 she abandoned and publicly retracted this position.

Aswynn's book Leaves of Yggdrasil (1990) has had significant influence on the practice of Germanic neopaganism on an international level. A large part of the book is devoted to "feminine mysteries". The book was revised and republished in 1998 as Northern Mysteries and Magick, accompanied by a CD with recordings of Aswynn's incantations, inspired by poems from the Poetic Edda.

Aswynn was active in Edred Thorsson's organisation the Rune-Gild until 1995. In 1993 she initiated a British branch of the American organisation the Ring of Troth, later renamed Ring of Troth Europe, and served as its leader for several years. The Ring of Troth later shortened its name to The Troth. Having left London to live in Scotland and eventually Spain, Aswynn served as an elder in The Troth, where she continued to teach and guide members. She was removed from the position in 2018 for having made social media posts which The Troth deemed to contain "increasing Islamophobic rhetoric".

== Music ==
It was a huge and somewhat dilapidated structure, full of a bizarre and everchanging assortment of bores, schizophrenics, megalomaniacs, drug fiends and even some geniuses.

— David Tibet on Aswynn's house in London

Aswynn's house in Tufnell Park was a commune with many frequent visitors; many guests were involved in esotericism of various kinds, some had mental health problems and some were drug addicts. In the mid 1980s, Aswynn became involved in the emerging neofolk music scene, as the house turned into a meeting point for musicians of the genre. Among the residents were the musicians Douglas Pearce of Death in June, David Tibet of Current 93 and Ian Read of Sol Invictus. Steven Stapleton, Diana Rogerson, Rose McDowall, Paul "Bee" Hampshire, Annie Anxiety and Hilmar Örn Hilmarsson lived nearby and became frequent visitors.

Aswynn recorded the album Fruits of Yggdrasil (1987) with Patrick Leagas' project Sixth Comm and they have performed together in what they regard as both music concerts and religious rituals. Aswynn performs her own rune chants on Current 93's album Swastikas for Noddy (1988). According to Aswynn, Hilmar was a friend of Tibet and a neopagan leader in Iceland, and when he visited her house she decided to "show off" by chanting runes; Hilmar suggested that Tibet should record her chanting, which he did. Death in June used Aswynn's invocations against the British government as the opening of many live performances. She is featured on the 1996 single "Wolf Rune" from Les Joyaux de la Princesse.

== See also ==
- Desperately Seeking Something, TV series featuring Aswynn in episode two of the first series
- Heathenry in the United Kingdom
