= Death in June =

British neofolk band

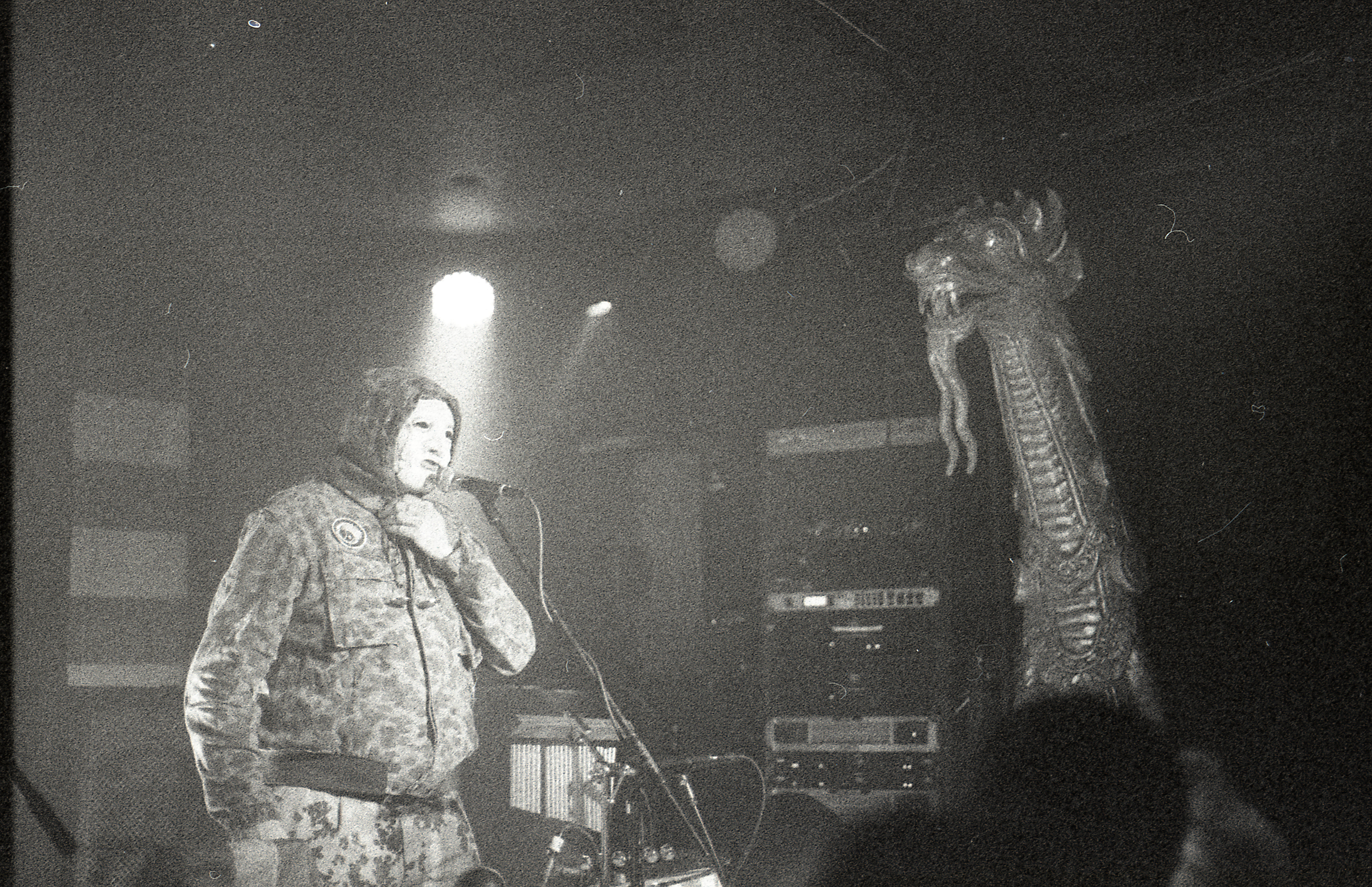

Background information
- Origin: England
- Genres: Neofolk; industrial; experimental; dark ambient; gothic rock (early); post-punk (early)
- Years active: 1981–present
- Label: NER
- Spinoffs: Above the Ruins; Sol Invictus
- Spinoff of: Crisis
- Members: Douglas P.
- Past members: Patrick Leagas; Tony Wakeford; David Tibet; Boyd Rice; John Murphy; Richard Butler
- Website: www.deathinjune.net and www.deathinjune.org

Death in June (abbreviated as either DI6 or DIJ) are a neofolk group led by English musician Douglas P. (Douglas Pearce). The band was originally formed in the United Kingdom in 1981 as a trio. However, after the other members left, in 1984 and 1985, to work on other projects, the group became the work of Douglas P. and various collaborators. Over the band's four decades of existence, they have undergone numerous shifts in style and presentation, resulting in an overall shift from initial post-punk and industrial music influence to a more acoustic and folk-music–oriented approach. Douglas P.'s influence was instrumental in originating neofolk music, of which his music has subsequently become a part.

Its visual aesthetic uses symbols and imagery evoking Nazism, which has fueled controversy, with the Southern Poverty Law Center claiming the band made white power music, and several of its albums were banned in Germany. Pearce denied the allegations, stating that "people have fallen into the trap of taking [the imagery] on a surface value".

== History ==
=== Origin ===
In 1981, Pearce formed Death in June in England, along with Patrick Leagas and Tony Wakeford. Pearce and Wakeford had been members of the left-wing and anti-fascist punk rock band Crisis, which was formed in 1977. Crisis had gained a substantial following in the UK punk subculture and had performed at rallies for The Right to Work, Rock Against Racism, and the Anti-Nazi League. According to the book Death in June: Misery and Purity from 1995 by Robert Forbes, the band's name was derived from the Night of the Long Knives, a military purge of high ranking members of the Sturmabteilung including its leader Stabschef Ernst Röhm.

=== Early years (1981–1985) ===
Death in June soon left the punk scene behind and began to infuse their sound with electronics and martial-style drumming, combined with a Joy Division-influenced post-punk sound. Then, a few years later, including a synth-heavy folk style with acoustic guitar. The synths were later phased out, and their later music added atmospheric sound loops, dialogue samples, industrial beats, etc. Their lyrics maintained much of the poetry and political urgency of the early Crisis recordings. Tracks such as the early single sides "Holy Water" and "State Laughter" demonstrated an ongoing fascination with political systems. The new name of the band came from an in-studio mishearing of "death and gloom".

In early 1984, Wakeford was fired from Death in June for "bringing his 'right-wing leanings into the group'"; at the time he had been a member of the UK's National Front. Further on, Douglas P. would abandon any overt interest in politics in favor of a more esoteric approach to his work.

==== Introduction of folk music ====
For 1984's Burial LP, Death in June began to adopt a more traditional European folk sound, using more acoustic guitars, references to ancient and contemporary European history, and combining heavy percussion with electronic soundscapes and post-industrial experimentation.

==== Nada! flirtation with dance music ====
The Nada! (1985) LP introduced a dance sound, accompanied by other tracks with the previously introduced folk elements. Douglas P. would later state this period was brought about by Patrick Leagas, which is further justified by Leagas's other work with the band Sixth Comm, and later by his joining Mother Destruction, where he would further explore themes of Germanic paganism and historically inspired music.

==== Patrick Leagas departs ====
Patrick Leagas abruptly left the group in April 1985 after a tour of Italy, resulting in many cancelled shows, in the UK and Europe, that were due to follow that tour. Leagas, who began calling himself Patrick O-Kill, later formed Sixth Comm. Thereafter, Death in June has consisted solely of the work of Douglas P. and various collaborators.

=== Mid-period Death in June (1985–1996) ===
==== Creation of World Serpent Distribution ====
In 1991, Douglas P. named and helped form World Serpent Distribution, a British distribution company that specialized in esoteric, experimental, and post-industrial music, which would distribute his NER releases until the late 1990s. During this period, Pearce collaborated with many artists who also had material distributed through the company.

==== Collaboration with David Tibet ====
David Tibet formed Current 93 in 1982. After being introduced to Douglas P. by Alan McGee of Creation Records at the Living Room Club, London, in 1983, Tibet eventually began working with Death in June. Upon meeting Tibet, Douglas P. began to devote more of his time to a new circle of collaborators, who introduced him to various Thelemic, Satanic, and Hermetic disciplines that markedly affected his approach to composing music. Familiar with the Runic alphabet, Douglas P. introduced them to Tibet. Tibet similarly had been long interested in magic and religion and implemented these concepts in his early recordings with Current 93.

Douglas P. introduced a folk influence to David Tibet, who in turn contributed to Death in June's Nada! (1985) LP and its remix version titled 93 Dead Sunwheels (1989), as well as the albums The World That Summer, Brown Book, and The Wall of Sacrifice. He continued his work with Death in June, ending their collaborations with a contribution to the 1995 LP Rose Clouds of Holocaust.

==== Collaboration with Boyd Rice begins ====
Experimental musician Boyd Rice was a friend of the group and had documented one of their earliest performances back in 1982. He was later invited to contribute a spoken word piece to The Wall of Sacrifice LP. From then on, a long series of recording collaborations continued between Boyd Rice and Douglas P., which included the albums Music, Martinis and Misanthropy, In the Shadow of the Sword, Heaven Sent, God & Beast, Wolf Pact, and finally Alarm Agents. Douglas P. also made a small appearance acting alongside Boyd Rice in the film Pearls Before Swine.

==== Collaboration with LJDLP ====
Les Joyaux De La Princesse (LJDLP) collaborated with Douglas P. on the Östenbräun double cassette release. Douglas P. sent LJDLP source material, which LJDLP would remix and send back. Douglas P. would later appear live with Les Joyaux De La Princesse for a joint show in 2001.

==== Collaboration with John Murphy begins ====
Douglas P, having moved to Australia, came back into contact with John Murphy of Knifeladder, and previously of SPK. In 1996, Murphy began playing live percussion with Death in June during tours. In 2000, a period of very stripped down, largely acoustic live performances for Death in June began up until Douglas P. announced no further live shows in 2005. In September 2011, a European tour was announced commemorating the 30th anniversary of the group's foundation in 1981. However the tour started off in Sydney, Australia, without John Murphy, who died on 11 October 2015.

=== Contemporary Death in June (1996–present) ===
==== Collaboration with Albin Julius ====
After queuing to meet his idol Douglas P. backstage at a performance in Munich in December 1996, Albin Julius of Der Blutharsch, collaborated and toured throughout Europe between 1998 and 2000 with Death in June. Together, they produced the albums Take Care & Control and Operation Hummingbird, as well as the live album Heilige!. In comparison to previous Death in June works, the material on these albums is primarily sample based, building on musical motifs from the likes of Richard Wagner, Franz Schubert, and French 1960s pop icon Serge Gainsbourg, amongst others. The two albums mark a significant departure from previous or subsequent Death in June material, featuring very little by way of Pearce's guitar; and they could be classified as a part of the martial music genre. This is itself a genre which Pearce had arguably invented in 1986 on The World That Summer album, with tracks such as "Death of a Man", and again in 1989 on The Wall of Sacrifice album, with the title track and "Death is a Drummer". Pearce wrote a song loosely inspired by an untitled Der Blutharsch song for the Fire Danger Season Der Blutharsch tribute compilation. The track title was later created and revealed as "Many Enemies Bring Much Honour", which also appears on the rework-and-rarity album Abandon Tracks!.

==== Demise of World Serpent Distribution ====
The late 1990s marked the beginning of a court case between Death in June and World Serpent Distribution, regarding payment and distribution issues, and several other artists that were then on the label. This led to many artists who had sided with, or had a similar experience to, Pearce's leaving the distribution company and largely moving to the German label Tesco Distribution, as well as other then-well-established labels such as Eis & Licht. Eventually, Pearce was issued an out-of-court settlement for the case, which, according to him, led to the demise of World Serpent Distribution. This led to reissues of most of the major albums in the Death in June discography being made freely available, with overhauled, deluxe packaging at a considerably cheaper price.

==== Collaboration with Andreas Ritter ====
On the All Pigs Must Die LP, Pearce was assisted by Andreas Ritter, of the neofolk group Forseti, who played accordion on a few tracks on the first half of the LP. This marked a return to the previous folk sound of Death in June. Death in June have also appeared live with Forseti, and Pearce appeared on Forseti's Windzeit LP.

After Andreas Ritter suffered a stroke, subsequent loss of memory, and the ability to play musical instruments, Pearce contributed acoustic versions of Death in June songs to a tribute album to Ritter, entitled Forseti Lebt, which was released in August 2006.

==== Collaboration with Boyd Rice ends ====
After completing the Alarm Agents LP, Pearce announced it would be his final collaboration with Rice, citing the decision as having been mutually decided during the recording of Alarm Agents in a studio situated in a valley in Wellington, New Zealand, as helicopters flew beneath the two of them. Pearce recalls: "We turned toward each other and said, 'This is going to be the last collaboration. It can't get better than this.'" In 2013, in order to end all speculation and questions about future collaborations between Pearce and Rice, Rice announced, via Facebook, that he had severed personal and business relationships with Pearce.

==== Collaboration with Miro Snejdr ====
In April 2009, users of the Death in June Yahoo Group pointed out the YouTube videos from pianist Miro Snejdr doing covers of classic Death in June titles: "I watched the videos Miro had posted on YouTube of instrumental songs from Death In June's The Rule of Thirds album and was very impressed. Courtesy of these members of the DIJ group we were put in contact with each other." Consequently, the piano-based album Peaceful Snow was released in November 2010, with rearrangements by Miro Snejdr, of Douglas P.'s guitar-based demo recordings. Those original recordings were later released on the album The Snow Bunker Tapes in 2013. Since 2012, Snejdr has been also performing live with Death in June, on either piano or accordion.

== Influences and aesthetics ==
=== Influences ===
Film and certain television programs have been a major influence on Death in June, sometimes being worked into compositions or referenced directly in album titles. Influential films and television shows include The World That Summer, Take a Closer Look, The Night Porter, The Prisoner, Night and Fog, and Come and See.

Pearce has cited Friedrich Nietzsche, the Norse Eddas, Yukio Mishima, Saxon poetry, and Jean Genet as strong influences upon his work. Although some of these influences have waned as the discography has increased, Genet and Mishima were quoted in the booklet of the rare track retrospective Abandon Tracks (2001).

Pearce has stated that Nico, Scott Walker, Ennio Morricone, Industrial Records-era industrial music, Forever Changes-era Love, and traditional European folk music have all had a considerable impact upon his musical output.

=== Neofolk music ===
Through his solo work as Death in June and central musical role in Current 93, from the mid-1980s to the early 1990s, Pearce's influence was also instrumental in creating the neofolk genre. As Death in June has become more based around acoustic guitars (But What Ends When the Symbols Shatter?, onwards), he has actively encouraged other acts playing this style of music, whether it be releasing material on his NER record label in the case of Strength Through Joy and Somewhere In Europe or guesting with them as he has done with Forseti. He also, on Death in June's Brown Book, gave Fire + Ice's Ian Read his first exposure. Through work with former Death in June member Tony Wakeford's Sol Invictus and solo work in Fire + Ice, Ian Read has also become a significant figure in this field, as documented in Diesel and Gerich's Looking for Europe.

=== Masks ===
He has stated that the masks have no meaning, and function more as a symbol or icon of Death In June.

=== Camouflage ===
Specific varieties of camouflage are regularly worn by Pearce, and appear on various Death in June releases. Most commonly, the variety of camouflage used is the German World War II Waffen-SS autumnal Erbsenmuster ("pea pattern", usually on original items), though sometimes the modern Bundeswehr Flecktarn or possibly the post-WWII Austrian Fleckerlteppich ("rag rug") pattern is used. The subject of camouflage has also appeared in the lyrics of Death in June, notably in the song "Hidden Among the Leaves", a reference to the Japanese Hagakure.

=== Totenkopf-6 ===
The Totenkopf-6

The Totenkopf-6 is a slightly grinning skull, framed by a circle and a small 6 in the lower right corner. Death in June has, since at least the State Laughter / Holy Water 7″, used variations of the Prussian Totenkopf or "Death's Head" symbol. Indeed, there is another explanation that has been given by Pearce, he has also stated that it symbolises "total commitment" to the group, akin to the total commitment of soldiers of the SS.

=== Whip-Hand ===
The Whip-Hand

Whip-Hand is a studded, gloved hand holding a whip surrounded by a circle and a small 6 in the lower right corner. This symbol has been used by Death in June since at least the She Said Destroy 7″/12″. Pearce stated that it signifies control and relates to having the whip hand, a British expression. The hand is gloved, giving it both a medieval and fetishistic element, and is often used either in place of the Totenkopf or with it. This symbol was adopted later than the Totenkopf and is usually secondary to it. As with the Totenkopf-6, the 6 refers to June.

=== Three Bars ===
The Three Bars are parallel, vertical bars accompanied by a small six in the lower right corner. Although a very basic symbol, it likely originates, for the use of Death in June, from the 1943 Battle of Kursk version of the insignia of the 3rd SS Panzer Division Totenkopf. This symbol was used as vehicle markings on the vehicles of that unit. It may have been used to signify the three members of Death in June at the time. It first appeared on the Lesson One: Misanthropy! LP and is rarely used when not referring directly to this period of Death in June.

=== SS runes ===
Some runes have been featured, especially those analog to runes used by the Nazi German Schutzstaffel (SS), as esoteric symbology. The Odal rune has sometimes been used by Pearce. This can be seen very visibly on the Come Before Christ and Murder Love 7″ cover. The Lebensrune has often been used by Pearce for non-album Death in June purposes, appearing sometimes with a circle around it as seen on The World That Summer 2×LP, on the official website and elsewhere.

== Relationship to far-right politics ==
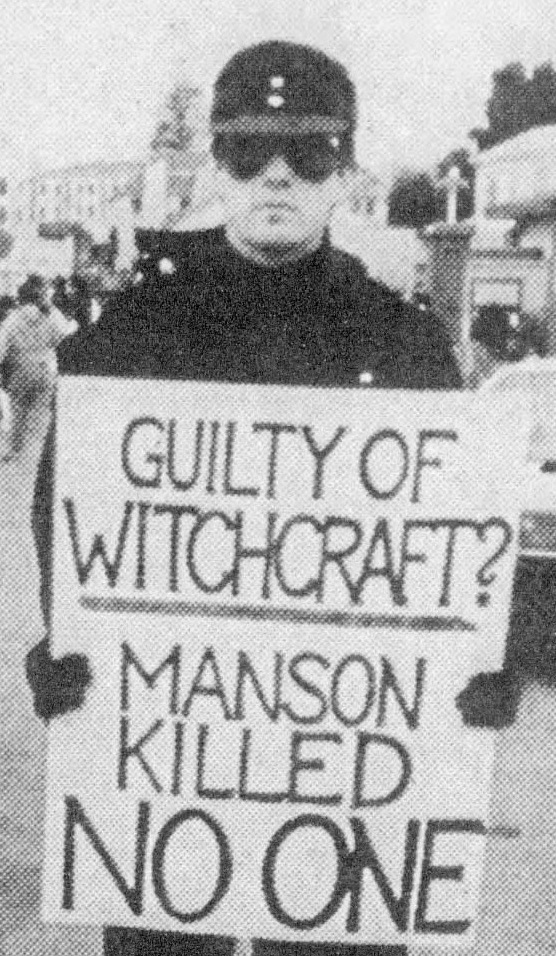
Former Death in June member Boyd Rice protesting in support of Charles Manson in 1989

Death in June frequently utilizes costumes and imagery that invoke that of the Nazi Party. Pearce played down the band's imagery, saying, "Obviously people have fallen into the trap of taking it on a surface value. That is their problem." In 1995, Pearce said, "At the start of the eighties, Tony [Wakeford] and I were involved in radical left politics and beneath it history students. In search of a political view for the future we came across National Bolshevism which is closely connected with the SA hierarchy. People like Gregor Strasser and Ernst Röhm who were later known as 'second revolutionaries' attracted our attention."

The Southern Poverty Law Center considers Death in June to be white power music harboring neo-Nazi sympathies.

A Death in June concert was scheduled to take place at a venue called The Empty Bottle on Saturday, 13 December 2003, with Der Blutharsch and Changes. Initially, a group calling themselves the Center for New Community (CNC) applied pressure on the owner of the club, Bruce Finkelman. Finkelman, who is Jewish, and his staff, which includes African Americans, initially decided the show would go on, feeling there was insufficient evidence to cancel the performance. Debate continued on The Empty Bottle's website, fueled partially by an email and ten-day telephone campaign waged by the CNC to ban the event. Finkelman offered a compromise: he invited the CNC to distribute anti-racist information within the venue, as well as any other group that wished to do so, and offered to give the venue's proceeds of the concert to the Anti-Defamation League. The CNC refused. Finkelman, feeling the pressure, started to relent and decided to remove Changes from the bill. As the controversy mounted from complaints regarding the band due to the Center for New Community's campaign, he eventually cancelled the night altogether, due to the mounting pressure and threats of violence from other groups. Finkelman expressed regret for this decision, describing the censorship as a "black mark on the arts community" and continued to encourage open discussion instead of censorship. The venue was moved to Deja Vu, another venue in Chicago, that Saturday. Members of Anti-Racist Action began to gather at the venue. The concert was cancelled by the venue owners just before it was scheduled to begin, due to violence between Anti-Racist Action and fans of Death in June.

On 21 December 2005, the Federal Department for Media Harmful to Young Persons in Germany banned all sales and distribution of Rose Clouds of Holocaust to minors. The title track has been accused of promoting Holocaust denial. Pearce appealed the ban, claiming that his usage of the word "holocaust" references its original Greek meaning of "burnt offerings" and not The Holocaust. The 1987 album Brown Book was also banned for containing lyrics of the Nazi Party's national anthem, the "Horst-Wessel-Lied", which violates Germany's Strafgesetzbuch section 86a.

In 2013, a Death in June concert in Salem, Massachusetts, was cancelled and relocated 65 miles away, to Worcester, because of security concerns related to threats of protest.

In 2017, Oregon record label Soleilmoon Recordings was listed on the hate group registry of the Southern Poverty Law Center (SPLC) for distributing albums by Death in June, and Boyd Rice's project NON. Charles Powne, the label's owner, denied that Soleilmoon was racist, and said that Pearce and Rice are not racist either. The SPLC pointed out a 1996 quote from Pearce where he proudly aligned with Eurocentrism: "I am totally Eurocentric. I'm not overly concerned with the past but I do care about the present and the future. European culture, morals, ethics, whatever are under attack from all sides these days."

== Discography ==
=== Studio albums ===
- The Guilty Have No Pride (1983)
- Burial (1984)
- Nada! (1985)
- The World That Summer (1986)
- Brown Book (1987)
- The Wall of Sacrifice (1989)
- But, What Ends When the Symbols Shatter? (1992)
- Rose Clouds of Holocaust (1995)
- Take Care & Control (1998)
- Operation Hummingbird (1999)
- All Pigs Must Die (2001)
- The Rule of Thirds (2008)
- Peaceful Snow/Lounge Corps (2010)
- The Snow Bunker Tapes (2013)
- Essence! (2018)
- NADA-IZED! (2022)

=== Collaborative albums ===
- Östenbräun (1989) (collaboration with Les Joyaux De La Princesse)
- Death in June Presents: Occidental Martyr (1995) (collaboration with Max Wearing)
- Death in June Presents: KAPO! (1996) (collaboration with Richard Leviathan)
- Heaven Sent (1996) (collaboration with Boyd Rice and John Murphy of The Associates under the name Scorpion Wind)
- Alarm Agents (2004) (collaboration with Boyd Rice)
- Free Tibet (2006) (collaboration with David Tibet)
