= The Wall of Sacrifice =

Studio album by Death in June
- Released: 1989
- Genre: Neofolk; martial industrial; dark ambient; experimental
- Length: 42:51
- Label: New European Recordings

Death in June chronology
Östenbräun (1989)	The Wall of Sacrifice (1989)	But, What Ends When the Symbols Shatter? (1992)

Professional ratings
Review scores
Source	Rating
Allmusic	3/5 stars

The Wall of Sacrifice (spelled as Thè Wäll Öf Säcrificè on vinyl cover) is an experimental, dark folk album by Death in June. The original vinyl pressing, released in 1989, was limited to 666 copies. A CD version was released in 1990.

== Track listing ==
1. "The Wall of Sacrifice" - 15:57
  - Sixteen minute martial, minimalist track that features sparse keyboard, military drumming and trumpeting, German folk singing (at 9:08 "Märkische Heide [de]"), German military marches, a child's sing-song looped and repeated, and various other noise and vocal effects.
2. "Giddy Giddy Carousel" - 2:22
  - An atmospheric folk song featuring Douglas P.'s cryptic lyrics relating to the ruins of Europa. Background vocals by Rose McDowall
3. "Heilige Leben" - 2:30
  - Instrumental, hypnotic soundscape featuring echoized fragments of Rose McDowall's vocals as well as a submerged, repeated vocal by her (Holy Life in German).
4. "Fall Apart" - 2:26
  - Traditional folk arrangement, distorted guitar intro, with vocal and lyric by Douglas P. Instrumentation contributed by David Tibet.
5. "Bring in the Night" - 4:18
  - Military drumming and a stark, misanthropic spoken piece from Boyd Rice, vocal by Rose McDowall.
6. "In Sacrilege" - 3:59
  - Acoustic guitar and multiple vocal tracks, over industrial bed. Vocal(s) by David Tibet.
7. "Hullo Angel" - 1:34
  - Also Recorded for the Current 93 album, Swastikas for Noddy. Vocal by Douglas P.
8. "Death is a Drummer" - 9:17
  - Nine minutes. Looped noise effects, embedded electronics, military marches, treated vocals, simulated aircraft manoeuverings and a range of other effects and treatments.

Some versions also have a hidden track, "Heilige Tod" ("Holy Death" in German).

== Personnel ==
- Douglas P.
- David Tibet
- Rose McDowall
- Boyd Rice
- Nikolas Schreck
- Andrea James
- Jan O
