= Vimoutiers Tiger tank =

World War II monument in France

- Char Tigre de Vimoutiers
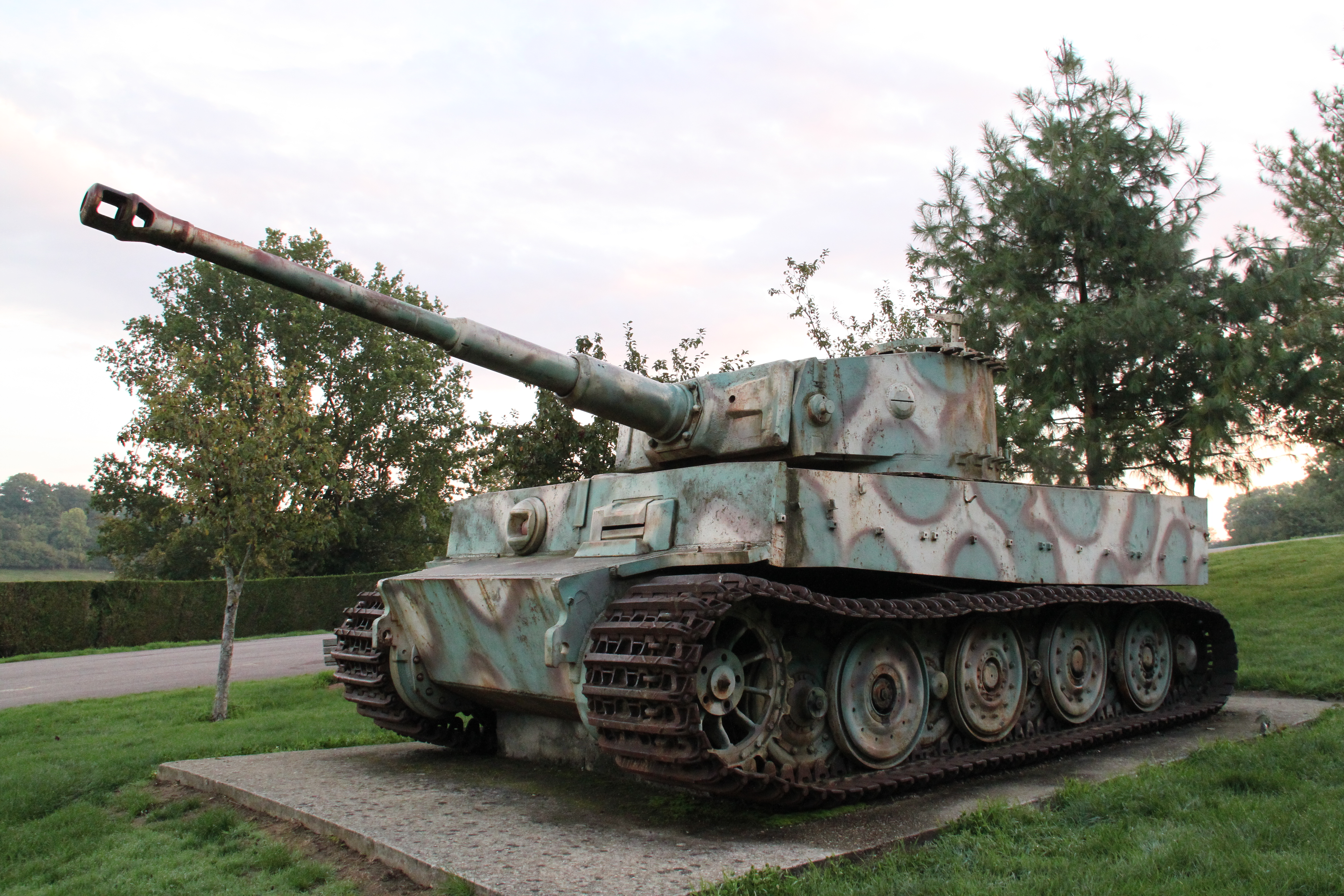
- Vimoutiers Tiger tank in 2010
- Interactive map of Vimoutiers Tiger tank
- Location: Outskirts of Vimoutiers, beside the D979
- Coordinates: 48.9237°N 0.2149°E
- Designer: Henschel & Son
- Type: Tiger tank
- Length: 6.316 m (20 ft 8.7 in) 8.45 m (27 ft 9 in) (gun facing forward)
- Width: 3.70 m (12 ft 2 in)
- Height: 3.0 m (9 ft 10 in)

The Vimoutiers Tiger tank is a World War II German Tiger I tank on outdoor display at Vimoutiers in the Orne Department, Normandy, France. The tank was abandoned by its crew in August 1944 during the latter stages of the Battle of Normandy. Originally resting in a ditch by the side of the road, it was bought by the local commune and put on display in 1975. It is listed as an historical monument. The Tiger tank is in poor condition after being outdoors for over 80 years.

== History ==
The tank is a Panzerkampfwagen VI Tiger Ausf. E (with ordnance inventory designation Sd.Kfz. 181, late-production version), with serial number "251 113 AMP" on the turret (AMP refers to the tank's manufacturer, Dortmund-Hoerder Hüttenverein). The vehicle's chassis number is currently unknown. The tank, numbered as 231 (according to the information display board next to the tank), belonged to the 2nd Company of the 102nd SS Heavy Panzer Battalion (although there is some debate surrounding exactly which unit this tank was attached to, with some sources attaching it to the 503rd Heavy Panzer Battalion).

Between the 12 and 20 August 1944 the Allies launched an offensive to close the Falaise pocket at Chambois, from where remnants of the German army were attempting to escape. Vimoutiers was near the junction of Anglo-Canadian and Polish forces in the north and US and French forces in the south. On 21 August 1944, along with other German tanks (Panthers, Panzer IIIs and IVs and other Tigers) and a variety of military vehicles, the Tiger was heading out of the Falaise pocket to a fuel dump at the Chateau de l'Horloge in Ticheville during the final days of the Battle of Normandy. It is thought the tank ran out of fuel on RN 179 just after leaving Vimoutiers. The tank's crew abandoned the tank and set off two explosive charges on the vehicle, which left the tank's turret immobilized and damaged the engine decking, leaving distinct cracking on the thick armoured plates. About sixty German armoured vehicles were abandoned in the vicinity of Vimoutiers.

Advancing units of 2nd Canadian Division (the Black Watch) later bulldozed the tank off the road (it being an obstruction to road traffic) and down into a shallow embankment beside it.

== Post-war ==
After World War II, much of the Normandy region was littered with discarded military hardware. Local scrap dealers purchased this hardware off the landowner (on whose property the hardware was on) and scrapped the vehicles. This Tiger I was sold to a scrap dealer called M. Morat, who removed easily accessible parts of the tank such as the transmission gearbox, various hatches, among other smaller fittings and exhaust cowlings, etc. Over time, souvenir hunters also removed other small items off the tank.

For the next 30 years, however, the tank remained rusting in its roadside ditch, retrieving it being difficult due to the tank's considerable size and weight. After Morat’s death, ownership of the tank was passed to his sister, who then sold it over to another scrap dealer in Caen. When this new owner attempted to start scrapping the tank, starting first with its turret, the local people of Vimoutiers decided to preserve the historic combat vehicle and purchased it for 6,000 francs to keep as a historical monument.

The tank was featured prominently in the May 1975 issue (issue 8) of After the Battle magazine.

In October 1975, the tank was recovered by Alain Roudeix. The turret was first lifted off to reduce the overall weight and the chassis was then pulled and pushed out of the roadside ditch by bulldozers. The turret was replaced and the tank was placed on a concrete plinth close to where it was originally abandoned in 1944. Having been partially restored, the Tiger tank remains on display on the outskirts of Vimoutiers beside the road heading towards Gacé on Route Départemental D979. It was classified as a French Monument Historique in December 1975.

The Vimoutiers Tiger tank is one of only ten known intact Tiger I tanks remaining in the world. France and Russia both have two, the Tank Museum in Bovington in the UK has a working Tiger I and the US and Germany each have one.

The tank is featured in Death in June's compilation album Abandon Tracks!.

== Preservation attempts ==
Weather and time have caused damage to the vehicle. The tank's current paint scheme was applied by a local volunteer and does not resemble the authentic green, dark-yellow and red-brown camouflage that German Tiger tanks wore during the Normandy campaign. The tank also has its missing hatches replaced with metal plates (sealing off access inside the vehicle) and two Panzer IV engine deck-covers in place of the original Tiger's radiator deck-covers.

As of 2013, the mayor of Vimoutiers began seeking funds for a restoration project. However, due to the high cost, no decision on whether to carry out this restoration has been passed by the city council.

The tank is owned by the commune of Vimoutiers who have delegated the restoration of the tank to the Association for the Restoration of the Vimoutiers Tiger Tank in Normandy (L'association pour la Restauration du Char Tigre de Vimoutiers en Normandie, in French this has the acronym CATIVEN). On the Vimoutiers tourist website it is indicated that following restoration the tank may be moved to a more central location in the town in the hope it draws more visitors to the local shops.

In March 2018, a low fence was erected around the tank to prevent visitors from climbing on it. No further restoration has taken place.

== Gallery ==
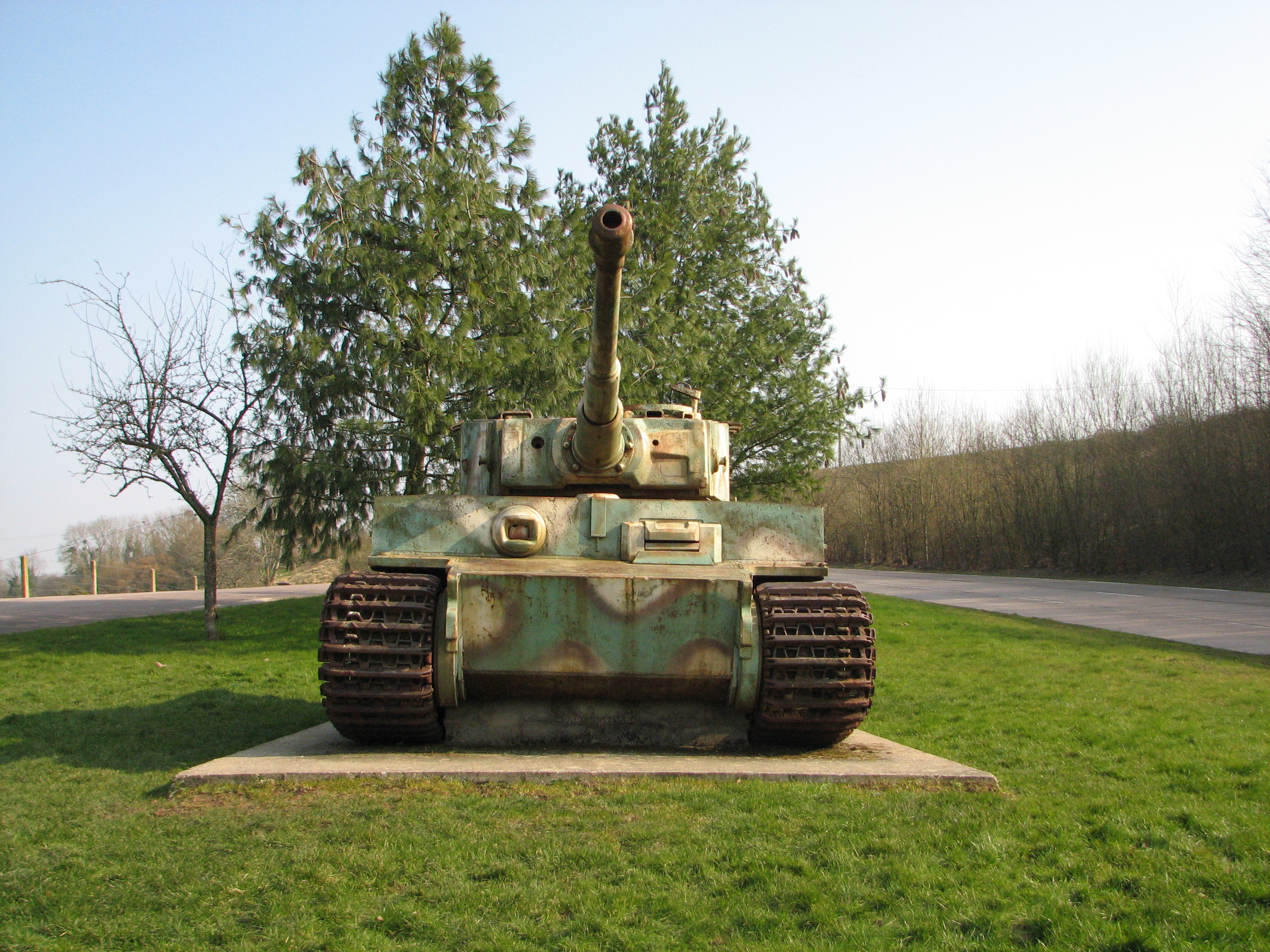
Frontal view of the Tiger tank. The concrete block between the tracks prevents access inside the tank as it has no floor any more.

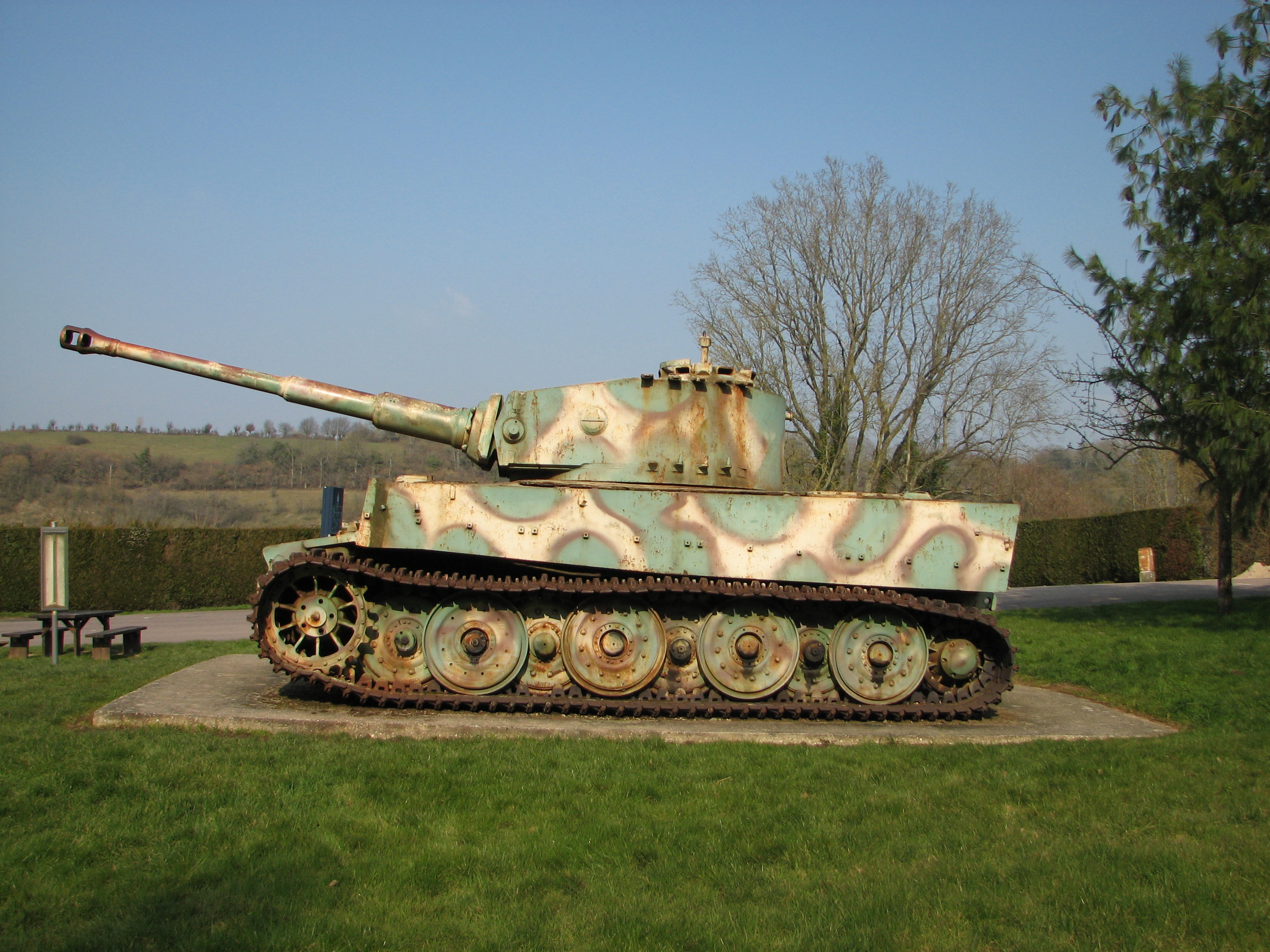
The current camouflage scheme does not reproduce that originally found on the tank, but was done by a local volunteer who restored the tank

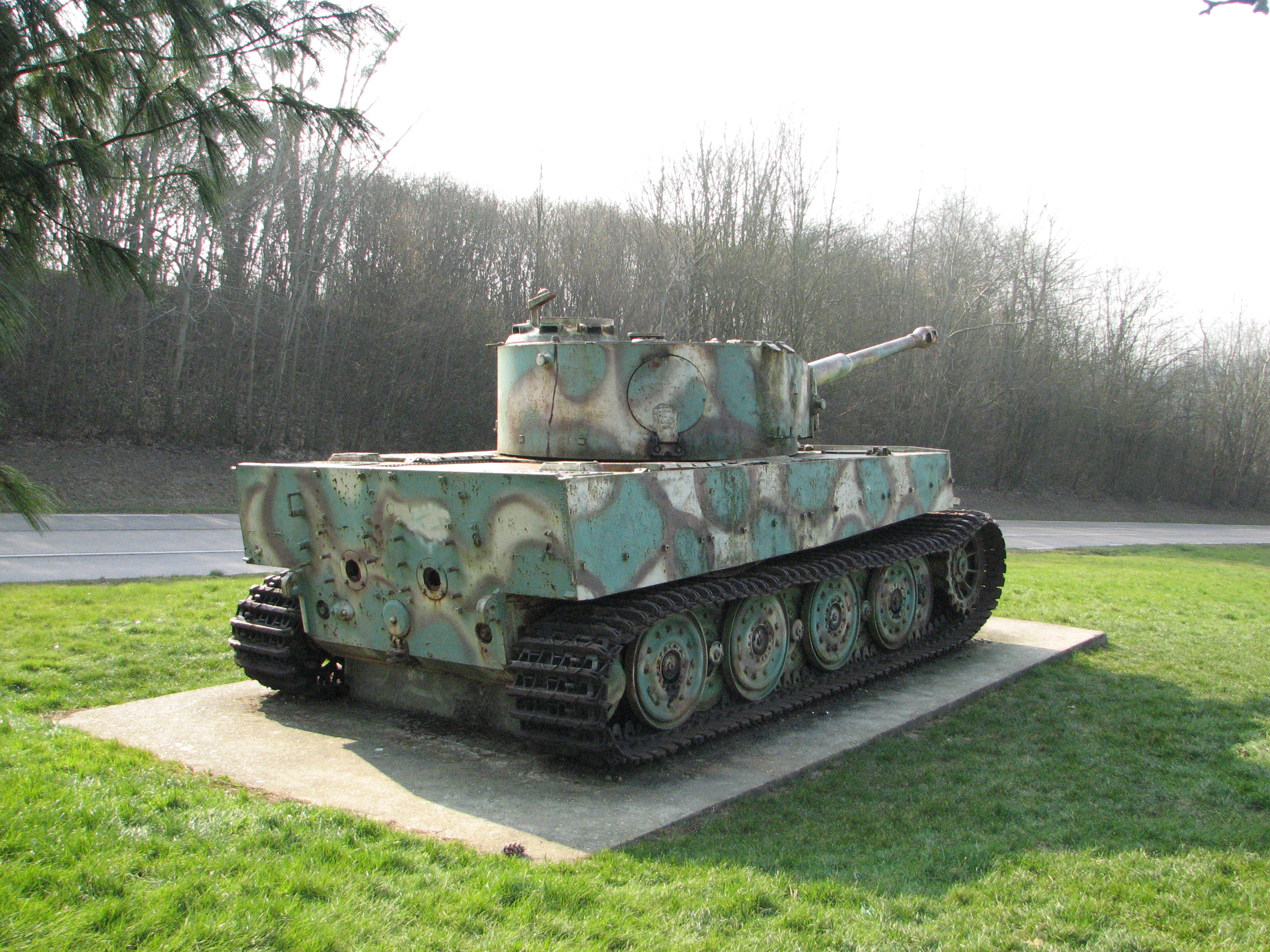
Three-quarters backside view. The tracks are the field tracks (the Tiger displayed in Saumur has road tracks).

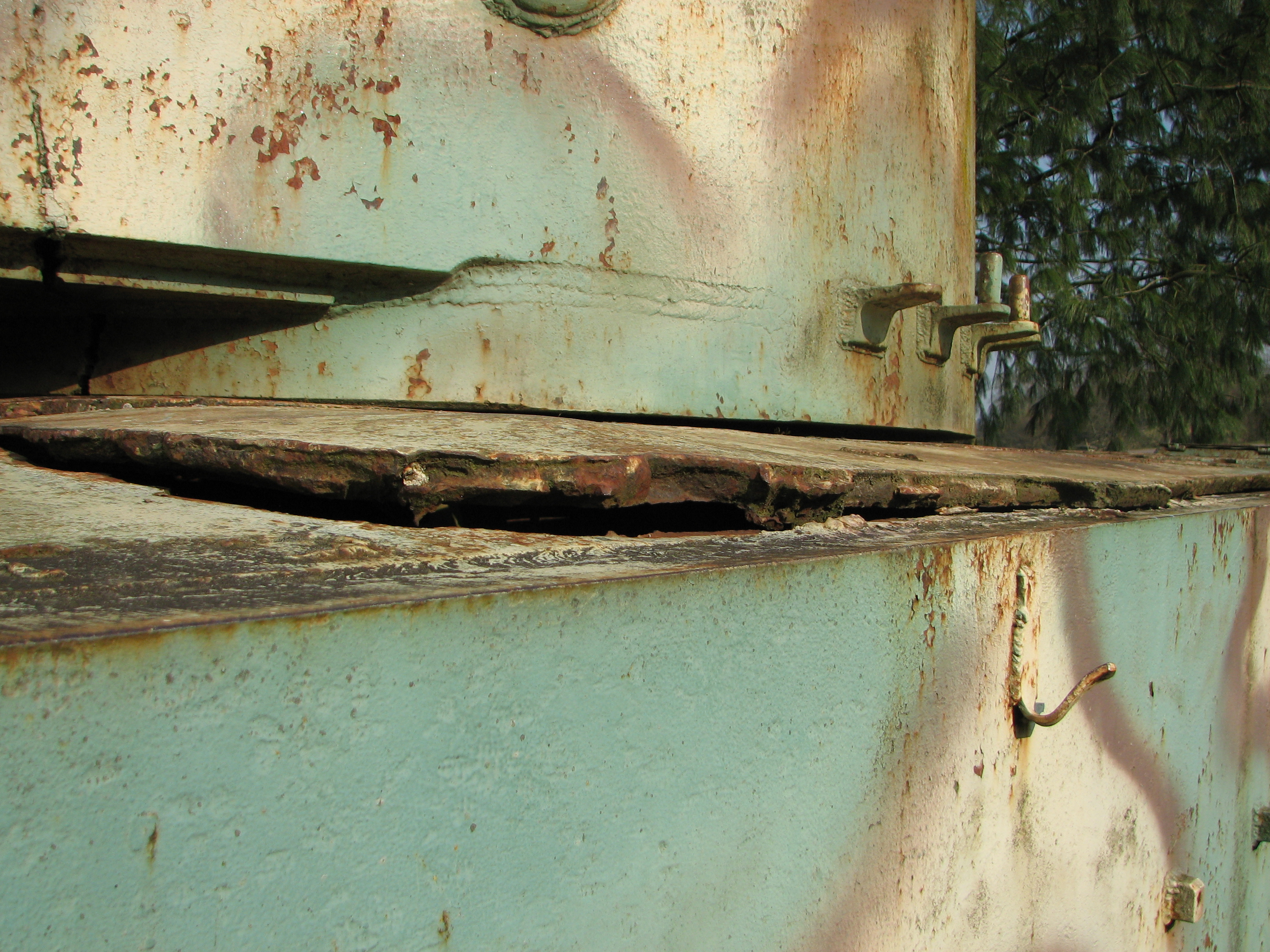
One of the cracked armored plates.

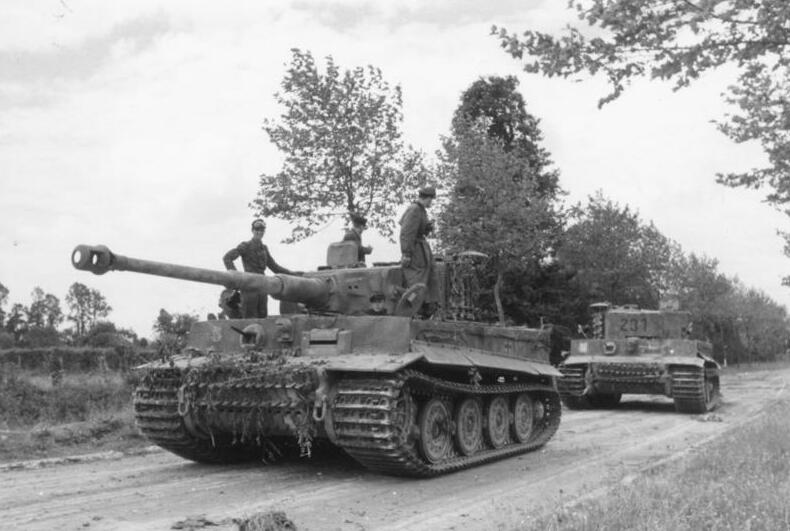
June 1944 picture showing Tiger 231
