= Burial (Death in June album) =

Studio album by Death in June
- Released: 15 September, 1984
- Studios: Maska Studios; Clarendon Hotel
- Genres: Neofolk, Post-punk, Post-Industrial, Gothic rock, Dark wave, Experimental rock
- Length: 44:10
- Language: English
- Label: Leprosy Disc
- Producer: Douglas P.

Death in June chronology
The Guilty Have No Pride (1983)	Burial (1984)	Nada! (1985)

Burial is a 1984 album by the English neofolk band Death in June. The album was released on 15 September, 1984 through Douglas P.'s own record label, Leprosy Disc. Burial was the second major album released in the band's discography following the band's debut album The Guilty Have No Pride (1983).

== Background ==
According to the bands 1994 biographic book Le Livre Brun by Jean-Louis Vaxelaire, the album's original title was proposed as "Honor, Discipline, Loyalty”, however, due to the fate of bandmember Tony Wakeford leaving the band in 1984, the album's title was finalized as "Burial", symbolizing the end of Wakeford's relationship to Death in June.

According to the band's official discography archive, side A of the album includes several reworked variations of previous songs released by Death in June including All Alone in Her Nirvana. Meanwhile, side B of the album is a live recording of a gig at the Clarendon Hotel in Hammersmith and was recorded in October of 1983 by Steven Stapleton (known artistically as "Babs Santini") using a 4-track cartridge machine. Burial is the last album released by the band before Wakeford left Death in June in 1984.

Douglas Pearce described the album in an interview as "skippable - half of it is live and the rest is (done better) elsewhere". Sputnikmusic describes the album as being a "full blown masterpiece", with each song being "favorable and easily approachable". According to DeBaser, an Italian music review website, Burial is described as being divided amongst the different personalities of the band members; "the introspective moods of Pearce, the angry romanticism of Wakeford, and the martial arrogance of Leagas".

== Cover art ==
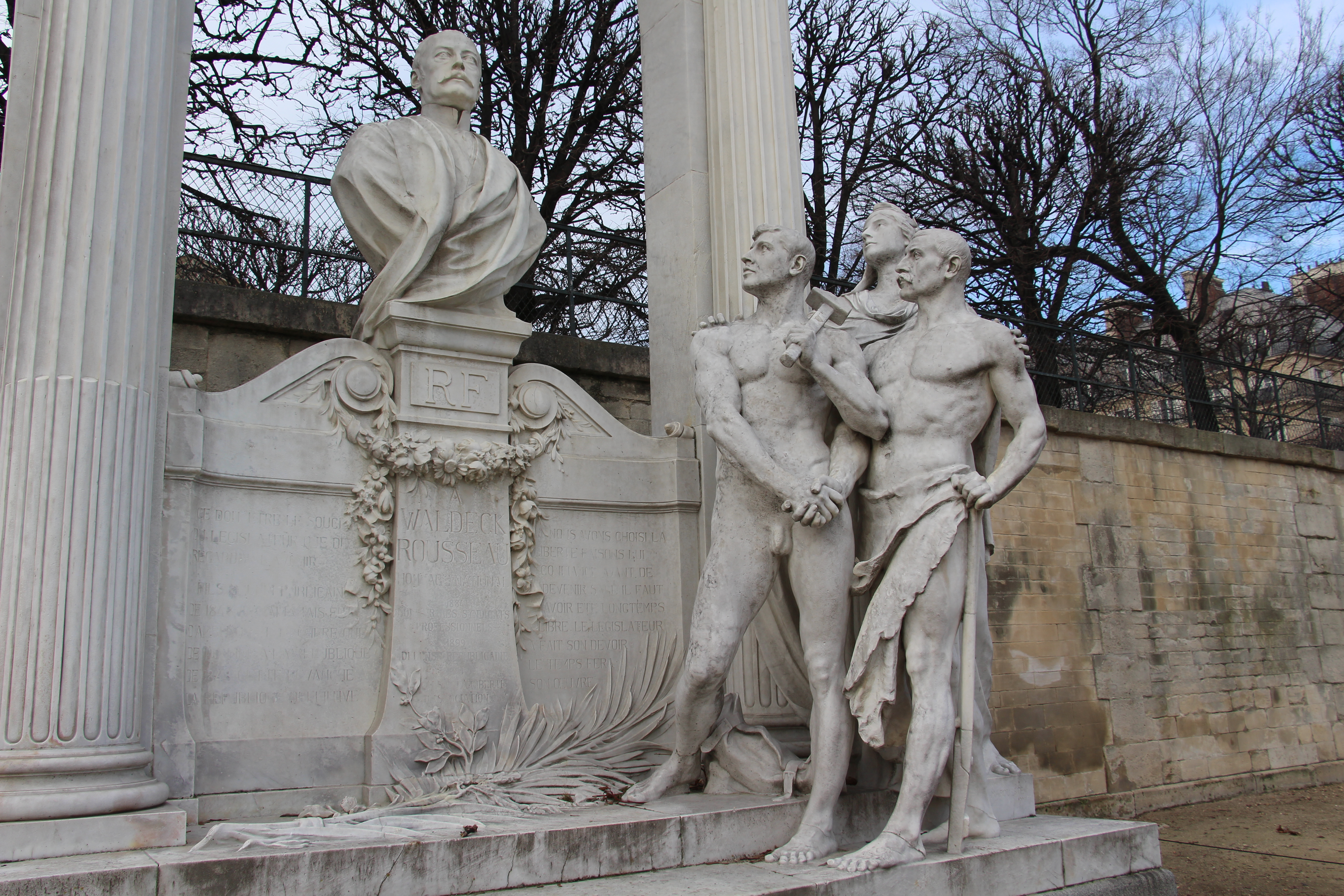
The Waldeck-Rousseau monument in Paris by Laurent Marqueste is featured on the album's cover art

The cover art for the album features several of the faces used in the 1909 monument of Pierre Waldeck-Rousseau at the Tuileries Garden in Paris by French sculptor Laurent Marqueste.

== Track listing ==
Side Studio
No.	Title	Length
1.	"Death of the West"	2:10
2.	"Fields"	2:45
3.	"Nirvana"	2:46
4.	"Sons of Europe"	2:48
5.	"Black Radio"	6:55

Side Live
No.	Title	Length
1.	"Till The Living Flesh Is Burned"	7:21
2.	"All Alone In Her Nirvana"	3:51
3.	"Fields"	3:33
4.	"We Drive East"	3:40
5.	"Heaven Street"	6:42

== Personnel ==
- George Peckham - lacquer cutter
- Douglas Pearce - performer
- Patrick Leagas - performer
- Tony Wakeford - performer
- Richard Butler - featured
- Iain O'Higgins - sound engineer
- Dave Lokan - remastering engineer (CD version only)
