= The Rule of Thirds =

Studio album by Death in June
- Released: 2008
- Recorded: March 20 – October 31, 2007
- Studio: Big Sound Studios; The Full Bench
- Genre: Neofolk
- Length: 48:56
- Label: Soleilmoon
- Producer: Dave Lokan

Death in June chronology
| Free Tibet (2006) | The Rule of Thirds (2008) | Peaceful Snow/Lounge Corps (2010) |

Professional ratings
Review scores
| Source | Rating |
|---|---|
| AllMusic | 3.5/5 stars |

The Rule of Thirds is an album by Death in June released in 2008 as CD and LP (2x10").

This is the first actual studio release since the 2001 album All Pigs Must Die. The stripped-down neofolk sound of the album has been likened to Rose Clouds of Holocaust, Brown Book and But, What Ends When the Symbols Shatter?.

== Track listing ==
All music and lyrics by Douglas P.

1. "The Glass Coffin" - 5:55
2. "Forever Loves Decay" - 4:04
3. "Jesus, Junk and the Jurisdiction" - 4:09
4. "Idolatry" - 3:35
5. "Good Mourning Sun" - 3:58
6. "The Perfume of Traitors" - 3:45
7. "Last Europa Kiss" - 2:09
8. "The Rule of Thirds" - 4:13
9. "Truly Be" - 2:45
10. "Their Deception" - 3:08
11. "My Rhine Atrocity" - 3:35
12. "Takeyya" - 3:32
13. "Let Go" - 4:10

== Personnel ==
- Douglas P. - acoustic guitar, vocals, sounds, handclaps, samples
- Dave Lokan - acoustic guitar (lead), bass, backing vocals (track 13), engineering
