= Der Blutharsch =

Austrian music project founded by Albin Julius

- Der Blutharsch in Moscow, left to right: Marthynna, Albin Julius and Bain Wolfkind.

Background information
- Also known as: Der Blutharsch and the Infinite Church of the Leading Hand
- Origin: Austria
- Genres: Martial industrial; Neofolk; Dark ambient; Psychedelic rock; Experimental rock; Krautrock
- Years active: 1996–2022
- Labels: Arthur's Round Table; WKN; Ewers Tonkunst; Nordung; The Eastern Front; Topheth Prophet; Handmade Birds; New Era Productions; Steinklang Industries; WéMè Records; Ván; Klanggalerie
- Members: Albin Julius; Marthynna; Bain Wolfkind; Jörg B.
- Website: www.derblutharsch.com

Der Blutharsch was an Austrian music project founded in 1996 by Albin Julius. Initially associated with martial industrial, dark ambient, and neofolk, the project later shifted toward psychedelic and experimental rock. Its sound evolved from atmospheric compositions to a more band-oriented style, and in 2010 it was renamed Der Blutharsch and the Infinite Church of the Leading Hand. Julius led the project until his death on 4 May 2022.

== History ==
=== Origins and early style (1996–2002) ===
Der Blutharsch was founded in 1996 by Albin Julius Martinek (1967–2022), originally conceived as a side project to The Moon Lay Hidden Beneath a Cloud. The name refers to historical Swiss mercenary groups and can be translated as "congealed blood". Most of the project's output was released through Julius's own label, WKN (Wir Kapitulieren Niemals), meaning “We Will Never Surrender” in German.

In 1996, Der Blutharsch debuted with a self-titled picture disc limited to 250 copies. Early releases, such as Der Sieg des Lichtes Ist des Lebens Heil! (1998), were grounded in dark ambient, making extensive use of historical samples, post-industrial drones, and atmospheric soundscapes. By the late 1990s, with albums like The Pleasures Received in Pain (1999) and The Track of the Hunted (2000), the project's sound had shifted toward martial industrial, blending neoclassical instrumentation with experimental elements and imagery inspired by Germanic and European history.

Initially a one‑man electronic act, Der Blutharsch expanded to include two or three performers, adding martial drumming and spoken or shouted vocals—shown in the video Gold Gab Ich Für Eisen (1999) and later in God Blast America! (filmed 2002, released 2011). During this period, Julius collaborated with several post-industrial and neofolk acts, including Death in June on Take Care & Control (1998), Operation Hummingbird (1999), and the live album Heilige!; Deutsch Nepal on the split single Apöcalyptic Climäx 2 (1999); and Boyd Rice on the joint project Wolf Pact (2002).

=== Shift to psychedelic rock (2003–2009) ===
Over time, the project transitioned into a full band format, incorporating acoustic instruments and female vocals. Permanent members came to include Marthynna, Jörg B., and Bain Wolfkind. The transition began with Time Is Thee Enemy! (2003), where early traces of psychedelic textures appeared within the martial framework. In the albums that followed—When Did Wonderland End? (2005), The Philosopher’s Stone (2007), Everything Is Alright! (2008), and Flying High (2009)—psychedelic and rock elements became increasingly prominent, gradually overtaking the project's industrial and martial roots.

Live performances and artwork began to reflect psychedelic pop‑art influences, abandoning earlier historical themes. The band performed at the Incubate Festival in Tilburg in September 2009.

=== Der Blutharsch and the Infinite Church of the Leading Hand (2010–2022) ===
From 2010 onwards, the project was rebranded as Der Blutharsch and the Infinite Church of the Leading Hand, marking a shift in identity and creative direction. The first release under the new name was Story About the Digging of the Hole and the Hearing of the Sounds from Hell (2010). Over the following decade, the group issued more than a dozen albums and EPs, including The End of the Beginning (2011), Today I Want to Catch Clouds (2014), Joyride (2015), What Makes You Pray (2017), and Wish I Weren’t Here (2019).

In its later years, the band collaborated with several artists, including King Dude on A Collaboration (2011) and Black Rider on the Storm (2022), Aluk Todolo on A Collaboration (2011), and White Hills on Desire (2012).

Albin Julius continued to lead the project until his death on 4 May 2022, at the age of 54. The cause was not disclosed.

== Controversies ==
Julius's work has frequently been described as neo-fascist due to its prominent use of military themes and fascist aesthetics, including references to Third Reich-era imagery, and the release of 7″ split singles with Italian neo-fascist bands such as Zetazeroalfa and Sotto Fascia Semplice, alongside the Austrian doom metal group Our Survival Depends On Us. The project also collaborated with artists outside that political sphere—for example, the anarchist industrial band Terroritmo (later Wakinyan). Julius consistently rejected ideological labels, framing his use of such symbols as ironic or provocative.

In 2004, a scheduled performance in Israel was cancelled following protests from high-level officials—including members of the Israeli cabinet and Knesset—as well as the mayor of Tel Aviv and the Anti-Defamation League.

In 2016, ahead of a planned concert at Vienna's Arena venue, Vice reported renewed controversy over Julius's past use of far-right symbolism. Julius described his aesthetic as “Kinky March Music” and defended his use of provocative imagery as ironic rather than ideological, emphasizing the role of irony in his work.

== Members ==
- Albin Julius – founder and the constant member of the project (died 2022).
- Marthynna – vocals, percussion, harmonium.
- Jörg "Lanz" Buchmüller – guitar and vocals.
- Bain Wolfkind – drums, also known for his solo work under the eponymous name.
