= Operation Hummingbird =

Operation Hummingbird may refer to:

- Operation Hummingbird or Night of the Long Knives, the 1934 political purge in Nazi Germany
- Operation Hummingbird (album), a 1999 studio album by Death in June
- Operation Hummingbird, a police investigation into unexplained deaths at the Countess of Chester Hospital which led to the conviction of serial killer Lucy Letby
