= The Snow Bunker Tapes =

Studio album by Death in June
- Released: 21 March, 2013
- Genre: Neofolk
- Length: 54:13
- Language: English
- Label: New European Recordings
- Producer: Douglas P.

Death in June chronology
Peaceful Snow/ Lounge Corps (2010)	The Snow Bunker Tapes (2013)	Essence! (2018)

The Snow Bunker Tapes is a 2013 album by the English neofolk project Death in June. The album was released through New European Recordings. The album features piano and accordion backings by Slovenian pianist Miro Snejdr. The album's parent release was the third song featured in the album, Peaceful Snow, which Pearce had previously collaborated with Snejdr on in 2010.

According to a review with the music journal Compulsion, the album features many songs with certain "Totenpop" themes similar to the 2008 album, The Rule of Thirds. According to the same review "the idea was for Miro to provide instrumental piano versions of songs from the Death In June canon".

== Track listing ==
1. "Murder Made History" – 5:06
2. "Fire Feast" – 4:39
3. "Peaceful Snow" – 3:26
4. "Life Under Siege" – 4:53
5. "A Nausea" – 4:12
6. "Wolf Rose" – 4:56
7. "The Scents Of Genocide" – 4:01
8. "Red Odin Day" – 3:34
9. "My Company Of Corpses" – 4:13
10. "Cemetery Cove" – 5:13
11. "Our Ghosts Gather" – 4:17
12. "Neutralize Decay" – 3:27
13. "The Maverick Chamber" – 4:16

== Personnel ==
- Douglas P. - acoustic guitar, vocals, sounds
- Miro Snejdr - piano, accordion
