= Patrick Leagas =

British musician

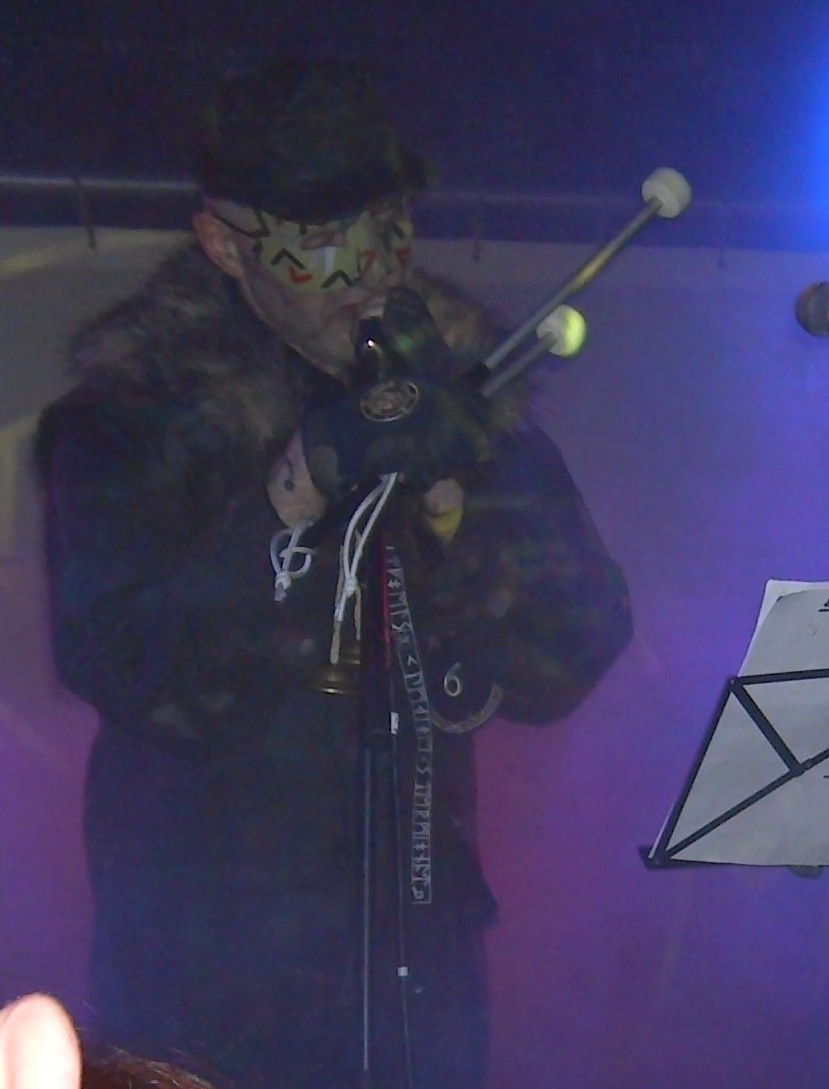
- Legas in 2014

Background information
- Also known as: Godlessstate; Patrick O'Kill; Schräge Musik; Sram Wang-Kor
- Born: January 1, 1961 (age 65); England, United Kingdom
- Genres: Dark wave Synth-pop; Neofolk
- Member of: Sixth Comm
- Formerly of: Death in June

Patrick Leagas (born 1 January 1961), is a British musician. Leagas was a founding member of Death In June. After leaving Death In June in 1985 during a tour in Italy, Leagas formed Sixth Comm in 1986 and began working under the name Patrick O'Kill. Sixth Comm frequently collaborated with the Dutch neopagan Freya Aswynn and expressed neopagan themes. Leagas later met vocalist Amodali at a Liverpool club in 1989. The two collaborated extensively in the 1990s as Mother Destruction, which released five albums with pagan themes and influences from electronic dance music. After this, Leagas left music for a period of time when he focused on family life and lived abroad. He returned to music with a double album with Sixth Comm in 2006.

== Discography ==
1983 The Guilty Have No Pride by Death In June
1984 Burial by Death In June
1985 Nada! by Death In June
1987 Content With Blood by Sixth Comm
1987 A Nothing Life by Sixth Comm
1987 The Fruits Of Yggdrasil by Sixth Comm & Freya Aswynn
1989 Morthogenisis by Six Comm
1990 Asylum by Sixth Comm
1990 Seething (The Breath Of The Serpent) by Six Comm
1993 Grey Years by Sixth Comm
1998 Fetch by Mother Destruction
1998 Hagazussa by Mother Destruction
2000 Chemantra by Mother Destruction
2006 Headless by 6 ‹omm
2014 Fleischmaschine by Schräge Musik / 6
2014 Ontogeny I by Six Comm
2014 Ontogeny II by Six Comm
2015 One Mans Hel by 6Comm
2017 Liberty Nest by 6<omm & ACL As Hexas
2021 Messiah Complex by Six Comm
2022 Stefn by Six Comm
