= Music, Martinis and Misanthropy =

Studio album and spoken word by Boyd Rice and Friends
- Released: 1990
- Recorded: Denver, Tokyo, 1989–1990
- Genres: Neofolk, spoken word, experimental, black comedy
- Length: 40:49
- Label: NER

Music, Martinis and Misanthropy is an album by Boyd Rice, released in 1990 by New European Recordings. It was recorded in Tokyo, Japan and Denver, Colorado between July 1989 and March 1990 and features several notable neofolk artists - Douglas P. (of Death in June), Tony Wakeford (of Sol Invictus), Rose McDowall (of Strawberry Switchblade) and Michael Moynihan and Bob Ferbrache of Blood Axis. Most of the music was arranged by Douglas P. in collaboration with Rice and Ferbrache.

This album was inspired by Rod McKuen's spoken word albums and Jackie Gleason's romantic recordings from the 1950s. The title and album cover are a tribute to Gleasons's album, Music, Martinis, and Memories. The liner notes thank Anton LaVey, Rod McKuen, Ragnar Redbeard, Lee Hazlewood, Pat Purdy, Richard and Karen C., The Everly Brothers' Father, Walt Disney, Artie De Gobineau and "Big" Jim Huberty.

== Track listing ==
1. "Invocation" – 2:23
2. "People" – 6:07
3. "The Hunter" – 0:47
4. "Nightwatch" – 3:07
5. "Disneyland can Wait" – 3:26
6. "An Eye for an Eye" – 5:10
7. "Down in the Willow Garden" – 2:56
8. "I'd Rather be Your Enemy" – 1:41
9. "Tripped a Beauteous Maiden" – 0:37
10. "As for the Fools" – 5:25
11. "Shadows of the Night" – 2:40
12. "History Lesson" – 3:27
13. "Silence is Golden" – 2:19
- "Bonus track" (available on reissue CD/picture disc) A sample of "one of the survivors of the Columbine shooting" played backwards to reveal: "Boyd Rice is the one who did it".

== Personnel ==
- Boyd Rice - vocals
- Douglas P. - guitar, backing vocals
- Tony Wakeford - bass guitar
- Rose McDowall - guitar and backing vocals
- Michael Moynihan - drums
- Bob Ferbrache - piano, surf zither, recording engineer

== Related information ==
- Live in Osaka (DVD) --Features a concert performance from Osaka, Japan, in 1989, with Michael Moynihan, Tony Wakeford, Douglas P., and Rose McDowell. Also includes films Invocation (One) and Black Sun.
