= Brown Book (album) =

Studio album by Death in June
- Released: 1987
- Genre: Neofolk; martial industrial; post-punk; dark ambient
- Length: 35:16
- Label: New European Recordings

Death in June chronology
The World That Summer (1986)	Brown Book (1987)	Östenbräun (1989)

Professional ratings
Review scores
Source	Rating
Allmusic	3/5 stars

Brown Book is an album by Death in June, released in 1987.

"To Drown A Rose" was released as a 10" single, backed with non-album tracks "Europa: The Gates of Heaven" and "Zimmerit". This single was later re-released as part of the 1989 compilation The Corn Years. The song features Rose McDowall on lead vocals.

The album is named after an index of West Germans who were previously involved in Germany's National Socialist government, compiled by East German authorities and published in 1965. Numerous songs on the album make extensive use of quotations from literature, including Jean Genet's 1948 novel Funeral Rites ("To Drown a Rose", "The Fog of the World"), and Yukio Mishima's 1969 novel Spring Snow ("Touch Defiles").

The sale of Brown Book has been prohibited in Germany since 2005 due to the title track's sampling of the "Horst-Wessel-Lied", the anthem of the Sturmabteilung. In response to the proposed ban, Douglas P. submitted statements to the German authorities explaining large passages of his work, including noting that the sample of "Horst-Wessel-Lied" was juxtaposed against samples from the film The World that Summer. The samples in question included that of a Jewish grandmother describing her "suicidal fatalism", and homophobic statements from her lover, an SA officer.

== Track listing ==
All tracks are written by Douglas P., except where noted.

Side One
No.	Title	Length
1.	"Heilige Tod"	0:59
2.	"Touch Defiles"	2:23
3.	"Hail! The White Grain"	4:14
4.	"Runes and Men"	2:59
5.	"To Drown a Rose"	4:28
6.	"Red Dog - Black Dog"	2:01

Side Two
No.	Title	Writer(s)	Length
7.	"The Fog of the World"		2:36
8.	"We are the Lust"	John Balance	4:36
9.	"Punishment Initiation"		3:23
10.	"Brown Book"		4:24
11.	"Burn Again"		2:03
Total length:			36:00

== Personnel ==
- Composed by: Death in June, John Balance (track B2)
- Featuring: Bee, David Tibet (as "Tibet 93"), Gary Carey, Iain O'Higgins (as "Jan O'"), Ian Read, John Balance, Rose McDowall
- Performer: Douglas P.
