= Take Care & Control =

Studio album by Death In June
- Released: 1998
- Genres: Martial industrial: dark ambient; experimental
- Length: 52:54
- Label: New European Recordings
- Producer: Dave Lokan

Death In June chronology
Heaven Sent (1996)	Take Care & Control (1998)	Operation Hummingbird (1999)

Take Care & Control is an album by Death in June, released in 1998. This album is a collaboration with Albin Julius (Der Blutharsch), with whom Douglas P. would return to collaborate on the Operation Hummingbird album. The tracks "Wolf Angel" and "Circo Massimo" were originally bonus tracks on the first press and Australian CD versions of the album, respectively. Both tracks have since been included in later reissues and on streaming.

== Track listing ==
=== Side 1 ===
1. "Smashed To Bits (In the Peace of the Night)" - 4:49
2. "Little Blue Butterfly" - 4:05
3. "The Bunker" - 3:08
4. "Kameradschaft" - 4:22
5. "Frost Flowers" - 3:11
6. "A Slaughter of Roses" - 3:13

=== Side 2 ===
1. "The November Men" - 7:44
2. "Power Has a Fragrance" - 3:47
3. "Despair" - 2:23
4. "The Odin Hour" - 4:00
5. "The Bunker, Empty" - 2:56
6. "Wolf Angel" - 3:02
7. "Circo Massimo" - 6:16

=== "Kameradschaft" ===
This exclusive 4-track CD single was included with the vinyl version of the album.

1. "Kameradschaft 1" - 4:01
2. "Satan's Feast" - 4:35
3. "Kameradschaft 2" - 4:02
4. "To Drown a Rose" (featuring John Balance on lead vocals) - 4:21
