= Swastikas for Noddy =

Studio album by Current 93
- Released: 1988
- Genre: Neofolk, psychedelic folk
- Length: 47:28
- Label: L.A.Y.L.A.H. Antirecords

Current 93 chronology
The Red Face of God (1988)	Swastikas for Noddy (1988)	Faith's Favorites (1988)

Swastikas for Noddy is a 1988 album by English music group Current 93.

This album marks a shift in the band's style, stepping away from their earlier electronic-industrial sound and introducing the acoustic folk elements that would come to characterize Current 93's music. It charted on New Musical Express's Independent LPs chart in March 1988.

The album was originally issued simultaneously on CD (with poor sound quality) and LP by Crepuscule Records' industrial subsidiary L.A.Y.L.A.H. Records. It was later reissued as a remastered CD by Durtro Records in 1994 (with significantly improved sound) under the slightly revised title "Swastikas For Goddy", the renaming being due to copyright infringement issues involving Enid Blyton's character Noddy.

“I was obsessed with Noddy,” recalled bandleader David Tibet in a 2011 interview, in reference to the album. “I took a load of acid on the top of the house where Rose McDowall was living and I had a vision of Noddy crucified in the sky and it really impressed me… as you would expect. The next day I just went mad for buying Noddy. Before I’d seen him crucified I wasn’t any more interested in him than any other kid who’s read Noddy as a child. I was taking such a huge amount of speed at the time that I had a massive amount of energy so I just started hoovering around and would come back with bin-liners full of anything with Noddy on. Rugs, mugs, jugs, didn’t matter, bought it all, to the extent that I started wandering around London wearing a red Noddy hat with a bell on the end. Which was possibly not a good move to make in terms of fashion”.

== Track listing ==
1. "Benediction" – 1:58
2. "Blessing" – 1:48
3. "North" – 0:38
4. "Black Sun Bloody Moon" – 0:54
5. "Oh Coal Black Smith" – 5:29
6. "Panzer Rune" – 5:26
7. "Black Flowers Please" – 3:43
8. "The Final Church" – 5:12
9. "The Summer of Love" – 1:54
10. "(Hey Ho) the Noddy / Goddy (Oh)" – 1:52
11. "Beausoleil" – 8:33
12. "Scarlet Woman" – 0:59
13. "Stair Song" – 0:25
14. "Angel" – 1:29
15. "Since Yesterday" – 4:04
16. "Valediction" – 1:00
17. "Malediction" – 2:04

== Personnel ==
- David Tibet (credited as Tibet 93) - vocals, production, mixing
- Douglas P. - guitar, drums, lead vocals (track 14), production, mixing
- John Balance - stick guitar, co-vocals (track 8)
- Rose McDowall - guitar, backing vocals, lead vocals (track 10), co-vocals (track 7)
- Boyd Rice - spoken vocals
- Steven Stapleton - harmonium, cello
- Hilmar Örn Hilmarsson (credited as HÖH) - harpsichord
- Ian Read - lead vocals (tracks 1 and 16)
- Freya Aswynn - lead vocals (tracks 2 and 3), co-vocals (tracks 6 and 10)
- Gary Carey - keyboards (track 15)
