= Fire Danger Season =

Box set by Der Blutharsch
- Released: 2003
- Recorded: 1997–2002
- Genre: Martial industrial, neofolk, neoclassical dark wave, industrial
- Label: Tesco

Der Blutharsch chronology
| When All Else Fails! (2002) | Fire Danger Season (2003) | Time Is Thee Enemy! (2004) |

Professional ratings
Review scores
| Source | Rating |
|---|---|
| Allmusic | (?) |

Fire Danger Season is a 4-CD box set released by Der Blutharsch. It is limited to 2,222 copies. The first 222 copies were special edition, packaged in a leather army satchel. The first disc is a special iron cross shaped cut out mini cd containing unreleased tracks. The second disc contains tracks released on various compilations. The third and fourth discs are Der Blutharsch tracks that are remixed by other artists.

== Track listing ==
All tracks are written by Der Blutharsch and guests

Disc 1: Previously Unreleased
| No. | Title | Length |
|---|---|---|
| 1. | "I" | 1:13 |
| 2. | "II" | 5:57 |
| 3. | "III" | 2:14 |
| 4. | "IV" | 2:38 |
| 5. | "V" | 3:37 |
| 6. | "VI" | 3:35 |
| Total length: | | 19:14 |

Disc 2: Compilation Releases
| No. | Title | Source | Length |
|---|---|---|---|
| 1. | "Untitled 1" | MM Compilation | 2:44 |
| 2. | "Untitled 2" | Previously Unreleased | 2:55 |
| 3. | "Untitled 3" | Unitiles split 7-inch | 3:46 |
| 4. | "Untitled 4" | Ten Years of Madness (Behind the Iron Curtain) compilation | 3:40 |
| 5. | "Untitled 5" | Heilige Feuer compilation | 2:50 |
| 6. | "Untitled 6" | Heilige Feuer compilation | 2:49 |
| 7. | "Untitled 7" | Wo Die Wilden Kerle Wohnen compilation | 4:11 |
| 8. | "Untitled 8" | The Pact:...Of the Gods compilation | 3:49 |
| 9. | "Untitled 9" | Lucifer Rising compilation | 3:09 |
| 10. | "Untitled 10" | Lucifer Rising compilation | 2:16 |
| 11. | "Untitled 11" | Der Tod im Juni | 5:00 |
| 12. | "Untitled 12" | Ain Soph and Der Blutharsch split 7-inch | 3:44 |
| 13. | "Untitled 13" | Eisteddfod compilation | 2:57 |
| 14. | "Untitled 14" (The Moment of Truth 10-inch) | | 2:57 |
| 15. | "Untitled 15" (Wenn Alle Brüder Schweigen 10-inch) | | 1:58 |
| Total length: | | | 48:00 |

Disc 3: Remixes I
| No. | Title | Length |
|---|---|---|
| 1. | "Untitled 1 (Tribe of Circle remix)" | 5:16 |
| 2. | "Untitled 2 (Sophia remix)" | 2:37 |
| 3. | "Untitled 3 (Bearer of the Inmost Sun remix)" | 5:43 |
| 4. | "Untitled 4 (Scivias remix)" | 6:12 |
| 5. | "Untitled 5 (Graumahd remix)" | 3:13 |
| 6. | "Untitled 6 (Con-Dom remix)" | 6:12 |
| 7. | "Untitled 7 (Deutsch Nepal remix)" | 8:36 |
| 8. | "Untitled 8 (Mushroom's Patience remix)" | 5:01 |
| 9. | "Untitled 9 (PAL remix)" | 4:54 |
| 10. | "Untitled 10 (His Divine Grace remix)" | 8:09 |
| Total length: | | 55:00 |

Disc 4: Remixes II
| No. | Title | Length |
|---|---|---|
| 1. | "Untitled 1 (Hybryds remix)" | 5:53 |
| 2. | "Untitled 2 (Apoptose remix)" | 4:51 |
| 3. | "Untitled 3 (I-C-K remix)" | 5:08 |
| 4. | "Untitled 4 (Novy Svet remix)" | 5:12 |
| 5. | "Untitled 5 (Decadence remix)" | 3:44 |
| 6. | "Untitled 6 (Derniere Volonte remix)" | 4:15 |
| 7. | "Untitled 7 (Of the Wand & the Moon: remix)" | 3:25 |
| 8. | "Untitled 8 (Death In June remix)" | 5:11 |
| 9. | "Untitled 9 (Wumpscut remix)" | 4:56 |
| 10. | "Untitled 10 (Mental Destruction remix)" | 5:24 |
| 11. | "Untitled 11 (C.D. Caspar.osp remix)" | 7:54 |
| Total length: | | 55:00 |
