= Ian Read (musician) =

English musician

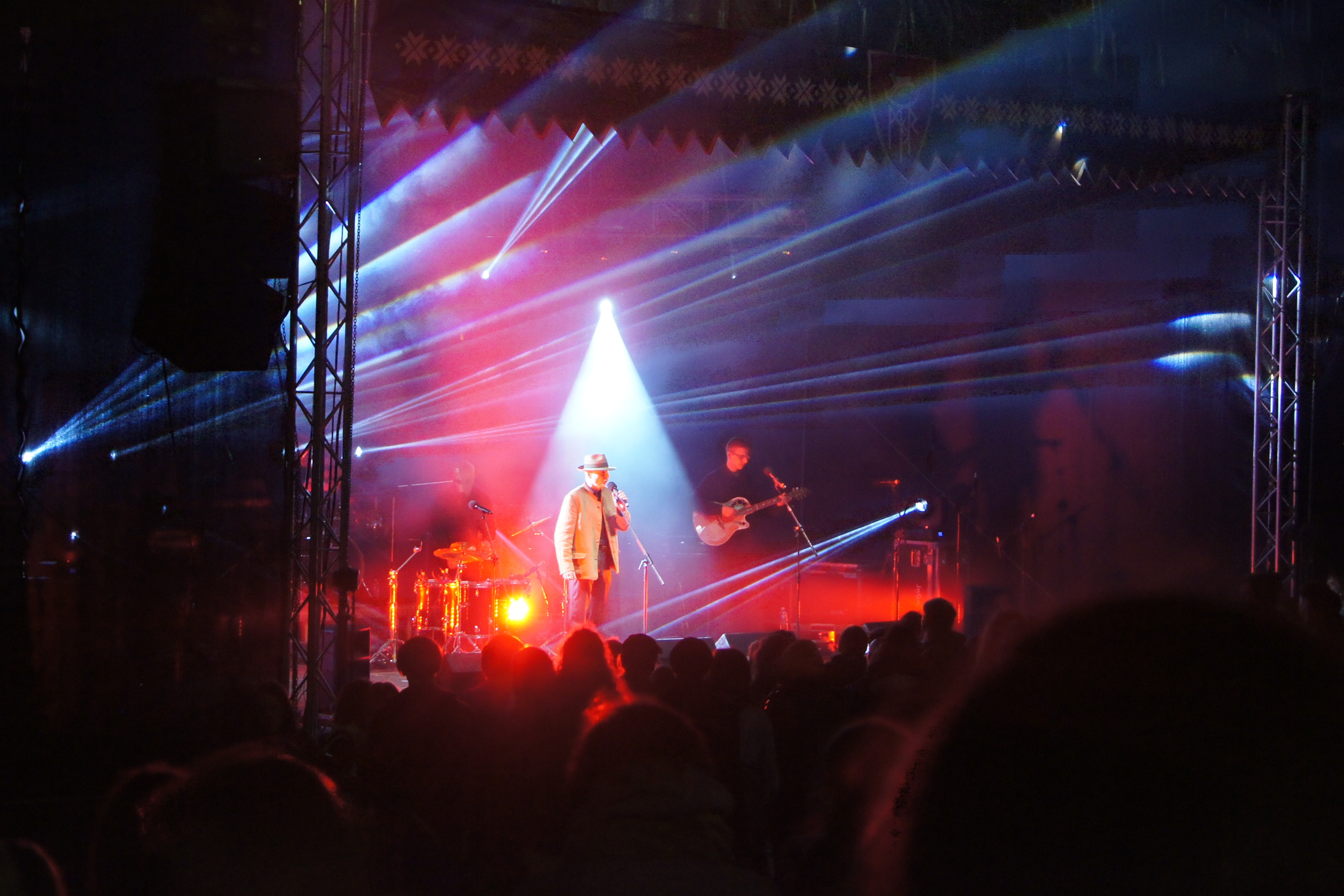
- Read performing in 2013

Background information
- Genres: Neofolk; folk
- Occupation(s): Musician, occultist
- Member of: Fire + Ice
- Formerly of: Sol Invictus

Ian Read is an English neofolk and traditional folk musician, and occultist active within chaos magic and Germanic mysticism circles. Read was a member of Sol Invictus, and founded Fire + Ice in 1991.

== Early life ==
Read left school at 16, and at the age of 17, he became an adherent of Germanic neopaganism and began studying Germanic paganism.

== Music career ==
In 1987, Read joined Tony Wakeford's Sol Invictus along with Karl Blake. Read recorded three albums and an EP with Sol Invictus before leaving to form the band Fire + Ice in 1991.

Ian Read founded an all traditional folk band named Figg's Academy that played a couple of gigs, notably in 2008 at the Wave-Gotik-Treffen in Leipzig.

=== Fire + Ice ===
Read founded Fire + Ice in 1991 after several years as a member of Sol Invictus. According to their sole website, "The heartlessness of the modern commercial consumer society ruins the lives of many. FIRE + ICE takes the purity and philosophy of early music and melds it into a message redolent with powerful seeds of honour, truth, loyalty and the bond of true friendship."

His work as Fire + Ice have had a large amount of influence on neofolk music.

The band played Wave-Gotik-Treffen in Leipzig in 1999 with a lineup that included Ysanne Spevack and Julia Kent.

The band followed up by releasing a split 7-inch single with the neofolk song The Unquiet Grave recorded in London in 2000, featuring vocals and viola by Ysanne Spevack as a duet with Ian Read. It was released in Germany by Tesco Distribution on blue vinyl with a letterpress foil gatefold cover.

== Other pursuits ==
In 1996, Read was named as a Rune-Master within the Rune-Gild. His master work was the Fire + Ice album Rûna that included a self-written and sung galdor (or galdr) of the Rune poem. Read presently holds the position of Drighten in the Rune Gild and co-published the periodical Rûna, which ceased after 24 issues.

Read became the leader of the English branch of the Illuminates of Thanateros (IOT), in the early 1990s after founder Peter Carroll stepped down as leading Magus. Read is currently the editor of the IOT's Chaos International.

== Discography ==
=== With Current 93 ===
He participated to the sessions of Current 93's album Swastikas For Noddy, therefore he appears on this album and some subsequent albums containing remixes of this material:

- Swastikas For Noddy, 1987
- Looney Runes, 1988
- Earth Covers Earth, 1988
- Crooked Crosses For The Nodding God, 1989
- Swastikas For Goddy, 1993

=== With Death In June ===
He participated to Death in June's album Brown Book and the tracks have appeared in subsequent Death In June's releases as well:

- Brown Book, 1987
- The Cathedral Of Tears , 1991
- Braun Buch Zwei, 2009

=== With Sol Invictus ===
- Lex Talionis, 1990
- Sol Veritas Lux, 1990, compilation of the tracks from the EPs Against the Modern World (1988) and In The Jaws Of The Serpent (1988)
- Trees In Winter, 1990

=== With Fire + Ice ===
==== Albums ====
Year	Title	Format, Special Notes	Label
1992	Gilded By The Sun	CD	New European Recordings
1994	Hollow Ways	CD	Fremdheit
1994	California Daze	Live CD with Charlie MacGowan	Discordia
1995	Midwinter Fires	CD	Fremdheit
1996	Rûna	CD	Fremdheit
1998	Seasons Of Ice	CD, compilation of rarities and unreleased tracks	Fremdheit
2000	Birdking	CD	Fremdheit
2012	Fractured Man	CD and Vinyl	Fremdheit
2018	Wanderer	10-inch Vinyl	Autre Que

==== EPs ====
Year	Title	Format, Special Notes	Label
1993	Blood On The Snow	CD Single	Fremdheit
1996	Reyn Again	7-inch	Fremdheit
2000	We Said Destroy	Split 7-inch with Death In June	Fremdheit

==== Videos ====
Year	Title	Label
1992	Live At Hammersmith	Chaos International
1995	Live At The Hollywood Moguls	Fremdheit

==== Compilations ====
Year	Tracks	Title	Format, Special Notes	Label
1996	Seeker's Prayer, Purity	The Pact: Flying In The Face...	CD	Fremdheit
1998	Noxialicht	The Nitha Fields	CD	Ultra!
2000	Harry the sun	The Pact: ...Of The Gods	CD	Fremdheit
2004	Michael	Tyr II	CD included with magazine.	Ultra!
2005	Dragons in the sunset	Looking For Europe	4×CD set.	Auerbach Tonträger

== See also ==
- Neopagan music
