= Terra Incognita: Ambient Works 1975 to Present =

Compilation album by Boyd Rice/NON
- Released: August 23, 2004
- Label: Mute

Boyd Rice/NON chronology
| Children of the Black Sun (2002) | Terra Incognita: Ambient Works 1975 to Present (2004) | Alarm Agents (2004) |

Terra Incognita: Ambient Works 1975 to Present is a compilation of Boyd Rice music previously released under his own name as well as his alias NON.

== Credits ==
- Artwork By - Louise Downer
- Compiled By - Boyd Rice
- Edited By, Mastered By [Premastering] - Anne Carruthers, Paul A. Taylor
- Engineer - Eric Radcliffe (tracks: 2, 11, 12), John Fryer (tracks: 2, 11, 12)
- Mastered By - Denis Blackham
- Other [Liner Notes] - Brian M. Clark
- Photography - Boyd Rice
- Recorded By - Naut Humon (tracks: 4), Bob Ferbreche (tracks: 6, 11)
- Written-By - Boyd Rice, Frank Tovey (tracks: 2, 11, 12), NON (tracks: 1, 3 to 10, 13)

== Track listing ==
1. "Solitude" - 3:14
2. "Extract 4" - 2:16
3. "Father's Day" - 5:44
4. "Immolation Of Man" - 4:32
5. "Sunset" - 3:38
6. "Arka" - 4:36
7. "Cruenta Voluptas" - 2:19
8. "Untitled 1" - 5:16
9. "A Taste Of Blood" - 2:14
10. "Untitled 2" - 4:56
11. "Extract 5" - 2:18
12. "Extract 12" - 4:12
13. "The Fountain Of Fortune" - 6:00
