= Pagan Muzak =

EP by NON
- Released: 1978
- Recorded: 1977 or 1978
- Genre: Industrial, noise
- Length: 17:00
- Label: Graybeat

NON chronology
Mode of Infection/Knife Ladder (1977)	Pagan Muzak (1978)	Physical Evidence (1982)

Pagan Muzak is an industrial-noise 7" vinyl released by NON. The release was pressed with 17 tracks of locked grooves and includes an off center hole drilled for an alternate method of play.

== Releases ==
The album was first pressed in 1978 via Graybeat Records. This pressing was a 7" record housed in a 12" sleeve containing 17 tracks on side A, with side B blank. In 1981, Graybeat Records repressed the record, however, both side A and B of the record now included the same 17 tracks. On September 27, 1999, The Grey Area re-pressed the album in an identical manner to the first pressing, with side B blank, and only a standard single center hole.

== Track listing ==
Side A

1. (untitled)
2. (untitled)
3. (untitled)
4. (untitled)
5. (untitled)
6. (untitled)
7. (untitled)
8. (untitled)
9. (untitled)
10. (untitled)
11. (untitled)
12. (untitled)
13. (untitled)
14. (untitled)
15. (untitled)
16. (untitled)
17. (untitled)

Side B

- Side B is either blank or includes the same tracks as Side A, depending on the pressing.
