= God & Beast =

Album by Boyd Rice

Studio album by NON
- Released: 9 December 1997
- Genre: Noise, industrial, experimental
- Length: 66:40 (see note below)
- Label: Mute
- Producer: Ken Thomas

NON chronology
Might! (1995)	God & Beast (1997)	Receive the Flame (1999)

Professional ratings
Review scores
Source	Rating
Allmusic	3/5 stars

God & Beast is a 1997 album of Boyd Rice's NON.

It was released by Mute Records (UK) on CD.

== Personnel ==
Boyd Rice wrote all tracks and provided vocals and sound construction. Douglas P. provided vocals, played chimes and E-bow. Rose McDowall provided vocals. Dave Simmons played keyboards.

== Liner notes ==
"In a Promethean sense, man is a God. But on an even more profound level, man is a beast. This primary contradiction has plagued mankind for millennia. Man is a God. Man is a beast. These two aspects of his personality have been waging war with one another for countless centuries; a war whose casualties are seen everywhere and recognized nowhere. But there exists, however, a long forgotten place in the soul where God and beast intersect. To go to that place is to witness the death of one world and the birth of another...join me."

== Track listing ==
1. "God & Beast"
2. "Between Venus & Mars"
3. "Millstones"
4. "The Coming Forth"
5. "The Law"
6. "Lucifer, The Morning Star"
7. "Out Out Out"
8. "Phoenix"
9. "Total War"
- There are two ghost tracks, the first being the reading of a poem, the second an instrumental piece. A sudden loud scream anticipates them after 13 minutes from the end of track 9.
