= All Pigs Must Die (album) =

Studio album by Death in June
- Released: 2001
- Recorded: October 2000 – January 2001
- Studios: Big Sound Studios; Geyer Studios; Jacobs Studios
- Genres: Neofolk; experimental; power electronics; noise
- Length: 39:14
- Label: Leprosy
- Producer: Dave Lokan

Death in June chronology
Operation Hummingbird (1999)	All Pigs Must Die (2001)	Alarm Agents (2004)

Alternative cover
- Alternate cover used on some vinyl releases

All Pigs Must Die is an album by Death in June, released in 2001. The record consists of two parts: the first half of the album bears the typical later Death in June neofolk sound, whereas the second half of the album has a much more chaotic and noise-infused experimental sound to it.

Ewan Burke of Cyclic Defrost wrote that the album was "undoubtedly the strangest work in Death In June’s oeuvre".

== Track listing ==
1. "All Pigs Must Die" - 3:00
2. "Tick Tock" - 3:16
3. "Disappear in Every Way" - 2:47
4. "The Enemy Within" - 3:43
5. "We Said Destroy II" - 3:51
6. "Flies Have Their House" - 4:11
7. "With Bad Blood" - 4:12
8. "No Pig Day (Some Night We're Going to Party Like it's 1969)" - 3:28
9. "We Said Destroy III" - 4:09
10. "Lords of the Sties" - 2:56
11. "Ride Out!" - 3:46

== Personnel ==
- Douglas P - vocals, guitars, noise, keyboards
- Andreas Ritter - accordion, flute (tracks 1 to 6)
- Campbell Finley - trumpet (tracks 1, 3, 5, and 6)
- Boyd Rice - vocals (spoken word) (tracks 2 and 5)
