= Free Tibet (album) =

Studio album by Death in June & David Tibet
- Released: 3 September 2006
- Length: 39:30

Death In June chronology
Alarm Agents (2004)	Free Tibet (2006)	The Rule of Thirds (2008)

Free Tibet is an mp3 compilation by Death in June featuring David Tibet on vocals. The album was made available for free download in 2006 through the Death in June website. In 2016, a limited edition CD release of 1,000 copies was released through Leprosy Discs, a sub-label of NER, in response to a number of bootlegs having appeared on the market in years prior.

== Track listing ==
1. "Death Books I" - 5:55
2. "This Is Paradise I" - 4:41
3. "Love Books" - 4:12
4. "Jerusalem The Black" - 2:56
5. "Daedalus Falling" - 4:53
6. "Death Books II" - 5:56
7. "This Is Paradise II" - 10:57
