= Operation Hummingbird (album) =

Studio album by Death in June
- Released: 1999
- Recorded: June – July 1999
- Genre: Martial industrial; dark ambient; experimental
- Length: 28:11
- Label: New European Recordings

Death in June chronology
Take Care & Control (1998)	Operation Hummingbird (1999)	All Pigs Must Die (2001)

Professional ratings
Review scores
Source	Rating
AllMusic	3/5 stars

Operation Hummingbird is a studio album by Death In June, released in 1999.

The album contains seven new songs recorded with Albin Julius of Der Blutharsch. It is considered a smaller, sister album to Take Care & Control.

== Critical reception ==
AllMusic thought that "led by chanting vocals, 'The Snows of the Enemy (Little Black Baby)' and 'Let a Wind Catch a Rainbow on Fire' are eerily reminiscent of Britain's pre-Christian past."

== Track listing ==
1. "Gorilla Tactics" – 1:45
2. "Kapitulation" – 3:09
3. "Flieger" – 6:02
4. "The Snows of the Enemy (Little Black Baby)" – 6:15
5. "Hand Grenades and Olympic Flames" – 2:58
6. "Winter Eagle" – 3:53
7. "Let the Wind Catch a Rainbow on Fire" – 4:07
