= The World That Summer =

Studio album by Death in June
- Released: 1986
- Recorded: 1985 – 1986
- Genre: Neofolk; martial industrial; post-punk; experimental
- Length: 67:01
- Label: New European Recordings

Death in June chronology
| Nada! (1985) | The World That Summer (1986) | Brown Book (1987) |

Professional ratings
Review scores
| Source | Rating |
|---|---|
| Allmusic | 4/5 stars |

The World That Summer (or The Wörld Thät Sümmer, as it appears on the album packaging), is an album by Death in June, released in 1986.

Originally recorded between 1985 and 1986 and previously available only on LP format, The World That Summer was reissued on CD digipack packaging complete with varnished cover artwork and a booklet with photos and lyrics in 2000.

Douglas P. is accompanied on this album by David Tibet (as Christ'777') and Andrea James (part of the duo 'Somewhere in Europe').

== Track listing ==
=== Side 1 ===
1. "Blood of Winter" - 4:09
2. "Hidden Among the Leaves" - 4:29
3. "Torture by Roses" - 3:31
4. "Come Before Christ and Murder Love" - 4:26
5. "Love Murder" - 5:08

=== Side 2 ===
1. "Rule Again" - 4:02
2. "Break the Black Ice" - 4:06
3. "Rocking Horse Night" - 3:39
4. "Blood Victory" - 5:17

=== Side 3 ===
1. "Death of a Man" - 15:28

=== Side 4 ===
1. "Reprise #1" - 3:23
2. "Reprise #2" - 4:05
3. "Reprise #3" - 5:21
