= Rose Clouds of Holocaust =

Studio album by Death In June
- Released: 1995
- Recorded: April, October–December 1994
- Studio: Jacob's Studios, Farnham, England
- Genre: Neofolk
- Length: 38:56
- Label: New European Recordings
- Producer: Douglas P., Ken Thomas

Death In June chronology
But, What Ends When the Symbols Shatter? (1992)	Rose Clouds of Holocaust (1995)	Death in June Presents: Occidental Martyr (1996)

Professional ratings
Review scores
Source	Rating
AllMusic	4.5/5 stars

Rose Clouds Of Holocaust is a 1995 album by the English neofolk project Death In June, released through New European Recordings.

== Track listing ==
All tracks are written by Douglas Pearce.

Side A
No.	Title	Length
1.	"Lord Winter"	1:23
2.	"God's Golden Sperm"	4:19
3.	"Omen-Filled Season"	4:07
4.	"Symbols of the Sun"	3:36
5.	"Jerusalem the Black"	2:54

Side B
No.	Title	Length
6.	"Luther's Army"	3:58
7.	"13 Years of Carrion"	5:50
8.	"The Accidental Protégé"	4:53
9.	"Rose Clouds of Holocaust"	3:15
10.	"Lifebooks"	4:41
Total length:		38:56

== Personnel ==
- Douglas P. – all instrumentation, vocals, lyrics, engineering, production
- Ken Thomas – engineering, production
- Dave Lokan – engineering (track 1, 3, 6)
- Simon Norris – vibraphone, melodica (track 3, 7, 8), backing vocals (track 2)
- Max Wearing – vocals (track 1), backing vocals (track 6)
- Rose McDowall – backing vocals (track 4, 7)
- David Tibet – vocals (track 5, 10)
- Campbell Finley – trumpet (track 7)
