= Wolf Pact =

Studio album by Boyd Rice & Fiends
- Released: July 20, 2001
- Recorded: Recorded at Big Sound Studios, Lenswood, South Australia, February 2001
- Genres: Electronic, experimental, ambient
- Length: 45:32
- Label: Neroz

Wolf Pact is an album by Boyd Rice & Fiends (in this collaboration, Douglas P. and Albin Julius).

== CD pressing ==
Limited to 500 copies and signed by Douglas P. & Boyd Rice.

Pressing:

- Record label: Neroz
- Catalog number: NEROZ CD1369

=== Track listing ===
1. "Watery Leviathan" - 2:29
2. "The Forgotten Father" - 2:55
3. "Tomb Of The Forgotten Father" - 2:43
4. "Wolf Pact" - 3:29
5. "Worlds Collide" - 5:01
6. "Their Bad Blood" - 3:12
7. "Rex Mundi" - 2:55
8. "Murder Bag" - 4:35
9. "The Reign Song" - 2:39
10. "Joe Liked To Go (To The Cemetery)" - 3:58
11. "Fire Shall Come" - 3:39
12. "The Orchid And The Death's Head" - 7:31
13. "For Their Whole Lives Long" - 0:26

== 12" vinyl pressing ==
Released in white and grey vinyl with 750 copies of each. Comes with printed inner sleeve and embossed cover.

Pressing:

- Record label: Neroz
- Catalog number: NEROZ 1369

=== Track listing ===
Side A

1. "Watery Leviathan"
2. "The Forgotten Father"
3. "Tomb Of The Forgotten Father"
4. "Wolf Pact"
5. "Worlds Collide"
6. "We Shall Purge"
7. "Rex Mundi"

Side B

1. "Murder Bag"
2. "The Reign Song"
3. "Joe Liked To Go (To The Cemetery)"
4. "Fire Shall Come"
5. "The Orchid And The Death's Head"
6. "For Their Whole Lives Long"
7. "Marglar"

== Boyd Rice & Fiends — The Registered Three, CD single ==
Limited to 500 copies and signed by Douglas P. & Boyd Rice.

Pressing:

- Record Label: Neroz
- Catalog number: NEROZ 45

=== Track listing ===
1. "The Forgotten Father" - 2:59
2. "People Change" - 2:40
3. "The Registered Three" - 2:10
