= Douglas P. =

British musician

- Douglas Pearce (masked) performing for Death in June c. 1990s

Background information
- Also known as: Douglas P.
- Born: Douglas Pearce; 27 April 1956 (age 70); Sheerwater, Woking, Surrey, England
- Origin: Guildford, Surrey, England
- Genres: Post-punk, neofolk, experimental, dark ambient, martial industrial, punk rock
- Occupations: Musician, songwriter, producer
- Instrument: Acoustic guitar
- Years active: 1977–present
- Label: New European Recordings
- Website: http://www.deathinjune.net/

Douglas Pearce (born 27 April 1956), known professionally as Douglas P., is a British musician, best known for his neofolk project Death in June. He was born in Sheerwater in Woking, Surrey and lives in Adelaide, Australia, which has been his home since the mid-1990s.

== Early life ==
Pearce was born on 27 April 1956 and grew up in Sheerwater, a suburb of Woking in Surrey which he said was a "white, working-class ghetto"; his father worked as a courier for the military and had served in World War II in the Royal Air Force where he was wounded in action. Both of Pearce's parents were English, though his mother claimed Scots-Irish ancestry. Pearce described his family life as a "very unhappy, dysfunctional family".

Pearce developed an interest in music at a young age, according to the 2005 documentary Death in June: Behind the Mask, Pearce grew up listening to music on Six-Five Special, a British television programme. Pearce's father died of a heart attack at age 56 when Pearce was 14. Pearce grew up in what he describes as "a very militaristic environment, surrounded by war"; he says that he "had a natural attraction to war". At the age of 18 Pearce left home, went hitchhiking around Europe and "came home a changed man". For a time Pearce worked as a mail carrier in order to fund his music career and photography hobby.

As a child, Pearce was exorcised by his parents for alleged demonic possession, and after his father died, Pearce and his mother would "muck around with a Ouija board". Pearce believes in the paranormal and occult, and claims to have had contact with various entities saying "I believe in gods, demons, angels whether they're from the inner psyche, another dimension or whatever. I've heard them and I've seen them. I've even felt them touch me". Pearce stated in a 2000 interview that he was first introduced to reading Aleister Crowley, specifically Crowley's 1904 book The Book of the Law by David Tibet in 1983.

== Career ==
=== Origins ===
In 1975 partially inspired by existentialism and The 400 Blows, a 1959 French New Wave film, Pearce began to dress in all black, cut his hair short, and began to follow and listen to punk rock including British bands such as Sex Pistols, The Clash, Siouxsie and the Banshees, and the Buzzcocks. It was around this time that Pearce was introduced to Tony Wakeford, also from Woking, and began to play opening acts for various pub rock scenes.

=== Crisis ===
In 1977 Pearce began his musical career in a British punk band called Crisis. Crisis played its final show on 10 May 1980 in Guildford, following this the band split up. After Crisis disbanded in 1980, Pearce formed Death in June with Crisis bandmate Tony Wakeford (currently of the English folk noir band, Sol Invictus) and Patrick O'Kill né Leagas (now a member of the English band Mother Destruction).

=== Death in June ===
According to an interview with Compulsion, a music journal, in 1985 Douglas P. became the sole constant member of Death in June, with rotating guest musicians serving as collaborators and live band members. Pearce continues to work under the Death in June moniker.

=== New European Recordings ===
Pearce has released numerous recordings of musical work of his own and others under his New European Recordings label since 1981.

=== Neofolk ===
Pearce was highly influential in the creation of a musical movement often referred to as neofolk, often collaborating and playing live with various artists within the genre. He was a guitarist, drummer and occasional vocalist for experimental music group Current 93.

=== Use of Nazi symbolism ===
Since a young age Pearce had an affinity for Nazi memorabilia as his father and uncles all fought in World War II. Pearce also has an interest in runes, Norse mythology, medieval symbology, and heraldry. According to PureHoney magazine, this interest in niche symbology has led to multiple venue cancellations, banned albums, and lyric censorship, as was the case with the 1987 album Brown Book, which was banned in Germany due to Germany's bans on Nazi symbols. According to the 2005 documentary Death in June: Behind the Mask, Pearce's first item he ever bought was a Wehrmacht tropical tunic with proceeds from his job as a paperboy. He later purchased and refurbished a German Stahlhelm, much to his family's disapproval.

This interest in German militaria later boiled over into Pearce's musical career, particularly with Death in June, by utilizing Nazi symbolism such as German World War II camouflage patterns, the Black Sun, the Totenkopf, and the Wolfsangel, among others. Although Pearce utilizes this symbology for its shock value, similar to other bands of the 1980s including Joy Division, New Order, Throbbing Gristle, and Ramones, an essay by The Big Takeover magazine clarifies that although closely related to political extremists such as Boyd Rice, Pearce is not a neo-nazi.

== Personal life ==
Douglas P. is openly gay, and says that "being gay is fundamental to Death in June"; he expresses discontent with that side of Death in June not being explored in interviews. He said in an interview he admires the work and lives of Yukio Mishima and Jean Genet "not only because their work was brilliant but that they were also gay". According to the 1995 book Death in June: Misery and Purity by Robert Forbes, Pearce stated in several interviews that Funeral Rites by Genet and The Decay of the Angel by Mishima are two of his favorite books.

== Religious views ==
Although Pearce does not subscribe to a specific religion, Pearce has stated on several occasions that he believes in the paranormal, deities, the occult, and some aspects of spirituality. In a 1998 interview with the publication Scapegoat, Pearce stated that "I feel it is part of my duty to be part of the process of resurrection for want of a better word [sic] of my indigenous religion. The Christ-time is nearly over and it’s important to awaken the old Gods". In the same interview Pearce states that he was never baptized as a child, "so Jesus Christ has never meant anything to me".

== Political views ==
In 2017, Oregon record label Soleilmoon Recordings was listed on the Southern Poverty Law Center's hate group registry for distributing albums by Death in June, and Boyd Rice's project NON. Charles Powne, the label's owner, denied that Soleilmoon was racist, and said that Pearce and Rice are not racist either. The SPLC pointed out a 1996 quote from Pearce where he proudly aligned with Eurocentrism: "I am totally Eurocentric. I'm not overly concerned with the past but I do care about the present and the future. European culture, morals, ethics, whatever are under attack from all sides these days." In a 2000 interview Pearce stated that he and Tony Wakeford were determined to keep Death in June out of politics. While Pearce and Wakeford were both vehemently anti-fascist and worked with the Anti-Nazi League while in Crisis, Pearce stated that "the preoccupations of the masses left a very bad taste in our mouths. Death in June has never done that".

== Discography ==
Year	Title	Format, Special Notes	Artist
1978	No Town Hall	7"	Crisis
1979	UK 79/White Youth	7"	Crisis
1980	Hymns of Faith	LP	Crisis
1981	Alienation	7"	Crisis
1981	Heaven Street	12"	Death in June
1982	State Laughter/Holy Water	7"	Death in June
1983	The Guilty Have No Pride	LP	Death in June
1984	Burial	LP	Death in June
1984	She Said Destroy	12"/7"	Death in June
1985	Nada!	LP	Death in June
1985	Born Again	12"	Death in June
1985	Come Before Christ And Murder Love	12"/7"	Death in June
1986	The World That Summer	2xLP	Death in June
1986	Lesson 1: Misanthropy	LP	Death in June
1987	To Drown A Rose	10"	Death in June
1987	Brown Book	LP	Death in June
1987	Oh How We Laughed	Live LP/CD, semi-official.	Death in June
1987	Happy Birthday	12"	Current 93
1987	Dawn	LP	Current 93
1988	The Red Face of God	12"	Current 93
1988	Christ and the Pale Queens Mighty in Sorrow	LP	Current 93
1988	Earth Covers Earth	LP	Current 93
1988	Swastikas For Noddy	LP	Current 93
1989	93 Dead Sunwheels	EP/CD	Death in June
1989	The Corn Years	CD	Death in June
1989	She Is Dead and All Fall Down	7"	Current 93
1989	Swastikas For Noddy	LP	Current 93
1989	Crooked Crosses for the Nodding God	LP	Current 93
1989	Music, Martinis, & Misanthropy	LP	Boyd Rice and Friends
1990	The Wall of Sacrifice	LP/CD	Death in June
1990	1888	EP	Death in June
1990	Looney Runes	LP	Current 93
1991	The Cathedral of Tears	CD	Death in June
1992	Ostenbraun	2x cassette/CD	Death in June & Les Joyaux De La Princesse
1992	But, What Ends When The Symbols Shatter?	LP/CD	Death in June
1992	Paradise Rising	12"/CDS	Death in June
1992	In the Shadow of the Sword (live)	LP	NON
1992	Death in June/Current 93/Sol Invictus	CD, previously a bootleg before official release.	Death in June
1992	Gilded by the Sun	CD	Fire + Ice
1992	Gestures	CD	Somewhere in Europe
1992	Thunder Perfect Mind	CD/LP	Current 93
1993	Cathedral of Tears	12"/CDS	Death in June
1993	Something Is Coming	2xLP/2xCD	Death in June
1993	Hitler as Kalki (live)	LP	Current 93
1994	Sun Dogs	7"/CDS	Death in June
1994	Beauty Reaps The Blood of Solitude	CD	Nature & Organisation
1994	Dark Rose	7"	Strength Through Joy
1995	Rose Clouds of Holocaust	LP/CD	Death in June
1995	Black Whole of Love	CDS 7", 10", 12" box set	Death in June
1995	Death in June Presents: Occidental Martyr	CD/10"	Occidental Martyr
1995	The Force of Truth And Lies	CD	Strength Through Joy
1996	Death in June Presents: KAPO!	LP/CD	Death in June
1996	Heaven Sent	LP	Scorpion Wind
1996	Salute To Light	2CD	Strength Through Joy
1997	Die Schuldigen und der Nebel	2xCD box set, previously a bootleg before official release.	Death in June
1997	DISCriminate ('81-'97)	2xCD, "a compilation of personal choice," previously released material.	Death in June
1997	God and Beast	LP	NON
1997	Sulphur – Low Seed Replication	CD	Splinter Test
1997	Despiritualisation of Nature	CD	Tehom
1998	Take Care & Control	LP/CD	Death in June
1998	Kameradschaft	CDS	Death in June
1998	Passion! Power!! Purge!!!	CDS	Death in June
1999	Der Tod Im Juni	CD	Death in June
1999	Heilige!	CD	Death in June
2000	Operation Hummingbird	LP/CD	Death in June
2000	We Said Destroy	7"	Death in June & Fire + Ice
2000	Birdking	CD	Fire + Ice
2000	The Way I Feel	CD	Boyd Rice
2000	Theriomorphic Spirit	CD	Tehom
2001	All Pigs Must Die	LP/CD	Death in June
2001	Wolf Pact	LP	Boyd Rice and Fiends (sic)
2003	Windzeit	CD	Forseti
2004	Alarm Agents	LP/Coloured Vinyl/CD	Death in June & Boyd Rice
2004	Live in Osaka	CD	NON
2004	Trephanus Uhr	CD	Luftwaffe
2004	Blacksun Rising	CD	Projekt Thule
2005	Abandon Tracks	2xLP/CD. Rare and previously unreleased material.	Death in June
2005	The Doctor	2xLP/CD. Contains spoken material by Pearce.	Thomas Nola et son Orchestre
2008	Agony & Irony	CD. Contains spoken material by Pearce on song I Found Away	Alkaline Trio
2008	The Rule of Thirds	2x10"/CD	Death in June
2010	Peaceful Snow	2x10"/CD	Death in June
2013	The Snow Bunker Tapes	LP/CD	Death in June
2018	Essence!	LP/CD	Death in June
2022	Nada-Ized!	LP/CD	Death in June
