= But, What Ends When the Symbols Shatter? =

Studio album by Death in June
- Released: 1992
- Genre: Neofolk
- Length: 46:18
- Label: New European Recordings

Death in June chronology
The Wall of Sacrifice (1990)	But, What Ends When the Symbols Shatter? (1992)	Rose Clouds of Holocaust (1995)

Professional ratings
Review scores
Source	Rating
Allmusic	link

But, What Ends When The Symbols Shatter? is an album by Death in June, released in 1992. The first edition was issued as a gold disc in a white digipak with the artwork on the enclosed booklet.

"He's Disabled", "The Mourner's Bench", "Because of Him", and "Little Black Angel" are covers/re-interpretations of songs from Jim Jones' People's Temple Choir 1973 gospel album He's Able. The original songs were "He's Able", "Something's Got a Hold of Me", "Because of Him", and "Black Baby", respectively.

The album cover photography of a statue was taken in Foro Italico.

== Track listing ==
1. "Death is the Martyr of Beauty" – 3:50
2. "He's Disabled" – 4:08
3. "The Mourner's Bench" – 2:31
4. "Because of Him" – 3:46
5. "Dædalus Rising" – 4:52
6. "Little Black Angel" – 4:18
7. "The Golden Wedding of Sorrow" – 3:36
8. "The Giddy Edge of Light" – 5:07
9. "Ku Ku Ku" – 1:52
10. "This is not Paradise" – 5:27
11. "Hollows of Devotion" – 3:29
12. "But, What Ends When the Symbols Shatter?" – 3:15
