= Funeral Rites (novel) =

1948 novel by Jean Genet

- First edition
- Author: Jean Genet
- Original title: Pompes funèbres
- Translator: Bernard Frechtman
- Language: French
- Publisher: Marc Barbezat - L'Arbalete (Original French), Grove Press (English Translation)
- Publication date: 1948
- Publication place: France
- English publication date: 1953
- Media type: Print
- ISBN: 0-571-25154-4
- Preceded by: The Miracle of the Rose
- Followed by: Querelle of Brest

Funeral Rites (Pompes funèbres) is a 1948 novel by Jean Genet. It is a story of love and betrayal across political divides, written this time for the narrator's lover, Jean Decarnin, killed by the Germans in World War II.

The first edition was limited to 1,500 copies; in 1953 the text was revised by Gallimard, excising some possibly offensive passages, which became the basis for the 1953 English translation by Frechtman.
