= Nada! =

Studio album by Death in June
- Released: 12 October 1985
- Recorded: 1984−1985
- Genre: Post-punk; gothic rock; industrial; neofolk
- Length: 38:12
- Label: New European Recordings
- Producer: Death in June and Tibet 93

Death in June chronology
| Burial (1984) | Nada! (1985) | The World That Summer (1986) |

Professional ratings
Review scores
| Source | Rating |
|---|---|
| AllMusic | 4/5 stars |

Nada! is the third studio album by English neofolk band Death in June. It was released on 12 October 1985 through record label New European Recordings.

== Track listing ==
All tracks are written by Death in June (Christ '93', Douglas Pearce, Patrick Leagas, Richard Butler), except as noted.

Side A
| No. | Title | Writer(s) | Length |
|---|---|---|---|
| 1. | "The Honour of Silence" | | 3:17 |
| 2. | "The Calling (Mk II)" | | 5:32 |
| 3. | "Leper Lord" | Christ | 1:13 |
| 4. | "Rain of Despair" | | 4:21 |
| 5. | "Foretold" | | 4:49 |

Side B
| No. | Title | Writer(s) | Length |
|---|---|---|---|
| 1. | "Behind the Rose (Fields of Rape)" | Christ | 2:46 |
| 2. | "She Said Destroy" | Christ | 3:32 |
| 3. | "Carousel" | | 4:46 |
| 4. | "C'est un rêve" | | 3:24 |
| 5. | "Crush My Love" | | 4:13 |

== Personnel ==
Death in June

- Christ '93' (David Tibet)
- Douglas Pearce
- Patrick Leagas
- Richard Butler

Technical

- Porky – mastering
