= Alarm Agents =

Studio album by Death In June & Boyd Rice
- Released: 2004
- Label: New European Recordings

Death In June chronology
All Pigs Must Die (2001)	Alarm Agents (2004)	Free Tibet (2006)

Boyd Rice chronology
Terra Incognita: Ambient Works 1975 to Present (2004)	Alarm Agents (2004)

Alarm Agents is an album by Death in June & Boyd Rice.

== CD version ==
=== Credits ===
- Guitar, Keyboards, Backing Vocals – Douglas Pearce
- Lead Vocals – Boyd Rice
- Percussion – Jonh Murphy
- Recorded By – Dave Lokan (tracks: 11), Mark Hamill (tracks: 4, 14, 16), Robert Ferbrache (tracks: 1 to 3, 5 to 10, 12, 13, 15, 17, 18)

=== Studios ===
Recorded between Halloween, October 2002 and Mid-Winter's Night, December 2003. All tracks conceived and recorded at Absinthe Studios, Denver, U.S.A., except for 4, 14 and 16, which were recorded at New Centurion Studios, Wellington, New Zealand, and 11 which was recorded at Big Sound Studios, Adelaide, Australia.

The CD is packaged in an embossed digipak.

== LP version ==
=== Pressing & version ===
The LP version is limited to 1,600 colours; 800 come in clear green vinyl. Only the LP contains the complete versions of the songs and complete different mix from the CD. The vinyl etching on side A says "The storm is no longer...", while side B says "...out at sea !".

=== Credits ===
- Guitar, Keyboards, Backing Vocals – Douglas Pearce
- Lead Vocals – Boyd Rice
- Percussion – Jonh Murphy
- Recorded By – Dave Lokan (tracks: B2), Mark Hamill (tracks: A3, B5), Robert Ferbrache (tracks: A1, A2, A4 to B1, B3, B4, B6, B7)

=== Studios ===
Recorded between Halloween, October 2002 and Mid-Winter's Night, December 2003. All tracks conceived and recorded at Absinthe Studios, Denver, U.S.A., except for A3 and B5, which were recorded at New Centurion Studios, Wellington, New Zealand, and B2 which was recorded at Big Sound Studios, Adelaide, Australia.

== Track listing ==
=== CD ===
1. "Untouchable" – 1:01
2. "Black Sun Rising" – 3:41
3. "You Love the Sun" – 1:25
4. "Tears of the Hunted" – 4:00
5. "You Love the Sun, Don't You?" – 2:38
6. "Storm on the Sea (Out Beyond Land)" – 5:27
7. "You Love the Sun and the Moon" – 0:22
8. "Summer is Gone" – 3:41
9. "Deeper Than Love" – 4:16
10. "An Ancient Tale is Told" – 1:44
11. "Are You Out There? (Dornier 17 Mix)" – 6:23
12. "Sunwheels of Your Mind" – 0:55
13. "Get Used to Saying No!" – 6:51
14. "Symbols in Souls" – 3:38
15. "An Ancient Tale is Told Again" – 1:29
16. "The Man Who Laughs" – 4:39
17. "We're All a Little Afraid" – 0:23
18. "Boyd's Gift" – 0:29

=== 12" ===
Side A:

1. "Untouchable"
2. "Black Sun Rising"
3. "Tears of the Hunted"
4. "You Love the Sun, Don't You?"
5. "Storm on the Sea (Out Beyond Land)"
6. "Summer is Gone"

Side B:

1. "Deeper Than Love"
2. "Are You Out There?"
3. "Sunwheels of Your Mind"
4. "Get Used to Saying No!"
5. "Symbols in Souls"
6. "An Ancient Tale is Told"
7. "Boyd's Gift"
