= Albin Julius =

Austrian musician (1967–2022)

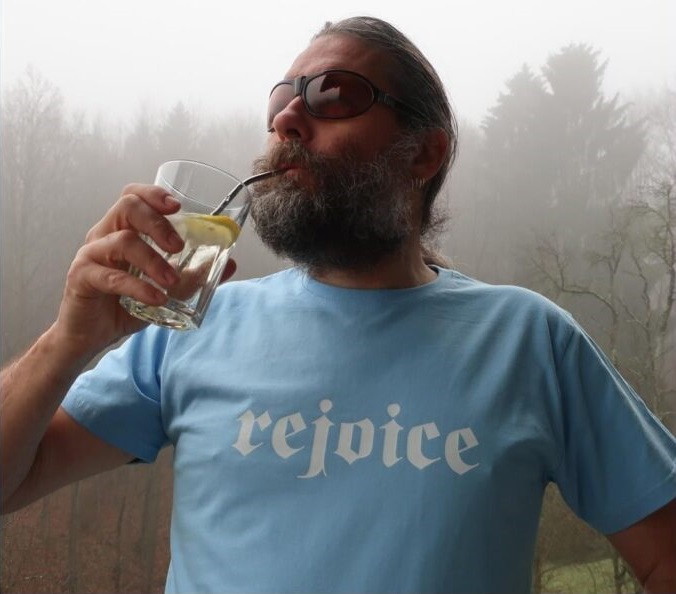

Albin Julius (born Albin Julius Martinek, 16 October 1967 – 4 May 2022) was an Austrian martial music and industrial artist; his primary musical project was called Der Blutharsch. His ancestors came to Austria from Bohemia, where they came from the city of Jihlava.

Julius founded the history-themed, folk-based ensemble, The Moon Lay Hidden Beneath a Cloud. His first release as Der Blutharsch was a self-titled picture disc, limited to 250 copies.

Julius released all Der Blutharsch music on his own record label, Wir Kapitulieren Niemals (WKN, which translates: We Never Surrender). Julius founded the HauRuck! music label, which releases albums by several Neofolk and industrial groups.
