= Boyd Rice =

American experimental musician

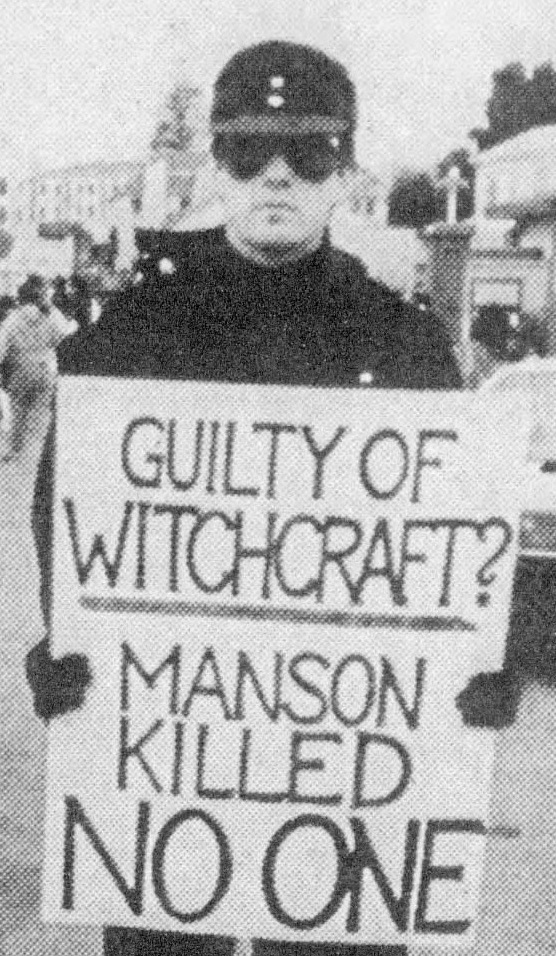
- Rice at a protest in support of Charles Manson in 1989

Background information
- Also known as: NON
- Born: Boyd Blake Rice; December 16, 1956 (age 69); Lemon Grove, California, U.S.
- Origin: Denver, Colorado, U.S.
- Genres: Experimental; noise; industrial; drone; neofolk
- Occupations: Musician, composer, author
- Instruments: Turntables; vocals
- Years active: 1975–present
- Label: Mute

Boyd Blake Rice (born December 16, 1956) is an American experimental sound/noise musician using the name of NON since the mid-1970s. He is an industrial musician, writer, and photographer. Rice's music and art have been influenced by fascist ideas and aesthetics, and has often been accused of fascist sympathies.

== Biography ==
Rice was born on December 16, 1956, in Lemon Grove, California. He became known through his involvement in V. Vale's RE/Search Publications. He is profiled in RE/Search #6/7: Industrial Culture Handbook and Pranks!

He first made the news for, at the age of 19, showing a skinned pig or goat's head to then-First Lady Betty Ford. He was arrested and interrogated by the US Secret Service, but was released.

== Music ==
Rice creates music under his own name, as well as under the moniker of NON and with contributors under various other project names.

Rice experimented with sound and the medium through which that sound is conveyed. On his second seven-inch, he had 2–4 extra holes punched into the record for "multi axial rotation".

=== NON ===
In 1978, he formed NON as a duo with second member Robert Turman. Rice has recorded several noise music albums, and collaborated with experimental music/dark folk artists like Current 93, Death in June and Rose McDowall. Most of his music has been released on the Mute Records label. Rice has also collaborated with Frank Tovey of Fad Gadget, Tony Wakeford of Sol Invictus and Michael Jenkins Moynihan of Blood Axis. His later albums have often been explicitly conceptual.

On Might! (1995), Rice layered portions of Ragnar Redbeard's Social Darwinist harangue, Might Is Right over sound beds of looped noise and manipulated frequencies.

== Other work ==
After dropping out of high school at the age of 17, Rice began an in-depth study of early 20th-century art movements, producing his own abstract black and white paintings and experimental photographs. Early on, he met European art historian and gallery owner Arturo Schwarz, with whom he began a long correspondence. Schwarz, a biographer of Duchamp and Man Ray, encouraged Rice to pursue his art, no matter what. Though he would later shift his focus to sound, he has never stopped creating visual art and has given a number of one man shows over the years.

In the mid-1970s Rice devoted a great deal of time to experimental photography, developing a process by which he could produce "photographs of things which don't exist". He had a one-man show of the photos in the early 1980s at Richard Peterson's Pink & Pearl Gallery in San Diego, which was documented in the local press.

In the mid-1980s Rice became close friends with Anton LaVey, founder and high priest of the Church of Satan, and was made a priest, then later a magister in the Council of Nine of the Church. The two shared many views and had each been inspired by Might Is Right. In 1987 Rice and Nikolas Schreck founded the Abraxas Foundation, an "occult-fascist" think tank that also counted Adam Parfrey and Michael J. Moynihan among its members. During an interview, Rice described the basic philosophy of his foundation as being "The strong rule the weak, and the clever rule the strong".

Rice was for many years an advocate of Charles Manson, personally communicating with him in prison. This ended when Rice was arrested for bringing a bullet with him into the prison, which ended their relationship; despite this, in February 1989 Rice appeared rallying for Manson's release during Manson's parole hearing, wearing a sign that read "Guilty of Witchcraft? Manson Killed No One". Rice has documented the writings of Manson in his role as contributing editor of the 1988 book The Manson File.

== Writing ==
=== Essays ===
In the mid-1980s, Rice contributed essays to a handful of independently published book collections such as Incredibly Strange Films, Apocalypse Culture, The Manson File, and others. In the 1990s Rice wrote polemics for several underground 'zines, such as Debbie and Jim Goad's ANSWER Me!, Lisa Crystal Carver's Rollerderby and various other small publications. In the late 1990s and early 2000s Rice was a staff member at Modern Drunkard Magazine, and contributed numerous texts to the publication. He also penned essays for the books Taboo: The Art of Tiki and Apocalypse Culture II.

In the early 2000s, Rice began researching esoteric topics related to the pseudohistorical concept of the so-called "grail bloodline" and the Priory of Sion hoax (which he apparently was credulous of) and became a regular contributor to Tracy R. Twyman's "neo-Arcadian" 'zine, Dagobert's Revenge. He also published an essay on these themes for Richard Metzler's 2003 occult Disinfo collection, Book of Lies.

=== Books ===
Most of Rice's writings from the mid-1980s to the early 2000s were republished in Standing in Two Circles: The Collected Works of Boyd Rice, which was issued by the British imprint Creation Books in 2008, with a French translation from the Parisian publisher Camion Noir in 2009. Standing in Two Circles received mixed but generally critical reviews, and was never republished.

A collection of Rice's writings on "the grail bloodline" and related revisionist history topics was first published in Portuguese as Porto do Graal by Terra Fria, in 2005. The book was later republished in English as The Vessel of God: The Selected Grail Writings of Boyd Rice, by the Peruvian imprint Manus Sinistra, in 2024.

In 2009, the small American publisher Heartworm Press (run by Wesley Eisold of Cold Cave) released No, a collection of Rice's short essays. In 2011 Heartworm also published Twilight Man, a memoir of Rice's time spent working as an alarm agent in San Francisco in the 1980s.

In 2019, Rice self-published The Last Testament of Anton Szandor LaVey, an account of his memories of the late Church of Satan founder Anton LaVey.

== Views ==
Since the 1980s Rice's music and art have been influenced by fascist ideas and aesthetics. The packaging for NON's 1986 album Blood & Flame, for instance, included a Wolfsangel and a quote from Alfred Rosenberg. He has often been accused of fascist sympathies as a result. He also cultivated connections with neo-Nazis such as James Mason (who he began corresponding with in 1986), Tom Metzger (whose TV show he appeared on in 1986) and American Front leader Bob Heick. He has described himself as an "aesthetic fascist". In 1997, he stated in an interview that:

I feel that I’m a fascist, but 'Nazi' is a real specific term... I'm a fascist in the sense of the modern bastardized meaning of the word. I’m completely against democratic values and liberalism. I think that they have very little to do with life on Earth. I think they're an ideological abstraction.

In his first letter to Mason, dated April 1986, Rice states "I am completely of the Manson-Hitler thought & do whatever I can to further it." This was only made public in the 2020s upon being reported on by Spencer Sunshine, having been read from a collection of Mason's paper correspondence located in an archive at the University of Kansas. In 2025 Sunshine reported that in a later letter to Mason, Rice states that he was reading American Nazi Party leader George Lincoln Rockwell's book White Power and calls it "awesome", and that this letter was decorated with a swastika at the top of the page.

During one broadcast of Metzger's show, Rice agreed with the host's assertions that industrial music was "a new propaganda art form for white Aryans", and when asked about "racial separatism and tribalism," Rice said "it seems like the only intelligent way to go."

Rice introduced Mason to Adam Parfrey and Michael J. Moynihan, who would bring Mason's book Siege to a larger audience. In 1989, Rice and Heick were photographed for Sassy wearing American Front uniforms and brandishing knives. He has also expressed support for elements of fascism in his writings, interviews, and public appearances.

Rice began to face a backlash for these associations in the late 1980s when Jello Biafra, Peter Christopherson, Frank Tovey, and V. Vale cut their ties with him. In the 1990s he began to disassociate himself from the far right and began to use fascist iconography with more irony. This led to debates in the late 1990s and early 2000s regarding whether or not Rice's use of taboo symbolism and his controversial statements made in interviews were sincere. In 2025, Spencer Sunshine, showed that Rice's "involvement [with actual white supremacists] was much deeper than anyone had previously guessed at, and [Sunshine's] new evidence more damning than that previously uncovered even by the most careful of researchers."

Rice has denied that he is a neo-Nazi. In one 2012 interview he praised Arthur de Gobineau while adding, "I don’t think that to believe in the principle of natural inequality that necessarily equates to: you hate black people or you hate Jews or something." In another 2019 interview he described himself as "utterly apolitical." A 2018 art show was cancelled because of protests over Rice's fascist associations, as were some shows on Rice's 2013 tour with Cold Cave.

== Personal life ==
Rice dated Lisa Crystal Carver, with whom he has a son.

Rice was arrested in 1995 for domestic violence, though never charged. Carver writes in her memoir, Drugs Are Nice, that he physically abused her.

== Discography ==
Year	Title	Under
1976	The Black Album	Boyd Rice
1977	Mode of Infection/Knife Ladder – 7"	NON
1978	Pagan Muzak – 7" with multiple locked grooves	NON
1982	Rise – 12"	NON
1982 (rec. 1977–82)	Physical Evidence	NON
1983	Sickness of Snakes / Nightmare Culture	Boyd Rice & COIL / Boyd Rice & Current 93
1984 (rec. 1981)	Easy Listening for the Hard of Hearing	Boyd Rice and Frank Tovey
1985	Sick Tour – Live in Holland	NON
1987 (rec. 1983)	Blood and Flame	NON
1990	Music, Martinis and Misanthropy	Boyd Rice and Friends
1991	Easy Listening for Iron Youth – The Best of NON	NON
1992	In the Shadow of the Sword	NON
1993	I'm Just Like You	The Tards (8" single by Boyd Rice & Adam Parfrey)
1993	Ragnarok Rune	Boyd Rice
1993	Seasons in the Sun	Spell
1994	The Monopoly Queen – 7"	The Monopoly Queen (w/ Mary Ellen Carver & Combustible Edison)
1995	Might!	NON
1995	Hatesville	The Boyd Rice Experience with Adam Parfrey
1996	Heaven Sent	Scorpion Wind (w/ Douglas P. & John Murphy)
1996	Ralph Gean: A Star Unborn	Boyd Rice Presents
1996	Death's Gladsome Wedding: Hymns and Marches from Transylvania's Notorious Legionari Movement	Boyd Rice Presents
1997	God & Beast	NON
1999	Receive the Flame	NON
1999	Pagan Muzak – 7" with multiple locked grooves Rerelease	NON
2000	The Way I Feel	Boyd Rice
2000	Solitude – 7" with locked grooves on B-side	NON
2001	Wolf Pact	Boyd Rice and Fiends
2002	Children of the Black Sun	NON
2002	The Registered Three	Boyd Rice & Friends (C.D. Single)
2002	Music for Pussycats: Girl Groups	Boyd Rice Presents
2004	Baptism By Fire (Live)	Boyd Rice and Fiends
2004	Terra Incognita: Ambient Works 1975 to Present	Boyd Rice/NON
2004	Alarm Agents	Death in June & Boyd Rice
2005	The Very Best of Little Fyodor's Greatest Hits!	Boyd Rice Presents
2008	Boyd Rice and Z'EV	Boyd Rice and Z'EV
2008	Going Steady With Peggy Moffitt	Giddle & Boyd
2012	Back to Mono	NON
2020	Blast of Silence	NON

== Bibliography ==
- Rice, Boyd (2008). Standing in Two Circles: The Collected Works of Boyd Rice. London, United Kingdom: Creation Books. ISBN 978-1840681185.
- Rice, Boyd (2009). No. Los Angeles, United States: Heartworm Press. ISBN 978-1976392771.
- Rice, Boyd (2011). Twilight Man. Los Angeles, United States: Heartworm Press. ISBN 978-6124991653.
- Rice, Boyd (2019). The Last Testament of Anton Szandor LaVey. Denver, United States: Hierarchy Books. ISBN 978-1081044183.
- Rice, Boyd (2024). The Vessel of God: The Selected Grail Writings of Boyd Rice. Lima, Peru: Manus Sinistra. ISBN 978-6124964022.

== Filmography ==
=== Film ===
- Pranks! TV! (1986, VHS) (directed by V. Vale), RE/Search Publications
- Tyranny of the Beat (1991), Mute Records
- Speak of the Devil (1995, VHS) (about Anton LaVey, directed by Nick Bougas), Wavelength Video
- Boyd Rice Documentary, Part One (1994), Joel Haertling
- Boyd Rice Documentary, Part Two (1998), Joel Haertling
- Pearls Before Swine (1999) (directed by Richard Wolstencroft)
- Nixing the Twist (2000, DVD) (directed by Frank Kelly Rich), High Crime Films
- The Many Moods of Boyd Rice (2002, VHS), Predatory Instinct Productions
- Church of Satan Interview Archive (2003, DVD), Purging Talon
- Baptism by Fire (2004, DVD) (live performance in Bologna, Italy), NERO2
- Frank Tovey by Fad Gadget (2006) (documentary), Mute Records
- Iconoclast (2011) (directed by Larry Wessel), iconoclastmovie.com
- Modern Drunkard (directed by Frank Kelly Rich)
- In Satan's Name (BBC documentary by director Antony Thomas)
- In Satan's Name (Bob Larson's 31-episode television series), Trinity Broadcasting Network
- Resort Beyond the Last Resort (music video directed by Kansas Bowling), Collapsing Scenery

=== Performance ===
- Live in Osaka (DVD) (features a concert performance from Osaka, Japan in 1989, with Michael Moynihan, Tony Wakeford, Douglas P. and Rose McDowall; also includes Rice's films Invocation (One) and Black Sun)
