= List of industrial music genres =

Industrial music is a form of experimental music which emerged in the 1970s. During the 1980s, the genre splintered into a range of offshoots collectively labelled post-industrial music. These styles drew influence from the first wave of industrial, while incorporating elements from more accessible genres such as rock, pop, folk, heavy metal, EDM and hip hop.

This list details some of these offshoots, including industrial genres which have spread worldwide in North America, Europe, and Japan.

== Industrial music ==
Industrial music comprises many styles of experimental music, including many forms of electronic music. The term was originally coined in 1976 by Monte Cazazza and Throbbing Gristle, with the founding of Industrial Records. The first industrial artists experimented with noise and controversial topics. Their production was not limited to music, but included mail art, performance art, installation pieces and other art forms. Other early industrial musicians include NON and Cabaret Voltaire. By the late 1970s, additional artists emerged such as Clock DVA, Nocturnal Emissions, Einstürzende Neubauten, SPK, Nurse with Wound, and Z'EV, alongside Whitehouse who coined the subgenre "power electronics".

== Post-Industrial developments ==
=== Post-Industrial ===
Post-Industrial
- Stylistic origins: Industrial; post-punk; new wave; pop; metal; new age; hip hop; ambient music; folk music; EDM; funk; jazz; disco; reggae; rock
- Cultural origins: 1980s; United Kingdom and United States
- Derivative forms: Neofolk; futurepop; Neue Deutsche Härte; new beat; hard beat; witch house; deconstructed club

Subgenres
- Dark ambient; power noise; electro-industrial; EBM; martial industrial; dark electro; aggrotech; cyber metal; isolationism; techstep; neurofunk

Fusion genres
- Industrial rock; industrial hip hop; industrial metal; industrial pop; industrial dance; industrial techno

Other topics
- Japanoise

Post-Industrial is a subgenre of industrial music that originally emerged in the early 1980s, as a catch-all for several industrial music inspired styles, subgenres and fusions that followed the disbanding of Throbbing Gristle. While the original industrial sound was rooted in avant-garde and experimental music, post-industrial offered more accessible, commercial and diverse offshoots, with the incorporation of traditional pop songwriting, and influences from a variety of genres, which later led to the mainstreaming of several popular acts during the 1990s. Artists incorporated influences from new wave, rock, pop, heavy metal, hip hop, jazz, funk, disco, reggae, ambient music, folk music, post-punk, EDM, and new age music.

Chicago record label Wax Trax! Records was prominent in the widespread attention industrial music later received. The label was started by Jim Nash and Dannie Flesher, and became a central hub for the emerging industrial rock genre during the late 1980s to early 1990s. Wax Trax! released albums by artists such as Front 242, Front Line Assembly, KMFDM, and Sister Machine Gun. Another prominent label was Canada's Nettwerk which signed Skinny Puppy. Notable post-industrial styles included dark ambient, power noise, Japanoise, industrial rock, neofolk, electro-industrial, EBM, industrial hip hop, industrial metal, industrial pop, martial industrial, and futurepop.

=== Dark ambient ===
Dark ambient is a subgenre of post-industrial and ambient music, pioneered by artists such as Coil, Lilith, Nurse with Wound, Lustmord, and Zoviet France. These artists make use of non-musical material and noise, but less abrasively than other post-industrial musicians, bordering more on ambient music. The last material that Throbbing Gristle recorded in the studio, In the Shadow of the Sun and Journey Through a Body, was ambient, and pointed in the direction that TG's offshoots (notably Coil, Chris & Cosey) would take. Other artists include Long Distance Poison, Hafler Trio, MRT, Kim Cascone, Controlled Bleeding, Nine Inch Nails (on their album Ghosts I–IV), early Techno Animal, prominent game music composer Akira Yamaoka, Robin Rimbaud, Final and Deutsch Nepal. Subsequent subgenres and fusions include dungeon synth, black ambient, ritual ambient, death ambient, drone ambient, noise ambient, industrial ambient and isolationist ambient.

=== EBM ===
Electronic body music, or EBM, combines elements of European industrial, German electronic music such as that of Klaus Schulze, and music of the Neue Deutsche Welle electropunk scene. It first came to prominence in Belgium. The original term was coined by Ralf Hütter of Kraftwerk in 1978 to describe the more physical sound of their album The Man-Machine. Belgian group Front 242 used the term in its current sense in 1984 to describe their album No Comment, released the same year. It denotes a certain type of danceable electronic music, a mixture of electropunk and industrial music. Other artists include Armageddon Dildos, Die Krupps, à;GRUMH..., A Split-Second, And One, Bigod 20, The Neon Judgement, and Attrition.

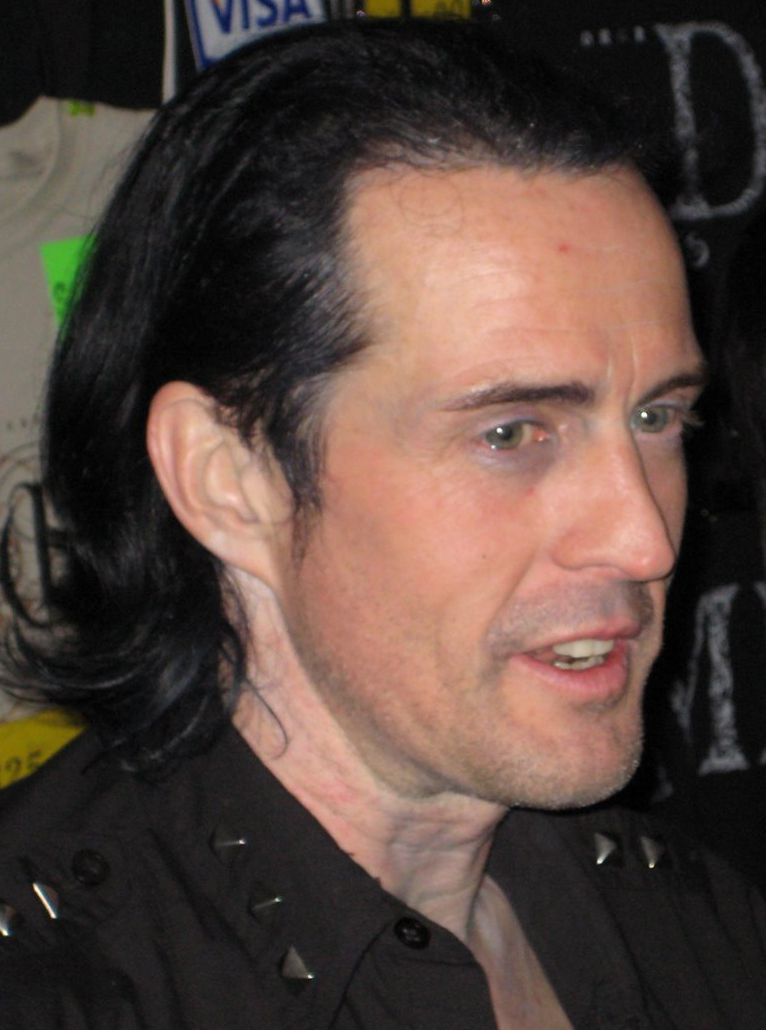
Nivek Ogre of Skinny Puppy, an electro-industrial group

=== Electro-industrial ===
Electro-Industrial draws on Electronic Body Music (EBM), and developed in the mid-1980s. While EBM has a minimal structure and clean production, electro-industrial has a deep, complex and layered sound. The style was pioneered by Skinny Puppy, Front Line Assembly, and Wumpscut. In the mid-'90s, the style spawned the dark electro and aggrotech offshoots. Other artists include Haujobb, Lab Report, and Leæther Strip.

=== Industrial hip hop ===
Industrial hip hop fuses the themes and aesthetics of industrial with hip hop music. Its origins are in the work of Mark Stewart and Adrian Sherwood. In 1985, Stewart, former Pop Group singer, released As the Veneer of Democracy Starts to Fade, applying the cut-up style of industrial music with the house band of Sugar Hill Records (Doug Wimbish, Keith Leblanc, and Skip McDonald). Sherwood was a major figure in British dub music, as well as working with industrial groups such as Cabaret Voltaire, Einstürzende Neubauten, Ministry, KMFDM, and Nine Inch Nails. Tackhead, a collaboration between Sherwood and the Sugar Hill band, picked up where Stewart left off. The Disposable Heroes of Hiphoprisy, from San Francisco, and Meat Beat Manifesto, from the UK, are also early representatives of the style. The later work of Broadrick's Godflesh, as well as his collaborations with Kevin Martin, Ice, and Techno Animal, are examples of industrial hip hop. Saul Williams, a slam poet, also performs in the style. Other notable contributors include clipping., B L A C K I E, Death Grips, JPEGMafia, and Dälek.

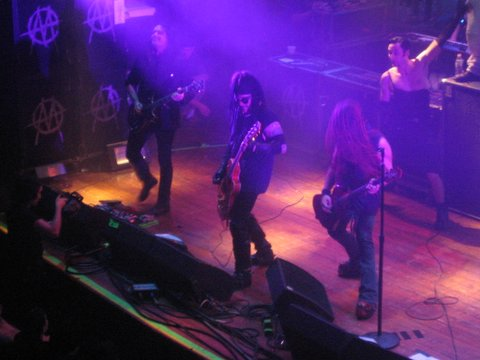
Al Jourgensen with Revolting Cocks, an industrial rock group

=== Industrial rock and industrial metal ===
Industrial rock artists generally employ the basic rock instrumentation of electric guitars, drums and bass and pair it with white noise blasts, electronic music gear (synthesizers, sequencers, samplers and drum machines). Guitars are commonly heavily distorted or otherwise effected. Bass guitars and drums may be played live, or be replaced by electronic musical instruments or computers. The early fusions of industrial music and rock were practiced by a handful of post-punk groups, including Chrome, Killing Joke, Swans, Big Black, and Foetus. Nine Inch Nails popularized industrial rock in the US with the release of Pretty Hate Machine and The Downward Spiral. Industrial metal evolved from the scene, and is practiced by groups such as Ministry, Godflesh, and Fear Factory.

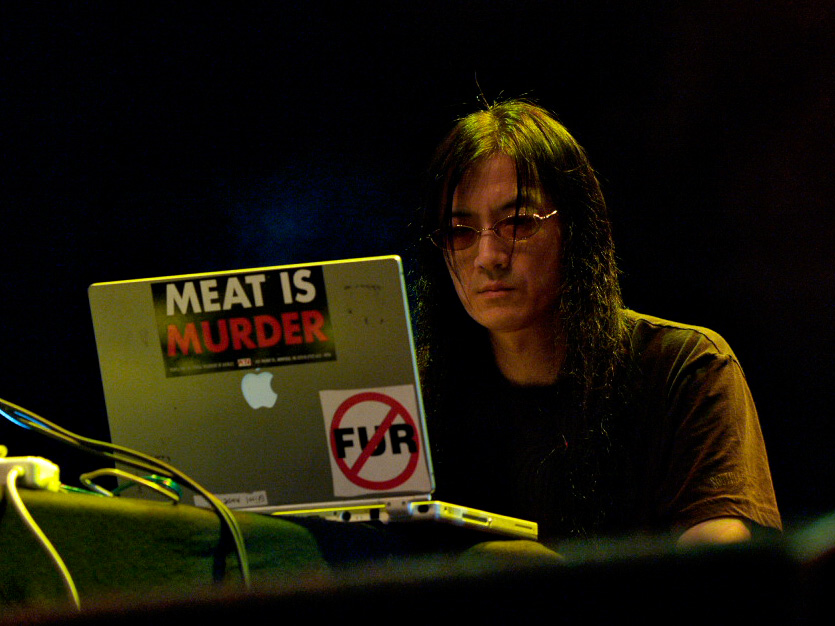
Merzbow, prominent Japanoise musician, in 2007

=== Japanoise ===
Japanoise (a blend of the words "Japanese" and "noise") is the noise music scene of Japan. Popular and active in the 1980s and 1990s but continuing into the early 21st century, the Japanoise scene is defined by its sense of musical freedom: Groups range from the punk demolition of Hanatarash and its subsequent psychedelic Boredoms evolutions, to the tabletop electronics of Incapacitants and Merzbow. The scene was initially inspired by power electronics and sometimes deals with BDSM themes. Nonetheless, Japanoise is often less serious than other post-industrial styles, and some musicians, such as Aube, are also inspired by psychedelia or space rock.

=== Neofolk ===
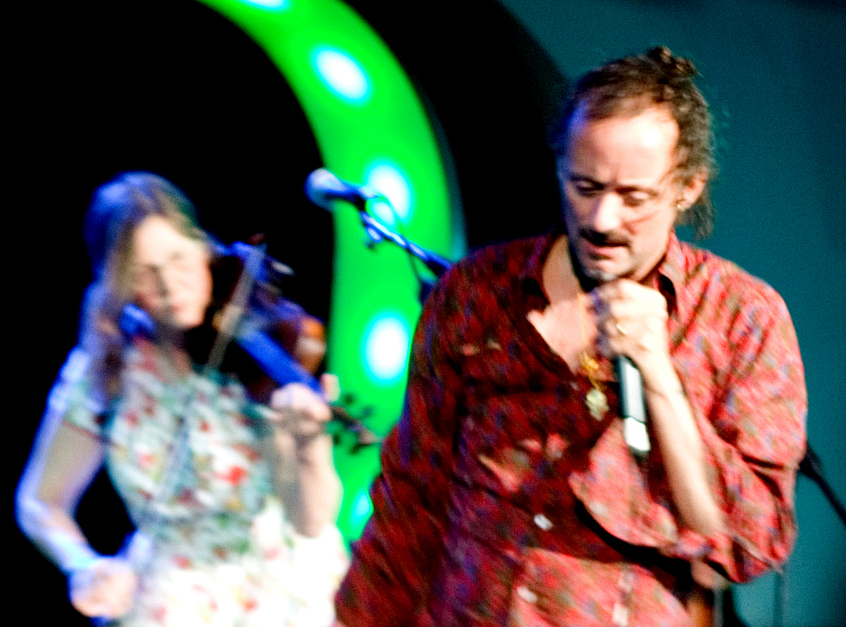
The apocalyptic folk group Current 93 in 2007

Neofolk is the music of artists like Douglas Pearce of Death In June, Tony Wakeford of Sol Invictus, and David Tibet of Current 93, who had collaborated with one another. These musicians comprised a post-industrial music circle who incorporated folk music based on traditional European elements. Neofolk can be solely acoustic folk music or a blend of acoustic folk instrumentation with accompanying sounds, such as pianos, strings or elements of industrial music and experimental music. The genre encompasses an assortment of themes including traditional music, heathenry, romanticism and occultism. Neofolk musicians often have ties to other genres such as martial industrial. Apocalyptic folk predates neofolk and was used by David Tibet for the music of his band Current 93 during the late 1980s. Initially, Tibet did not intend to imply connection with the folk music genre; rather, that Current 93's music was made by "apocalyptic folk, or guys."

=== Power electronics ===
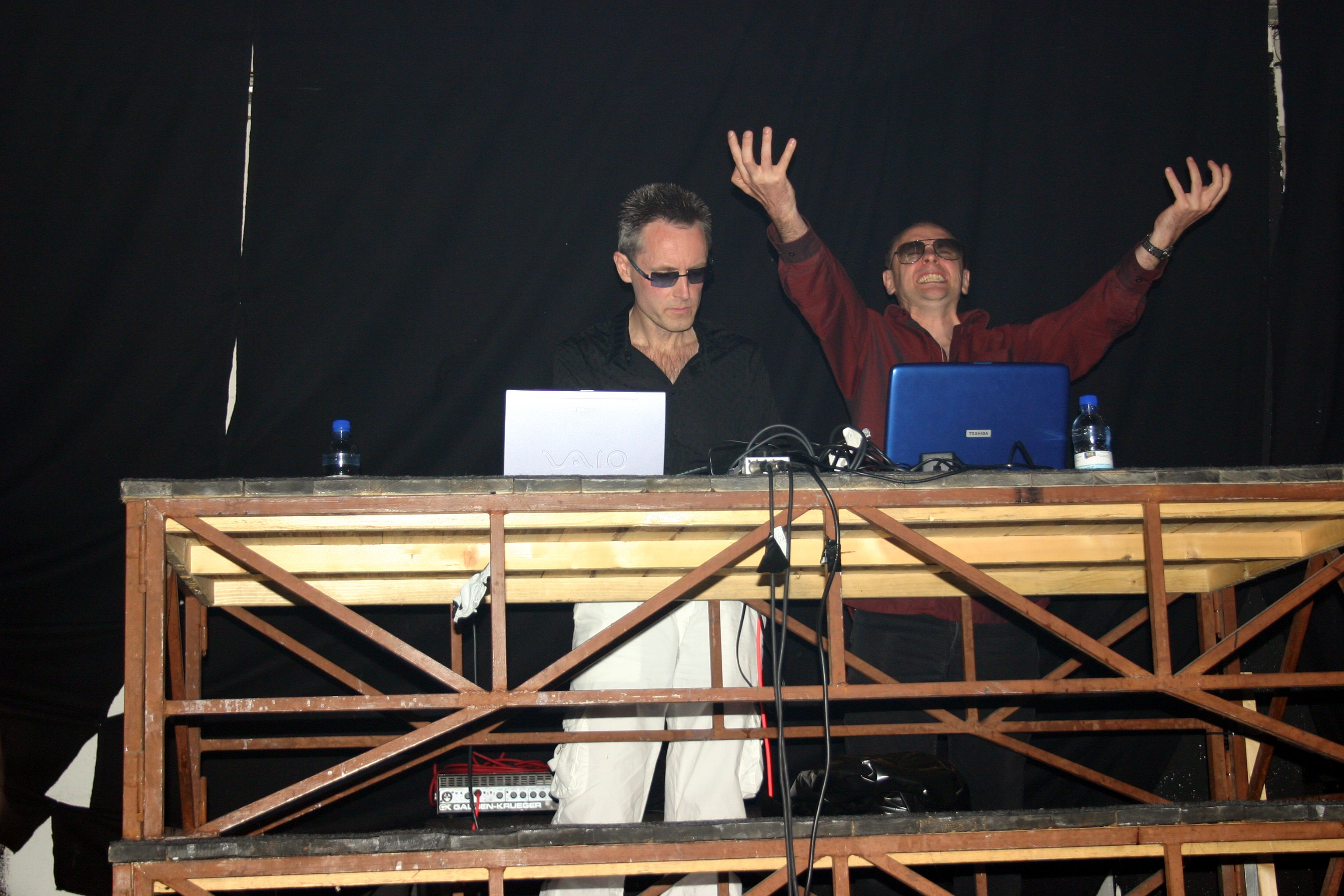
Whitehouse, the founders of power electronics

Power electronics was originally coined by William Bennett for the noise music of his own project Whitehouse. It consists of static, screeching waves of feedback, analogue synthesizers making sub-bass pulses or high frequency squealing sounds, and screamed, distorted, often hateful and offensive lyrics. Deeply atonal, there are no conventional melodies or rhythms. Members of Whitehouse who began other projects, such as Sutcliffe Jügend, also practice power electronics. Death industrial is a similar style associated with groups such as The Grey Wolves, but the term first referred to artists such as Brighter Death Now. The Swedish label Cold Meat Industry issued the releases in this subgenre.

=== Power noise ===
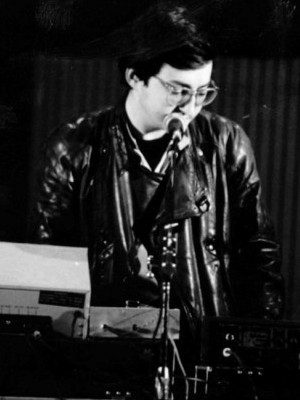
Esplendor Geometrico live in Rome 1986

Power noise (also known as rhythmic noise) is a subgenre of power electronics characterised by the merging of noise music with various forms of electronic dance music. Originally pioneered by Spanish group Esplendor Geométrico, and later Dive. The term "power noise" was coined by Raoul Roucka of Noisex in 1997, with the track "United (Power Noise Movement)". Typically, power noise is based upon a distorted kick drum from a drum machine such as a Roland TR-909, uses militaristic 4/4 beats, and is usually instrumental. Sometimes a melodic component is added, but this is almost always secondary to the rhythm. Power noise tracks are typically structured and danceable, but are occasionally abstract. This genre is showcased at the annual Maschinenfest festival in Krefeld, Germany, as well as at Infest in Bradford, England. Other artists include Imminent Starvation, Axiome, Converter, and Terrorfakt. The German labels Ant-Zen and Hands Productions specialize in the style. Technoid grew out of the scene, taking inspiration from IDM, experimental techno and noise music. German label Hymen Records is responsible for the term and the style. Artists include Gridlock, Black Lung, Revolution State, and Xingu Hill.

=== Dark electro ===
Dark electro is a subgenre of electro-industrial, developed in the early 1990s in central Europe. The term describes groups such as yelworC and Placebo Effect, and was first used in December 1992 with the album announcement of Brainstorming, yelworC's debut. The style was inspired by the music of The Klinik and Skinny Puppy. Compositions included gothic horror soundscapes, occult themes, and grunts or distorted vocals. yelworC were a music group from Munich, formed in 1988. They laid the foundations of the dark electro movement in the early 1990s, and were the first artist on the German label Celtic Circle Productions. In subsequent years, dark electro was displaced by techno-influenced styles such as aggrotech and futurepop. Other groups to practice the style included amGod, Trial, early Evil's Toy, Mortal Constraint, Arcana Obscura, Splatter Squall, Seven Trees, Tri-State, and Ice Ages.

=== Aggrotech ===
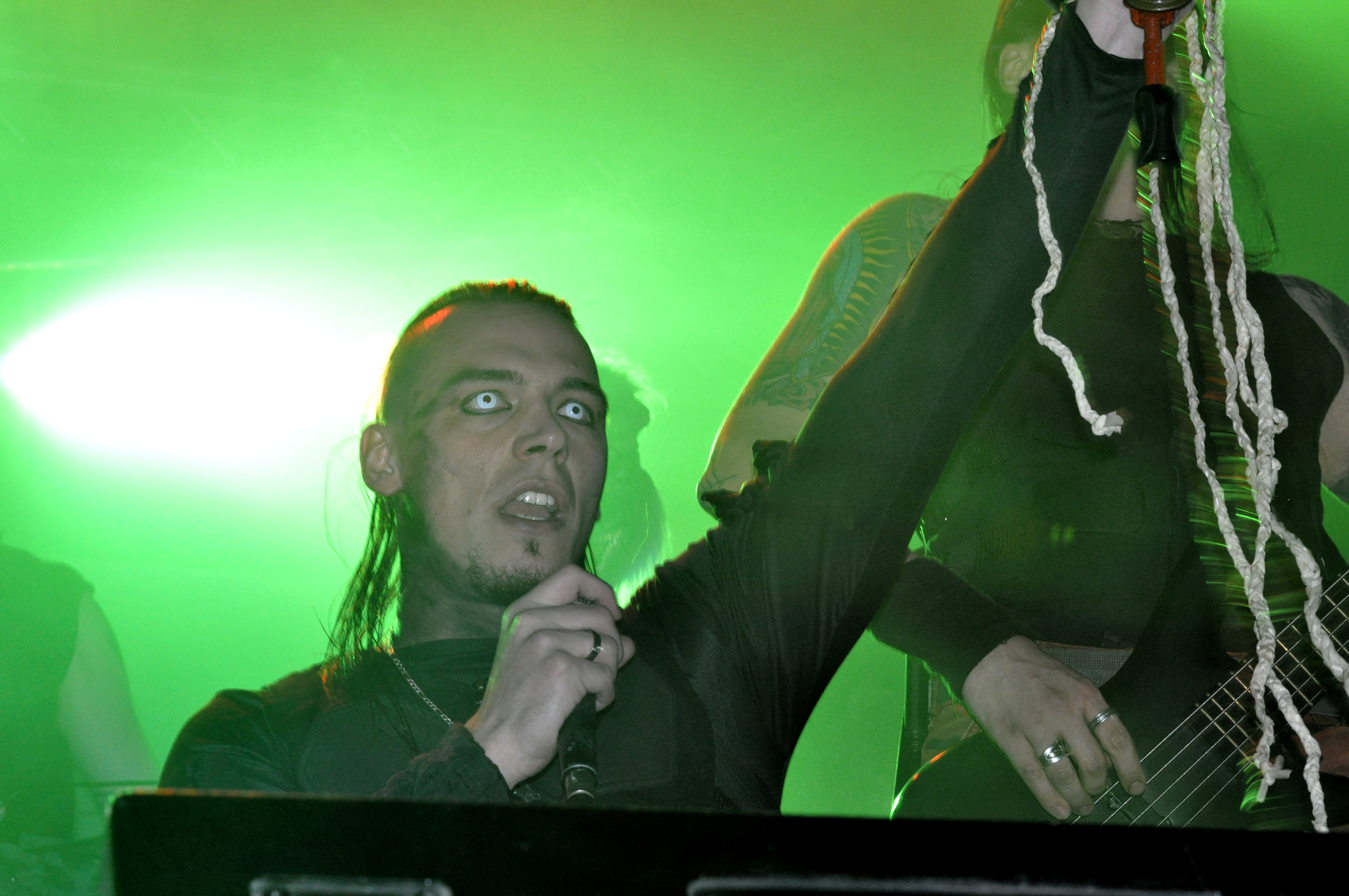
German aggrotech band Centhron at e-tropolis 2013, Berlin

Aggrotech (also known as hellektro) is a derivative form of dark-electro with a strong influence from industrial hardcore (straight techno bassdrum from Roland TR-909 and oscillator sounds, especially Supersaw leads from Roland JP-8000) that first surfaced in the mid- to late-1990s.

Aggrotech typically employs aggressive beats, prominent lead synth lines, and lyrics of a dark nature. Often, vocals are distorted and pitch-shifted to sound harsh and synthetic; static and glitching effects are also added. Aggrotech musicians include Agonoize, Amduscia, Bestias De Asalto, Combichrist, Dawn of Ashes, Detroit Diesel, Feindflug, God Module, Grendel, Hocico, iVardensphere, Nachtmahr, Panic Lift, Psyclon Nine, Reaper, Suicide Commando, The Retrosic, Ritual Aesthetic, Unter Null, Virtual Embrace, and X-Fusion, among many.

=== Futurepop ===
Futurepop is an electronic music genre originally emerging in the late 1990s, characterized as a blend of synth-pop, EBM and dance beats, based on trance and techno. The genre is associated with the cybergoth subculture.

=== Techstep ===
Techstep is a dark subgenre of drum and bass that was created in the mid-1990s.

=== Neurofunk ===
Neurofunk (also known informally as neuro) is a dark subgenre of drum and bass which emerged between 1997 and 1998 in London, England as a progression of techstep.

=== Witch house ===
Witch house is a debated term referring to a fusion genre of electronic music that features a prominent hip-hop influence, specifically the 1990s Houston chopped and screwed sound pioneered by DJ Screw. Witch house consists of applying techniques rooted in Swishahouse hip-hop – drastically slowed tempos with skipping, stop-timed beats – with signifiers of noise, drone, or shoegaze, the genre recontextualizes its forebears into a sinister, unprecedented, yet aesthetically referential atmosphere. Witch house is also influenced by hazy 1980s goth bands, including Cocteau Twins, The Cure and Dead Can Dance, as well as being heavily influenced by certain early industrial bands. The use of hip-hop drum machines, noise atmospherics, creepy samples, synthpop-influenced lead melodies, and heavily altered or distorted vocals is also common.

== Sales ==
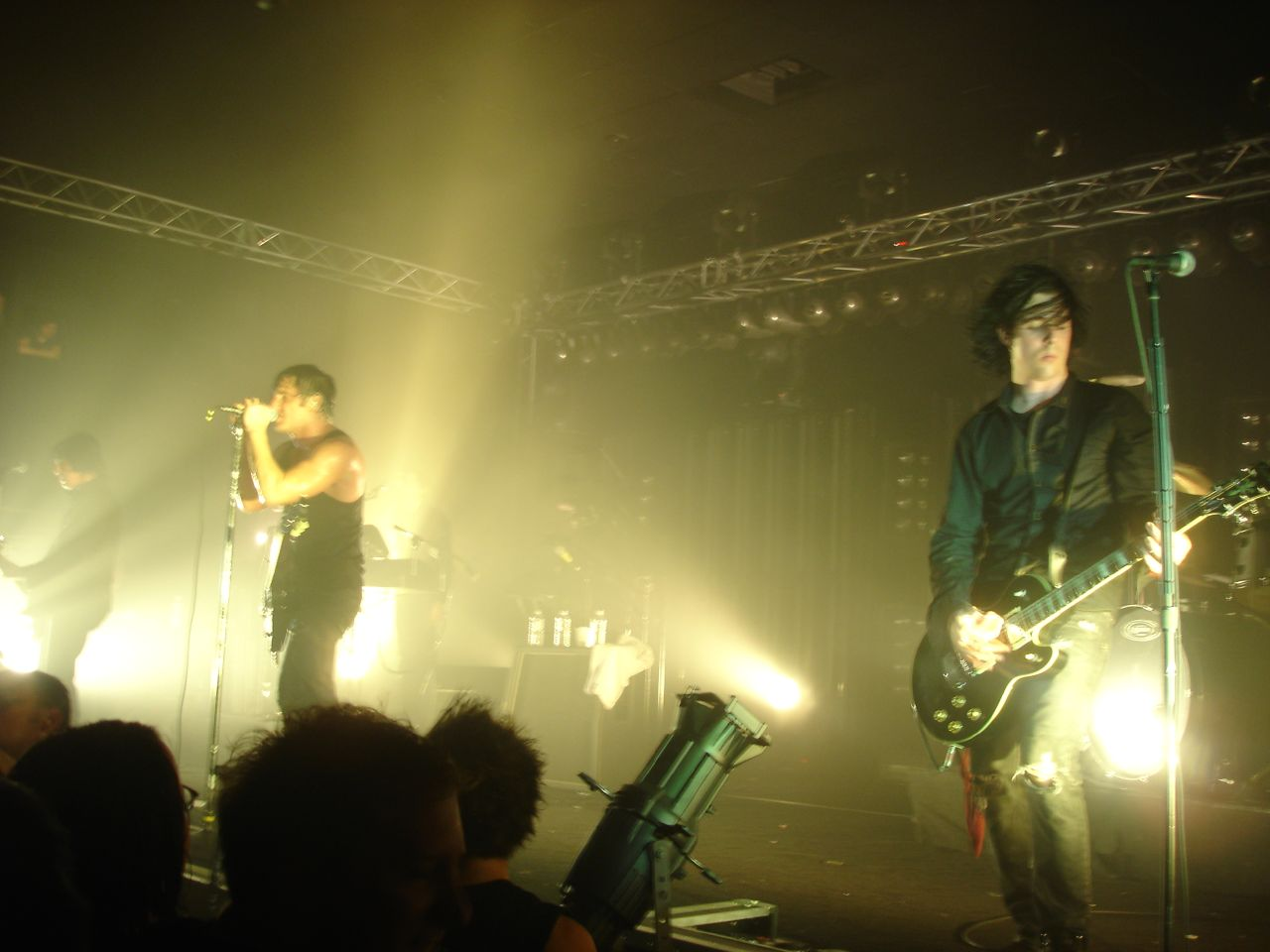
Nine Inch Nails live on tour in 2005

The best-selling offshoots of industrial music are industrial rock and metal; Ministry and Nine Inch Nails both recorded platinum-selling albums. Their success led to an increase in commercial success for some other post-industrial musicians; the Nine Inch Nails remix album Further Down the Spiral, for example, which included contributions from Foetus and Coil, was certified gold in 1996.
