= Deutsch Nepal =

Swedish industrial/dark ambient project

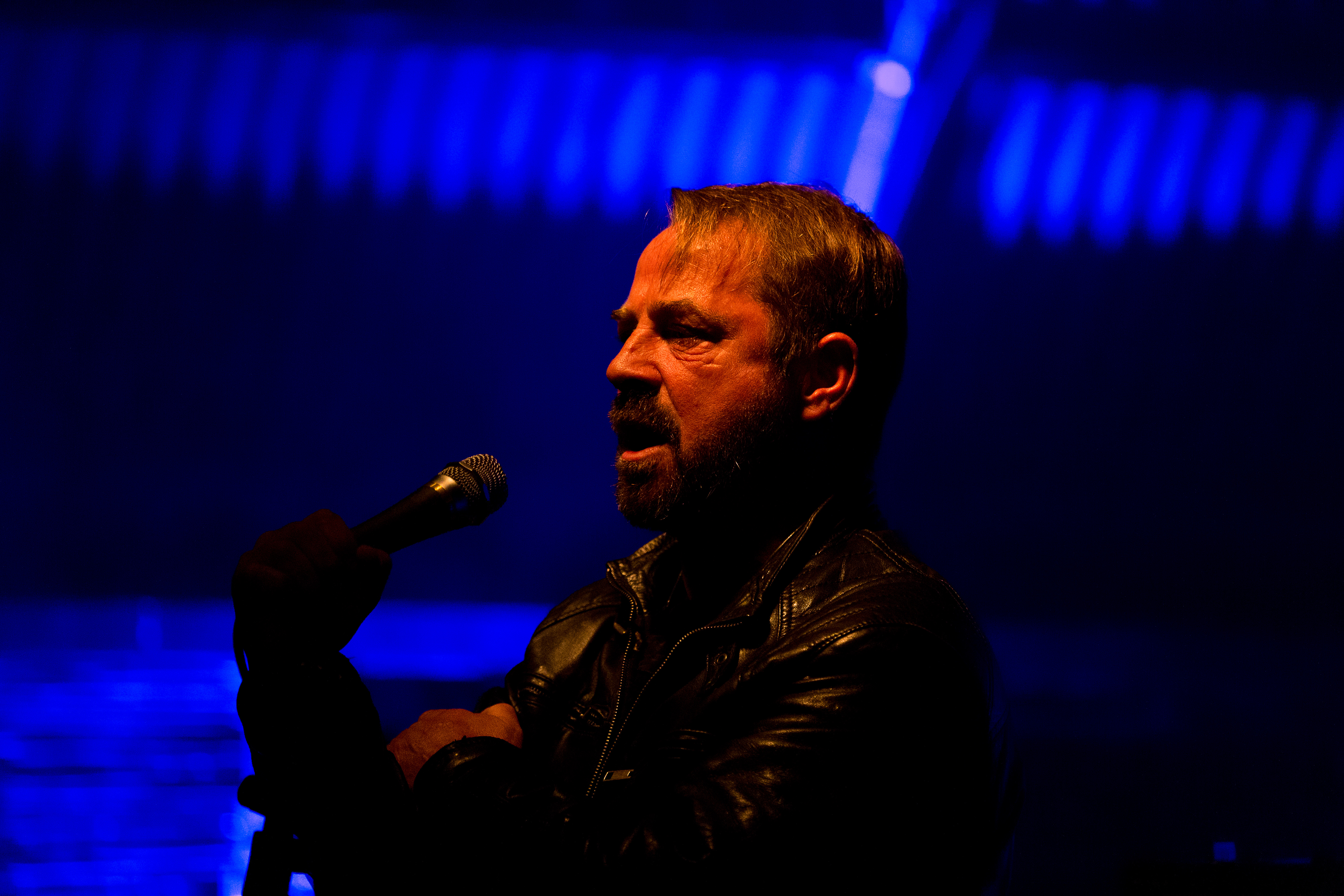

Background information
- Origin: Gothenburg, Sweden
- Genres: Industrial, dark ambient
- Years active: 1991–present
- Labels: Cold Meat Industry; Sound Source; Staalplaat; Mort Aux Vaches; Old Europa Cafe; Ant-Zen
- Members: Peter Andersson
- Website: https://deutschnepal.bandcamp.com

Deutsch Nepal is an industrial and dark ambient project created in 1991 by Swedish musician Peter Andersson.

== History ==
Under the name Deutsch Nepal, Andersson has issued eight studio albums, a couple of singles, the originally tape-only Silent Trilogy (on the Italian label, Old Europa Cafe), which was eventually re-issued as a CD box-set and The Very Top Of Lina Baby Doll 12-inch. He also contributed to various compilations and released split CDs with In Slaughter Natives, The Moon Lay Hidden Beneath a Cloud, Der Blutharsch, Reutoff and a split 7-inch with P·A·L. In 2008 he released the Dystopian Partycollection CD which contained material previously only available on compilations and vinyl-only EPs.

The name "Deutsch Nepal" is derived from the track of the same name released in 1972 by German krautrock band Amon Düül II.

Lina, along with Brighter Death Now's Roger Karmanik co-founded the label Cold Meat Industry in 1987.

== Side projects ==
Andersson was also involved in some side projects over the years:

- Frozen Faces
- Janitor - A joint project with BJNilsen.
- Bocksholm - His project with Peter Andersson of Raison d'être.

== Discography ==
Studio albums:

- Deflagration of Hell (1991)
- Benevolence (Flogging Satan Alive) (1993)
- Tolerance (How the Servant Utilized His Masters) (1994)
- Only Silence Among The Filthy (1994)
- The Silent Earth (1995)
- The Very Top Of Lina Baby Doll (1996)
- ¡Comprendido!... Time Stop! ...And World Ending (1996)
- Erosion (1999)
- Behind A Wall Of Silence (2000)
- A Silent Siege (2002)
- Erotikon (2006)
- Amygdala (2011)
- Alcohology (2015)
- Klinik der reinen Vernunft (Deutsch Nepal /Mama Baer) (2017)
- Klinik der praktischen Vernunft (Deutsch Nepal & Mama Baer / TOL & KHj+F.) (2017)
- Eating The Dust (Reutoff Feat. Deutsch Nepal) (2018)

Live:

- Live In Saint-Petersburg 261206 (2011)
- Pzykadelischer Todeswunsch Auf Dem Machinenfest 2k9 - Deutsch Nepal Live In Essen (2014)

Singles & EPs:

- A Night In Fear (Deutsch Nepal & The Moon Lay Hidden Beneath A Cloud) (1996)
- Deutsch NeP•A•L (Deutsch Nepal / P·A·L) (1996)
- Environment (1997)
- Apöcalyptic Climäx 2 (Der Blutharsch & Deutsch Nepal) (1999)
- The City Of Stone (2003)
- The Bird Of Steel (2004)
- Rapist Park Junktion (2011)

Collaborative:

- Mort Aux Vaches (In Slaughter Natives / Deutsch Nepal) (1994)
- Kreuzung Vier (Reutoff vs Deutsch Nepal) (2009)

Compilations:

- Deutsch Nepals Dystopian Partycollection (2008)
- The Silent Container (2009)

== See also ==
- List of dark ambient artists
- List of ambient music artists
