= Triarii (band) =

German martial industrial band

- Origin: Germany
- Genres: Example: Martial industrial; Neoclassic; Neofolk
- Years active: 2004–present
- Labels: Eternal Soul Records, Cold Meat Industry
- Members: Christian Erdmann

Triarii is a one-man music project from the genre of martial industrial, whose name derives from the elite soldiers of the Roman battle order, the Triarians. Christian Erdmann is responsible for the music. The recordings of Triarii are published by the label Eternal Soul Records. Characteristic for the style of the project is the sublime sound of the music and the use of samples. Erdmann himself contributes only sporadic (heavily distorted) vocals; according to his own statement, his goal is to "at some point dissolve into complete megalomania".

== History ==
After a long period of preliminary musical work, Christian Erdmann's overall artistic concept Triarii was well received by the Berlin music label Eternal Soul in 2004. There, the first single "Triumph" was soon released, which already had the classic martial-industrial sound: "On the one hand monotonous-rhythmic [sic!] atmosphere, majestic and gloomy, on the other a catchy collage that makes extensive use of speech samples".

With Ars Militaria, the first full-time album was released the following year, along with the second single "Imperivm", with which Erdmann took a clear step in the direction of film music (Anthem from the Iron Flame, Europe in Flames), but at the same time began his thematization of ancient war history (Legio VI Ferrata). The title "Son of the Sun" refers to Savitri Devi's book of the same name. Reviewers criticized the "unbroken bombast" that runs throughout the album. The song "Mother of Pain" was accompanied in 2008 by an Argentine short film about German expressionism and avant-garde aesthetics.

The successor Pièce Héroique was released in 2006 on May 8. In addition to various very martial pieces ("On Wings of Steel", "Heaven and Hell") Erdmann expanded the stylistic range of his project on this album. Victoria is slightly reminiscent of the music of the medieval scene, while "Roses 4 Rome" is a flawless neofolk piece. The latter is particularly noteworthy, as this song was written with the help of Tomas Pettersson of Ordo Rosarius Equilibrio - a collaboration that would lead to the joint project TriORE with the album Three Hours in 2009.

In 2008, the album Muse in Arms was released, according to Erdmann "sonically much clearer, somewhat more filigree and musically far more mature than the releases before". In direct comparison, the album appears less warlike; the compositions are often dominated by classical ("Sonnenwalzer") as well as ominous, ambient-like ("Wir kommen wieder") elements. While previous releases were always vague in the interpretation of the period they addressed, Muse in Arms more clearly highlights the conflicts of the 20th century. For example, the song "Fatalist" uses samples from the propaganda film Ein Lied vom Stahl of the German Labor Front. Marcus Stiglegger's Icons magazine, on the other hand, interpreted the album as a musical "essay on the cult of the sun." Muse in Arms was received very positively in the scene for the most part; according to one review, Triarii had even "now established themselves at the forefront of a movement that seeks its salvation in a kind of departure for recollection".

== Critique ==
Like many bands from the neofolk and martial-industrial sector, Triarii is occasionally accused of being politically right-wing and glorifying war. Criticisms in this regard include the songs Der Verwundete (In Memoriam Arno Breker) and "Son of the Sun" (both on Ars Militaria): while the former song refers to a sculpture by Nazi sculptor Arno Breker from 1938, the latter is obviously inspired by a book of the same name by neo-Nazi esoteric Savitri Devi. The song title The inevitable Farewell of Democracy (on Pièce Héroique), the cover image of Muse in Arms, or the band motto "Vivere militare est" also seem provocative.

In interviews, Christian Erdmann himself repeatedly expressed his rejection of the function of art as an "instrument of political motivation"; art, he said, had to work with provocations "in order to draw attention to things or to stimulate thinking". The booklet accompanying the album Muse in Arms also contains the following dedication:

"Muse in Arms is dedicated to all narrow minded people

to all those, who are afraid of asking questions

and those, who are even more afraid of receiving answers

Art is never only left or right

nor is it only black and white"

Life is not that simple

— Triarii, Album booklet Muse in Arms

== Discography ==
Albums
Year	Title	Format
2005	Ars Militaria	CD
2006	Pièce Héroique	CD
2008	Muse in Arms	CD
2011	Exile	CD

Singles
Year	Title
2004	Triumph
2005	Imperivm
2008	We are One
2011	W.A.R.

== See also ==
- Ordo Rosarius Equilibrio
- Martial industrial
- Neofolk

== Bibliography ==
Michael Kuhlen: Klare Strukturen, absolute Kontrolle. Triarii-Interview in Obliveon-Magazin
