= Desiderii Marginis =

- Origin: Sweden
- Genres: Dark ambient Electronic; Industrial; Neofolk
- Years active: 1993–present
- Labels: Cold Meat Industry; Cyclic Law
- Members: Johan Levin

Desiderii Marginis is a dark ambient music project from Sweden.

== History ==
Desiderii Marginis was formed by Johan Levin in 1993 in Mjölby, Sweden as a solo project. The first three tapes Consecrare, Via Peregrinus and Triptych were originally released in very limited editions, however in 2009 these tracks were released on the retrospective album Years Lend a Golden Charm. Some of these songs appeared in new versions on Songs Over Ruins, the debut album released on Cold Meat Industry in 1997.

The album's 2007 album, Seven Sorrows, received a ten out of ten rating from Chronicles of Chaos.

== Albums ==
- Songs Over Ruins. Cold Meat Industry, 1997
- Deadbeat. Cold Meat Industry, 2001
- Strife. Cold Meat Industry, 2004
- The Ever Green Tree. Kaosthetik Distribution, 2005
- That Which Is Tragic and Timeless. Cold Meat Industry, 2005
- Seven Sorrows. Cold Meat Industry, 2007
- Years Lend a Golden Charm. (Compilation) Eternal Pride, 2009
- Procession. Cyclic Law, 2012
- Hypnosis. Cyclic Law, 2014
- Thaw. (Compilation) Zoharum, 2014
- Vita Arkivet. Cyclic Law, 2018
- Serenity / Rage. Cyclic Law, 2020
- Departed. Cyclic Law, 2020
- Bathe In Black Light. Cyclic Law, 2024
- Tragedy Ecstasy Doom. Desiderii Marginis Music, 2026

== See also ==
- List of dark ambient artists
- List of ambient music artists
