= Oniric =

Dark folk duo from Italy

- Origin: Italy
- Genres: Progressive music Folk; Martial industrial Neofolk; Dark folk Dark ambient Gothic
- Years active: 2005-present
- Label: Caustic Records
- Members: Carlo De Filippo; Gianvigo

Oniric is a dark folk duo from Italy. Formed in 2005 by Carlo De Filippo and Gianvigo (Gianpiero Timbro), the band is under contract with Caustic Records since 2009. Their sound is characterized by a mix of acoustic instruments (piano, accordion, acoustic guitars), synthesizers, electric guitars and interlaced vocals.

== Discography ==
- 2006 - Suggestioni (EP)
- 2006 - Destroy Paranoia (MCD)
- 2007 - Blessing (MCD)
- 2007 - Destroy Paranoia (MCD)
- 2008 - Boulevard Cinéma (EP)
- 2009 - Cabaret Syndrome (full-length)
- 2013 - Mannequins (full-length)
