= Coph Nia =

- Origin: Gothenburg, Västra Götaland County, Sweden
- Genres: Dark ambient
- Years active: 1999–present
- Label: Cold Meat Industry
- Members: Aldenon Sartorial
- Past members: Magnus Baecklund; Clara Pahlén; Aasa Vildblomma
- Website: cophnia.com

Coph Nia is the name given to the dark ambient act formed by Aldenon Sartorial (Mikael Aldén). Its first release was the album That Which Remains, which was released in 2000 at Cold Meat Industry. The original members were Mikael Aldén (composition), Magnus Baecklund (lyrics), Clara Pahlén (vocals on Our Lady of the Stars and Sanctus), and Aasa Vildblomma (percussion). The three latter members, however, only participated on the first album: That which Remains (2000).

The name itself derives from Chapter 3 of Aleister Crowley’s Liber AL vel Legis. The passage reads in full: “I am the Lord of the Double Wand of Power; the wand of the Force of Coph Nia—but my left hand is empty, for I have crushed an Universe; & nought remains.” (AL III:72) Itself thought to be a reference to Ain Soph.

Coph Nia's music tends to drift between dark ambient soundscapes and tracks that portray Aldenon's interest in the Western magical tradition, and the work of Aleister Crowley in particular.

The band's 2007 album, The Dark Illuminati - A Celestial Tragedy in Two Acts, received a rating of 8.5 out of ten from Chronicles of Chaos.

== Discography ==
- Erotomechankis II - split with Mindspawn, Raubbau - Raub-047, 2016
- Lashtal Lace, Raubbau - Raub-027, CD, 2015
- A Prelude To Lashtal Lace, Raubbau - Raub-026, EP/12", 2014
- The Tree of Life and Death, (self-released), Digital, 2008
- Qliphothic Phantasmagoria, Wrotycz Records - WRT 008, EP/CD, 2008
- The Dark Illuminati - A Celestial Tragedy in two acts - CD, 2007
- Erotomechaniks - with Mindspawn, Punch Records - PP009, CD (limited to 500 copies), 2005
- Noise Shaper - CDR (limited to 161 copies), 2004
- Shape Shifter - Cold Meat Industry - CMI122, CD, 2003
- Nunsploitation - split with Brighter Death Now, Cold Meat Industry - CMI110, 12", 2003
- That Which is Remade - CD, 2001
- Holy War EP - Cold Meat Industry - CMI93, MCD, 2000
- That Which Remains - Cold Meat Industry - CMI85, CD, 2000

== Compilations ==
- The Oath on Flowers Made of Snow - Cold Meat Industry - CMI130, DCD, 2004
- The Scapegoat mk. II on The Sowing - Dark Seeds - DSCS001, CD, 2001
