= In Slaughter Natives =

Swedish industrial and dark ambient project

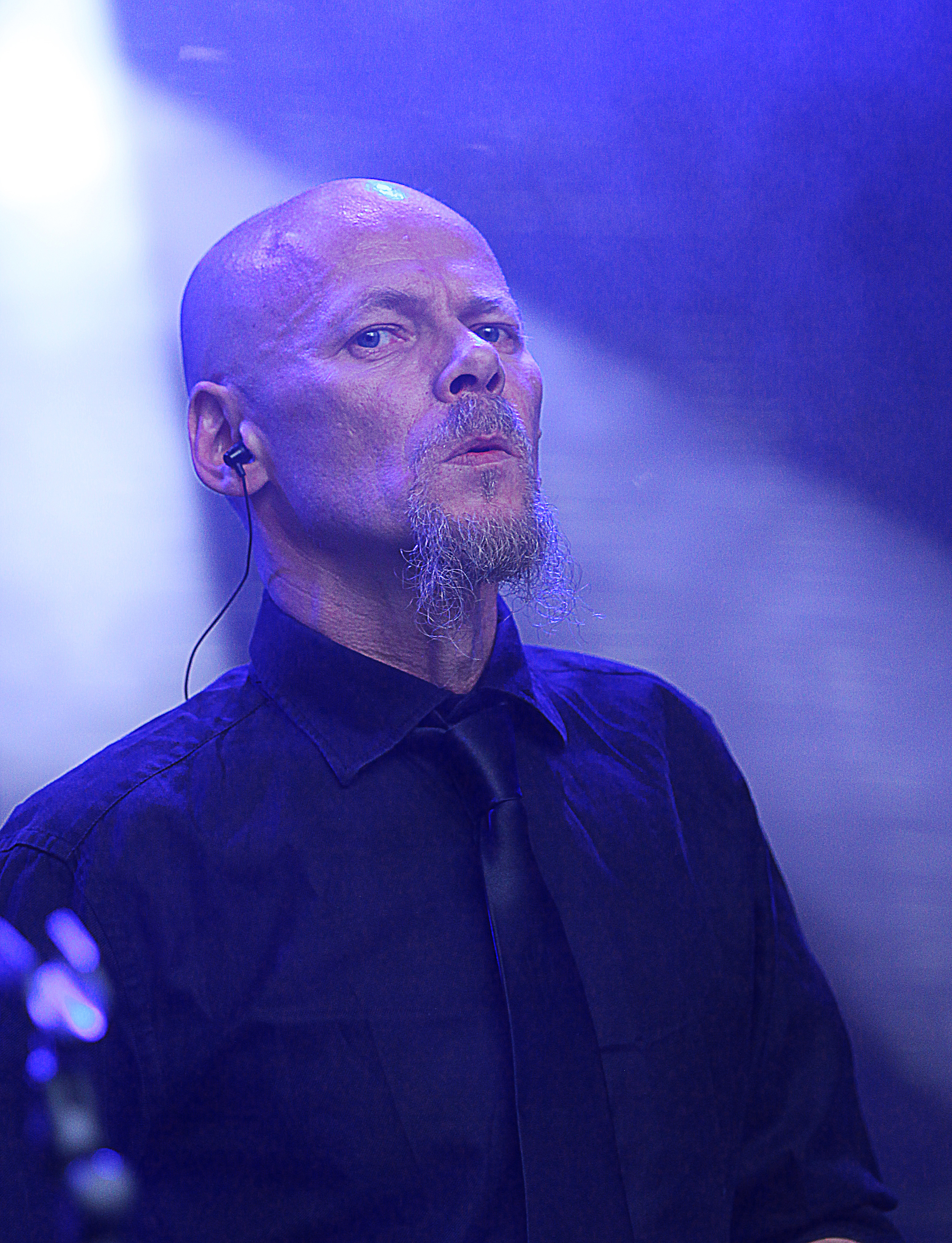

Background information
- Origin: Sweden
- Genres: Industrial, Dark ambient, Noise Music
- Years active: 1985–present
- Labels: Cold Meat Industry; Cyclic Law
- Members: Jouni Havukainen

In Slaughter Natives is an industrial and dark ambient noise music sound project created in 1985 by Swedish musician Jouni Havukainen. Since its first release in the late 80's, the project has been regarded as an innovator of the martial industrial and death industrial subgenres; and is mostly associated with the Swedish record label Cold Meat Industry.

== Discography ==
=== Albums ===
- In Slaughter Natives (1988)
- Enter Now the World (1992)
- Sacrosancts Bleed (1992)
- Mort aux Vaches (1994) - with Deutsch Nepal
- Purgate My Stain (1996)
- Resurrection (2004)
- Cannula Coma Legio (2014)
- Psicofonias - Las Voces Desconocidas (2016)
- Ventre (2016)

== Members ==
- Jouni Havukainen (1985-present)

== See also ==
- List of dark ambient artists
- List of ambient music artists
