= Karjalan sissit =

Finnish and Swedish music group

Karjalan Sissit
- Origin: Sweden, Finland
- Genres: Martial, neo-classical, noise, dark ambient
- Years active: 2000–2020
- Labels: Cold Spring, Svartvintras Productions, Eternal Soul Records, Cold Meat Industry, Cyclic Law
- Members: Markus Pesonen; Peter Bjärgö; D.F. Bragman; Mikael Lindblom; Per Ahlund
- Website: myspace.com/karjalansissit

Karjalan Sissit (Finnish for "Karelian Guerrillas") was the main musical project of Finnish musician Markus Pesonen. He combines neoclassical orchestral arrangements with elements of noise, power electronics and dark ambient. Common themes on his records are alcoholism, mental health problems and domestic violence. His current location is Eskilstuna, Sweden, and he works with Peter Bjärgö's Erebus Odora label.

== Members ==
- Markus Pesonen
- Peter Bjargo
- D.F. Bragman
- Mikael Lindblom
- Per Ahlund

== Discography ==
- Karjalan Sissit (2001)
- Miserere (2002)
- Karjalasta kajahtaa (2004)
- Tanssit on loppu nyt (2006)
- Fucking Whore Society (2009)
- ...Want You Dead (2015)
