= The Moon Lay Hidden Beneath a Cloud =

Austrian musical duo

- Also known as: TMLHBAC
- Origin: Austria
- Genres: Dark ambient; experimental; neofolk; martial industrial; post-industrial
- Years active: 1993–1998
- Label: Arthur's Round Table
- Members: Albin Julius; Alzbeth

The Moon Lay Hidden Beneath a Cloud was an Austrian musical duo composed of Albin Julius and Alzbeth. Their music reflected their deep fascination with myriad aspects of European medievalism including ritual, clerical chants and the daily experience of the peasantry.

== Overview ==
Their music combined modern electronics, tape loops and samplers with medieval instruments such as hurdy-gurdy, shawm, and Hexenscheit. Alzbeth was the primary vocalist for the group and often sang traditional songs in numerous archaic languages including Middle High German, Latin and Old French. Julius provided distorted and backup vocals.

When performing live, the band often played in old churches, fortresses, medieval prisons and theatres that provided an appropriate atmosphere for their static, militaristic performances.

Early on, the band provided no official photographs or any more information outside of a Swiss mailing address found inside of the albums. The band rarely appeared live or granted interviews. No songs were ever given official titles. After their split, both of the duo were considerably more vocal and promotional images were released.

With each subsequent release the band presented themes traveling further into European history and becoming more martial, choral and bombastic in approach, culminating in their final album; the largely World War II-inspired The Smell of Blood but Victory (1997).

In 1998, the duo, also a couple, parted ways and recorded no new material. All of the group's music was released on their own Arthur's Round Table record label and distributed by World Serpent Distribution.

== Post-Split ==
At the same time as the recording of The Smell Of Blood But Victory, Julius released material on a then-side project he called Der Blutharsch. This has subsequently become Julius' main project after the split. Julius has since played live and released some Der Blutharsch covers of TMLHBAC material that he has claimed was originally intended for Der Blutharsch.

Alzbeth did erect an official TMLHBAC website and has said that she will be releasing material by a musical project of her own.

In 2000, Alzbeth released a book after the duo parted ways. This hard-back and cloth-bound book included lyrics, photographs and references for the historical themes used by the band.

In 2004, likely spurred by the bankruptcy of World Serpent Distribution and the subsequent out of print status for the band's entire catalogue, Alzbeth announced through her mailing list that Julius and she had decided to rerelease their back catalogue in some form in the future.

Albin Julius died on May 4, 2022.

== Discography ==
=== Albums and EPs ===
Year	Title	Format, Special Notes
1993	The Moon Lay Hidden Beneath a Cloud	CD
1994	Amara tanta tyri	CD
1995	A New Soldier Follows the Path of a New King	CD
1995	Kostnice	7"
1996	Yndalongg	10"
1996	Were You of Silver, Were You of Gold?	12"/CD
1996	Madhr	7"
1996	A Night in Fear	MCD, featuring Deutsch Nepal.
1997	Untitled	7"
1997	The Smell of Blood but Victory	2xCD box including a CD 5" and poster limited to 2000 copies. Disc 1 was rereleased afterwards.
1999	Rest on Your Arms Reversed	CD, collection of all material on limited releases, all bonus tracks, compilations and unreleased material.

== Compilations ==
Year	Title	Format, Special Notes
1995	Knights of Abyss	CD
1996	ON: The World and Everything in It	CD
1996	Palace of Worms	CD
1996	Terra Serpentes	2xCD

=== Other ===
Year	Title	Format, Special Notes
2000	The Book of Lyrics	Hard-backed, cloth-bound book. Limited to 777 copies.

== See also ==
- List of ambient music artists
