= Arcana (Swedish band) =

Swedish neoclassical dark wave band

- Promo photo of Arcana, March 2026. Peter and Cecilia Bjärgö.

Background information
- Origin: Sweden
- Genres: Neoclassical dark wave, darkwave, dark ambient
- Years active: 1994–present
- Labels: Cold Meat Industry (1996–2003); Erebus Odora (2003–2006); Kalinkaland Records (2006 – 2008); Cyclic Law (2010–2022); Cold Meat Industry (2026–present)
- Members: Peter Bjärgö; Cecilia Bjärgö
- Past members: Ida Bengtsson; Ann-Mari Thim; Stefan Eriksson; Mattias Borgh; Sergi Gamez Martinez; Nuria Casal Luiz

Arcana is Swedish neoclassical dark wave band created in 1994 by Peter Bjärgö.

== History ==
The original band consisted of founder Peter Bjärgö (then Peter Pettersson) and vocalist Ida Bengtsson. Since 2002, Arcana has changed line-up and during the years 2003-2015 it consisted of Peter Bjärgö, Stefan Eriksson, Ann-Mari Thim, Ia Bjärgö and Mattias Borgh. Since some years back, Peter Bjärgö have invited different musicians for live performances, depending on the venue, location and time.

Often largely instrumental, the band describes its music as inspired by medieval music or the middle age's more romantic aspects. Their album Le Serpent Rouge had a more oriental feeling to it, with instruments like hammered dulcimer, finger cymbals, duduk and other oriental/Arabic instruments. The latest album "Magna Silentia", released on Cold Meat Industry in September 2026, the music has been more into the sacred music, with choirs mixed with the instrument nyckelharpa.

Peter also has a martial industrial side-project called Sophia and has also recorded one collaborative album with Gustaf Hildebrand.

== Discography ==
Their first album Dark Age of Reason, released on Cold Meat Industry, has been compared to the early works by Dead Can Dance.

The third album ...The Last Embrace was published in 2000. It introduced the acoustic guitar and real percussion instruments to Arcana's repertoire.

The sixth album Le Serpent Rouge was released in 2004 on Erebus Odor Records. It features orientally inspired music and a stronger integration of acoustic instruments than previously.

2008 saw the release of "Raspail" on Kalinkaland Records. Arcana's earlier Neo-classical and medieval style returned with this album.

In 2026 Arcana returned with their latest album Magna Silentia, then back again on their first label Cold Meat Industry. The album was made around the time when Peter and Ia's daughter Vendela Bjärgö passed away. The album is dedicated to her and to Peter's late mother.

=== As Arcana ===
| Year | Title | Format, Label & Notes |
|---|---|---|
| 1996 | The Hearts of Shadow Gods | 2 × Vinyl, 7", Picture Disc, Limited Edition, Compilation / Cold Meat Industry. |
| 1996 | Dark Age of Reason | 10 track CD / Cold Meat Industry. |
| 1997 | Lizabeth | 3 track CD / Cold Meat Industry. |
| 1997 | Cantar de Procella | 12 track CD / Cold Meat Industry. |
| 1999 | Isabel | 3 track CD / Cold Meat Industry. |
| 2000 | ...The Last Embrace | 10 track CD / Cold Meat Industry. |
| 2002 | Body of Sin | 2 track CD / Cold Meat Industry. |
| 2002 | Inner Pale Sun | 8 track CD / Cold Meat Industry. |
| 2004 | The New Light (Compilation) | 11 track CD / EREBUS. |
| 2004 | Le Serpent Rouge | 9 track CD / Projekt / EREBUS. |
| 2008 | Raspail | 10 track CD / Kalinkaland Records / Projekt |
| 2010 | The First Era 1996-2002 (Compilation) | 4 CD / Cyclic Law / Box which includes all album and compilation tracks until Inner Pale Sun |
| 2011 | Un Passage Silencieux | 2 track CD, Album, Limited Edition. So called "sister-release" of Le Serpent Rouge. Limited to 100 copies and only available to the owners of the Le Serpent Rouge Box. / EREBUS ODORA |
| 2012 | Emerald | 3 track CD / Cyclic Law |
| 2012 | As Bright As A Thousand Suns | 10 track CD / Cyclic Law |
| 2026 | Magna Silentia | 10 tracks CD / Cold Meat Industry |

=== As Bjärgö/Hildebrand ===
| Year | Title | Format, Label & Notes |
|---|---|---|
| 2005 | Out Of The Darkling Light, Into The Bright Shadow | CD / EREBUS. |
| 2009 | A Wave Of Bitterness | CD / Kalinkaland Records |
| 2011 | The Architecture Of Melancholy | CD / Cyclic Law |
| 2017 | Animus Retinentia | CD / Cyclic Law |
| 2019 | Structures and Downfall | CD / Cyclic Law |

== In other media ==
The remake of the Dead Can Dance song "Enigma of the Absolute" was used in the soundtrack for the popular Civilization 4 mod Fall from Heaven 2 as background music for the Runes Of Kilmorph religion.

The composition "Wings of Gabriel" was used in the soundtrack for the popular Medieval 2: Total War mod Broken Crescent as a main theme.
