= Pimentola =

- Origin: Finland
- Genres: Experimental; Post-industrial
- Years active: 1996–present
- Labels: Twilight Records; War Office Propaganda; Cold Meat Industry
- Members: Lempo

Pimentola ("The Netherworld") is an electronic orchestral/industrial project from Finland. Originally formed in 1996 by Lempo and Turja, it has since become the solo project of Lempo. Early dark/black metal influences have been dropped and experimental, industrial, neoclassical, orchestral, ethnic and tribal sounds have been added. In 2006 Pimentola was signed to the highly influential Swedish label Cold Meat Industry, which released the CD Misantropolis in 2007.

== Discography ==
- Tuoni Pauloo Tiukoin Sitein (CDr, 2004)
- Tuoni Pauloo Tiukoin Sitein (CDr, Mini, 2004)
- MM-MMV (CD, 2005)
- Pimentola (7", 2005)
- Pimentola / Dead Man's Hill (CDr, 2005)
- MM-MMV (Cass, 2006)
- Misantropolis (CD, 2007)
