= Ordo Rosarius Equilibrio =

Swedish neofolk and martial industrial music group from Stockholm

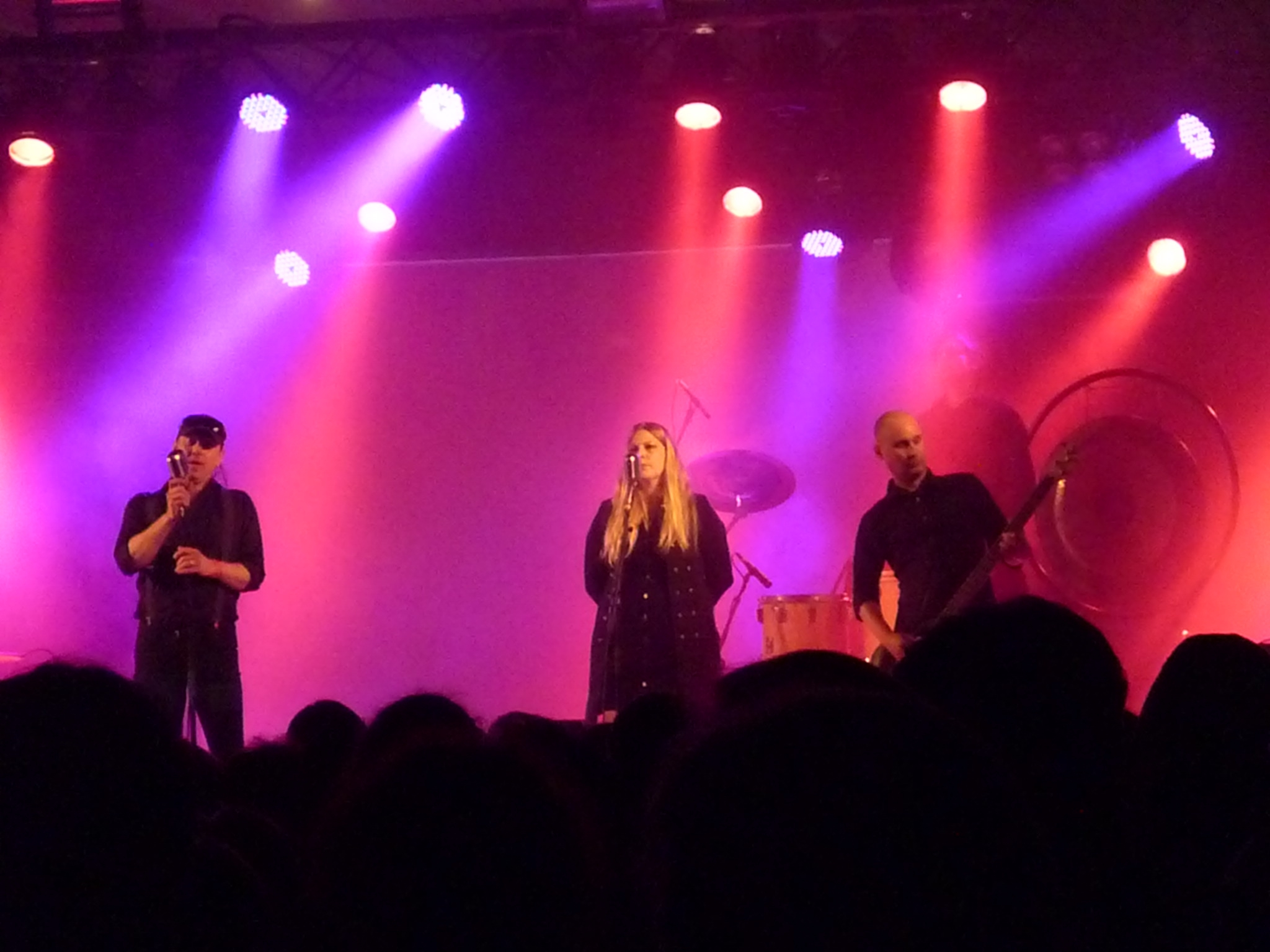
- Ordo Rosarius Equilibrio live at the Amphi festival 2011

Background information
- Also known as: ORE
- Origin: Stockholm, Sweden
- Genres: Apocalyptic folk; martial industrial; neoclassical darkwave; experimental; dark ambient
- Years active: 1993–present
- Label: Cold Meat Industry
- Members: Tomas Pettersson; Rose-Marie Larsen; Fredrik Leijström; Nicolas Van Meirhaeghe
- Past members: Chelsea Krook; Ronnie Bäck; Fredrik Bergström
- Website: Official website

Ordo Rosarius Equilibrio (ORE) is a neofolk, military pop and martial industrial music group from Stockholm. The band is composed of its founding member and vocalist Tomas Pettersson, and Rose-Marie Larsen, who replaced Chelsea Krook on backup vocals. In 2008 Fredrik Leijström and Ronnie Bäck joined the band on bass and guitar.

== Formation and history ==
In 1993, following the discontinuation of Tomas Pettersson's previous band, Archon Satani, he decided to start a new project. This project was initially called Ordo Equilibrio and joined by Chelsea Krook, his then-girlfriend. Together they made three full-length releases and one 7".

In 2001 the band had a change in line-up; Chelsea Krook was replaced by Rose-Marie Larsen. This also spawned a change in the bandname; the word Rosarius was added. The group has so far released eight albums, one 10" and a split album with Spiritual Front.

== Style ==
The band's musical style has been described as "apocalyptic pop", a neofolk subgenre. The name Ordo Rosarius Equilibrio can be translated either as "Rose Order in Equilibrium" or "...for Equilibrium" or "...through Equilibrium" (due to the ambiguity of the Latin form 'equilibrio'). The usage of Latin alludes to the naming conventions of various religious societies.

In its strident, contemplative, or sombre lyrics, Ordo Rosarius Equilibrio combines seemingly incompatible polarities, such as "creation and destruction, dark and light, joy and sorrow, sex and war". The ontology of the pair could be accurately characterised as philosophically Luciferian or Epicurean (often incorporating Christian/Catholic, or Thelemic themes but permuted idiosyncratically). Other areas of focus include the modern experience of present-day Europeans, kink/BDSM, parallels between cycles of nature and the human experience, and anomie. For example, the album Cocktails, Carnage, Crucifixion and Pornography used the initials CCCP -- Latin characters that appear identical to the abbreviation in Cyrillic for the former Soviet Union—but modified [in the band's analysis of 2003] to indicate what Russia was becoming known for at that time (according to interviews from that period).

Further sources of inspiration include Aleister Crowley, William Blake, the bands Depeche Mode, Laibach, SPK, Death In June, Current 93, Coil, writers Daniil Kharms and Ayn Rand and filmmakers Tinto Brass and Andrew Blake.

In the initial years, the band incorporated sadomasochism live on stage as well.

A wide range of instruments are used, including acoustic guitars, percussion and piano, together with various sound-aggregating devices combined with projected imagery. Lyrics are delivered, typically by Petterson himself, in a performance including spoken word and traditional song.

== Discography ==
Year	Title	Format	Producer	Catalog #
1995	Reaping the Fallen, The First Harvest (As Ordo Equilibrio)	LP/CD	Cold Meat Industry	CMI.32
1997	The Triumph of Light.... and Thy Thirteen Shadows of Love (As Ordo Equilibrio)	LP/CD	Cold Meat Industry	CMI.44
1997	I4I (As Ordo Equilibrio)	7"	Cold Meat Industry	CMI.54
1998	Conquest, Love & Self Perseverance (As Ordo Equilibrio)	LP/CD	Cold Meat Industry	CMI.64
2001	Make Love, And War; The Wedlock of Roses	CD	Cold Meat Industry	CMI.84
2001	Make Love, And War; The Wedlock of Equilibrium	CD	Cold Meat Industry	CMI.94
2001	Make Love, And War; The Wedlock of Roses, And Equilibrium	Double-LP	Cold Meat Industry	CMI.84/94
2003	Cocktails, Carnage, Crucifixion And Pornography	LP/CD	Cold Meat Industry	CMI.124
2005	Satyriasis - Somewhere Between Equilibrium And Nihilism (Split with Spiritual Front)	CD	Cold Meat Industry	CMI.144
2006	Apocalips	Double-LP/CD	Cold Meat Industry	CMI.141
2007	Four	10"	Raubbau	Raub 001
2009	O N A N I [Practice Makes Perfect]	CD+DVD/CD/LP/Picturedisc	Cold Meat Industry	CMI.191
2010	Do Angels Never Cry, And Heaven Never Fall?	CD/Maxi-Single/Enhanced/Limited Edition	Out Of Line	OUT 425
2010	Songs 4 Hate & Devotion	Double-LP/CD	Out Of Line	OUT 433
2013	4Play	CD/EP/Limited Edition/Numbered	Out Of Line	OUT 588
2016	Vision: Libertine - The Hangman's Triad	Double-LP/CD	Out Of Line	OUT 786
2019	Let's Play (two girls and a goat)	LP/CD	Out Of Line	LC 2947
2022	La Fleur Du Mal	EP/CD	Out Of Line	OUT 1224
2022	Nihilist Notes (And The Perpetual Quest 4 Meaning In Nothing)	CD/LP	Out Of Line	OUT 1169
