= Ritual Aesthetic =

US musical group

- Origin: Denver, Colorado, United States
- Genres: Industrial, EBM, aggrotech, industrial metal, darkwave, experimental noise
- Years active: 2013 - Present
- Label: Cleopatra Records
- Members: Sean Ragan; Vance Valenzuela; Mack Barrow; Nicholas Klinger
- Past members: Grant Nachbur
- Website: Ritual Aesthetic Official Facebook Page

Ritual Aesthetic (stylized as Ritual Æsthetic) is an American industrial band founded in 2013 based in Denver, Colorado, United States. The band has released two studio albums: Decollect in 2014 and Wound Garden in 2018, and an as yet unnamed third album was announced in 2020.

== History ==
Ritual Aesthetic began in 2013 as the solo project of Sean Ragan who was then drumming for Metropolis Records industrial metal band Dawn Of Ashes. Ritual Aesthetic's original style consisted of genre-blending compositions similar to that of artists like Skinny Puppy. The resulting sound was a unique blend of melodic dance rhythms, harsh metal guitar, aggressive EBM styled vocals and dark experimental noise atmospheres.

In early 2013, individual singles were uploaded to the band's various social media pages. Met with overwhelmingly positive feedback from online listeners, the band signed with UK industrial label Juggernaut Services and on April 18, 2014 released its subsequent first full length Decollect . The album featured brand new compositions, re-workings of original singles as well as remixes by Ad Noiseam artist Iszoloscope. Decollect was mixed by Los Angeles-based heavy metal producer Alex Crescioni and mastered by the German producer Sander Kapper

Decollect has been praised with critical acclaim, drawing comparisons to Wumpscut, Combichrist and Ministry. Critics praised Ritual Aesthetic's unique and heavy musical compositions as well as praising its catchy pop structured lyrical hooks, and referred to their debut album as sounding as if it came from "the 1995 heyday of the genre". The album was ranked #14 on Discogs Best Industrial Albums of 2014 category, as well as #7 in its Best Alternative Electronic Albums of 2014 list.

In Spring 2018, the band announced via Regen Magazine that they had signed with Cleopatra Records and would be releasing 2018's follow up album Wound Garden in late July. Accompanying the press announcement was a teaser single of the song "The Analog Flesh". Wound Garden was released on July 28, 2018 with the group's debut music video premiering exclusively on Sideline Magazine, directed by videographer Vicente Cordero.

On January 15, 2020, the band announced via Brutal Resonance magazine that they were aiming to release a new album in 2020, with Chris Vrenna as creative collaborator and producer. In a July interview, frontman Sean Ragan stated that due to the COVID-19 pandemic, the album had been delayed to Spring 2021. In January 2023, Ritual Aesthetic announced they would be playing their first live show in two years, supporting industrial black metal band Lykotonon at the Hi-Dive music venue in Denver.

== Discography ==
- Something To Know You By (2013) Single
- Decollect (2013) LP
- Wound Garden (2018) LP
- Blood of the Titans - Ritual Aesthetic Remix (2021) - Remix for Dawn of Ashes' EP Blood of the Titans (Remixes)

== Members ==
- Sean Ragan
- Vance Valenzuela
- Mack Barrow
- Nicholas Klinger
