= Peter Andersson (musician) =

Swedish music composer

Peter Andersson (born March 20, 1973, in Boxholm, Sweden) is a music composer within the ambient, noise, industrial, electronic and experimental genre. His interest in electronic music started when he listened to his brother's Kraftwerk albums. He records many of the sounds he uses himself, from industries, boats, fans and similar objects.

His projects are Raison D'être, Stratvm Terror, Necrophorus, Atomine Elektrine, Yantra Atmospheres, Panzar, Svasti-ayanam, Grismannen. Besides his music activities he is mostly interested in film, art, Tibetan Buddhism and meditation. Together with another musician from Boxholm, also called Peter Andersson, he runs the band Blocksholm and together with Johanna Rosenqvist the band Cataclyst.

== Raison d'être ==
Raison d'être
- Origin: Sweden
- Genres: Dark ambient
- Years active: 1991–present
- Label: Cold Meat Industry
- Members: Peter Andersson
- Website: https://raison-detre.info

Raison d'être is a dark ambient project by Andersson. The name of the band was taken from a sentence in a book by Carl Gustav Jung: "the individuation is the raison d’être of the self". Dark ambient atmospheres, drone elements, industrial sounds, ecclesiastical hymns are all blended together to constitute the music of Raison d'être. The music produced by Raison d'être is variously dark ambient and soundscape in nature. For example, synthesizers might play a droning melody over the sound of metal scraping together. Andersson often mixes tapes of Gregorian chant with his own keyboard and percussion playing.

=== Discography ===
==== Studio albums ====
- Après nous le Déluge (Cassette, 1992)

Aprés nous le Déluge (MP3, 2008)
Aprés nous le Déluge (Redux) (CD, 2012)

- Prospectus I (CD, 1993)

Prospectus I (Re-mix) (Cassette, 2005)
Prospectus I (Redux) (2xCD, 2013)

- Enthraled by the Wind of Lonelienes (CD, 1994)

Enthraled by the Wind of Lonelienes (Re-mix) (FLAC/MP3, 2007)
Enthralled by the Wind of Loneliness (Redux) (CD, 2013)

- Within the Depths of Silence and Phormations (CD, 1995)

Within the Depths of Silence and Phormations (Redux) (2xCD, 2013)

- In Sadness, Silence and Solitude (CD, 1997)

In Sadness, Silence and Solitude (Re-Issue) (CD, 2006)
In Sadness, Silence and Solitude (Expanded) (2xCD, 2014)
In Sadness, Silence and Solitude (Expanded Special Edition) (2xCD+7", 2014)

- The Empty Hollow Unfolds (CD, 2000)

The Empty Hollow Unfolds (Expanded) (2xCD, 2014)
The Empty Hollow Unfolds (Special Expanded) (3xCD, 2014)

- Requiem for Abandoned Souls (CD, 2003)

Requiem for Abandoned Souls (Expanded (2xCD, 2014)

- Metamorphyses (CD, 2006)

Metamorphyses (Expanded) (2xCD, 2014)

- The Stains of the Embodied Sacrifice (CD, 2009)

The Stains of the Embodied Sacrifice (Expanded) (2xCD, 2012)
The Stains of the Embodied Sacrifice (Special Expanded) (3xCD, 2012)

- Mise En Abyme (CD, 2014)
- Alchymeia (CD, 2018)
- Daemonum (CD, 2021)

==== Collaborations ====
- The Ring of Isvarah (Cassette, 1994)
- Semblance (Cassette, 1995)
- De Aeris In Sublunaria Influxu (Troum and Raison d'Être) (CD, 2015)

==== Compilations ====
- Conspectus (Cassette, 1994)
- Reflections from the Time of Opening (CD, 1997)

Reflections from the Time of Opening (Re-Issue) (CD, 2005)

- Lost Fragments (CD-R, 1998)

Lost Fragments (2xCD, 2002)

- Collective Archives (2xCD, 1999)
- Collected Works (CD, 2013)
- Tales from the Tabula Rasa (Early Works 1988-1991) (2xCD, 2014)

==== Live ====
- Live Archive 1 (FLAC/MP3, 2007)
- Live Archive 2 (FLAC/MP3, 2007)
- Live Archive 3 (FLAC/MP3, 2008)
- The Luminous Experience (Live in Enschede 2008) (CD, 2008)
- Live Archive (3xCD, 2010)
- When the Earth Dissolves in Ashes (Live 2010/2011) (CD, 2012)
- Feasting in Valhalla (CD, 2014)

==== Other ====
- Sakral Wounds (VHS, 1994)

== Stratvm Terror ==
Stratvm Terror is an industrial noise project of Peter Andersson, first appearing in 1993. For the project, he was joined by Tobias Larsson. After a few tapes and four CD releases this project has almost reached the same acclaimed status as Raison d'être. Stratvm Terror offers harsh, droning, aggressive and loud frequencies, though it could be considered more musical in earlier albums.
