= Cold Meat Industry =

Swedish independent record label

- Founded: 1987
- Founder: Roger Karmanik
- Defunct: 2013
- Status: Inactive
- Genre: Industrial, post-industrial, death industrial, power electronics, noise, ambient, dark ambient, neofolk
- Country of origin: Sweden
- Location: Mjölby

Cold Meat Industry was a Swedish independent record label established in 1987 by Roger Karmanik, which specialized in niche music genres such as dark ambient, death industrial, and neoclassical dark wave.

== History ==
From its inception, Cold Meat Industry gained a reputation for introducing artists that were unique and musically innovative. The label also became known for its contributions to the Gothic and industrial scenes.

The term "Cold Meat Industry" eventually became a musical genre of sorts, referring mostly to avant-garde artists who were influenced by industrial and dark ambient music.

In 2013 the label seemed to have stopped all activities. A notification posted in 2014 on the official Cold Meat Industry Facebook page claimed the official end of the label.

=== Sound Source ===
Sound Source was a short-lived (1991–1992) side-label of CMI. It was specialized in releasing limited tape editions of many CMI artists' debuts, such as Archon Satani, Brighter Death Now, Megaptera, Deutsch Nepal, raison d'être and others.

== Legacy ==
As of 2009, the core of the label's activity appeared to be presented by traditional CMI bands such as Ordo Rosarius Equilibrio and In Slaughter Natives, whose members collaborated closely with CMI's boss Roger Karmanik.

In January 2023, a documentary film project centered on Cold Meat Industry, directed by Claudio Marino and produced by Artax Film, was successfully funded on crowdfunding platform Indiegogo.

== Notable artists ==
- Aghast
- Anenzephalia
- Arcana
- Ataraxia
- Atomine Elektrine
- Atrium Carceri
- Blood Axis
- Brighter Death Now
- Coph Nia
- Desiderii Marginis
- Deutsch Nepal
- Folkstorm
- In Blind Embrace
- In Slaughter Natives
- Karjalan Sissit
- Knifeladder
- Morthound
- Mortiis
- Mz.412
- Ordo Rosarius Equilibrio
- Pimentola
- Proscriptor
- Puissance
- Raison d'être
- Rome
- Sanctum
- Spiritual Front
- Valefor
- XXX Atomic Toejam

== See also ==
- List of record labels
