= Brighter Death Now =

Swedish electronic musician

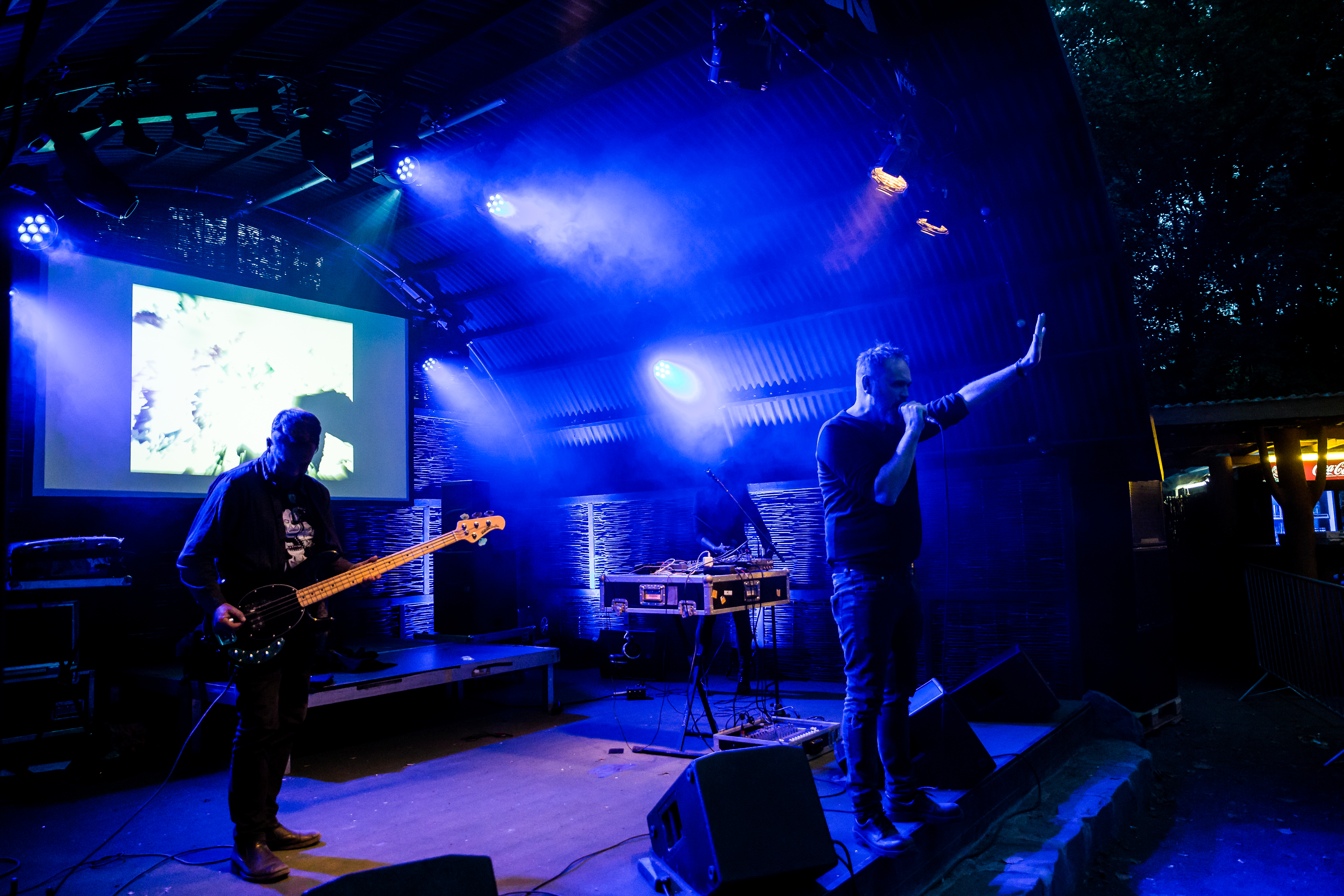
- Brighter Death Now at Nocturnal Culture Night 13 2018

Background information
- Origin: Sweden
- Genres: Death industrial; power electronics; dark ambient
- Years active: 1989–present
- Labels: Cold Meat Industry; Familjegraven; Tesco Distribution
- Members: Roger Karmanik

Brighter Death Now is the artist name under which Roger Karmanik (b. 1965 as Roger Karlsson), the founder of the Swedish record label Cold Meat Industry, releases death industrial, power electronics and dark ambient music.

Whereas early Brighter Death Now recordings tended to be largely instrumental and atmospherically oriented, present-day releases often feature screamed vocals, distorted beyond comprehension. Throughout its history, Karmanik has kept his music's thematic elements focused on such topics as child molestation, sadism, and psychosis.

The Great Death trilogy and May All Be Dead have become rare collector's items, and are sought after by many Brighter Death Now fans. Roger Karmanik has been active under other names such as Lille Roger (Swedish for Little Roger) and Bomb The Daynursery.

In 2009, Karmanik remixed the short films of Jason LaRay Keener as projection for live shows.

Karmanik closed down Cold Meat Industries around the beginning of 2014 as he expressed that he was suffering mentally and physically from the stress of running the label. By the end of 2014, Karmanik had fully immersed himself within the shroud of Brighter Death Now and announced the creation of his new label Familjegraven whose sole purpose is to release his own projects, including rarities, reissues, and new recordings.

== Discography ==
=== As Brighter Death Now ===
Year	Title	Format	Notes
1989	Temp Tations	Cassette release. Ltd. to 50 copies.	
1989	Pain in Progress	1989 (Unclean Production/Cold Meat Industry) URD 08 90 12 33-01/CMI-03	LP. Compilation of two recordings originally released on two distinct "Pain in Progress" cassettes: in 1988 under the pseudonym Bomb the Daynursery for the seven opening tracks, and later on as Brighter Death Now for the seven last tracks. Shatterer Of Earth/Pain In Progress/Certified Dead/Deathkomh (Unreeased)/ Dachau-Anthem/Still Murder/Meat Improvement/Heart Of Stone/ Meat Improvement (Video Version)
1990	Great Death	LP.(Cold Meat Industry) CMI-09 Ltd.of 500 copieslater reissued as first CD on Great Death I-II	Great Death/Erisceration/Certified Death/Gore/Moribund/Laudate Dominum
1989	Slaughterhouse Invitation	Cassette release, later released as part of 'The Slaughterhouse' CD	
1993	The Slaughterhouse	CD.	
1993	Great Death I-II	2xCD. Ltd. to 1500 copies.	
1995	Necrose Evangelicum	CD. Features Mortiis on the title track.	
1996	Great Death III	CD. Only available by mail-order via coupon in Great Death I-II	
1996	Brighter Death Now - Nordvinterdöd/Kill 7”Pic	(Pain In Progress) PAIN001 Ltd. of 300 copies. Recorded at the Soul Grave	
1996	Nordvinterdöd	7" single. Only available by mail-order via coupon in Great Death III	
1996	No Salvation/No Tomorrow	7"/10" single	
1996	Innerwar	1996 (Cold Meat Industry) CMI-45 LP/CD	Innerwar/American Tale/No Pain/Happy Nation/Little Baby/Sex Or Violence ?/No Tomorrow/War
1998	Greatest Death	CD - compilation of tracks from all 3 parts of the Great Death trilogy	
1999	May All Be Dead	1998 (Cold Meat Industry) CMI-67 Ltd. of 1000 copies 2xLP/CD	I Hate You/I Wish I Was A Little Girl/Behind Curtains/Payday/Oh What A Night/Fourteen
1999	XN Recordings 005	Ltd. edition 7" single (486 copies)	
2000	Obsessis	LP/CD	
2001	1890	LP.	2001 (Cold Meat Industry) CMI-101 Ltd. of 800 copies I/II/III/IV
2001	Why	12" single	2001 (JINX) Ltd. of 777 copies Why/Never Again !
2003	Brighter Death Now/Coph Nia - Nunsploitation LP	(Cold Meat Industry) CMI 110 Ltd. of 666 copies	A Tribute To The Leather Nun A-Side: Slow Death (Slow Mix) Brighter Death Now. B-Side: Prime Mover (Sex Mix) Coph Nia. Several versions have the labels inverted (A-side is the Coph Nia track, B-side is the Brighter Death Now track)
2005	Disobey	CD+DVD dualdisc in A5 pack. Live recordings.	
2005	Kamikaze Kabaret	CD.	
2005	Brighter Death Now/Proiekt Hat 7”	(XN Rec.) Xn 009 Ltd. of 486 copies	Covers of the Can You Feel It (The Jacksons) (renamed 'Feel', Proiekt hat) and Bad (Michael Jackson) (Brighter death now)
2007	1890 LP	(Cold Meat Industry) CMI- 169 Rekreation Stálbad	V/VI/VII/VIII/IX
2008	Necrose Evangelicum LP/2CD	(Cold Meat Industry) CMI- 179	Re-release of the 1995 album. The CD release includes a bonus CD 'Unlive in Finland 1996'. LP ltd. to 500 copies.
2009	Where Dreams Come True	(Cold Meat Industry, JINX) CMI196, JINX CD-003	Live recording in Chicago, 13 June 2003
2009	Breaking Down Nihil	(Der Angriff, Indiestate Distribution) Angriff Nr. 37, IST 073 CD	This release was made to support the Russian shows of Brighter Death Now tour "Breaking Down Nihil!" which took place in Moscow and Saint-Petersburg in September 2009. Ltd. to 150 copies; intended sale only at these shows.
2011	Very little fun	Cold Meat Industry CMI209 (3xCD/4xLP)	
2014	With promises of death	Familjegraven GRAV-01	There are two versions, a US version and a European version, which have a different end track

=== As Bomb The Daynursery ===
Year	Title	Format & Notes
1983	Discipline Through Mental Illness	Cassette release. Ltd. to 50 copies.
1983	Pain In Progress	Cassette release, later reissued on CD under Brighter Death Now name

=== As Lille Roger ===
Year	Title	Format & Notes
1985	Metrom Evil 84'	Cassette. Ltd. to 84 copies
1985	For Life	Cassette
1985	Despise/A Celebration	LP, split with Verboten
1986	Älskar Dig	Cassette
1986	Rock N Roll 85-86 / Sillmjölke	Cassette, split with Engürdetz. Ltd. 27 copies
1987	Undead	7"
1993	Golden Shower	CD compilation of tracks from previous releases
2018	Undead	6-LP compilation
