= Martial industrial =

Music genre

- Other names: Military pop
- Stylistic origins: Industrial; neoclassical dark wave; neofolk; marches; dark ambient
- Cultural origins: 1980s, Europe

Martial industrial is an offshoot of industrial music characterized by noise, dark ambient atmospheres, neofolk melodies, dark wave tunes and neoclassical orchestrations as well as the incorporation of audio from military marches, historical speeches and political, apolitical or metapolitical lyrics. Unlike other post-industrial genres, martial industrial is typically interested more in a particular worldview or philosophy than pure experimentalism.

== History ==
Laibach were one of the first bands to incorporate military marches in their industrial music and display politically provocative aesthetics. Front 242 was also known for adding a futuristic military influence to their music too. Boyd Rice and Douglas P., the noise and neofolk pioneers, respectively, adopted such attitude at several occasions to its extreme. Allerseelen, either through ritual hymns or alchemical folklore followed in the same vein. Similarly militant but less provocative and more esoteric were the heroic choral outputs of ACTUS. Les Joyaux de la Princesse developed the genre further, offering a particularly mesmerizing style of dark ambient intermingled with historical samples, speeches and interbellum chansons. The Moon Lay Hidden Beneath a Cloud / Der Blutharsch enriched this tradition, adding darkwave medieval melodies to the mix. Finally, In Slaughter Natives and Puissance expanded the genre towards orchestral and neoclassical paths, respectively.

== Characteristics ==
The term 'Martial' does not necessarily refer only to military drumming but in general to ominous/dramatic atmospheres and a particular thematology, style, aesthetics and world view. Similarly, the term 'industrial' does not denote only old-school industrial music, but rather the broad spectrum of post-industrial scene (from neofolk acoustics to harsh noise). Thus, sonically diverse bands like Genocide Organ (power electronics), Oda Relicta (sacral), Stahlwerk 9 (industrial), N.K.V.D. (industrial black metal), Die Weisse Rose (darkwave), Axon Neuron/Vagwa (dark ambient), Feindflug (EBM), Gae Bolg and the Church of Fand (medieval), H.E.R.R. (neoclassical) and Scivias (neofolk) can all be grouped under the umbrella of 'martial industrial'.

Martial industrial music frequently uses imagery related to war, totalitarian regimes, European nationalism, military displays, and political mass gatherings – contexts where the individual is subsumed by history and the mass will. A range of philosophical, political, or religious themes with an illiberal, anti-cosmopolitan, and anti-egalitarian bias predominate, such as Friedrich Nietzsche's Übermensch, Oswald Spengler's pessimistic vision of Western decline, Mircea Eliade's theories about sacred practice and symbolism, René Guénon's writings on the "spiritual degeneration" of the West, Ernst Jünger's ideas about the renewing power of war and adversity, Julius Evola's revolutionary mysticism and Nazi mysticism.

Martial industrial is produced world-wide. However, the scene is particularly strong in Germany, Hungary, France, Italy, Poland and Russia.

== Politics ==
Some bands (Von Thronstahl) openly declare interests in learning of fascistic ideology, while others (Kraschau) favor monarchism, but some others (Militia) are eco-anarchists. Some explore the erotic dimension of history and uniform aesthetics (Ordo Rosarius Equilibrio). Occasionally, martial industrial artists do not even touch historical/political issues. Other bands that touch such issues and use politically incorrect imagery (Turbund Sturmwerk) refuse to disclose their real convictions.

== Related subjects ==
- March music
- Military band
