= Industrial music =

Music genre

Industrial
- Other names: Industrial
- Stylistic origins: Rock; electronic; avant-garde; noise; musique concrète; electroacoustic; free improvisation; performance art; sound collage; tape music; futurism; dada; fluxus; sound poetry; indeterminacy; sound art; found sound; aleatoric music; actionism
- Cultural origins: Early-to-mid-1970s, United States, United Kingdom, and Germany

Subgenres
- Post-industrial; power electronics (complete list)

Regional scenes
- Australia; Germany; United Kingdom; United States (Chicago)

Other topics
- Experimental music; post-punk; synth-pop; Japanoise; no wave; cyberpunk

Industrial music (or simply industrial) is a subgenre of experimental music that emerged in the mid-to late 1970s, primarily inspired by industrial society, while drawing influences from avant-garde and early electronic music genres such as musique concrète, tape music, noise and sound collage. The term was coined in 1976 by Monte Cazazza and adopted by Throbbing Gristle with the founding of Industrial Records. Other early industrial musicians include NON and Cabaret Voltaire. By the late 1970s, additional artists emerged such as Clock DVA, Nocturnal Emissions, Einstürzende Neubauten, SPK, Nurse with Wound, and Z'EV.

During the 1980s, following the disbanding of Throbbing Gristle, industrial music splintered into a range of offshoots collectively labelled "post-industrial music", these included, EBM, new beat, hard beat, dark ambient, neofolk, power noise, industrial dance, electro-industrial, dark electro, aggrotech, industrial rock, industrial metal, cyber metal, Neue Deutsche Härte, martial industrial, industrial hip-hop and industrial techno. By the 1990s, elements of industrial music were made accessible to mainstream audiences through the popularity of acts such as Nine Inch Nails, Ministry, Rammstein, and Marilyn Manson, all of whom released platinum-selling records.

== Etymology ==
According to the Oxford English Dictionary, the genre was first named in 1942 when The Musical Quarterly called Dmitri Shostakovich's 1927 Symphony No. 2 "the high tide of 'industrial music'." Similarly, in 1972, The New York Times described works by Ferde Grofé (especially 1935's A Symphony in Steel) as part of "his 'industrial music' genre [that] called on such instruments as four pairs of shoes, two brooms, a locomotive bell, a pneumatic drill and a compressed-air tank". Though these compositions are not directly tied to what the genre would become, they are early examples of music designed to mimic machinery noise and factory atmosphere. Italian Futurist Luigi Russolo laid the groundwork for industrial music with his book and work The Art of Noises (1913), which aimed to reflect "the sounds of a modern industrial society".

== Characteristics ==
Industrial music was a response to "an age [in which] the access and control of information were becoming the primary tools of power," defined primarily as a musical reflection of post-industrial society, with its rampant use of contemporary technology and incorporation of unconventional modernist lyricism and themes not commonly found in popular music. Industrial artists drew influence from modernist literature, art, philosophy and avant-garde music, rejecting formal rock music conventions, with Industrial Records wanting to use the term "industrial" to evoke the idea of music created for a new generation. Artist Genesis P-Orridge stated:

[...] there's an irony in the word 'industrial' because there's the music industry. And then there's the joke we often used to make in interviews about churning out our records like motorcars, that sense of industrial. And [...] up till then the music had been kind of based on the blues and slavery, and we thought it was time to update it to at least Victorian times—you know, the Industrial Revolution.

Early industrial music made by groups such as Cabaret Voltaire and Throbbing Gristle, featured tape editing, stark percussion, vocal effects and loops which were distorted. Throbbing Gristle opposed traditional rock music structures associated with the punk rock scene, declaring industrial to be "anti-music." Early industrial performances often involved taboo-breaking, provocative elements, such as mutilation, sado-masochistic elements and totalitarian imagery or symbolism, as well as forms of audience abuse, such as Throbbing Gristle's aiming high powered lights at the audience.

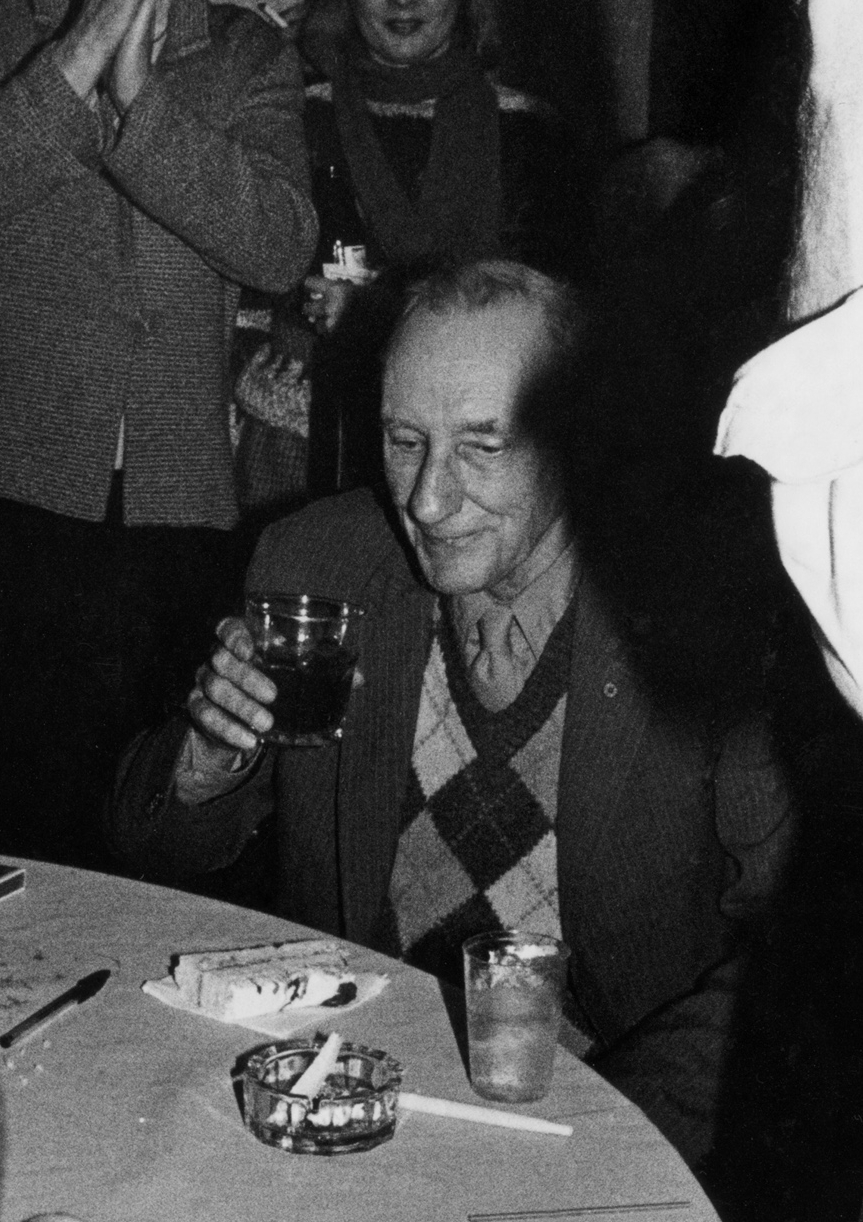
William S. Burroughs's writings became a conceptual inspiration for the industrial music movement

Artists often played in non-traditional ways, incorporating the use of homemade instruments, such as Chris Carter of Throbbing Gristle who invented a device named the "Gristle-izer", played by Peter Christopherson, which consisted of a one-octave keyboard and a number of cassette machines triggering various pre-recorded sounds. Cabaret Voltaire's Chris Watson custom-built a fuzzbox for Richard H. Kirk's guitar, which produced a unique timbre. Carter built speakers, effects units, and synthesizer modules, as well as modifying more conventional rock instrumentation, for Throbbing Gristle. Cosey Fanni Tutti played guitar with a slide in order to produce glissandi, or pounded the strings as if it were a percussion instrument. Throbbing Gristle also played at very high volume and produced ultra-high and sub-bass frequencies in an attempt to produce physical effects, labelling this approach as "metabolic music". AllMusic defines industrial music as the "most abrasive and aggressive fusion of rock and electronic music".

Industrial groups typically focus on transgressive subject matter. In his introduction for the Industrial Culture Handbook (1983), Jon Savage considered some hallmarks of industrial music to be organizational autonomy, shock tactics, and the use of synthesizers and "anti-music." Furthermore, an interest in the investigation of "cults, wars, psychological techniques of persuasion, unusual murders (especially by children and psychopaths), forensic pathology, venereology, concentration camp behavior, the history of uniforms and insignia" and Aleister Crowley's magick was present in Throbbing Gristle's work, as well as in other industrial pioneers. William S. Burroughs's recordings and writings were particularly influential on the scene, particularly his interest in the cut-up technique and noise as a method of disrupting societal control. Many of the first industrial musicians were interested in, though not necessarily sympathetic with, fascism. Throbbing Gristle's logo was based on the lightning symbol of the British Union of Fascists, while the Industrial Records logo was a photo of Auschwitz.

== Background ==
=== 1910s–1960s: Forerunners ===
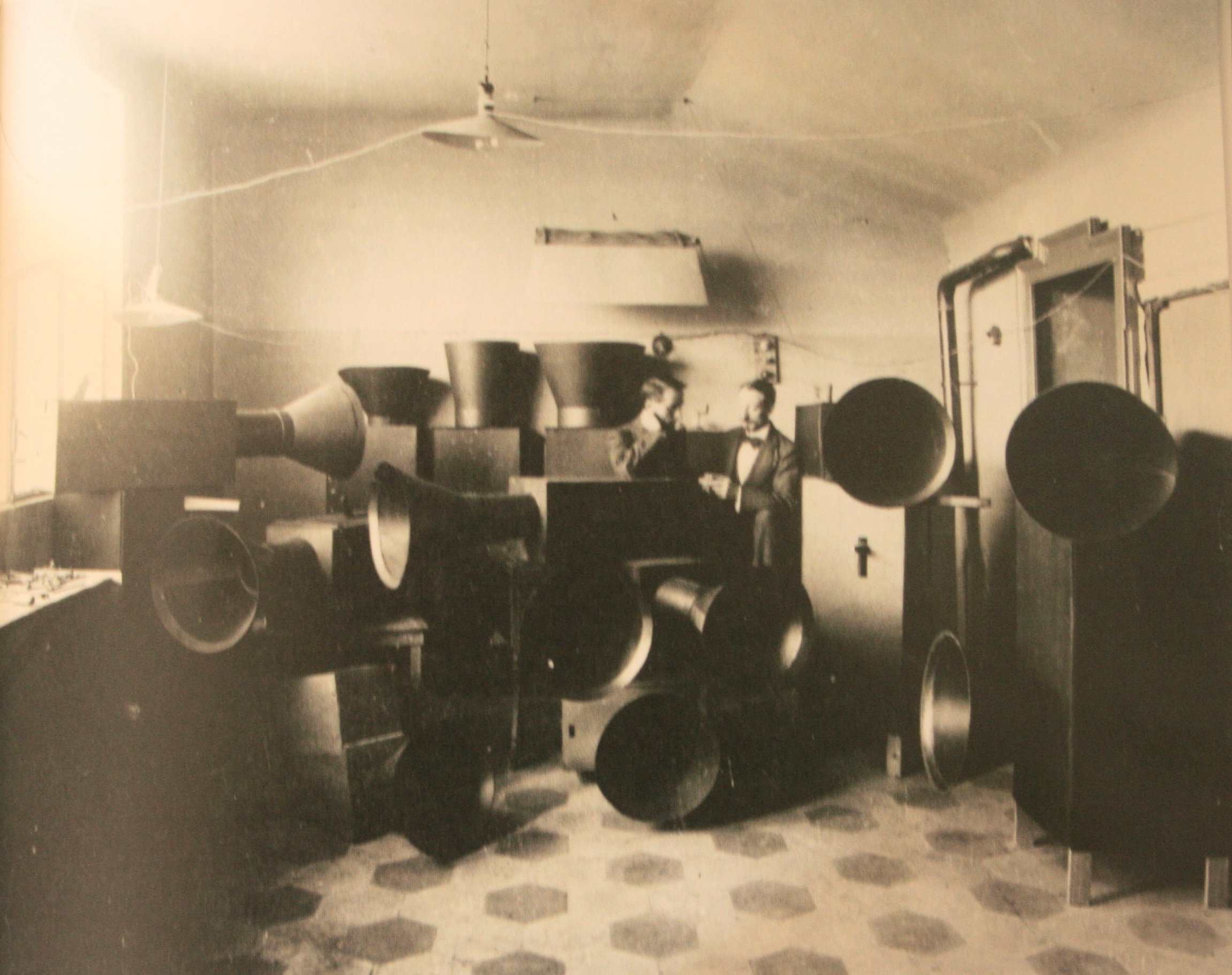
Luigi Russolo and his assistant Ugo Piatti in their Milan studio in 1913 with the Intonarumori (noise machines)

In 1913, Italian Futurist Luigi Russolo laid the groundwork for industrial with his manifesto The Art of Noises (1913) which aimed to reflect "the sounds of a modern industrial society". Around the same time, the utilisation of found sound as a musical resource was starting to be explored. An early example is Parade, a performance produced at the Chatelet Theatre, Paris, on May 18, 1917, that was conceived by Jean Cocteau, with design by Pablo Picasso, choreography by Leonid Massine, and music by Eric Satie. The extra-musical materials used in the production were referred to as trompe l'oreille sounds by Cocteau and included a dynamo, Morse code machine, sirens, steam engine, airplane motor, and typewriters. Arseny Avraamov's composition Symphony of Factory Sirens involved navy ship sirens and whistles, bus and car horns, factory sirens, cannons, foghorns, artillery guns, machine guns, hydro-airplanes, a specially designed steam-whistle machine creating noisy renderings of Internationale and Marseillaise for a piece conducted by a team using flags and pistols when performed in the city of Baku in 1922.

In 1923, Arthur Honegger created Pacific 231, a modernist musical composition that imitates the sound of a steam locomotive. Another example is Ottorino Respighi's 1924 orchestral piece Pines of Rome, which included the phonographic playback of a nightingale recording. Also in 1924, George Antheil created a work titled Ballet Mécanique with instrumentation that included 16 pianos, 3 airplane propellers, and 7 electric bells. The work was originally conceived as music for the Dada film of the same name, by Dudley Murphy and Fernand Léger, but in 1926 it premiered independently as a concert piece.

In an essay written in 1937, John Cage expressed an interest in using extra-musical materials and came to distinguish between found sounds, which he called noise, and musical sounds, examples of which included: rain, static between radio channels, and "a truck at fifty miles per hour". Essentially, Cage made no distinction, in his view all sounds have the potential to be used creatively. His aim was to capture and control elements of the sonic environment and employ a method of sound organisation, a term borrowed from Varese, to bring meaning to the sound materials. Cage began in 1939 to create a series of works that explored his stated aims, the first being Imaginary Landscape #1 for instruments including two variable speed turntables with frequency recordings.

In 1964, John Cale recorded the track "Loop" which consisted solely of audio feedback in a locked groove, it was released in 1966 as a single credited to the Velvet Underground, who were later noted as influential to industrial music. AMM, formed in 1965, were later retroactively recognized by AllMusic as precursors to industrial, writing that the "experimentation in sonic assault, noise, and chance sound (including transistor radios)" on their debut album AMMMusic (1967) would "reach the rock fringes in the work of industrial groups like Test Dept". Additionally, Cromagnon's album Orgasm (1969) has been cited by AllMusic's Alex Henderson as foreshadowing industrial with the track "Caledonia" resembling "a Ministry or Revolting Cocks recording from 1989".

Other contemporaneous developments include the work of underground and psychedelic acts such as the Mothers of Invention, Intersystems, Musica Elettronica Viva, Red Krayola, and Fifty Foot Hose. In 1968, the Beatles' The White Album incorporated influences from musique concrète on track "Revolution 9", alongside George Harrison's Electronic Sound and John Lennon's avant-garde collaborations with Yoko Ono who had been a part of the New York Fluxus scene.

Subsequently, Germany's krautrock scene would also be recognized as influential, the 1970 album Klopfzeichen by Kluster recorded in 1969 has been retroactively recognized as an early precursor of industrial music, alongside the early works of kosmische musik band Cluster, which XLR8 magazine described as having "a profound impact on industrial music's brainier practitioners". Writer Alexei Monroe argues that Kraftwerk were particularly significant in the development of industrial music, as the "first successful artists to incorporate representations of industrial sounds into nonacademic electronic music."

Additionally, New York band Suicide, formed in 1970, by Alan Vega and Martin Rev, were retroactively described by the Guardian as "equally influential on the industrial music [...] scenes that followed." The New York Times retroactively described the American avant-garde band the Residents, whose earliest demos date to 1969, as having "presaged forms of [...] industrial music".

=== Influences ===
Early industrial musicians drew influence from modernist art and literature. SPK appreciated Jean Dubuffet, Marcel Duchamp, Jean Baudrillard, Michel Foucault, Walter Benjamin, Marshall McLuhan, Friedrich Nietzsche, and Gilles Deleuze, as well as being inspired by the manifesto of the eponymous Socialist Patients' Collective. Cabaret Voltaire took conceptual cues from William S. Burroughs, J. G. Ballard, and Tristan Tzara. Whitehouse and Nurse with Wound dedicated some of their work to the Marquis de Sade; the latter also took impetus from the Comte de Lautréamont. Artists drew influences from avant-garde and abstract art movements such as Dada, Fluxus, and Viennese Actionism.

Subsequently, musicians cited as inspirations include the Velvet Underground, Joy Division, and Martin Denny. Genesis P-Orridge of Throbbing Gristle had a cassette recording library by the Master Musicians of Joujouka, Kraftwerk, Charles Manson, and William S. Burroughs. P-Orridge also credited 1960s rock such as the Doors, Pearls Before Swine, the Fugs, Captain Beefheart, and Frank Zappa in a 1979 interview. Germany's krautrock scene which included groups like Faust and Neu! was also noted as an influence on industrial artists, alongside John Cage who was an initial inspiration for Throbbing Gristle.

Chris Carter also enjoyed and found inspiration in Pink Floyd and Tangerine Dream. Boyd Rice was influenced by the music of '60s girl groups and tiki culture. Z'EV cited Christopher Tree (Spontaneous Sound), John Coltrane, Miles Davis, Tim Buckley, Jimi Hendrix, and Captain Beefheart, among others together with Tibetan, Balinese, Javanese, Indian, and African music as influential in his artistic life. Cabaret Voltaire cited Roxy Music as their initial forerunners, as well as Kraftwerk's Trans-Europe Express. Cabaret Voltaire also recorded pieces reminiscent of musique concrète and composers such as Morton Subotnick. Nurse with Wound cited a long list of obscure music as recommended listening. 23 Skidoo borrowed from Fela Kuti and Miles Davis's On the Corner. Many industrial groups, including Einstürzende Neubauten, took inspiration from world music.

== History ==
=== Origins: 1970s–1980s ===
The term "industrial music" in the context of an alternative music scene was originally coined by artist Monte Cazazza in 1976 as "Industrial Music for Industrial People," which became the strapline for the record label Industrial Records, founded by Throbbing Gristle. The first wave of industrial music began with Throbbing Gristle, formed in Yorkshire; Cabaret Voltaire, from Sheffield; and Boyd Rice (recording under the name NON), from the United States. Their production was not limited to music, but included mail art, performance art, installation pieces and other art forms.

Throbbing Gristle first performed in 1976, and began as the musical offshoot of the Kingston upon Hull-based COUM Transmissions. COUM was initially a psychedelic rock group, but began to describe their work as performance art in order to obtain grants from the Arts Council of Great Britain. COUM was composed of P-Orridge and Cosey Fanni Tutti. Beginning in 1972, COUM staged several performances inspired by Fluxus and Viennese Actionism. These included various acts of sexual and physical abjection. Peter Christopherson, an employee of commercial artists Hipgnosis, joined the group in 1974, with Carter joining the following year. The group renamed itself Throbbing Gristle in September 1975, their name coming from a northern English slang word for an erection. The group's first public performance, in October 1976, was alongside an exhibit titled Prostitution, which included pornographic photos of Tutti as well as used tampons. Conservative politician Nicholas Fairbairn declared that "public money is being wasted here to destroy the morality of our society" and blasted the group as "wreckers of civilization."

By the late 1970s, industrial music acts such as Clock DVA, Nocturnal Emissions, Whitehouse, Nurse with Wound, and SPK soon followed. Whitehouse intended to play "the most brutal and extreme music of all time", a style they eventually called power electronics. An early collaborator with Whitehouse, Steve Stapleton, formed Nurse with Wound, who experimented with noise sculpture and sound collage. Clock DVA described their goal as borrowing equally from surrealist automatism and "nervous energy sort of funk stuff, body music that flinches you and makes you move." 23 Skidoo, like Clock DVA, merged industrial music with African-American dance music, but also performed a response to world music. Performing at the first WOMAD Festival in 1982, the group likened themselves to Indonesian gamelan. Swedish act Leather Nun were signed to Industrial Records in 1978, being the first non-TG/Cazazza act to have an IR-release. Their singles eventually received significant airplay in the United States on college radio.

Industrial Culture Handbook reference guide to the philosophy and interests of a flexible alliance of "deviant" artists

Across the Atlantic, similar experiments were taking place. In San Francisco, performance artist Monte Cazazza began recording noise music. Boyd Rice released several albums of noise, with guitar drones and tape loops creating a cacophony of repetitive sounds. In Boston, Sleep Chamber and other artists from Inner-X-Musick began experimenting with a mixture of powerful noise and early forms of EBM. In Italy, work by Maurizio Bianchi at the beginning of the 1980s also shared this aesthetic. In Germany, Einstürzende Neubauten mixed metal percussion, guitars, and unconventional instruments (such as jackhammers and bones) in stage performances that often damaged the venues in which they played. Blixa Bargeld, inspired by Antonin Artaud and an enthusiasm for amphetamines, also originated an art movement called Die Genialen Dilettanten. Bargeld is particularly well known for his hissing scream.

In January 1984, Einstürzende Neubauten performed a Concerto for Voice and Machinery at the Institute of Contemporary Arts (the same site as COUM's Prostitution exhibition), drilling through the floor and eventually sparking a riot. This event received front-page news coverage in England. Other groups who practiced a form of industrial "metal music" (that is, produced by the sounds of metal crashing against metal) include Test Dept, Laibach, and Die Krupps, as well as Z'EV and SPK. Test Dept were largely inspired by Russian Futurism and toured to support the 1984–85 UK miners' strike. Skinny Puppy embraced a variety of industrial forefathers and created a lurching, impalatable whole from many pieces. Swans, from New York City, also practiced a metal music aesthetic, though reliant on standard rock instrumentation. Laibach, a Slovenian group who began while Yugoslavia remained a single state, were very controversial for their iconographic borrowings from Stalinist, Nazi, Titoist, Dada, and Russian Futurist imagery, conflating Yugoslav patriotism with its German authoritarian adversary. Slavoj Žižek has defended Laibach, arguing that they and their associated Neue Slowenische Kunst art group practice an overidentification with the hidden perverse enjoyment undergirding authority that produces a subversive and liberatory effect. In simpler language, Laibach practiced a type of agitprop that was widely utilized by industrial and punk artists on both sides of the Atlantic.

Following the breakup of Throbbing Gristle, P-Orridge and Christopherson founded Psychic TV and signed to a major label. Their first album was much more accessible and melodic than the usual industrial style, and included hired work by trained musicians. Later work returned to the sound collage and noise elements of earlier industrial. They also borrowed from funk and disco. P-Orridge also founded Thee Temple ov Psychick Youth, a quasi-religious organization that produced video art. Psychic TV's commercial aspirations were managed by Stevo of Some Bizzare Records, who released many of the later industrial musicians, including Einstürzende Neubauten, Test Dept, and Cabaret Voltaire.

Around 1983, Cabaret Voltaire members were deeply interested in funk music and, with the encouragement of their friends from New Order, began to develop a form of dark but danceable electrofunk. Christopherson left Psychic TV in 1983 and formed Coil with John Balance. Coil made use of gongs and bullroarers in an attempt to conjure "Martian," "homosexual energy". David Tibet, a friend of Coil's, formed Current 93, alongside Douglas P. of Death In June, Steven Stapleton and Fritz Catlin of 23 Skidoo; both Coil and Current 93 were inspired by amphetamines and LSD. J. G. Thirlwell, a co-producer with Coil, developed a version of black comedy in industrial music, borrowing from lounge as well as noise and film music. In the early 1980s, the Chicago-based record label Wax Trax! and Canada's Nettwerk helped to expand the industrial music genre into the more accessible electro-industrial and industrial rock genres.

=== Late 1980s–1990s ===
==== Proliferation ====
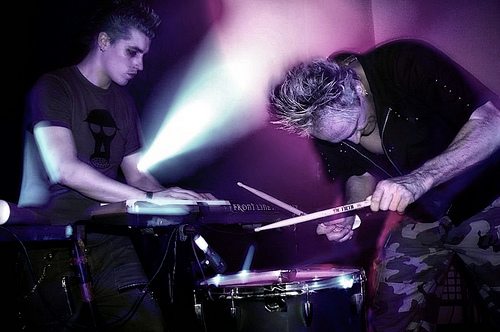
Electro-industrial group Front Line Assembly

Following the disbanding of Throbbing Gristle in the 1980s, industrial music splintered into a range of offshoots collectively labelled "post-industrial music". While the original industrial sound was rooted in avant-garde and experimental music, post-industrial offered more accessible and diverse offshoots, with the incorporation of traditional pop songwriting, and influences from a variety of genres. Artists incorporated influences from new wave, rock, pop, heavy metal, hip-hop, jazz, disco, reggae, ambient music, folk music, post-punk, EDM, and new age music.

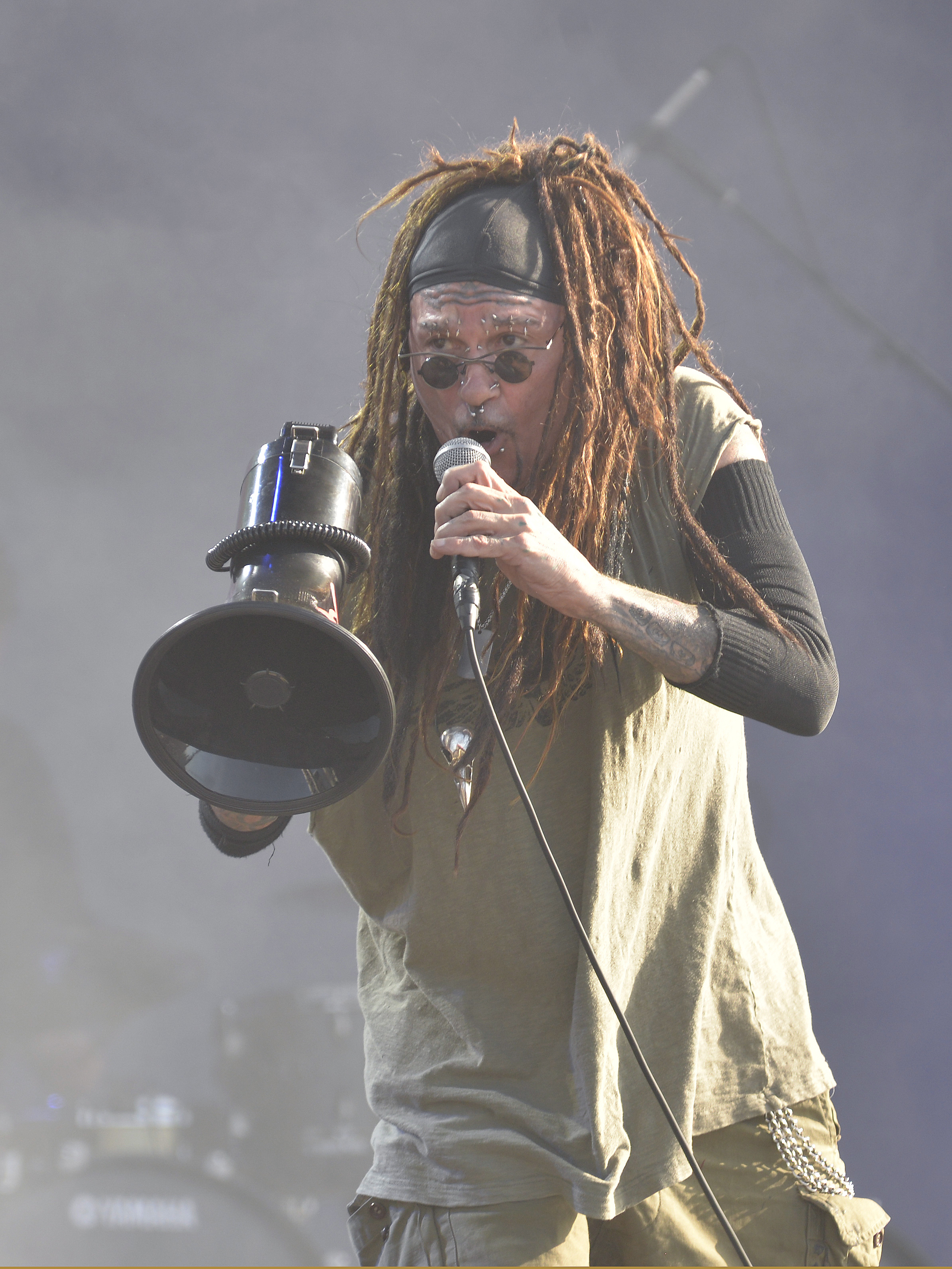
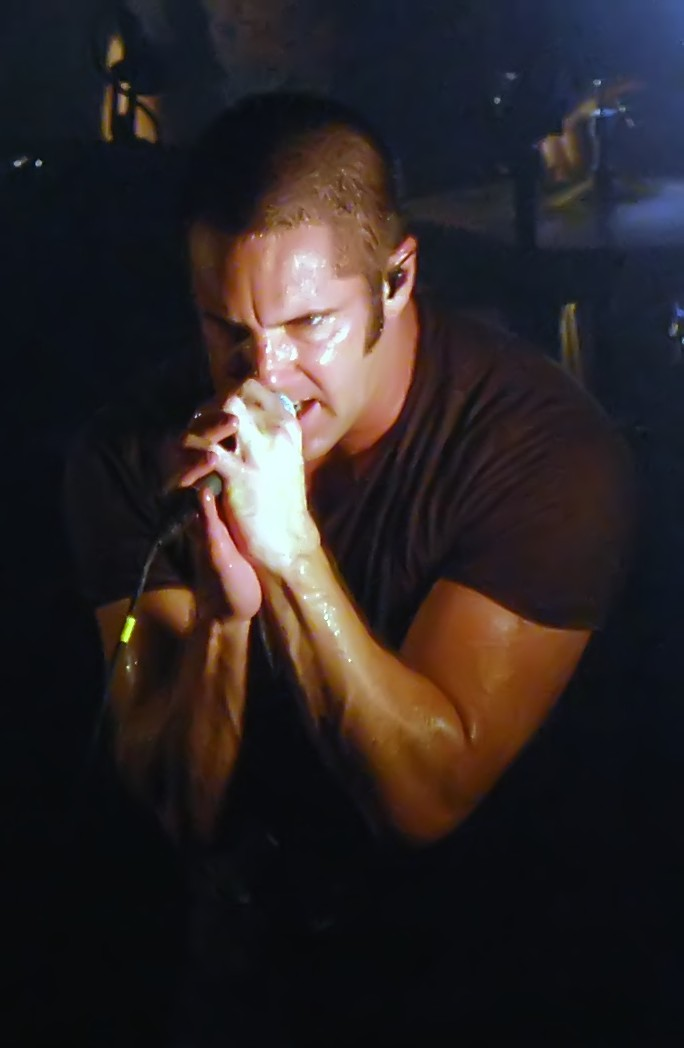
Ministry's Al Jourgensen and Nine Inch Nails' Trent Reznor

Chicago record label Wax Trax! Records was prominent in the widespread attention industrial music later received. The label was started by Jim Nash and Dannie Flesher, and became a central hub for the emerging industrial rock genre during the late 1980s to early 1990s. Wax Trax! released albums by artists such as Front 242, Front Line Assembly, KMFDM, and Sister Machine Gun. Subsequent post-industrial styles included dark ambient, power electronics, power noise, Japanoise, industrial rock, neofolk, electro-industrial, EBM, industrial hip-hop, industrial metal, industrial pop, martial industrial, and futurepop.

=== 1990s–2000s ===
==== Mainstream success ====
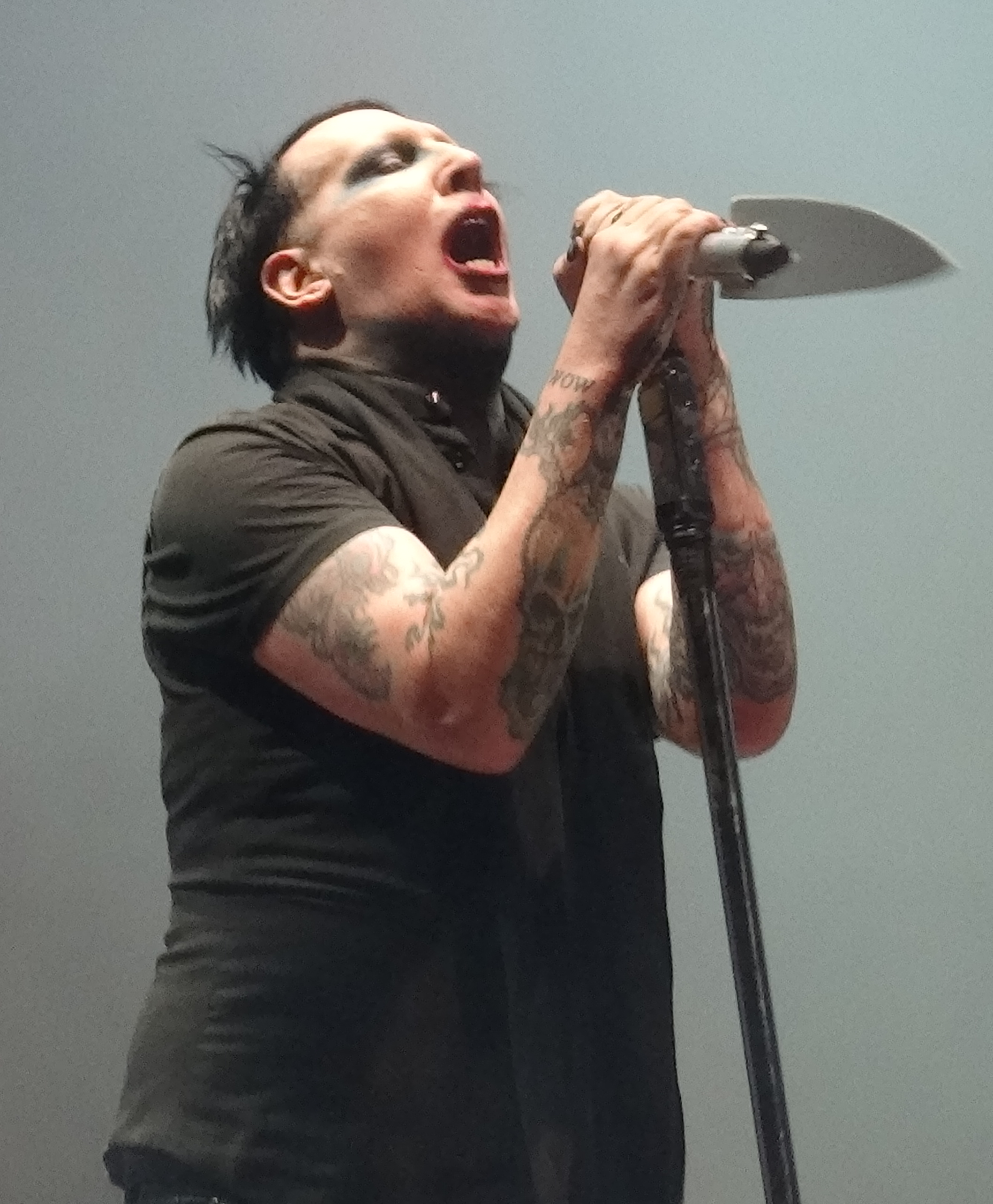
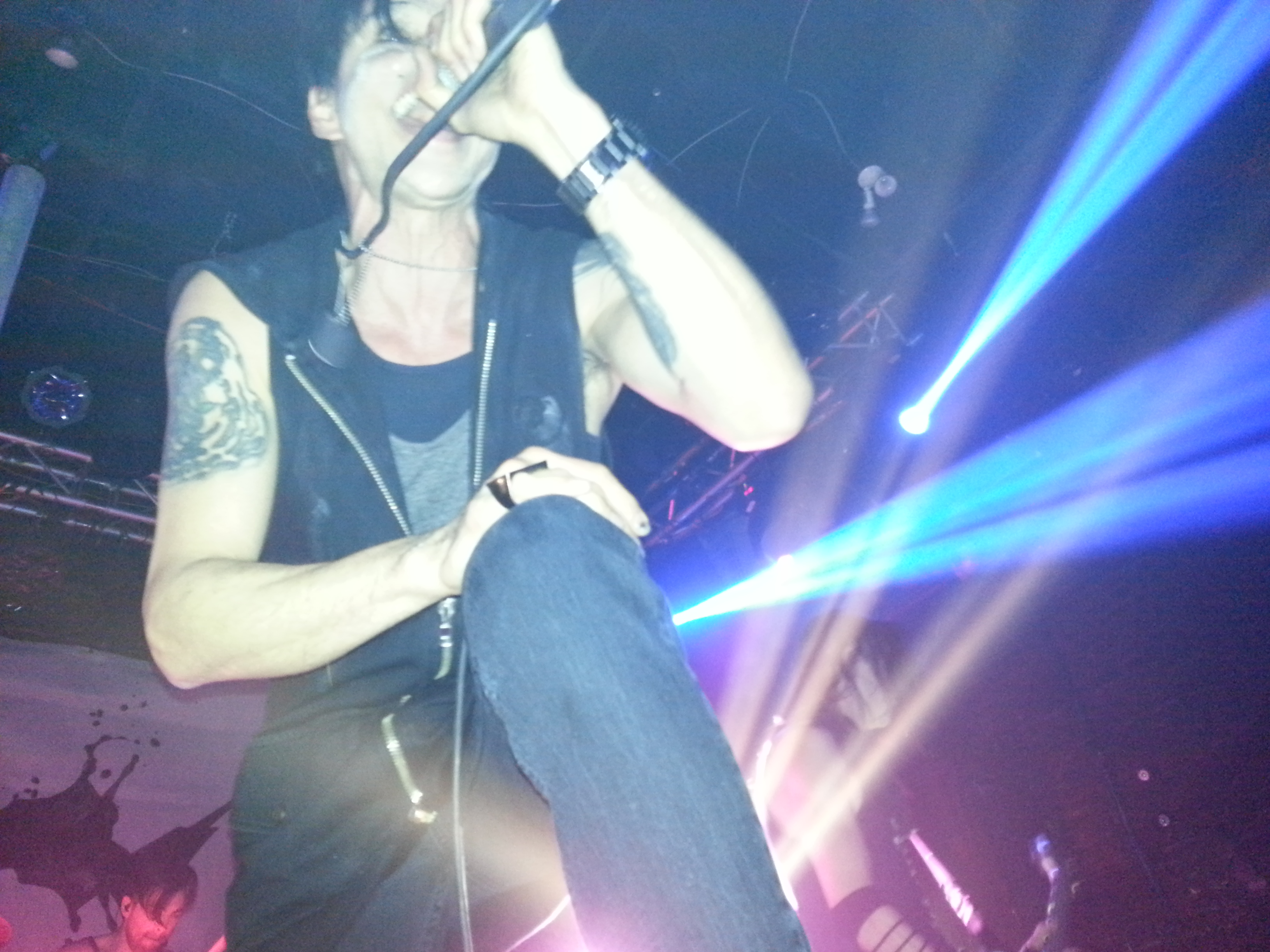
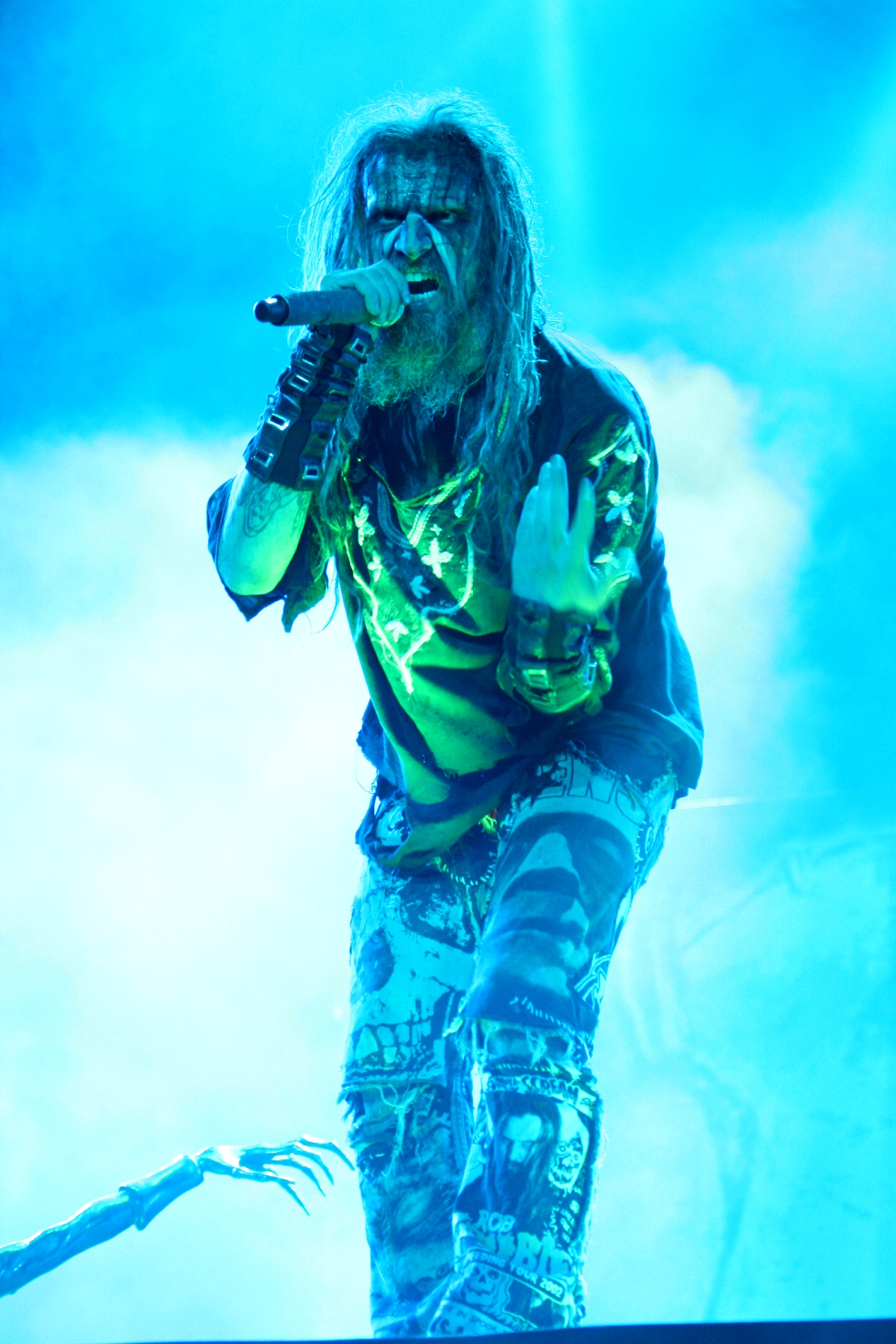
Marilyn Manson and his band, and Rob Zombie prominently used elements associated with industrial music in their albums.

In the 1990s, industrial music broke into the mainstream. The genre, previously ignored or criticized by music journalists, grew popular with disaffected middle-class youth in suburban and rural areas. By this time, the genre had become broad enough that journalist James Greer called it "the kind of meaningless catch-all term that new wave once was". A number of acts associated with industrial music achieved commercial success during this period including Nine Inch Nails, Marilyn Manson, Rammstein and Orgy.

Through the 1990s, Nine Inch Nails and Marilyn Manson had several albums and EPs certified platinum by the Recording Industry Association of America (RIAA), including Nine Inch Nails' Broken (1992), The Downward Spiral (1994) and The Fragile (1999), and Marilyn Manson's Antichrist Superstar (1996) and Mechanical Animals (1998).

== Related genres ==
=== Post-industrial ===
Post-industrial
- Stylistic origins: Industrial; post-punk; new wave; pop; heavy metal; new-age; hip-hop; ambient; folk; EDM; funk; jazz; disco; reggae; rock
- Cultural origins: 1980s; United Kingdom and United States
- Derivative forms: Neofolk; futurepop; Neue Deutsche Härte; new beat; hard beat; witch house; deconstructed club

Subgenres
- Dark ambient; power noise; electro-industrial; EBM; martial industrial; dark electro; aggrotech; cyber metal; isolationism; techstep; neurofunk

Fusion genres
- Industrial rock; industrial hip-hop; industrial metal; industrial pop; industrial dance; industrial techno

Other topics
- Japanoise; harsh noise; harsh noise wall

Post-industrial is a subgenre and era of industrial music that originally emerged in the early 1980s, as a catch-all for several industrial music inspired styles, subgenres and fusions that followed the disbanding of Throbbing Gristle. While the original industrial sound was rooted in avant-garde and experimental music, post-industrial offered more accessible, commercial and diverse offshoots, with the incorporation of traditional pop songwriting, and influences from a variety of genres, which later led to the mainstreaming of several popular acts during the 1990s. Artists incorporated influences from new wave, rock, pop, heavy metal, hip-hop, jazz, funk, disco, reggae, ambient music, folk music, post-punk, EDM, and new-age music.

Chicago record label Wax Trax! Records was prominent in the widespread attention industrial music later received. The label was started by Jim Nash and Dannie Flesher, and became a central hub for the emerging industrial rock genre during the late 1980s to early 1990s. Wax Trax! released albums by artists such as Front 242, Front Line Assembly, KMFDM, and Sister Machine Gun. Another prominent label was Canada's Nettwerk which signed Skinny Puppy. Notable post-industrial styles included dark ambient, power noise, industrial rock, neofolk, electro-industrial, EBM, industrial hip-hop, industrial metal, industrial pop, new beat, martial industrial, and futurepop.

=== Power electronics ===
Power electronics was originally coined by William Bennett of British noise act Whitehouse. It consists of static, screeching waves of feedback, analogue synthesizers making sub-bass pulses or high frequency squealing sounds, and screamed, distorted, often hateful and offensive lyrics. Deeply atonal, there are no conventional melodies or rhythms. Death industrial is a subgenre of power electronics associated with groups such as The Grey Wolves, but the term first referred to artists such as Brighter Death Now. The Swedish label Cold Meat Industry issued the releases in this subgenre.

== See also ==
- Assimilate: A Critical History of Industrial Music
- Cassette culture
- Rivethead
- List of industrial music festivals
- List of industrial music bands
- List of industrial music genres
- Nazi chic
