= Dark ambient =

Electronic music genre

- Other names: Ambient industrial
- Stylistic origins: Ambient; post-industrial; drone; noise
- Cultural origins: Mid-1980s, Europe
- Derivative forms: Dungeon synth; neofolk

Subgenres
- Black ambient; isolationist ambient; ritual ambient; tribal ambient

Fusion genres
- Ambient black metal; martial industrial; funeral doom

Other topics
- Death industrial; dungeon synth; illbient; neurofunk; list of dark ambient artists; list of electronic music genres

Dark ambient (originally known as ambient industrial) is a subgenre of ambient and post-industrial music, that originally emerged in the mid-1980s. It is characterized by ominous, dark drones, discordant overtones and a gloomy, monumental or catacomb-inspired atmosphere. Although mostly an electronic genre, artists frequently sample traditional instruments and make use of semi-acoustic recording procedures.

== Characteristics ==
Dark ambient often consists of evolving dissonant harmonies of drones and resonances, low frequency rumbles and machine noises, sometimes supplemented by gongs, percussive rhythms, bullroarers, distorted voices and other found sounds, often processed to the point where the original sample cannot be recognized. For example, entire works may be based on radio telescope recordings (e.g. Arecibo's Trans-Plutonian Transmissions), the babbling of newborn babies (e.g. Nocturnal Emissions' Mouths of Babes), or sounds recorded through contact microphones on telegraph wires (e.g. Alan Lamb's Primal Image).

Example of dark ambient music, inspired by Blade Runner – Vastopia (see more examples)

Generally, the music tends to evoke a feeling of solitude, melancholy, confinement, darkness, and isolation. Ishkur's Guide to Electronic Music says dark ambient often evokes, "End of days, end of civilizations, feelings of intense isolationism in spite of a socially flattening society." However, while the theme in the music tends to be "dark" in nature, some artists create more organic soundscapes. The Symphonies of the Planets series, a collection of works by Brain/Mind Research inspired by audible-frequency plasma waves recorded by the Voyager uncrewed space probes, can also be considered an organic manifestation of dark ambient.

== Etymology ==
The term dark ambient was coined in the early 1990s by Roger Karmanik to describe the music of Raison d'être and related artists that are heavily associated with the Cold Meat Industry record label.

== Origins and development ==
Dark ambient has its roots in the 1970s with the introduction of newer, smaller, and more affordable effects units, synthesizer and sampling technology. Early genre elements can be found on Throbbing Gristle's 1978 album D.o.A: The Third and Final Report of Throbbing Gristle, and in the soundtrack to the 1977 David Lynch film Eraserhead. Important early precursors of the genre were Tangerine Dream's early double-album Zeit (1972), which unlike most of their subsequent albums abandoned any notion of rhythm or definable melody in favour of "darkly" sinuous, occasionally disturbing sonics; and also, Affenstunde (1970) by fellow krautrock band Popol Vuh.

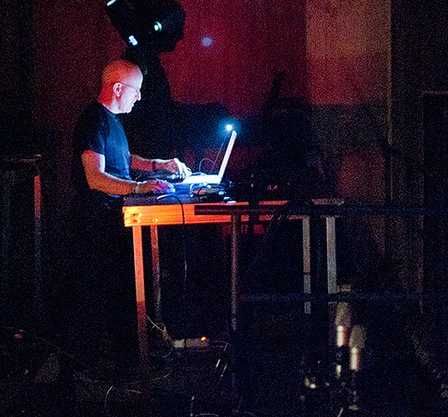
Lustmord

Projects like Lustmord, Nocturnal Emissions, Lab Report, and Zoviet France evolved out of industrial music during the 1980s, and were some of the earliest artists to create consistently dark ambient music. These artists make use of industrial principles such as noise and shock tactics, but wield these elements with more subtlety. Additionally, ambient industrial often has strong occultist tendencies with a particular leaning toward magick as expounded by Aleister Crowley, and chaos magic, often giving the music a ritualistic flavor.

The album Deep Listening by pioneering electronic and experimental composer Pauline Oliveros in collaboration with Stuart Dempster and Panaiotis released in 1989 as well as the album Zamia Lehmanni: Songs of Byzantine Flowers by Australian musical group SPK released in 1987 are also cited as having made a considerable impact on the development of dark ambient.

In the 2020s, artists known for producing dark ambient work include acts associated with the Cryo Chamber record label, run by Simon Heath who has been composing dark ambient music for over two decades, and Cyclic Law from France. The website "This Is Darkness" is devoted to the dark ambient genre in all its iterations.

== Subgenres ==
=== Isolationism ===
Isolationism
- Other names: Isolationist ambient
- Stylistic origins: Dark ambient
- Cultural origins: Early 1990s, Europe

Other topics
- Ambient music; Japanoise

Isolationism (also known as isolationist ambient) is a subgenre of dark ambient that was prominent in the 1990s. The term was coined by British musician Kevin Martin and first appeared in print in a September 1993 issue of The Wire magazine. He described it as a form of fractured, subdued music that "pushed away" listeners rather than comforting them. In 1994 Martin curated a compilation album, Isolationism, collecting various examples of the genre. Journalist David Segal referred to it as "ambient's sinister, antisocial cousin".

John Everall, owner of the Sentrax label, placed the origins of "Isolationist" music in early industrial groups, krautrock, ambient music and experimental composers such John Cage and Karlheinz Stockhausen, and others. James Plotkin identified Brian Eno's ambient works as an influence on the isolationist scene, along with American experimental bands such as Illusion of Safety. As Plotkin says,

I really didn't know what was meant by Isolationism [...], because it encompassed this broad spectrum of music that ranged from Ambient to avant garde music to even something more aggressive – like the Japanese Noise scene. [...] Isolationism was a Virgin compilation and it needed a marketing angle. And [compiler] Kevin Martin was definitely responsible for exposing a really large amount of people to music that would otherwise have gone unnoticed, so I guess it's not all bad.

== See also ==
- List of dark ambient artists
- List of electronic music genres
