= Ordo Equitum Solis =

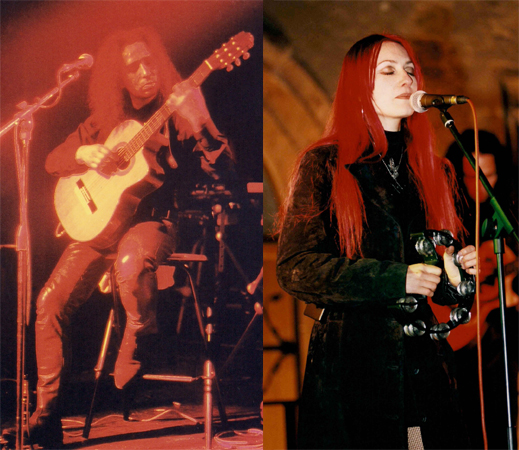
- OES live

Background information
- Also known as: OES
- Origin: France, Italy
- Genres: Dark wave, neofolk, dark ambient, neoclassical dark wave
- Years active: 1988–2001 (Reunion in 2010)
- Labels: MMM, Sinope
- Website: ordoequitumsolis.com

Ordo Equitum Solis (abbreviated OES) are an alternative music band consisting of French Leithana, pseudonym of Nathalie Herrera (vocals, keyboards, zither, percussions) and Italian Deraclamo, pseudonym of Paolo De Marco (vocals, guitar). The duo formed in 1988, and released albums and toured between 1990 and 2000. In 2001 the band suddenly broke up, but there was a reunion in 2010.

The musical style of OES does not fall into a precise category. While the early albums have pronounced industrial, esoteric darkwave and a touch of medieval influences, with time their musical style matured, embracing multi-faceted sonorities between neofolk, experimentalism and ballad songs. The albums, that include also instrumental tracks, are characterized by a significant switch and mix of genres, making Ordo Equitum Solis' music unusual, various, intimistic and hard to describe. Distinguishing features are Leithana's voice, Deraclamo's folk guitar, lyrics in various languages (English, French, Latin, Italian), highly-emotional melodies, experimental effects, romantic and decadent atmosphere, and remarkable, sometimes provocative arrangements.

Ordo Equitum Solis' releases had often been concept-albums, inspired by symbolic themes or personal experiences. The albums denote also the duality of the band, between Leithana's often inflexible creative genius, and Deraclamo's instinctive inspiration.

== History ==
=== Formation ===
Leithana and Deraclamo met in 1985 in a post-punk club in Paris (Le Saint), the city where Leithana lived. Deraclamo at that time roamed around London, Paris and Barcelona. They immediately decided to make music together, considering their love for music and the coincidence of their musical taste, especially regarding the dark and post-punk London scene. In addition, both had the same sense of freedom, that would induce a continuous wandering in the following years, a theme developed in their CD Planetes.

To realize their musical project, in 1987 both moved to Paganotti, a mountain village in Italy, where they made their first album Solstitii Temporis Sensus. Between 1988 and 1989 Ordo Equitum Solis befriended Tony Wakeford (Sol Invictus), who played on the first two albums of Ordo Equitum Solis. In 1992 Leithana recorded some piano tracks for Sol Invictus. As keyboard-player Leithana also participated in some of Sol Invictus' concerts, in particular during the legendary tour of Death In June, Current 93 and Sol Invictus together (1991).

=== 1990–1997 ===
On 21 December 1990, the band's first album, Solstitii Temporis Sensus was released on the independent label Musica Maxima Magnetica (already label of Sleep Chamber, Vasilisk and numerous other artists). The album had an immediate and unexpected success both in terms of sales and in terms of audience. The cooperation with the label would continue until 1996 with the albums Animi Aegritudo (1992), the mini-CD OES (1993), the live-album Paraskénia (1994), and finally Hecate (1995).

The period is characterized by an artistic growth of the music, as well as an increasing popularity especially among gothic and neofolk listeners. Many articles about and interviews with the band appeared in magazines and fanzines. The band played many concerts in Europe, and also did a tour in the US and Russia in 1993. Ordo Equitum Solis released Hecate in 1995, which was innovative and astonishing, and very different from the music scene's standard of the moment.

From 1995 on there were disagreements between Ordo Equitum Solis and the label Musica Maxima Magnetica, because the distributor Audioglobe interfered more with the band's affairs. The recording sessions of their following album Planetes started in 1996, but weren't completed until 1998. That same year the band managed to get back all rights regarding Ordo Equitum Solis’ past and future works, and therefore to be fully operational again, after a forced three year stop.

=== 1998–2001 ===
Planetes was released in January 1999 on Ordo Equitum Solis' own label Sinope, through the UK-based World Serpent Distribution. In addition to Planetes, the band's revival resulted in the release of the mini-album Signs, the double CD compilation Octo, the album Metamorphosis - Personam Impono and the 7 inch vinyl picture-disc A Divine Image. During this period the artistic experimentations of the band kept evolving, with a more refined style detached from clichés. A review of Planetes stated: "Planetes, with its delicate electro-acoustic ballads and its subtle 'esoteric' keyboard layers, places itself more than worthily in a creative path still in solitary and noteworthy ascent" (Vittore Baroni, Rumore, n° 85 – 1999). Planetes and the other CD's of this year were reviewed in various international magazines.

Nevertheless, the non-efficient distribution of World Serpent disappointed the band. The general drop in sales faced the band with excessive difficulties. Also, Ordo Equitum Solis found that live-concerts were harder to get or unsatisfying, and the band finally decided to break up, immediately after their concert at the Wave-Gotik-Treffen in Leipzig on 3 June 2001.

Notwithstanding the band's break-up, Leithana and Deraclamo would still continue working on unreleased tracks composed in 1989–90, with the intention of releasing a "posthumous" album. Apart from this, Leithana started working on an solo-album, which she ultimately decided to never publish. In 2002, all musical projects of the band were put on hold.

=== Since 2010 ===
In November 2010 an announcement on the band's official website reported the reunion of Ordo Equitum Solis, as well as the release of a brand new album.

== Influences and music ==
Ordo Equitum Solis is influenced by the gothic and post-punk London music scene of the 1980s, particularly by bands like Joy Division, SPK, Cocteau Twins, Bauhaus, Dead Can Dance, Clair Obscur, Virgin Prunes, Coil, Sol Invictus and Death In June.

The name of the band, which literally means "The Order of the Knights of the Sun" in Latin, was coined by Deraclamo, and was meant to underline a certain vision of the world, willingly anachronistic yet strong and current in the 1990s. The use of the Latin language as well as the look of the band represent some of the innovations introduced by Ordo Equitum Solis, which would be extensively reused in the gothic and alternative music scene. Ordo Equitum Solis is characterized by implicit symbolic and magical themes and more explicit themes of gnosticism, a love of nature and the conceptual union with the elements.

== Discography ==
=== Albums ===
- Solstitii Temporis Sensus (1990)
- Animi Aegritudo (1991)
- Paraskénia (1994)
- Hecate (1995)
- Planets (1999)
- Metamorphosis - Personam Impono (2000)
- Killing Time Killing Love (2013)

=== Mini-CD's ===
- OES (1993)
- Signs (1999)

=== Singles ===
- "A Divine Image" (2000)

=== Compilations ===
- Octo (1999)

=== Video ===
- "In Russia"
