= Sol Veritas Lux =

Studio album by Sol Invictus
- Released: 1990; 2006
- Genre: Neofolk; neoclassical
- Label: Tursa; Strange Fortune

Sol Veritas Lux is an album by the English neofolk band Sol Invictus. It combines the first Sol Invictus release, the mini-LP Against the Modern World, with the second release, the live album In the Jaws of the Serpent, onto one CD.

The music of this release is dark, rough, and primitive, and counts among the earliest efforts of the post-industrial neofolk music scene. It is one of Sol Invictus releases where Tony Wakeford shares lead vocals with Ian Read, who went on to Fire + Ice.

It was originally released in 1990. In 2006, it was remastered for a re-release with extra tracks showing a current interpretation on the same material.

== Track listing (1990 release) ==
Against the Modern World

1. "Angels Fall"
2. "Raven Chorus"
3. "Against The Modern World"
4. "Long Live Death"
5. "A Ship is Burning"
6. "Untitled"
7. "Summer Ends"
8. "Wolf Age, Axe Age"

In the Jaws of the Serpent

1. "Angels Fall" (2)
2. "Rise and Fall"
3. "The World Turns"
4. "The Runes"
5. "Gold is King"
6. "TWA Corbies"
7. "Somewhere in Europe"
8. "Media"
9. "Abattoirs of Love"
10. "Raven Chorus" (2)
11. "The Joy of the World"

== Personnel ==
- Tony Wakeford — Guitars, bass, keyboards, drums, vocals
- Ian Read — Keyboards, vocals
- Liz Gray — Violin, backing vocals, piano
- Karl Blake — Bass
