= Dark Adapted Eye =

Compilation album by Danielle Dax
- Released: November 1988
- Recorded: Fortress Dax Spring 1987
- Genre: Art rock
- Label: Sire Records
- Producer: Danielle Dax

Danielle Dax chronology
The Janice Long Session EP (1988)	Dark Adapted Eye (1988)	Blast The Human Flower (1990)

Singles from Dark Adapted Eye
- 1. "Cat-House" Released: April 1988 (U.K.) / February 1989 (U.S.); 2. "White Knuckle Ride" Released: 3 April 1989 (U.K.)

Dark Adapted Eye is a compilation album by Danielle Dax, an English experimental musician, formerly of The Lemon Kittens. Released in 1988 on Sire Records on LP, cassette and CD, it consisted of material from albums and singles released on her own label, Awesome Records, and was the first release of her material in North America.

Cover artwork is by Holly Warburton.

== Background ==
Dark Adapted Eye was Dax's debut album release in North America, and contains all songs from her 1987 album Inky Bloaters except "Born to Be Bad". The compilation also includes the standalone U.K. single "Cat-House", remixed versions of three B-sides "When I Was Young", "Whistling for His Love" and "Touch Piggy's Eyes", another B-side "House-Cat", and a previously unreleased song titled "White Knuckle Ride", which was later released as a single in the United Kingdom in April 1989.

After being out of print for years, the CD was reissued in the U.S. by the Noble Rot label in 2008. In 2019, the U.S. label Rubellan Remasters remastered the album and reissued it on CD with several bonus tracks different from the original release.

== Track listing ==
All lyrics are written by Danielle Dax; all music is composed by Danielle Dax and David Knight except where noted.

Dark Adapted Eye track listing
No.	Title	Writer(s)	Original album or single	Length
1.	"Cat-House" (Single version)		The Chemical Wedding	3:30
2.	"Big Hollow Man" (Remix/Single version)		Inky Bloaters	4:48
3.	"White Knuckle Ride"		Previously unreleased	2:54
4.	"When I Was Young" (U.S. Mix)	Danielle Dax (Lyrics); Steve Reeves (Music)	B-side of "Where the Flies Are"	3:49
5.	"Yummer-Yummer Man"		Inky Bloaters	3:25
6.	"Fizzing Human Bomb"		Inky Bloaters	3:44
7.	"Whistling for His Love" (U.S. Mix)		The Chemical Wedding	3:29
8.	"Flashback"		Inky Bloaters	4:20
9.	"Inky Bloaters"		Inky Bloaters	3:29
10.	"Brimstone in a Barren Land"		Inky Bloaters	4:28
11.	"Bad Miss 'M'"		Inky Bloaters	2:44
12.	"Touch Piggy's Eyes" (U.S. Mix)		The Chemical Wedding	4:05
Total length:				44:49

Bonus tracks on all CD and Cassette pressings (except 2019 CD issue)
No.	Title	Writer(s)	Original album or single	Length
13.	"House-Cat"		B-side of "Cat-House" (U.K. single)	3:31
14.	"Bed Caves"	Danielle Dax	Pop-Eyes	3:14
15.	"Sleep Has No Property"		Inky Bloaters	4:31
16.	"Hammerheads"	Danielle Dax	Jesus Egg That Wept	3:15
17.	"Pariah"	Danielle Dax	Jesus Egg That Wept	3:46
18.	"Where the Flies Are"	Danielle Dax (Lyrics and Music); David Knight (Music); Steve Reeves (Music)	Inky Bloaters	3:15
19.	"Funtime"		Inky Bloaters	3:22
Total length:				1:09:43

Rubellan Remasters CD Bonus Tracks (2019)
No.	Title	Writer(s)	Original album or single	Length
13.	"Sleep Has No Property"		Inky Bloaters	4:31
14.	"Where the Flies Are"	Danielle Dax (Lyrics and Music); David Knight (Music); Steve Reeves (Music)	Inky Bloaters	3:15
15.	"Funtime"		Inky Bloaters	3:22
16.	"Cold Sweat"		B-side of "White Knuckle Ride" (U.K.) and "Cat-House" 12" single (U.S.)	6:01
17.	"Cat-House" (Overnight Mix)		"Cat-House" 12" single (U.S.)	5:00
18.	"White Knuckle Ride" (Remix/Single version)		"White Knuckle Ride" single (U.K.) and "Cat-House" 12" single (U.S.)	2:50
19.	"Whistling for His Love" (12" Remix)		"Whistling for His Love" 12" promo single (U.S.)	6:15
Total length:				1:16:06

== Singles ==
=== White Knuckle Ride ===
U.K. 7" (3 April 1989) – Awesome Records AO23

1. "White Knuckle Ride" (Remix) – 2:47
2. "Whistling for His Love" (7" Remix) – 3:19

U.K. 12" (3 April 1989) – Awesome Records AO23T

1. "White Knuckle Ride" (Remix) – 2:47
2. "Whistling for His Love" (7" Remix) – 3:19
3. "Cold Sweat" (U.K. Edit) – 5:41

== Promotional Singles ==
=== Whistling for His Love ===
U.S. 12" Promo (1989) – Sire PRO–A–3630

1. "Whistling for His Love" (12" Remix) – 6:14
2. "Whistling for His Love" (Bonus Beat Dub) – 4:04
3. "Whistling for His Love" (7" Remix) – 3:19
4. "Whistling for His Love" (Vocal Dub) – 4:03

== Release history ==
Country	Date	Label	Format	Cat. No.	Ref.
United States	November 1988	Sire	LP; Cassette; CD	9 25818-1; 4-25818; 9 25818-2	
Germany	16 May 1989	Rough Trade	LP	RTD 112	
United States	8 September 2008	Noble Rot	CD	NOT5018	
Japan	27 July 2012 (Cancelled)	Hayabusa Landings	CD (Mini-LP replica sleeve)	HYCA-2060	
United States	22 May 2019	Rubellan Remasters	CD	RUBY07CD	
United States	28 August 2023	Rubellan Remasters	LP (Gold & White Marbled vinyl); LP (Yellow Translucent vinyl)	RUBY47LP	
