= Inky Bloaters =

Studio album by Danielle Dax
- Released: 1 April 1987 (Japan); 8 June 1987 (United Kingdom)
- Recorded: 1985–1987
- Studios: Fortress Dax, Alvic, Alaska & Greenhouse Studios
- Genres: Avant-pop; pop rock; indie rock; alternative
- Label: Awesome Records
- Producer: Danielle Dax

Danielle Dax chronology
Jesus Egg That Wept (1984)	Inky Bloaters (1987)	The Chemical Wedding (1987)

Singles from Inky Bloaters
- 1. "Yummer-Yummer Man" Released: 28 October 1985; 2. "Where the Flies Are" Released: 6 October 1986; 3. "Big Hollow Man" Released: 20 July 1987

Inky Bloaters is the third solo album by Danielle Dax, an English experimental musician and former member of the Lemon Kittens. It was originally recorded between 1985 & 1987, and released in 1987 on the Awesome Records label. This was the last album by Dax released on the Awesome label before signing with Sire. The album was re-released in 1993 on the Biter of Thorpe label (BOT131-04CD) and distributed through World Serpent Distribution.

Dax wrote all the lyrics for the album and shared music writing and arrangement with David Knight. Dax provided vocals, guitars, keyboards, flute, sitar, kalimba, percussion and drone guitar. David Knight played guitars, tapes, keyboards, percussion and drone guitar. Ian Sturgess played additional bass, harmonica, jaw harp and percussion. Stevie Savage played guitar and composed music for When I Was Young. Martyn Watts played drums. The cover artwork is by Dax.

== Track listing ==
All lyrics are written by Danielle Dax; all music is composed by Danielle Dax and David Knight.

No.	Title	Length
1.	"Flashback"	4:23
2.	"Funtime"	3:28
3.	"Inky Bloaters"	3:32
4.	"Sleep Has No Property"	4:32
5.	"Bad Miss 'M'"	2:47
6.	"Big Hollow Man"	5:20
7.	"Brimstone in a Barren Land"	4:33
8.	"Where the Flies Are"	3:20
9.	"Born to Be Bad"	2:58
10.	"Fizzing Human-Bomb"	3:45
11.	"Yummer-Yummer Man" (CD Bonus Track)	3:25

All tracks except "Born to Be Bad" appear on the 1988 US compilation Dark Adapted Eye. Tracks 5–6, 8 and 10-11 appear on the 1995 UK compilation Comatose-Non-Reaction. A different recording of "Fizzing Human-Bomb" was released on The Janice Long Session EP.

== Reception ==
=== Album ===
Professional ratings
Review scores
Source	Rating
AllMusic	3/5 stars

On its initial release the album reviewed by Music Week, who described it as "nearly unique", and noted that it "combines elements as diverse as Bo Diddley, Bolan pop and the musak of Indian cinema", through the use of varied instruments "from the sitar to the kalima" and "lucid lyrics". The album was summarised as containing an "extraordinary mish mash of sounds".

Michael Jourdan of AllMusic gave the album three out of five stars. He noted the album sounded "bigger" and "more commercial" than her previous albums, with traces of "guitar-driven dance-pop" of the 1980s decade. He compared "Flashback" with the work of Blondie and noted "Big Hollow Man" had "[taken] a page from Prince". However, Jourdan felt that the "more conventional arrangements" resulted in an album that had become more dated than her previous work. The songs "Flashback", "Inky Bloaters", "Big Hollow Man", "Brimstone in a Barren Land" and "Where the Flies Are" were highlighted as standouts from the album.

=== Singles ===
The album's first single "Yummer Yummer Man" was positively received by Music Week, who noted it as "amazingly only her first single" and first release since the "critically acclaimed" Jesus Egg That Wept album. The song was described as being "in her usual eclectic style" and was "sure to appeal to the indie market". The B-side "Bad Miss M" received some airplay on BBC Radio 1 in December 1985.

== Singles ==
=== Yummer–Yummer Man (28 October 1985) ===
U.K. 7" – Awesome Records AOR 3

1. "Yummer–Yummer Man" – 3:25
2. "Bad Miss 'M'" – 2:47

U.K. 12" – Awesome Records AOR 3T

1. "Fizzing Human Bomb" – 3:45
2. "Yummer–Yummer Man" – 3:25
3. "Bad Miss 'M'" – 2:47

=== Where the Flies Are (6 October 1986) ===
U.K. 7" – Awesome Records AOR 6

1. "Where the Flies Are" (Edit) – 2:57
2. "When I Was Young" – 3:55

U.K. 12" – Awesome Records AOR 6T

1. "Where the Flies Are" – 3:20
2. "Up in Arms" – 3:01
3. "When I Was Young" – 3:55

=== Big Hollow Man (20 July 1987) ===
U.K. 7" – Awesome Records AOR 10

1. "Big Hollow Man" (Remix) – 5:02
2. "Muzzles" – 3:22

U.K. 12" – Awesome Records AOR 10T

1. "Big Hollow Man" (Remix) – 5:02
2. "Muzzles" – 3:22
3. "The Passing of the Third Floor Back" – 1:55

== Promotional Singles ==
=== Inky Bloaters (April 1987) ===
Japan 7" Promo – VAP PR–110

1. "Inky Bloaters" – 3:32
2. "Yummer–Yummer Man" – 3:25

== Charts ==
Inky Bloaters

Chart (1987)	Peak position
UK Indie Chart (MRIB)	9
UK Indie Chart (Music Week)	16

"Yummer Yummer Man"

Chart (1985)	Peak position
UK Indie Chart (MRIB)	7
UK Indie Chart (Music Week)	24

"Where the Flies Are"

Chart (1986)	Peak position
UK Indie Chart (MRIB)	14
UK Indie Chart (Music Week)	40

"Big Hollow Man"

Chart (1987)	Peak position
UK Indie Chart (MRIB)	4
UK Indie Chart (Music Week)	16

== Release history ==
Country	Date	Format	Label	Cat. No.	Ref.
Japan	1 April 1987	LP; CD	VAP	35182-25; 85011-32	
United Kingdom	8 June 1987	LP; Cassette; CD	Awesome Records	AOR 13; AOR 13CS; AOR 13CD	
Germany	1987	LP	Rough Trade	RTD 49	
Scandinavia	1987	LP	Mega Records	MRLP 3088	
United Kingdom	1993	CD	Biter of Thorpe	bot 131-04 CD	
Japan	25 July 2012 (Cancelled)	CD (Mini-LP replica sleeve)	Hayabusa Landings	HYCA-2059	
