= Jesus Egg That Wept =

Studio album by Danielle Dax
- Released: 12 November 1984
- Recorded: Fortress Dax & IPS Studio
- Genre: Art rock
- Label: Awesome Records
- Producer: Danielle Dax

Danielle Dax chronology
Pop-Eyes (1983)	Jesus Egg That Wept (1984)	Inky Bloaters (1987)

Jesus Egg That Wept is the second solo album by Danielle Dax, an English experimental musician and former member of the Lemon Kittens. It was originally recorded and released in November 1984 on the Awesome Records label.

== Background ==
The album's title was taken from a headline in a tabloid newspaper.

Dax wrote and produced all the songs on the album as well as playing the guitar, honky-tonk piano, drums, bass, flute, keyboards, tenor saxophone, tapes, TR-808, synths, metal kalimba and providing the vocals. Additional instruments were played by David Knight on "Evil-Honky Stomp" and "Fortune Cheats"; Karl Blake, another former member of the Lemon Kittens, provided additional sounds on "Ostrich". Cover artwork was again created by Holly Warburton. Warburton's artwork can be found on most of Dax's early work.

The album originally contained the song "Here Come the Harvest Buns", which had previously appeared on her debut LP Pop-Eyes. The song was removed from the track list when the album was issued on CD for the first time in 1993.

The album was re-released in 1993 on the Biter Of Thorpe label (BOT131-02CD) and distributed through World Serpent Distribution.

== Reception ==
Professional ratings
Review scores
Source	Rating
AllMusic	4/5 stars

In a review for AllMusic, Michael Jourdan rated the album 4 out of 5 stars, noting that the album's "arrangements are spare but effective" like on Dax's previous album Pop-Eyes and compared her vocals at points to Kate Bush and Elvis Presley. He called "Evil Honky Stomp" Dax's "best song to date".

== Track listing ==
All tracks are written by Danielle Dax.

No.	Title	Length
1.	"Evil-Honky Stomp"	4:42
2.	"Pariah"	3:46
3.	"Fortune Cheats"	4:35
4.	"Hammerheads"	3:36
5.	"Here Come the Harvest Buns" (Not included on the 1993 CD reissue)	3:04
6.	"Ostrich"	4:01
7.	"The Spoil Factor"	4:00

2012 Japanese CD Bonus Tracks (from the Timber Tongue EP, originally released in 1995) – HYCA-2058
No.	Title	Length
8.	"Toygit"	3:52
9.	"E.V.I.L. T."	2:24
10.	"Timber Tongue"	5:22
11.	"Uru Eu Wau Wau"	6:57

== Charts ==
Chart (1984)	Peak position
UK Indie Chart (MRIB)	10

== Release history ==
Country	Date	Format	Label	Cat. No.	Ref.
United Kingdom	12 November 1984	LP	Awesome Records	AOR 01	
United Kingdom	1993	CD	Biter of Thorpe	BOT 131-02 CD	
Japan	27 June 2012	CD (Mini-LP replica sleeve)	Hayabusa Landings	HYCA-2058	
