= Crisis (punk band) =

British punk rock band

Background information
- Origin: Guildford, Surrey, England, UK
- Genres: Punk rock; anarcho-punk; post-punk; gothic rock
- Years active: 1977–1980, 2017–present
- Labels: Action Group Records, Ardkor
- Spinoffs: Death in June; Above the Ruins; Sol Invictus; Carcrash International
- Members: Tony Wakeford; Clive Giblin; Lloyd James; Aurora Lee
- Past members: Douglas Pearce; Lester Jones; Phrazer; Insect Robin the Cleaner; Dexter; Luke Rendle; Igor Olejar

Crisis are an English punk rock band formed in 1977 in Guildford, Surrey. An openly left-wing and anti-fascist band, they performed at rallies for Rock Against Racism and the Anti-Nazi League, and at Right to Work marches. British music magazine Sounds used the phrase "Music to March To" to describe their controversial and radical left-wing form of music.

== History ==
=== Formation and career ===
Crisis formed in 1977 with the lineup of Phrazer (vocals), Lester Jones (lead guitar), Douglas Pearce (guitar), Tony Wakeford (bass) and Insect Robin the Cleaner (drums).

Their debut single, "No Town Hall", was released in 1978 on Action Group Records.

On 11 January 1978, Crisis recorded four tracks at a Peel Session for BBC Radio 1, with two of the tracks released as the "UK 79" 7" single in 1979 on the Ardkor label. The remaining two Peel Session songs were posthumously issued by Ardkor in 1981 as "Alienation". Crisis's sound distinguished the band from other punk rock groups, as the band could also easily fit into the post-punk/gothic sound.

In early 1979, the band underwent a major change in personnel when Phrazer and Insect Robin the Cleaner were replaced by Dexter (a longtime fan and roadie) and Luke Rendle. After performing their last show, supporting Magazine and Bauhaus in their hometown of Guildford on 10 May 1980, the band broke up. A recording of the final show was released in 2008 as the Ends! CD.

=== Later projects ===
Pearce and Wakeford went on to form Death in June in 1981. In early 1984, Wakeford was fired from Death in June for "bringing his 'right-wing leanings into the group'"; at the time he had been a member of the National Front (UK). He subsequently formed the National Front-affiliated post-punk band Above the Ruins, but later distanced himself from right-wing views and formed the neofolk band Sol Invictus. Rendle joined the Straps, then The Pack/Theatre of Hate. Jones formed Carcrash International. In 1985, Jones also performed as a touring member of Andi Sex Gang & the Quick Gas Gang.

=== Legacy ===
The Crisis discography has been compiled on CD twice (as We Are All Jews and Germans double CD in 1997 by World Serpent, and as Holocaust Hymns single CD in 2005 by Apop Records), as well as once on vinyl LP Kollectiv in 2014 by La Vida Es un Mus).

=== Reformation ===
In 2015, Wakeford formed the ensemble 1.9.8.4., to perform the songs he had written for both Crisis and Death in June. In 2017, 1.9.8.4., was renamed Crisis, announcing concerts in the UK and Europe in 2017 and 2018. The new Crisis line-up consists of original member Wakeford on bass, Lloyd James (of Naevus) on vocals, Clive Giblin (of Alternative TV) on guitar and Igor Olejar (of Autorotation) on drums. In a November 2017 interview with Louder Than War, Wakeford said, "It became increasingly obvious that there was major interest in Crisis and that the band and songs held a special place in people hearts...There is obviously a growing interest in that period, with a lot of bands reforming. Crisis were an important part of that history, and I think the band sound fresh and the songs are still valid, perhaps even more so today". In mid-2018, Aurora Lee replaced Olejar on drums.

== Discography ==
=== Studio albums ===
- Hymns of Faith mini-LP (1980, Ardkor)

=== Singles and EPs ===
- "No Town Hall" 7" single (1978, Action Group Records)
- "UK 79" 7" single (1979, Ardkor)
- "Alienation" 7" single (1981, Ardkor)
- Holocaust - U.K. 12" EP (1982, Action Group Records/Ardkor)
- "The Hammer and the Anvil" 7" single (2019, Relaxomatic Vibrator Records)
- Escalator 12" EP (2020, Wooden Lung)

=== Live albums ===
- Ends! (2008, Neroz)
- Paris '18 (2018, self-released)

=== Compilation albums ===
- We Are All Jews and Germans (1997, World Serpent)
- Holocaust Hymns (2005, Apop Records)
- Kollectiv (2014, La Vida Es un Mus)
