= Cat House =

A cat house is a cattery, a place where cats are housed.

Cat house may also refer to:

== Places ==
- Cat House (Riga), a building in Latvia
- The Cat House, a building in Henfield, England
- Cathouse Rock Club, in Glasgow

== Television ==
- "Cat House" (Charmed), a 2003 episode of the television series Charmed
- Cathouse: The Series, a reality television series set in a Nevada brothel, first aired in 2005

== Music ==
- "Cat-House", a song by Danielle Dax

== Other uses ==
- Cat tree, artificial structure furnishing feline exercise, play, and rest
- Cat House radar, Soviet radar system
- Cat house, American slang for a brothel

== See also ==
- Cathouse (disambiguation)
