= The Blade (Sol Invictus album) =

Studio album by Sol Invictus
- Released: 1997

Sol Invictus chronology
In the Rain (1995)	The Blade (1997)	In Europa (1998)

The Blade is the ninth studio album by the English band Sol Invictus, released in 1997. It continues the classical instrumentation established on the band's preceding album, In the Rain (1995), but adds more martial drums and electric guitar. The frontman Tony Wakeford brought in two classically trained musicians, Eric Roger on trumpet and cornet and Matt Howden on violin, with whom he had worked in his other band L'Orchestre Noir.

== Reception ==
Cesare Buttaboni and Marco De Baptistis of Ondarock said the first half of the album is interesting and the second is "gorgeous", highlighting the tracks "The House Above the World", "Laws and Crowns" and "See How We Fall".

== Track listing ==
1. "The Blade"
2. "In Heaven"
3. "Time Flies"
4. "The House Above the World"
5. "Laws And Crown"
6. "Once Upon a Time"
7. "See How We Fall"
8. "Gealdor"
9. "From the Wreckage"
10. "Nothing Here"
11. "Remember and Forget"
12. "The Blade"
