= In the Rain (album) =

Studio album by Sol Invictus
- Released: 1995
- Genre: Neofolk
- Language: English
- Label: Tursa

In the Rain is the eighth studio album by the English band Sol Invictus, released in 1995 by the record label Tursa. On this recording, Sol Invictus wed trumpet, violin and cello to folk arrangements. Lyrically, the album focuses on the fragility of life and the certainty of death.

== Recording and production ==
In the Rain was the first Sol Invictus album to fully incorporate classical instrumentation. It was the last on which the musicians David Mellor and Sarah Bradshaw participated.

The frontman Tony Wakeford has described it as his most personal album. According to the book Looking for Europe: Neofolk und Hintergründe, the song "An English Garden" appears to be inspired by the film The Innocents, based on the novel The Turn of the Screw by Henry James. The album liner notes include drawings by Tor Lundvall.

== Reception ==
John Bush of AllMusic described In the Rain as "a good collection of pop songs" but criticised Wakeford's vocals for being "occasionally erratic". The music scholar Isabella van Elferen analyzed the track "An English Garden" in 2013. She used its lyrics as an example of the nostalgia and sense of "not-belonging" present in goth music, and wrote that the instrumentation, song structure and chords evoke the "idealised British home of Goth", which becomes "musically disclosed as the locus of nothing less than the uncanny itself". The French music critic Jérôme Alberola wrote in 2016 that the album significantly changed the genre of neofolk, because it added cello, violin, piano and trumpet to the acoustic guitar and vocals, creating a new formula based on "slick production and the simple but effective beauty of the melodies". Cesare Buttaboni and Marco De Baptistis of Ondarock call it "undoubtedly Sol Invictus' masterpiece up to that point", highlighting the album's relatively varied vocals, the absence of filler tracks and how the lyrics attribute spiritual value to everyday details, which creates a message that is pessimistic but open to hope.

== Track listing ==
No.	Title	Length
1.	"Europa in the Rain I"	1:06
2.	"Stay"	4:47
3.	"Believe Me"	3:52
4.	"Down the Years"	4:22
5.	"In the Rain"	4:41
6.	"Fall Like Rain"	6:28
7.	"Oh What Fun"	2:55
8.	"An English Garden"	4:11
9.	"The World Shrugged"	4:12
10.	"In Days to Come"	4:03
11.	"Europa in the Rain II"	3:18

2011 reissue bonus tracks
No.	Title	Length
12.	"Hedda Gabbler"	8:28
13.	"Did You See"	4:45

== Personnel ==
- Tony Wakeford — Guitars, vocals
- Sarah Bradshaw — Cello
- David Mellor — Piano, keyboards
- Karl Blake — Electric guitar & bass
- Nathalie Van Keymeulen — Violin
- Céline Marleix-Bardeau — Violin
- Eric Rodgers — Trumpet
- Nick Hall — Drums, percussion
