= Lundvall =

Lundvall is a Swedish surname. Notable people with the surname include:

- Bengt Lundvall (1915–2010), Swedish Navy admiral
- Bengt-Åke Lundvall (born 1941), Danish emeritus professor
- Bruce Lundvall (1935–2015), American record company executive
- Lars-Eric Lundvall (1934–2020), Swedish ice hockey player
- Tor Lundvall (born 1968), American painter and musician
