= Pop-Eyes =

Studio album by Danielle Dax
- Released: 22 April 1983
- Recorded: Autumn 1982 at Tanglewood & Fortress Dax; Mixed at Phoenix Studio 15-17 November 1982
- Label: Awesome Records
- Producer: Danielle Dax

Danielle Dax chronology
Pop-Eyes (1983)	Jesus Egg That Wept (1984)

Pop-Eyes is the first solo album by Danielle Dax, an English experimental musician and former member of the Lemon Kittens. It was originally recorded in autumn 1982 and released on 22 April 1983 on the Awesome Records label.

== Background ==
Dax wrote and produced all the songs on the album as well as playing the guitar, drums, bass, flute, keyboards, banjo, tenor & soprano saxophones, trumpet, tapes, drone guitar, TR-808, toys and voices. The original "Meat Harvest" artwork for Pop Eyes was also created and compiled by Dax during January 1981 and proved to be too shocking for some in the music industry. It was later replaced with artwork created by Holly Warburton. Warburton's artwork can be found in most of Dax's early works.

The album was re-released in 1992 on the Biter of Thorpe label (BOT131-01CD) and distributed through World Serpent Distribution.

== Reception ==
Professional ratings
Review scores
Source	Rating
AllMusic	4/5 stars

Music Week reviewed the album after it was re-released in May 1985, noting that it had "not tarnished with the passing of time" and had "a refreshing and unpredictable blend of folk, ethnic and pop forms".

In a review for AllMusic, Michael Jourdan described the album as "idiosyncratic" and noted how "Dax puts odd musical bedfellows – from Middle Eastern percussion to doo wop vocals – next to each other in combinations that should clash, but instead complement each other nicely". He noted the "Arabic-flavored" opening song "Bed Caves" and the "absurd yet eerie" "Here Come the Harvest Buns".

In a retrospective look at Dax's career for the magazine Trouser Press, Ira Robbins and Andrea 'Enthal praised the "amazingly recorded" Pop-Eyes and singled out the song "Here Come the Harvest Buns" which "bounces with perky electronic keyboard percussion, triangle and bottle plinks" while managing to "[disguise] its dark message to cheating spouses".

== Track listing ==
All tracks are written by Danielle Dax.

No.	Title	Length
1.	"Bed Caves"	3:14
2.	"Everyone Squeaks Gently"	3:36
3.	"The Wheeled Wagon"	5:51
4.	"The Stone Guest"	1:59
5.	"Here Come the Harvest Buns"	3:00
6.	"The Shamemen"	3:44
7.	"Kernow"	4:18
8.	"Numb Companions"	3:59
9.	"Tower of Lies"	2:49
10.	"Cutting the Last Sheaf"	3:12

== Release history ==
Country	Date	Format	Label	Cat. No.	Ref.
United Kingdom	22 April 1983	LP	The Initial Recording Company	IRC 009	
United Kingdom	May 1985	LP (Alternate Artwork)	Awesome Records	AOR 2	
United Kingdom	29 December 1992	CD	Biter of Thorpe	BOT 131-01 CD	
Japan	27 June 2012	CD (Mini-LP replica sleeve)	Hayabusa Landings	HYCA-2057	
