= Star Test =

Star Test may refer to:

- Standardized Testing and Reporting in schools
- Star Test (TV series), a British TV programme
