= Blast the Human Flower =

Studio album by Danielle Dax
- Released: November 1990
- Studio: Greenhouse
- Length: 44:15
- Label: Sire
- Producers: Danielle Dax, Stephen Street

Danielle Dax chronology
Dark Adapted Eye (1988)	Blast the Human Flower (1990)	Comatose-Non-Reaction (1995)

Singles from Blast the Human Flower
- 1. "Tomorrow Never Knows" Released: 1990; 2. "Big Blue '82'" Released: 1991

Blast the Human Flower is an album by the English experimental musician Danielle Dax. It was her first album recorded while signed to Sire Records.

The cover artwork is by Stylorouge.

== Reception ==
Professional ratings
Review scores
Source	Rating
AllMusic	4.5/5 stars
Trouser Press	negative

Billboard noted the "interesting songs" but felt that Dax lacked "the kind of distinctive chops to break her out from the pack". The "exotic cover" of "Tomorrow Never Knows" was singled out in the review as "the best overture for modern rock radio". Music & Media felt that even though the album was "pretty offbeat", the "total avant garde extravaganza has gone".

== Track listing ==
All lyrics are written by Danielle Dax; all music is composed by Danielle Dax and David Knight except where noted.

Blast the Human Flower track listing
No.	Title	Writer(s)	Producer(s)	Length
1.	"The ID Parade"		Stephen Street	3:50
2.	"Tomorrow Never Knows"	John Lennon; Paul McCartney	Stephen Street	5:15
3.	"Big Blue '82'"		Stephen Street	4:08
4.	"Bayou"		Danielle Dax; Stephen Street	4:16
5.	"King Crack"		Stephen Street	2:10
6.	"Daisy"	Danielle Dax	Danielle Dax; Stephen Street	3:55
7.	"Dead Man's Chill"		Stephen Street	4:42
8.	"The Living and Their Stillborn"		Stephen Street	5:11
9.	"Jehovah's Precious Stone"		Stephen Street	5:07
10.	"16 Candles"	Danielle Dax	Stephen Street	5:36
Total length:				44:15

== Singles ==
=== Tomorrow Never Knows ===
U.K. 7" – Sire W 9529

1. "Tomorrow Never Knows" (Single version) – 3:31
2. "King Crack" – 2:10

U.K. 12" – Sire W 9529T

1. "Tomorrow Never Knows" (Album version) – 5:15
2. "Tomorrow Never Knows" (KSDS Mix) – 5:02
3. "Tomorrow Never Knows" (Lunar Mix) – 4:22

U.S. 12" – Sire 9 21773–0
U.S. Cassette – Sire 9 21773-4

1. "Tomorrow Never Knows" (Album version) – 5:15
2. "Tomorrow Never Knows" (Single version) – 3:31
3. "Tomorrow Never Knows" (KSDS Mix) – 5:02
4. "Tomorrow Never Knows" (Lunar Mix) – 4:22
5. "King Crack" – 2:10

U.S. CD – Sire 9 21773–2

1. "Tomorrow Never Knows" (Single version) – 3:31
2. "Tomorrow Never Knows" (Album version) – 5:15
3. "King Crack" – 2:10
4. "Tomorrow Never Knows" (KSDS Mix) – 5:02
5. "Tomorrow Never Knows" (Lunar Mix) – 4:22

=== Big Blue '82' ===
U.S. CD – Sire 9 40047–2

1. "Big Blue '82'" (Single Edit) – 4:17
2. "Big Blue '82'" (Zen Extended Mix) – 6:42
3. "Jehovah's Precious Stone" (Razormaid Mix) – 6:18
4. "Big Blue '82'" (Album version) – 4:08
5. "Jehovah's Precious Stone" (KSDS Mix) – 4:16

U.S. 12" (Promo) – Sire PRO–A–4736

1. "Big Blue '82'" (Single Edit) – 4:17
2. "Big Blue '82'" (Zen Extended Mix) – 6:42
3. "Big Blue '82'" (Album version) – 4:08
4. "Jehovah's Precious Stone" (Razormaid Mix) – 6:18
5. "Jehovah's Precious Stone" (KSDS Mix) – 4:16

=== Other songs ===
The songs "King Crack" and "Daisy" received radio adds in Switzerland in December 1990 despite neither being singles.

== Personnel ==
- Danielle Dax – Vocals, Keyboards, Guitar
- David Knight – Keyboards, Guitar, Bass
- Stephen Street – Keyboards, Guitar, Bass
- Karl Blake – Guitar
- Peter Farrugia – Guitar, Bass
- David Cross – Violin
- Anna Palm – Violin

== Release history ==
Country	Date	Label	Format	Cat. No.	Ref.
United States	November 1990	Sire; Warner Bros.	CD; Cassette	9 26126-2; 9 26126-4	
United Kingdom	14 January 1991	Sire	LP; Cassette; CD	7599 26126-1; 7599 26126-4; 7599 26126-2	
Japan	25 January 1991	Sire	CD	WPCP-4031	
United States	14 October 2008	Noble Rot	CD	NOT5019	
