= In the Rain =

In the Rain may refer to:

== Music ==
=== Albums ===
- In the Rain (album), by Sol Invictus, 1995
- In the Rain, by Lim Yee Chung, 2007

=== Songs ===
- "In The Rain" (song), by The Dramatics, 1972
- "In The Rain", by Addison Rae from Addison, 2025
- "In the Rain", by Alexandra Burke from The Truth Is, 2018
- "In the Rain", by Estelle from Shine, 2008
- "In the Rain", by Kenny G from Breathless, 1992
