= Chemical Wedding =

Chemical Wedding may refer to:

== Literature ==
- Chymical Wedding of Christian Rosenkreutz, a 1616 book by Johannes Valentinus Andreae
- The Chymical Wedding, a 1989 novel by Lindsay Clarke

== Music ==
- The Chemical Wedding (Danielle Dax album), 1987
- The Chemical Wedding (Bruce Dickinson album), 1998

== Other uses ==
- Chemical Wedding (film), a 2008 British film
