= Born to Be Bad =

Born to Be Bad may refer to:

== Music ==
- Born to Be Bad (album), a 1988 George Thorogood studio album
- "Born to Be Bad" (The Runaways song)
- "Born to Be Bad", a track from Danielle Dax's album Inky Bloaters
- "Born to Be Bad", a track on the Neil Sedaka album All You Need Is the Music

== Other ==
- Born to Be Bad (1934 film), starring Cary Grant and Loretta Young
- Born to Be Bad (1950 film), an unrelated film featuring Joan Fontaine and Robert Ryan
- "Born to Be Bad", an episode of the animated television series Bionic Six
- Born to Be B.A.D., a Sherrilyn Kenyon short story collection

== See also ==
- Born Bad, a 2011 American crime thriller film
