= Chrystal Belle Scrodd =

British solo music project

Chrystal Belle Scrodd is the stage name and solo musical project of Diana Rogerson, an occasional member and associate of British experimental group Nurse With Wound.

Scrodd's first album, The Inevitable Chrystal Belle Scrodd Record, was released on the United Dairies label in 1985 and featured contributions from Steven Stapleton of Nurse With Wound, Robert Haigh and Karl Blake, among others. A second album, Belle de Jour, was released in 1986.

The 1993 compilation Beastings collects tracks from both releases, and the 1999 Nurse With Wound compilation The Swinging Reflective collects three of these recordings (credited to Diana Rogerson).
