= Carcrash International =

English post-punk band

- Origin: London, England
- Genres: Gothic rock; post-punk
- Years active: 1983–1985, 1993–1995
- Labels: Crammed Discs, L'Invitation Au Suicide, Cleopatra,
- Spinoff of: Sex Gang Children; Crisis
- Past members: Dave Roberts; Matthew Best; Lester Jones; Pip Knapp; Nigel Preston; Stephanie Paynes; Matt Green; Nicky Garratt; Barry Galvin; David Glass; Ian Haas; D.A.

Carcrash International was an English rock band associated with the Batcave scene, formed by Dave Roberts (aka Dave Sex Gang), original bass player of Sex Gang Children, who used the name for two projects, drummer Matthew Best (later of Psychic TV) and guitarist Lester Jones (formerly of Crisis).

== History ==
The band made their initial appearance in 1983 on the compilation album The Whip with the title track "The Whip". The song was performed by Dave Roberts (credited as Dave Sex Gang, formerly of Sex Gang Children) on vocals and guitar, drummer Matthew Best (later of Psychic TV) and guitarist Lester Jones (formerly of Crisis). The record also featured a song by Best called "32nd Piano Concerto in A Minor".

Later the same year, a new version of "The Whip" was released as a single (credited to Carcrash International), which included another track, "The White Hotel", along with two mixes of the title track. The band had then expanded to include violinist Pip Knapp and a second drummer, Roberts' Sex Gang bandmate Nigel Preston (formerly of Theatre of Hate, and later of Death Cult, the Cult, the Baby Snakes and the Gun Club).

A second 12" single, "All Passion Spent", was released in 1984, backed by "Dial First... (P.O.A.)". For this release, the band was a trio consisting of Roberts, Best and new guitarist Stephanie Paynes.

Roberts assembled an all-new Carcrash International lineup for 1985 12" single "Crash", which was backed by "Mercenaries for War" (a John Cale cover) and "Seduction".

In 1993, the recently established Cleopatra Records label re-released an expanded version of The Whip compilation featuring both the title track and "The Whip II". A UK edition issued by Jungle Records also credited "32nd Piano Concerto in A Minor" to Carcrash International.

Following the Whip reissue and 1992 Sex Gang Children reunion, Roberts also formed a new darker, more gothic rock-oriented version of the band, releasing Carcrash International's sole full-length studio album, Fragments of a Journal in Hell in 1993 on Cleopatra. Among the session musicians appearing on the album were Matt Green (ex-Spahn Ranch) on keyboards, and Nicky Garratt (ex-U.K. Subs) and Colin Dminchin on guitar. Also playing on the album were two former Christian Death members, guitarist Barry Galvin and drummer David Glass, both then of Mephisto Walz). The release was followed by a promotional concert in San Francisco in 1994, by a lineup consisting of Roberts on bass, Ian Haas (original drummer of London After Midnight on drums and D.A. on guitar). Carcrash International disbanded the following year.

== Discography ==
=== Studio albums ===
- Fragments of a Journal in Hell (1994, Cleopatra Records)

=== Singles ===
- "The Title Track From 'The Whip'" (1983, Crammed Discs)
- "All Passion Spent" (1984, Crammed Discs)
- "Crash" (1985, L'Invitation Au Suicide)

=== Compilation appearances ===
- "The Whip" (as Dave Sex Gang) on The Whip (1983, Kamera Records)
- "The Whip" and "The Whip II" on The Whip (1993, Cleopatra Records)
- "The Whip", "The Whip II" and "32nd Piano Concerto in A Minor" on The Whip (1993, Jungle Records)
- "Last Remains" on In Goth Daze (1994, Cleopatra Records)
- "Decades" on Art of Gothic (1994, Talitha Records)
