= Tor Lundvall =

American painter

Tor Lundvall (born 1968 in Wyckoff, New Jersey) is a painter and musician who is based out of East Hampton, New York.

== Early life and education ==
Lundvall graduated in 1987 from Saddle River Day School He has a B.A. in studio art with a minor in literature from the American University in Washington D.C. (1991).

== Art ==
His oil paintings are quite vivid and luminous due to his use of vibrant colors and the strong tension created between light and shadow. Lundvall's imagery is mostly inspired by rural northeastern American landscapes which he inhabits with imaginative figures and isolated individuals. His canvases often depict serene environments with an underlying sense of menace.

Tor first came into the public eye in the early 1990s through his art exhibitions in New York and after creating the CD artwork for various musicians, including several projects for Tony Wakeford's dark folk group Sol Invictus.

Lundvall has also produced cover art for Gonzalo Rubalcaba's Solo CD (2006) and Miles Davis's The Blue Note and Capitol Recordings CD box-set reissue (1993), both released on Blue Note Records. His paintings have also been featured on the covers of the March 2007 and July 2008 issues of Asimov's Science Fiction magazine. Lundvall went on to create many of his own cover artworks.

== Music ==
A resident of Wyckoff, New Jersey, Lundvall is also a musician, and his compositions are often described as dark ambient. His first album, Passing Through Alone (1997) was co-produced with his brother Kurt Lundvall and could be categorized in the Industrial music genre, as it shared little in common musically with subsequent releases. At the time Passing Through Alone was only available at Lundvall's gallery showings, but is now available again through his website.

Described by BrooklynVegan as an "ambient wizard", Lundvall came to prominence as a recording artist with the release of Autumn Calls (1998), a collaboration with Tony Wakeford released on the now defunct British record label World Serpent Distribution. Three solo albums followed, continuing the seasons-themed concept: Ice (1999), The Mist (2001) and Under the Shadows of Trees (2003).

After the demise of World Serpent in 2004, Lundvall released his recordings through the American label Strange Fortune until November 2008. His major releases for Strange Fortune included Last Light (2004), Empty City (2006) and the Yule EP (2006). Lundvall developed a "trademark, soft falsetto" voice, although Empty City features his first attempt at a largely instrumental approach for an entire album. In 2009, he began working with another American label Dais Records, which released the albums Sleeping and Hiding (2009), The Shipyard (2012) and The Park (2015) in vinyl format. Dais also released three CD box sets by Lundvall, The Seasons Unfold (2011), Structures and Solitude (2013) and Nature Laughs As Time Slips By (2016). All of Lundvall's recordings are mastered by his brother Kurt. He returned to vocal music with A Dark Place (2018). Witness Marks, an LP of Lundvall material remixed by John B. McLemore (subject of the podcast S-Town), was also released in 2018.

Tor Lundvall's music has evolved over the years from early pop songs, to a more ambient sound, which he personally finds difficult to describe or categorize.

"I suppose one could call it 'ghost ambient'! I approach my music in a visual way, starting with a very basic idea and slowly building on it. The tracks are essentially paintings with music and their titles usually reflect the contents. I have also gained a new respect for the piano over the past several years, which plays a major part in my recordings. Although I tend to use electronics and samplers, I always approach music in a natural, organic way. All samples are created at home, usually in the bedroom. I loathe patch presets and use them only rarely. In fact the process of recording is so complex, that the 'equipment used' section printed in my CD booklets is basically useless.

I find that my recent recordings are becoming progressively more instrumental and ambient in nature, although the music still retains a strong sense of melody. As with my paintings, my music has always existed in a private world of its own."

Lundvall's oeuvre was described in Amoeba Music's Music We Like series as "Misty blue and lilacs... with slow moving minor-key vocal and instrumental pieces dripping with smoky perplexity and shrouded mystery. Grey hazes on the wharf, the human mystique, regret of folly and wisps of moonlight waterfalls color this world." His personal all-time favourite albums include Peter Gabriel 3 (1980), The Return of the Durutti Column (1980), Orchestral Manoeuvres in the Dark's Architecture & Morality (1981), Harold Budd and Brian Eno's The Pearl (1984), and Slowdive's Pygmalion (1995).

== Discography ==
=== Albums / Singles / EPs ===
Year	Title	Format	Special Notes
1997	Passing Through Alone	CD	Private release of early 'pop' material.
1998	Autumn Calls	CD	Collaboration with Tony Wakeford.
1999	Ice	CD	Winter installment of the seasons-themed albums.
2001	The Mist	CD	Spring installment of the seasons-themed albums.
2002	Evening / Leaves	7" Picture Disc	Limited edition of 500 copies.
2003	Under The Shadows Of Trees	CD	Summer installment of the seasons-themed albums.
2004	Last Light	CD	Limited edition of 955 hand-numbered copies.
2006	Empty City	CD	Limited edition of 955 hand-numbered copies.
2006	Yule	CDEP	Limited edition of 333 hand-numbered copies.
2007	The Seasons Unfold Sampler	CDEP	Promotional sampler for forthcoming 4xCD box set "The Seasons Unfold".
2008	Winter Song / The Watchers	7"	1st release in the label's Mizuko Jizo 7" series. Limited edition of 350 copies on violet vinyl.
2009	Insect Wings, Leaf Matter & Broken Twigs	CD	Early Ambient Recordings: 1991–1994.
2009	Sleeping And Hiding	LP	Limited edition of 500 hand-numbered copies in foil-embossed sleeve with full-color insert.
2010	Ghost Years	CD	Retrospective featuring tracks from compilations, vinyl and unreleased material.
2011	The Seasons Unfold	4xCD Box Set	Contains remastered and expanded editions of "Ice", "The Mist" and "Under the Shadows of Trees" plus a 4th bonus disc entitled "Turning" which features the basic ambient tracks for "Autumn Calls" plus unreleased material from the period. Limited edition of 500 hand-numbered copies.
2011	Field Trip	Cassette EP	Limited edition of 46 hand-numbered copies with silk screen printed artwork.
2012	The Shipyard	LP	Limited edition of 500 hand-numbered copies in matte sleeve with gloss-overlaid artwork and full-color insert.
2013	Structures And Solitude	5xCD Box Set	Contains remastered and expanded editions of "Last Light" and "Empty City" plus the CD editions of "Sleeping And Hiding" and "The Shipyard". The 5th disc entitled "Night Studies" consists of 18 instrumental vignettes recorded between April and August 2013. Limited edition of 500 copies.
2014	Ibis / Quiet Seaside	7"	Collaboration with Leila Abdul-Rauf. Limited edition of 300 copies.
2015	The Park	LP	Limited edition of 300 copies.
2016	Nature Laughs As Time Slips By	5xCD Box Set	Contains the CD edition of "The Park", "The Violet-Blue House" (new), "Rain Studies" (new), an expanded CD edition of "Field Trip" and a second volume of "Insect Wings, Leaf Matter & Broken Twigs - Early Ambient Recordings: 1991-1994". Limited edition of 500 copies.
2018	A Dark Place	LP	Limited edition of 500 copies (400 black vinyl / 100 transparent purple vinyl) in foil-embossed, reverse board sleeve with full-color inner sleeve.
2019	A Strangeness In Motion	LP	Early Pop Recordings: 1989–1999. Limited edition of 1000 copies (500 black vinyl / 400 clearwater blue vinyl / 100 clear with yellow swirl vinyl) in matte finish sleeve with gloss-overlaid artwork and full-color inner sleeve.
2020	Yule	LP	Vinyl edition of the Holiday album released as a limited edition CD in 2006. Limited edition of 2000 copies (800 black vinyl / 600 clear red vinyl / 400 clear green vinyl / 200 peppermint vinyl) in foil-embossed sleeve with full-color inner sleeve.
2021	Beautiful Illusions	LP	
2022	Forget It!	LP	

=== Compilation tracks ===
Year	Song title	Compilation	Format	Special Notes
1996	Ghost Years (alternate version)	"On Magazine"	CD	Original version released on "Passing Through Alone".
1998	The Big Nowhere	"What is Eternal"	CD	Collaboration with Tony Wakeford.
1999	The Falling Snow (remixed edited version)	"Eisteddfod"	CD	Full length version released on the "Yule" EP.
2000	My Weakness	"MM"	CD	World Serpent promotional compilation.
2000	29	"Ostia"	CD	Identical to version released on "The Mist".
2002	Tears and Rain	"Sol Lucet Omnibus - A Tribute to Sol Invictus"	2xCD	
2002	Treetop	"Songs for Landeric - Music for a New Born Son"	2xCD	Recorded during the "Under the Shadows of Trees" sessions.
2005	Aliénor	"Songs for Aliénor - Music for a New Born Daughter"	2xCD	
2007	Birds Asleep	"Dream Magazine #7"	CD	Out-take from the "Under the Shadows of Trees" sessions.
2010	The Shipyard In Winter / Safety In Grey	"With Friends Like These"	2xCD	Out-takes from "The Shipyard" sessions.
2014	Orange Leaves	"Ethereality: A Radio Mystic Compilation"	free digital download	Identical to version later released on "Rain Studies".
2016	A Room By The Sea	"Where Words Fail, Music Speaks - A Compilation For Ania Mehring"	digital download	Out-take from the "Rain Studies" sessions.
