= We Buy a Hammer for Daddy =

Studio album by Lemon Kittens
- Released: 1980
- Genre: Experimental rock
- Length: 35:08
- Label: United Dairies
- Producer: Lemon Kittens

Lemon Kittens chronology
Spoonfed and Writhing (1979)	We Buy a Hammer for Daddy (1980)	The Big Dentist (1982)

We Buy a Hammer for Daddy is the debut studio album by English experimental rock band Lemon Kittens. It was released in 1980, through record label United Dairies.

== Background ==
The phrase "We buy a hammer for Daddy" originates from the caption to an illustration in the 1958 Ladybird book Shopping with Mother.

== Track listing ==
All tracks composed by the Lemon Kittens

Side L
No.	Title	Length
1.	"Pain Topics"	4:24
2.	"Reversal 2"	2:34
3.	"These Men of Old England"	2:25
4.	"Wrist Job / Once Green and Pleasant Land"	2:45
5.	"Lycanthrothene"	3:06
6.	"Motet"	3:10
7.	"Throat Violence"	2:28
8.	"False Alarm (Malicious)"	1:58

Side K
No.	Title	Length
1.	"P.V.S"	1:55
2.	"Small Mercies"	2:03
3.	"Coasters"	3:48
4.	"Up in Arms"	2:34
5.	"The American Cousin"	1:50
6.	"Evidence"	2:25
7.	"Rome Burning"	1:31
8.	"(Afraid of Being) Bled by Leeches"	2:14

== Critical reception ==
Professional ratings
Review scores
Source	Rating
AllMusic	4.5/5 stars

AllMusic's review was highly favourable, writing, "The tracks [...] are all highly original and have little precedent either in or beyond the annals of British pop/rock [...] We Buy a Hammer for Daddy belongs with Alternative TV's Vibing Up the Senile Man and the first This Heat LP as one of the milestones of experimental rock music."

== Personnel ==
Lemon Kittens

- Danielle Dax – vocals, bass, keyboards, tenor saxophone, soprano saxophone, flute, drone guitar, stick synthesizer], penny whistle, squeeze box, sleeve design, artwork
- Karl Blake – vocals, guitar, drums, bass, keyboards, recorder, stick synthesizer, squeeze box

Technical

- Bombay Ducks – engineering
- David Mellor – engineering
