= Cathouse =

Cathouse may refer to:

- Brothel

== Arts and entertainment ==
- Cathouse: The Series, an HBO reality television series first aired in 2005
- Cathouse, a 1988 novella by Dean Ing, reprinted in multiple anthologies of the Man–Kzin Wars series
- "Cathouse", a song from the 1987 album Faster Pussycat by the band of the same name
- "The Cathouse Murders", an episode of the 2025 documentary miniseries Secrets of the Bunny Ranch

== Business ==
- Glasgow Cathouse, a nightclub in Scotland launched in 1990
- CatHouse, a restaurant and nightclub at the Luxor Las Vegas, in operation from 2007 to 2012

== See also ==
- Cat House (disambiguation)
