= Sex Gang Children =

British band

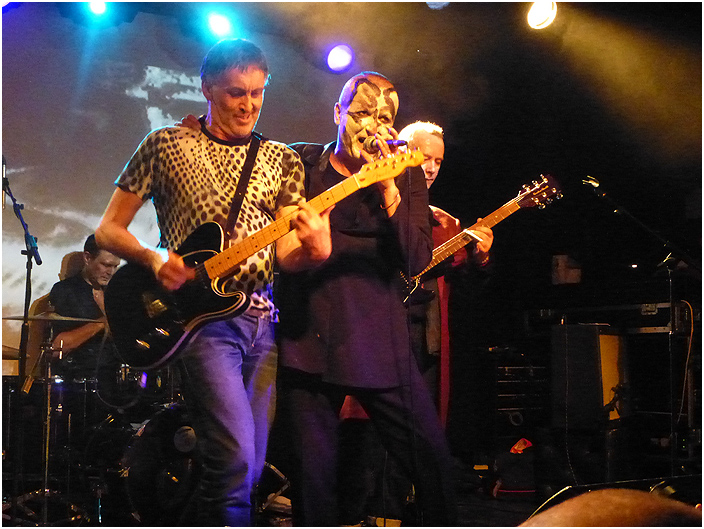
- Sex Gang Children performing in 2014

Background information
- Origin: Brixton, London, England
- Genres: Gothic rock, post-punk, deathrock
- Years active: 1982–1984, 1992–present
- Labels: Cleopatra, Cherry Red, Illuminated, ROIR, Liberation London
- Members: Andi Sex Gang; Rob Stroud; John Rigby; Jerome Alexandre
- Past members: Dave Roberts; Terry MacLeay; Kevin Matthews; Matthew Saw; Nigel Preston; Ray Mondo; Cam Campbell; Adrian Portas; Karl Magnussen; Bob Thompson; Lester Jones; Gerrard Santana; Steve Harle
- Website: andisexgang.com

Sex Gang Children are an early gothic rock and post-punk band that formed in early 1982 in Brixton in London, England. Although the original group only released one official studio album, their singles and various other tracks have been packaged into numerous collections and they remain one of the more well-known bands of the early Batcave scene and have reformed for new albums and touring at various times since the early 1990s.

== History ==
The original lineup was Andi Sex Gang (vocals, guitar), Dave Roberts (bass), Terry McLeay (guitar) and Rob Stroud (drums). They were a dramatic band, relying on heavy bass, tribal drumming, sudden mood shifts, dramatic vocals and a cabaret sound (influencing the rise of the later dark cabaret scene). The band's first release was a cassette-only live album, Naked, in 1982. The Beasts EP, their first vinyl release, followed the same year after they signed to the Illuminated label. The band's only studio album from their original period together, Song and Legend, was released in 1983, reaching the top of the UK Indie Chart and spawning the single "Sebastiane". Stroud departed to form Aemoti Crii, to be replaced by former Theatre of Hate drummer Nigel Preston, who played on the band's next single, "Mauritia Mayer", before himself being replaced by former Death Cult drummer Ray Mondo. Roberts left in late 1983 to form Carcrash International, and the line-up settled to Andi, McLeay, Cam Campbell (bass) and Kevin Matthews (drums), a change forced by Ray Mondo's deportation to his native Sierra Leone.

Following McLeay's departure in 1984, the band was renamed Andi Sex Gang & the Quick Gas Gang for the 1985 Blind! album and tour (McLeay did not leave until after that album's recording, however; guitarist Lester Jones from Crisis performed the live shows). The band split afterwards.

Renewed interest in the band in the United States led to a reformation in 1991, including Roberts, and a new album, Medea, in 1993. As a solo artist, Andi went on to make a number of well-received albums for various labels.

One of the groups coming up at the same time as Southern Death Cult was Sex Gang Children, and Andi — he used to dress like a Banshees fan, and I used to call him the Gothic Goblin because he was a little guy, and he's dark. He used to like Édith Piaf and this macabre music, and he lived in a building in Brixton called Visigoth Towers. So he was the little Gothic Goblin and his followers were Goths. That's where goth came from.

— Ian Astbury of the Cult, (Alternative Press, November 1994).

== Name ==
Sex Gang Children were originally called Panic Button. The name "Sex Gang Children" was taken by Malcolm McLaren from a William Burroughs novel as a possible name for the band that became Bow Wow Wow (and is referenced in their song "Mile High Club") and was one of the names that Boy George considered for his band before choosing "Culture Club". SGC vocalist Andi tried to persuade George to use the name, but when Culture Club drummer Jon Moss passed on the idea, Andi decided that the name should not go to waste.

== Discography ==
Chart placings shown are from the UK Indie Chart.

=== Studio albums ===
- Song and Legend (1983, Illuminated Records) No. 1
- Blind (1985, Illuminated Records), (1992 reissue, Cleopatra Records)
- Medea (1993, Cleopatra Records)
- The Wrath of God (2000, Dressed to Kill)
- Bastard Art (2002, Burning Airlines)
- Viva Vigilante! (2013, Pale Music)
- Oligarch (2021, Liberation London)

=== Singles and EPs ===
- Beasts (1982, Illuminated Records) No. 8
- "Into the Abyss" (1982, Illuminated Records) No. 7
- "Sebastiane" (1983, Illuminated Records) No. 19
- "Mauritia Mayer" (1983, Clay Records) No. 7
- "Dieche" (1984, Illuminated Records) (No. 15)
- "The Quick Gas Gang" split with Christian Death (1992, Cleopatra Records)
- "Salamun Child" (2009, Song & Legend)
- "Hollywood Slim M G T Remix" (2014, self-released)
- "Sebastiane" (2014, Song & Legend)
- "Death Mask Mussolini" (2021)

=== Live albums ===
- Naked (1982, self-released) No. 15
- Sex Gang Children (1984, self-released)
- Ecstasy and Vendetta Over New York (1984, ROIR) No. 20
- Nightland (Performance USA 83) (1986, Arkham)
- Play with Children (1992, Cleopatra Records)
- Live in Paris '84 (1996, Nigma Records)
- Live in Vienna (2011, Pink Noise)
- Live at the Batcave (2014, Liberation London)

=== Compilation albums ===
- Beasts (1983, Illuminated Records)
- Re-enter the Abyss (The 1985 Remixes) (1985, Dojo Records) No. 22
- The Hungry Years - The Best of Sex Gang Children (1991, Receiver Records)
- Dieche (1993, Cleopatra Records)
- Welcome to My World (1998, Receiver Records)
- Pop Up - The Rare and Unreleased World of Sex Gang (1999, Dressed to Kill)
- Shout & Scream: The Definitive Sex Gang Children (1997, Age of Panik)
- The Legends Collection: The Sex Gang Children Collection (2000, Dressed to Kill)
- The Dark Archives - Volume One (2000, Hollow Hills)
- Empyre and Fall (2000, Hollow Hills)
- Demonstration! (2000, Magicavern)
- Fall: The Complete Singles 1982-1992 (2001, Burning Airlines)
- Execution & Elegance: The Anthology 1982-2002 (2004, Castle Music)
- Demonstration - Expanded Deluxe Edition (2008, Song & Legend)
- Electric Jezebel - Singles Collection A & B Sides 1982-83 (2016, Liberation London)
- Fear, Silk, and Sex 1981 - 2013 (2019, Cleopatra Records)

=== Home videos ===
- Live at Ocean (2002, MVD Visual)
