= Song and Legend =

Studio album by Sex Gang Children
- Released: 1983
- Recorded: November 1982
- Studio: Jacobs Studios, Farnham, England
- Genre: Gothic rock; post-punk
- Length: 53:19
- Label: Illuminated
- Producer: Tony James

Singles from Song and Legend
- 1. "Sebastiane" Released: 1983

Song and Legend is the debut studio album by English gothic rock band Sex Gang Children. It was released in 1983 by record label Illuminated.

== Content ==
Trouser Press described Tony James' production as "[smothering] everything [...] in tons of echo, giving the album a haunting, catacomb sheen".

== Release ==
According to The Rough Guide to Rock, the album "shot to the top of the indie charts, along with its accompanying single 'Sebastiane'".

== Critical reception ==
Trouser Press called Song and Legend "a landmark in gothic/post-punk, holding forth with an unequalled baroque fury".

== Track listing ==
Side A
No.	Title	Length
1.	"The Crack Up"	3:42
2.	"German Nun"	3:08
3.	"(Chant) State of Mind"	3:28
4.	"Sebastiane"	3:14
5.	"Draconian Dream"	3:59

Side B
No.	Title	Length
1.	"Shout and Scream"	3:30
2.	"Killer 'K'"	3:15
3.	"Cannibal Queen"	2:01
4.	"(Abyss)"	2:24
5.	"Kill Machine"	2:00
6.	"Song and Legend"	3:48
7.	"(Dream Reprise)"	3:02

CD bonus tracks
No.	Title	Length
14.	"Shout and Scream" (Acoustic Version)	4:49
15.	"Sebastiane" (Acoustic Version)	4:39
16.	"Song and Legend" (Acoustic Version)	5:18

== Personnel ==
Sex Gang Children

- Andi (Andi Sexgang) – vocals, guitar
- Terry MacLeay – guitar
- Dave Roberts – bass guitar
- Rob Stroud – drums

Technical

- Tony James – production
- Ken Thomas – engineering
