= Shock Headed Peters =

British post-punk band

- Origin: England
- Genres: Post-punk
- Years active: 1982–1987, 1990–1996
- Labels: él Records; Cyclops Prod
- Past members: Karl Blake; Ashley Wales; Dave Knight; Mark Rowlatt; Clive Glover

Shock Headed Peters were a British post-punk band, formed in 1982. The band took their name from the 19th-century German's children book Der Struwwelpeter ("Shockheaded Peter") by Heinrich Hoffmann.

== History ==
In 1982, Karl Blake formed Shock Headed Peters with Ashley Wales, eventually adding Dave Knight, then Mark Rowlatt and Clive Glover.

From 1984 to 1986, the band often toured with The Dave Howard Singers.

Ashley Wales went on to join the Drum & Bass/Avant Jazz duo Spring Heel Jack

Shock Headed Peters disbanded in October 1987 before reforming in 1990, again with founder-members Blake and Knight. Drummer/percussionist Dave Smith of Guapo occasionally played with the second incarnation of Shock Headed Peters. The band collaborated with Danielle Dax on "Hate On Sight", a track included on Dax's 1995 album Comatose Non-Reaction: The Thwarted Pop Career of Danielle Dax.

== Discography ==
- I, Bloodbrother Be (EP and single, 1984), él Records
- The Kissing of Gods (EP and single, 1985), él Records
- Not Born Beautiful (LP, 1985), él Records
- Life Extinguisher (EP, 1986), Beach Culture — features a collaboration with David Cross
- Fear Engine (LP, 1987), Produkt Korps
- Several Headed Enemy (CD, 1992), Cyclops Prod
- Fear Engine II - Almost As If It Had Never Happened (CD, 1993), Cyclops Prod
- Tendercide (CD, 1996), Cyclops Prod
- Not Alone (Compilation, contributing track) (2006)
