= Above the Ruins =

British post-punk band

- Origin: England
- Genres: Post-punk
- Years active: 1984–1987
- Spinoff of: Crisis; Death in June
- Past members: Tony Wakeford

Above the Ruins were an English post-punk band. They were controversial for their association with the National Front (UK). Although the band's membership was unknown at the time, it was later discovered that it had been formed by Tony Wakeford, who subsequently distanced himself from right-wing politics and formed Sol Invictus in 1987.

== History ==
In early 1984, Tony Wakeford had been a supporter of the National Front (UK), and was fired from the band Death in June for "bringing his 'right-wing leanings into the group'". He subsequently formed Above the Ruins, named after the book Men Among the Ruins by Italian philosopher and fascist Julius Evola. In October 1984, Above the Ruins recorded their nine song demo album Songs of the Wolf "somewhere in East London" and subsequently released it on cassette, which was distributed through the London-based P.O. box BCM Grimnir, and from the National Front bookshop in Croydon. The band's lyrics denounced communism, capitalism and liberalism. The demo received a favorable review from Nationalism Today, the journal of the National Front. The following year, Above the Ruins contributed the song "The Killing Zone" to No Surrender, a compilation LP of white nationalist bands, and in late 1985, announced that their demo would be "soon to be available on record". In 1987, Wakeford distanced himself from right-wing views, and formed Sol Invictus. Years afterward, Wakeford denied ever having been a member of the National Front or Above the Ruins, but later admitted to having been a member of both. The rest of the band members' identities is unknown, despite much speculation and rumours. In 2007, Wakeford described his National Front membership as "probably the worst decision of my life".

== Discography ==
- Songs of the Wolf (1984)
