= Mauritia Mayer =

Single by Sex Gang Children
- B-side: "Children's Prayer"
- Released: 1983
- Recorded: 1983
- Genre: Gothic rock
- Label: Clay Records
- Songwriter(s): Andi Sex Gang, Dave Roberts
- Producer(s): Tony James

Sex Gang Children singles chronology
"Into the Abyss" (1982)	"Mauritia Mayer" (1983)	"Dieche" (1984)

"Mauritia Mayer" is the fourth single by English gothic rock band Sex Gang Children, and their first on Clay Records. It reached No. 7 on the UK Indie Singles Chart.
