= The Janice Long Session EP =

EP by Danielle Dax
- Released: March 1988
- Recorded: BBC Radio 1
- Label: Awesome Records
- Producer: Danielle Dax

Danielle Dax chronology
The Chemical Wedding (1987)	The Janice Long Session EP (1988)	Dark Adapted Eye (1988)

The Janice Long Session EP is an EP by Danielle Dax, an English experimental musician and former member of The Lemon Kittens. It was later released as the BBC Sessions in the U.S. in 1991. It was recorded on 1 December 1985, and was first transmitted on 14 January 1986. The recording was later released in 1988 on the Strange Fruit Records label.

Dax provided vocals and played synthesizers, David Knight played synthesizers, Ian Sturgess played bass, and percussion, Steve Reeves played guitar, and Martyn Watts played drums. The cover artwork is by AJ Barratt / Retna Pictures Ltd.

== Reception ==
Music Week noted the EP "displayed a wide range of material", ranging from "the relentless power of the live favourite" "Fizzing Human Bomb" to the "hypnotic drone" of "Numb Companions", and is "a must for fans".

== Track listing ==
1. "Fizzing Human-Bomb" (3:39)
2. "Pariah" (3:36)
3. "Ostrich" (3:57)
4. "Numb Companions" (3:20)

== Charts ==
Chart (1987)	Peak position
UK Indie Chart (MRIB)	24
UK Indie Chart (Music Week)	44
