= Andi Sex Gang =

British vocalist and songwriter

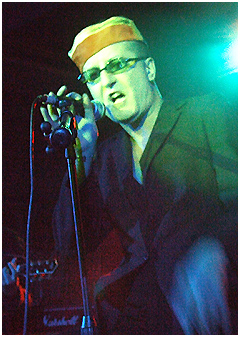
Andi Sex Gang (2007)

Andi Sex Gang (born Andreas Graham McElligot) is the founder, vocalist and main songwriter of the band Sex Gang Children who were a prominent act in the gothic rock movement of the 1980s. His band played at the iconic Batcave club in 1982. He has also recorded as an experimental solo artist.

McElligot lived in London squats before entering music, and was involved in leftist activism. He formed the band in early 1982. In the late 1980s, McElligot obtained the rights to the material he had released with the band and controls its licensing. Over the years, he had a number of conflicts with a number of record companies.

In 2011, a documentary, Bastard Art, by Vince Corkadel presented an overview of his career.

== Discography ==
=== Sex Gang Children ===
==== Studio albums ====
- Song and Legend (1983, Illuminated Records)
- Blind (1992 reissue, Cleopatra Records)
- Medea (1993, Cleopatra Records)
- The Wrath of God (2000, Dressed to Kill)
- Bastard Art (2002, Burning Airlines)
- Viva Vigilante! (2013, Pale Music)

==== Singles & EPs ====
- Beasts (1982, Illuminated Records)
- "Into the Abyss" (1982, Illuminated Records)
- "Sebastiane" (1983, Illuminated Records)
- "Mauritia Mayer" (1983, Clay Records)
- "Dieche" (1984, Illuminated Records)
- "The Quick Gas Gang" split with Christian Death (1992, Cleopatra Records)
- "Salamun Child" (2009, Song & Legend)
- "Hollywood Slim M G T Remix" (2014, self-released)
- "Sebastiane" (2014, Song & Legend)

==== Live albums ====
- Naked (1982, self-released) No. 15
- Sex Gang Children (1984, self-released)
- Ecstasy and Vendetta Over New York (1984, ROIR)
- Nightland (Performance USA 83) (1986, Arkham)
- Play with Children (1992, Cleopatra Records)
- Live in Paris '84 (1996, Nigma Records)
- Live in Vienna (2011, Pink Noise)
- Live at the Batcave (2014, Liberation London)

==== Compilation albums ====
- Beasts (1983, Illuminated Records)
- Re-enter the Abyss (The 1985 Remixes) (1985, Dojo Records)
- The Hungry Years - The Best of Sex Gang Children (1991, Receiver Records)
- Dieche (1993, Cleopatra Records)
- Welcome to My World (1998, Receiver Records)
- Pop Up - The Rare and Unreleased World of Sex Gang (1999, Dressed to Kill)
- Shout & Scream: The Definitive Sex Gang Children (1997, Age of Panik)
- The Legends Collection: The Sex Gang Children Collection (2000, Dressed to Kill)
- The Dark Archives - Volume One (2000, Hollow Hills)
- Empyre and Fall (2000, Hollow Hills)
- Demonstration! (2000, Magicavern)
- Fall: The Complete Singles 1982-1992 (2001, Burning Airlines)
- Execution & Elegance: The Anthology 1982-2002 (2004, Castle Music)
- Demonstration - Expanded Deluxe Edition (2008, Song & Legend)
- Electric Jezebel - Singles Collection A & B Sides 1982-83 (2016, Liberation London)

=== Andi Sex Gang ===
==== Studio albums ====
- Blind! (1985, Illuminated Records)
- Arco Valley (1989, Jungle Records)
- God on a Rope (1993, Cleopatra Records)
- Western Songs for Children (1994, Triple X Records)
- Gabriel and the Golden Horn with Mick Rossi (1997, Hollows Hill Sound Recordings)
- Veil (1999, Magicavern)
- Last of England (1999, Dressed to Kill)
- Faithfull Covers: A Tribute to Marianne Faithfull (2000, Disoriente)
- The Madman in the Basket (2006, Pink Noise)
- Inventing New Destruction (2007, Pink Noise)
- The Devil's Cabaret (2011, Eastworld Recordings)
- Achilles in the Eurozone (2015, Code Black)

==== Singles & EPs ====
- "Les Amants d'Un Jour" (1984, Illuminated Records)
- Dirty Roseanne as Dirty Roseanne (1985, Illuminated Records)
- "Ida-Ho" (1985, Illuminated Records)
- "The Naked & the Dead" (1986, Revolver Records)
- "Seven Ways to Kill a Man" (1988, Jungle Records)
- "Assassin Years" (1988, Jungle Records)

==== Compilation albums ====
- Helter Skelter (2001, Dressed to Kill)
- Perception in the Heart of Darkness: The Best of Andi Sex Gang (2007, Pink Noise)

==== Audiobooks ====
- Bram Stoker's Dracula (2010, Pink Noise)

==== Home videos ====
- Live at Heaven's Gate (2008, Pink Noise)
