= The Chemical Wedding (Danielle Dax album) =

Compilation album by Danielle Dax
- Released: 1 November 1987
- Studios: Alaska Studio in London; Greenhouse Studio, London
- Genres: Avant-pop, art rock, experimental music
- Labels: Awesome Records (London); VAP (Japan)
- Producer: Danielle Dax

Danielle Dax chronology
Inky Bloaters (1987)	The Chemical Wedding (1987)	The Janice Long Session EP (1988)

The Chemical Wedding is a compilation album by Danielle Dax released exclusively in Japan in November 1987, containing rare and previously unreleased songs.

Eight songs are included on this album, four of which had been previously released as B-sides to singles from Inky Bloaters, while the other four songs had not been released in the U.K. before. Of the four previously unreleased songs, three would appear the following year on the U.S. compilation album Dark Adapted Eye in the form of new mixes/masters and even a new recording.

== Track listing ==
All tracks are written by Danielle Dax.

No.	Title	Single	Length
1.	"Touch Piggy's Eyes"	Previously unreleased; later released as the B-side of "Cat-House" (UK 12")	4:48
2.	"Whistling for His Love"	Previously unreleased; later remixed and released as the B-side of "White Knuckle Ride" (U.K. 7" & 12") and "Cat-House" (U.S. 12")	3:35
3.	"Olamal" (Instrumental)	Previously unreleased	1:29
4.	"Muzzles"	"Big Hollow Man" (7" & 12")	3:22
5.	"Cat-House"	Previously unreleased; later re-recorded and released as a single in 1988 (UK) and 1989 (U.S.)	4:03
6.	"Up in Arms"	"Where the Flies Are" (12")	3:01
7.	"When I Was Young"	"Where the Flies Are" (7" & 12")	4:04
8.	"The Passing of the Third Floor Back" (Instrumental)	Different recording/mix than on "Big Hollow Man" (12")	2:53

Note: The songs "Touch Piggy's Eyes," "Whistling for His Love," "Cat-House" (re-recorded version), and "When I Was Young" were later included on the 1988 U.S. compilation Dark Adapted Eye. All eight songs were included on the 1995 U.K. compilation Comatose-Non-Reaction ("Cat-House" and "Whistling" are the re-recorded/remixed versions). Some songs had the mixdown tapes deliberately sped up during mastering for inclusion on later releases; "Touch Piggy's Eyes" and "When I Was Young" on Comatose are 4:05 and 3:48 respectively as a result.

== Credits ==
Music and arrangements by Danielle Dax and David Knight.
Lyrics by Danielle Dax.
Recorded at Fortress Dax; additional recording and mixing at Alaska Studios and Greenhouse Studios.

- Danielle Dax - Vocals, keyboards, guitar, saxophone, percussion, producer, initial recording, cover artwork
- Karl Blake - Guitar
- Pete Farrugia - Guitar
- David Knight - Guitar, percussion, keyboards, tape
- Trevor Reidy - Drums
- Chad Strentz - Harmonica
- Ian Sturgess - Bass guitar
- Iain O'Higgins - Recording and mixing engineer
- Jessica Corcoran - Assistant engineer
