= Cat-House (song) =

- U.K. 12-inch single cover

Single by Danielle Dax

from the album Dark Adapted Eye
- B-side: "House-Cat"
- Released: April 1988
- Recorded: 1987
- Studio: Fortress Dax
- Genre: Indie rock; synth pop
- Length: 4:01 (1987 version); 3:30 (1988 version)
- Songwriters: Danielle Dax; David Knight
- Producer: Danielle Dax

Danielle Dax singles chronology
"Big Hollow Man" (1987)	"Cat-House" (1988)	"White Knuckle Ride" (1989)

Music video
- "Cat House" on YouTube

"Cat-House" is a song written and recorded by Danielle Dax and released as a single in 1988. The song was first included on the 1987 compilation album The Chemical Wedding before being re-recorded in 1988 and included on Dark Adapted Eye.

The single reached the Top 10 of the UK Independent Singles chart and also appeared on the Modern Rock and Dance charts in the United States.

== Background ==
An early version of "Cat-House" was released on the compilation album The Chemical Wedding in November 1987 exclusively in Japan. This version has not appeared on any other album releases to date.

"Cat-House" was re-recorded in 1988 and released as a standalone single in the United Kingdom on Awesome Records. The 7-inch single included an instrumental song "House-Cat" on the B-side, while the 12-inch single additionally included the song "Touch Piggy's Eyes", which, like "Cat-House", had first appeared on The Chemical Wedding before being reworked in 1988.

The 1988 version of "Cat-House", along with its b-sides "House-Cat" and "Touch Piggy's Eyes", appeared on the compilation album Dark Adapted Eye, which served as Dax's debut album release in the United States and was released through Sire records. The promote the album release, a promotional 12-inch release was issued containing both "Cat-House" and Dax's previous single "Big Hollow Man". A retail 12-inch single was released later in February 1989 in the United States. This release included a new "Overnight Mix" of Cat-House, as well as a non-album song "Cold Sweat" and a remixed version of "White Knuckle Ride". The "Overnight Mix" remained unreleased on CD until the 2019 remastered edition of Dark Adapted Eye released by Rubellan Remasters.

The single version of "Cat-House" was included on Dax's 1995 compilation album Comatose-Non-Reaction: The Thwarted Pop Career of Danielle Dax.

== Reception ==
The single "Cat-House" was described by Billboard magazine as "Pile-driving dance-rock [radiating] with energy", and complimented the "warped, acid house" B-side "Cold Sweat". Music Week also praised the song, and called it "an impressive new track built on a rampaging rock rhythm" and featured "some manic guitar behind its catchy vocal".

== Track listings ==
U.K. 7" (April 1988) – Awesome Records AOR 12

1. "Cat-House" (Single version) – 3:30
2. "House-Cat" – 3:31

U.K. 12" (April 1988) – Awesome Records AOR 12T

1. "Cat-House" (Single version) – 3:30
2. "Touch Piggy's Eyes" (Single version) – 4:35
3. "House-Cat" – 3:31

U.S. 12" Promo (November 1988) – Sire PRO–A–3330

1. "Cat-House" (Single version) – 3:30
2. "Big Hollow Man" (Remix) – 4:48

U.S. 12" (February 1989) – Sire 9 21128-0

1. "Cat-House" (Single version) – 3:30
2. "White Knuckle Ride" (Remix) – 2:47
3. "Cold Sweat" – 6:01
4. "Cat-House" (Overnight Mix) – 5:00

== Charts ==
Chart (1988–1989)	Peak position
UK Indie Chart (MRIB)	3
UK Indie Chart (Music Week)	10
US Dance Club Songs (Billboard) "Cat-House" / "Cold Sweat"	27
US Modern Rock Tracks (Billboard)	19

== Cover versions ==
- In 1989, the Finnish model and artist Kata Kärkkäinen recorded a version of the song for her Your Love album.
- The Damned included "Cat-House" occasionally in their live repertoire.
