= Danielle Dax =

English experimental musician (born 1958)

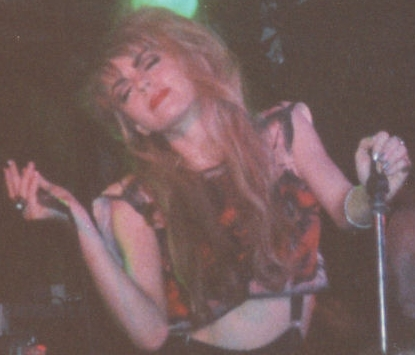
- Dax in 1989

Background information
- Born: Danielle Gardner; 23 September 1958 (age 68); Southend-on-Sea, Essex, England
- Genres: Experimental rock; post-punk; gothic rock; avant-pop
- Occupations: Musician; music producer; artist
- Instruments: Vocals; guitar; drums; saxophone; piano; flute; keyboards
- Labels: Sire; Awesome; Initial
- Formerly of: Lemon Kittens
- Website: danielledax.com

Danielle Gardner (born 23 September 1958), known professionally as Danielle Dax, is an English rock musician, music producer, and artist most active from the late-1970s to the mid-1990s.

== Early life ==
She was born Danielle Gardner, in Southend-on-Sea, Essex, England. Dax's first performance on stage in London was when she was a child. She sang in Benjamin Britten's opera, Noye's Fludde (Noah's Flood), at the Royal Albert Hall. Preceding this, the first time Dax appeared on stage was at the age of three as an orange Jelly Baby on the Southend bandstand. After a short modelling career (she won the "Miss Evening Echo" competition in 1976), she turned to music.

== Career ==
Dax made her popular music debut in 1979, within three weeks of joining the group Amii Toytal and the Croixroads (a pseudonym for Lemon Kittens) as keyboardist, flutist and saxophonist. It was their first gig and took place at Reading University's Student Union Airport Bar. Karl Blake from Lemon Kittens had met her some three weeks earlier after he read an article about her in a local newspaper. Blake was in urgent need of an artist, so he attended the next meeting of Dax's arts group and was introduced to her. Upon learning that she could also play saxophone and flute, he immediately recruited her for the band; in addition, he also got her to agree to do the cover artwork for the planned release. She ended up doing the cover artwork for all of Lemon Kittens releases.

During Dax's time in the avant-garde new wave music band Lemon Kittens, she was included on Robert Fripp's band The League of Gentlemen's 1981 eponymous album, performing vocals (credited as "Hamsprachtmusic") on the song "Minor Man". However, that song was not included on the album when it was released on the CD compilation entitled God Save The King. Her artwork was retained for the cover. She also painted the cover for Robert Fripp's solo album, Let the Power Fall. Dax supplied vocals to an unreleased track by the Bombay Ducks in which she sang a duet with Robert Wyatt, although they never met. The duet was done in studio, separately.

In early 1982, after the Lemon Kittens went into "extended hibernation", Dax embarked on her solo career, recording and producing the albums Pop-Eyes (1983) wherein she played all the instruments herself, initially released on the IRC [Initial Recording Company] label with her own art cover, and re-released on Awesome Records with a Holly Warburton cover. On the mini-album that followed Jesus Egg That Wept (1984), she was aided on some tracks by Karl Blake or David Knight. Her third album Inky Bloaters (1987), cemented her collaborative recording work with David Knight; this as well as various EPs, up to that time, were released on the label Awesome Records. In 1988, she signed with Sire Records, which released her album Dark Adapted Eye, which contained material from her previous recordings.

In 1984, she made her first film appearance as the Wolfgirl (a non-speaking role) in The Company of Wolves by Neil Jordan. In 1988, her film credits came to include writing music for the short avant-garde film Axel by Nigel Wingrove.

In 1989, Dax appeared on the Channel 4 show Star Test.

In 1990, she released her one major-label studio album, Blast the Human Flower, produced by Stephen Street, except for the tracks "Bayou" and "Daisy", which they produced together. The album's single, "Tomorrow Never Knows", joined "Blue Christmas" (her cover of an Elvis Presley tune), "Kites" by Simon Dupree and the Big Sound (during the Lemon Kittens period) and "Hate on Sight", a track by Shock Headed Peters (included on her Comatose etc. release) as an addition to her covers of other artists' work. Her last two album releases were in 1995 and consisted of a career retrospective double-album entitled Comatose Non-Reaction: The Thwarted Pop Career of Danielle Dax and an EP of new avant-garde and almost completely instrumental material called Timber Tongue (both on her own Biter of Thorpe label). Dax's career in the music business then went on indefinite hiatus and is often referred to as a retirement.

Since 1996, she has worked in interior design and has appeared several times on the BBC interior design show Homefront, where she won the Designer of the Year Award.

In 2017, Dax performed at London's Cafe Oto as part of UnicaZürn with David Knight, David J. Smith and Stephen Thrower. She had previously contributed lyrics, vocals and artwork for the group's 2009 album Temporal Bends.

On 4 November 2022, a new single was released by Danielle Dax titled "Invictus Arduis". The single was released on transparent vinyl by the independent label Heaven's Lathe. One hundred copies were printed and sold out within two minutes. The project was made with her longtime collaborator David Knight, and featured experimental instrumentation by Dax and Knight and a singing and spoken word by Dax. Lyrics from the previously released songs "Cutting The Last Sheaf", "Born To Be Bad" and "Whistling For His Love" have been used for the project. This is the first newly released material in 27 years, since the release of the Timber Tongue EP in 1995.

== Discography ==
=== with Lemon Kittens ===
- Spoonfed & Writhing (cover art only)
- We Buy a Hammer for Daddy (multi-instrumentalist, vocals)
- Cake Beast (three track 12" EP)
- (...those that bite the hand that feeds them sooner or later must meet...) The Big Dentist (multi-instrumentalist, vocals)

=== Solo ===
==== Studio albums ====
Title	Album details	UK Indie Chart Peak
Pop-Eyes	Released: 22 April 1983; Label: The Initial Recording Company	—
Jesus Egg That Wept	Released: 12 November 1984; Label: Awesome	10
Inky Bloaters	Released: 1 April 1987; Label: Awesome	9
Blast the Human Flower	Released: November 1990; Label: Sire Records	—
"—" denotes releases that did not chart or that the album was not released on that market.

==== EPs ====
Title	Album details	UK Indie Chart Peak
The Janice Long Session	Released: March 1988; Label: Awesome	24
Timber Tongue	Released: 1995; Label: Biter of Thorpe	?
Invictus Arduis	Released: 4 November 2022; Label: Heaven's Lathe	—
"—" denotes releases that did not chart or that the album was not released on that market.

==== Compilations ====
Title	Album details
Up Amongst the Golden Spires	Released: 21 October 1986 (Japan); Label: Vap Inc.
The Chemical Wedding	Released: 1 November 1987 (Japan); Label: Vap Inc.
Dark Adapted Eye	Released: November 1988; Label: Sire
Comatose-Non-Reaction (The Thwarted Pop Career of Danielle Dax)	Released: 1995; Label: Biter of Thorpe

==== Singles ====
Title	Year	UK Indie Chart	US Modern Rock	US Dance Club	Album
"Yummer Yummer Man"	1985	7	—	—	Inky Bloaters
"Where the Flies Are"	1986	14	—	—	Inky Bloaters
"Big Hollow Man"	1987	4	—	—	Inky Bloaters
"Cat-House" (Note: Charted as a Double A-side with "Cold Sweat" on the Dance Club Songs chart.)	1988	3	19	27	Dark Adapted Eye
"White Knuckle Ride"	1989	5	—	—	Dark Adapted Eye
"Tomorrow Never Knows"	1990	—	5	—	Blast the Human Flower
"Big Blue '82'"	1991	—	—	—	Blast the Human Flower
"—" denotes releases that did not chart or that the single was not released on that market.

==== Promotional singles ====
Title	Year	Country	Album
"Inky Bloaters"	1987	Japan	Inky Bloaters
"Cat-House" / "Big Hollow Man"	1988	United States	Dark Adapted Eye
"Whistling for His Love"	1989	United States	Dark Adapted Eye

=== Cover versions ===
- In 1989, the Finnish model and artist Kata Kärkkäinen recorded a version of the single "Cat House" for her Your Love album.
- The Damned also included "Cat House" occasionally in their live repertoire.
