= Karl Blake =

English musician

Karl Blake (born 1956 in Reading, Berkshire, England) is a vocalist, bassist, guitarist and multi-instrumentalist. Most of his own music can be described as progressive-experimental and sometimes psychedelic.

== Musical career ==
Blake is most noted, in addition to his solo work, for his work with Lemon Kittens, Danielle Dax, Shock Headed Peters, Sol Invictus, Current 93, Left Hand Right Hand, Seven Pines and Gaë Bolg and the Church of Fand. Other past projects include Alternative TV, The Underneath, Evil Twin, British Racing Green and various other solo and session work.

He began playing and self-recording in 1973/4, and his first band to have a commercially released record, Lemon Kittens, was formed by Blake and Gary Thatcher on 5 April 1978. It went through numerous line-up changes before it again became a two-piece group consisting of Blake and Danielle Dax, with the addition of others for live performance (the group only played around 22 concerts during their entire existence). Between 1979 and 1981, Lemon Kittens released two albums as well as two EPs, described by Simon Reynolds as "aggressively absurdist records". Cassette-only Lemon Kittens recordings were made under the name Gland Shrouds in 1980.

Blake also released solo cassettes, including Tank Death and The New Pollution. In 1982 he formed Shock Headed Peters with Ashley Wales, eventually adding Dave Knight, then Mark Rowlatt and Clive Glover . In 1986 he started The Underneath, a solo project, releasing an EP and an album featuring various guests. Shock Headed Peters disbanded in October 1987 before reforming in 1990, again with founder-members Blake and Knight. In 1987, weeks after Shock Headed Peters' first disbanding, Evil Twin and British Racing Green were formed. Evil Twin was Karl Blake and David Mellor, with the addition of guest vocalist Amy Rodenberg. They recorded one album, The Black Spot, between 1987 and 1991. Both groups are dormant since the early 1990s.

Blake toured extensively and recorded with Left Hand Right Hand from 1988 until 2004. In 2005 Blake split with Sol Invictus, the group he had long been associated with through studio recordings and live appearances, and denounced both the group and the neofolk genre for, in his view, right wing leanings. At present, Blake plays (live only) for Gaë Bolg and the Church of Fand and also for Seven Pines. The instrumental track Zoé on the Seven Pines CD Le Cri (2006) was in fact written and performed by Blake on the spot and, unknown to him, orchestrated and released by the leader of Gaë Bolg, Eric Roger. It is one of the last recorded pieces by Blake to be released to date.

== Discography ==
=== As composer/songwriter ===
==== Solo work ====
- Tank Death (cassette, 1977–9), Daark Inc.
- The New Pollution (1977–9), Darrk Inc.
- The Prehensile Tales (Compilation) (1983), Normal Records
- Mandibles: Thirty Pieces of Silver (cassette, 1992), Tak Tak Tak
- Paper-Thin Religion: Solo Archives 1977-1981 (1993?), Pro-Evil Pro-Devil
- Mandibles: En Route to Toothless (1995) Swordex Hieroglyph Proper
- ON: The World and Everything in it (Compilation, contributing track) (CD, 1996)

==== Gland Shrouds ====
- Staff in Confidence/Toyshop Universal (1980), Daark Inc.
- Animal Dance (1980), Daark Inc.
- Your Animals (1980), Daark Inc.
- Everyone Wants to Win (1980), Daark Inc.
- Fortune Cheats (1980), Detrimental History Sound Series
- A Telescope in the Sky (1980), Detrimental History Sound Series

==== Homunculus ====
- Morgue Dreams (1979), Detrimental History Sound Series

==== Lemon Kittens ====
- Spoonfed and Writhing (EP, 1979), Step Forward
- We Buy a Hammer for Daddy (LP, 1980), United Dairies
- Cake Beast (EP, 1980), United Dairies
- (Those who bite the hand that feeds them sooner or later must meet) The Big Dentist (LP, 1981), Illuminated

==== Shock Headed Peters ====
- I, Bloodbrother Be (EP and single, 1984), el
- The Kissing of Gods (EP and single, 1985), el
- Not Born Beautiful (LP, 1985), el
- Life Extinguisher (EP, 1986), Beach Culture
- Fear Engine (LP, 1987), Produkt Korps
- Several Headed Enemy (CD, 1992), Cyclops Prod
- Fear Engine II – Almost As If It Had Never Happened (CD, 1993), Cyclops Prod
- Tendercide (CD, 1996), Cyclops Prod
- Not alone (Compilation, contributing track) (2006)

==== The Underneath ====
- The Imp of the Perverse (EP, 1986), el
- Lunatic Dawn of the Dismantler (LP, and CD in Japan only, 1987), el

==== Evil Twin ====
- The Black Spot (CD, 1992), Livesey
- The Lamp of the Invisible Light (Compilation, contributing track) (1992)

=== Collaborations as session and live musician ===
==== With Sol Invictus/Tony Wakeford ====
- In the Jaws of the Serpent (Live album) (LP, 1989)
- Lex Talionis (1989)
- Nurse With Wound · Sol Invictus · Current 93 (Split 12", 1989)
- Trees in Winter (1990)
- The Killing Tide (1990)
- See the Dove Fall (7", 1990)
- King & Queen (CD, 1992)
- In the Rain (CD, 1995)
- Cupid & Death (Tony Wakeford solo album) (CD, 1995)
- The Blade (1997)
- In Europa (Radio live session album) (CD, 1998)
- In a Garden Green (CD, 1999)
- The Hill of Crosses (2000)
- Brugge (Live album) (CD, 2001)
- Thrones (2002)
- The Devil's Steed (CD, 2005)

==== With Current 93 ====
- Thunder Perfect Mind (1992)
- Hitler as Kalki (Live album) (CD, 1993)
- All Dolled Up Like Christ (Live album) (CD, 1999)
- Cats Drunk on Copper (Live album) (CD, 2001)

==== With Left Hand Right Hand ====
- Humdrum (1990)
- Legs Akimbo (CD, 1992)
- Rise and Fall (7", 1994)
- In Mufti (CD, 1995)

==== Various ====
- Danielle Dax: Jesus Egg That Wept (1984)
- Chrystal Belle Scrodd (Diana Rogerson): The Inevitable Chrystal Belle Scrodd Record (1985)
- Nurse With Wound: The Sylvie and Babs Hi-Fi Companion (1985)
- In The Nursery: Anatomy of a Poet (CD, 1994)
- Andrew King: The Bitter Harvest (CD, 1998)
- Joolie Wood: Tales of Colour and White (Maxi CD, 2006)
- Simon Finn: Accidental Life (CD, 2007)
- Andrew Liles: Ouarda (The Subtle Art of Phyllorhodomancy) (2008)
