= Sol Invictus (band) =

British neofolk band

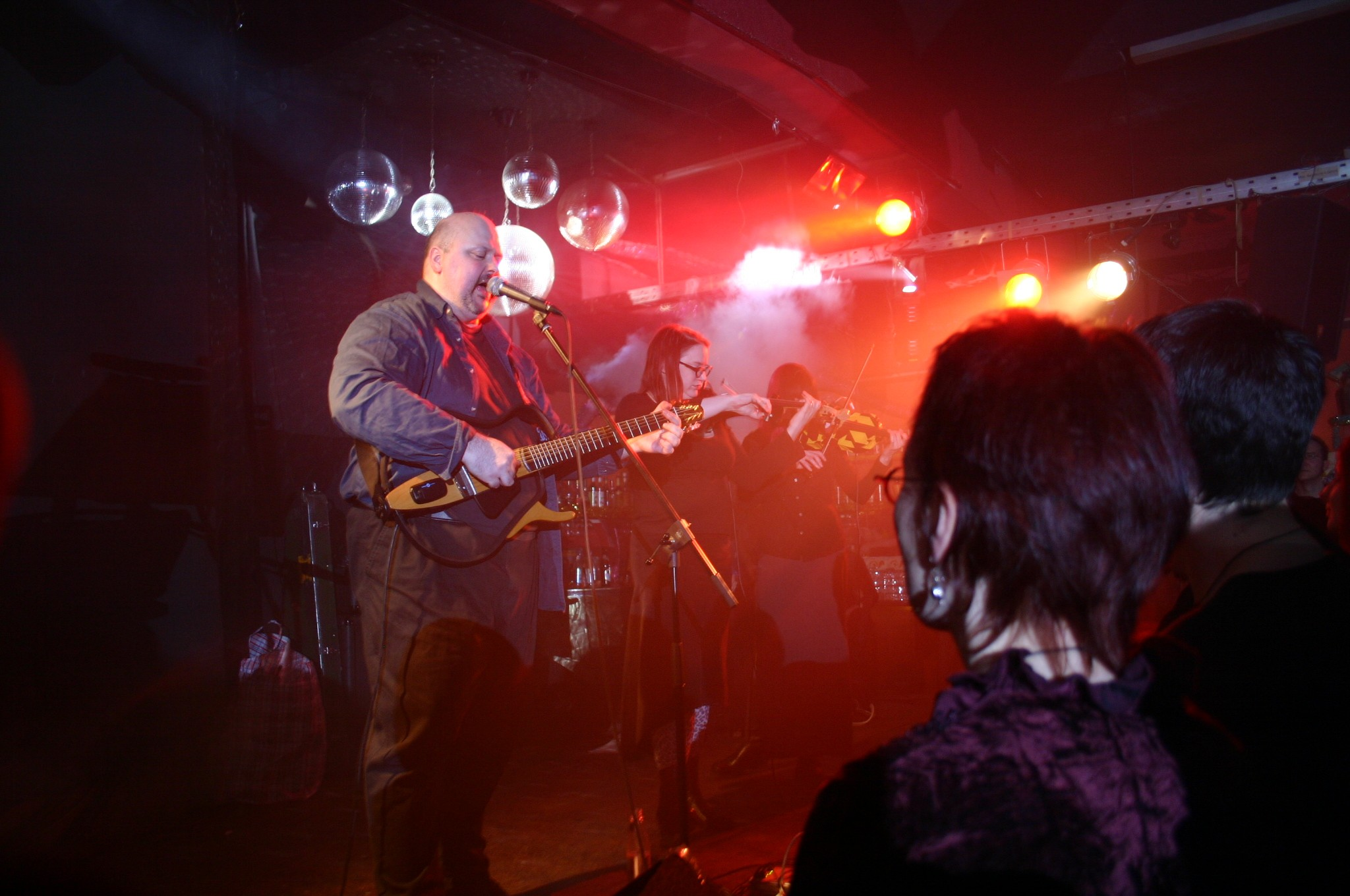
- Sol Invictus in 2005

Background information
- Origin: London, England
- Genres: Neofolk
- Years active: 1987–2023
- Label: Tursa
- Spinoffs: Fire + Ice
- Spinoff of: Crisis; Death in June; Above the Ruins
- Members: Tony Wakeford; Renee Rosen; Caroline Jago; Lesley Malone; Eilish McCraken
- Past members: Ian Read; Liz Gray; Gary Smith; Karl Blake; Leithana; Eric Rodgers; Sarah Bradshaw; Nick Hall; Céline Marleix-Bardeau; Nathalie Van Keymeulen; David Mellor; Andrew King; Guy Harries; M Lloyd James
- Website: sol-invictus.bandcamp.com

Sol Invictus were a British neofolk band formed by Tony Wakeford in 1987. Wakeford had been the sole constant member of the group since its inception, although numerous musicians have contributed and collaborated with him under the Sol Invictus name over the years.

== History ==
Prior to forming Sol Invictus, Tony Wakeford had co-founded the band Death in June. In early 1984, Wakeford had been a supporter of the National Front (UK), and was fired from Death in June for "bringing his 'right-wing leanings into the group'. Subsequently, he formed Above the Ruins, a post-punk band which became controversial due to its association with right-wing politics. In 1987, Wakeford distanced himself from these views, and formed Sol Invictus, adapting the band's name from a cult that predated Christianity. In 1990, Wakeford formed his own record label, Tursa. With distribution by World Serpent Distribution, Tursa released numerous albums by Sol Invictus, starting with Trees in Winter. After World Serpent dissolved in the 2000s, Cold Spring began distributing the band's albums.

Due to Wakeford's past political associations, Sol Invictus has been accused of neo-fascism. Wakeford initially denied ever having been a member of the National Front or Above the Ruins, but later admitted to having been a member of both. In 2007, Wakeford described his National Front membership as "probably the worst decision of my life".

== Musical style ==
According to AllMusic biographer Paul Simpson, "Sol Invictus is one of the most prolific and influential bands associated with neo-folk or apocalyptic folk". The band's music combines acoustic guitar playing and "neo-classical instrumentation" with elements of industrial music. Tony Wakeford uses the phrase "folk noir" to describe his music. Sol Invictus' debut album, Against the Modern World (1988), displayed a post-punk sound which incorporated elements of what was later termed martial industrial. According to Peter Webb, the band's first four albums use a "very raw and basic" sound consisting of acoustic guitar, electric guitar, bass guitar, keyboards and drums which "evoke a premodern world that deals with a variety of subject matter from paganism, to England's quirkiness, to anti-Americanism, and looking to the traditions of Europe." The band had considerable interest in heathen and Mithraist themes, often with an explicit antipathy to Christianity, reflecting the involvement of Wakeford and other members in neopagan groups. The band's lyrics display a pessimistic, apathetic view towards modern society. Their later albums are marked by more personal lyrical themes, and expand their sound with cello, violin, orchestral drums, flute, and harp.

== Discography ==
Year	Title	Format, special notes
1987	Against the Modern World	Mini-LP
1989	In the Jaws of the Serpent	Live LP
1989	Lex Talionis	Part of box set with Current 93 and Nurse with Wound
1989	Fields	12" with Current 93 and Nurse With Wound
1990	Sol Veritas Lux	CD
1990	Abattoirs of Love	7"
1990	Lex Talionis	CD
1990	Trees in Winter	CD/LP
1991	The Killing Tide	CD/LP
1992	Death in June/Current 93/Sol Invictus	Live CD with Death in June and Current 93
1992	Looking for Europe	7"
1992	The Lamp of the Invisible Light	7" compilation track
1992	Somewhere in Europe/See the Dove Fall	7"
1992	Let Us Prey	Live CD
1992	King & Queen	CD
1994	The Death of the West	CD
1994	Black Europe	Live CD
1995	In the Rain	CD
1997	The Blade	CD
1998	In Europa	Live CD
1998	All Things Strange and Rare	Compilation CD
1999	In a Garden Green	CD
2000	Trieste	Live CD
2000	The Hill of Crosses	CD
2000	Eve	7"
2001	Brugge	Live concert, 1996-02-03
2002	Thrones	CD
2003	The Giddy Whirls of Centuries	Compilation CD
2004	The Angel	Compilation CD
2005	The Devil's Steed	CD
2006	Walking in the Rain on the Ostrow Tumski	Compilation CD
2010	The Bad Luck Bird/Stella Maris	7"
2011	The Cruellest Month	CD (Studio album)
2014	Once Upon a Time	CD (Studio album)
2017	Ghostly Whistlings	Compilation 10"
2018	Necropolis	CD (Studio album)
