= Star Test (TV series) =

- Title card
- Genre: Chat show
- Presented by: Kara Noble
- Country of origin: United Kingdom
- Original language: English
- No. of series: 3
- No. of episodes: 47

Original release
- Network: Channel 4
- Release: 4 April 1989 – 17 March 1991

Star Test is a British TV programme that ran from 4 April 1989 to 17 March 1991 on Channel 4. The show took an interview format, in which the guest "star" was seated facing directly to camera, questioned by an unseen voice (Kara Noble). The topics discussed were chosen from an on-screen menu, after which the interviewee selected questions by number from an unseen list. The show was lampooned in two British comedy sketch shows; French and Saunders and Bo' Selecta!, the latter being some 12 years after Star Test ended.

== Interviewees ==
Roland Gift of pop band Fine Young Cannibals was the show's first guest. Other guests included Clint Boon, Peter Gabriel, Bernard Sumner, Craig Charles, Robert Palmer, Stephen Fry, Kenny Everett, Tony Slattery, Garry Bushell, Kim Wilde, Julian Cope, Richard E. Grant, Matt Goss, Luke Goss, Julian Clary, Terence Trent D'Arby, Wayne Hussey, Danielle Dax, Ken Russell, Wendy James, Hazell Dean, Paddy Ashdown, Siobhan Fahey and Tony James.

== Transmissions ==
=== Series ===
Series	Start date	End date	Episodes
1	4 April 1989	12 September 1989	24
2	4 May 1990	17 August 1990	13
3	13 January 1991	17 March 1991	10

=== Episodes ===
No.	Guest	Date
1	Roland Gift	4 April 1989
2	Wendy James	11 April 1989
3	Craig Charles	18 April 1989
4	Tony James	25 April 1989
5	Kim Wilde	2 May 1989
6	Natalie Cole	9 May 1989
7	Linford Christie	16 May 1989
8	Kenny Everett	23 May 1989
9	Sam Brown	30 May 1989
10	Robert Palmer	6 June 1989
11	Julian Cope	13 June 1989
12	Malcolm Mclaren	20 June 1989
13	Peter Gabriel	27 June 1989
14	Danielle Dax	4 July 1989
15	Courtney Pine	11 July 1989
16	John Gordon-Sinclair	18 July 1989
17	Siobhan Fahey	25 July 1989
18	Luke Goss	1 August 1989
19	Matt Goss	8 August 1989
20	Richard E.Grant	15 August 1989
21	Martin Fry	22 August 1989
22	Robert Elms	29 August 1989
23	Ken Russell	5 September 1989
24	Nigel Kennedy	12 September 1989
25	TBC	4 May 1990
26	Terence Trent D'Arby	11 May 1990
27	TBC	18 May 1990
28	TBC	25 May 1990
29	TBC	1 June 1990
30	Paul Heaton	4 May 1990
31	TBC	15 May 1990
32	Bob Geldof	22 June 1990
33	Sydney Youngblood	29 June 1990
34	Margi Clarke	27 June 1990
35	Dave Stewart	3 August 1990
36	Stephen Fry	10 August 1990
37	Love and Passion Special	17 August 1990
38	Julian Clary	13 January 1991
39	Betty Boo	20 January 1991
40	Michelle Collins	3 February 1991
41	Chris Eubank	17 February 1991
42	Clint Boon	13 March 1991
43	Bernard Sumner	10 March 1991
44	Gary Bushell	17 March 1991
