= Tony Wakeford =

British musician

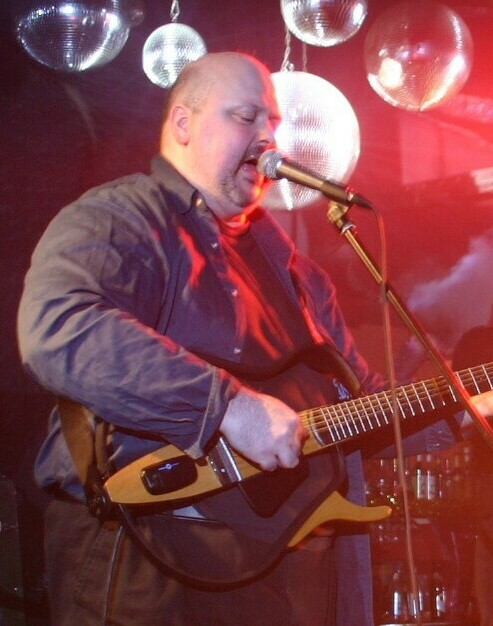
- Wakeford with Sol Invictus in 2005

Background information
- Birth name: Anthony Charles Wakeford
- Born: 2 May 1959 (age 65); Woking, Surrey, England
- Genres: Neofolk; post-punk; punk rock
- Occupations: Musician; songwriter
- Instruments: Bass; guitar; vocals; keyboards
- Years active: 1977–present
- Member of: Sol Invictus; Crisis
- Formerly of: Death in June; Above the Ruins; Current 93; Orchestra Noir; The Wardrobe

Anthony Charles Wakeford (born 2 May 1959) is a British neofolk musician, who primarily records under the name Sol Invictus. He is also a member of the punk rock band Crisis and a co-founder of Death in June.

== Biography ==
=== Early work ===
Wakeford was the bassist for the English punk rock band Crisis. An openly left-wing and anti-fascist band, Crisis performed at events organized by Rock Against Racism and the Anti-Nazi League. Crisis disbanded in 1980, but Wakeford later began touring with a new line-up of the band in 2017. Wakeford, Crisis guitarist Douglas Pearce and Patrick Leagas co-founded the band Death in June. In early 1984, Wakeford was fired from Death in June for "bringing his 'right-wing leanings into the group'"; at the time he had been a member of the National Front (UK). In 2007, Wakeford described his National Front membership as "probably the worst decision of my life". Wakeford had also been a member of the Odinic Rite, a neopagan organization. After being fired from Death in June, Wakeford formed the post-punk band Above the Ruins, and in October 1984, they released a nine song demo album on cassette, Songs of the Wolf, which was distributed through the London-based P.O. box BCM Grimnir, and from the National Front bookshop in Croydon. The band's lyrics denounced communism, capitalism and liberalism. The demo received a favorable review from Nationalism Today, the journal of the National Front. The following year, Above the Ruins contributed the song "The Killing Zone" to No Surrender, a compilation of recordings by white nationalist bands, and in late 1985, announced that their demo would be "soon to be available on record".

=== Sol Invictus ===
In 1987, Wakeford distanced himself from right-wing views, and formed the neofolk band Sol Invictus, adapting the band's name from a cult that predated Christianity. The band's music combines acoustic guitar playing and "neo-classical instrumentation" with elements of industrial music. Due to Wakeford's past political associations, Sol Invictus has been accused of neo-fascism.

In 1990, Wakeford formed his own record label, Tursa. With distribution by World Serpent Distribution, Tursa released numerous albums by Sol Invictus, starting with Trees in Winter. After World Serpent dissolved in the 2000s, Cold Spring began distributing the band's albums.

== Discography ==
Year	Title	Format, special notes	Artist
1984	Songs of the Wolf	Cassette/CD	Above the Ruins
1987	Imperium	LP (reissued on CD, 2001)	Current 93
1987	Christ and the Pale Queens Mighty in Sorrow	2xLP (reissued on CD, 1994)	Current 93
1988	Earth Covers Earth	LP (reissued on CD, 1992) (limited LP reissue, 2005)	Current 93
1989	Music, Martinis and Misanthopy	LP/CD	Boyd Rice and Friends
1989	Cooloorta Moon	12"	Nurse With Wound
1989	Crooked Crosses for the Nodding God	CD	Current 93
1990	Looney Runes	LP, CD 1992	Current 93
1990	Horse	LP (reissued on CD as Horsey with extra/reworked tracks, 1997)	Current 93
1991	Creakiness	12"	Nurse With Wound/Spasm
1992	Soresucker	12"/CD	Nurse With Wound
1992	Revenge of the Selfish Shellfish	CD	Wakeford/Stapleton
1993	La Croix	CD	Tony Wakeford
1994	Above us the Sun	CD	Tony Wakeford
1994	Summer Ends	7" (live tracks later included on Paris CD)	Tony Wakeford
1996	Cupid & Death	CD	Tony Wakeford
1996	Cantos	CD	L'Orchestre Noir
1998	Autumn Calls	CD	Wakeford/Tor Lundvall
1998	Eleven	CD	L'Orchestre Noir
1998	Believe Me	CD	Tony Wakeford
2000	Three Nine	CD	Howden/Wakeford
2002	Paris	CD (live concert recording)	Tony Wakeford
2003	Wormwood	CD	Howden/Wakeford
2004	The Murky Brine	CD	HaWthorn (Howden/Wakeford)
2005	Cups in Cupboard	CD	The Wardrobe (Andrew Liles & Tony Wakeford)
2005	Marseilles	CD (live concert recording)	Duo Noir (Matt Howden & Tony Wakeford)
2006	A Sandwich Short	CD	The Wardrobe (Andrew Liles & Tony Wakeford)
2007	Into The Woods	CD	Tony Wakeford
2008	Marble Heart	CD	Grey Force Wakeford (Nick Grey, Kris Force & Tony Wakeford)
2008	Ghosts	CD	Triple Tree (Andrew King & Tony Wakeford)
2008	The Affordable Holmes EP	CD	Orchestra Noir
2008	Lucifer Before Sunrise	7"	The Wardrobe
2009	Not All of Me Will Die	CD released by The Eastern Front label, Israel	Tony Wakeford
2011	Oddities	CD	Tony Wakeford
