= Lemon Kittens =

English post-punk band

Lemon Kittens are a post-punk band, formed in Reading, Berkshire, England in 1977, by Karl Blake and Gary Thatcher. Band members frequently changed, and included Danielle Dax and Mark Perry.

== Discography ==
=== LPs ===
- We Buy a Hammer for Daddy (1980, United Dairies) (CD reissue, Biter Of Thorpe, 1993)
- (Those Who Bite The Hand That Feeds Them Sooner Or Later Must Meet The) Big Dentist (1982, Illuminated Records) (CD reissue, Biter Of Thorpe, 1994)

=== Singles and EPs ===
- Spoonfed & Writhing (1979, Step-Forward Records 7" EP) reissued with three extra tracks on CD in 1996
- Cake Beast (1980, United Dairies, 12" EP)

The Spoonfed & Writhing EP has gained a re-release, as part of the Step Forward-I Wanna Punk Rock: The Singles Collection, in either CD or vinyl boxed set (Castle Records B000PMG5PC).

=== Compilations ===
Tracks by Lemon Kittens appear on the compilation albums Snatch 2, Hoisting the Black Flag, Perspectives and Distortion, The Wonderful World of Glass vol 1, and Terra Serpentes.
