= World Serpent Distribution =

World Serpent
- Founded: 1990
- Founder: David Gibson; Alan Trench; Alison Webster
- Status: inactive
- Distributor: World Trade
- Genre: Experimental
- Country of origin: United Kingdom
- Location: London

World Serpent Distribution was a British record label and music distribution house formed in the 1990s by David Gibson, Alan Trench and Alison Webster. Douglas Pearce of Death In June coined the company name in 1991, World Serpent being another name for Jörmungandr.

== Early history ==
World Serpent was well known for distributing music by many post-industrial, apocalyptic folk, neofolk, avant-garde and otherwise esoteric or experimental artists, including Death In June, Current 93, Sol Invictus, Coil, Nurse With Wound, Boyd Rice, Ralph Gean, Zone, Elijah's Mantle, Orchis, and Ozymandias. Many of these artists also ended up collaborating with or being influenced by one another, causing the World Serpent name to become synonymous with many of the artists and labels distributed through the company during the early 1990s.

Due to early CDs being manufactured at Philips-Dupont Optical's UK pressing plant, World Serpent releases from the late 1980s and early 1990s were significantly affected by Compact Disc bronzing.

== Bankruptcy ==
Following a long period of rumours, Boyd Rice left World Serpent Distribution. He was followed shortly thereafter by Douglas Pearce, Richard Leviathan and Albin Julius. Subsequently, fewer and fewer releases began to be distributed by World Serpent, leading to much fan speculation. In October 2002, a claim filed by Pearce in 2000 was successfully settled out of court, resulting in Pearce receiving unpaid royalties from the Court Funds Office. Pearce also gave back his shares in the company he had helped form, but was no longer interested in or affiliated to. Founder Alan Trench left World Serpent Distribution at the end of 2003. It was confirmed in August 2004 that World Serpent Distribution was no longer operating and had gone bankrupt. Many artists distributed through World Serpent, such as Chris and Cosey, had not been informed by the company and may still be owed past dues.
