= Neofolk =

Music genre

- Other names: Apocalyptic folk (early)
- Stylistic origins: Folk; dark wave; dark ambient; post-punk; traditional folk music; experimental; post-industrial
- Cultural origins: 1980s, England
- Derivative forms: Martial industrial

Other topics
- Anti-folk; folk punk; freak folk; gothic country; neopagan music; neoclassical darkwave

Neofolk (originally known as apocalyptic folk) is a music genre that originally emerged during the 1980s through the British post-punk and industrial music scene. It is primarily characterized by acoustic instrumentation and draws influences from dark wave and post-industrial styles such as dark ambient.

== Characteristics ==
Neofolk blends elements of traditional and contemporary folk music with post-industrial and avant-garde influences, distinguishing it from mainstream folk traditions. It is commonly defined by the use of acoustic instruments. Artists incorporate influences from genres such as dark wave and dark ambient. Vocals may range from melodic singing to spoken word, with arrangements emphasizing atmosphere and mood over conventional song structures. Most neofolk artists stem from Nordic countries, Germany and Italy. The style often incorporates lyrical themes drawn from paganism, nature, and European history and mythology.

== History ==
=== Forerunners ===
Neofolk has its origins in 1960s musical groups who began taking influence from traditional folk music. Folk musicians such as Vulcan's Hammer, Changes, Leonard Cohen, and Comus could be considered harbingers of the sound that later influenced the neofolk artists. The later explorations of the Velvet Underground's band members, specifically those of Nico, have also been cited as a major influence on what later became neofolk.

=== 1980s–2000s: Origins ===
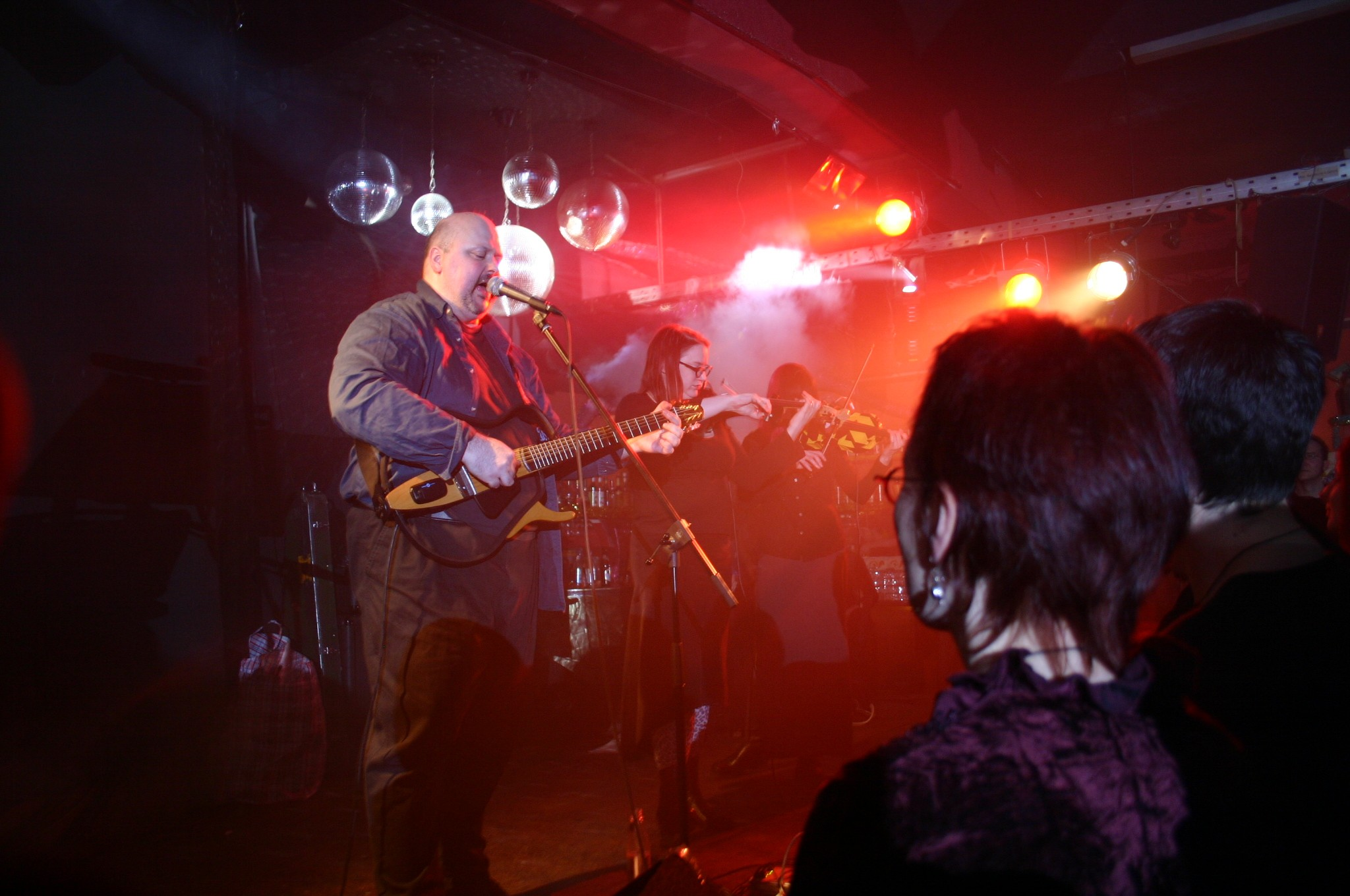
Sol Invictus in live concert

Neofolk originated in the 1980s, with bands from the dark wave, post-punk and industrial music scenes, including Death In June, Current 93 and Sol Invictus, who began taking influence from this sound. The sound was embraced by Swans on their early 1990s albums such as Love of Life (1992), by the time of their 1997 disbandment, they had become what Exclaim! writer Dimitri Nasrallah called the "leading lights in the early 2000's neo-folk movement". The embrace of the genre continued into the releases of lead vocalist Michael Gira's subsequent band Angels of Light. During the late 1990s, the sound of the genre began to be embraced by bands who had previously played black metal, such as Empyrium and Haggard.

As a descriptor, the term "apocalyptic folk" predates neofolk and was used by Current 93's David Tibet to describe the music of his band during the late 1980s and early 1990s. Initially, Tibet did not intend to imply connection with the folk music genre; rather, that Current 93 was made by "apocalyptic folk": in other words, apocalyptic people. Tibet and Current 93 produced some covers of traditional English folk songs, and Tibet himself was a great advocate for reclusive English folk singer Shirley Collins. Other vague terms sometimes used to describe artists of this genre include dark folk and pagan folk. These terms are umbrella terms that also describe various other forms of unrelated music.

== Culture ==
A majority of artists within the neofolk genre use archaic, cultural and literary references. Local traditions and indigenous beliefs are also heavily portrayed, as are esoteric and historical topics. Various forms of neopaganism and occultism play a part in the themes touched upon by many modern and original neofolk artists. Runic alphabets, heathen European sites and other means of expressing an interest in the ancient and ancestral occur often in neofolk music. The sociologist Peter Webb describes this as a legacy from romantic poetry and a reaction against the rationalism of the Enlightenment. Webb writes that for bands like Sol Invictus, this leads to "a type of esoteric spirituality where paganism comes to the fore because of its respect for nature, its openness about sexuality, and its rituals and ceremonies guided by the seasons". Aesthetically, references to this subject occur within band names, album artwork, clothing and various other means of artistic expression. This has led to some forefathers of the genre and current artists within the genre attributing it to being an aspect of a broader neopagan revival. David Tibet of Current 93, one of the most influential neofolk bands, regards himself as a Christian, but he believes that truth always is hidden and is more interested in apocalyptic and apocryphal literature than any Christian canon. During a period of heavy amphetamine and LSD use in the 1980s, he began to revere the children's character Noddy as a Gnostic deity.

Many bands use metaphors, sometimes borrowing terms such as Ernst Jünger's Waldgänger and using fascist symbols and slogans, which has led to an association of the genre with the far-right, though this is contested by fans. References to occult, pagan and politically far-right figures and movement are often intentionally ambiguous. Stefanie von Schnurbein has described the genre's approach to these types of material as an "elitist Nietzschean masquerade" which expresses a "(neo-)romantic art-religious attitude". Some bands have stated opposition to the perceived fascist apologia and themes in the genre and the related genre of martial industrial.

== Related genres ==
=== Martial industrial ===
Martial industrial (also known as military pop) is a genre developed very closely to neofolk and includes militaristic or political themes.
