= Procession: An Aural History =

Greatest hits album by Savage Republic
- Released: September 7, 2010
- Recorded: 1982–2007
- Genre: Post-punk
- Length: 122:49
- Label: LTM Recordings

Savage Republic chronology
| 1938 (2007) | Procession: An Aural History (2010) | Varvakios (2012) |

Professional ratings
Review scores
| Source | Rating |
|---|---|
| AllMusic | 4.5/5 stars |

Procession: An Aural History 1981–2010 is a compilation album by American post-punk band Savage Republic, released on September 7, 2010 by LTM Recordings. The release included selected material from all of the band's studio albums, including tracks from EPs and singles. The two-disc edition comes with a live performance of the band in Spain on January 30, 2010.

== Track listing ==
All songs composed by Savage Republic, except "Viva la Rock 'N' Roll" by Alternative TV.

Disc 1
| No. | Title | Original Album | Length |
|---|---|---|---|
| 1. | "The Ivory Coast" | Tragic Figures | 3:11 |
| 2. | "Next to Nothing" | Tragic Figures | 3:23 |
| 3. | "Film Noir" | Tragic Figures | 3:28 |
| 4. | "Mobilization" | – | 3:20 |
| 5. | "Siege" | Trudge | 4:21 |
| 6. | "Andelusia" | Ceremonial | 5:40 |
| 7. | "Ceremonial" | Ceremonial | 5:08 |
| 8. | "Walking Backwards" | Ceremonial | 3:44 |
| 9. | "Viva la Rock 'n' Roll" | Jamahiriya | 2:28 |
| 10. | "Tabula Rasa" | Jamahiriya | 6:44 |
| 11. | "Jamahiriya" | Jamahiriya | 7:21 |
| 12. | "The Birds of Pork" | Customs | 6:25 |
| 13. | "Sucker Punch" | Customs | 5:24 |
| 14. | "1938" | 1938 | 6:53 |
| 15. | "Siam" | 1938 | 8:20 |
| 16. | "Sword Fighter" | – | 4:07 |

Disc 2
| No. | Title | Original Album | Length |
|---|---|---|---|
| 1. | "Year of Exile" | Ceremonial | 7:49 |
| 2. | "Next to Nothing" | Tragic Figures | 3:25 |
| 3. | "Mobilization" | – | 3:38 |
| 4. | "Trek" | Trudge | 6:07 |
| 5. | "Siam" | 1938 | 8:55 |
| 6. | "Viva la Rock 'n' Roll" | Jamahiriya | 2:23 |
| 7. | "1938" | 1938 | 4:03 |
| 8. | "Procession" | Tragic Figures | 8:55 |
