= Nipiagogeion: Live in Europe 1988 =

ΝΗΠΙΑΓΩΓΕΙΟΝ: Live in Europe 1988

Live album by Savage Republic
- Released: 1990
- Recorded: November 1988
- Genre: Post-punk, experimental rock
- Length: 63:32
- Label: Fundamental
- Producer: Savage Republic

Savage Republic chronology
Customs (1989)	ΝΗΠΙΑΓΩΓΕΙΟΝ: Live in Europe 1988 (1990)	Recordings From Live Performance, 1981 - 1983 (1992)

Professional ratings
Review scores
Source	Rating
AllMusic	2/5 stars

ΝΗΠΙΑΓΩΓΕΙΟΝ: Live in Europe 1988 (Nipiagogeion, kindergarten) is a live album by American post-punk band Savage Republic, released in 1990 by Fundamental Records.

== Track listing ==
No.	Title	Writer(s)	Length
1.	"Spice Fields"	Philip Drucker, Greg Grunke, Thom Furhmann, Brad Laner, Bruce Licher, Ethan Port	6:41
2.	"Mobilization"	Drucker, Erskine, Licher, Long	3:29
3.	"Jamahiriya"	Drucker, Grunke, Furhmann, Laner, Licher, Port	6:14
4.	"Next to Nothing"	Drucker, Erskine, Licher, Long	3:17
5.	"Kill the Fascists!"	Drucker, Erskine, Licher, Long	2:34
6.	"Lethal Musk"	Drucker, Grunke, Furhmann, Laner, Licher, Port	3:59
7.	"Viva la Rock 'n' Roll" (Alternative TV cover)	Mark Perry, Chris Bennett, Dennis Burns	2:54
8.	"Siege"	Erskine, Grunke, Furhmann, Licher, Port	3:50
9.	"Year of Exile"	Erskine, Grunke, Furhmann, Licher, Robert Loveless, Port	8:48
10.	"Procession"	Drucker, Erskine, Licher, Long	5:19
11.	"Sucker Punch"	Drucker, Grunke, Furhmann, Laner, Licher	5:23
12.	"O Adonis"	Mikis Theodorakis	2:12
13.	"The Ivory Coast"	Drucker, Erskine, Licher, Long	2:26
14.	"21st Century Schizoid Man" (King Crimson cover)	Robert Fripp, Michael Giles, Greg Lake, Ian McDonald, Peter Sinfield	0:44
15.	"Grinch"	Drucker, Grunke, Furhmann, Laner, Licher	5:42

== Personnel ==
Adapted from the ΝΗΠΙΑΓΩΓΕΙΟΝ: Live in Europe 1988 liner notes.

Savage Republic

- Philip Drucker (as Jackson Del Rey) – instruments
- Thom Furhmann – instruments
- Greg Grunke – instruments
- Brad Laner – instruments
- Bruce Licher – instruments, design

Production

- Savage Republic – production

== Release history ==
Region	Date	Label	Format	Catalog
United States	1990	Fundamental	CD, LP	SAVE 87
