= Stuart Swezey =

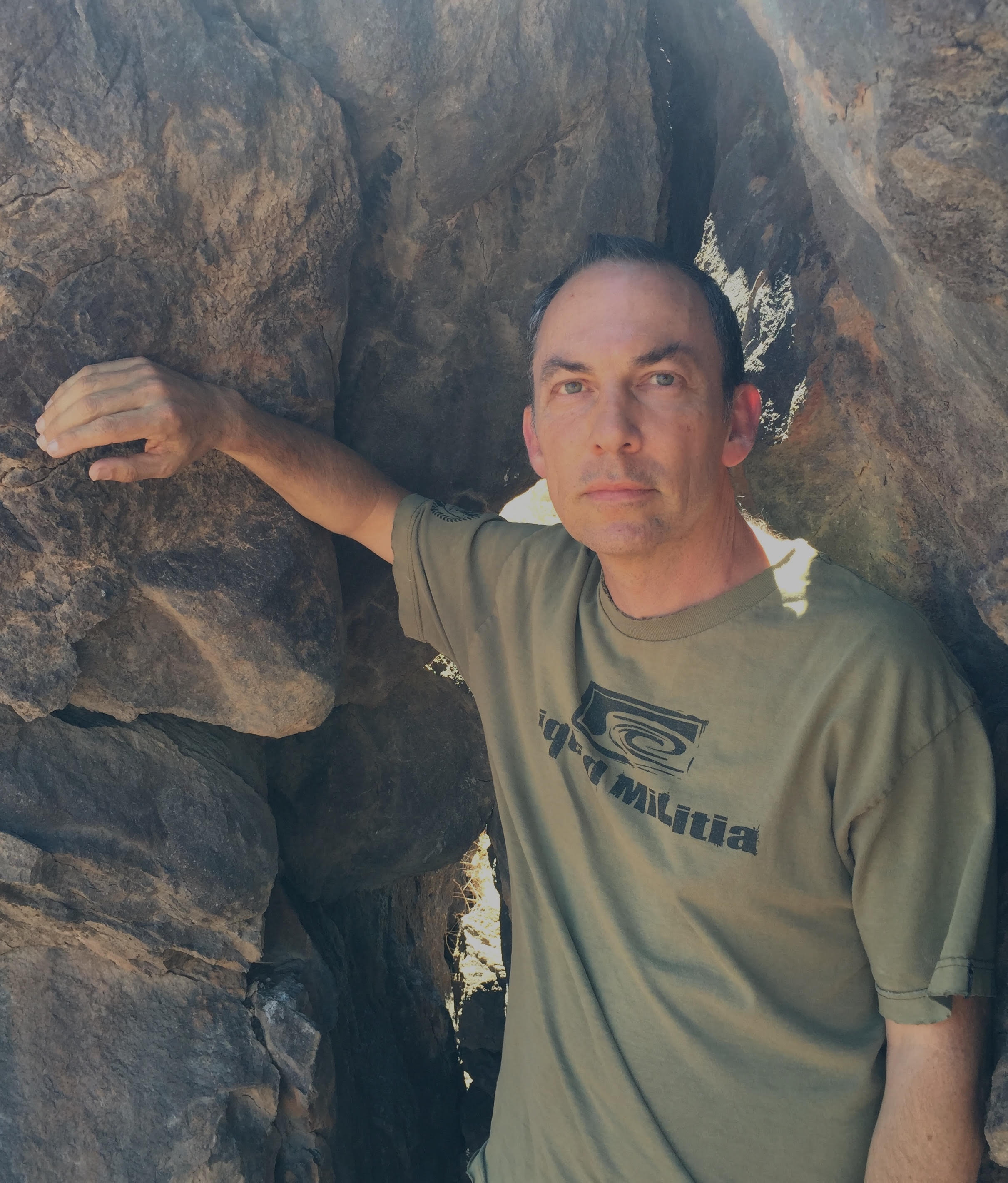
- Swezey in 2018
- Born: August 23, 1961 (age 64); Los Angeles, California, U.S.
- Occupation(s): Producer, Director, Writer
- Years active: 1980s–present
- Known for: Founder of Desolation Center, Director of Desolation Center (2018)

Stuart Swezey (born 1961) is an American filmmaker, event organizer, and publisher best known for founding the Desolation Center series of underground music and performance art festivals in the 1980s. These desert-based events are widely credited with influencing the development of large-scale alternative music festivals such as Burning Man, Coachella, and Lollapalooza. Swezey later directed the 2018 documentary film Desolation Center, which chronicled the history and cultural significance of those early gatherings. He is also the founder of Amok Books, a Los Angeles-based publishing house known for its countercultural and transgressive literature.

== Biography ==
Stuart Swezey was in his early twenties when he founded Desolation Center which would become a music festival template for everything from Coachella, Lollapalooza, and Burning Man.

In the early 1980s, a 20-year-old Swezey, growing up in Los Angeles and immersed in the burgeoning local punk scene decided to bring his friends, and bands out to the California desert. Stuart also invited a few experimental artists for a series of loosely organized shows. These shows combined guerrilla music and arts which led to a number of festivals out in the California Desert, including one held out on a whale watching boat in the Pacific Ocean. The festivals eventually ended, many of the bands went on to global recognition and Swezey would co-found the popular publishing house Amok Books.

== Career ==
During a trip to Mexico in his early twenties while listening to music groups such as PiL, Wire, and Savage Republic on his Walkman, Swezey came up with the idea to have a festival in the middle of the California desert. After his visit from Mexico Stuart contacted Bruce Licher founder of Independent Project Records and the front man of the band Savage Republic to share his idea of having a concert in the middle of the desert, Licher drove Swezey to a location near Lucerne Valley called Soggy Dried Lake. The first iteration of this festival was hosted in the Mojave desert presented by Desolation Center entitled Mojave Exodus. The first gathering in the Mojave Desert featured performances by Savage Republic and The Minutemen on April 24, 1984. Stuart printed two hundred and fifty that were sold at $12.50 each and distributed at local record stores around Los Angeles. Those who attended this first gathering were picked up in downtown Los Angeles and were transported to the secret location in the Mojave desert via school buses. The Second show in the desert featured Einstürzende Neubauten, Survival Research Labs, and others which would be titled "Mojave Auszug" a German Translation inspired by Stuarts time spent in West Germany. The third iteration of Desolation Center would travel to the sea through the use of a whaling boat named the MV Comorant. This event was titled the "Joy At Sea" and featured the Meat Puppets, Points of Friction, Minutemen, and Lawndale. Comorant set sail from San Pedro to Long Beach Harbors port on June 25, 1984. "Gilla Monster Jamboree" was the final show by Desolation Center. This show returned to the desert and featured bands such as the Meat Puppets, Redd Kross, Psi Com (fronted by the lead singer of Jane's Addiction Perry Ferrell), and Sonic Youth which was their first ever west coast show.

In 1986, Swezey collaborated with Brian King to open a bookstore in Silver Lake California called Amok. Due to lack of funds King and Swezey created a series of dispatches that allowed readers to order from a catalog of listings ranging from topics such as medical journals, French anarchist treatises, tax evasion, Self mutilation, and so much more. Since 1986 Amok has released five dispatches.
