= Strange Kicks =

Studio album by Alternative TV
- Released: 1981
- Recorded: April 1981
- Studios: Matrix Recording Studios, Bloomsbury, London
- Genre: New wave
- Length: 57:09
- Label: I.R.S.
- Producer: Richard Mazda

Alternative TV chronology
| Vibing Up the Senile Man (Part One) (1979) | Strange Kicks (1981) | Peep Show (1987) |

Strange Kicks is the third studio album by English post-punk band Alternative TV, released in 1981 by I.R.S. Records. The album showed a shift towards a more new wave style, whilst keeping with the band's non-commercial ethos.

== Recording ==
Strange Kicks was recorded at Matrix Recording Studios in London, England in April 1981.

== Reception ==
Professional ratings
Review scores
| Source | Rating |
|---|---|
| AllMusic | 2/5 stars |

Dean McFarlane of AllMusic wrote the album "fall[s] a little flat amidst the confusion and veer[s] closer to the new wave sound than most punks would dare to venture." Trouser Press called the album "a different proposition altogether", calling it a "snappy romp through an assortment of styles (ska, pop-punk, even electro-dance)".

== Track listing ==
All tracks are written by Alternative TV and Richard Mazda.

Side A
| No. | Title | Length |
|---|---|---|
| 1. | "The Ancient Rebels" | 2:56 |
| 2. | "Strange Kicks" | 2:44 |
| 3. | "Communicate" | 2:47 |
| 4. | "Mirror Boy" | 3:03 |
| 5. | "Anye Is Back" | 2:46 |
| 6. | "My Hand Is Still Wet" | 3:22 |

Side B
| No. | Title | Length |
|---|---|---|
| 1. | "Fun City" | 2:47 |
| 2. | "TV Operator" | 3:20 |
| 3. | "There Goes My Date with Doug" | 2:55 |
| 4. | "Cold Rain" | 3:49 |
| 5. | "Who Are They?" | 3:23 |
| 6. | "Sleep in Bed" | 3:04 |

== Personnel ==
Alternative TV

- Mark Perry – vocals
- Alex Ferguson – guitar
- Alan Gruner – keyboards
- Dennis Burns – bass guitar
- Ray Weston – drums

Additional personnel

- Richard Mazda – guitar, percussion, backing vocals, production
- Dee Dee Thorne – vocals on track B3
- Brian James – guitar on track B3

Technical

- Jesse Sutcliffe – engineering
- X3 Posters – cover art
- Barbarann Reeves – sleeve design
- Watal Asanuma – back cover photography
- Flash Gunn – front cover photography
