= Simon Strong =

English novelist and singer (born 1964)

Simon Strong (born 1964) is an English novelist, singer and filmmaker, residing in Melbourne, Australia.

He is known as the writer of the novel A259 Multiplex Bomb 'Outrage' and as front-man for the psychedelic new-wave (neo-psychedelia) group Pink Stainless Tail.

== Early life ==
Strong was raised in Ecclesfield, in Sheffield, South Yorkshire, and attended local comprehensive schools. Family connections allowed him to pursue an interest in electronics and computing, and from the mid-1970s he was active in local computer clubs and his programs and articles were published in home-computer magazines.

In 1982, Strong left Sheffield to attend Brighton Polytechnic and went on to work programming for artificial intelligence projects, specialising in the then-new field of interface design. Increasingly politicised by the rise of Thatcherism, Strong dropped out of computing and took a succession of menial jobs (including toilet cleaner, bouncer and bookseller) and concentrated on creative writing. During a tenure at Hatchards Booksellers, Strong helped organise literary events by writers, including Nick Cave and Billy Childish.

By 1989, Strong was residing above an Indian take-away in the red-light district with Palmer and Taylor of beat group The Fire Dept. They were often visited by experimental novelist Stewart Home, who exerted a profound influence on Strong's writing. Around this time, Strong was also performing with his own outfit, the Barry Jeffries.

== Overground / CodeX ==
From 1993 to 1997, Strong worked for Overground Records, based at their production and distribution centre in Hove. He co-ordinated and designed covers for musicians, including The Television Personalities, AlternativeTV, Richard Hell, Alex Fergusson, The Undead (ex-Misfits), TheeHeadcoats, Man or Astroman?, Subway Sect, GG Allin. Strong was instrumental in the re-issuing the oeuvre of Jon the Postman.

In 1996, inspired by small presses, including Atlas Press, Temple Press and Creation Books, Strong founded CodeX Books and Records as a branch of Overground. Over the next twelve months, he issued Home's Cranked Up Really High, Hell's The Voidoid, Childish's My Fault and Kathy Acker's Pussy on CD.

Creation Books had previously accepted Strong's novel A259 Multiplex Bomb "Outrage", but delays in its publication led to Strong issuing the book on the CodeX imprint. The book was enthusiastically received, selling out two printings in six months, but momentum was lost when Strong suddenly emigrated to Australia in early 1997, although a Russian translation of the book appeared in 2006.

== Melbourne, Australia ==
After a hiatus, Strong joined Harry Howard, Sonke Rickertsen and Nick Boddington to form the Pink Stainless Tail in 2001, and went on to release three records. The group was popular with a small-but-fanatical group of fans with Strong's stage persona memorably (and consistently) described as "a flailing scarecrow amalgam of William Burroughs and Mark E Smith".

In February 2004, the Victorian College of the Arts invited Home as writer-in-residence and commissioned Strong to run a course to introduce students to Home's themes and praxis. Around this time, Strong set up his netlabel, The http://www.ledatape.net LedaTape Organisation], as an outlet for his work and others.

Over the next few years, Strong finalised two books (in collaboration with Jason Crest) that had been in development since the publication of A259. Rape vs. Murder was produced entirely (in one run) by a computer program from a corpus of books published by the Paris Olympia Press, whilst 66mindfuck99 was a fictionalised account of the creation of the former. Both of these publications were privately printed and circulated samizdat, not because their content was contentious, but rather due to Strong's vehement rejection of the conventional publishing paradigm. Despite their limited availability, the books were well received and in 2010 were taught at the American University of Pennsylvania by Kenneth Goldsmith, curator of ubu.com.

== Novels ==
- A259 Multiplex Bomb "Outrage" (CodeX)
- 66mindfuck99 (with Jason Crest, hors commers)
- Rape vs. Murder (wihg #579, hors commers)

== CD releases ==
- The Infinite Wisdom of the Pink Stainless Tail, with The Pink Stainless Tail : CD : March 2007
- This Is Me in the Park with No Clothes On… I Like the Flowers, with The Pink Stainless Tail : CD : May 2005
- The Sky's a Soft Target, with The Pink Stainless Tail : CD : 2003
