= Red Temple Spirits =

American post-punk band

- Origin: Los Angeles, California, United States
- Genres: Post-punk, gothic rock, psychedelic rock
- Years active: 1987–1992, 1998
- Labels: Independent Project, Nate Starkman & Son, Fundamental, Parasol, Mannequin
- Past members: William Faircloth; Thomas Pierik; Dallas Taylor; Dino Paredes; Scott McPherson; Alex Koffler

Red Temple Spirits were an American post-punk band from Los Angeles, California, formed in 1987.

== History ==
Forming in 1987, the group's original lineup consisted of vocalist William Faircloth, guitarist Dallas Taylor, bass guitarist Dino Paredes and drummer Thomas Pierik. Faircloth, an immigrant from England, had previously sung for trio Ministry of Love, who released the Wide Awake and Dreaming EP in 1987 on the label Underworld. Paredes had previously played with Kelly Wheeler of Psi Com. Pierik and Taylor had earlier been members of the Web, along with bassist Johann Schumann (later of Christian Death).

Red Temple Spirits' name was inspired by the song "Two Headed Dog (Red Temple Prayer)" by Roky Erickson, whom they admired. Other influences ranged from post-punk bands such as the Cure and Savage Republic to psychedelic artists like Pink Floyd (they covered "The Nile Song" and "Set the Controls for the Heart of the Sun" on their releases), melded with Native American and Tibetan mysticism.

Red Temple Spirits released two albums on the Nate Starkman & Son label, distributed by Fundamental Records: double-LP set Dancing to Restore an Eclipsed Moon (1988) and If Tomorrow I Were Leaving for Lhasa, I Wouldn't Stay a Minute More... (1989).

Their sole single, an elaborately packaged release (a limited-edition, numbered edition of 1,200 copies) on Independent Project Records to benefit Tibet House, featured A-side "New Land" (recorded in 1987 as part of the band's first demo) and B-side "Exodus from Lhasa" (recorded in 1989).

Red Temple Spirits began to garner more attention in late 1989 after a promo video for "City of Millions" was shown on MTV's 120 Minutes and they performed at the 1989 CMJ Music Marathon in New York City. With new drummer Scott McPherson, the band toured the United States in early 1990 to promote If Tomorrow I Were Leaving for Lhasa, garnering significant press and a devoted cult fanbase, but lapsed into inactivity later that year following a serious van accident in California. They disbanded in 1992, with Faircloth and Taylor relocating to Sedona, Arizona.

Paredes, who had worked as an art director for music labels Triple X, Priority and Chameleon, later became vice president of A&R for Rick Rubin's American Recordings, where he signed System of a Down and Wesley Willis among others.

While in Sedona, Faircloth (a printer for Independent Project Press) and Taylor recorded a cassette-only album, The Alien Host, under the name Invisible Opera Company of Tibet. It was released in 1996 by Parasol Records. The pair briefly revived the name Red Temple Spirits in 1998, but did not release any new material. Alex Koffler (great-nephew of Kurt Weill and later the musician behind the projects the Beauty Above and Blackswan) played keyboards in this lineup.

After nearly a decade of dormancy, Faircloth, Taylor and Pierik discussed a reformation in 2007, but plans to record a third album did not come to fruition and the band remained inactive.

Independent Project Records remastered the first two albums and reissued them as a limited-edition two-disc box set in 2013, with three bonus tracks: both sides of the "New Land" 7" and a previously unreleased remake of "New Land". The first 300 copies in IPR's numbered edition also included a bonus third disc featuring four remastered tracks from the band's 1987 demo.

In 2014, Mannequin Records reissued both Dancing to Restore an Eclipsed Moon and If Tomorrow I Were Leaving for Lhasa, I Wouldn't Stay a Minute More... on vinyl in Germany (catalog numbers MNQ 047 and MNQ 048).

Guitarist and founding member Dallas Taylor died February 10, 2023. His death was reported by the official Red Temple Spirits page in June 2023.

== Discography ==
=== Studio albums ===
- Dancing to Restore an Eclipsed Moon (1988, Nate Starkman & Son/Fundamental; 2014 German reissue, Mannequin Records – MNQ 047)
- If Tomorrow I Were Leaving for Lhasa, I Wouldn't Stay a Minute More... (1989, Nate Starkman & Son/Fundamental; 2014 German reissue, Mannequin Records – MNQ 048)

=== Singles ===
- "New Land"/"Exodus from Lhasa" 7" (1989, Independent Project Records)

=== Compilation albums ===
- Red Temple Spirits box set (2013, Independent Project Records)
