= Peep Show (Alternative TV album) =

Studio album by Alternative TV
- Released: 1987
- Recorded: May–July 1987
- Studio: Cold Storage, Brixton; Remaximum Studios, Clapham; Silent Music, Rotherhithe
- Label: Anagram
- Producer: Grant Showbiz

Alternative TV chronology
Strange Kicks (1981)	Peep Show (1987)	Dragon Love (1990)

Professional ratings
Review scores
Source	Rating
AllMusic	3/5 stars
New Musical Express	7/10
Trouser Press	generally favourable

Peep Show is the fourth studio album by English band Alternative TV, released in 1987 by record label Anagram.

== Track listing ==
1. "Chrissie's Moon"
2. "Let's Sleep Now"
3. "Tumble Time"
4. "The River"
5. "Boy Eats Girl"
6. "My Baby's Laughing (Empty Summer Dream)"
7. "Scandal"
8. "White Walls"
9. "Animal"

== Personnel ==
- Mark Perry – guitar, percussion, vocals
- Steve Cannell – bass, keyboards, percussion
- Allison Phillips – drums, percussion

with

- Protag – various guitars
- Dave George – keyboards on "Tumble Time", "The River" and "White Walls"
- Anno Graver – vocals on "Boy Eats Girl"
- Justin Adams – guitar on "Let's Sleep Now"
- Karl Blake – guitar on "Boy Eats Girl"
- Terry Edwards – saxophone, trumpet
- Dave Jago – trombone
- Frank Sweeney – violin, viola
- Izzy Davies – vocals on "Tumble Time" and "White Walls"
- Clive Giblin – guitar on "Animal"
