= Echelons (album) =

Studio album by For Against
- Released: 1987
- Label: Independent Project

Professional ratings
Review scores
Source	Rating
AllMusic	4/5 stars
MusicHound Rock: The Essential Album Guide	3.5/5 stars

Echelons is the debut studio album by American post-punk band For Against, released in 1987 by Independent Project Records.

== Album cover ==
The album was nominated for a 1988 Grammy award for Best Album Package - Incl. Album Cover, Graphic Arts, Photography. It was designed by Bruce Licher of Savage Republic.

== Critical reception ==
AllMusic called the album "a spectacular listen" and "one of the most important releases of its time." PopMatters declared it "a fine debut, and a must have for anyone interested in the best of American college rock from the 1980s."
