= List of Mediterranean maritime coalitions =

This list includes multinational maritime-security coalitions, forces and operations established in the Mediterranean Sea and its approaches in order to protect shipping, enforce freedom of navigation, suppress piracy or respond to other maritime threats. It also includes operations with other primary goals when these involve major naval activity.

Coalition, force or operation	Period	Principal area	Character and relevance to shipping
Multinational Maritime Defense Alliance	2026–present	Red Sea, Bab-el-Mandeb and Gulf of Aden	A Saudi-led alliance established during the 2026 Iran war to support collective maritime defence, freedom of navigation, international trade and the security of energy-supply routes.
Operation Aspides	2024–present	Red Sea, Bab-el-Mandeb, Gulf of Aden, Arabian Sea, Gulf of Oman and Persian Gulf	A European Union operation during the Red Sea crisis providing maritime situational awareness, accompanying merchant vessels and defending them against attacks at sea.
Operation Prosperity Guardian	2023–present	Red Sea, Bab-el-Mandeb and Gulf of Aden	A United States-led multinational operation formed in response to Houthi attacks on commercial shipping; cooperates with Combined Task Force 153 to provide security for vessels using the Red Sea route.
Operation Irini	2020–present	Central Mediterranean	A European Union operation primarily enforcing of the United Nations arms embargo on Libya.
European Maritime Awareness in the Strait of Hormuz	2020–present	Strait of Hormuz, Persian Gulf, Gulf of Oman and Arabian Sea	A French-led European initiative with naval component, Operation AGENOR, monitors maritime traffic and accompanies or reassures merchant vessels.
International Maritime Security Construct	2019–present	Persian Gulf, Strait of Hormuz, Gulf of Oman, Gulf of Aden, Bab-el-Mandeb and southern Red Sea	A multinational coalition, formed after attacks on and seizures of oil tankers in 2019 by Houthis, conducts surveillance and defensive patrols to preserve freedom of navigation.
Operation Sea Guardian	2016–present	Mediterranean	This successor to Operation Active Endeavour provides maritime situational awareness, supports counterterrorism efforts, freedom of navigation and protection of critical maritime infrastructure.
Operation Sophia	2015–2020	Central Mediterranean	A European Union naval operation directed against migrant-smuggling and human-trafficking networks.
Operation Ocean Shield	2009–2016	Gulf of Aden, Somali coast and Arabian Sea	NATO's multinational counter-piracy operation protected merchant and humanitarian shipping.
Operation Atalanta	2008–present	Gulf of Aden, waters off Somalia and the western Indian Ocean	A European Union counter-piracy operation protects World Food Programme vessels and other vulnerable ships sailing the route between the Indian Ocean and the Suez Canal.
UNIFIL Maritime Task Force	2006–present	Lebanese territorial waters and the eastern Mediterranean	A multinational United Nations naval force monitored the maritime traffic, assisted Lebanon in preventing unauthorized arms shipments and helped the Lebanese Navy.
Combined Maritime Forces	2002–present	Persian Gulf, Strait of Hormuz, Gulf of Oman, Arabian Sea, Gulf of Aden, Bab-el-Mandeb and Red Sea	A multinational naval partnership including task forces CTF 150, CTF 151, CTF 152 and CTF 153 is responsible for counter-piracy, maritime security and protection of shipping.
Operation Active Endeavour	2001–2016	Mediterranean and Strait of Gibraltar	A NATO counterterrorism operation monitored and boarded suspect vessels, as well as escorted designated merchant vessels through the Strait of Gibraltar.
European Maritime Force	1995–present	Principally the Mediterranean and its approaches	A non-standing regional force established by France, Italy, Portugal and Spain to provide sea control, freedom of navigation and protection of sea lines of communication.
Operation Sharp Guard	1993–1996	Adriatic Sea	A joint NATO–Western European Union operation enforced United Nations sanctions and the arms embargo against the former Yugoslavia.
Standing NATO Maritime Group 2	1969–present	Mediterranean and adjoining waters	A multinational NATO naval formation, formerly known as the Naval On-Call Force Mediterranean and Standing Naval Force Mediterranean, supports maritime readiness, sea control and freedom of navigation.
Anglo-Dutch expedition against Algiers	1816	Western Mediterranean	A British–Dutch naval expedition intended to suppress corsairing from Algiers, release captives and compel the Deylik of Algiers to end attacks on European shipping.
Allied expedition against Algiers	1784	Western Mediterranean	An ad hoc Spanish, Neapolitan, Maltese and Portuguese fleet sent against Algiers with the aim of ending corsair attacks on shipping.
Holy League (1332)	1332–1337	Aegean and eastern Mediterranean	An alliance formed to stop naval raids by the Turkish Anatolian beyliks, which threatened islands, coastal settlements and maritime commerce.
Delian League	478–404 BC	Aegean Sea	An alliance against the Achaemenid Empire also suppressed piracy and secured Aegean maritime communications and commerce.

== Literature ==
- Pomarède, Julien (April 2021). "Imagining (in)security: NATO's collective self-defence and post-9/11 military policing in the Mediterranean Sea". Review of International Studies. 47 (2): 192–210. doi:10.1017/S0260210521000024.
- Dombrowski, Peter; Reich, Simon (December 2019). "The EU's maritime operations and the future of European security: Learning from operations Atalanta and Sophia". Comparative European Politics. 17 (6): 860–884. doi:10.1057/s41295-018-0131-4.
- Soler García, Carolina (2022). "La Unión Europea, ¿un gendarme en el Mediterráneo central?: las operaciones EUNAVFOR MED Sophia e Irini" [The European Union, a gendarme in the central Mediterranean?: EUNAVFOR MED operations Sophia and Irini]. Revista Española de Derecho Internacional (in Spanish). 74 (1): 47–63.
- Simoneau-Byrne, Fiona; Saliou, Virginie; Cadiou, Etienne; Dulière, Marthe-Flavie; Nègre, Thomas; Tachet, Alexis (2025). "Decision-Making and Cultural Factors in Combat: A Study of Naval Responses to Houthi Attacks in the Red Sea". Proelium. Series VIII. 8 (16): 65–89. doi:10.60746/8_16_42457.
- Riddervold, Marianne (2018). The Maritime Turn in EU Foreign and Security Policies: Aims, Actors and Mechanisms of Integration. Cham: Palgrave Macmillan. doi:10.1007/978-3-319-66598-6. ISBN 978-3-319-66597-9.
- Germond, Basil (2015). The Maritime Dimension of European Security: Seapower and the European Union. Palgrave Studies in European Union Politics. London: Palgrave Macmillan. doi:10.1057/9781137017819. ISBN 978-1-137-01780-2.
- Karlsson, Malin (11 April 2024). A Preliminary Analysis of Naval Operations in the Red Sea: Aspides and Operation Prosperity Guardian (Report). FOI Memo. Stockholm: Swedish Defence Research Agency. pp. 1–10.
- Marcuzzi, Stefano (December 2018). NATO–EU Maritime Cooperation: For What Strategic Effect? (Report). NDC Policy Brief. Rome: NATO Defense College.
