= 1938 (disambiguation) =

1938 was a common year starting on Saturday of the Gregorian calendar.

1938 may also refer to:

- 1938 BC, a year in the 20th century BC
- 1938 (number), a number
- 1938 (album), by Savage Republic, 2007
- 1938, an EP by Soul-Junk, 2002
