= Independent Project Records =

Independent Project Records (IPR) is an independent record label based in Bishop, California. It was founded by Bruce Licher in 1980 in Los Angeles, then moved to Sedona, Arizona, between 1992 and 2009. The label started when the Project 197 7” EP was released. 1982 was when the first letterpress covers were made. IPR is a partner entity to Independent Project Press. The label is significant for its use letterpress printing as an artistic element in packaging and helping to launch the careers of bands such as Camper Van Beethoven and Savage Republic.

== History ==
Licher received a Grammy nomination for the artwork for For Against's debut album on IPR, Echelons (1987).

== Discography ==
As listed on Esophagus.com and Discogs.com.

Year	Catalog number	Band	Title	Format
1980	IP001	Project 197	Project 197	7-inch EP
	IP002	Bridge	Bridge	7-inch EP
1981	IP003	Them Rhythm Ants	Them Rhythm Quails	7-inch EP
1982	IP004	Savage Republic	Tragic Figures	LP
	IP005/6	Human Hands	Human Hands	2 x LP
	IP007	Human Hands	"Sensible Guy"	7-inch
1983	IP008	Kommunity FK	The Vision and the Voice	LP
	IP009	Savage Republic	"Film Noir"	7-inch
	IPTEN	Bruce Licher	Bridge Soundtrack	1-sided 7-inch
	IP010/11	Bruce Licher	The Soundtrack Recordings of "Bridge" and Copyright 1980	7-inch
1984	IP012	Neef	Neef 23	7-inch EP
	IP013	Savage Republic	Tragic Figure	7-inch EP
	IP014	Party Boys	No Aggro	LP
1985	IP015	Kommunity FK	Close One Sad Eye	LP
	IP016	Camper Van Beethoven	Telephone Free Landslide Victory	LP
	IP017	Ten Foot Faces	Don't Want Love	7-inch EP
1986	IP018	Savage Republic	Ceremonial	LP
1987	IP019	For Against	Echelons (album)	LP
	IP020	Woo	Whichever Way You Are Going, You Are Going Wrong	LP
1988	IP021	Savage Republic	"Viva La Rock 'N' Roll"	7-inch
	IP022	Deception Bay	Deception Bay	LP
	IP023	For Against	December	LP / CD
1989	IP024/25	Bruce Licher	Independent Projects	2×10″
	IP026	Red Temple Spirits	"New Land"	7-inch
	IP027	Indian Bingo	Scatological	LP / CD
	IP028	Woo	It's Cosy Inside	LP / CD
1990	IP029	For Against	In the Marshes	10-inch EP
	IP030	Indian Bingo/Ambulance	IPR 10th Anniversary	7-inch
	IP031/32	Abecedarians	The Other Side of the Fence	2×10″
1991	IP033	Autumnfair	Glaciers and Gods	10-inch EP
	IP034	Deception Bay	Fortune Days	10-inch EP
	IP035	Deception Bay	My Color Flag	LP
	IP036	The Dentists	Naked	10-inch EP
	IP037	Indian Bingo	"Big Rock"	7-inch
1992	IP038/39	Savage Republic	Recordings From Live Performance, 1981 - 1983	2×10″
	IP040	For Against	"Don't Do Me Any Favors"	7-inch EP
	IP041	The Dentists	"Charms and the Girl"	7-inch
1993	IP042	Half String	"Eclipse"	7-inch EP
	IP043/44	Fourwaycross	Pendulum	10-inch + 7-inch
	IP0CD45	For Against	Aperture	CD
1994	IP046	Scenic	"The Kelso Run"	7-inch EP
	IP047	Half String	"Oval"	7-inch EP
	IP048CD	Half String	Tripped Up Breathing	CD EP
	IP049	Alison's Halo	"Dozen"	7-inch
	IP051CD	Tone	Build	CD
1995	IP050/CD	Scenic	Incident at Cima	LP / CD
	IP052CD	Half String	Eclipse*Oval*Hue	CD
1996	IP053CD	Jeffrey Clark	Sheer Golden Hooks	CD
	IP054/CD	Scenic	"Sage"	7-inch / CD EP
	IP055CD	Scenic	Acquatica	CD
	IP056CD	Tone	Sustain	CD
	IP057CD	Half String	A Fascination With Heights	CD
	IP058/CD	Scenic/Lanterna	In Live Performance	7-inch / CD EP
1997	IP059CD	For Against	Shelf Life	CD
1999	IP060	Stereolab	"The In Sound"	7" 45
2000	IP061CD	Scenic	Spheres	CD EP
2007	IP062CD	Springhouse	From Now To OK	CD
2010	none	Various	IPR Mail Order Compilation	CDr
2013	IP063/64/65CD	Red Temple Spirits	Red Temple Spirits	3 x CD
2015	IPR71	Lanterna	Backyards	LP
