= Pink Stainless Tail =

Pink Stainless Tail are a rock band formed in Melbourne, Australia in early 2000. The band's members are Nick Boddington (bass gtr), Harry Howard (gtr), Sonke Rickertsen (drums) and Simon Strong (voice). Named after the Red Krayola song of the same name off their debut LP The Parable of Arable Land.

== History ==
When they formed, Howard was best known for his work with his brother Rowland S. Howard in post-Birthday Party groups Crime and the City Solution and These Immortal Souls. Rickertsen had previously been in Slub (and briefly My Bloody Valentine whilst sharing a squat in Berlin with Kevin Shields) before migrating to Melbourne and working with Boddington in a local outfit called The Stuff. Simon Strong has worked behind the scenes at labels such as Overground, One Louder and CodeX, designing covers and producing discs (he claims more than 250) for artists including GG Allin, Alternative TV, Billy Childish, Richard Hell, Television Personalities, and the Fire Dept. The uniting factors of this unusual quartet were a love for raw garage punk and the ability to work together as a team with very little or no verbal communication at all. The name Pink Stainless Tail is taken from the Red Crayola song of the same name, which is featured on their 1967 album Parable of Arable Land.

== Sound ==
The group's sound is often described as characteristic of eighties Manchester groups such as The Fall, Magazine, or Happy Mondays. Their concerts are usually punctuated by rambling surreal monologues and on-stage arguments. The words are usually reminiscent of English high-modernism of the sixties with references to parks, statues and astronomical phenomena, the wistful and romantic content of which is somewhat compromised by Strong's distinctive vehement delivery. They have covered songs by Syd Barrett, The Tol-puddle Martyrs, Peter Miller, Pulp, and Momus. Their highest profile show was supporting Sonic Youth at The Forum Theatre in Melbourne in 2004, and their debut album was produced by legendary Melbourne producer Simon Grounds.

== Discography ==
=== EPs ===
- 2003 – The Skys a Soft Target

=== Albums ===
- 2005 –This is me in the park with no clothes on... I like the flowers.
- 2007 – The Infinite Wisdom of the Pink Stainless Tail
