= Trudge =

Trudge may refer to:

- Trudge, from list of Yu-Gi-Oh! 5D's characters
- Trudge Valley, Antarctica
- Trudge, 1989 album by Controlled Bleeding
- Trudge, 1985 EP by Savage Republic
- "Trudge", 2012 song by Dntel from Aimlessness
