= Vibing Up the Senile Man (Part One) =

Studio album by Alternative TV
- Released: 2 March 1979
- Recorded: October–November 1978
- Studio: Pathway, London
- Genre: Experimental; post-punk
- Length: 38:47
- Label: Deptford Fun City
- Producer: Dennis Burns; Mark Perry

Alternative TV chronology
The Image Has Cracked (1978)	Vibing Up the Senile Man (Part One) (1979)	Strange Kicks (1981)

Vibing Up the Senile Man (Part One) is the second studio album by English rock band Alternative TV. It was released in March 1979 by record label Deptford Fun City. The band followed a more experimental and avant-garde approach than on The Image Has Cracked (1978).

== Recording ==
The album's tracks were all reportedly recorded in a single take.

== Musical style ==
Regarding its musical style, Alternative TV frontman Mark Perry recalled: "There are free jazz influences; I'd got into the Art Ensemble of Chicago, Sun Ra [...] I'd moved into this house with an amazing music room – pianos, clarinets, you name it – and we'd always be picking up stuff from junk shops."

== Reception ==
Professional ratings
Review scores
Source	Rating
AllMusic	4/5 stars
The New Rolling Stone Record Guide	3/5 stars

According to Simon Reynolds in Rip It Up and Start Again: Postpunk 1978-1984, the album received a "uniformly hostile" response from reviewers upon its release. Trouser Press described the record as being "up the pseudo-avant creek without a paddle".

In his retrospective review of the album, Dean McFarlane of AllMusic noted that "... Mark Perry and friends did to punk exactly what the movement had intended for the establishment", asking, "... who would have expected a follow-up [to The Image Has Cracked] as avant-garde abstraction ...?" He goes on to state that "Vibing Up the Senile Man became closer to free improvisation and avant-garde jazz without a punk anthem in sight ..." and continuing that what it "... represents two decades later is a door opening on multi-faceted post-rock music -- which draws on avant-garde, noise, and jazz and arguably makes more sense in the context of year 2000 as a musical treasure much more than in 1980 ...".

== Legacy ==
Paul Hegarty, in Noise Music: A History, described the album as "forming the bridge into industrial music".

The record was placed at number 19 on Mojo's list of readers' choice of 50 "Weirdest Albums".

== Track listing ==
Side A
No.	Title	Writer(s)	Length
1.	"Release the Natives"	Mark Perry	4:02
2.	"Serpentine Gallery"	Dennis Burns, Perry	2:24
3.	"Poor Association"	Perry	1:49
4.	"The Radio Story"	Burns, Perry	7:48
5.	"Facing Up to the Facts"	Perry	4:08

Side B
No.	Title	Writer(s)	Length
1.	"The Good Missionary"	Perry	7:17
2.	"Graves of Deluxe Green"	Perry	2:58
3.	"Smile in the Day"	Burns, Perry	8:21

== Personnel ==
Alternative TV

- Mark Perry – all other instruments, production
- Dennis Burns – all other instruments, production

Additional personnel

- Mick Linehan – guitar on "Release the Natives" and "The Good Missionary"
- Steve Jameson – third voice on "Smile in the Day"
- Genesis P. Orridge – percussion on "Release the Natives", "Serpentine Gallery" and "Graves of Deluxe Green"

Technical

- Wally Brill – engineering, production, "vibing"
- Jill Furmanovsky – cover photography, sleeve layout
