= Jamahiriya Democratique et Populaire de Sauvage =

Studio album by Savage Republic
- Released: 1988
- Recorded: Lyceum Sound, Santa Monica, CA
- Genre: Post-punk, experimental rock
- Length: 43:59
- Label: Fundamental
- Producer: Vitus Mataré, Savage Republic

Savage Republic chronology
Live Trek 1985 - 1986 (1987)	Jamahiriya Democratique et Populaire de Sauvage (1988)	Customs (1989)

Professional ratings
Review scores
Source	Rating
AllMusic	3/5 stars

Jamahiriya Democratique et Populaire de Sauvage is the third studio album by American post-punk band Savage Republic, released in 1988 by Fundamental Records. It was reissued on Mobilization Records with bonus instrumental tracks in 2002.

== Track listing ==
All tracks are written by Philip Drucker, Greg Grunke, Thom Furhmann, Brad Laner, Bruce Licher and Ethan Port, except where noted.

No.	Title	Writer(s)	Length
1.	"So It Is Written"		3:06
2.	"Spice Fields"		5:40
3.	"Viva la Rock 'n' Roll" (Alternative TV cover)	Mark Perry, Chris Bennett, Dennis Burns	2:28
4.	"Tabula Rasa"		6:46
5.	"Il Papa Sympatico"		3:27
6.	"Pios den mila yia ti lambri"	Theodorakis	3:47
7.	"Lethal Musk"		4:11
8.	"Lebanon 2000"		3:40
9.	"Moujahadeen"		3:27
10.	"Jamahiriya"		7:22

Reissue bonus tracks
No.	Title	Writer(s)	Length
11.	"Il Papa Sympatico" (instrumental version)		3:26
12.	"Viva la Rock 'n' Roll" (instrumental version)	Perry, Bennett, Burns	2:33
13.	"Moujahadeen" (instrumental version)		3:31
14.	"[untitled]"		0:54

== Personnel ==
Adapted from the Jamahiriya Democratique et Populaire de Sauvage liner notes.

Savage Republic

- Philip Drucker (as Jackson Del Rey) – keyboards, guitar, percussion, vocals
- Thom Furhmann – bass guitar, guitar, vocals
- Greg Grunke – bass guitar, guitar, vocals
- Brad Laner – drums, keyboards, percussion
- Bruce Licher – monotone guitar, bass guitar, vocals, art direction
- Ethan Port – guitar, percussion, vocals

Production and additional personnel

- Vitus Mataré – production
- Abe Perlstein – photography
- Savage Republic – production

== Release history ==
Region	Date	Label	Format	Catalog
United States	1988	Fundamental	CD, CS, LP	SAVE 61
United States	2002	Mobilization	CD	MOB 103
