= Desolation Center =

Music and performing arts organization in Los Angeles

Desolation Center was an independent music and performing arts organization that held events in and around Los Angeles, California, in the early 1980s. It was organized by Stuart Swezey and included local and national punk musicians. After hosting an arts events series at downtown LA locations, the group held three legendary concerts, titled Mojave Exodus, in the Mojave Desert in 1983. The artists that performed there included Sonic Youth, Minutemen, Meat Puppets, Redd Kross, Einstürzende Neubauten, Survival Research Laboratories, Savage Republic, Swans, Boyd Rice, and Psi Com.

Desolation Center is the subject of a 2018 documentary film of the same name.
