= Tragic Figure =

EP by Savage Republic
- Released: 1984
- Recorded: March–August 1981
- Studio: University of California, Los Angeles, CA
- Genre: Post-punk, experimental rock
- Length: 8:53
- Label: Independent Project
- Producer: Savage Republic

Savage Republic chronology
| Tragic Figures (1982) | Tragic Figure (1984) | Trudge (1985) |

Tragic Figure is an EP by the American post-punk band Savage Republic, released in 1984 by Independent Project Records. It was later appended to reissues of the band's debut album Tragic Figures.

== Track listing ==
Side one
| No. | Title | Writer(s) | Length |
|---|---|---|---|
| 1. | "Tragic Figure" | Philip Drucker, Mark Erskine, Bruce Licher, Jeff Long | 4:12 |

Side two
| No. | Title | Writer(s) | Length |
|---|---|---|---|
| 1. | "The Empty Quarter" | Erskine, Long | 1:47 |
| 2. | "The Ivory Coast" | Drucker, Erskine, Licher, Long | 2:53 |

== Personnel ==
Adapted from the Tragic Figure liner notes.

Savage Republic

- Philip Drucker (as Jackson Del Rey) – guitar (A1), percussion (B2)
- Mark Erskine – drums
- Bruce Licher – vocals (A1), bass guitar (B2)
- Jeff Long – bass guitar (A1, B1), monotone guitar (B2)

== Release history ==
| Region | Date | Label | Format | Catalog |
|---|---|---|---|---|
| United States | 1984 | Independent Project | LP | IP 013 |
