= The Image Has Cracked =

Studio album by Alternative TV
- Released: May 1978
- Venue: 100 Club, London on 7 February 1978
- Studio: Surrey Sound, Surrey
- Genre: Punk rock
- Label: Deptford Fun City
- Producer: Alternative TV; Chris Gray

Alternative TV chronology
The Image Has Cracked (1978)	Vibing Up the Senile Man (Part One) (1979)

The Image Has Cracked is the debut studio album by English band Alternative TV. It was released in May 1978 by record label Deptford Fun City.

== Recording and content ==
The album's studio tracks were recorded at Surrey Sound Studios in Leatherhead, Surrey, and the album's live tracks were recorded live at the 100 Club in London on 7 February 1978.

Jools Holland plays synthesiser and piano on two tracks on the album.

== Reception ==
Professional ratings
Review scores
Source	Rating
AllMusic	4.5/5 stars
Classic Rock	4/5 stars

Trouser Press wrote: "Although the abstract stuff doesn't hold up so well, it's still an amazing document of a time and place." In his retrospective review, Ned Raggett of AllMusic called the album "an unfairly neglected classic from the late-'70s upheaval. Seizing on the promise of punk as being a new means of expression rather than a new set of musical rules to be adhered to, Perry, along with a solid-enough band, whip up a series of incendiary pieces that explore as much as they thrash [...] As an expression of going down defiant while punk became a new fashion, it's fierce and brilliant."

== Track listing ==
Side A
No.	Title	Writer(s)	Length
1.	"Alternatives"	Alex Fergusson, Mark Perry	9:43
2.	"Action Time Vision"	Alex Fergusson, Mark Perry	2:33
3.	"Why Don't You Do Me Right?"	Frank Zappa	3:12
4.	"Good Times"	Chris Bennett, Dennis Burns, Mark Perry, Tyrone Thomas	2:33
5.	"Still-Life"	Alex Fergusson, Mark Perry	5:22

Side B
No.	Title	Writer(s)	Length
1.	"Viva La Rock n' Roll"	Chris Bennett, Dennis Burns, Mark Perry	4:19
2.	"Nasty Little Lonely"	Chris Bennett, Dennis Burns, Mark Perry	6:22
3.	"Red"	Mark Perry	2:04
4.	"Splitting in Two"	Mark Perry	5:12

== Personnel ==
Alternative TV

- Mark Perry – vocals, guitar, production
- Dennis Burns – bass guitar, production
- Chris Bennett – drums, percussion, production

Additional personnel

- Jools Holland – Moog synthesizer on "Alternatives", piano on "Viva La Rock 'n' Roll"
- Kim Turner – "special assistance" rhythm guitar, piano

Technical

- Chris Gray – engineering, production
- Nigel Gray – engineering
- Steve Angel – mastering
- Jill Furmanovsky – cover design
- Harry T. Murlowski – sleeve photography
- Tony Stubbs – sleeve design (soapbox)
