= Live Trek 1985 - 1986 =

Live album by Savage Republic
- Released: 1987
- Recorded: 1985–1986
- Genre: Post-punk, experimental rock
- Length: 64:53
- Label: Fundamental

Savage Republic chronology
| Ceremonial (1985) | Live Trek 1985 - 1986 (1987) | Jamahiriya Democratique et Populaire de Sauvage (1988) |

Professional ratings
Review scores
| Source | Rating |
|---|---|
| AllMusic | 3/5 stars |
| New Musical Express | 4/10 |

Live Trek 1985 - 1986 is a live album by American post-punk band Savage Republic, released in 1987 by Fundamental Records.

== Track listing ==
| No. | Title | Writer(s) | Length |
|---|---|---|---|
| 1. | "The Ivory Coast" | Philip Drucker, Mark Erskine, Bruce Licher, Jeff Long | 3:28 |
| 2. | "Siege" | Erskine, Greg Grunke, Thom Furhmann, Licher, Ethan Port | 4:12 |
| 3. | "Trek" | Erskine, Grunke, Furhmann, Licher, Port | 6:13 |
| 4. | "Mobilization" | Drucker, Erskine, Licher, Long | 2:59 |
| 5. | "Last Grave at Dimbaza" | Drucker, Robert Loveless | 2:55 |
| 6. | "Dionysus" | Erskine, Grunke, Furhmann, Licher, Loveless, Port | 2:39 |
| 7. | "Attempted Coup : Madagascar" | Drucker, Erskine, Licher, Long | 3:38 |
| 8. | "Exodus" | Drucker, Erskine, Licher, Long | 5:59 |
| 9. | "Real Men" | Drucker, Erskine, Licher, Long | 3:21 |
| 10. | "Machinery" | Drucker, Erskine, Licher, Long | 3:10 |
| 11. | "Ceremonial" | Erskine, Grunke, Furhmann, Licher, Loveless, Port | 5:00 |
| 12. | "Assempbly" | Erskine, Grunke, Furhmann, Licher, Port | 4:43 |
| 13. | "Procession" | Drucker, Erskine, Licher, Long | 5:40 |
| 14. | "Sudoxe" | Drucker, Erskine, Licher, Long | 4:32 |
| 15. | "Spice Fields" | Erskine, Grunke, Furhmann, Licher, Port | 6:48 |
| 16. | "Year of Exile" | Erskine, Grunke, Furhmann, Licher, Loveless, Port | 9:36 |

== Personnel ==
Adapted from the Live Trek 1985 - 1986 liner notes.

Savage Republic

- Mark Erskine – instruments
- Thom Furhmann – instruments
- Greg Grunke – instruments
- Bruce Licher – instruments, design
- Robert Loveless – instruments
- Ethan Port – instruments

Production and additional personnel

- Annabelle Staunton – photography

== Release history ==
| Region | Date | Label | Format | Catalog |
|---|---|---|---|---|
| United States | 1987 | Fundamental | CD, LP | IP018 |
| United Kingdom | 1987 | Nate Starkman & Son | CS, LP | WE BUY 2 |
