= If Tomorrow I Were Leaving for Lhasa, I Wouldn't Stay a Minute More... =

Studio album by Red Temple Spirits
- Released: 1989
- Recorded: Motiv Studios (Los Angeles, CA)
- Genre: Post-punk, gothic rock, psychedelic rock
- Length: 51:50
- Label: Nate Starkman & Son/Fundamental
- Producer: Red Temple Spirits

Red Temple Spirits chronology
Dancing to Restore an Eclipsed Moon (1988)	If Tomorrow I Were Leaving for Lhasa, I Wouldn't Stay a Minute More... (1989)

If Tomorrow I Were Leaving for Lhasa, I Wouldn't Stay a Minute More... is the second studio album by American post-punk band Red Temple Spirits. It was released in 1989 on the Nate Starkman & Son label, a subsidiary of Fundamental.

== Track listing ==
All tracks are written by Red Temple Spirits, except as noted.

No.	Title	Writer(s)	Length
1.	"City of Millions"		3:58
2.	"Soft Machine"		4:02
3.	"Dive in Deep"		4:04
4.	"Alice"		4:23
5.	"Wild Hills"		7:03
6.	"A Black Rain"		6:06
7.	"Meltdown"		3:24
8.	"Confusion"		2:26
9.	"Rainbows End"		5:05
10.	"Set the Controls for the Heart of the Sun" (Pink Floyd cover)	Roger Waters	7:10
11.	"Rollercoaster" (13th Floor Elevators cover)	Roky Erickson, Tommy Hall	4:05

Track 11 only appeared on the CD issue.

== Critical reception ==
Professional ratings
Review scores
Source	Rating
Allmusic	4.5/5 stars

== Personnel ==
Adapted from the If Tomorrow I Were Leaving for Lhasa, I Wouldn't Stay a Minute More... liner notes.

Red Temple Spirits

- William Faircloth – vocals, production
- Dino Paredes – bass guitar, production
- Thomas Pierik – drums, production
- Dallas Taylor – guitar, production

Production and additional personnel

- Biff Sanders – assistant production

== Release history ==
Region	Date	Label	Format	Catalog
United States	1989	Fundamental	CD, CS, LP	SAVE 75
Germany	2014	Mannequin	LP	MNQ 048
