= The Millions (band) =

American alternative rock band

- Origin: Lincoln, Nebraska, United States
- Genres: Indie rock, alternative rock
- Years active: 1989–1995; 2012-present
- Labels: Smash Records, Dream Circle Records
- Members: Lori Allison; Marty Amsler; Harry Dingman III; Brandon McKenzie
- Past members: Greg Hill; Mike Keeling; Benjamin Kushner

The Millions were an alternative rock band from Lincoln, Nebraska, that included members of For Against and New Brass Guns. They were the first Lincoln band to be signed to a major label in more than two decades. The band released two albums, M is for Millions (1991, Smash Records) and Raquel (1994, Dream Circle Records), before disbanding in 1995.

== Formation ==
After completing a tour in support of the 1987 album Echelons, For Against returned to the studio to record their follow-up album, December. During the recording, guitarist Harry Dingman and drummer Greg Hill left the band. Dingman and bassist Marty Amsler began collaborating after the demise of Amsler's band, New Brass Guns, in 1989. The pair invited Amsler's former bandmate, Lori Allison, to sing vocals for their new songs. Hill was brought in on drums to complete the lineup of what would become The Millions.

== M is for Millions ==
Having achieved modest success on an independent label with For Against, Dingman immediately set his sights on a major label. After first focusing on building a Midwest fan base, the band sent demos to several major labels across the country before signing with Chicago-based Smash Records, a subsidiary of PolyGram.

Within months of signing with PolyGram, the band was given a schedule to record its first album, M is for Millions. The label assigned Canadian producer Terry Brown, best known for producing albums by progressive rock band Rush as well as "(I Just) Died in Your Arms", the biggest hit from British pop band Cutting Crew. The band would eventually feel that Brown had been a bad fit.

The album's lead single, "Sometimes," performed well on the CMJ charts, but the band immediately felt frustrations with their label. Fans would express their inability to find copies of the album at retailers. Dingman said the label's merchandising decisions puzzled the band.

== Raquel ==
Health problems, deaths of friends and family, and other stresses led the band to begin writing much darker material for its second album, Raquel.

German fans circulated some demos to record labels in their home country, and several European labels contacted the band. The Millions would end up signing with DreamCircle, and independent German label. The band was encouraged by the label owner's attitude that they produce the album how they wished—a stark contrast to the experience with PolyGram and Brown. During that time, in 1993, the band would also add a fifth member, Benjamin Kushner, on guitar.

The band recorded Raquel with producer Eric Medley and mixer Lee Popa, who had previously worked with bands like The Replacements and Killing Joke. They toured Europe with Sheryl Crow, including an opportunity to play two encores as the opening band at a show in Berlin.

After returning from the Raquel tour in 1994, Amsler decided to leave the band to focus on his career outside of music; he was replaced by Mike Keeling.

The band continued writing and touring for a third album, including drawing the attention of a Warner Bros. Records subsidiary. But internal tensions fueled by exhaustion and the lack of any meaningful break led the band to break up before the album could be recorded.

== Post-Millions and reunion ==
Allison would go on to perform with Lincoln bands Junior Mighty and Floating Opera. Dingman rejoined For Against in 2004. Keeling continued to perform with The Self-Righteous Brothers, subsequently joining Drive-By Honky and then Ideal Cleaners. Hill retired from music.

In late 2012, original members Allison, Amsler and Dingman began rehearsing with drummer Brandon McKenzie for a show to celebrate the release of Poison Fish, a 21-track disc of rarities.
