= Abecedarians (band) =

US post-punk band

- Origin: Newport Beach, California, United States
- Genres: New wave, experimental, post-punk
- Years active: 1983-95
- Labels: Factory, Caroline, Independent Project Records
- Past members: Chris Manecke; John Blake; Kevin Dolan

Abecedarians were an American, Los Angeles–based post-punk trio, active in the mid to late 1980s. The lineup consisted of Chris Manecke (guitar, vocals, keyboards), Kevin Dolan (drums) and John Blake (bass). They specialized in sparse, guitar-driven post-punk, though their most well-known song, "Smiling Monarchs", is alternative dance in the vein of New Order, and was in fact mixed by that band's guitar player and vocalist, Bernard Sumner.

== Discography ==
- 1985: "Smiling Monarchs"/"Benway's Carnival" (single, Factory Records)
- 1986: Eureka (mini-LP, Southwest Audio Reproductions)
- 1987: Eureka (re-release, Caroline Records)
- 1988: Resin (LP, Carlina Records)
- 1988: AB-CD (CD, Carlina Records)
- 1990: The Other Side Of The Fence (Independent Project Records) - recordings from 1983 to 1985
- 2012: Eureka (re-release, Pylon)

An instrumental edit of "Soil" (from Eureka) was used in the 1987 film Billabong: Surf Into Summer. "They Said Tomorrow" (from The Other Side of the Fence) appeared on Trance Port Tapes' L.A. Mantra II in 1984 and its Calypso Now reissue in 1985. It was also used on Geffen Records' Scream: The Compilation in 1987. Abecedarians' single "Smiling Monarchs" appeared on more compilation albums than any of their other songs: Hardest Hits Volume Two (SPG Music, 1992); Voices In The Air (Wavestation, 1993); Too Young To Know, Too Wild To Care...1978–1992 The Factory Story Part One (London Records, 1997); and Auteur Labels: Factory Records 1984 (Les Temps Modernes, 2009). "Benway's Carnival" appeared on Les Temps Modernes' 2010 Auteur Labels: Independent Project Records CD.
