= Recordings From Live Performance, 1981 - 1983 =

Recordings From Live Performance, 1981 – 1983

Live album by Savage Republic
- Released: 1992
- Recorded: May 31, 1981 – March 30, 1983
- Genre: Post-punk, experimental rock
- Length: 53:13
- Label: Independent Project

Savage Republic chronology
ΝΗΠΙΑΓΩΓΕΙΟΝ: Live in Europe 1988 (1990)	Recordings From Live Performance, 1981 – 1983 (1992)	Complete Studio Box Set (2002)

Professional ratings
Review scores
Source	Rating
AllMusic	2/5 stars

Recordings From Live Performance, 1981 – 1983 is a live album by the American post-punk band Savage Republic, released in 1992 by Independent Project Records.

== Track listing ==
All tracks are written by Savage Republic, except "Surfin' With the Shah" by John Talley-Jones.

Side 1
No.	Title	Length
1.	"Exodus"	5:17
2.	"Machinery"	4:20
3.	"Mobilization"	3:13

Side 2
No.	Title	Length
1.	"Kill the Fascists!"	2:23
2.	"Attempted Ivory Coast/The Ivory Coast"	3:43
3.	"Procession"	6:39

Side 3
No.	Title	Length
1.	"Real Men"	2:59
2.	"Snakedance"	6:00
3.	"Tragic Figure"	4:54

Side 4
No.	Title	Length
1.	"So It Is Written"	3:03
2.	"Surfin' With the Shah" (Urinals cover)	2:33
3.	"Flesh That Walks"	3:21
4.	"When All Else Fails.../ Distorted Coup : Madagascar"	4:48

== Personnel ==
Adapted from the Recordings From Live Performance, 1981 – 1983 liner notes.

Savage Republic

- Philip Drucker (as Jackson Del Rey) – percussion (A1, A3, B1–B3, D4), vocals (B1, D1, D3, D4), guitar (C2, C3, D3), monotone guitar (A2)
- Mark Erskine – drums
- Bruce Licher – bass guitar (A2, A3, B2, B3, C2, D2–D4), vocals (A2, B1, C3, D3), monotone guitar (A1, D1), percussion (B1, C1), backing vocals (B3), design
- Jeff Long – bass guitar (A1, B3, C1, C3, D1, D3), vocals (B3, C1, D3), monotone guitar (A3, B2)
- Robert Loveless – keyboards (A1, C2, D1)

Additional musicians

- Kendra Smith – percussion (A2, B1, D4), bass guitar (D4)

Production and additional personnel

- Edward Batt – photography
- Eddy Schreyer – mastering

== Release history ==
Region	Date	Label	Format	Catalog
United States	1992	Independent Project	LP	IP 038
United States	2002	Independent Project	CD	IP 038
