= Varvakios =

Studio album by Savage Republic
- Released: August 23, 2012
- Recorded: February 14 – February 16, 2012
- Studio: Sub Noise Studio, Athens
- Genre: Post-punk, experimental rock
- Length: 39:04
- Label: LTM
- Producer: Savage Republic

Savage Republic chronology
Procession: An Aural History (2010)	Varvakios (2012)	Aegean (2014)

Professional ratings
Review scores
Source	Rating
AllMusic	3.5/5 stars

Varvakios is the sixth studio album by American post-punk band Savage Republic. It was released on August 23, 2012 by LTM Recordings.

== Track listing ==
All tracks are written by Savage Republic.

No.	Title	Length
1.	"Sparta"	6:30
2.	"Hippodrome"	4:21
3.	"Varvakios"	3:36
4.	"Pigadi"	4:59
5.	"Kara"	5:42
6.	"Poros"	6:23
7.	"For Eva"	1:41
8.	"Anatolia"	5:53

== Personnel ==
Adapted from the Varvakios liner notes.

Savage Republic

- Kerry Dowling – instruments
- Thom Fuhrmann – instruments, recording, design
- Ethan Port – instruments
- Alan Waddington – instruments

Additional musicians

- Blaine L. Reininger – violin

Production and additional personnel

- Ramona Clarke – design
- Bruce Licher – cover art
- Nick Paleologos – photography
- Savage Republic – production
- Don C. Tyler – mastering

== Release history ==
Region	Date	Label	Format	Catalog
United Kingdom	2012	LTM	CD	MOB110
United States	2012		LP	SR 001
