= Kommunity FK =

American rock band

- Origin: California, US
- Genres: Deathrock, gothic rock, post-punk
- Years active: 1978–present
- Labels: Independent Project Records; Cleopatra Records; Mobilization Records; Invisible Records; KommunityPM Rekords; Crysella Records
- Members: Patrick Mata; Sherry Rubber
- Past members: Matt Chaikin; CE CE; Kevin Kipnis; Margaret Arana; Gahdi Elias; Mark Pritchard; Cam Campbell; Eddie Branch; Dave Roberts; Heather Dunham; Jack Atlantis
- Website: kommunityfk.com

Kommunity FK is an American post-punk/gothic rock band which formed in 1978. The band helped establish what came to be known as the deathrock scene in Los Angeles.

== History ==
The band was formed in 1978 by singer Patrick Mata, who was influenced by musicians Throbbing Gristle, David Bowie and Joy Division as well as other artistic inspirations like Dadaism, anti-art, noise, musique concrète and the Brion Gysin/William Burroughs cut-up technique.

Though initially named "Kommunity Fuck", after a piece of paste-up art created by Mata, the moniker was soon shortened. Mata has stated that the name was inspired by rejections from unimaginative local media venue talent buyers and industry powers.

Kommunity FK's debut album, The Vision and the Voice, was released in 1983 by Independent Project Records, featuring a lineup of Mata, drummer Matt Chaikin and bassist CE CE.

The follow-up, 1985's Close One Sad Eye, garnered significant attention when a video clip for the song "Something Inside Me Has Died" received significant play on MTV. By this time, Mata and Chaikin had been joined by bassist Kevin Kipnis and keyboardist Margaret Arana.

After departing the band, Chaikin became the drummer for an early lineup of Jane's Addiction.

Later Kommunity FK lineups included bassists Cam Campbell (A II Z, Sex Gang Children), Eddie Branch (UK Decay, Furyo, Peter Murphy) and Dave Roberts (Sex Gang Children, Carcrash International).

In 2008, Kommunity FK returned with their third effort, the collection Abandoned Here... Planet Ruled By Bastards, issued on the Invisible Records label. Now a duo of Mata and guitarist/keyboardist Sherry Rubber, they followed it up with La Santisima Muerte (2010) on KommunityPM Rekords and Thee Image & Thee Myth (2015) on Crysella Records.

During a Kommunity FK hiatus in the late 1980s and early 1990s, Mata led the band Sativa Luvbox, who released two albums: The Bad Sleep Well (1989, Splat-Co Records) and Beloved Satellite (1993, Gasoline Alley Records). Mata had earlier issued a 1979 single, "The Queen of Beverly Hills," under his own name. Using the name Texylvania, he also covered songs on several tribute albums.

== Discography ==
=== Studio albums ===
- The Vision and the Voice (1983, Independent Project Records; 1994, Cleopatra Records; 2006, Mobilization Records)
- Close One Sad Eye (1985, Independent Project Records; 1993, Cleopatra Records)
- La Santisima Muerte (2010, KommunityPM Rekords)
- Thee Image & Thee Myth (2015, Crysella Records)

=== EPs ===
- 5 Song Free Sampler (2008, Invisible Records)

=== Compilation albums ===
- Abandoned Here... Planet Ruled By Bastards (1979-2008) (2008, Invisible Records)

=== Compilation appearances ===
- "Let's Die" on Mystic Sampler #1 (1984, Mystic Records)
- "Poisoning" on Radio Tokyo Tapes - Volume Two (1984, Ear Movie Records/Enigma Records)
- "Something Inside Me Has Died (Remix)" on Scream (The Compilation) (1984, Geffen Records)
- "Is It Your Face" on Viva Los Angeles II (1990, Viva Records)
- "Junkies" on The Whip (1993, Cleopatra Records)
- "Something Inside Me Has Died" on Art of Gothic (1994, Talitha Records)
- "We Will Not Fall" on Gothik: Music from the Dark Side (1995, Cleopatra Records)
- "Dr. Jekyll and Mr. Hyde" (The Damned cover) on Children of the Damned (1996, Apollyon)
- "Hang on to Yourself" (David Bowie cover) on Goth Oddity - A Tribute to David Bowie (1998, Cleopatra Records)
- "23rd Curse" on Witchcraft: A Gothic Compilation (1999, Cleopatra Records)
- "Undulate (The Devil in the Belfry)" on Songs of Terror - A Gothic Tribute to Edgar Allan Poe (2001, Cleopatra Records)
- "To Blame" on A Life Less Lived (The Gothic Box) (2006, Rhino Records)
- "We Will Not Fall" on Kaliffornian Deathrock (2006, Strobelight)
- "We Will Not Fall" and "Tribulations" on Mobilization - Archive Series 2009 Sampler (2009, Mobilization Records)

== Members ==
Current members

- Patrick Mata – vocals, guitar, bass, keyboards
- Brian Keith – bass
- Tom Coyne (45 Grave) – drums
- Thin Man - keyboards, synth

Former members

- Matt Chaikin – drums
- CE CE – bass
- Kevin Kipnis – bass
- Margaret Arana – keyboards
- Gadhi Elias – keyboards, backing vocals
- Kevin Barnhill - bass
- Mark Pritchard – guitar
- Cam Campbell – bass
- Eddie Branch – bass
- Dave Roberts – bass
- Heather Dunham – bass
- Jack Atlantis – synth, samples)
- Dave Bats – bass
- Jeffrey P. - bass
- Johnny Indovina – bass
- Christian Omar Madrigal Izzo – drums
- Shane Talada – synth, samples
- Eric Blitz - drums
- Julian Martinez – drums, electronic drums
- Larry Rainwater (Ex-VoTo) - bass
- Christopher Mele - drums, electric drums
- Sherry Rubber - guitar, backing vocals, synth
- Linda Rainwater (Ex-VoTo) - keyboards
- Dee Madden (Ex-VoTo, Penal Colony) - guitar, drums/synth programming
