= Complete Studio Box Set =

Compilation album by Savage Republic
- Released: 2002
- Recorded: July 1981 – November 13, 1988
- Genre: Post-punk, experimental rock
- Length: 217:45
- Label: Mobilization

Savage Republic chronology
Recordings From Live Performance, 1981 - 1983 (1992)	Complete Studio Box Set (2002)	1938 (2007)

Professional ratings
Review scores
Source	Rating
AllMusic	4.5/5 stars

Complete Studio Box Set is an anthology box set by American post-punk band Savage Republic, released in 2002 by Mobilization Records.

== Track listing ==
Disc 1 – Tragic Figures
No.	Title	Length
1.	"When All Else Fails"	3:03
2.	"Attempted Coup : Madagascar"	2:55
3.	"The Ivory Coast"	3:12
4.	"Next to Nothing"	3:23
5.	"Exodus"	5:47
6.	"On the Prowl"	1:38
7.	"Machinery"	3:16
8.	"Zulu Zulu"	0:32
9.	"Real Men"	3:15
10.	"Flesh That Walks"	3:19
11.	"Kill the Fascists!"	2:12
12.	"Procession"	6:05
13.	"Film Noir"	3:30
14.	"O Andonis"	2:08
15.	"Mobilization"	3:21
16.	"Tragic Figure"	4:12
17.	"The Empty Quarter"	1:47
18.	"The Ivory Coast"	2:54

Disc 2 – Ceremonial + Trudge
No.	Title	Length
1.	"Trudge"	7:16
2.	"Trek"	8:21
3.	"Siege"	4:21
4.	"Assembly"	4:43
5.	"Valetta"	3:31
6.	"Andelusia"	5:40
7.	"Walking Backwards"	3:44
8.	"1000 Days"	3:35
9.	"Mediterranea"	3:49
10.	"Dionysius"	2:46
11.	"Ceremonial"	6:23
12.	"Year of Exile"	9:31
13.	"Land of Delusion"	2:24

Disc 3 – Jamahiriya Democratique et Populaire de Sauvage
No.	Title	Length
1.	"So It Is Written"	3:06
2.	"Spice Fields"	5:40
3.	"Viva la Rock 'n' Roll"	2:28
4.	"Tabula Rasa"	6:46
5.	"Il Papa Sympatico"	3:27
6.	"Pios den mila yia ti lambri"	3:47
7.	"Lethal Musk"	4:11
8.	"Lebanon 2000"	3:40
9.	"Moujahadeen"	3:27
10.	"Jamahiriya"	7:22
11.	"Il Papa Sympatico" (Instrumental mix)	3:26
12.	"Viva la Rock 'n' Roll" (Instrumental mix)	2:33
13.	"Moujahadeen" (Instrumental mix)	3:31
14.	"[untitled]"	0:55

Disc 4 – Customs
No.	Title	Length
1.	"Sucker Punch"	5:25
2.	"Sono Cairo"	4:58
3.	"Mapia"	4:50
4.	"The Birds of Pork"	6:28
5.	"Rapeman's First EP"	8:38
6.	"The World (At Our Fingertips)"	2:36
7.	"Song for Adonis"	1:31
8.	"Archetype"	6:31

== Release history ==
Region	Date	Label	Format	Catalog
United States	2002	Mobilization	CD	MOB105
