= Dancing to Restore an Eclipsed Moon =

Studio album by Red Temple Spirits
- Released: 1988
- Recorded: Motiv Studios (Los Angeles, CA)
- Genre: Post-punk, gothic rock, psychedelic rock
- Length: 63:29
- Label: Nate Starkman & Son/Fundamental
- Producer: Dave Peterson

Red Temple Spirits chronology
Dancing to Restore an Eclipsed Moon (1988)	If Tomorrow I Were Leaving for Lhasa, I Wouldn't Stay a Minute More... (1989)

Dancing to Restore an Eclipsed Moon is the debut studio album of American post-punk band Red Temple Spirits. It was released in 1988 on the Nate Starkman & Son label, a subsidiary of Fundamental.

== Track listing ==
All tracks are written by Red Temple Spirits, except by "The Nile Song" by Roger Waters.

No.	Title	Length
1.	"Exorcism/Waiting for the Sun"	6:58
2.	"Liquid Temple"	5:34
3.	"Dark Spirits"	4:16
4.	"Bear Cave"	4:12
5.	"Dreamings Ending"	4:47
6.	"Electric Flowers"	5:00
7.	"Moonlight"	5:28
8.	"Where Merlin Played"	5:41
9.	"The Nile Song" (Pink Floyd cover)	3:12
10.	"Lost in Dreaming"	4:41
11.	"Light of Christ/This Hollow Ground"	13:33

== Critical reception ==
Professional ratings
Review scores
Source	Rating
Allmusic	3/5 stars

== Personnel ==
Adapted from the Dancing to Restore an Eclipsed Moon liner notes.

Red Temple Spirits

- William Faircloth – vocals
- Dino Paredes – bass guitar
- Thomas Pierik – drums
- Dallas Taylor – guitar

Production and additional personnel

- Lowell F. Ford – photography
- Dave Peterson – production
- Biff Sanders – engineering

== Release history ==
Region	Date	Label	Format	Catalog
United States	1988	Fundamental	CD, CS, LP	SAVE 74
Germany	2014	Mannequin	LP	MNQ 047
