= Aegean =

Aegean may refer to:

- Aegean Sea
- Aegean Islands
- Aegean region (geographical), Turkey
- Aegean region (statistical), Turkey
- North Aegean, region of Greece
- South Aegean, region of Greece
- Aegean civilizations
- Aegean languages, a group of ancient languages and proposed language family
- Aegean Sea (theme), a naval theme of the Byzantine Empire
- Aegean Airlines
- Aegean Records, independent record label founded by singer and songwriter George Michael
- University of the Aegean, a university based in Mytilene, Greece
- Ege University, a university based in İzmir, Turkey
- Aegean cat, a cat breed from Greece
- Aegean (album)
- Aegean dispute
- Aegean (stage), part of the Triassic system in stratigraphy
- Aegean Contagion, an alternate name to the euro area crisis with reference to its point of origin and a general term for an epidemic

== See also ==
- Archipelago
- Aegean Macedonia, a term for the Greek region of Macedonia
- Aegean Thrace, a term for the Greek region of Thrace
