= Ceremonial (Savage Republic album) =

Studio album by Savage Republic
- Released: December 1985
- Recorded: 1985
- Studio: Evan Williams Studio, Santa Ana, CA
- Genre: Post-punk, experimental rock
- Length: 37:54
- Label: Independent Project/Fundamental
- Producer: Bruce Licher, Robert Loveless

Savage Republic chronology
Trudge (1985)	Ceremonial (1985)	Live Trek 1985 - 1986 (1987)

Professional ratings
Review scores
Source	Rating
AllMusic	4.5/5 stars

Ceremonial is the second studio album by the American post-punk band Savage Republic, released in 1985 by Independent Project Records and Fundamental Records. It has been remixed and reissued, since 1990, accompanied by the Trudge EP. All CD issues contain only the instrumental versions of the songs.

== Track listing ==
All music is composed by Mark Erskine, Thom Furhmann, Greg Grunke, Bruce Licher, Robert Loveless and Ethan Port.

Side one
No.	Title	Lyrics	Length
1.	"Andelusia"	Louise Bialik, Loveless, Port	5:40
2.	"Walking Backwards"	Loveless, Port	3:44
3.	"1000 Days"	Erskine, Loveless, Port	3:35
4.	"Mediterranea"		3:49
5.	"Dionysius"	Loveless, Port	2:46

Side two
No.	Title	Length
1.	"Ceremonial"	6:23
2.	"Year of Exile"	9:31
3.	"Land of Delusion"	2:23

1990 CD issue track listing
No.	Title	Length
1.	"Trek"	8:21
2.	"Siege"	4:21
3.	"Assembly"	4:43
4.	"Trudge"	7:16
5.	"Andelusia"	5:40
6.	"Walking Backwards"	3:44
7.	"1000 Days"	3:35
8.	"Mediterranea"	3:49
9.	"Dionysius"	2:46
10.	"Ceremonial" (Intro)	1:22
11.	"Ceremonial"	5:09
12.	"Year of Exile"	9:31
13.	"Land of Delusion"	2:24

== Personnel ==
Adapted from the Ceremonial liner notes.

Savage Republic

- Mark Erskine – drums, percussion, bongos, vocals
- Thom Furhmann – trombone, bass guitar
- Greg Grunke – guitar, bass guitar, dulcimer
- Bruce Licher – guitar, bass guitar, percussion, vocals, production
- Robert Loveless – vocals, keyboards, mandolin, percussion, production
- Ethan Port – guitar, percussion, vocals

Additional musicians

- Louise Bialik – vocals (A1)

Production and additional personnel

- Mark Coffin – recording
- Scott Sing – photography
- Gary Stern – recording
- Evan Williams – recording, mixing

== Release history ==
Region	Date	Label	Format	Catalog
United States	1985	Independent Project	LP	IP018
United Kingdom	1985	Fundamental	LP	SAVE 22
International	1990	Fundamental	CD	SAVE 22
