= 1938 (album) =

Studio album by Savage Republic
- Released: October 23, 2007
- Recorded: 322, Pomona, CA; Wormhole Studios, Upland, CA
- Genre: Post-punk, experimental rock
- Length: 68:28
- Label: Neurot
- Producer: Thom Fuhrmann

Savage Republic chronology
Complete Studio Box Set (2002)	1938 (2007)	Procession: An Aural History (2010)

1938 is the fifth studio album by American post-punk band Savage Republic, released on October 23, 2007 by Neurot Recordings.

== Track listing ==
All tracks are written by Savage Republic.

No.	Title	Length
1.	"1938"	6:53
2.	"Marshal Tito"	3:09
3.	"Anemone"	2:42
4.	"Monsoon"	2:42
5.	"Siam"	8:20
6.	"Caravan"	17:03
7.	"Song for Rikki"	4:21
8.	"White Ginger"	2:46
9.	"Torpedo"	2:40
10.	"Breslau"	2:21
11.	"Marshal Vito"	3:18
12.	"Zelo"	3:44
13.	"Peking"	8:29

== Personnel ==
Adapted from the 1938 liner notes.

Savage Republic

- Thom Fuhrmann – instruments, production, design
- Greg Grunke – instruments
- Val Haller – instruments
- Ethan Port – instruments
- Alan Waddington – instruments

Additional musicians

- Julia Zuker – violin (on "Caravan", "White Ginger" and "Peking")
- Bryan Taylor – drums (on "Song For Rikki")
- Tara Tavi – yang qin (on "Peking")
- John Crawford – shakers (on "Torpedo")

Production and design

- Ramona Clarke – photography, design
- Jon Crawford – recording
- Kerry Dowling – recording
- Reni Tulsi – recording
- Don C. Tyler – mastering

== Release history ==
Region	Date	Label	Format	Catalog
United States	2007	Neurot	CD	NR-053
