= The Vision and the Voice (album) =

Studio album by Kommunity FK
- Released: 1983
- Recorded: 1982
- Genre: Post-punk; gothic rock
- Length: 41:25
- Label: Independent Project
- Producer: Patrick Mata

Kommunity FK chronology
The Vision and the Voice (1983)	Close One Sad Eye (1985)

The Vision and the Voice is the debut studio album by American rock band Kommunity FK, released in 1983 by Independent Project Records. It was later reissued in 1994 by Cleopatra Records and again in 2006 by Mobilization Records.

== Reception ==
Professional ratings
Review scores
Source	Rating
AllMusic	3/5 stars
Trouser Press	favourable

Trouser Press called it "an excellent album, starting with its Boschian cover art depicting naked figures cavorting and fornicating around a giant red penis."

== Track listing ==
No.	Title	Length
1.	"Unknown to You"	4:16
2.	"We Will Not Fall"	4:39
3.	"Tribulations"	3:44
4.	"Anti-Pop"	2:49
5.	"To Blame"	5:26
6.	"Nothing Yet"	3:34
7.	"Incompatible Disposition"	2:49
8.	"Bullets"	1:43
9.	"No Fear"	5:14
10.	"Restrictions"	5:09
11.	"Fuck the Kommunity"	2:02
