= Close One Sad Eye =

Studio album by Kommunity FK
- Released: 1985
- Recorded: 1984
- Genre: Gothic rock; darkwave
- Length: 35:30
- Label: Independent Project
- Producer: Patrick Mata

Kommunity FK chronology
The Vision and the Voice (1983)	Close One Sad Eye (1985)	Abandoned Here... Planet Ruled by Bastards (2008)

Professional ratings
Review scores
Source	Rating
AllMusic	4/5 stars

Close One Sad Eye is the second album by the American rock band Kommunity FK, released in 1985 by Independent Project Records. It was reissued in 1993 by Cleopatra Records.

== Track listing ==
No.	Title	Length
1.	"Something Inside Me Has Died"	3:45
2.	"The Other World"	3:22
3.	"Debauchery"	3:33
4.	"Junkies"	3:59
5.	"Trollops"	3:33
6.	"The Vision and the Voice"	3:03
7.	"Haunt"	3:29
8.	"You and Eye"	2:54
9.	"They"	3:07
10.	"Noob"	4:28
