= Tragic Figures =

Studio album by Savage Republic
- Released: June 1982
- Recorded: July 1981–March 1982
- Studio: Radio Tokyo, Venice, CA
- Genre: Post-punk, experimental rock
- Length: 37:05
- Label: Independent Project

Savage Republic chronology
Tragic Figures (1982)	Tragic Figure (1984)

Professional ratings
Review scores
Source	Rating
AllMusic	3/5 stars
Robert Christgau	B

Tragic Figures is the debut studio album by American post-punk band Savage Republic, released in 1982 by Independent Project. The reissue version was augmented with the 1982 single "Film Noir" and the 1984 EP Tragic Figure, among other bonus tracks.

The sleeve design, by Bruce Licher, features a photograph of the revolutionary government executing Iranian Kurds on August 24, 1979. The photographer, Jahangir Razmi, won a Pulitzer Prize anonymously but was able to reveal himself in 2006.

== Track listing ==
All tracks are written by Philip Drucker, Mark Erskine, Bruce Licher and Jeff Long.

Side one
No.	Title	Length
1.	"When All Else Fails"	3:03
2.	"Attempted Coup : Madagascar"	2:55
3.	"The Ivory Coast"	3:12
4.	"Next to Nothing"	3:23
5.	"Exodus"	5:47

Side two
No.	Title	Length
1.	"Machinery"	3:16
2.	"Zulu Zulu"	0:32
3.	"Real Men"	3:15
4.	"Flesh That Walks"	3:19
5.	"Kill the Fascists!"	2:12
6.	"Procession"	6:05

1987 CD reissue bonus tracks
No.	Title	Writer(s)	Length
1.	"When All Else Fails"		3:03
2.	"Attempted Coup : Madagascar"		2:55
3.	"The Ivory Coast"		3:12
4.	"Next to Nothing"		3:23
5.	"Exodus"		5:47
6.	"On the Prowl"		1:38
7.	"Machinery"		3:16
8.	"Zulu Zulu"		0:32
9.	"Real Men"		3:15
10.	"Flesh That Walks"		3:19
11.	"Kill the Fascists!"		2:12
12.	"Procession"		6:05
13.	"Film Noir" (from Film Noir 7")		3:30
14.	"O Andonis" (from Film Noir 7")	Mikis Theodorakis	2:08
15.	"Mobilization" (from The Best of the Radio Tokyo Tapes compilation)		3:21
16.	"Tragic Figure" (from Tragic Figure EP)		4:12
17.	"The Empty Quarter" (from Tragic Figure EP)		1:47
18.	"The Ivory Coast" (from Tragic Figure EP)		2:53

== Personnel ==
Adapted from the Tragic Figures liner notes.

Savage Republic

- Philip Drucker (as Jackson Del Rey) – guitar, percussion, vocals
- Mark Erskine – drums, vocals
- Bruce Licher – vocals, guitar, bass guitar, percussion
- Jeff Long – bass guitar, guitar, percussion, vocals

Production and additional personnel

- John Golden – mastering
- Ethan James – engineering

== Release history ==
Region	Date	Label	Format	Catalog
United States	1982	Independent Project	CS, LP	IP 004
United States	1987	Fundamental	CD, LP	SAVE 21
United States	1990	Fundamental	CD	SAVE 21
United States	1994	Independent Project	CD	IP 004
United States	2002	Mobilization	CD	MOB 101

== In other media ==
The song Real Men is used in the Silence of the Lambs (film) when Catherine Martin captures Jame Gumb's pet dog and threatens to kill it before Clarice Starling arrives.
