= Aegean (album) =

Studio album by Savage Republic
- Released: March 23, 2014
- Recorded: Interstellar Studios, Upland, CA
- Genre: Post-punk, experimental rock
- Length: 63:45
- Label: Mobilization
- Producer: Savage Republic

Savage Republic chronology
Varvakios (2012)	Aegean (2014)

Aegean is the seventh studio album by American post-punk band Savage Republic, released on March 23, 2014 by Mobilization Records.

== Track listing ==
All tracks are written by Savage Republic.

No.	Title	Length
1.	"Victory"	3:29
2.	"27 Days"	3:27
3.	"2 Ships II"	0:36
4.	"El Porto"	3:49
5.	"Thessally I"	2:07
6.	"Barbizon Exposure"	2:15
7.	"Arci Kroen"	5:42
8.	"Aegean"	7:13
9.	"Helena"	0:34
10.	"Bedouin"	3:21
11.	"Pio Pico"	3:23
12.	"Salonika"	3:14
13.	"Peloponessia"	4:15
14.	"Thessaly II"	1:42
15.	"Exarchia"	1:41
16.	"Omonoia"	4:49
17.	"2 Ships I"	0:55
18.	"Sons and Lovers"	3:10
19.	"The Arab Spring"	8:03

== Personnel ==
Adapted from the Aegean liner notes.

Savage Republic

- Kerry Dowling – instruments
- Thom Fuhrmann – instruments, recording, design
- Ethan Port – instruments
- Alan Waddington – instruments

Additional musicians

- Adrian Carrillo – trombone (1, 11)
- Emad Gabra – cümbüş (6, 19)
- Greg Grunke – guitar (8)
- Hayden Ortiz – trumpet (1, 11)
- Stella Papandreopoulou – vocals (8)
- Blaine L. Reininger – violin (12, 19)

Production and additional personnel

- Jon Crawford – recording
- Bruce Licher – design
- Giorgos Nikas – painting
- Nick Paleologos – recording
- Akis Paschalidis – recording
- Savage Republic – production
- Don C. Tyler – mastering

== Release history ==
Region	Date	Label	Format	Catalog
United States	2014	Mobilization	CD	MOB110
