= Mannequin Records =

German record label

- Founded: 2008
- Founder: Alessandro Adriani, Carlo Cassaro
- Genre: Post-punk, coldwave, synthwave, EBM, Industrial
- Country of origin: Italy
- Location: Berlin
- Official website: Bandcamp

Mannequin Records is an independent record label. It was founded in Rome in 2008 by Alessandro Adriani and Carlo Cassaro. The label releases both vintage and contemporary music. It relocated to Berlin in 2013.

== Notable artists ==
Artists and groups whose work has been released or reissued by Mannequin Records include:

- Bourbonese Qualk
- Nocturnal Emissions
- JASSS
- Silent Servant
