= Customs (album) =

Studio album by Savage Republic
- Released: 1989
- Recorded: November 11–13, 1988
- Studio: Recording Projects Studio, Thessaloniki
- Genre: Post-punk
- Length: 41:00
- Label: Fundamental
- Producer: George Manios, Savage Republic

Savage Republic chronology
Jamahiriya (1988)	Customs (1989)	ΝΗΠΙΑΓΩΓΕΙΟΝ: Live in Europe 1988 (1990)

Professional ratings
Review scores
Source	Rating
AllMusic	2/5 stars

Customs is the fourth studio album by American post-punk band Savage Republic, released in 1989 by Fundamental Records. It was reissued on Mobilization Records in 2002.

== Track listing ==
All tracks are written by Philip Drucker, Greg Grunke, Thom Furhmann, Brad Laner and Bruce Licher.

No.	Title	Length
1.	"Sucker Punch"	5:25
2.	"Sono Cairo"	4:58
3.	"Mapia"	4:50
4.	"The Birds of Pork"	6:28
5.	"Rapeman's First EP" (live)	8:38
6.	"The World (At Our Fingertips)"	2:36
7.	"Song for Adonis"	1:31
8.	"Archetype"	6:30

== Personnel ==
Adapted from the Customs liner notes.

Savage Republic

- Philip Drucker (as Jackson Del Rey) – guitar, vocals, percussion, saz, keyboards
- Thom Furhmann – guitar, bass guitar, vocals
- Greg Grunke – bass guitar, vocals, recorder, cümbüş
- Brad Laner – drums, percussion, keyboards, vocals
- Bruce Licher – bass guitar, guitar, percussion

Production and additional personnel

- Jimmy Bitzenis – mixing (8)
- George Manios – production, mixing (1–4, 6, 7)
- Savage Republic – production, mixing

== Release history ==
Region	Date	Label	Format	Catalog
United States	1988	Fundamental	CD, CS, LP	SAVE 71
United States	2002	Mobilization	CD	MOB 104
