= Trudge (EP) =

EP by Savage Republic
- Released: 1985
- Recorded: (Side A) December 22, 1984 at Lyceum Sound Studios (Side B) August 1985 at Motive Communication Studio
- Genre: Post-punk, experimental rock
- Length: 24:43
- Label: PIAS
- Producer: Savage Republic

Savage Republic chronology
Tragic Figure (1984)	Trudge (1985)	Ceremonial (1985)

Professional ratings
Review scores
Source	Rating
Allmusic	3/5 stars

Trudge is an EP by the American post-punk band Savage Republic, released in 1985 on PIAS Recordings. It has been reissued, since 1990, accompanied by Ceremonial.

== Track listing and personnel ==
All selections written by Mark Erskine, Thom Furhmann, Greg Grunke, Bruce Licher and Ethan Port.

Side one

1. "Trudge" - 7:16
  - Ethan Port - monotone guitar, chant, percussion
  - Greg Grunke - lead bass, chant
  - Bruce Licher - bass, lead vocals, percussion, chant
  - Mark Erskine - drums, chant

Side two

2. "Trek" - 8:21
  - Ethan Port - vocals, metal horn, shakers, percussion
  - Greg Grunke - monotone guitar
  - Thom Fuhrmann - keyboards
  - Bruce Licher - bass, percussion
  - Mark Erskine - drums, percussion
3. "Siege" - 4:21
  - Ethan Port - vocals, metal percussion
  - Greg Grunke - monotone guitar
  - Bruce Licher - lead bass, percussion
  - Thom Fuhrmann - bass
  - Mark Erskine - drums, percussion
4. "Assembly" - 4:43
  - Bruce Licher - monotone guitar, vocals
  - Greg Grunke - guitar
  - Thom Fuhrmann - keyboards, vocals, trombone
  - Mark Erskine - drums, percussion
  - Ethan Port - metal percussion

== Production and additional personnel ==
- Stephan Barbery – art direction
- Ethan James – mixing
- Savage Republic – production

== Release history ==
Region	Date	Label	Format	Catalog
Belgium	1985	PIAS	LP	BIAS 11
