= Alex Fergusson (musician) =

British musician (born 1952)

Alex Fergusson (born 16 December 1952, Glasgow, Scotland) is a Scottish musician.

Fergusson played guitar and wrote songs in The Nobodies (1976), with Sandy Robertson (later a rock journalist), before forming the punk band Alternative TV with Mark Perry in 1977, and a few years later (in 1981) was a founder member of Psychic TV (1981). Fergusson left the latter in 1987. He started Ambership (1984–1989), with Peter McGregor while still in Psychic TV.

In 1992, he released an eponymous white label record, followed by Perverse Ballads in 1996, The Essence in 2001, and The Castle in 2006.

As a record producer, Fergusson has worked with a variety of musicians, including Orange Juice, The Go-Betweens and Gaye Bykers on Acid.

In late 2023, he released a 5 album vinyl box set: Secret Recordings 1976–1992, on the German VOD label and featuring music from various bands and other projects from his career including solo material.

"Songbook" was released in July 2025 on Glass Modern records.

“dEMOnS” limited 10” white vinyl released February 2026.
