= Alternative TV =

British punk rock band

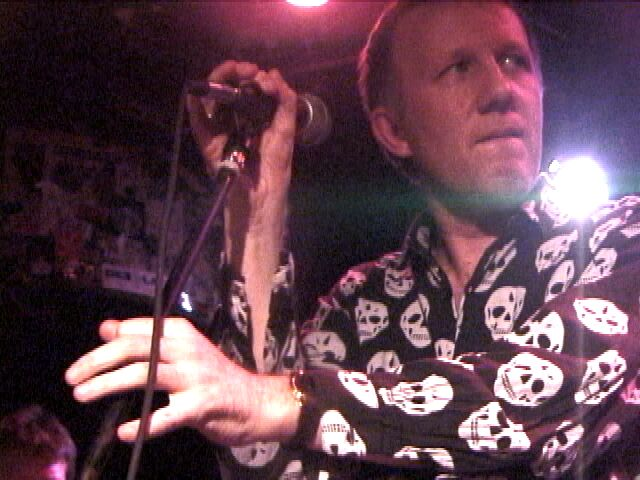
- Mark Perry in New York City, 2003

Background information
- Origin: London, England
- Genres: Punk rock; post-punk
- Years active: 1977–79; 1981; 1985–2004; 2014–present
- Labels: Deptford Fun City; I.R.S.; Noiseville; Anagram; Chapter 22; Overground; Lost Moment; Cherry Red
- Members: Mark Perry
- Past members: Alex Fergusson; Micky Smith; John Towe; Tyrone Thomas; Chris Bennett; Dennis Burns; Kim Turner; Mick Linehan; Dave George; Anno Graver; Henry Badowski; Gillian Hanna; Alan Gruner; Ray Weston; Karl Blake; Nag; Protag; Steve Cannell; Allison Phillips; Clive Giblin; Fish; James Kyllo; Dave Morgan; Bob Leith; Luci Bocchino; Rob Ugly; John Isaac; Dick Ugly; Lee McFadden; Tony Barber; Kevin Mann; Grahame Hullett; Steve Carter; Mark Tempest; Jimmy Jewell; Alan Burton
- Website: markperryatv.com

Alternative TV (sometimes known as ATV) are an English band formed in London in 1977. Author Steve Taylor writes: "Along with bands like the Ruts and of course, the Clash, Alternative TV pioneered reggae rhythms in punk and then moved on to redefine the musical rules".

== History ==
Alternative TV were formed by Mark Perry, the founding editor of Sniffin' Glue, a punk fanzine, with Alex Fergusson. The name is a play on the name of Associated Television, a British broadcaster also known as ATV. Early rehearsals took place at Throbbing Gristle's Industrial Records studio with Genesis P-Orridge on drums (recordings from this period appeared, long afterwards, on the Industrial Sessions CD). The band's first live appearance was in Nottingham supporting The Adverts.

The band's debut on record was "Love Lies Limp", a free flexi disc issued with the final edition of Perry's Sniffin' Glue fanzine. For their first two singles Perry and Fergusson were accompanied by drummer John Towe (ex-Generation X) and Tyrone Thomas on bass; Towe later left to join The Rage and was replaced by Chris Bennett. This line-up was the most straightforwardly 'punk' version of ATV, although they combined short, fast songs with extended pieces such as "Alternatives to NATO", in which Perry read an anarchist political text and envisaged the possibility of a Soviet invasion of Britain. Shortly afterwards they released the "How Much Longer"/"You Bastard" 7" in December 1977. The A-side was a pointed critique of punk style: "How much longer will people wear/Nazi armbands and dye their hair?"

At the end of 1977, Perry sacked his chief collaborator and co-writer Fergusson. The latter went on to form the short-lived Cash Pussies and, a few years later, Psychic TV along with Genesis P-Orridge. Tyrone Thomas switched to guitar, later replaced by Kim Turner, while Dennis Burns joined on bass. In 1977, Klik Records’ Joe Sinclair contributed to the early punk rock-crossover scene in London, by producing Mark Perry's roots-rock influenced single, Alternative TV’s "Life After Life"-"Life After Dub." Klik Records label described themselves as a "progressive Black Music Company, specialising in rebel-dread Reggae, modern Soul and Disco sounds." "Life After Life" was followed by the band's debut album, The Image Has Cracked, both featuring Jools Holland guesting on piano.

By the end of 1978, only Perry and Burns remained from the previous line-up, although ATV used additional musicians live and in the studio. The band's second album, Vibing Up the Senile Man (Part One), saw the band take a more explicitly experimental direction, which alienated both the music press and audiences. A recording of one gig which ended in a violent stage invasion can be heard on the cassette-only release Scars on Sunday. A live LP was released, documenting their tour with commune-dwelling progressive band Here & Now, marking the band's further movement away from the punk/new wave scene. A final single "The Force Is Blind" featured Anno from Here and Now on additional vocals.

Alternative TV soon evolved into the avant-garde project The Good Missionaries (taking the name from a track on the Vibing album), releasing one live album, Fire From Heaven, in 1979. Perry also joined the experimental duo The Door and the Window, releasing some EPs and a studio album, Detailed Twang. The following year, Perry released a solo album, Snappy Turns, before he, Burns and Fergusson briefly reformed Alternative TV along with former members of Fergusson's Cash Pussies in 1981. The reconstituted ATV released one album, Strange Kicks, a venture into light pop songs unlike any of their previous work, produced by Richard Mazda, who was the in house producer of IRS Records. The album was indifferently received. A later appraisal by AllMusic panned the album, writing that the record, along with ATV's later work, "[falls] a little flat amidst the confusion and veer[s] closer to the new wave sound than most punks would dare to venture."

From 1981 to 1982, Perry had a new project, The Reflections, a band with Nag from The Door and the Window, Karl Blake (of Lemon Kittens) and Grant Showbiz, among others. They released one album, Slugs and Toads, and a single, "4 Countries", before disintegrating.

Perry reformed ATV in 1985. This line up started with Karl Blake, Steve Cannell and Allison Philips. Martin 'Protag' Neish and then Clive Giblin featured later on guitar and ATV released further records over the following decade with varying line-ups, Perry being the only constant member. Another line-up followed with James Kyllo, Steve Cannell and Dave Morgan, which led to the release of "Sol" and "Dragon Love".

ATV's last studio album for over a decade, Revolution, was released in 2001, followed in 2003 by the official bootleg album Viva La Rock'n' Roll – consisting of live performances recorded in the UK, France, Germany and the US. In 2004, Perry recorded the Ramones song "Now I Wanna Sniff Some Glue" for a single and an Argentinian Ramones tribute album.

Their first studio album in fourteen years, Opposing Forces, was released through Lost Moment/Public Domain on 10 July 2015.

In 2022, Perry reformed Alternative TV for a series of gigs in the South West with Jimmy Jewell, Mark Tempest and Alan Burton. This line-up played their final gig in September.

== Legacy ==
Unrecorded-at-the-time ATV lyric "Urban Kids" was released as a single by Chelsea in 1977. The Chameleons regularly closed their gigs with a cover of "Splitting in 2". Savage Republic covered "Viva La Rock n' Roll" on their 1988 LP Jamahiriya Democratique et Populaire de Sauvage. Thee Headcoats recorded "Action Time Vision" for a single in 1993. Wild Billy Childish and the Musicians of the British Empire covered "Date With Doug" on their 2007 debut album.

== Members ==
Approximate dates up to 2002 adapted from Mark Perry biography.

- Mark Perry – lead vocals, guitar, other instruments (1977–present)
- Alex Fergusson – guitar, vocals (1977, 1995)
- Micky Smith – bass (1977)
- John Towe – drums (1977)
- Tyrone Thomas – bass, guitar (1977, 1995–2001)
- Chris Bennett – drums (1977–1978)
- Dennis Burns – bass, guitar (1977–1981)
- Kim Turner – guitar (1978)
- Mick Linehan – guitar (1978)
- Dave George – guitar, other instruments (1979, 1984)
- Anno Graver – vocals (1979)
- Henry Badowski – drums, sax (1979)
- Gillian Hanna – vocals (1979)
- Alan Gruner – keyboards (1981)
- Ray Weston – drums (1981)
- Karl Blake – guitar, drums (1984–1985)
- Nag – bass (1984)
- Protag – guitar (1984, 1986)
- Steve Cannell – bass (1985–1988, 1990)
- Allison Phillips – drums (1985–1987)
- Clive Giblin – guitar (1987–1988, 1995–1996)
- Fish – drums (1988)
- James Kyllo – guitar, vocals (1989–1990)
- Dave Morgan – drums (1990)
- Bob Leith – drums (1995–1996)
- Luci Bocchino – guitar (1998, 2002)
- Rob Ugly – bass (1998)
- John Isaac – drums (1998–2000, 2001–2002)
- Dick Ugly – keyboards (1998)
- Lee McFadden – bass (1998, 2002)
- Tony Barber – bass, guitar (2000–2001, 2001)
- Kevin Mann – drums (2001)
- Grahame Hullett – bass (2001–2002)
- Steve Carter – bass (2002)
- Cos Chapman – guitar, homemade instruments (2019)
- Ruth Tidmarsh – bass, vocals (2019)

== Discography ==
=== Studio albums ===
- The Image Has Cracked (1978)
- Vibing Up the Senile Man (Part One) (1979)
- Strange Kicks (1981)
- Peep Show (1987)
- Dragon Love (1990)
- My Life as a Child Star (1994)
- Punk Life (1998)
- Apollo (1999)
- Revolution (2001)
- Opposing Forces (2015)
- Direct Action (2023)

=== Split albums ===
- Scars on Sunday (1980) (with The Good Missionaries)
- An Ye as Well (1980) (with The Good Missionaries)

=== Extended plays ===
- Love/Sex EP (1986)
- The Sol EP (1990)
- Dark Places (2018)

=== Live albums ===
- What You See Is What You Are (1978) (with Here and Now)
- Live at the Rat Club '77 (1979)
- Live 1978 (1993)
- The Radio Sessions (1995)
- The Industrial Sessions 1977 (1996)
- 25 Years of ATV - Live at CBGB (2002) - reissued as Love Lies Limp (2002)
- Viva la Rock 'n' Roll (2004)
- Black and White: Live (2009)

=== Compilation albums ===
- Action Time Vision (1980)
- Splitting in 2 – Selected Viewing (1989)
- The Image Has Cracked – The Alternative TV Collection (1994)
- Vibing Up the Senile Man – The Second Alternative TV Collection (1996)
- Action Time Vision - the Very Best of Mark Perry and ATV (1977-1999) (1999)
- Action Time Vision - The ATV Anthology (2003)
- In Control (2006)
- Viva La Rock 'n' Roll (2015), Cherry Red - 4-CD box set containing the complete recordings originally on Deptford Fun City; contains the albums The Image Has Cracked, Vibing Up the Senile Man, Fire from Heaven and Snappy Tunes with bonus tracks, singles, EP tracks and the ATV part of the split album What You See Is What You Are

=== Singles ===
- "Love Lies Limp" (1977)
- "How Much Longer" (1977)
- "Life After Life" (1977)
- "Action Time Vision" (1978)
- "Life"/"Love Lies Limp" (1978)
- "The Force Is Blind" (1979)
- "The Ancient Rebels" (1981)
- "Communicate" (1981)
- "Welcome to the End of Fun" (1986)
- "My Baby's Laughing (Empty Summer Dream)" (1987)
- "Best Wishes" (1994)
- "Purpose in My Life" (1993)
- "Unlikely Star" (1999)
- "Now I Wanna Sniff Some Glue" (2004)
- "This Little Girl"/"Art School Project" (2016)
- "Negative, Primitive" (2017)
- "Walls"/"Hollow Stream" (2019)
