= Savage Republic =

American post-punk band

- Also known as: Africa Corps (1980–1982); Democratique et Populaire de Sauvage
- Origin: Los Angeles, California, United States
- Genres: Post-punk, art punk, industrial
- Years active: 1980–1983, 1984–1989, 2002–present
- Labels: Independent Project Records, Sordide Sentimental, Fundamental, PIAS Recordings, Nate Starkman & Son, Mobilization Records, Staalplaat, A Silent Place, LTM Recordings
- Spinoffs: Final Republic, Wonder, 17 Pygmies, Scenic
- Spinoff of: Bridge, Project 197, Them Rhythm Ants
- Members: Thom Fuhrmann; Ethan Port; Alan Waddington; Kerry Dowling
- Past members: Bruce Licher; Mark Erskine; Jackson Del Rey; Jeff Long; Robert Loveless; Greg Grunke; Brad Laner; Joel Connell; Sterling Fox; Val Haller; Jack Housen

Savage Republic (originally named Africa Corps) is an American, Los Angeles–based post-punk band, formed in the early 1980s and known for lengthy songs with an emphasis on percussion and droning guitars.

The group reformed in 2002 and remains active with a different lineup.

== History ==
The band was originally named Africa Corps, and was formed by UCLA students Bruce Licher (guitar) and Mark Erskine (drums/percussion). They were joined by Philip Drucker (aka Jackson Del Rey), Robert Loveless, and Jeff Long. Shortly before the release of debut album Tragic Figures in 1982 (on Licher's own Independent Project label) they changed their name to Savage Republic. Licher was also responsible for the group's sleeve designs, which were hand-letterpressed and numbered by him.

In early 1983, they issued a single, "Film Noir", backed with a version of "O Andonis" by Greek composer Mikis Theodorakis (from the Costa-Gavras film Z), which garnered international attention.

The group split up towards the end of 1983 with a second album partially completed; Loveless and Drucker completed it and it was released as an album (Jedda by the Sea) by their side project 17 Pygmies. Tragic Figures was issued in Europe in 1984 on the Sordide Sentimental label. A 7-inch EP of material recorded in 1981, Tragic Figure, was also issued that year.

In April of 1983, the band took part in the Mojave Exodus gig. In advance of the show, audiences gathered in a vacant parking lot in downtown Los Angeles, boarding a bus for a three hour drive to the gig's secret location: a dry lakebed in the Mojave desert.

The band returned in 1985 with the album Ceremonial, followed in 1986 with the Trudge EP. A live double album was released in 1987. Brad Laner joined prior to the 1988 album Jamahiriya Democratique et Populaire de Sauvage, and a further studio album (Customs) was released prior to the band splitting up in 1990.

Licher continued to run his label, and received a Grammy nomination for the artwork for For Against's debut album. He formed Scenic in the mid-1990s, a group that also featured Loveless and former Shiva Burlesque member James Brenner. Laner went on to form Medicine.

Savage Republic reformed in 2002 with original member Licher and members from the mid-1980s including Greg Grunke, Thom Fuhrmann and Ethan Port, although Licher left after a first tour. The remaining members recorded the album 1938, released by Neurot Recordings in 2007.

== Musical style ==
The band's music has been called industrial, with AllMusic's Richie Unterberger describing it as music that "grafted tribal percussion, industrial drones, and raga-like guitar lines together". Unusual percussion was a large part of their sound, incorporating oil cans and metal pipes. Trouser Press described the debut album as "a combination of industrial drone with deep machine-like swaths of dragging bass, Halloween horror-movie screams and some of the most delightfully tribal and tropical percussion found on disc". When the band reformed in 1985 they incorporated more Arabic influences. Later work also incorporated Greek influences. The band's music was described in Music USA: The Rough Guide as "hypnotic post-modern raga-rock instrumentals" and "clattering noise-rock jams".

== Members ==
=== Current members ===
- Thom Fuhrmann – bass, guitars, vocals, trombone, keyboards (1984–1989, 2002–present)
- Ethan Port – percussion, guitar, 12-string guitar, percussion, maracas, metal horn, vocals (1984–1988, 2002–present)
- Alan Waddington – drums, backing vocals (2006–present)
- Kerry Dowling – bass, guitar, keyboards, vocals (2008–present)

=== Former members ===
- Bruce Licher – guitar, 12-string guitar, bass, percussion, vocals (1980–1983, 1984–1990, 2002)
- Mark Erskine – drums, percussion, vocals (1980–1983, 1984–1987)
- Jackson Del Rey (Philip Drucker) – guitar, vocals, percussion, keyboards, saz (1980–1983, 1987–1989) (died July 16, 2022)
- Jeff Long – bass, vocals, guitar (1981–1983)
- Robert Loveless – keyboards, guitar, bass, mandolin, percussion (1982–1983, 1985–1986, 2002)
- Greg Grunke – bass, guitar, vocals, dulcimer, recorder, cümbüs (1984–1990, 2002–2008)
- Brad Laner – drums, percussion, vocals, keyboards, tapes (1987–1989)
- Joel Connell – drums (2002)
- Sterling Fox – drums (2005–2006)
- Val Haller (Adrian Osborne) – bass, melodica (2007)
- Jack Housen – bass (2007–2008)

=== Touring/live members ===
- Kendra Smith – percussion, bass guitar (1981)

=== Guest musicians ===
- Louise Bialik – vocals (1985) (on Ceremonial (1985), track "Andelusia")
- Nicola Pitchford – vocals (1988) (on Jamahiriya (1988), track "Jamahiriya")
- Bryan Taylor – drums (2007, 2022) (on Siam EP (2007), track "Heads Will Roll"; 1938 (2007), track "Song For Rikki", For Free Ukraine! (2022), track "Stingray (Tonight Show Version)")
- Julia Zuker – violin (2007) (on 1938 (2007), tracks "Caravan", "White Ginger", "Peking")
- Tara Tavi – yang qin (2007) (on 1938 (2007), track "Peking")
- John Crawford – shakers, (2007) (on 1938 (2007), track "Torpedo"), doumbek (2013) (on Aegean (2014), track "Omonoia")
- Stella Papandreopoulo – vocals (2011) (Aegean (2014), track "Aegean")
- Blaine Reininger – violin (2013) (Aegean (2014), tracks "The Arab Spring" and "Salanika")
- Emad Gabra – oud (2013) (Aegean (2014), tracks "The Arab Spring" and "Barbizon Exposure")
- Hayden Ortiz – trumpet (2013) (Aegean (2014), tracks "Victory" and "Pio Pico")
- Adrian Carrillio – trombone (2013) (Aegean (2014), tracks "Victory" and "Pio Pico")
- Robert Verdugo – trombone (2018, 2022) (on God & Guns / Tranquilo (2018)/Meteora (2021), track "God & Guns"; For Free Ukraine! (2022), track "Stingray (Tonight Show Version)")
- Carlos Jimenez – trumpet (2018, 2022) (on God & Guns / Tranquilo (2018)/Meteora (2021), track "God & Guns"; For Free Ukraine! (2022), track "Stingray (Tonight Show Version)")
- Laura Mace – vocals (2022) (on For Free Ukraine! (2022), track "Meteora (For Ukraine Version)")
- Gino Munoz – trumpet (2022) (on For Free Ukraine! (2022), track "Stingray (Tonight Show Version)")

== Discography ==
=== Studio albums ===
Date	Title	Label
1982	Tragic Figures	Independent Project Records/Sordide Sentimental
1985	Ceremonial	Fundamental
1988	Jamahiriya Democratique et Populaire de Sauvage	Fundamental
1989	Customs	Fundamental
2007	1938	Neurot Recordings
2012	Varvakios	LTM Recordings
2014	Aegean	Mobilization Records
2021	Meteora	Mobilization Records

=== Singles and EPs ===
Date	Title	Label
1983	"Film Noir" (7-inch single)	Independent Project Records
1984	Tragic Figure (7-inch EP)	Independent Project Records
1986	Trudge (12-inch EP)	PIAS Recordings
1988	"Viva La Rock 'N' Roll" (7-inch EP)	Independent Project Records
2007	Siam (CD EP)	Mobilization Records
2009	Sword Fighter - Taranto !!! (7-inch single)	A Silent Place
2018	God & Guns / Tranquilo (7-inch single)	Mobilization Records
2020	1938 / Siam (10-inch single)	Mobilization Records
2022	For Free Ukraine! (7-inch single)	Don't Sit On My Vinyl! / Mobilization Records

=== Live albums ===
Date	Title	Label
1987	Live Trek 1985 - 1986	Nate Starkman & Son/Fundamental
1987	Live at the Melkweg 25.9.87 (cassette only)	Staalplaat
1988	Lectisternium June 27, 1988 (cassette only)	Savage Republic Tapes
1990	ΝΗΠΙΑΓΩΓΕΙΟΝ: Live in Europe 1988	Fundamental
1994	Recordings From Live Performance, 1981 - 1983	Independent Project Records
2022	Africa Corps Live at the Whiskey a Go Go 30th December 1981	Independent Project Records

=== Compilation albums ===
Date	Title	Label
2002	Complete Studio Box Set	Mobilization Records
2010	Procession: An Aural History 1981-2010	LTM Recordings

=== Home videos ===
Date	Title	Label
1988	Disarmament	Atavistic
