= Mark Perry (musician) =

British writer & musician

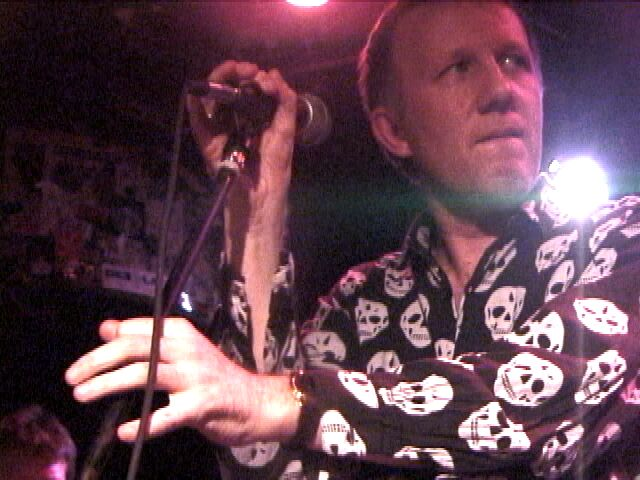
Perry in 2003

Mark Perry is a British writer and musician, and former fanzine publisher.

Perry was a bank clerk when, inspired by The Ramones, he founded the punk fanzine Sniffin' Glue (And Other Rock 'n' Roll Habits) in 1976. The publication ceased in August 1977 when he founded the band Alternative TV.

== Alternative TV ==
Alternative TV released their first single "Love Lies Limp" as a flexi disc given away free with Sniffin' Glue 12 in 1977. They then released the following singles on Deptford Fun City records: "How Much Longer / You Bastard (1977)", "Life After Life / Life After Dub (1978)" and "Action Time Vision / Another Coke (1978)".

Alex Fergusson left the band due to "musical differences" prior to the band releasing their first album, The Image Has Cracked (1978).

There were two further singles:- "The Force Is Blind" / "Lost in Room" (1979) and "Love Lies Limp" / "Life" (1979) - a posthumous release. They released a further LP:- Vibing Up the Senile Man (1979). Reformed versions of the group (with Perry as the only constant) have released numerous singles, EPs and albums since the early 1990s.

== Solo ==
In 1980, he released a solo LP, Snappy Turns, on the Deptford Fun City label, preceded by the "Whole World's Down on Me" 7", a cover of a Ken Boothe track. Another 7", "You Cry Your Tears", a collaboration with Dennis Burns, was released on the NB label in 1980.

Perry went on to perform with The Good Missionaries, The Reflections, and The Door and the Window. In the 1990s, he was involved with Baby Ice Dog. Alternative TV have played occasional gigs in recent years, both in the United Kingdom and the United States.
