= Various – Fabriksampler V2 =

Fabriksampler V2

Compilation album by Various artists
- Released: 2008
- Genre: Ambient, Experimental
- Label: Pharmafabrik

Fabriksampler V2 is a 2008 compilation album by acclaimed international musicians released on Pharmafabrik label, part of its Fabriksampler series. The album features 11 exclusive tracks made specially for this compilation, from Henrik Nordvargr Björkk (Sweden), Lull (UK), Wo0 (Serbia), Go Tsushima (Japan), Left Eye Dominant (Italy), Alexei Borisov (Russia), Tania Stene (Norway), PureH (Slovenia), Sunao Inami (Japan), Dodecahedragraph (Slovenia), The Cherry Blues Project (Argentina) and Final (UK). The compilation was issued as an audio CD and video DVD box.

== Track listing ==
1. Final: "4am Internal"
2. PureH: "Kogel"
3. Wo0: "Life Bloom"
4. Go Tsushima: "Mu"
5. Left Eye Dominant: "Grande Hysterie"
6. Alexei Borisov & Tania Stene: "Disclose"
7. Henrik Nordvargr Björkk: "Thyras Ande Och Arv"
8. The Cherry Blues Project: "Stars"
9. Dodecahedragraph: "Atan3fftrack"
10. Sunao Inami: "The End Of Spiral"
11. Lull: "The Gulley"
