= Incubate (festival) =

Annual multidisciplinary arts festival

- Genre: Rock, alternative rock, indie rock, dance, world music, punk rock, electronic music, reggae, folk music, metal, visual arts, film
- Dates: Medio September
- Locations: Tilburg, Netherlands
- Years active: 2005 – 2009 (as ZXZW) 2009 – 2016 (as Incubate)
- Website: http://www.incubate.org

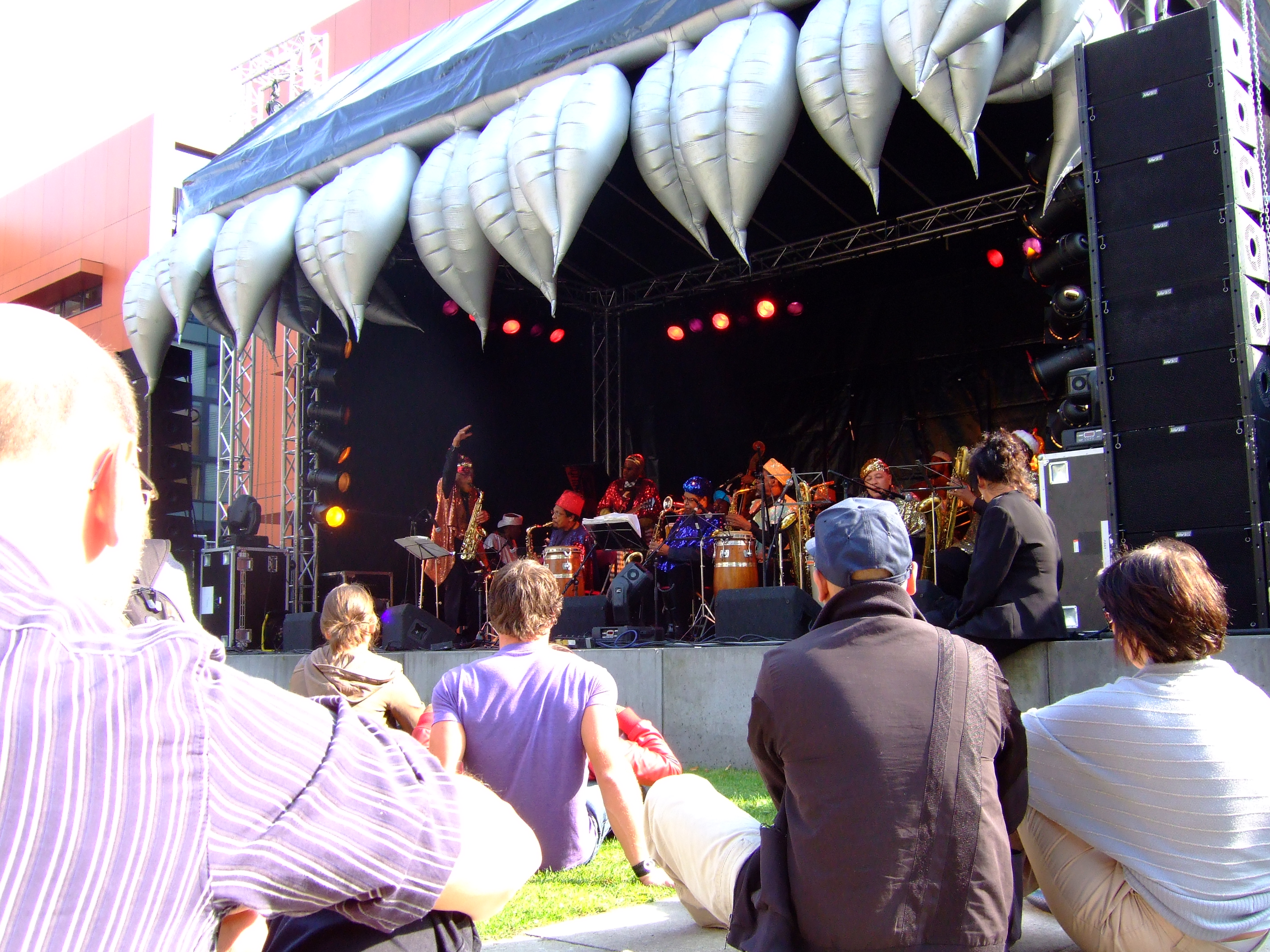

Incubate was an annual multidisciplinary arts festival held every September in Tilburg, Netherlands from 2005 to 2016. It was originally named ZXZW, but changed its name in 2009 to "Incubate" after a request from the Austin, US-based festival SXSW.

The festival exhibited indie culture events including music, contemporary dance, film and visual arts. It hosted more than 200 artists to an international audience, with performances of black metal, free jazz, street art and academic dance taking place alongside one another.

The organisation also hosted regular showcases of bands under the name Incubated.

== History ==
In 2005 ZXZW started as a two-day underground punk, hardcore and electronic music festival with 47 artists. Within three years it developed into a festival held over eight days with over 200 artists. The festival broadened its program by adopting a wide range of musical styles (from jazz to free folk and dance), along with film, lectures and visual arts. It was held in small clubs, pubs and galleries around Tilburg. In 2008 the people of Tilburg voted for ZXZW as the best event in their town.

Incubate had an independent culture blog, a blog on non-Western dance music, hosts several art-nights throughout the year and released the Social Festival Model, a platform where attendees could read and alter the business, marketing and policy plans.

By 2015 the festival had financial problems, and a grant was provided by the Province of North Brabant and the Municipality of Tilburg. Three editions of Incubate were held in 2016, but in February 2017 the festival's organizing foundation announced that the grants from Tilburg and North Brabant were withdrawn, and no festival was held in 2017.

== Editions and performances (selection) ==
Incubate was a two-day music event with a pre-party in 2005, and by 2009 became a multidisciplinary art festival lasting more than a week.

=== ZXZW 2005 ===
The first edition of the ZXZW festival, between September 24 and September 25, featured 48 acts on 7 locations. It was started by Ries Doms, Vincent Koreman, Alex van Wijk and Frank Kimenai.

Performing artists in 2005 (Selection)
- Pole
- Leng Tch'e
- Rise and Fall
- Sickboy
- Sauron
- Harmful
- Aphasic
- Stockholm Syndrome
- Galatasaray
- Danny Vera
- Spider Rico
- The Light Brigade
- Karl Heinz
- Dead Stop

=== ZXZW 2006 ===
The second festival was between September 23 and September 24 and featured 94 acts on 11 locations.

Performing artists in 2006 (Selection)
- Good Good
- Volt
- Radio Birdman
- Torche
- Baroness
- Bluebird
- VVM
- Kunt
- Shitmat
- Rise and Fall
- Machinefabriek
- Prostitute Disfigurement
- Tephra
- Bertin
- Messer Chups

=== ZXZW 2007 ===
The third ZXZW festival took place on September 16 and September 23. The number of bands that played in the music program at the festival increased to 151. There were also other art forms displayed this time: Visual arts, Dance and cinema were added to the line-up. ZXZW 2007 took place at 27 locations, one of those was a squat where young musicians played compositions by young composers. This concept was called ‘Kraaklink’ and has been continued as series the next years.

Performing artists in 2007 (Selection)

Music

- The Haters
- The Locust
- Psychic TV
- Crippled Black Phoenix
- Pantha Du Prince
- Knut
- Ceephax Acid Crew
- A Challenge of Honour
- Cutting Pink with Knives
- Negativland
- Atlantis
- Meneguar
- Infinity
- Psychic Ills
- Long Distance Calling
- Kap Bambino
- Rhys Chatham
- Ostinato
- Niobe
- Blowfly
- Grey Daturas
- Hacride

Arts

- Concert posters
- Scherven
- Streetchalk Drawing Day
- Punk Fanzine Exposition
- Tilburg Plakstad

Dance

- Vloeistof

Movies

- Short films
- La Region Centrale - Michael Snow (1971)
- Cinema Auricular: Cinema of the Ear program.

=== ZXZW 2008 ===
The fourth edition of ZXZW was hosted between September 14 and September 21, 2008. Most notable were the performances of the Sun Ra Arkestra. They performed six times in seven days at the festival, emphasizing different aspects of the musical legacy of Sun Ra every day. New this year was the special program ‘Norwegian Invasion’ in which several Norwegian artists took a central place. Also there was a multidisciplinary program (‘Svart Kunststykke’) aimed at the black metal genre in both music (Watain, Glorior Belli) and the visual arts (Erik Smith, Peter Beste). The Shape of Breakcore 2 Cum was a program for electronic dance music and also the Eurovision Noise Contest was held.

Performing artists in 2008 (Selection)

Music

- Wire
- Pelican
- Casiotone for the Painfully Alone
- Sun Ra Arkestra
- Castanets
- Blacklisted
- Paint It Black
- Torche
- Skinless
- Watain
- Cadence Weapon
- gay against you
- Doormouse
- Otto Von Schirach
- Goto80
- Ponytail
- Ladyhawk
- Trash Talk
- Guapo
- Ebola
- Pulling Teeth
- Toy
- Jeremy Jay
- Tom Brosseau
- David Karsten Daniels
- Capsula
- Steadycam
- Kid Carpet
- Blurt
- Usurper
- Taint
- Ladyscraper
- Chris Moss Acid
- Bjørn Torske
- Phill Niblock
- Tram
- Dirge

Arts

- Concert posters: Z-Stock, Svart Kunststykke (Black Arts) – Erik Smith, Peter Beste and others

Dance

- Vloeistof
- Ivo Dimchev
- Sonia Si Ahmed
- Eva Meyer Keller
- Magdalena Chowaniec

Movies

- Space Is the Place
- The Magic Sun
- Films made by Barbara Meter, Henri Plaat, Frans Zwartjes and Paul de Mol

Lecture

- Yuri Landman

=== Incubate 2009 ===
The first edition of the festival with the new name Incubate was from September 13 until September 20, 2009. The acts were confirmed daily on the Incubate website.

Performing artists in 2009 (Selection)

Music

- The Damned
- Dananananaykroyd
- Caspian
- Anaal Nathrakh
- The Number Twelve Looks Like You
- Misery Signals
- Tujiko Noriko
- Antipop Consortium
- Shackleton
- Kayo Dot
- Der Blutharsch
- Of the Wand and the Moon
- Deutsch Nepal
- Soap&Skin
- Joker
- James Blackshaw
- Bonaparte
- Au
- Jandek
- Jessica Bailiff
- Your Demise
- Cameron Deas
- Wardruna
- Uri Caine
- Troum
- On
- Pompeii
- The Caretaker

Arts

- Hermann Nitsch

Dance

- Jean-Louis Costes
- Franko B
- Kamal Ackarie
- Micheline Torres
- Doris Stelzer
- Pavlos Kountouriotis
- Jenny Beyer
- Nuno Lucas

Movies

- Anvil! The Story of Anvil
- Aktionisten compilatie
- Good Copy, Bad Copy

Lecture

- Andrew Keen

=== Incubate 2010 ===
The sixth edition of Incubate festival took place from September 12 until September 19, 2010. The theme for this edition was Piracy. Around this theme several events were held, such as The Kiosk of Piracy, Pirate Cinema and the Pirate Conference.

Performing artists in 2010 (Selection)

Music

- Black Mountain
- The Ex
- The Hunger
- This Will Destroy You
- Circle
- Windmill
- Dan Deacon
- Six Organs of Admittance
- DJ /Rupture
- Liturgy
- Zola Jesus
- Neon Indian
- Expulsion
- Lucky Dragons
- Jim Black
- Frog Pocket
- The Dreams
- Accadians
- Santa Cruz
- Accelerators
- Antillectual
- Bandish Projekt
- Battle for Paris
- Gunslingers
- Maths
- Skeletonwitch
- Switchblade
- Warbringer
- Barn Burner
- Invasion
- Moon Unit

Arts

- Ryan Trecartin
- New Jacks 2.0

Film

- Turkish Star Trek
- Da Vinci Treasure
- Snakes on a Train
- Paranormal Entity

Lectures

- Charles Leadbeater
- Matt Mason

=== Incubate 2011 ===
The 2011 edition of Incubate festival took place from September 12 until September 18, 2011.

Performing artists in 2011 (Selection)

Music

- HEALTH
- Omar Souleyman
- YOB
- Baby Dee
- Lightning Dust
- Sam Amidon
- Handsome Furs
- Picastro
- Dark Castle
- Capillary Action
- Antilles
- Austra
- Wooden Shjips
- Nadja
- Screaming Females
- Peter Broderick
- Defeated Sanity
- Gorgasm
- Lustmord
- Fostercare
- SJ Esau
- Joan of Arc
- Rivulets
- My Disco
- The Kids
- Yukon Blonde
- Aura Noir
- The Queers
- Wormrot
- Le Syndicat
- Heretic
- Monachus
- Kerouac
- Matthew Shipp
- Sleep Party People
- Mose Giganticus
- Zoviet France
- Trial
- Charles Gayle
- Rainbow Arabia
- Anchor
- Man Man
- Brasstronaut
- Wise Blood

Arts

- Nick Helderman
- Joost Jansen
- Dimitar Solakov

Dance

- It's Definitely The Spiritual Thing

Movies

- Hydra Decapita, We Don't Care About Music Anyway, NOVA - the film, Jefre Cantu-Ledesma & Paul Clipson, The Ill Mannered Milkman, Invertebrate, Goodbye Mr Christie

Lecture

- Bill Drummond

=== Incubate 2012 ===
The eighth edition of Incubate took place from Monday, September 10 to Sunday September 16. The festival attracted more than 15,000 visitors from all over the world.

Performing artists in 2012 (Selection)
- Mogwai
- Fields of the Nephilim
- The Buzzcocks
- Yann Tiersen
- Expo '70
- Laibach
- Nurse With Wound
- Japandroids
- Damo Suzuki
- British Sea Power
- Paws
- Nathan Fake
- Sleepy Sun
- Mgła
- Iceage
- Moodymann
- Chris & Cosey
- King Midas Sound
- Napalm Death
- The Men
- Angel Olsen
- A Winged Victory For The Sullen
- Kid Ink
- Black Dice
- Starve
- Reigning Sound
- Pete Namlook
- Howlin' Rain
- Andy Stott
- Nils Frahm
- Matt Elliott
- Ital
- The Telescopes
- Bill Orcutt
- Xander Harris
- Cheek Mountain Thief
- Sex Worker

Arts

- Santiago Sierra
- JR
- Leah Capaldi
- Open Source Expo
- Hans Stevens

Theatre (Zeebelt in Residence)

- If...Then
- You Are Here
- Laughing While Drinking Sour Milk

Movies

- Kid-Thing
- Grandma Lo-Fi
- Bellflower (band)|Bellflower
- Dragonslayer
- Attack Of The Giant Brain Sucker Monster From Outer Space

Lectures

- Simon Reynolds
- Robert Levine
- Roy Wilkinson

=== Incubate 2013 ===
The ninth edition of Incubate took place from Sunday, September 15 to Sunday, September 22. The festival attracted more than 17,000 visitors from all over the world. More than 300 artists performed in or in the area around Tilburg.

Performing artists in 2013 (Selection)
- Immortal
- CocoRosie
- Lambchop
- I Am Kloot
- Built to Spill
- Múm
- Gang of Four
- Front 242
- A Place to Bury Strangers
- Mayhem
- Biosphere
- 808 State
- Clock DVA
- Smith Westerns
- A Guy Called Gerald
- And So I Watch You From Afar
- Kurtis Blow
- The Field
- Tim Hecker
- Wolf Eyes
- Willis Earl Beal
- Doom (band)
- Barn Owl
- Emika
- The Twilight Sad
- Ikonika
- Yuck
- Khold
- Jesu
- Shonen Knife
- Dead Meadow
- Prurient
- Pete Swanson
- Maybeshewill
- Sean Nicholas Savage
- Jozef van Wissem
- Anna von Hausswolff
- Sonic Boom
- Black Pus
- East India Youth

Arts

- Rafaël Roozendaal
- Santiago Sierra
- Marco Martens
- Carl Schilde
- Pom Wolff

Theatre

- Electro Cha3bi Wedding Party

Movies

- Lowave

Lectures

- Acid Flashback: Before the Big Bang
- The Artist as Hybrid Monster
- Have Baby Boomers Stolen Music?
- Earning Money By Giving Away

=== Incubate 2014 ===
The tenth edition of Incubate took place from Monday, September 15 to Sunday, September 21. 290 artists performed in Tilburg. The festival attracted more than 17,000 visitors from all over the world.

Performing artists in 2014 (Selection)
- 65daysofstatic
- God is an Astronaut
- Wovenhand
- The Ocean
- This Will Destroy You
- Long Distance Calling
- Legowelt
- Goat
- The Wytches
- Kiss the Anus of a Black Cat ft Attila Shaaran
- Thee Silver Mt. Zion Memorial Orchestra
- The Neon Judgement
- Kadavar
- Nadja
- "Dizzy" Daniel Moorehead
- Tuxedomoon
- Bombino
- Otis
- Chad VanGaalen
- Lookapony
- Orgue Electronique

=== Incubate 2015 ===
The eleventh edition of Incubate was held from Monday, September 14 to Sunday, September 20 in Tilburg.

== Venues ==
Incubate took place in the inner city of Tilburg at the following venues:

Bibliotheek Tilburg Centrum, BKKC, Boerderij 't Schop, Café De Plaats, Cul de Sac, De Beukentuin, De NWE Vorst, Dolfijn Bowling, Duvelhok, Extase, Factorium, Filmfoyer, Galerie Kokon, Hall of Fame, Kafee 't Buitenbeentje, Koepelhal, Koningsplein, Kraakpand / Squat, Kunstpodium T, Little Devil, Mayor's Room, Muzentuin, NS16, Open Air Stage, Paradox, Pauluskerk, Pieter Vreedeplein, Project Space Tilburg - Gust van Dijk, 013, Sounds, Studio, Synagoge, Theaters Tilburg, V39, Virginarty, Weemoed, Willemsplein, Zaal 16.
