= Pharmafabrik =

- Founded: 1993
- Genre: Ambient; Noise; Experimental; Electro-acoustic
- Country of origin: Slovenia
- Official website: http://www.pharmafabrik.com/

Pharmafabrik is an independent record label based in Slovenia and founded in 1993, most noted for their comprehensive and critically acclaimed Fabriksampler compilation albums with artists Final, Lull, KK Null, Alexei Borisov, Nordvargr, Surgeon, Eraldo Bernocchi, Franck Vigroux, Mike Browning, PureH, Chris Wood, Psychedelic Desert, Pharmakustik, P.C.M., Daniel Buess, The Cherry Blues Project and others.

== Compilation albums ==
- Various – FabrikSampler 1 (2006)
- Various – Fabriksampler V2 (2008)
- Various – Fabriksampler V4 (2011)

== See also ==
- List of record labels
- List of electronic music record labels
