= SleepResearch Facility =

SleepResearch_Facility
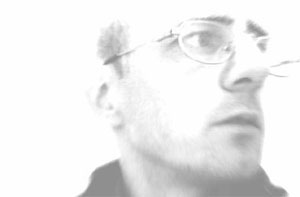
- Kevin Doherty of SleepResearch_Facility

Background information
- Birth name: Kevin Doherty
- Origin: Glasgow, Scotland
- Genres: Ambient, dark ambient
- Years active: 2000 to present
- Labels: Cold Spring, Manifold
- Website: http://www.resonance-net.com/

SleepResearch_Facility (sometimes abbreviated to SR_F or SRF) is a dark ambient artist from Glasgow, Scotland, specializing in sleep-conducive beatless ambient music which is both artistic as well as functional.

== Overview ==
SleepResearch_Facility consists of the single band member Kevin Doherty. His music usually contains no rhythmic elements (one exception is "2.5" on Dead Weather Machine), but instead relies on spacious, extended, richly-textured sounds. Occasionally, true 'musical' elements appear in his work, such as sustained chords (in "c-deck" on Nostromo for example), but the majority of his compositions consist of evolving layers of manipulated noise and mechanical drones. He deliberately attempts to avoid any sonic elements which would be likely to disturb a sleepy or sleeping listener, such as sudden loud noises.

The music of SR_F is also intended to create an aural environment which allows listeners to let their thoughts drift, being gently guided (instead of forced) by the music. The following advice is provided for listeners: "recommended playback level: just above quiet". A more detailed overview of SR_F can be found online.

The works of SR_F are inspired by power stations, distant motorways, certain sci-fi movies (e.g. Alien) and various aspects of nature, including thunderstorms, empty frozen tundra, deserts, jungles and rushing water. Two complete albums (Dead Weather Machine and Dead Weather Machine Re:Heat) were based entirely on the manipulation of a three-minute recording of a malfunctioning Dimplex electric fan heater.

So far, all albums by SR_F have been produced or engineered at Somnambu-Lab (also spelled Somnambulab) in Glasgow. The correct spelling of the artist's name is SleepResearch_Facility, but Sleep Research Facility is a commonly seen variation.

In April 2012, a new album called Stealth was released on Cold Spring.

== Discography and merchandise ==
Albums

- Nostromo, Cold Spring, 2001 (original release) and 2007 (reissue)
- Dead Weather Machine, Manifold Records, 2004
- Dead Weather Machine Re:Heat, Manifold Records, 2004
- Deep Frieze, Cold Spring, 12 April 2007
- Stealth, Cold Spring, 9 April 2012
- Split with Llyn y Cwn, Cold Spring, 21 April 2022

Appearance on compilations

- "Deck A – Deck B" on Chamber, Cold Spring, 2003
- "82°S 45°E" on Swarm, Cold Spring, 2006
- "Dark Side Of The Lune" on Au Clair De La Lune, INFREQUENCY, 2009
- "AB-Mix" on Rope to the Sky (Anniversary Collection), Ambientblog.net, 2015
- "theta2delta" on From Here to Tranquility Volume 9 - In Dreams, Silent Records, 2018
- "Unrest" on From Here to Tranquility Volume 12 (Horizonte Aeternitatis), Silent Records, 2020
- "Sargo " (excerpt) on Arise - A Cold Spring Sampler, Cold Spring, 2023

Merchandise

- SR_F appeared on the February page of the Cold Spring Calendar 2007.

== Critical response and public exposure ==
The majority of feedback on SR_F's work is extremely positive. Steve Roach has written a complimentary review of SR_F's albums Dead Weather Machine and Dead Weather Machine Re:Heat on his website, and even sold the albums from his online store while stocks lasted.

SR_F's work has also been highly praised by ambient websites such as AmbiEntrance and Aural Pressure, and the artist's official guestbook contains many positive comments which have been submitted since 2004.

In 2005, some of SR_F's music was broadcast on Dutch Radio 4FM (now known as NPS Studio 6). Radio 6 program FOLIO broadcast a full SR_F radio special on 2 October 2007.

SR_F has performed live at several venues:

- 17 December 2007 – Altaira ambient night at The White Orchid (Club Z) in Toronto, Canada, alongside Shatterwave, Cauterwall, This Instrument, dreamSTATE and Slopoke (first ever live performance).
- 29 January 2008 – Ambient Ping night at The Drake Hotel in Toronto, alongside Syzygia and Ortiz.
- 19 March 2008 – Renaissance Cafe in Toronto, alongside dreamSTATE, Teratoma, Toxia, Ouroboros, This Instrument, Cauterwall, Sighup, and Beta Cloud.
- 23 April 2008 – Altaira ambient night at the Renaissance Cafe in Toronto, for Toronto Noise Promotions.
- 18 May 2008 – The Music Gallery in Toronto, with KTL (Stephen O'Malley and Peter Rehberg) and Németh.
- 6 September 2014 – The Dome in London, closing set for a Cold Spring all-day event.

The January 2008 edition of Terrorizer included a feature on SR_F in the "Breaking Faces" section.

== Interviews ==
There are three known SR_F interviews available on the Internet, which provide a behind-the-scenes look at the creation of the albums, as well as background information on SR_F in general.

=== Ortus Obscurum ===
Sometime between 2001 and 2003, SR_F was interviewed by Ectonaut at Ortus Obscurum, "a webzine devoted to writing about the various types of music referred to as Neo-Classical, Dark Ambient, Ritual, Fantasy, Neo-Pagan, Industrial, Electronic, Experimental and so on".

=== Cold Spring Supplement ===
In January 2007, SR_F was interviewed for the January/February 2007 edition of the Cold Spring Supplement, prior to the release of Deep_Frieze on the Cold Spring label.

== Hidden information on the official website ==
The official SR_F website used to contain some pages which appeared to be hidden from the general public, since there were no known links to them from anywhere else on the site. These pages have now been deleted, but some of the MP3s which they linked to are still available.

=== Audio Project Archive ===
The Audio Project Archive page contained additional information about released albums, details about upcoming albums and unreleased works, as well as free tracks in MP3 format. The Sargasso (edit) MP3 from the Electronarcosis Series is still available.

=== Assembler ===
This little-known project is related to SR_F, and produces mechanically rhythmic dance music. An overview of Assembler was available in the Audio Project Archive. Currently, no tracks have been released on CD.

Assembler had its own website, which consisted of a home page, a main page and a collection of free tracks in RealAudio format: "Two Towers", "Hack1 quick edit", "Hack3 Final mix", "Whole in 1" and "one tower". MP3s of the tracks Sentinals, Union Station, Jack-2-Jack and Kernals are still available.

== See also ==
- List of dark ambient artists
