= MetalDays =

Heavy metal music festival in Slovenia

Coordinates: 46.1769°N 13.7317°E

- Genre: Heavy metal, extreme metal
- Dates: July, August
- Locations: Tolmin, Slovenia (2004–2022); Velenje, Slovenia (2023)
- Years active: 2004–2023
- Website: metaldays.net

MetalDays was a heavy metal music festival held annually Slovenia. It saw increased popularity every year with more media coverage, and saw bands like Megadeth, Slayer, Amon Amarth, Volbeat and Sabaton and many more play at the festival. It was also known for its sustainability and ecology initiatives and won a greener future award 5 years in a row.

From 2004 till 2022, the festival was held in Sotočje, Tolmin. In 2010, the tickets were limited to 12,000, but the limit was later increased to 25,000. 2012 was the last year when the name Metalcamp was used before the name was changed to MetalDays in 2013. In 2023, the location changed to Lake Velenje, Velenje. The festival was last held in 2023 and was officially discontinued in 2024.

Since 2023 a new festival called Tolminator has been held in Tolmin. The location is the same as the one for Metaldays in Tolmin was, except for the festival area being smaller as a new road was constructed limiting the festival area size.

== Location ==
The festival was located at Sotočje, Tolmin, which lies in between the two mountain rivers called Tolminka and Soča. MetalDays had two festival-reserved beaches and a camping area.

In 2023, the location for MetalDays moved to Lake Velenje, Velenje. The festival offered a large camping area with glamping and pre-pitched tent options. The location was easily accessible by train, bus, or car.

== Lineups ==
The lineups for each year are the following:

=== 2004 ===
When: 20–21 August 2004
Lineup: Danzig, Apocalyptica, Hypocrisy, Sentenced, Primal Fear, Katatonia, Dew-Scented, Dead Soul Tribe, Fleshcrawl, Mnemic, Prospect, Belphegor, Ancient, Destruction, Brainstorm, Dark Funeral, Vintersorg, Finntroll, Green Carnation, Ektomorf, Noctiferia, Negligence, Rising Dream

=== 2005 ===
When: 24–26 June 2005
Lineup: Slayer, HammerFall, Yngwie Malmsteen, In Extremo, Noctiferia, Betzefer, Suidakra, Soulfly, Obituary, JBO, Kataklysm, Ektomorf, Morgana Lefay, Graveworm, Hatesphere, Belphegor, Anthrax, Children of Bodom, Therion, Dissection, Disbelief, Exciter, The Duskfall, Reapers, Prospect

=== 2006 ===
When: 21–23 July 2006
Lineup: Amon Amarth, Hypocrisy, Jon Oliva's Pain, Nevermore, Deathstars, Decapitated, Scaffold, Dimmu Borgir, Testament, My Dying Bride, Soilwork, Wintersun, Evergrey, Heaven Shall Burn, Excelsis, Opeth, Kreator, Edguy, Kataklysm, Gorefest, Cataract, Mystic Prophecy, Mely

=== 2007 ===
When: 16–22 July 2007
Lineup: Motörhead, Blind Guardian, Cradle of Filth, Immortal, Sepultura, Satyricon, Pain, The Exploited, Sodom, Doro, Grave Digger, Threshold, Unleashed, Converge, Dismember, Ensiferum, Die Apokalyptischen Reiter, Dew-Scented, Graveworm, The Vision Bleak, Disillusion, Born from Pain, Krypteria, Eluveitie, Aborted, Vreid, Korpiklaani, Sadist, Full Blown Chaos, Animosity, Prospect, Noctiferia, Eventide, Ars Moriendi, Sardonic, Nervecell, Herfst, Alltheniko

=== 2008 ===
When: 4–8 July 2008
Lineup: Meshuggah, Carcass, Amon Amarth, Kataklysm, Behemoth, Tankard, Brainstorm, Rage, Skyforger, Ministry, Wintersun, Iced Earth, Helloween, Mystic Prophecy, Apocalyptica, Mercenary, In Flames, Finntroll, Subway to Sally, Drone, The Sorrow, Gorilla Monsoon, Alestorm, Sahg, Hate, Morbid Angel, Onslaught, Korpiklaani, Evergrey, Opeth, Six Feet Under, October file, In Extremo, S.A. Sanctuary, Exterminator, At the Lake, ArseA, Planet Rain

=== 2009 ===
When: 2–7 July 2009
Lineup: Hatebreed, Blind Guardian, Lamb of God, Nightwish, Dimmu Borgir, Edguy, Kataklysm, Destruction, My Dying Bride, Sodom, Legion of the Damned, Graveworm, Die Apokalyptischen Reiter, Sonic Syndicate, Keep of Kalessin, Hollenthon, Hackneyed, Deathstars, Kreator, Vader, DragonForce, A New Dawn, Arsames, D-Swoon, Disease Illusion

=== 2010 ===
When: 5–10 July 2010
Lineup: Immortal, Behemoth, Cannibal Corpse, Sonata Arctica, Obituary, Sabaton, Overkill, Finntroll, Korpiklaani, Leaves' Eyes, Ensiferum, Equilibrium, The Exploited, Decapitated, Epica, Insomnium, Kalmah, The Devil's Blood, Ex Deo, Rotting Christ, Trail of Tears, Suicidal Angels, Demonical, Metsatoll, Insision, Heidevolk, Dornenreich, Omega Lithium, Enochian Theory, Abstinenz, All Seasons Remain, Ashes You Leave, D-Swoon, S.A. Sanctuary

=== 2011 ===
When: 11–17 July 2011
Lineup: Accept, Achren, Airbourne, Alestorm, Algebra, Amorphis, Arch Enemy, Ava Inferi, Avatar, Beholder, Blind Guardian, Brainstorm, Brujeria, Bulldozer, Cold Snap, Death Angel, Deicide, Die Apokalyptischen Reiter, Hate, Imperium Dekadenz, In Extremo, In Solitude, Kalmah, Obscura, October File, Rising Dream, Ritam Nereda, Serenity, Slayer, Suicidal Angels, Taake, Thaurorod, The Ocean, Trollfest, Vanderbuyst, Visions of Atlantis, Vulture Industries, Watain, Winterfylleth, Wintersun, Virgin Steele, Zonaria, Eternal Death

=== 2012 ===
When: 5–11 August 2012
Lineup:Amon Amarth, At the Gates, Ava Inferi, Avven, Before the Dawn, The Black Dahlia Murder, Brezno, Cattle Decapitation, Dark Funeral, Doomed, Dust Bolt, Edguy, From the Depth, Eluveitie, Epica, Finntroll, The Furious Horde, Gorguts, Grand Magus, Hatebreed, Hatesphere, Heathen, Heidevolk, Incantation, Inmate, Kataklysm, Korn, Korpiklaani, Krampus, Madball, Machine Head, Metalsteel, Milking the Goatmachine, Morana, Municipal Waste, Napalm Death, Nexus Inferis, Nile, Noctiferia, Nominal Abuse, Pain, Paradise Lost, Purify, Sabaton, Sanctuary, Septicflesh, Sin Deadly Sin, Sodom, Steelwing, Testament, Trollfest, Vicious Rumors, Warbringer, Wisdom, ArseA

=== 2013 ===
When: 21–28 July 2013
Lineup: 4ARM, Acid Death, Agan, Alestorm, Anaal Nathrakh, Annihilator, Arkona, ArseA, Attick Demons, Aura Noir, Avicularia, Benediction, Blaakyum, Bleed from Within, Bliksem, Bloodshot Dawn, Blynd, Brutal Truth, Calderah, Calling of Lorme, Candlemass, Chained Pistons, Chronosphere, Cold Snap, Coma, Cripper, Dark Salvation, Darkest Horizon, Dickless Tracy, Drakum, Dying Fetus, Emergency Gate, Ensiferum, Enslaved, Eternal Deformity, Exhumed, Extreme Smoke 57, Eyehategod, From the Depth, Gloryhammer, Gonoba, Graveworm, Hammercult, Herfst, Hypocrisy, Iced Earth, Ihsahn, Imperium, In Flames, Incinery, Inverted Pussyfix, Karlahan, Karnak, King Diamond, Kissin Dynamite, Last Day Here, Legion of the Damned, Leprous, Lock Up, Mayhem, Meshuggah, Meta-stasis, Metal Church, Mouth of the Architect, Mustasch, Mystery, Nemesis My Enemy, Neurotech, Nightmare, Nya, Onslaught, Orange Goblin, Otargos, Overkill, Parasol Caravan, Pentagram, Pet the Preacher, Phantasmagoria, Powerwolf, Primordial, Ravenblood, Rest in Fear, Rising Dream, Sabbath Judas Sabbath, Samael, Shining, Soilwork, Sólstafir, Sonata Arctica, Space Unicorn on Fire, SpitFire, Steel Engraved, Stormcast, Subway to Sally, Svart Crown, Taake, The Canyon Observer, The Loudest Silence, The Rotted, Torche, Tsjuder, Turisas, Under the Abyss, Unleashed, Vallorch, Vicious Rumors, Wintersun, Within Destruction

=== 2014 ===
When: 20–26 July 2014
Lineup: Abinchova, Aborted, African Corpse, Alcest, Alogia, Alpha Tiger, Amorphis, Armaroth, Artillery, As It Comes, Asphyx, Benighted, Black Diamond, Borknagar, Brutality Will Prevail, Chain of Dogs, Children of Bodom, Condemnatio Cristi, Cripper, Cruel Humanity, Darkfall, Dead Territory, Deadend in Venice, Downfall of Gaia, Drakum, Duirvir, Fallen Utopia, From the Depth, Ghost Brigade, GOLD, Grave, Havok, Heaven Shall Burn, Helslave, Immolation, In Solitude, Inciter, Inquisition, Kadavar, Lord Shades, Manilla Road, Megadeth, Mephistophelian, Metalsteel, Moonsorrow, My Dying Bride, Nocturnal Depression, Obituary, Opeth, Possessed, Prong, Pyrexia, Rest in Fear, Rising Storm, Roxin Palace, Sabaton, Saltatio Mortis, Sapiency, Satyricon, Scarab, Skelfir, Soen, Space Unicorn on Fire, Suffocation, Tiamat, Torture Pit, Total Annihilation, Turning Golem, Vader, Valient Thorr, Vanderbuyst, Volbeat, Weeping Silence, Within Destruction, Zanthropya Ex, Zaria

=== 2015 ===
When: 19–25 July 2015 (bands 20–24 July)

Lineup: Accept, Altair, Anvil, Arch Enemy, Avatar, Behemoth, Black Label Society, Blues Pills, Cannibal Corpse, Carcass, Carnifex, Crowbar, Deadlock, Death Angel, Demonic Resurrection, Devin Townsend Project, Diablo Blvd, Dr. Living Dead, Dream Theater, Eluveitie, Emil Bulls, Fear Factory, Hardcore Superstar, Hatebreed, Kataklysm, Krokodil, Manntra, Mephistophelian, Moonspell, Nuclear Chaos, Panikk, Profane Omen, Queensryche, Rest In Fear, Saxon, Sepultura, Skindred, Slomind, Suicide Silence, The Devil, Total Annihilation, Unearth, Vreid, Abandon Hope, Adam Bomb, Aeons Confer, Athropofago, Archgoat, Audrey Horne, Betraying The Martyrs, Blitzkrieg, Blutmond, Broken Mirrors, Chronic Hate, Conorach, Consecration, Daedric Tales, Dark Fortress, Desolate Fields, Dickless Tracy, DIS.AGREE, Divided Multitude, Emergency Gate, Eruption, ETECC, Ever-Frost, Flesh, Hirax, Infestus, Kampfar, Klamm, Kryn, M.A.I.M., Malevolence, Mass Hypnosis, Minotauro, Mist, Mooncry, Morana, Ne Obliviscaris, Nervosa, Noctiferia, Paragoria, Psykosis, Reek Of Insanity, Rotting Christ, Sacred Steel, Schirenc Plays Pungent Stench, SiliuS, Striker, Suborned, Sunchair, The Black Dahlia Murder, TomCat, Toxic Holocaust, War-Head, Year Of No Light, Zombie Rodeo

=== 2016 ===
When: 24–30 July 2016

Lineup: At the Gates, Blind Guardian, Testament, DevilDriver, Between the Buried and Me, Cattle Decapitation, Dark Funeral, Delain, Die Apokalyptischen Reiter, Dragonforce, Dying Fetus, Electric Wizard, Exodus, Gloryhammer, Graveyard, Immolation, Incantation, Marduk, Melechesh, Obscura, Skálmöld, Skindred, Bury Tomorrow, Gama Bomb, Gutalax, Horna, Jess Cox (Tygers of Pan Tang), Monolithe, Orphaned Land, Rise of the Northstar, Rosetta, Septicflesh, Skyforger, The Stone, Valkyrja, Cryptex, Dead Label, Dirge, Double Crush Syndrome, Drakum, Gloryful, Hackneyed, Infernal Tenebra, Larceny, Little Dead Bertha, Nameless Day Ritual, Nightmare, Obscurity, Painful, Penitenziagite, Sarcasm, The Canyon Observer, Victims of Creation, Weeping Silence, Blaze of Sorrow, Dead End, Deserted Fear, Elferya, Enthrope, Eruption, Fleshdoll, Fogalord, Halo Creation, Howling in the Fog, Jioda, Kain, Layment, Mist, Morana, Morywa, Mynded, Na Cruithne, Nemost, Nolentia, Retrace My Fragments, Sabaium, Sanity's Rage, Sarcom, Scarred, Seduced, Zix, Bloodrocuted.

=== 2017 ===
When: 23–29 July 2017

Lineup: Abbath, Absu, Amon Amarth, Angelus Apatrida, Architects, Aversions Crown, Avven, Battlesword, Batushka, Beheaded, Bloodbath, Blues Pills, Bömbers, Burn Fuse, Cancer, Carnage Calligraphy, Carrion, Chontaraz, Crisix, Dead End, Death Angel, Dool, Dordeduh, Doro, Ebony Archways, Equilibrium, Evil Invaders, Fallen Tyrant, Fir Bolg, Firespawn, Firtan, Fit For An Autopsy, For I Am King, Fractal Universe, Grand Magus, Grave Digger, Greybeards, Grime, Gust, Gutalax, Heaven Shall Burn, Hell, Hellcrawler, Iced Earth, Immorgon, Implore, In The Crossfire, Infected Chaos, Kadavar, Katana, Katatonia, Kobra And The Lotus, Krisiun, Lik, Loathe, Lost Society, Loudness, Lacabre, Marilyn Manson, MGLA, Moros, Morywa, Mynded, Myriad Lights, Na Cruithne, Nemost, Nord, Novacrow, Omophagia, Opeth, Ortega, Overtures, Pain, Pain Is, Pantaleon, Persefone, PIJN, Pikes Edge, Rapid Force, Raven, Rectal Smegma, Reverend Hound, Sanctuary, Sasquatch, Selfmachine, Seven Spires, Shining, Shotdown, Sinister, Sleepers' Guilt, Snake Eater, Sober Assault, Sólstafir, Spasm, Srd, Stortregn, Suicidal Angels, Tears Of Martyr, The Black Court, The Crawling, The Foreshadowing, The Great Discord, Transceatla, Triosphere, Turbowarrior Of Steel, Tyrmfar, Tytus, Vasectomy, Venom Inc., Vexevoid, Visions Of Atlantis, Warbringer, Whorion, Witchfynde, Zayn, Zora

=== 2018 ===
When: 21–27 July 2018

Lineup: Accept, Alestorm, And there will be blood, Asomvel, Ater era, Behemoth, Belphegor, Birdflesh, Cannibal Corpse, Caronte, Carpathian forest, Children Of Bodom, Cold snap, Coroner, Dekadent, Diamond Head, Dreamspirit, Ensiferum, Epica, Firtan, Girlschool, Goathwore, Hate, Hatebreed, Hate Eternal, Hecate enthroned, Igorrr, Jig ai, Jinjer, Judas Priest, Kataklysm, Leprous, Loudness, The Lurking Fear, Master, Metal Allegiance, Mantar, Moros, Municipal Waste, Myrkur, Nordjevel, Obituary, Orcus o dis, Pallbearer, Pillorian, Primordial, Rage, Rotten Sound, Saille, Schammasch, Shining, Sinistro, Sober assault, Sorcerer, Storm seeker, Tesseract, Vuur, Watain, Wiegedood

=== 2019 ===
When: 20–26 July 2019

Lineup: Akercocke, Alien Weaponry, Alkaloid, Altair, Animae Silentes, Arcanus, Arch Enemy, Athiria, Architects, Atrexial, Autopsy Night, Bel O Kan, Big Bad Wolf, Bloodshot Dawn, Bullet, Captain Morgan's Revenge, Circle Of Execution, Cliteater, Coexistence, Convictive, Countless Skies, Critical Mess, Dead Label, Decapitated, Decaying Days, Demons & Wizards, Desdemonia, Dimmu Borgir, Distruzione, Doctor Cyclops, Dopelord, Dornenreich, Dream Theater, Esodic, Eternal Delyria, Fallen Arise, Fearancy, Finntroll, Fleshless, Ghaal's Wyrd, Glista, God Is An Astronaut, Heart Of A Coward, Heathenspawn, Hellavista, Helstar, Hexa Mera, Hour Of Penance, Hydra, Hypocrisy, Immortal Shadow, Impaled Nazarene, In The Woods, Incursed, Infected Rain, Infinitas, Inmate, Islay, Kairos, Kalmah, Klynt, Korpiklaani, Kvelertak, Leave Scars, Leeched, Liquid Graveyard, Lucifer, Lurking, Molybaron, Moonskin, Morost, Necrophobic, Neurosis, Noctiferia, Nox Vorago, Obsolete Incarnation, October Tide, Orcus O Dis, Procreation, Pyroxene, Reject The Sickness, Richthammer, Rise Of The Northstar, Ritam Nereda, Rolo Tomassi, Rotting Christ, Saturnus, Scardust, Shade Of Hatred, Signs Of Algorithm, Siska, Skeletal Remains, Slave Pit, Soilwork, Stoned Jesus, Supreme Carnage, Svart Crown, Swarm Of Serpents, Tarja, Teleport, Ten Ton Slug, The Bearded Batards, The Privateer, The Ruins Of Beverast, The Vintage Caravan, Tiamat, Tribulation, Une Misere, Inhuman Insurrection, Voice Of Ruin, W.E.B., While She Sleeps, Winterhorde

=== 2020 ===
When: 26 July–1 August 2020

Lineup: 1914, Amon Amarth, Anthrax, As I Lay Dying, Asphyx, At the Gates, Baest, Benediction, Beyond Creation, Cattle Decapitation, Clutch, Cradle of Filth, Cro-Mags, Death Angel, Despised Icon, Devin Townsend, Hellripper, Jinjer, Malevolent Creation, Napalm Death, Official Darkest Hour, Paradise Lost, Rotting Christ, Sick of it all, Testament, Toxic Holocaust,

=== 2021 (The Weekend of Solace) ===
When: 29 July–1 August 2021

Lineup: Moonspell, Decapitated, Igorrr, SkyEye, Noctiferia, Metalsteel, Brutal Sphincter, Srd, Morost, Manntra, Inmate, Mist

=== 2022 ===
When: 24–30 July 2022

Lineup: Amenra, Angelus Apatrida, Britof, Brutal Sphincter, Cabal, Carnal Diafragma, Carnation, Celeste, Chains, Cold Snap, Convictive, Countless Skies, Cypecore, Darkfall, Darvaza, Death Angel, Deathchant, Decapitated, Deez Nuts, Doodseskader, Evoken, Fleshcrawl, Groza, Gutalax, Hangman's Chair, Hegemone, In Twilight's Embrace, Incantation, Incursed, James Rivera's Metal Asylum, Jinjer, Manntra, Mercyful Fate, Meshuggah, Metalsteel, Mist, Moonspell, Morost, Nanowar of Steel, Noctiferia, Orange Goblin, Panzerfaust, Party Cannon, Pilgrimage, Rotting Christ, Srd, Saor, Shores of Null, Sick of It All, Siderean, Signs of Algorithm, Skindred, SkyEye, Stallion, Stamina, Striker, Suffocation, Sylvaine, Testament, The Devil's Trade, The Great Old Ones, The Halo Effect, The Privateer, Truchło Strzygi, Uada, Unearth, Visions of Atlantis, Voices, Vulture Industries, Whiskey Ritual, Year of the Goat

=== 2023 ===
When: 31 July–4 August 2023 (The last day of the festival was canceled due to heavy rainfall.)

Abbath, The Agonist, Archspire, At the Gates, Beartooth, Beyond God, Biohazard, Blackout, Blód, Brand of Sacrifice, Bullet for My Valentine, Carcass, Carthagods, Chemside, Cro-Mags, Cryptosis, Dear mother, Destruction, Dethrone the Corrupted, Eleine, Element, Extreme Smoke 57, Fit for an Autopsy, Goragorja, Graphic Nature, Heaven Shall Burn, Helloween, Heian, Here Comes the Kraken, Hierophant, In Flames, In Heaven, Kadavar, Kaoz, Kataklysm, Keep of Kalessin, Kreator, Lizzard, Marduk, Mass Hysteria (band), Messa, Moshead, Napalm Death, Okl's Fuitloops, Orbit Culture, Paradise Lost, The Raven Age, Russian Circles, Sacred Reich, Secret Sphere, Siderean, Sólstafir, Souls of Diotima, Spirit Mother, Stillbirth, Terror, Thundermother, Unto Others, Urne, The Voynich Code, Wolfheart (band)
