= Nostromo (disambiguation) =

Nostromo is a 1904 novel by Joseph Conrad.

Nostromo may also refer to:

- Nostromo (album), a dark ambient album by SleepResearch Facility, inspired by the fictional starship
- Nostromo (chasma), a chasma on the moon Charon
- Nostromo (game controller), a keypad-based USB video game controller
- Nostromo (TV series), a 1997 British-Italian TV serial
- Nostromo Defensa, an Argentine defense contractor specializing in UAVs
- Nostromo, a fictional starship in the 1979 film Alien
- Nostromo, a yacht hired by Latifa bint Mohammed Al Maktoum (II) to aid in her escape from Dubai
