= Deep Frieze =

Deep_Frieze

Studio album by SleepResearch Facility
- Released: 12 April 2007
- Genre: Dark ambient
- Length: 58:29
- Label: Cold Spring
- Producer: Kevin Doherty

SleepResearch Facility chronology
Dead Weather Machine Re:Heat (2004)	Deep_Frieze (2007)

Deep_Frieze is the fourth album by dark ambient artist SleepResearch Facility.

== Overview ==
The album is described as "Ultra deep, glacial Dark Ambient, based around Antarctic co-ordinates" on the website of the record label, Cold Spring. Each of the five tracks is associated with a particular location in Antarctica.

The album's tagline is printed inside the CD booklet:

there is a certain comforting warmth in the encroaching slumber of hypothermia

The album cover shown on this page is an early draft. On the finished cover, the artist's name is printed as SleepResearchFacility instead of sleep research facility, the album name is printed as Deep_Frieze instead of DEEP FRIEZE, and the text follows the curved lines on the map.

== History ==
The concept of the album was first mentioned in the interview with Ortus Obscurum, sometime between 2001 and 2003:

Having recently watched a documentary about remote weather stations on the Antarctic continent I've been working with a lot of expansive "frosty" textures - the words "Deep Frieze" keep popping into my head as a potential working title.

In June 2003, early mixes of three of the album tracks were made available as MP3s on the Audio Project Archive page of the official website.

The album was mentioned again in the Foreshadow Magazine interview in September 2004, and at that time, the expected release date was the beginning of 2005. Kevin Doherty, the single band member of SleepResearch_Facility, described his inspiration behind the album in the Cold Spring Supplement interview in January 2007.

== Track listing ==
Track	Name	Duration
1	"79ºS 83ºW"	13:34
2	"72ºS 49ºE"	11:48
3	"82ºS 62ºE"	11:12
4	"86ºS 115ºW"	10:51
5	"80ºS 96ºE"	11:04

== Response ==
Steve Roach described the album as "Outstanding dark ambient", and the majority of reviews were positive.
