= Dead Weather Machine Re:Heat =

Dead Weather Machine_Re:Heat

Studio album by SleepResearch Facility
- Released: 2004
- Recorded: Somnambulab, Glasgow, 2004
- Genre: Dark ambient
- Length: 51:00
- Label: Manifold Records
- Producer: Kevin Doherty

SleepResearch Facility chronology
Dead Weather Machine (2004)	Dead Weather Machine_Re:Heat (2004)	Deep Frieze (2007)

Dead Weather Machine_Re:Heat (sometimes abbreviated to DWM Re:Heat) is the third album by dark ambient artist SleepResearch Facility, and is the second of a two-part set, the first part being Dead Weather Machine (also known as DWM).

== Overview ==
DWM Re:Heat is defined on its cover as "[an extended treatment of the dead weather machine recording]", since it was created from the same three-minute recording of the Tango2 heater which was used to create DWM. Manifold Records were sufficiently impressed by DWM to commission SleepResearch_Facility to produce a second album in the same style, to be released as a very limited edition (100 copies on CD-R). However, when they received the master disc of DWM Re:Heat, they were "blown away and realized this was too good to let slip into obscurity", and so 1000 CDs were manufactured instead. More information about the creation of both albums can be found in the DWM overview.

Whereas DWM consists of seven tracks, each with its own individual style, DWM Re:Heat is a single long-form piece, which gradually evolves during its 51 minutes, "unconstrained by the notion of using separate tracks to define the project". The album's overall sound is similar to that of DWM, but more minimal and free-flowing, and described by Manifold Records as "slowly changing, deep, meditative drift". As with all of SleepResearch_Facility's music, DWM Re:Heat is very sleep-conducive if played at low volume.

Unlike DWM, which comes in a standard CD jewel case, DWM Re:Heat comes in a flexible transparent plastic sleeve containing a loose cover and two squares of protective black cardboard.

== Response and public exposure ==
Professional ratings
Review scores
Source	Rating
Steve Roach	"stunning"

Steve Roach, a highly respected ambient musician, has written a very complimentary review of DWM Re:Heat on his website, describing the album as "stunning dark drift" and "worthy of endless loop playback", and he even sold the album from his online store while stocks lasted. The album has also been highly praised^{[usurped]} by Aural Pressure, a website specialising in dark ambient, experimental, industrial, rhythmic noise, power electronics and neoclassical music.

In 2005, some of the album was broadcast on Dutch Radio 4FM (now known as NPS Studio 6).

== Free audio ==
A 60-second sample is available from the Manifold Records website.
