= Dead Weather Machine =

Studio album by SleepResearch Facility
- Released: 2004
- Recorded: Somnambulab, Glasgow, 2004
- Genre: Dark ambient
- Length: 73:49
- Label: Manifold Records
- Producer: Kevin Doherty

SleepResearch Facility chronology
Nostromo (2001)	Dead Weather Machine (2004)	Dead Weather Machine Re:Heat (2004)

Dead Weather Machine (sometimes abbreviated to DWM) is the second album by dark ambient artist SleepResearch_Facility. It is the first of a two-part set, followed by Dead Weather Machine Re:Heat (also known as DWM Re:Heat).

== Overview ==
The album was created through an exercise in sample manipulation using exclusive source audio, featuring audio generated by swinging a microphone in front of a malfunctioning heating unit. The heating unit's internal mechanics, described on the cover as being compromised by age and particulate buildup, produced the recorded sounds.

SleepResearch_Facility made a three-minute recording of the Dimplex Tango2 heater and created DWM and DWM Re:Heat from the clip, "using only about three or four very powerful pieces of software to mutate and mix/layer the sound." The original recording of the Tango2 heater is included as a hidden track at the end of the album. A photo of the inside of the heater was also made available on the Audio Project Archive page of the official website.

The promotional text for the album, written by Manifold Records, told listeners to "imagine being as small as a piece of dust, trekking through some enormous, dying mechanical landscape, the sounds of world-sized storms swirling all around you."

The original 2004 release was a limited-edition run of 1,000 copies.

== Track listing ==
Track	Name	Duration
1	"2.1"	11:54
2	"2.2"	6:40
3	"2.3"	13:34
4	"2.4"	6:06
5	"2.5"	9:00
6	"2.6"	8:40
7	"2.7"	8:09
7	Hidden track (*)	3:12

(*) Follows "2.7" after 6:30 of silence

The text "untitled x 7 + 1 hidden = sum" is printed on the back of the CD box, suggesting that the seven main tracks have no official titles. However, on the back of the CD cover, the numbers "2.1" to "2.7" are printed, along with the duration of each corresponding track in minutes and seconds.

The following phrases are printed either on the inside of the CD tray, or in the CD booklet:

- [working with finite sound sources reinforces concepts of liberation through limitation]
- [passage through the digital domain spawns interesting new paradigms]
- 55.8 -75.3
- all noise integral
- 00.76-847-5-52
- further data added upon subsequent iterations
- patience is a game worth playing.

== Response and public exposure ==
Professional ratings
Review scores
Source	Rating
Steve Roach	favourable

Ambient musician Steve Roach gave DWM a favorable review, calling the album "worthy of endless loop playback." The album also received a positive review from Aural Pressure, a website specializing in dark ambient, experimental, industrial, rhythmic noise, power electronics, and neoclassical music.

In 2005, some of the album was broadcast on Dutch Radio 4FM, which was later known as NPS Studio 6, and is currently known as NPO Soul & Jazz.

== Free audio ==
The Audio Project Archive page of the official website links to the following relevant MP3 files:

File	Description
dimplex.01.128kmp3.mp3	The first 9:35 of "2.1".
dimplex.03.128kmp3.mp3	The raw unmixed version of "2.2". On the album, this starts fading into the mix at 9:15 in track 1, and continues until the end of track 2.
dimplex.04.128kmp3.mp3	The raw unmixed version of "2.5".
dimplex.05.128kmp3.mp3	The raw unmixed version of "2.4". On the album, this starts fading into the mix at 11:44 in track 3, and continues until the end of track 4.
dimplex.07.128kmp3.mp3	The raw unmixed version of "2.6". On the album, this starts fading into the mix at 1:13 in track 6, and ends at 8:13 in the same track.
dimplex.00.128kmp3.mp3	The hidden track at the end of the album (the original three-minute source recording).

A 60-second sample of "2.1" is available from the Manifold Records website, although the page incorrectly indicates that the sample is taken from "2.2".

Hungbunny's 50th podcast, Silence is Golden, begins with "2.1".
