= Psychedelic Desert =

Noise ambient group from Osaka, Japan

Psychedelic Desert is a noise ambient group from Osaka, Japan. Psychedelic Desert's music ranges from ambient drone soundscapes to layers of fluctuating sounds which stimulate the brainwaves of the listener. The band toured in Australia in 2008 and performed on two European tours and on various festivals in 2008 - 2010 (France, Switzerland, Germany, Italy, Slovenia, Netherlands) and released several albums, EPs and appeared on Pharmafabrik compilation albums Fabriksampler with artists Lull, Final, Nordvargr, KK Null and remixed a track for PureH on the album Signia. The band also host special music installation events called Liquid Beat Hotel in Otoya, Kobe and Osaka.
