= Cold Spring (label) =

English independent record label

- Founded: 1990
- Founder: Justin Mitchell
- Genre: Various
- Country of origin: England
- Location: Northamptonshire
- Official website: coldspring.co.uk

Cold Spring is an independent record label based in Northamptonshire, England, specialising in "all forms of extreme media, but particularly: dark ambient, neo-classical/neo-folk, orchestral, power electronics/noise, Japanese noise, minimal, death industrial, dark soundtracks, experimental, obscure electronics from Russia, China, Japan, Poland and others."

== History ==
=== Beginnings ===
The label is owned, and run, by Justin Mitchell who had been working for Thee Temple ov Psychick Youth, a radical occult group from the 1980s. Mitchell had started out listening to early electronic music around the late 1970s, early 1980s. This included bands like Soft Cell and The Human League. From listening to this genre of music Mitchell progressed into the different fields of electronic and experimental music including artists like Genesis P-Orridge. Mitchell began getting involved in the music industry after be involved in re-issuing some cassette releases from his project Satori. These releases originated from around 1984 and were released by another label.

=== 1990–1999 ===
Cold Spring began releasing recordings in 1988 by mail order, then in 1997 began selling and distributing releases on the internet. After releasing a handful of cassette releases by artists such as The Grey Wolves and Genesis P-Orridge. Cold Spring released their first vinyl compilation album "...And the Wolf Shall Lick The Jewels From Your Belly" (CSR 1LP). This was in 1990 and featured artists such as The Grey Wolves, Crash Worship and The Hafler Trio. The next planned release, (CSR 2LP) would have been a split album between Alan Moore and Psychic TV but was withdrawn due to major label pressure. It wasn't until 1992 that Cold Spring released their next release Asesinos by Crash Worship. This would be the first CD release by the label. In 1999 Cold Spring released the Genesis P-Orridge and Merzbow project titled A Perfect Pain. The album was an enormous success for Cold Spring, and one of the label's most requested titles.

=== 2000–present ===
An untitled collaboration between American artists Boyd Rice and Z'EV produced a two track vinyl release in September 2008. The following year, EV released an album titled Sum Things. It consisted of archive material reflecting his take on the dark ambient genre of music. The tracks were recorded between December 2005 and March 2006. 2009 also saw Cold Spring re-release Anni Hogans Kickabye. The original EP was re-packaged including ten extra tracks; Kickabye featured artists such as Marc Almond and Nick Cave. In 2010 former Siouxsie and the Banshees member, Steven Severin released his debut album for Cold Spring titled Blood of a Poet. The album is a recording of his soundtrack for a 1930 silent movie by Jean Cocteau.

== Notable artists ==
- Barry Adamson
- Steve Albini
- All Hail the Transcending Ghost
- Marc Almond
- Kristian Eidnes Andersen
- Art Montage Terrorism
- Dave Ball
- Jac Berrocal
- Bow Gamelan Ensemble
- British Electric Foundation
- William S. Burroughs
- C.C.C.C.
- Igor Cavalera
- A Challenge of Honour
- Coil
- Controlled Death
- Corrupted
- Crash Worship
- Current 93
- Dead Voices on Air
- F.M. Einheit
- Shane Embury
- David Fenech
- George Fenton
- Folkstorm
- Goatvargr
- Godflesh
- Brion Gysin
- The Hafler Trio
- Hijokaidan
- Hirsute Pursuit
- Anni Hogan
- Incapacitants
- Jarboe
- Edward Ka-Spel
- Karjalan Sissit
- Kreuzweg Ost
- Laibach
- Bill Laswell
- Andrew Liles
- Little Annie
- Lull
- Machinefabriek
- Masonna
- Meat Beat Manifesto
- Merzbow
- Mesektet
- Minóy
- Mz.412
- Nadja
- Pete Namlook
- Nine Inch Nails - Recoiled
- Nordvargr
- Nytt Land
- Genesis P-Orridge
- Balázs Pándi
- Pan Sonic
- Krzysztof Penderecki
- Pitchshifter
- Prurient
- Psychic TV
- Sun Ra
- Boyd Rice
- Penny Rimbaud
- Steven Severin
- Shinjuku Thief
- Skitliv
- Skullflower
- SleepResearch_Facility
- Sol Invictus
- SPK
- Mark Spybey
- T.A.G.C.
- The Telescopes
- Toroidh
- Trepaneringsritualen
- Troum
- Von Thronstahl
- Martyn Ware
- John Watermann
- Werkraum
- Phil Western
- John Wiese
- Z'EV
- Zeni Geva
- Zos Kia
