= Pavel Zhagun =

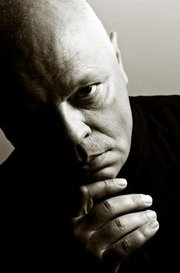
- Born: May 22, 1954 (age 72); Chelyabinsk, Russia
- Other name: Piezo
- Occupations: Poet, musician, producer, artist

Pavel Nikolayevich Zhagun (Russian: Павел Николаевич Жагун; born May 22, 1954, in Chelyabinsk, Russia) is a Russian poet, musician, record producer, artist, and curator. Zhagun was raised in Ukraine and graduated from R.M. Glier Kiev Institute of Music as a trumpet player.

== Career ==
Between 1970 and 1980 he worked in various symphonic and jazz bands: from 1971 to 1975 in the progressive jazz-rock band Bells, from 1974 to 1976 in the Ukrainian Radio & Television Symphony Orchestra, the bands Charivny Gitary and Krasnye Maki and was concertmaster of Georgian State Jazz Orchestra. In the 1980s Pavel played in the band (Alla Pugacheva). Since the late 1980s he worked on solo industrial-noise projects and produced several indie-bands.

During 1988–1989 Zhagun founded and produced the bands Scandal and Moral Codex. He continues to work with Moral Codex.

During 1991–92 Pavel participated in a number of Russian post-industrial electronic projects, Atomic Biscuit Orchestra, Joint Committee and F.R.U.I.T.S. (with Alexei Borisov). Since 2000 he wrote music for films, such as 24 Часа by Alexander Atanesyan) and art performances, working as a curator of Khankhalaev Gallery and began painting and creating graphic works. Zhagun is currently living in Moscow and owns the 0˚ internet record label. His current solo electronic music project is called Piezo.

== Literary career ==
- 2007 – Zhagun published avant-garde poems and prose, which he had written since the middle of the 1970s and released a book of poems "Radiolarias" – Vodoley Publishers.
- 2008 – book of poems "IN4" – Pushkin Fund publishing.
- 2008 – Pavel became organizer and a participant of an annual festival of sound-art and contemporary poetry "Poetronica".
- 2009 – book of poems "Scarlet Letter of Speed" – Pushkin Fund publishing.
- 2009 – Pavel was short-listed for Andrei Bely Prize.
- 2009 — novel-transformer "Kaliostro's Dust" – published by Argo-Risk and Knizhnoe Obozrenie.
- 2010 – book of poems "Carte Blanche" – published by Argo-Risk and Knizhnoe Obozrenie.

== Discography ==
- 2011 – "SILF" – Nostress Netlabel
- 2010 — "ARTIFICATION" — Rhizomatique
- 2009 — "4444" – 0˙Records
- 2008 — "Xaioiax" — Koyuki Records
- 2005 — "BRUT" — 0˙Records
- 2001 — "Music for Machines" — Exotica Records
- 2001 — "Lighting Ice Generator" — V/A "Tell Tchaikovsky The News Vol. 3" Exotica Lights
- 2001 — "Stepindustria" — V/A "Tell Tchaikovsky The News Vol. 2" Exotica Lights
- 1999 — "Blue Fluff On The Black Hat" — V/A "Tell Tchaikovsky The News" Exotica Lights
- 1999 — "Aquasonic" Live CD-R Noart Records
- 1996 — "Magnetto" — Noart Records
- 1996 — "Celluloid Solution" — V/A "Transsiberian Express" Purple Legion
- 1992 — "Xenomania" — CD-R Noart Records
- 1991 — "Toxic Tranzistor" — CD-R Noart Records
- 1991 — "Dead Fish And Luminous Air" — CD-R Noart Records
- 1990 — "Toyz Of The Noize" — CD-R Noart Records
- 1989 — "Noisereconstruction" — CD-R Noart Records
- 1988 — "Moto 2000" — 0˙Records
- 1987 — "Rubber Japan" — 0˙Records
- 1986 — "Honey Phosphorus" — 0˙Records
- 1985 — "Clorox of molecule" — 0˙Record
- 1984 — "Glass Idol" — 0˙Records

== Selected discography of F.R.U.I.T.S. ==
- 1997 — "Elektrostatic" (Exotica Records)
- 1998 – F.R.U.I.T.S. & Sa-Zna "Amber Rooms" (CD) (Exotica Records / GMB R&I, Russia)
- 2000 – Acid report 1996 (CD-R, Grief recordings)
- 2000 – Studio recordings 1992–1993 vol.1 (CD-R, N&B research digest)
- 2001 – Jakuzi (CD, Exotica Records)
- 2001 – "Lakmus" (CD-R, Xerxes rec., Japan)
- 2004 – "Forbidden Beat" (CD, Laton, Austria)
