= Blaakyum =

Lebanese metal band

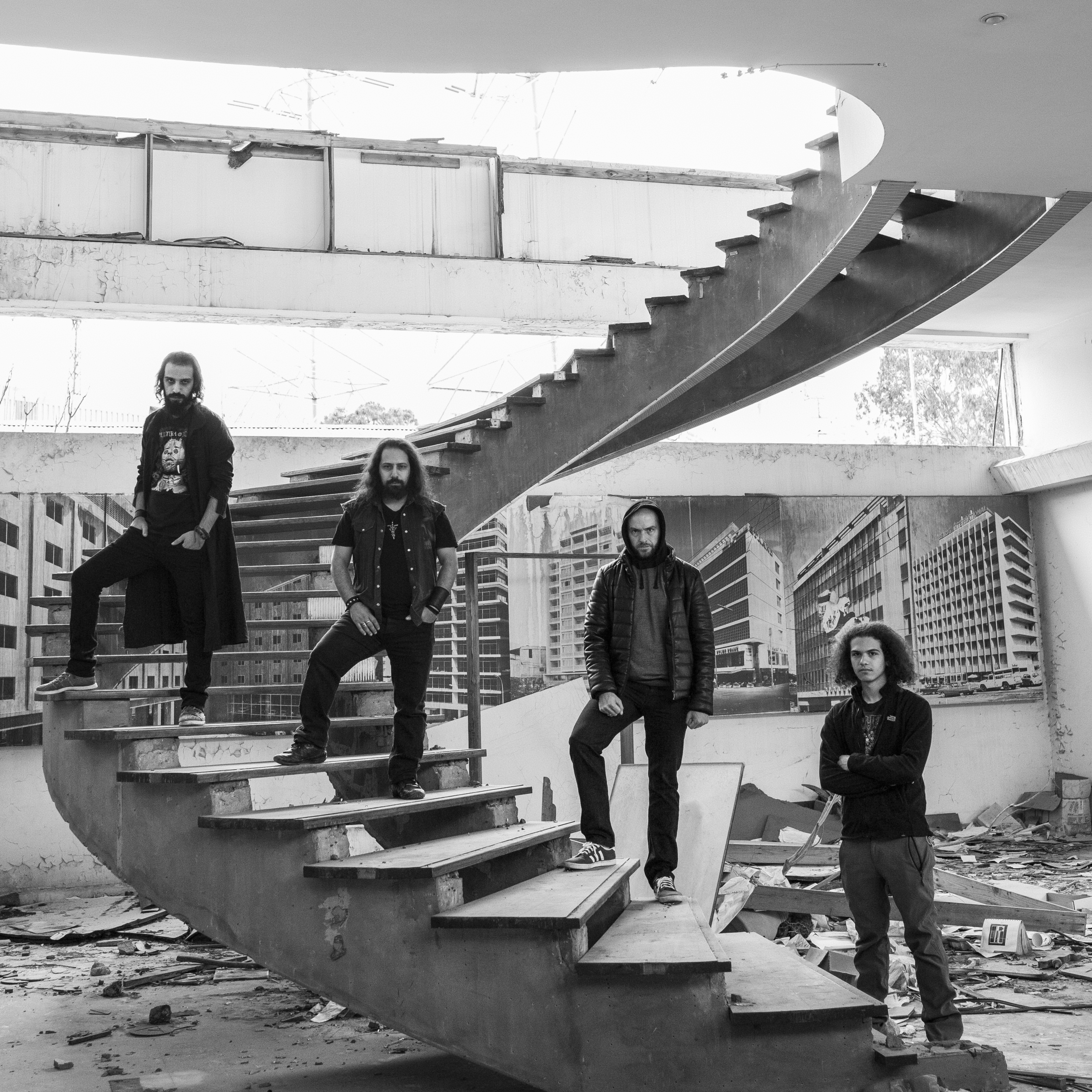
- BLAAKYUM (Rabih, Bassem, Pierre, Hassan, Ziad)

Background information
- Origin: Beirut, Lebanon
- Genres: Folk metal, oriental metal, thrash metal, heavy metal.
- Years active: 1995–2001; 2007–present
- Label: Unsigned
- Members: Bassem Deaïbess; Rabih Deaïbess; Pierre Le Port; Hassan Khoder; Ziad Eido
- Past members: Samer Deaïbess; Shant Bajac; Vik Bajac; Jean-Pierre Mattar; Jad Saad; Elias Njeim; David Elias; Jad Feitrouni; Ghassan Sakr; Jad Nohra; Karim Zouhairy; Rany Battikh
- Website: www.blaakyum.com

Blaakyum is a Lebanese metal band from Beirut, founded in 1995 by Bassem Deaibess. Blaakyum's style is a blend of Thrash, heavy and groove metal infused with Middle Eastern and Levantine folk music". To this end, the band incorporates the goblet drum into its music.The band's first studio album, Lord of the Night, was released on Friday the 13th of January 2012. Blaakyum released its second album, Line of Fear, on the 25th of June 2016. The band's last tour started at the Tuska festival, and continued with the "Thrash Mercenaries" Tour 2016, headed by Onslaught.

== History ==
=== Origins (1995–1997) ===
Blaakyum was formed in summer of 1995, five years after the end of the Lebanese Civil War, with original members: Bassem Deaibess (vocals/rhythm guitar), Maroun Azar (guitar/harmonica), Jean Saad (drums), Jad Nohra (lead guitar). Blaakyum started performing without a bassist and covered pop/rock songs and spiritual songs in front of churches. Meanwhile, Maroun Azar left the band to concentrate on studying medicine, and Jead Abdallah was asked to join the band as a Bassist since he is originally a guitarist but he couldn't fill that part so he decided to help the band in management.

Blaakyum then switched styles into grunge-punk and performed their first gig at The Lebanese University Faculty Of Human Science—Fanar without a bassist on most of the songs, except for some were handled by Generation X's (A Lebanese rock Band at the time) bassist. During 1996 Blaakyum auditioned several Bassists and the final choice was on Bassem's (Vocalist) brother Samer Deaibess to take the position. And then the band Switched to thrash metal performing mainly Metallica songs. With the change of style Blaakyum started performing in many concerts and in pubs, including Rock Concert 1 and 2 at Beirut Hall. At this time the band performed Doom/Black and Thrash metal songs, and by 1997 the bands set list was all originals. After dispute on musical differences and personal obligations, Jad Nohra and Samer Deaibess left the band. Mano was brought to fill in the bass role and the band started looking for a lead guitarist. after trying a couple of guitarists they found Shant Bajac, but Bajac had also official exams so he also left. Nohra rejoined the band, but things didn't work out, and he insisted that Bassem Deaibess would quit singing and concentrate on the rhythm Guitar, in the same time he started another band with Mano and Saad called "Society".

Deaibess then met Vic Bajac (Shant's elder brother) in a rehearsal center where "Society" were rehearsing, and they decide to reform Blaakyum.

=== 1998–2001 ===
By 1998, the band changed their style into a blend of Thrash, Heavy and Groove Metal infused with Middle Eastern and Levantine folk-music vibes, a nod to the band's origins and influences, coming from a country that straddles eastern and western civilizations on the south-eastern coast of the Mediterranean and with members inspired by Metallica, Testament, Overkill, Annihilator, Onslaught, Slayer and Iron Maiden, just to name a few, along with oriental music icons such as Fairouz, Sabah and Marcel Khalife.

Winning the Lebanese Bands Competition in 1997, Blaakyum released its first single, "Am I Black", in 1998, at the height of the anti-Metal witch hunt conducted by the Lebanese religious and political authorities, who considered anyone affiliated with the scene a national threat, and during which the band's founder and frontman, Bassem Deaibess, was detained and jailed simply for being a heavy-metal musician and fan.

Due to Lebanon's dire economic conditions and a mixture of personal and health problems that hit the band's members, Blaakyum was forced to split in 2001. Deaibess continued to perform with other bands. In 2006, war hit Lebanon again, destroying much of its infrastructure (electricity, water, roads), which remains in disarray.

=== 2007–present ===
But by the end of 2007, Blaakyum was back with fresh new members that Deaibess picked from the new generation: Gio Najarian (Drums), Rany Battikh (Bass). Later this year they won the Lebanese Nationals in the Global Battle of the Bands (GBOB), representing Lebanon in London. Among 3,000 bands that participated in the GBOB and 35 finalists, Blaakyum earned the seventh place. The following year, Blaakyum entered the studio to record its debut album, a process that took more than four years to be completed. The band released "Lord Of The Night" on Friday, 13 January 2012 which was well received by critics. In 2012 another wave of anti-Metal Music took place and Bassem Deaibess was detained for the second time.

Blaakyum set on the "Night Lords" tour that took it all over Lebanon as well as Egypt at Metal Blast Festival. The tour also had shows at Metal Heads' Mission 2012 in Ukraine, MetalCamp 2012 in Slovenia, and playing gigs in Slovakia (Bratislava—Randal Club) and Poland (Warsaw—Progresjia Club). Blaakyum subsequently performed on the main stage at Metaldays 2013 (formerly MetalCamp) and began working on its second album.

In 2015, Blaakyum became the Middle East winner of Wacken Open Air's Metal Battle. And achieved third place in the 2015 worldwide finals of the Metal Battle at Wacken Open Air Germany,

On 4 April 2017, Blaakyum announced the official video for the track 'Freedom Denied' on Metal Hammer. The track deals with the political event called the Arab Spring.

== Members ==
=== Current ===
- Bassem Deaibess – vocals, rhythm guitar (1995–present)
- Pierre Le Port – bass guitar (2016–present)
- Rabih Deaibess – lead guitar (2012–present)
- Hassan Khoder – drummer (2016–present)

Sessionists:

- Ziad Eido – Darbuka Arabic folk percussion(2015–present)

=== Former ===
- Samer Deaïbess – bass guitar
- Shant Bajac – Lead guitar
- Vik Bajac – bass guitar
- Jean-Pierre Mattar – lead guitar
- Jad Saad – drummer
- Elias Njeim – lead guitar
- David Elias – drummer
- Jad Feitrouni – drummer
- Ghassan Sakr – drummer
- Jad Nohra – lead guitar
- Karim Zouhairy – lead guitar
- Rany Battikh - Bass

== Discography ==
=== Studio albums ===
- Lord of the Night (2012) - 13 songs:
  - Dark Moon
  - Lord of the Night (feat Wissam Tabet)
  - The Last Stand
  - Cease Fire
  - Am I Black (feat Wissam Tabet)
  - Journey to Eternity (feat. Wissam Tabet)
  - Battle Roar
  - The Land
  - Awakened Dreams (feat. Wissam Tabet)
  - March of the Eastern Man (feat. Wissam Tabet)
  - Rip It Off
  - Living Forever
  - Dark Symphony
- Line of Fear (2016) - 8 songs:
  - Crossing
  - The Line of Fear
  - Wicked Revelation
  - Destined to Rise
  - Baal-Adon
  - Religion of Peace
  - Freedom Denied
  - I Am Who I Am

=== Singles ===
- "Riot against Riot" (2016)

== Awards ==
- W:O:A Metal Battle 2015 Finals—Winner 3rd place
- W:O:A: Middle East Metal Battle 2015—Winner 1st place
- GBOB Lebanon 2007 Champion (1st place)
- Lebanese Band Competition 1997 (1st place)
