= Manifold Records =

Manifold Records is a US-based record label and mailorder store specializing in experimental, ambient and other hard-to-define audio materials. Begun in 1993 by writer and zine-publisher Vince Harrigan, the label has released works by Gravitar, Final (Justin Broadrick of Godflesh), Mick Harris, Lull, Steve Roach, Jeph Jerman, Maeror Tri, Ultra Milkmaids, Maurizio Bianchi, Aube and others.

The label was briefly a critical favorite during the mid-1990s, being at the forefront of a short-lived genre called Isolationism through the label's unusual compilations. These compilations were novel in that they featured traditionally Ambient and New Age artists alongside Noisier, edgier acts and yet seemed to "work" as cohesive documents. The label has also released numerous special-packaging releases; compact discs in metal sheathes, vinyl records attached to saw blades, water-filled plastic sleeves, etc.

The Manifold Records label was never very prolific or widely distributed, likely due to the unusual nature of much of the material and the labels seeming inability to stay within any genre from release to release. Manifold Records ceased operating a mailorder website in 2007. The Manifold Records label continues, as does limited online sales of releases through other distributors and eBay.

== Manifold artists ==
- Alan Licht
- Arto Lindsay
- Aube
- Beequeen
- Crawl Unit
- DJ Spooky
- Final
- Gravitar
- Hands To
- Illusion Of Safety
- KK Null
- Lull
- Maeror Tri
- Mahoroba
- Mandible Chatter
- Maurizio Bianchi
- Paul Schütze
- Rapoon
- Robert Rich
- Scott Solter
- SleepResearch Facility
- Steve Roach
- Ultra Milkmaids
- Voice Of Eye

== See also ==
- List of record labels
