= Incinery =

British thrash metal band

- Origin: England, United Kingdom
- Genres: Thrash metal, heavy metal
- Years active: 2009–present
- Members: James Rawlings; Chris Kenny; Jason Chaikeawrung; David Jordan; Ste Dudley
- Past members: Leigh Chambers; Dominic Bishop

Incinery are a British thrash metal band from the Midlands. Founded in early 2009 by guitarists Jason Chaikeawrung and Chris Kenny, Incinery consist of five members. Their music has been described as the speed and ferocity of 80s thrash metal injected with a more modern edge. The band has been compared with Exodus, Sodom, and early Sepultura.

== History ==
=== Early years and formation (2009-2014) ===
Building a reputation for high-energy performances, Incinery toured their first EPs Dawn of War (2011) and Nothing Left (2013) and won the 'Metal 2 the Masses' initiative in 2012, resulting in a live performance on the New Blood Stage at Bloodstock Open Air festival. Following this performance, bassist Dominic Bishop was fired from the band, a decision made to allow founding member David Jordan to rejoin. Shortly after, Incinery were invited to play the 2nd stage at Metaldays 2013 in Slovenia as a result of the performance at Bloodstock. Such performances have enabled them to share stages with Onslaught, Savage Messiah, Bonded by Blood and Lawnmower Deth.

=== Dead, Bound and Buried (2014-present) ===
Incinery's first full-length album Dead, Bound and Buried was released in 2014. It was produced by Chris Tsangarides.

2014-2016 also saw performances at the Boardie Stage Takeover at Download Festival 2014, Nottingham Rock City, Damnation Festival 2015, and in support of Exodus at the Rescue Rooms in Nottingham. In February 2018 Incinery played at the Hard Rock Hell Metal Meltdown festival in Birmingham.

== Members ==
Current

- James Rawlings - Vocals
- Jason Chaikeawrung - Guitar
- Chris Kenny - Guitar
- Gary Stuart - Bass
- Ste Dudley - Drums

Former

- David Jordan - Bass
- Leigh Chambers - Guitar
- Dominic Bishop - Bass
- James Barker - Bass

== Discography ==
EPs

- Dawn of War (2011)
- Nothing Left (2013)

Studio albums

- Dead, Bound and Buried (2014)
- Hollow Earth Theory (2020)
