= Extreme Smoke =

Extreme Smoke 57
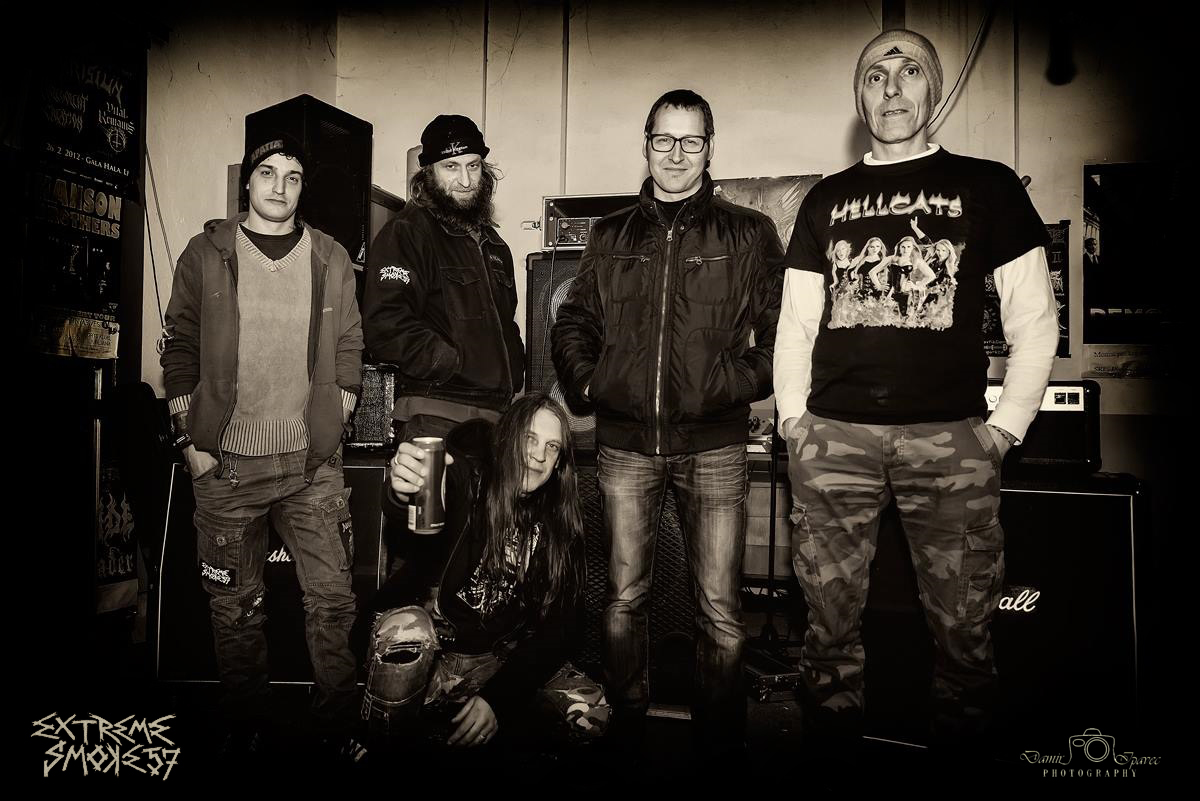

Background information
- Origin: Nova Gorica, Slovenia
- Genres: Grindcore
- Years active: 1990–1992; 2008–present
- Labels: D.I.Y. worldwide
- Members: Boco, Miha, Briljo, Gaber
- Past members: Kurja, Šerc, Gogo (R.I.P.), Kopa, Cigo, Boštjan, Edi
- Website: Official Facebook page

Extreme Smoke 57 is a Slovenian grindcore band formed in early 1990 in the city of Nova Gorica. Their influences include bands such as Napalm Death, Sore Throat, Fear of God, Seven Minutes of Nausea and Agathocles. Band members have played in different grindcore/noisecore/crust/drone/hardcore acts like Patareni, Deeper Than World, Cadlag, PureH, Mozak, Panic Overdose, Absent Minded, Ear Slaughter, Diarrhoea, Strobodeath and Psihoza. Extreme Smoke 57 split in 1992, but reformed in 2008. Since their reunion the band has performed on some well-known European music festivals such as Metaldays, Obscene Extreme, EXIT and Punk Rock holiday. In January 2016 "Corruption deteriorates" (10-inch LP) was released by band itself. In July 2017 their latest studio material was released as a split 7-inch EP with Belgian grindcore veterans Agathocles. In March 2018 a compilation CD that includes studio recordings from 1991 to 2018 was released on Independent Woman records from New Zealand. The compilation comes with bonus mini CD that includes their final show before split in 1992.

== Line up ==
- Miha – guitar
- Boco – vocals
- Briljo – bass
- Gaber – drums

== Discography ==
- 1991 – Live in Koper, 8.3.1991 + studio demo #2 (Musical Destruction Tapes)
- 1991 – Open Your Eyes… & Die! studio demo #3 (Wild Rags Records)
- 1992 - Extreme Smoke 57 / The Sexorcist split 7-inch EP (Sicktone Records)
- 1992 - Second 7-inch EP (7-inch, Psychomania Records)
- 1992 - Live in Leipzig/ Germany, 28.9.1991 live tape
- 1993 - Extreme Smoke 57 / Agathocles split tape
- 1996 – Who Sold The Scene?!? 7-inch EP (TVG Records)
- 1998 – D.I.Y. collection tape
- 2004 - Extreme Smoke 57 / PATARENI split LP (bootleg)
- 2012 - Extreme Smoke 57 / H-INCIDENT split 7-inch EP
- 2013 - Extreme Smoke 57 / DECA DEBILANE split 7-inch EP (Debila Records)
- 2013 – Official Live Tape (Old Grindered Days Records)
- 2014 – Life Of No Dreams CD (Necrothrash Records)
- 2014 - Extreme Smoke 57 / 2 MINUTA DREKA split 7-inch EP
- 2014 – Who Sold The Scene?!? Live 3 DVD (Pharmafabric Records)
- 2015 – Live On Radio Student CD (self-released)
- 2016 – Corruption Deteriorates 10-inch LP (self-released)
- 2017 - Extreme Smoke 57 / Agathocles – split 7-inch EP (On Parole Productions)
