= Alexei Borisov =

Russian musician

Alexei Borisov Алeксeй Юpьeвич Борисов Alexei Yurievich Borisov
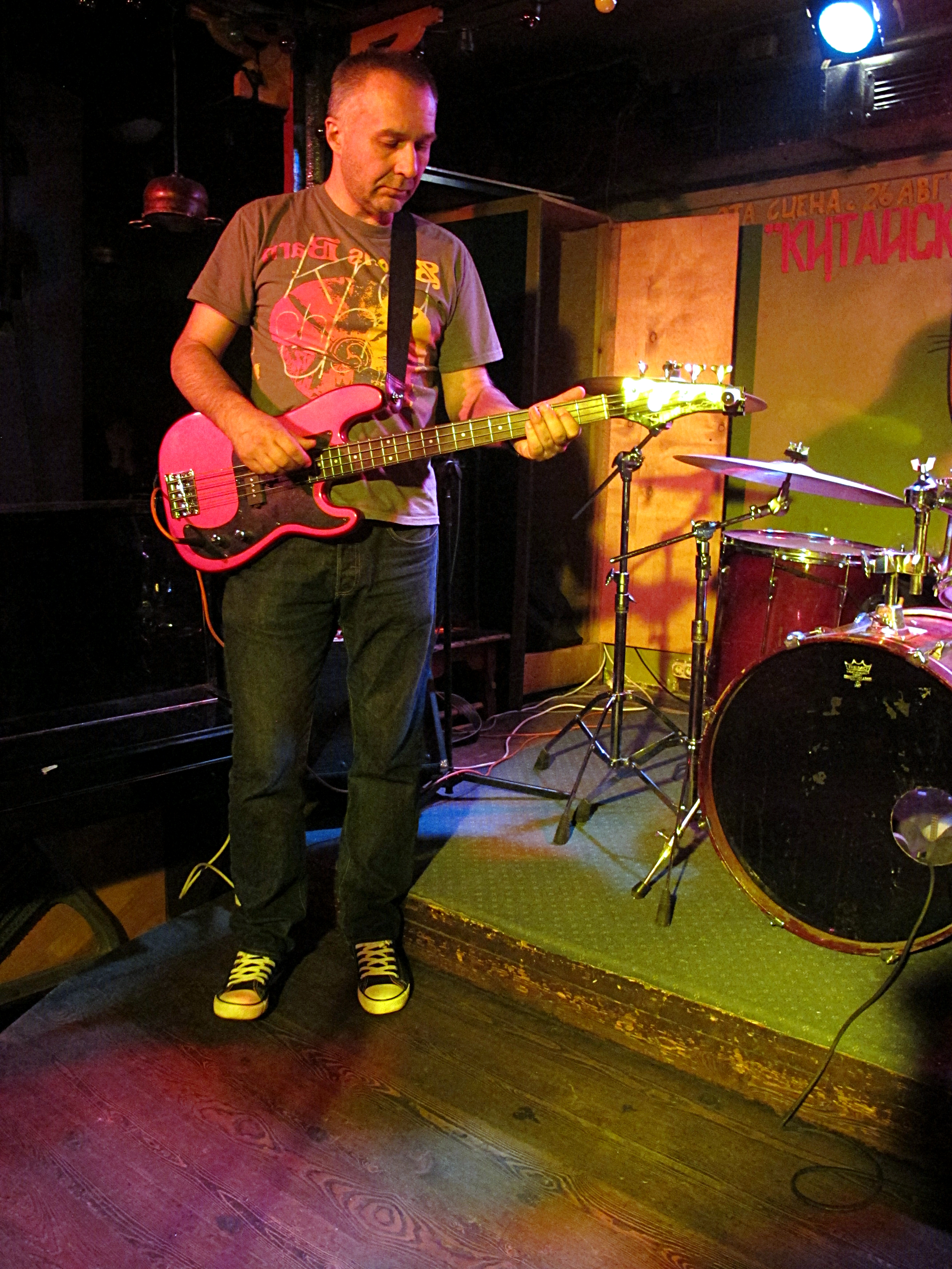
- Alexei Borisov in 2013

Background information
- Born: December 7, 1960 (age 65)
- Genre: Underground
- Occupation: Musician
- Member of: Night Prospekt, F.R.U.I.T.S., Volga, ASTMA, Fake Cats Project

Alexei Yurievich Borisov (Russian: Алeксeй Юpьeвич Борисов) (born 7 December 1960) is a Russian musician, active in the Russian underground music scene since the beginning of the 1980s, and a member of Night Prospekt, F.R.U.I.T.S., Volga, ASTMA, Fake Cats Project and various other projects.

== Biography ==
Born in Moscow in 1960, Borisov graduated from Moscow State University in History and Arts. His controversial performing career as a guitarist began in the new-wave group Center in 1980. The following year he formed the mod band Prospekt, remodelled in 1985 as the shifting Night Prospekt, with partner Ivan Sokolovsky. After the dissolution of the band at the beginning of the 1990s, he joined the "noise reconstruction and techno acoustics" duo F.R.U.I.T.S. with Pavel Zhagun, and played in various short-lived art/noise/industrial acts including Joint Committee, Atomic Bisquit Orchestra And Sever.

Borisov and his previous associate, experimental Finnish sound artist Anton Nikkila, established their own N&B Research Digest label in 2000.

Among his other collaborations are joint projects with the performance artists North (Russia), KK Null (Japan), Jeffrey Surak (USA), Leif Elggren (Sweden), Kurt Liedwart (Russia). Borisov also collaborates with the video-artist Roman Anikushin, multimedia artists Aristarh Chernishev and Vladislav Efimov, and also with Olga Subbotina, Moscow theatre director. Borisov later produced much solo material. He also works as a DJ in clubs and on radio and has contributed as a journalist to some Russian publications ("Bulldozer", "Ptjuch", "Fuzz", "Downtown", "man'Music", etc.) and some foreign ones ("B'Mag", "Technikart").

He is portrayed in the 2013 music documentary Elektro Moskva. Alexei Borisov founded Fake Cats Project with Igor Levshin and Kirill Makushin in January 2015. He is currently a journalist at the Data.Wave webzine.

== Discography ==
- "Before the Evroremont" on N&B Research Digest (2002)
- "Polished Surface of a Table" on Electroshock Records (2004)
- "Typical Human Beings" on N&B Research Digest (2004)
- "Where Are They Now" on N&B Research Digest (2007)
- "Elektrokooperativ" on Industrial Culture Records/Art Liberation (2010)
- "Massive Ground Control" (with Kurt Liedwart) on Zeromoon (2017)
- "Memento" (with Alexander Kibanov, Cisfinitum, Alexei Bortnichuk, Hutopia) on Nazlo Records (2018)
- "Oxford News" (with Lidya Kavina, Sergey Letov, Vladimir Kitliar, Misha Salnikov) (2018)
- "Dada 100" on Attenuation Circuit (2019)

== With Fake Cats Project ==
- "Fake Cat Songs" on Surrism-Phonoethics (2015)
- "Sad Songs" on Surrism-Phonoethics (2015)
- "Love Is A Ping Pong Ball" on Etched Traumas (2016)
- "Russian Canon" on Frozen Light (2016)
- "Temptations" on Vulpiano Records (2016)

== Compilation appearances ==
- "Truth" on ...It Just Is (2005)
- "Disclose" on Fabriksampler V2 Pharmafabrik (2008)
