= Nostromo (album) =

Studio album by SleepResearch Facility
- Released: 2001 / 2007
- Recorded: Somnambu-Lab, Glasgow, 2000-2001
- Genre: Dark ambient
- Length: 61:50 / 69:25
- Label: Cold Spring
- Producer: Kevin Doherty

SleepResearch Facility chronology
Nostromo (2001)	Dead Weather Machine (2004)

Nostromo is the debut album by dark ambient artist SleepResearch Facility. The original release in 2001 was a limited edition (only 1000 copies were manufactured), and has now sold out. However, a re-issue was released on 5 December 2007, which includes a new bonus track called "Narcissus".

== Overview and inspiration ==
Nostromo is mainly inspired by the fictional spaceship of the same name in the 1979 science fiction/horror film Alien. Kevin Doherty, the single member of SleepResearch Facility, has described this film as "a masterpiece of dark atmospheres and brooding suspense", adding that it is "my all time favorite film". At the beginning of the film, the ship is travelling through deep space, and its seven-human crew members are unconscious in hypersleep. The ship is dark and quiet, but not silent – all manner of mechanical and electronic systems are slowly ticking over, producing a ceaseless flow of low background noise.

The album Nostromo explores this shadowy, haunting atmosphere, taking the listener on a deep aural journey through the ship's decks. In the film, the Nostromo has three decks (A, B and C), but the album adds two more fictitious decks, D and E, with one CD track per deck. Each track flows smoothly into the next, with no gaps of silence in-between, and as with all of SleepResearch_Facility's music, Nostromo is very sleep-conducive if played at low volume.

The bonus track Narcissus on the 2007 reissue is named after the fictional spaceship in Alien; the Narcissus is the lifeboat of the Nostromo.

The album's main aural components are: loops of deep pulsating bass (especially in "a-deck" and "d-deck"), washes of smooth industrial noise, mysterious droning synthesiser chords (particularly in "b-deck" and "c-deck"), electrostatic crackling, and other deep mechanical sounds. Kevin Doherty has said that the creation of Nostromo involved "synthesisers and such to generate things, lots of studio equipment like effects machines, radios, waves of feedback from analogue equipment looping back on itself and a big mixing desk to bind it all together on." More detailed information about the album's creation and inspiration can be found in the three known interviews with SleepResearch_Facility.

The CD booklet contains the following text:

- "Deep within Mother's mass the seven slept, frozen in caskets of ice..."
- "Quietly, she made her way home, only the quake and rumble of her mighty engines breaking the silence of endless vacuum..."
- "Shhh... In space no one can hear you dream..."

The third sentence is a variation on the well-known tagline from Alien: "In space no one can hear you scream."

== Track listing ==
The cover of the 2007 reissue.

Track	Name	Duration on 2001 issue	Duration on 2007 reissue
1	a-deck	14:01	14:00
2	b-deck	11:52	12:03
3	c-deck	11:57	11:46
4	d-deck	12:37	12:37
5	e-deck	11:21	11:04
6 (*)	Narcissus	—	7:52

(*) Bonus track on 2007 reissue.

== Hidden sounds ==
At a few points in the album, different sounds have been "hidden" (i.e. recorded at extremely low volume, so that they are inaudible during normal listening).

During the first minute or so of "a-deck", a recording has been hidden which sounds like an unaccompanied female (or high male) voice, singing in a major key, in a space with a long reverberation time (e.g. a cathedral).

At 5:14 in "a-deck", a recording of the Greenwich Time Signal has been hidden:

Greenwich Time Signal
Broadcast on many BBC radio stations at the end of each hour.

== Free audio ==
Complete copies of "a-deck" and "c-deck" are available from the Audio Project Archive page of the official website.

A copy of "Narcissus" and a 6-minute edit of "c-deck" are available on the official SR_F page on MySpace.

A 6-minute edit of "e-deck" is available on the Cold Spring page on MySpace.

A sample of the first 60 seconds of "e-deck" is available from the Cold Spring website.

== Response ==
Nostromo has been very well received, both by fans of dark ambient music, and by people with sleeping disorders. All four known reviews available on the Internet are extremely positive, and the artist's"Active Guestbook". Archived from the original on 7 April 2005. (now inactive) contains many compliments about the album.

== Reviews ==
Professional ratings
Review scores
Source	Rating
AmbiEntrance	(8.9/10)

- AmbiEntrance (another copy available here)
- (another copy available here)
- (another copy available here)
- These three reviews are also archived here
