= Prospect (Slovenian band) =

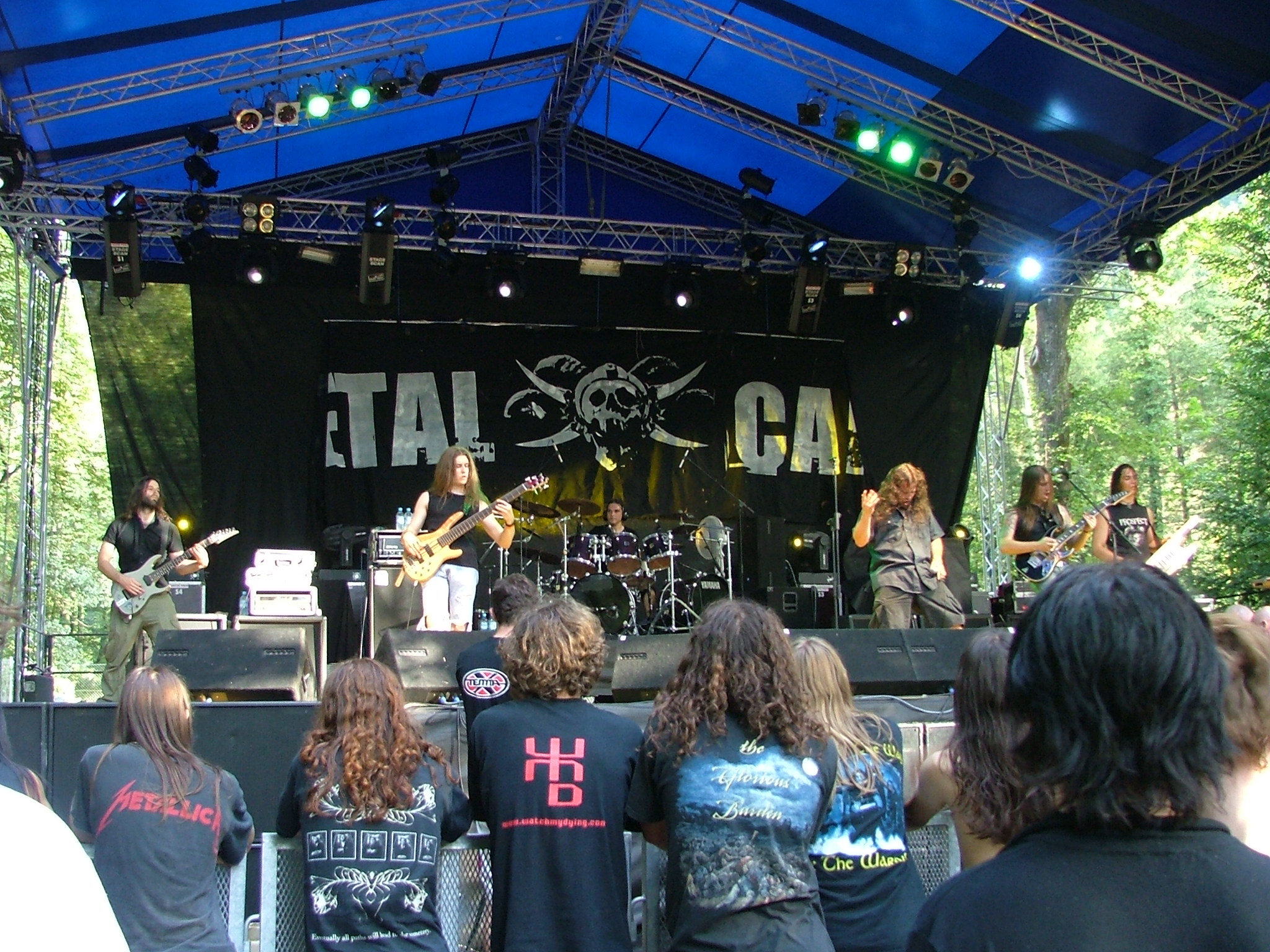
- Prospect performing live at Metalcamp, Tolmin, Slovenia, 2007.

Background information
- Origin: Ljubljana, Slovenia
- Genres: Progressive metal
- Years active: 1991−present
- Label: Fossil
- Members: Roman Fileš; Urban Medic; Robi Grdic; Dejan Pakiz; Peter Mlinar
- Past members: Simon Jovanovič; Jure Pockaj; Žele Jokič; Rok Plestenjak
- Website: www.prospectmusic.com

Prospect is a Slovenian progressive metal band from Ljubljana founded in 1991. Their influences include Queensrÿche, Fates Warning, Dream Theater and Iron Maiden. To be directed at the international market, the band writes all their lyrics in English.

== History ==
The band was founded in 1999 when their first album, #1 was released. The album was warmly accepted among local heavy metal fans and also abroad. In 2002, their second album, Moments, was released and Simon Jovanovič left the band and started his own project, Unspoken. After a long time of searching, Robi Grdič replaced him as vocalist. At some of their concerts, they were an opening band of Paul Di'Anno (former Iron Maiden member) during his tour in Ljubljana and Zagreb in 2001. For most of October 2003, they participated at The Bonded by Metal tour across Europe with bands such as Exodus, Agent Steel, Mortitian and Nuclear Assault. In 2005, they supported the band Queensrÿche during the Austrian part of their tour. Their new album, Chronicles of Men, was released in 2007. The official anthem of Metalcamp is written and performed by Prospect. The song can be downloaded from the Metalcamp homepage for free. In 2008, the band was set to participate in Propower Europe 2009.

== Band members ==
=== Current ===
- Roman Fileš − guitar
- Dejan Pakiz − keyboards
- Robi Grdic − vocals
- Urban Medic − bass guitar
- Peter Mlinar − drums

=== Former ===
- Jure Pockaj − vocals
- Simon Jovanovič − vocals
- Rok Plestenjak − keyboard
- Žele Jokič − bass guitar

== Discography ==
- #1 (1999)
- Moments (2002)
- Chronicles of Men (2007)
