= Patareni =

- Origin: Zagreb, Croatia
- Genres: Noise; Grindcore
- Years active: 1983-present
- Members: Gano - vocals Hadžo - guitar Spitoo - drums Zurko - bass
- Past members: Poda - drums Hrvoje Jagarinec - bass guitar Haš - vocals Snif - vocals (RIP); Giulio Baldizzone "The Bastard" - vocals
- Website: http://www.inet.hr/patareni/

Patareni are a hardcore punk, noise, and grindcore band from Zagreb, Croatia, formed in 1983. Owing to their formation at such an early date, they are considered to be one of the earliest grindcore bands.

Their discography is extensive, consisting of many CDs, LPs, and split singles with bands such as Extreme Noise Terror, Agathocles and Cripple Bastards. Through these releases they gained a reputation as a cult band and many bands have cited Patareni as being one of their primary influences, which prompted the release of A Tribute to the Patareni by Roots Records and F'K'O" in 1994. In 2009, Terrorizer listed Patareni's Back to the Roots as one of its top 20 essential European grindcore albums. James Hoare, writing for Terrorizer, said, "Much beloved by Anal Cunt's Seth Putnam, who felt moved enough to write to them back in the day, Croatia's Patareni were the band for whom the word 'raw' was coined. Hugely influential, some grindcore historians even argue they were the first. Either way, 'Back to the Roots' is a feats of strangely melodic crust and urgent stabs of grind like the twelve-second 'Sajkunda'."

Patareni guitarist Davor played also for Hladno Pivo, one of the most popular rock bands in Croatia and other countries of the former Yugoslavia.

Patareni drummer Poda played also for 1980s Serbian noise/grind/punk bands D.D.T and Fear of Dog, and various international hard core bands such as the Belgium crust punk band Visions of War, Olho de Gato from Holland, Migra Violenta from Argentina, and MDC (Millions of Dead Cops) from the United States of America.

Two members of Slovenian groups Extreme Smoke and PureH also occasionally played in Patareni in early 1990s. Former member Giulio the Bastard, of Italian grindcore band Cripple Bastards, has also sung for Patareni.

== Discography ==
=== Albums and EPs ===
- Deadland Massacre - 7"
- Untalented after all these seconds - 7"
- From Here To Eternity - Live In New Pingvinovo - 7"
- Demo #1,26-6-86 - 10"
- Odavde nas nitko nemre sterat - CD
- Good Bye, The Legends - 7"
- Worth mentioning - 7"
- I Wonder Who The Real Cannibals Are / There Can Be Only One - 10"
- Empathy with them - it's a mockery - LP
- Stop the war and bring the noiz - 7"
- Za osobne potrebe odjebi - LP
- Bob dylan is dead - 7"
- Mi smo zapušteni dečki - 12"
- Obrade - tribute LP
- Več 15 godina fax se ne završava - promo 7"
- The hammer inside - CD
- Corrosion of humanity - 7"
- Never healed - CD
- Nezadovoljstvo je energija - CD
- Tko ne pamti iznova proživljava - CD
- Debilana sessions - CD

=== Split albums ===
- Patareni / Atta – Deadland massacre 7"
- Patareni / U.B.R. - Back from the dead 7"
- Patareni / Stres D.A. - Made in Balkan 7"
- Patareni / Anal Cunt - Good-bye the legends 7"
- Patareni / T.M.P. - Debilana sessions 7"
- Patareni / Extreme Noise Terror - The split noiz ep 7" (considered bootleg by the members of Extreme Noise Terror)
- Patareni / Debilana - Mi smo djeca debilane 10"
- Patareni / Anal Cunt - I.R.C. or no reply 7"
- Patareni / Cripple Bastards 7"
- Patareni / Agathocles 7"
- Patareni / Crucifix 7"
- Patareni / Cripple Bastards 10"
- Patareni / U.B.R. LP
- Patareni / Starakoka masnajuha - Split porno ep 7"
- Patareni / Burek Death Squat 7"
- Patareni / Buka - Zbukarana Histereza Zbrda Zdola Zamjenjena Mjesta Pribrojnicima Bazične Nedovršene I Nepostojeće Pjesme Svih Tonaliteta U Falšu Basic Rehearsal Songs LP

=== Compilation appearances ===
- 1984 the 3rd double LP
- Step by step 7"
- The return of Yugoslavia LP
- The soon [sic] of bleaurgh 7”
- I kill what i eat CD
- Son Of Bllleeeeaaauuurrrrgghhh! 7”
- Obrade i melioracija tribute CD
- A Tribute To The Patareni CDR
- Reality [sic] Shows Vol. 2 Cass.
- No Fate IV 2xCD
- Blitzkrieg Over You - A Tribute To The Ramones LP
- Tutti-Pazzi CD
- Network of friends-network of loosers [sic] LP
- Un-reality 2xLP, CD
- Revenge of the disabled VHS
- Ni strahu VHS
- Dokument 86 VHS
