= F.R.U.I.T.S. =

F.R.U.I.T.S. are a Moscow-based cult duo comprising Alexei Borisov and Pavel Zhagun. The duo was formed in 1992 to combine different directions of experimental music, such as abstract electronica, noise music, rhythmical, minimalism, micro and macro sounds and waves, and free improvised voices.
