= Rising Dream =

Croatian metal band

- Origin: Zadar, Croatia
- Genres: power metal melodic death metal
- Years active: 2004 - Present
- Labels: Mars Music / Dallas Records
- Members: Tomislav Šanić; Joško Barbir; Goran Paleka; Igor Goić; Filip Letinić
- Website: Official website

Rising Dream is Croatian power metal/melodic death metal band from Zadar.

== History ==
The name Rising Dream has in a short time become a brand in the European metal community when the Croatian scene is talked about. Five years since it was founded, the band became the leader of the scene.

On August 8, 2008 Rising Dream issued their debut album Failed Apocalypse. Their concerts are famous for their intensity and spectacle, and they are able to make tens of thousands of people to frantically support them during their shows. Some of the biggest metal and hard rock bands have asked them to be their special guests. Deep Purple, Motörhead, Soulfly, Slayer, Anthrax, Helloween, HammerFall are just some of the bands Rising Dream have supported during the years. Iron Maiden has hand-picked Rising Dream to be their special guest at the stadium show in Split, Croatia on August 10, 2008, in front of over 20,000 fans. Rising Dream was the only band on the entire Maiden tour that got the chance to play their full 70-minute show.

The debut album's producer Denis Mujadžić Denyken is the most famous and most awarded Croatian rock and metal producer, and Visions of Atlantis and Aesma Daeva singer Melissa Ferlaak appears as a special guest.

Beginning the April 23rd, Rising Dream, together with German thrash metal band Destruction began a special leg of the Destruction world tour D.E.V.O.L.U.T.I.O.N., which is also first leg of their Failed Tour 2009, showcasing their album Failed Apocalypse all around Europe. This leg occupied 12 shows in 8 countries (Switzerland, Italy, Austria, Slovakia, Romania, Bulgaria, Greece and Serbia).

In February 2010 the band announced that female singer Ines Tančeva had joined the band.

== Members ==
- Ines Tančeva – vocals (2010–2013)
- Joško Barbir – guitar (2004–present)
- Ivan Kutija – keyboard (2004–2013)
- Goran Paleka – guitar (2004–present)
- Igor Goić – drums (2004–present)
- Filip Letinić – bass guitar (2007–present)
- Tomislav Šanić – vocals (2013–present)

== Discography ==
- The Rising Madness (Demo / 2004)
- The Spheres (Demo / 2007)
- Failed Apocalypse (Dallas Records, 2008)
