= Sunao Inami =

Japanese electronic musician

Sunao Inami is a Japanese electronic musician and a key figure in the field of wavetable synthesis. After playing in the post-new wave band Controlled Voltage in the early '90s, he built his own Internet servers and started creating improvised electronic music. His 1st album Time Control was released by the Belgian label SubRosa in 1998. In 2000 he participated in the Yellow Magic Orchestra remix project "Technopolis 2000-00". Sunao has toured extensively, performing in Europe, the U.S. and Taiwan with other musicians and dancers, and around Japan. He runs "Cave" Studio, his own label "electr-ohm" and electronica/noise label and shop "C.U.E. Records" in Kobe with "mindscapes" events at Apple Store in Osaka and Nagoya.
