= PureH =

Slovenian electronic music group

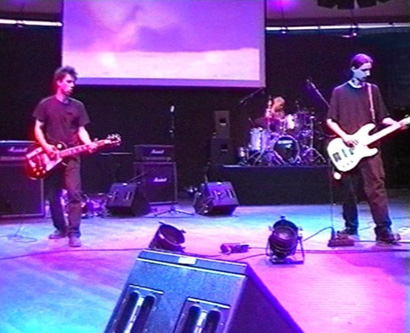

Background information
- Also known as: Pure H Pureh; Pure-H; Glaxprism; Spheres; Inertia; KSVLKSV; XARQ; Puredope
- Origin: Slovenia
- Genres: Electronic; Ambient; Drum and Bass; Industrial; Dub; Experimental
- Years active: 1993–2000, 2005 - present
- Labels: Pharmafabrik
- Website: Official website

PureH is a Slovenian electronic music group formed in 1993, when their first tape Inertia appeared. Before that they were gathering experiences as musicians in several bands (Extreme Smoke, D.T.W., Patareni, etc.) The group initially consisted of a producer and video artist. After performing at the festival Break21, the group was joined by a drummer, guitarist and bass player. PureH have appeared on various compilation CDs, festivals, TV/radio commercials, World exhibition Expo 2000 and have received Bumerang 2000 alternative music award for experimental music. The remix album Signia was released in 2007 with artists KK Null, Eraldo Bernocchi, Surgeon, Psychedelic Desert, Chris Wood, P.C.M. and others. They release their albums for one of the leading alternative record companies in Slovenia.

== Discography ==
=== Albums ===
- 1994: Inertia
- 1996: Chinacat
- 1999: Autistic
- 2005: Anadonia
- 2007: Signia
- 2024: Tetragram

=== Videography ===
- 1999: Short Movies for Videowalls
