= DreamState =

Canadian musical group

DreamSTATE
- Origin: Canada
- Genres: Ambient music
- Years active: 1995-present
- Members: Scott McGregor Moore; Jamie Todd
- Website: www.dreamstate.to

DreamSTATE is a Canadian ambient music project known for their soundscape installations and early live ambient performances in the Toronto, Ontario area. Their soundscapes combine electronic music processes with field recordings and range from light to dark ambient and drone music.

== See also ==
- List of ambient music artists
