= Maeror Tri =

German ambient/noise/drone music band

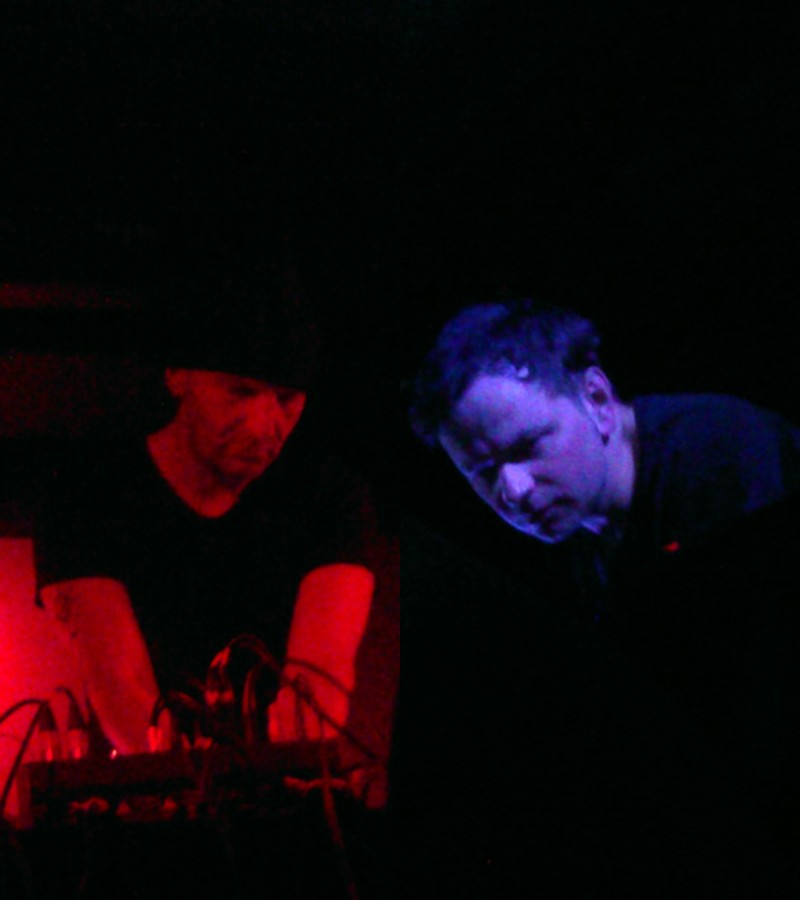
- Helge S. Moune and Stefan Knappe performing as a part of 1000schøen and Troum, respectively.

Background information
- Origin: Germany
- Genres: Drone; Industrial
- Years active: 1988–2000
- Labels: Baracken; Drone; Old Europa Cafe; Ant-Zen; Staalplaat; Soleilmoon
- Spinoffs: Tausendschoen; Troum
- Spinoff of: Screaming Corpses
- Past members: Helge Siehl; Martin Gitschel; Stefan Knappe

Logo of Maeror tri, authored by Helge S. Hammerbrook

Maeror Tri was an ambient, noise and drone music band from Germany founded in the 1980s which consisted of Stefan "Baraka H" Knappe, Martin "GLIT[s]CH" Gitschel and Helge S. Hammerbrook (a.k.a. Helge Siehl).

In a way similar to Zoviet France, they used only live instruments to produce music with an enormous number of effects applied. They disbanded in the late 1990s after releasing a number of limited-edition records. They released music on labels such as Old Europa Cafe, Ant-Zen, Staalplaat, and Soleilmoon.

Stefan and Martin continued under the name of Troum, while Helge is recording as Tausendschoen and as H.S. Hammerbrook. Stefan Knappe is also the founder and owner of Drone Records.

== History ==
German band Maeror Tri was founded in April 1988 by Stefan Knappe and Helge S. Hammerbrook (in early years as Helge as Moune). The group consisted of three members who only used electric guitars and tons of processing devices to create their droning soundscapes. Their music borrowed elements from Industrial, avant-garde, minimalism and New Age meditation to reach a new form of transcendentalism. Very little is known about their origins, even the identity of the band's members remains vague, except for Stefan Knappe, the group's spokesperson and also owner of the label Drone Records. Nevertheless, it is for sure that all three members origin from the city Leer in northern Germany and know each other since their time in school.

The name they chose is probably an incorrect Latin expression that may be better translated as "The Mourning Three" or "The Grieving Three".

"Dedicated To A New Dawn", their first cassette, was self-released on their own Baracken Records in 1988, soon followed by many more cassette works on labels like ZNS, Tonspur and Audiofile, and a lot of compilations appearances.

In 1993 Korm Plastics (a label ran by Frans de Waard) released the very first "overground" Maeror Tri album "Multiple Personality Disorder" a concept CD divided in four long parts recorded back in 1991 that fully showcase their mastery in distorting and layering guitar sounds. It was soon followed by "Meditamentum", a collection of tracks from their first six cassette releases recorded between 1988 and 1993.

"Myein", a work recorded between 1992 and 1993, was released on American label ND in 1995. This work presented three long tracks that well exemplify some of the aspects of their art: the gothic droning of "Phlogiston", the ambient-electronica of "Desiderium", and the 47 minute long title track. The group expanded the themes of "Myein" into a 12-hour live performance at the AVE (Audio Visual Experimental) Festival in Arnhem, The Netherlands, in 1995. Extracts of the recorded performance were later released in 2010 on The A.V.E. - Tapes / Live in Nevers.

"Language of Flames and Sound", released on Italian label Old Europa Cafe in 1996, continued to chronicle the group's evolution into more abstract domains.

In May 1995, the group played the Ultimate Music Festival in Nevers, France, alongside Deutsch Nepal, Edward Ka-Spel, and Tony Wakeford among others. In July 1996, the band played a two-day festival in Cologne Germany alongside artists such as Faust, Thomas Köner, and Atom Heart among others. In September 1996, the group played the Heavy Nursing festival in Ghent, Belgium, which was headlined by Zoviet France.

In late 1996, as the group was about to break into the growing experimental electronica scene, one member of the band, Helge S. Moune, decided to quit, leaving Knappe and his other partner to continue as the duo Troum. "Mort aux Vaches", a symphony in three movements and the group's installment in Staalplaat's series of experimental electronica, and "Emotional Engramm" (on Iris Light), probably their most accessible recording, were both released in 1997 after their dissolution.

Archive material has continued to surface over the years after the group ceased to exist: a second volume of Meditamentum, released on Manifold in 1999, salvaged more material from the early years limited edition cassettes (works from 1989 to 1992), while the "Hypnotikum I" and "Hypnotikum II" LPs are valid examples of the group's live attitude.

Yearning for the Secret of Nature is a "cassette album".

ZNS Tapes, long defunct tape label from Germany, offered a catalogue of all music released by the label during its existence from 1987 to 1993. Some of the offered works include "Ambient Dreams" by Maeror Tri and a compilation called "Non-Nuclear War" to which Maeror Tri contributed track called "Ecstatic Singing".

In 2005, EE Tapes released a CD compendium of all the band's vinyl releases except their first 7", "Saltatrix".

== Musical style ==
Piero Scaruffi wrote in 2003 that Maeror Tri "pioneered music for guitar-drones."

In 1996, Hungarian magazine Második Látás wrote an article analysing the work of Maeror Tri in context of the industrial music. They singled out their albums Yearning for the Secret of Nature and Multiple Personality Disorder as "great example[s] of their musical endeavors" and praising their ability to blend the "occupation of nature with psychic health", reinforcing our mind with "symbolic agitation of reality-infuriated, not merely amusing noises and through them. The magazine additionally highlighted that their compilation work, Meditamentum, "requires intelligent and sensitive attention".

In the same 1996 issue, appeared a review for their work Myein, describing it as a "masterpiece, and one of the highlights and fulfillment of post industrial, or (ITT) ambient-noise". The first composition, "Phlogiston", cascades with several layers of guitar sounds, mixed in way that it "sounds even more blurred than in Branca's works, repetitive pulsations stretched to catharsis". On the second composition, "Desiderium", the noises calm down, and "the long-held notes slowly mature into melodies". Mood-wise, it was characterized as an "irresistible force" pulling towards "the path of self-discovery, [..] even when deep pains await him on this path". The music of Maeror Tri, according Második Látás, provides the "a larger and broader framework, beyond space and time" that can be inhibited by a listener.

== Discography ==
Year	Title	Format	Label	Notes
1988	Dedicated To A New Dawn	MC (C-60)	Baracken Records	Private release
1988	Perception Kills	MC (C-60)	Baracken Records	Private release
1989	Peak Experience	MC (C-60)	Harsh Reality Music	
1990	Peak Experience	MC (C-60)	Bestattunginstitut	Two tracks differ from prior version
1990	Somnia Et Expergisci	MC (C-60)	IRRE Tapes	split with Nostalgie Eternelle
1990	Ambient Dreams	MC (C-60)	ZNS Tapes	
1991	Fragilitas	MC	Drone Records	only private presents were made
1991	Sensuum Mendacia	MC (C-45)	Direction Music	
1991	Subliminal Forces	MC (C-60)	Tonspur Tapes	
1992	Hypnobasia	MC (C-45)	Old Europa Cafe	
1992	Venenum	MC (C-60)	Audiofile Tape	
1992	Timeless Transcension	Video (VHS)		
1993	Multiple Personality Disorder	CD	Korm Plastics	
1993	Saltatrix	7"	Drone Records	
1993	Yearning For The Secret(s) Of Nature	MC (C-77)	Fools Paradise	
1993	Mind Reversal	MC (C-60)	Hithlahabuth	
1993	Archaic States	MC (C-60)	G.R.O.S.S.	
1994	Ultimate Time	MC (C-60)	Old Europa Cafe	
1994	Meditamentum	CD	Holonom HOL01, edition of 500 numbered copies	The only release of this label ran by Robert Osten, later continued as RAUM 312 and now EDITION AURINIA
1995	Physis	7"	Fools Paradise	
1995	Myein	CD	ND 1000	
1995	Mystagogus	7"	Noise Museum	
1995	Ambiguitas	MC (C-60)	Lebensraum/N&B	
1996	Exorbitant	7"	Ant-Zen	
1996	The Beauty Of Sadness	MC (C-70)	Direction Music	
1996	Language Of Flames And Sound	CD	Old Europa Cafe	
1997	Mort Aux Vaches	CD	Staalplaat	
1997	Emotional Engramm	CD	Iris Light	
1998	Pleroma	Pic-10"	Ant-Zen	
1998	Hypnotikum I	LP	Soleilmoon	
1998	Simulationswelten	7"	Rendezvous Radikal	Together with Telepherique
1999	Meditamentum II	CD	Manifold Records	
1999	Venenum	CD-R	Üne	
1999	Hypnotikum II	LP	Poeta Negra/Absurd	
2000	Mind Reversal	CD-R	Blade	
2000	Forazeihan/Broken Books and Wings	Pic-7"	The Disaster Area	Split with Crawl Unit
2001	Yearning For The Secret Of Nature	CD-R	EE Tapes	Reissue
2005	Hypnobasia/Ultimate Time	2CD	Old Europa Cafe	Reissue
2005	Meditamentum	CD	Manifold	Reissue
2005	Myein	CD	Waystyx	Reissue
2005	Peak Experience	CD-R	Blade Records/AFE	Reissue
2005	Sensuum Mendacia	CD-R	L White Records	Reissue
2005	The Beauty Of Sadness	CD	Tantric Harmonies	Reissue
2005	The Singles	CD	EE Tapes	
2010	The A.V.E. - Tapes / Live in Nevers	CD	Zhelezobeton	Live recordings

== Discography - Compilation appearances ==
Year	Track title	Appears on/Compilation name	Format	Label
1989	Wheel	The Final Compilation	MC (C-60)	De Koude Oorlog
1989	The Last Perception	Tape Rebel 9	MC (C-30)	Weed Music
1990	Growing Rotation	Detonator	MC (C-60)	Bestattungsinstitut
1990	Ecstatic Singing	Non-Nuclear War	MC (C-60)	ZNS Tapes
1990	Cursed Colours	A Tender Tension	MC (C-60)	Pharaoh Chronium Sounds
1990	Chirping	Crime On Family Bombed Mother And Son	2MC (C-90)	Black Death
1990	Endless Space	Three Into One Vol. 7	MC (C-60)	Clockwork Tapes
1990	Secret Ways Of A Pyramid	Three Into One Vol. 7	MC (C-60)	Clockwork Tapes
1990	Tranquilizer	Three Into One Vol. 7	MC (C-60)	Clockwork Tapes
1990	This Is Heaven	Three Into One Vol. 7	MC (C-60)	Clockwork Tapes
1990	Participation	Stuhlgangsblockaden	LP	Schimpfluch
1991	Choir Of Transcendence	Devastating Templaric Sounds	MC (C-60)	Biotope Art Organization
1991	The Seven Signals	It's Time	MC (C-60)	Black Death
1991	Tremor	Paradoxical Paralysis	MC (C-60)	Bestattungsinstitut
1991	Arcana	Double-Mind	MC (C-60)	Tears Compilations
1991	From Where Comes This Fear?	Double-Mind	MC (C-60)	Tears Compilations
1991	Ankh	Double-Mind	MC (C-60)	Tears Compilations
1991	Prior	Magnetic Fields	MC (C-60)	SPH
1991	Love In A Vacuum	Magnetic Fields	MC (C-60)	SPH
1991	Omnium	Magnetic Fields	MC (C-60)	SPH
1991	Searcher	Ninians Night Elves	MC (C-90)	Love Is The Reason Why
1991	Ab Inferis	Motop 2	CD	If Records
1992	Amygdalae	A New Kind Of Torment	MC (C-60)	Linea Taktika
1992	Ingenium	Behind Mysterious Gates	MC (C-60)	No Control Torture
1992	Lacus Mortis	Allianz	MC (C-60)	Pallentin
1992	Entropy's Child In A Thoughtful Mood	Keine Einzelgänger	MC (C-90)	Cat-Killer
1992	Exiltas	Neue Muster Vol 8&9	2MC (C-40)	Tonspur
1992	A Storm Of Sparks	Metallverarbeitende Industrie	MC (C-45)	Bestattungsinstitut
1992	Ardor	Behind Mysterious Gates	CD	No Control Torture
1993	Inner Lightning	Nightporters Vol.2	MC	Jeremy Bamber Tapes
1993	Droning Souls	Macrocephalous Compost	Video (VHS)	Old Europa Cafe
1994	The Glowing Of Night	Vexatio Cerebri	MC (C-60)	Contaminated Productions
1994	Philemon	Bad Alchemy #23	MC	tape-magazine
1994	Suavitas	Outbreakers II	CD	Ebu's Music
1994	Ultramundan	Veromon	MC (C-60)	Ant-Zen
1994	Subliminal Conversation	Atmosphere & Empathy	MC (C-60)	Ebu's Music
1994	The Reckoning Space	Notre-Dame Vol.7	MC (C-60)	EE-Tapes
1994	Searcher (Fragment)	Real Underground Vol.1&2	MC (C-90/60)	Progressive Entertainment
1994	Searcher (Fragment)	Auf Abwegen #16	MC	tape-magazine
1994	Spiritual Emanations	Auf Abwegen #16	MC	tape-magazine
1994	The Beginning Of The Unmeasured	Bovine Spongiform Encephalopathy	CD	Fools Paradise
1994	Immersion In Emotion	From The Hills Of Dream	Video/MC	Direction Music
1995	Fragilitas	L'Ordre Et Le Chaos	CD	Actus Dei
1995	Inner Spheres Deceasing	Invisible Domains	CD	Malignant Records
1995	Neophobia	Pathological Resonance	MC (C-60)	Anomalous Records
1996	The Anaesthetise	Slumbermusic	CD	Universal Egg Records
1997	Terraformen 1	Régénération - Dégénérescence	2CD	Cynistrose

== See also ==
- List of ambient music artists
