= A Challenge of Honour =

Dutch music project

- Genre: Neofolk
- Label: We Are Different Records

A Challenge of Honour are a Dutch music project. They create music in the genres of Modern Classical, Industrial, Experimental, Neofolk.

== History ==
The project began in 2000 when original member Johan König approached the record label, Stahlklang Audio, with some new material. The material was then released as limited production. Later König was joined by Peter Savelkoul. König later quit due to personal problems and Savelkoul continued to release material under the project name alone. After the initial release the project was offered a new record deal with a label called Divine Comedy. Recording for "Only Stones Remain" began in 2001. It was at this time when König quit. Savelkoul had decided to keep the project running due to new interest in other labels such as Cold Spring in the UK. Other recordings from 2001 were completed to form the album "Wilhelm Gustloff" that was released by Cold Spring. In 2005 Savelkoul started a new label called Vrihaspati Recordings. This new label became an outlet for the majority of new material by the project. Later in 2008, after a three-year break, the album "No Way Out" was released. The project now featured a new member, Maurice Lahoije, who had played on a previous album "Monuments". In April 2010 the project announced that it will siege all activities on the 30th of that month. The only releases that will be published are the so-called Season Sessions which can only be obtained by a subscription. A new project by Peter saw the light of Day in May 2010 called Lenin.

== Discography ==
- 2001 - Only Stones Remain (Stahlklang Audio / Divine Comedy Records)
- 2001 - The Right Place (Stahlklang Audio)
- 2002 - Wilhelm Gustloff (Stahlklang Audio / Cold Spring)
- 2003 - Monuments (Steinklang Industries / Vrihaspati Recordings)
- 2005 - Seven Samurai (Vrihaspati Recordings / Divine Comedy Records)
- 2008 - No Way Out (Vrihaspati Recordings)
- 2009 - Leonidas (Old Europa Cafe)
- 2010 - Season I ; The Fall Of Kerak (Self-Released)
- 2011 - Finalmente Libre : Season II (Self-Released)
- 2025 - The Devil and His Servants (Fluttering Dragon)
