= Troum =

German musical duos

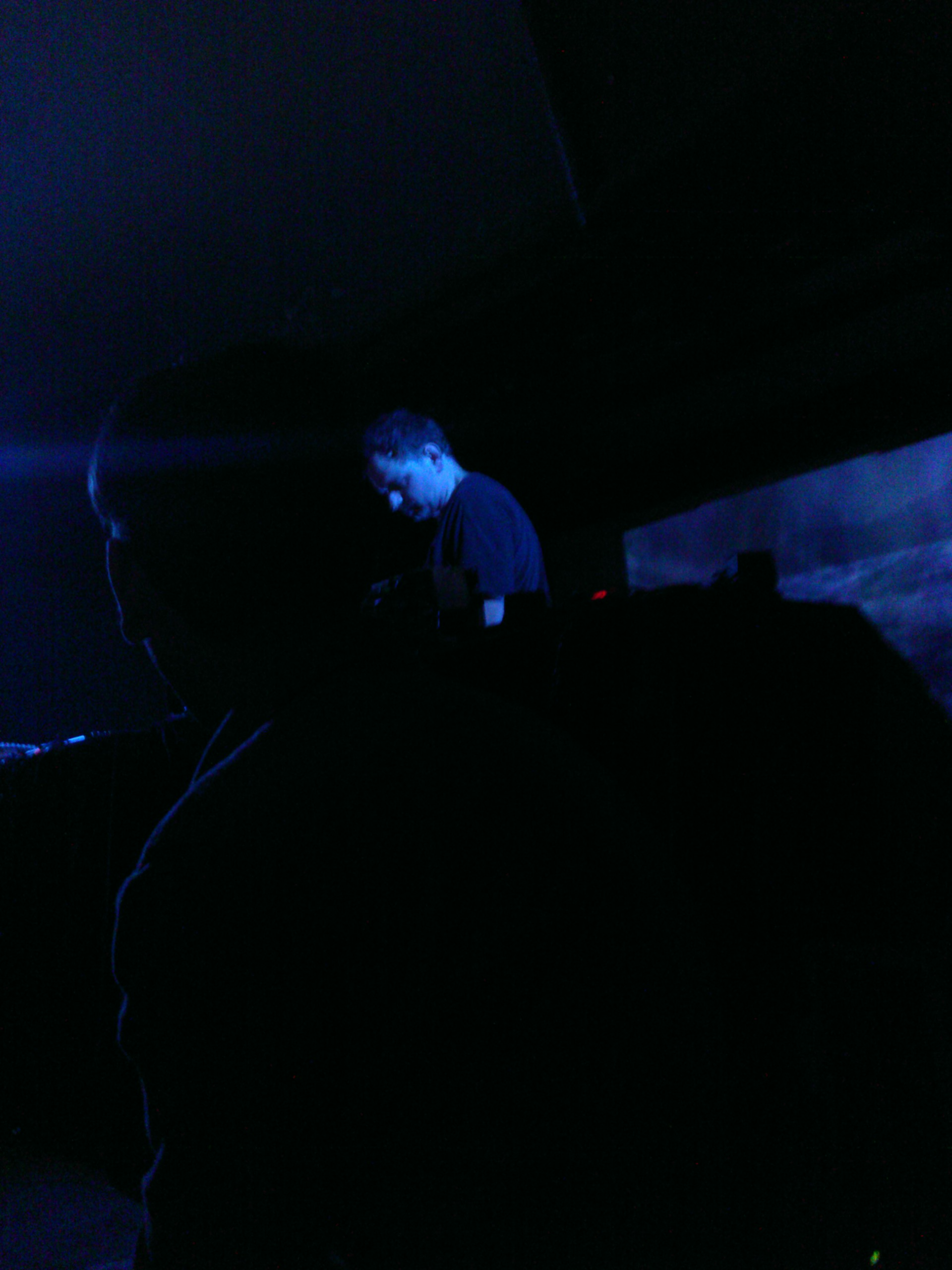
Stefan Knappe in 2014

Troum is a German project of drone music, ambient music, noise music, and experimental music. It was founded in the late 1990s by Stefan Knappe (a.k.a. Baraka[H]) and Martin Gitschel (a.k.a. Glit[S]ch). It is sometimes considered to be the follow-up project to Maeror Tri. Stefan Knappe is also the founder and owner of Drone Records.

== History ==
TROUM is a duo located in Bremen, Germany, established in early 1997. The two members "Glit[S]ch" and "Baraka[H]" were active before in the influential ambient/industrial group MAËROR TRI (which existed from 1988 to 1996). TROUM is the old German word for "DREAM". The dream is seen as a central manifestation of the unconscious, and symbolizes the aim of TROUM to lead the listener into a hypnotizing dream-state of mind, a pre-verbal and primal consciousness sphere. TROUM uses music as the direct path to the Unconscious, pointing to the archaic "essence" of the humans inner psyche. TROUM tries to create music that works like a direct transformation of unconscious matter.

TROUM's creations are influenced by post-industrial, minimal and drone-music. Both members use guitar, bass, voice, accordion, balalaika, flute, mouth-organ, melodica, gong, field recordings, pre-recorded-tapes and a diversity of sound-objects to build a kind of multi-layered and highly atmospheric dreaming-muzak. Their sound could be described as “dark atmospheric ambient industrial”, "transcendental noise" or just “Tiefenmusik”. TROUM doesn't work with samplers or computer-soundsources, the sounds are created "by hand" to reach a broader sensibility. TROUM uses a spiral as their logo, expressing the trance-inducing potential of the music and the wish to reach inner, deeper spheres of the mind with it. Music as a door to unknown & alien dimensions. Music as an expression of the mystery of existence itself.

Highly prolific, Troum has created over 30 full-length album releases and frequently appears on compilation projects and in collaboration with other artists, such as raison d'être.
