= Nordvargr =

Swedish musician

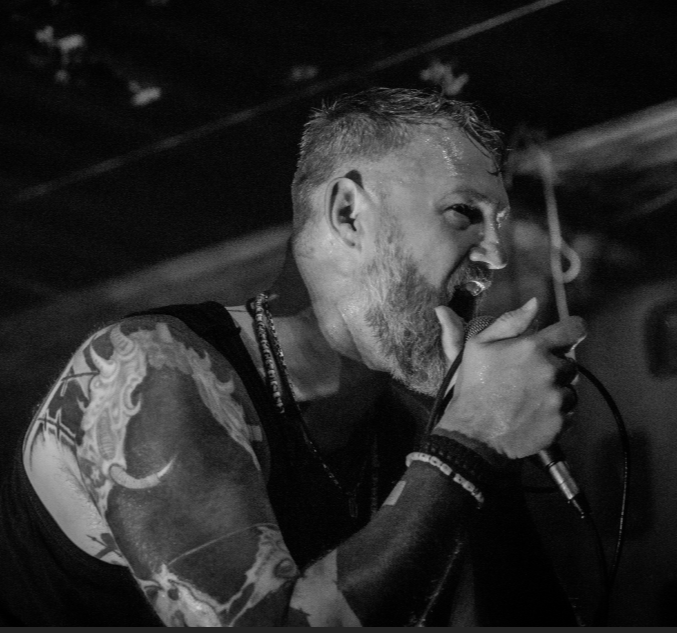

Background information
- Born: Henrik Nordvargr Björkk; 14 November 1971 (age 54)
- Origin: Sweden
- Genres: Industrial, Noise, Black metal, Martial Industrial, Dark ambient
- Occupation: Musician
- Instruments: synthesizers, drum machines
- Years active: 1988–present
- Member of: All Hail The Transcending Ghost; D.I.N.; Econocon; Folkstorm; Goatvargr; Hydra Head 9; Incinerator International; Körperwelten; L/A/B; Lorv; Marvargr; Muskel; Mz.412; Naer Mataron; Nordvargr / Drakh; Pouppée Fabrikk; Thee Maldoror Kollective; Trepaneringsritualen; TOROIDH; Vargr
- Website: www.nordvargr.com

Nordvargr is the most commonly used name for Swedish musician Henrik Nordvargr Björkk.

== Biography ==
=== Early Influence ===
Henrik Nordvargr Björkk was born in Sweden in 1971. His early musical interests were shaped by discovering Kiss. followed by electronic pioneers Kraftwerk and EBM groups such as DAF and Front 242. After acquiring a Roland SH-101 synthesizer in his youth, he began experimenting with electronic sound and noise composition. This led to Björkk and his friends producing what would later be the band Pouppée Fabrikk.

In the late 1980s and early 1990s, Björkk also became involved with the rising Scandinavian industrial and dark ambient scene, releasing early work through the influential Swedish label Cold Meat Industry. His output expanded rapidly across a variety of projects and aliases, establishing him as a central figure in the post-industrial genre.

== Musical Projects ==
=== Pouppée Fabrikk ===
Björkk co-founded Pouppée Fabrikk in 1988. The project is known for a minimal, hard EBM sound influenced by early body music and industrial. Pouppée Fabrikk released albums on labels including Energy Rekords and Alfa Matrix, with Björkk contributing vocals, electronics and production across much of the catalogue.

=== Maschinenzimmer 412 / Mz.412 ===
In 1988 Björkk formed Maschinenzimmer 412 (later shortened to Mz.412) with Jonas Kellgren and Jouni Ollila. The group is often cited as an originator of so-called "black industrial", combining dark ambient textures, metal aesthetics, ritual percussion and noise. The first album, Malfeitor, was released 1989 on the Cold Meat Industry label. This first album was limited to seven hundred copies. . Albums such as In Nomine Dei Nostri Satanas Luciferi Excelsi and Burning the Temple of God became influential within the industrial underground.

=== All Hail The Transcending Ghost ===
In 2009 Nordvargr collaborated with Tim Bertilsson to produce the new project titled All Hail The Transcending Ghost. The album of the same name was released by Cold Spring.

=== Solo work as Nordvargr ===
Under the name Nordvargr, Björkk has released a large body of solo material that spans dark ambient, experimental electronics, drone and ritual industrial. Notable albums include Awaken, Pyrrhula, In Oceans Abandoned by Life I Drown, The Dirt of the World and Metempsychosis, issued through labels such as Cyclic Law, Cold Spring, Essence Music and Old Europa Cafe.

=== Folkstorm ===
Folkstorm is Björkk's harsh power electronics project, active from the late 1990s. Releases such as For the love of hate and Victory or Death are characterised by abrasive noise, distorted vocals and martial rhythmic structures.

=== Toroidh ===
Toroidh has often been described as a conceptual continuation of Folkstorm, focusing on martial industrial and neoclassical elements. Now defunct, Toroidh releases employed themes that referenced war, memory and historical conflict, alongside ambient passages and martial rhythms.

=== Other collaborations ===
Björkk has worked on a wide range of collaborations and side projects, including:

- Anima Nostra with artist Margaux Renaudin
- Vargr an aggressive noise and industrial metal alias
- Collaborative releases and appearances with acts such as Trepaneringsritualen, Arditi and Vanessa Sinclair

== Musical style ==
Critics describe Nordvargr's output as a synthesis of dark ambient, drone, death industrial and martial industrial aesthetics. His style varies between projects:

- As Nordvargr his work tends to focus on brooding atmospheres, ritual electronic textures and deep drones.
- With Mz.412 he is associated with black industrial, combining metal percussion, bleak soundscapes and esoteric themes.
- As Folkstorm he produces harsh power electronics built on overloaded noise and minimal, confrontational structures.
- As Toroidh he explores martial industrial, mixing ambient passages with neoclassical motifs and sampled material.

His projects are often linked to the classic Cold Meat Industry sound yet cover a wider experimental range across post-industrial music.
