= Lull (band) =

Dark ambient project of Mick Harris

Lull is a dark ambient project of former Napalm Death drummer Mick Harris, which he founded in 1990.

== History ==
Mick Harris began the project Lull in 1990, when he acquired a sampler, a reverb pedal and a 4-track recorder. After leaving the grindcore band Napalm Death, Harris wanted to create dark ambient music. Aaron Turner of Isis and Mamiffer described the Lull album Way through Staring as "the first really minimal music I encountered that really captivated me".

== Discography ==
=== Studio albums ===
- 1992 - Dreamt About Dreaming
- 1993 - Journey Through Underworlds
- 1994 - Cold Summer
- 1996 - Continue
- 1997 - Way Through Staring
- 1998 - Moments
- 2001 - Brook (with Origami Arktika)
- 2003 - They're Coming Out of the Walls
- 2008 - Like a Slow River
- 2022 - That Space Somewhere
- 2025 - Tide

=== EPs ===
- 1994 - Chime / Gerbarra
- 1994 - Silenced / Outerbounds
- 1994 - Echoed Currents / Shooting Star Crash
- 1994 - The Passing / Iceberg
- 1995 - Time Box
- 2008 - Circadian Rhythm Disturbance (with Beta Cloud)

=== Compilation Albums ===
- 2003 - Collected (Rare and Unreleased tracks)

== See also ==
- List of ambient music artists
- List of dark ambient artists
