= Mummy and Daddy =

Studio album by Whitehouse
- Released: 7 January 1998
- Genre: Power electronics, noise
- Length: 45:42
- Label: Susan Lawly
- Producer: William Bennett

Whitehouse chronology
Quality Time (1995)	Mummy and Daddy (1998)	Cruise (2001)

Professional ratings
Review scores
Source	Rating
AllMusic	4.5/5 stars
Sputnikmusic	4/5 stars

Mummy and Daddy is the fifteenth studio album by power electronics band Whitehouse, released in early 1998 through Susan Lawly. The album mostly focuses on domestic violence and is considered by many to be one of the band's darkest recordings. The cover art was illustrated by Trevor Brown, who previously worked with the band for their albums Quality Time, Halogen, and Twice Is Not Enough.

== Recording ==
William Bennett considers the album as one of the scariest recordings he has ever made. In the liner notes for the album, he says:

This album is actually quite a worrying one for me. There is a neurosis about some of this work that is genuinely shocking and reaches an intensity that even I could never have dreamt of discovering. There is no explicit sexual content whatsoever – some of the themes cover domestic violence and abuse, subjects that held little interest to me until relatively recently. It will be a sexy record though, in my opinion – but not in the way most people would recognise. In fact, I think a lot of Whitehouse fans may even intensely dislike this album and, by the same token, I don't think we'll acquire many new fans from it. That doesn't really trouble me at all – there is a beauty about music when, on those very rare moments, it takes you to a level where you think it can't get any better. Perfection at a given moment. These feelings mixed with some of this subject matter, however, are deeply disturbing.

The track "Private" compiles various recordings and interviews with victims of domestic violence and child abuse. The track was assembled by Peter Sotos and was recorded and produced by Steve Albini in his Electrical Audio studio.

== Track listing ==
No.	Title	Writer(s)	Length
1.	"Philosophy of the Wife-Beater"	William Bennett, Peter Sotos	5:30
2.	"Worthless"	Bennett, Philip Best, Sotos	1:44
3.	"A Cunt like You"	Bennett	5:58
4.	"Daddo"	Bennett, Sotos	12:17
5.	"Private"	Sotos	20:13

== Personnel ==
- William Bennett – vocals, synthesizers, production
- Peter Sotos – synthesizers, samples
- Philip Best – synthesizers
- Steve Albini – recording, production (on "Private")
- Denis Blackham – mastering
- Satoshi Morita – photography
- G. Scott – photography
- Alan Gifford – design
- Trevor Brown – artwork
