= Quality Time (album) =

Studio album by Whitehouse
- Released: November 1995
- Recorded: at Electrical Audio, Chicago, Illinois, U.S.
- Genre: Power electronics, noise, avant-garde, dark ambient
- Length: 32:49
- Label: Susan Lawly
- Producer: Whitehouse, Steve Albini

Whitehouse chronology
Halogen (1994)	Quality Time (1995)	Mummy and Daddy (1998)

Professional ratings
Review scores
Source	Rating
AllMusic	4/5 stars
Brainwashed	Positive

Quality Time is the fourteenth studio album by power electronics band Whitehouse, released in 1995 through their Susan Lawly label. The cover art was illustrated by Trevor Brown, who made artwork for the band's previous album, Halogen, and their 1991 album, Twice Is Not Enough. The album was reissued on vinyl format in 2009 through Very Friendly.

The track "Baby" is composed solely of samples of baby noises. When Quality Time was uploaded to the music sharing website MP3.com, the track stirred controversy within the website's community, with users calling the band "extremely pretentious" and the track "one of the worst forms of electronic creations [they'd] ever heard".

== Track listing ==
No.	Title	Writer(s)	Length
1.	"Told"	William Bennett, Peter Sotos	4:46
2.	"Quality Time"	Bennett, Sotos	10:01
3.	"Baby"	Bennett	2:58
4.	"Execution"	Philip Best	5:19
5.	"Just Like A Cunt (PB Vocal Version)"	Bennett, Sotos	6:05
6.	"Once And For All"	Bennett, Best, Sotos	3:40

== Personnel ==
- Whitehouse – music, production
- William Bennett - vocals
- Peter Sotos - synthesizer
- Philip Best - synthesizer, vocals
- Steve Albini – recording, production
- Denis Blackham – mastering
- Trevor Brown – artwork
- Akiko Hada – photography
- Mike Reber – photography
- Atholl Drummond – graphic design
