= Right to Kill =

Studio album by Whitehouse
- Released: June 1983
- Genre: Power electronics
- Length: 28:51
- Label: Come Organisation

Whitehouse chronology
Psychopathia Sexualis (1982)	Right to Kill (1983)	Great White Death (1985)

Professional ratings
Review scores
Source	Rating
AllMusic	2/5 stars

Right to Kill is the eighth studio album by the British power electronics band Whitehouse, released in 1983 through Come Organisation. It was released as a special limited edition album, with only approximately 300 copies made on vinyl formats. Because of this, the recording has never been reissued since, for the band feels that it would be of great importance to "preserve its original intent", although numerous bootleg copies of the album have been made.

The record is sometimes known by its full title Right to Kill, Dedicated to Dennis Andrew Nilsen. It was also the band's first release to feature contributions from Kevin Tomkins, who had formed his own power electronics project Sutcliffe Jugend a year previously.

== Track listing ==
All tracks are written by Whitehouse, except where noted.

No.	Title	Writer(s)	Length
1.	"Dedicated to Dennis Andrew Nilsen"		1:15
2.	"Cock Dominant"		1:58
3.	"Tit Pulp"		1:57
4.	"Giles de Rais"		2:14
5.	"Pro-Rapist"		2:15
6.	"Death Penalty"		1:34
7.	"The Streetcleaner"	Peter Sutcliffe	1:33
8.	"Bloodfucking"		2:40
9.	"Queen Myra"		2:19
10.	"New Sadist"		3:38
11.	"Right to Kill"		7:30

== Personnel ==
- William Bennett – vocals, synthesizer
- Philip Best – synthesizer
- Kevin Tomkins – synthesizer
- George Peckham – mastering
- Leslie Jacobs – photography
- Warren Oliver – photography
