= Dedicated to Peter Kürten =

Studio album by Whitehouse
- Released: May 1981
- Recorded: April 1981
- Genre: Power electronics; industrial; experimental; avant-garde
- Length: 24:13
- Label: Come Organisation
- Producer: William Bennett, Peter McKay

Whitehouse chronology
Erector (1981)	Dedicated to Peter Kürten (1981)	Buchenwald (1981)

Professional ratings
Review scores
Source	Rating
AllMusic	4/5 stars

Dedicated to Peter Kürten is the fourth album by Whitehouse released in 1981 by Come Organisation (later reissued by Susan Lawly). The album is also known by its full title, Dedicated to Peter Kürten Sadist and Mass Slayer.

== Overview ==
The album cover features the image of the serial killer Peter Kürten, who has an instrumental track "dedicated" to him on the album. The album also marks the beginning of the themes concerning serial killers. The opening song features a sample of a news man reporting on the capture of Peter Sutcliffe for the "Yorkshire Ripper" killings.

The album includes new versions of the songs, "On Top", "The Second Coming" (both originally from their debut album Birthdeath Experience), and "Her Entry" (from the United Dairies compilation album Hoisting the Black Flag).

Dedicated to Peter Kürten was originally limited to 900 copies on vinyl, with the first edition consisting of 500 copies and the second edition consisting of 400 copies on the group-owned record label, Come Organisation. It was later reissued by the group's second record label, Susan Lawly, on compact disc in 1996.

== Track listing ==
All tracks by William Bennett

1. "Ripper Territory" – 2:19
2. "Prosexist" – 2:03
3. "On Top (New Version)" – 2:04
4. "Pissfun" – 1:58
5. "Rapeday" – 2:03
6. "The Second Coming (New Version)" – 1:54
7. "Her Entry (New Version)" – 2:58
8. "CNA" – 2:51
9. "Dom" – 3:01
10. "Dedicated to Peter Kürten" – 3:02

== Personnel ==
- William Bennett – vocals, synthesizer, production
- Paul Reuter – synthesizer
- Peter McKay – sound effects, production, engineering
- George Peckham – mastering
