= Buchenwald (album) =

- Front cover of the 1996 reissue by Susan Lawly

Studio album by Whitehouse
- Released: September 1981
- Recorded: August 1981
- Genre: Power electronics, industrial
- Length: 24:49
- Label: Come Organisation
- Producer: William Bennett, Peter McKay

Whitehouse chronology
| Dedicated to Peter Kürten (1981) | Buchenwald (1981) | New Britain (1982) |

Professional ratings
Review scores
| Source | Rating |
|---|---|
| AllMusic | 3/5 stars |

Buchenwald is the fifth album by Whitehouse released in 1981 by Come Organisation (later reissued by Susan Lawly).

== Overview ==
As is common in many early Whitehouse recordings, there is a high pitched feedback sound throughout the entire album, except for a brief pause in the title track "Buchenwald". It also uses a distinct, electronic horn-like sound. The track, "Dedicated to Albert de Salvo - Sadist and Mass Slayer" refers to the Boston Strangler, which like the song, "Dedicated to Peter Kürten", from their previous album, is an instrumental track.

Buchenwald was originally limited to 500 copies on vinyl on the group-owned record label Come Organisation. It was later reissued by the group's second record label, Susan Lawly on compact disc in 1996.

== Track listing ==
1. "Buchenwald" – 12:21
2. "Dedicated to Albert de Salvo - Sadist and Mass Slayer" – 4:10
3. "Incest 2" – 4:00
4. "The Days at Florbelle" – 4:18

== Personnel ==
- William Bennett – synthesizers, production
- Peter McKay – production
- Denis Blackham – mastering
- George Peckham – mastering
