= New Britain (album) =

- Cover of the 1996 reissue by Susan Lawly

Studio album by Whitehouse
- Released: March 1982
- Recorded: January 1982 at IPS Studios, London
- Genre: Power electronics, industrial
- Length: 30:21
- Label: Come Organisation
- Producer: William Bennett, Peter McKay, and Dave Kenny

Whitehouse chronology
Buchenwald (1981)	New Britain (1982)	Psychopathia Sexualis (1982)

Professional ratings
Review scores
Source	Rating
AllMusic	3/5 stars

New Britain is the sixth album by Whitehouse released in 1982 by Come Organisation. Much like its title, interior artwork, and lyrical themes suggest, the album mostly deals with the subject of fascism. The album was initially released on vinyl formats, limited to only 500 copies. It was reissued on compact disc in 1996 through Susan Lawly.

== Track listing ==
1. "Movement 1982" – 3:46
2. "Roman Strength" – 3:53
3. "Will to Power" – 3:43
4. "New Britain" – 3:52
5. "Ravensbruck" – 3:56
6. "Kriegserklärung" – 3:56
7. "Viking Section" – 3:56
8. "Active Force" – 3:19

== Personnel ==
- William Bennett – synthesizers, production
- Peter McKay – production
- George Peckham – mastering (original release)
- Denis Blackham – mastering (reissue)
- Atholl Drummond – artwork (reissue)
