= Cruise (Whitehouse album) =

Studio album by Whitehouse
- Released: 16 March 2001
- Recorded: April–December 2000
- Genres: Power electronics, noise
- Length: 44:16
- Label: Susan Lawly
- Producer: William Bennett

Whitehouse chronology
Mummy and Daddy (1998)	Cruise (2001)	Bird Seed (2003)

Cruise is the sixteenth studio album by power electronics band Whitehouse, released in 2001 through the band's Susan Lawly label. The album was reissued on double vinyl format through Very Friendly in 2007, and was the first of a series of limited edition vinyl reissues of the band's catalog.

IDM musician Aphex Twin once played a remixed version of the title track at the 2001 Sónar festival. He has also played the track "Public" during a special "headphone" set at Barbican, London, in which one reviewer of the show called the track "unnecessary, exploitative, and cheap".

== Reception ==
Professional ratings
Review scores
Source	Rating
NME	9/10 stars

== Track listing ==
No.	Title	Writer(s)	Length
1.	"Cruise (Force the Truth)"	Bennett, Sotos, Best	6:48
2.	"Princess Disease"	Bennett	3:21
3.	"Movement 2000"	Bennett	2:58
4.	"Public"	Sotos	13:00
5.	"Scapegoat"	Bennett	4:31
6.	"Dance the Desperate Breath"	Bennett	7:36
7.	"A Cunt Like You"	Bennett	6:02

- Despite appearing on the group's previous album Mummy and Daddy "A Cunt Like You" is featured here completely unchanged as the final track

== Personnel ==
- William Bennett – vocals, synthesizer, production
- Philip Best – vocals, synthesizer
- Peter Sotos – synthesizer, samples (on "Public")
- Denis Blackham – mastering
- Steve Albini – recording (on "Public")
