= Erector (album) =

- Front cover of the 1995 reissue by Susan Lawly

Studio album by Whitehouse
- Released: February 1981
- Recorded: December 1980 – January 1981 at IPS Studio, London
- Genre: Power electronics, noise, avant-garde
- Length: 26:38
- Label: Come Organization
- Producer: William Bennett

Whitehouse chronology
Total Sex (1980)	Erector (1981)	Dedicated to Peter Kürten (1981)

Professional ratings
Review scores
Source	Rating
AllMusic	4.5/5 stars

Erector is the third full-length studio album by power electronics band Whitehouse, released in February 1981 through Come Organization. The record was reissued twice: once in 1995 on CD through Susan Lawly, and again in 2008 on vinyl through Very Friendly.

== Track listing ==
All tracks are written by Whitehouse

Side One
No.	Title	Length
1.	"Erector"	7:08
2.	"Shitfun"	6:09

Side Two
No.	Title	Length
3.	"Socratisation Day"	7:05
4.	"Avisodomy"	6:16

== Personnel ==
- William Bennett – vocals, synthesizers
- Paul Reuter – synthesizer
- Peter McKay – synthesizer
- George Peckham – mastering (original release)
- Denis Blackham – mastering (reissue)
- Steven Stapleton – artwork (vinyl edition)
- Athol Drummond – artwork (CD edition)
