= Great White Death (album) =

Studio album by Whitehouse
- Released: February 1985
- Recorded: November–December 1984 at IPS Studio, London
- Genre: Power electronics, noise, avant-garde
- Length: 27:51
- Label: Come Organization
- Producer: William Bennett, Dave Kenny

Whitehouse chronology
| Right to Kill (1983) | Great White Death (1985) | Thank Your Lucky Stars (1990) |

Alternate cover
- Special Edition cover

Professional ratings
Review scores
| Source | Rating |
|---|---|
| AllMusic | 4/5 stars |

Great White Death is the ninth studio album by power electronics band Whitehouse, released in February 1985. It was the last Whitehouse record to be released through Come Organization, a label which dissolved after the band went on hiatus after the record's release. The album was reissued on CD format in 1991 through the band's new label, Susan Lawly. A special edition was issued in 1997 which came with a bonus track, an extended version of the song "My Cock Is On Fire". In 2010, a vinyl reissue of the album was released through Very Friendly.

== Track listing ==
| No. | Title | Writer(s) | Length |
|---|---|---|---|
| 1. | "Great White Death" | W. Bennett | 2:27 |
| 2. | "Ass Destroyer" | P. Sotos, K. Tomkins, W. Bennett | 3:14 |
| 3. | "You Don't Have To Say Please" | W. Bennett | 8:28 |
| 4. | "Rapemaster" | W. Bennett, K. Tomkins | 3:19 |
| 5. | "I'm Coming Up Your Ass" | W. Bennett | 7:12 |
| 6. | "We've Got The Power" | W. Bennett | 2:57 |

Special Edition CD bonus track
| No. | Title | Writer(s) | Length |
|---|---|---|---|
| 7. | "My Cock Is On Fire (Extended Version)" | W. Bennett | 13:36 |
| Total length: | | | 41:27 |

== Personnel ==
- William Bennett – vocals, synthesizers, production, design
- Dave Kenny – production
- George Peckham – mastering
- Denis Blackham – mastering (Special Edition CD)
- Alan Gifford – graphic design (Special Edition CD)
- Hayley – photography (Special Edition CD)

== Release history ==
| Region | Date | Label | Format | Catalog |
|---|---|---|---|---|
| United Kingdom | February 1985 | Come Organisation | LP | WDC 881069 |
| United Kingdom | April 1991 | Susan Lawly | CD | SLCD002 |
| United Kingdom | 1997 | Susan Lawly | CD | SLCD017 |
| United Kingdom | 14 April 2010 | Very Friendly | LP | VFSL07 |
