= Come =

Come may refer to:

== Places ==
- Come, village of a Greek polis
- Comè, a city and commune in Benin
- Come (Tenos), an ancient town on Tenos island, Greece

== Music ==
- Come (American band), an American indie rock band formed in 1990
- Come (UK band), a British noise project founded in 1979
  - Come Organisation, its record label
- Come (album), a 1994 album by Prince
- "Come" (Fleetwood Mac song), 2003
- "Come" (Jain song), 2015
- "Come" (Jenny Berggren song), 2015

== Other ==
- COMe, COM Express, a single-board computer type
- A possible outcome which may be bet on in craps, whence the general gambling expression

== See also ==
- Cum (disambiguation)
- Saint-Côme (disambiguation)
- Kum (disambiguation)
- Kome (disambiguation)
