= Halogen (album) =

Halogen CD

Studio album by Whitehouse
- Released: April 1994
- Recorded: December 1993 at Electrical Audio, Chicago USA
- Genre: Power electronics, noise
- Length: 29:50
- Label: Susan Lawly
- Producer: Whitehouse, Steve Albini

Whitehouse chronology
Never Forget Death (1992)	Halogen CD (1994)	Quality Time (1995)

Professional ratings
Review scores
Source	Rating
AllMusic	3/5 stars
Brainwashed	positive

Halogen CD is the thirteenth studio album by power electronics band Whitehouse, released in April 1994 through their Susan Lawly label. The album's cover was made by artist Trevor Brown, who previously collaborated with the band on their 1991 album Twice Is Not Enough.

== Track listing ==
All tracks are written by William Bennett, except where noted.

No.	Title	Writer(s)	Length
1.	"Vulgar"		3:49
2.	"Lightning Struck My Dick"	Bennett, Peter Sotos, Jim Goodall	5:40
3.	"Movement 1994"		3:32
4.	"Dictator"		4:03
5.	"Halogen"	Bennett, Sotos	11:51
6.	"The Way It Will Be"		0:55

== Personnel ==
- William Bennett – vocals, synthesizers, production
- Peter Sotos – lyrics
- Steve Albini – recording, production
- Trevor Brown – artwork
- Akiko Hada – photography
- Denis Blackham – mastering
