= Cut Hands =

British experimental noise project

- Origin: United Kingdom
- Genres: Electronic music, experimental music, new-age music
- Years active: 2008-present
- Labels: Susan Lawly, Very Friendly, Blackest Ever Black, Dirtier Promotions
- Members: William Bennett

Cut Hands is a British electronic music project of William Bennett, formerly of the power electronics band Whitehouse. Cut Hands began in 2008, and its music is heavily inspired by African and Haitian Vodou music, characterized by its rhythmic and percussion-based style.

== Early history ==
The project began when William Bennett was invited to DJ at Optimo, a large club in Glasgow. When he asked what they wanted him to play, they told him he could play whatever he wanted. At the time, he was very interested in the music of African culture, and thus he played ritual drumming music, mixed in with Haitian Vodou music. The name "Cut Hands" is a reference to the Whitehouse song "Cut Hands Has the Solution", which was from their 2003 album Bird Seed.

Bennett's work as Cut Hands has brought him considerable attention in mainstream media, being placed in documentaries such as VICE's Kings of Cannabis and having songs like "Black Mamba" sampled in hip-hop such as Danny Brown's "Pneumonia".

== Discography ==
=== Studio albums ===
- Afro Noise I (Volume 1) (2011, Very Friendly)
- Afro Noise I (Volume 2) (2011, Very Friendly)
- Black Mamba (2012, Very Friendly)
- Festival Of The Dead (2014, Blackest Ever Black)
- Afro Noise I (Volume 3) (2014, Dirter Promotions)
- Afro Noise I (Volume 4) (2014, Dirter Promotions)
- Sixteen Ways Out (2022, Susan Lawly)

=== EPs ===
- Afro Noise I (2011, Artencio/Susan Lawly)

=== Singles ===
- "Black Mamba" 12" (2012, Blackest Ever Black)
- "Damballah" 12" (2013, Blackest Ever Black)
- "Madwomen" 12" (2013, Downwards)
