= Asceticists 2006 =

Studio album by Whitehouse
- Released: 14 February 2006
- Recorded: Late 2005
- Genres: Power electronics, noise
- Length: 28:46
- Label: Susan Lawly
- Producer: William Bennett

Whitehouse chronology
Bird Seed (2003)	Asceticists 2006 (2006)	Racket (2007)

Professional ratings
Review scores
Source	Rating
Pitchfork	7.6/10
Tiny Mix Tapes	4.5/5 stars

Asceticists 2006 is the eighteenth studio album by power electronics group Whitehouse, released in 2006 through Susan Lawly. It was reissued on vinyl format through Very Friendly in October 2008.

== Track listing ==
No.	Title	Writer(s)	Length
1.	"Dans"	Best, Bennett	4:40
2.	"Language Recovery"	Best, Bennett	4:50
3.	"Guru"	Bennett	5:32
4.	"Nzambi Ia Lufua"	Bennett	2:37
5.	"Killing Hurts Gives You the Secrets"	Best, Bennett	5:32
6.	"Ruthless Babysitting"	Best, Bennett	3:12
7.	"Dump the Fucking Rubbish"	Bennett	2:22

== Personnel ==
- William Bennett – vocals, synthesizers, production
- Philip Best – vocals, synthesizers
- Denis Blackham – mastering
