= Racket (album) =

Studio album by Whitehouse
- Released: 31 May 2007
- Recorded: 2006–2007
- Genre: Power electronics, noise
- Length: 29:43
- Label: Susan Lawly
- Producer: William Bennett

Whitehouse chronology
Asceticists 2006 (2006)	Racket (2007)

Professional ratings
Review scores
Source	Rating
Brainwashed	mixed

Racket is the nineteenth and final studio album by power electronics band Whitehouse, released on 31 May 2007 through the Susan Lawly label. The album was originally supposed to come out on 13 March of that year, but due to issues with recording, the album's release date was set back by a couple of weeks. Instruments used in the album were synthesizers, the djembe, doundouns, and ksings.

The album artwork was done by Stefan Danielsson, a Swedish artist who specializes in collages with African and Haitian influences.

== Track listing ==
All tracks are written by William Bennett, except where noted

No.	Title	Writer(s)	Length
1.	"Fairground Muscle Twitcher"		2:31
2.	"Mouthy Battery Beast"	William Bennett, Philip Best	5:57
3.	"Dumping More Fucking Rubbish"		3:23
4.	"The Avalanche"		4:15
5.	"Bahnhof"	Bennett, Best	1:53
6.	"Dyad"		4:51
7.	"Bia Mintatu"		6:53

== Personnel ==
- William Bennett – vocals, instruments, production, "animal response technician"
- Philip Best – vocals, instruments, "dirty word specialist"
- Stefan Daneilsson – artwork
- Denis Blackham – mastering
