= Birthdeath Experience =

Studio album by Whitehouse
- Released: 1980
- Recorded: 1980 at IPS Studio, London
- Genre: Power electronics; noise
- Length: 33:02 (29:33)
- Label: Come Organization (1980); Susan Lawly (1993); Very Friendly (2007)
- Producer: William Bennett

Whitehouse chronology
Birthdeath Experience (1980)	Total Sex (1980)

Professional ratings
Review scores
Source	Rating
AllMusic	3/5 stars

Birthdeath Experience is the debut studio album by power electronics band Whitehouse. It was originally released in 1980 through Come Organization. It was released on CD in May 1993 through Susan Lawly, then reissued in 2007 on vinyl through Very Friendly. The original edition was limited to 1,250 copies on vinyl format; 850 with pink/white labels, 400 with Spanish text on the labels.

== Track listing ==
All tracks are written by William Bennett

Side One
No.	Title	Length
1.	"On Top"	6:06
2.	"Mindphaser"	6:06
3.	"Rock and Roll"	6:06

Side Two
No.	Title	Length
4.	"The Second Coming"	6:06
5.	"Coitus"	5:09
6.	"Birthdeath Experience"	3:29

Note: track 6 is silent

== Personnel ==
- William Bennett – vocals, synthesizers
- Paul Reuter – synthesizers
- Peter McKay – engineering
- Gordon Hope – mastering (1980 version)
- George Peckham – mastering (1993 reissue)
