= Kum =

Kum or KUM may refer to:

== Geography ==
- Kum (mountain), a mountain in Slovenia
- Geum River (a.k.a. Kum), a river in South Korea

=== West Asia ===
- Kum, Mazandaran, Iran
- Kum, West Azerbaijan, Iran
- Qom, a city in Iran
- Qom province, Iran, whose seat is Qom
- Qum, Azerbaijan

== Culture ==
- Kum (godfather), a Slavic form of a godfather or a groomsman, similar to a blood brother
- Kum., an abbreviation of the Indian honorific Kumari, used for unmarried women
- Guqin (a.k.a. Kum or Qin), a Cantonese musical instrument (琴)

== People ==
- Kum, Cantonese form of Qin (surname) (琴) and Jin (Chinese surname) (金)
- Christian Kum, Dutch footballer
- Kumkum (actress) (a.k.a. Kum Kum), Bollywood actress of 1950s–1970s
- Jan Koum; native birth surname Ukrainian: Кум is typically transliterated as "Kum"

== Other uses ==
- Kum-Kum, an anime
- Yakushima Airport, whose IATA airport code is "KUM"
- Kumyk language (ISO code kum), a Turkic language spoken by the Kumyks

== See also ==
- Keum (disambiguation)
- Kym (disambiguation)
- Kum & Go
- Cum (disambiguation)
- Come (disambiguation)
