= Total Sex =

- Front cover of the 2008 reissue by Very Friendly Records

Studio album by Whitehouse
- Released: November 1980
- Recorded: August 1980 at IPS Studio, London
- Genre: Power electronics, noise
- Length: 32:20
- Label: Come Organization
- Producer: William Bennett

Whitehouse chronology
| Birthdeath Experience (1980) | Total Sex (1980) | Erector (1981) |

Professional ratings
Review scores
| Source | Rating |
|---|---|
| AllMusic | 3/5 stars |

Total Sex is the second full-length studio album by power electronics band Whitehouse, which was released in November 1980 through Come Organisation, only a few months after the band's debut, Birthdeath Experience. The album was reissued twice, first on CD in 1994 through Susan Lawly, and again in 2008 on double vinyl format through Very Friendly. The original release was limited to 1,200 copies on vinyl, the first pressing consisted of 800 copies, the second consisted of 400 copies on translucent green vinyl.

Both reissue versions of the album came with two bonus tracks: "Her Entry" and "Foreplay", both of which originated from the Hoisting the Black Flag compilation.

== Track listing ==
All tracks are written by Whitehouse

Side One
| No. | Title | Length |
|---|---|---|
| 1. | "Total Sex" | 6:05 |
| 2. | "Phaseday" | 6:03 |
| 3. | "Dominate You" | 6:03 |

Side Two
| No. | Title | Length |
|---|---|---|
| 4. | "Politics" | 1:55 |
| 5. | "Roller Coaster" | 6:08 |
| 6. | "Ultrasadism" | 6:06 |

Reissue bonus tracks
| No. | Title | Length |
|---|---|---|
| 7. | "Her Entry" | 6:06 |
| 8. | "Foreplay" | 6:07 |
| Total length: | | 44:33 |

Note: Track 4 is approximately ten seconds of feedback with the remaining time being silent

== Personnel ==
- William Bennett – vocals, synthesizers
- Paul Reuter – synthesizers
- Peter McKay – engineering
- George Peckham – mastering
