= Be Careful What You Wish For (Ramleh album) =

Studio album by Ramleh
- Released: 20 November 1995
- Genre: Noise rock, experimental rock, psychedelic rock
- Length: 73:24
- Label: Sympathy for the Record Industry

Ramleh chronology
| Adieu, All You Judges (1995) | Be Careful What You Wish For (1995) | Works III (1996) |

Be Careful What You Wish For is the ninth studio album by British experimental music group Ramleh. It was released on 20 November 1995 through American independent record label Sympathy for the Record Industry.

Akin to their other releases in 1990s, Be Careful What You Wish For experiments with traditional rock music structures, in contrast to their early 1980s recordings in power electronics genre. It is a concept album and is widely regarded as the band's "highest-profile release."

== Critical reception ==
Professional ratings
Review scores
| Source | Rating |
|---|---|
| AllMusic | 4.5/5 stars |

Stewart Mason of AllMusic described the album as "a remarkable slice of abstract drones by guitarist Gary Mundy, occasionally colored by Philip Best's barely audible, mantra-like vocals and Stuart Dennison's extremely minimal (often beat-free) drumming." He also stated that "Those who think Nine Inch Nails are the ultimate sonic terrorists will be scared silly." Everett Jang Perdue of Trouser Press criticized the album for "leaning too hard in a rock direction" and described it as "the band's blandest."

== Track listing ==
1. "The New York Conning Tower" - 7:17
2. "Chicago Balloon Riders" - 9:00
3. "Boston Concept" - 5:46
4. "Philadelphia Mountain Lion" - 1:45
5. "Seattle Nun Trailer" - 7:51
6. "Buffalo Comeback" - 7:03
7. "Alice in the Cities" - 7:49
8. "Ohio Impromptu" - 4:12
9. "Houston Water Angel" - 10:20
10. "Maryland Sheriff Factory" - 3:16
11. "Michigan Showgirl" - 6:17
12. "Blues for Herb Mullin" - 2:48

== Personnel ==
Ramleh

- Gary Mundy – guitar, electronics
- Philip Best – vocals, electronics
- Anthony di Franco – bass
- Stuart Dennison – drums, percussion
