= Thank Your Lucky Stars (Whitehouse album) =

Studio album by Whitehouse
- Released: July 1990
- Recorded: September 1988 at Electrical Audio
- Genre: Power electronics, noise, avant-garde
- Length: 21:45
- Label: Susan Lawly
- Producer: William Bennett, Steve Albini

Whitehouse chronology
Great White Death (1985)	Thank Your Lucky Stars (1990)	Twice Is Not Enough (1992)

Alternate cover
- Special Edition cover

Professional ratings
Review scores
Source	Rating
AllMusic	4/5 stars

Thank Your Lucky Stars is the tenth studio album by power electronics band Whitehouse, released in 1990 through the newly formed Susan Lawly label. Recorded in September 1988, it was the group's first studio album after a period of inactivity during the later half of the 1980s and the first to feature contributions from writer and musician Peter Sotos and production work from Steve Albini. A special edition was issued in 1997 on CD format that contained bonus tracks previously released on other Whitehouse albums and singles.

== Production ==
Albini said that each song on the album was influenced by a different heavy metal song.

== Track listing ==
No.	Title	Writer(s)	Length
1.	"Hungry for Pain"	W. Bennett, P. Sotos	6:43
2.	"Thank Your Lucky Stars"	D. Tibet, W. Bennett	5:28
3.	"Try and Be Grateful"	P. Sotos, W. Bennett	4:47
4.	"My Cock's on Fire"	W. Bennett	4:29

Special Edition CD bonus tracks
No.	Title	Writer(s)	Originated from	Length
5.	"Neronia"	S. Albini	Twice Is Not Enough	5:15
6.	"Sadist"	K. Tomkins	Thank Your Lucky Stars 7" single	6:10
7.	"Still Going Strong"	P. Sotos	Still Going Strong/Ankles And Wrists 7" single	4:00
Total length:				37:10

== Personnel ==
- William Bennett – vocals, synthesizers, production
- Kevin Tomkins – lyrics, photography
- Peter Sotos – synthesizers, lyrics
- Steve Albini – recording, production
- Hayley – photography
- Leslie Jacobs – photography
- Denis Blackham – mastering
