= Bird Seed (album) =

Studio album by Whitehouse
- Released: 13 February 2003
- Recorded: 2001–2002
- Genres: Power electronics, noise
- Length: 42:46
- Label: Susan Lawly
- Producer: William Bennett

Whitehouse chronology
Cruise (2001)	Bird Seed (2003)	Asceticists 2006 (2006)

Professional ratings
Review scores
Source	Rating
Brainwashed	very positive
Stylus Magazine	C

Bird Seed is the seventeenth album by power electronics group Whitehouse released in 2003 by their own record label, Susan Lawly. It was given an "honourable mention" in the digital musics category of Austria's annual Prix Ars Electronica awards. It was reissued on double vinyl through Very Friendly in July 2009. The title track was recorded by Steve Albini and written by Peter Sotos.

== Track listing ==
All songs written by William Bennett, except for "Bird Seed", written by Peter Sotos

No.	Title	Length
1.	"Why You Never Became a Dancer"	2:50
2.	"Wriggle Like a Fucking Eel"	4:43
3.	"Philosophy"	9:17
4.	"Bird Seed"	14:39
5.	"Cut Hands Has the Solution"	6:12
6.	"Munkisi Munkondi"	5:02

== Personnel ==
- William Bennett – vocals, synthesizer, computer, lyrics, graphic design, production
- Philip Best – vocals, synthesizer
- Peter Sotos – samples (on "Bird Seed")
- Alan Gifford – graphic design
- Denis Blackham – mastering
