= Cerceau =

Cerceau may refer to:

- Aerial hoop, a suspended circular steel apparatus on which circus artists perform aerial acrobatics
- Saint-Pierre Doré, a white French wine grape variety
