= Kome =

Kome may refer to:

- KOME, a defunct radio station in San Jose, California
- Kome (Tenos), an ancient city on the island of Tenos, Greece
- Kome Hyappyo, a Japanese term
- Kōme Station, a train station in Okayama Prefecture, Japan
- Kome Rural LLG, Papua New Guinea
- Kome, a village of a Greek polis

== People ==
- Daniel N'Gom Kome (born 1980), Cameroonian footballer
- Penney Kome, Canadian journalist and magazine editor

== Chemistry ==
- KOMe chemical formula for potassium methoxide

== See also ==
- Come (disambiguation)
