= Maurizio Bianchi =

Italian musician

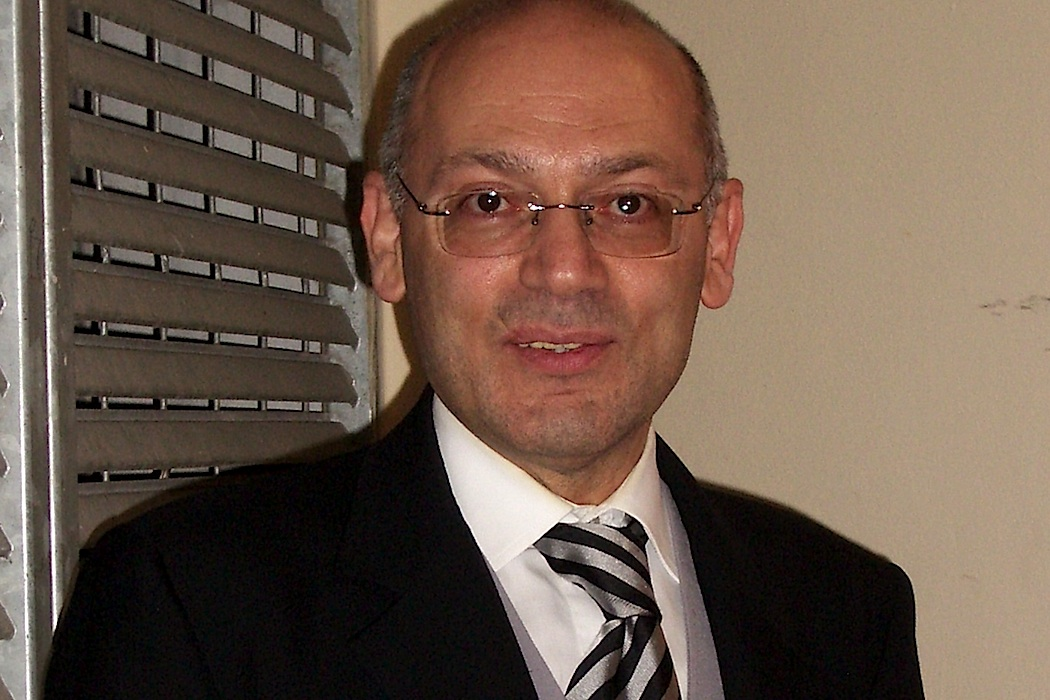
Bianchi in 2017

Maurizio Bianchi (born 4 December 1955 in Pomponesco in the Province of Mantua) is an Italian pioneer of industrial music, originating from Milan.

== Biography ==
=== 1979–1983 ===
Bianchi was inspired by the music of Tangerine Dream, Conrad Schnitzler and Throbbing Gristle. He wrote about music for Italian magazines before beginning to release his own cassettes under the name of Sacher-Pelz in August 1979. He released four cassettes as Sacher-Pelz before switching to his own name or simply "MB" in 1980.

Bianchi corresponded with many of the key players in the industrial music and noise music scenes including Merzbow, GX Jupitter-Larsen, SPK, Nigel Ayers of Nocturnal Emissions and William Bennett of Whitehouse. After this exchange of letters and music, his first LPs were released in 1981.

Symphony For A Genocide was released on Nigel Ayers' Sterile Records label after Bianchi had sent Ayers the money to press it. Each track on the LP was named after a Nazi extermination camp. The cover featured photographs of the Auschwitz Orchestra, a group of concentration camp prisoners who were forced to play classical music as people were herded into the gas chambers. The back cover included the text "The moral of this work: the past punishment is the inevitable blindness of the present".

Also in 1981, William Bennett, head of the band Whitehouse and the British Come Org. label, offered Bianchi a record contract, which Bianchi signed unchecked. The contract assumed all rights to Bianchi's work. After delivery of the tapes, Bennett edited in speeches by Nazi leaders, and instead of the relatively unsensational name MB, it was published under the alias Leibstandarte SS MB, named after the SS unit that worked as bodyguards to Adolf Hitler.

By 1983 and the release of the Plain Truth LP on U.K. power electronics label Broken Flag, Bianchi had become a Jehovah's Witness. At the end of 1983 Bianchi announced his withdrawal from music, stating "The end is very near, and we have a very short time to recognise our mistakes and to redeem ourselves... I stopped doing music, and now my life is going towards its full awareness".

=== 1998–2009 ===
In 1998, encouraged by Alga Marghen label head Emanuele Carcano, who offered him a label of his own, Maurizio Bianchi resumed making music. The label was EEs'T Records, through which he released new editions of old MB albums and many new recordings.

Bianchi then proceeded to work on over a hundred new projects both solo or in collaboration with other Italian and international artists including Atrax Morgue, Aube, Francisco López, Mauthausen Orchestra, Merzbow, Ryan Martin and Philip Julian/Cheapmachines.

Bianchi has worked with record labels including Dais Records, the Carrboro, North Carolina–based Hot Releases and the Italian Menstrual Recordings to re-release some of his out-of-print material.

On August 19, 2009, for unspecified personal reasons, Maurizio Bianchi decided again to completely stop making music. This decision was soon after reversed; Maurizio Bianchi continued to release new music.

== Sample ==
In 2005, a 2-CD set named Blut und Nebel was released, consisting of a remix of his first ten LPs. Bianchi submitted the set's first CD, remixing the first 5 LPs from 1981 and 1982, to Wikipedia. The track, over 45 minutes long, is split into three .ogg files:

- "Blut Und Nebel", CD 1, Pt. 1
- "Blut Und Nebel", CD 1, Pt. 2
- "Blut Und Nebel", CD 1, Pt. 3

== Discography ==
Sacher-Pelz

- "Cainus", Tape C-60, 1979
- "Venus", Tape C-60, 1979
- "Cease to Exist", Tape C-60, 1979/1980
- "Velours", Tape C-60, 1980
- "Mutation For A Continuity", 4CD, 2001, Marquis Records
- "Clerzphase", CD-R, 2006, Stridulum Recordings
- "In Hoc Urbia Miazi", CD, 2007, Old Europa Cafe
- "Hibakusha", CD-R, 2009, CPS, with Amun Cell

MB / Maurizio Bianchi first phase

Cassettes

- "Mectpyo Blut", Tape, 1980, Mectpyo Sounds
- "Gene P", Tape, 1980, self-released
- "Atomique Tape", Tape, 1980, self-released
- "Cold Tape", Tape, 1980, YHR
- "Voyeur Tape", Tape, 1980, YHR
- "Industrial Tape", Tape, 1980, self-released
- "NH/HN", Tape, 1980, self-released
- "I.B.M.", Tape, 1980
- "Computers S.p.A.", Tape, 1980, self-released
- "Com. SA", Tape, 1980, Mectpyo Sounds
- "Dicembre 1980", Tape, self-released
- "Technology", Tape, 1981, Mectpyo Sounds (also as Doubletape "Technology I + II")
- "Nervo/Hydra", Tape, 1981, self-released
- "S.F.A.G. 81", Tape, 1983, Broken Flag

Vinyl albums

- "Symphony For A Genocide", LP, 1981, Sterile Records
- "Menses", LP, 1982, Mectpyo Sounds
- "Neuro Habitat / Mörder Unter Uns", LP, 1982, Mectpyo Sounds
- "Regel", LP, 1982, Mectpyo Sounds
- "Mectpyo Bakterium", LP, 1982, DYS
- "Das Testament", LP, 1983, Mectpyo Sounds
- "Endometrio", LP, 1983, Mectpyo Sounds
- "Carcinosi", LP, 1983, Mectpyo Sounds
- "[Aktivitat]", LP, 1983, Tegal Records
- "The Plain Truth", LP, 1983, Broken Flag
- "Armaghedon", LP, 1984, Mectpyo Sounds
- "Industrial Murder / Menstrual Bleeding", LP, 1992, Banned Production

Leibstandarte SS MB

As his releases on Come Org have been massively manipulated, Maurizio Bianchi does not count these records as part of his discography. However, in 2013 Triumph of the Will and Weltanschauung were re-issued with bonus tracks as separate CDs and as part of the Teban Slide Art box set, which also contained the unofficial release Lebensraum, all under the name "M.B."

- "Triumph Of The Will", LP, 1981, Come Org
- "Weltanschauung", LP, 1982, Come Org

MB / Maurizio Bianchi second phase

- "Colori", CD, 1998, EEs'T Records
- "First Day Last Day", CD, 1999, EEs'T Records
- "Dates", CD, 2001, EEs'T Records
- "Frammenti", CD, 2002, EEs'T Records
- "Antarctic Mosaic", CD, 2003, EEs'T Records
- "Maurizio Bianchi Plays The Clockwork Orange", LP, 2003, Marquis Records
- "Cycles", CD, 2004, EEs'T Records
- "A M. B. Iehn Tale", CD, 2005, Small Voices
- "Mind Us Trial", 2CD, 2005, EEs'T Records
- "M. I. Nheem Alysm", CD, 2005, Silentes
- "Dead Colours", CD, 2005, Silentes
- "Niddah Emmhna", CD, 2005, Silentes
- "Mokushi XVI, XVI", MP3, 2006, Mirakelmusik
- "Blut Und Nebel", CD, 2006, Slaughter Productions
- "The Testamentary Corridor", CD, 2006, Silentes
- "603...Annus Mundi", MP3, 2006, Sinewaves
- "Men's True Hated", CD, 2006, Menstrualrecordings
- "Carcimetrio", CD-R, 2006, Simple Logic
- "Escape to Bela-Zoar", CD, 2006, L. White
- "R. C. E.", CD-R, 2006, Simple Logic
- "Genocidio 20", CD-R, 2006, w.m.o/r
- "The Testamentary Corridor", CD, 2006, Silentes
- "Konkrete Klaenge", MP3, 2006, Radical Matters
- "Elisionem", CD, 2006, Klanggalerie
- "Nevrobatterio", CD-R, 2006, Authorised Version
- "Muitnelis", CD-R, 2007, Tibprod
- "The Industrious Tubal-Cain", CD-R, 2007, Shasha
- "Das Platinzeitalter", CD, 2007, Incunabulum
- "Menstruum Regles", CD, 2007, Silentes
- "Aybasi", compact cassette, 2007, Young Girls Records
- "The Self-portrait of M. B.", CD, 2007, Silentes
- "Avaddohn", CD-R, 2007, Transmit
- "Zyklusters", CD-R, 2007, Lona Records
- "Spiritualis", CD, 2007, Kubitsuri Tapes Int.l
- "The Valley Of Deep Shadow", CD, 2008, Menstrualrecordings
- "Atholgog", 3" CD-R, 2008, Stridulum Recordings
- "Akoustikoriginem", CD-R, 2008, Lona Records
- "Dekadenz", CD-R, 2009, Young Girls Records
- "Loopspool", mp3 album, 2009, TIBProd. Italy
- "Inexistence", CD, 2009, Cold Current
- "Habitats", CD, 2009, Kubitsuri Tapes Int.l
- "Ludium", CD, 2009, Silentes
- "March-Ex", CD-R, 2009, Lona Records
- "Persecutionem", LP, 2009, Rotorelief
- "Maurizio Bianchi Remixed Vol.1", CD-R, 2009, TIBProd.
- "Maurizio Bianchi Remixed Vol.2", CD-R, 2009, TIBProd.
- "Violichte", Cassette, 2010, Robert & Leopold
- "SFAG", Tape, 2010, Mirror Tapes (limited to 200 copies)
- "Technology-X", Tape, 2011, Mirror Tapes (limited to 250 copies, 32 copies include a film negative strip of abstract photos taken by Maurizio Bianchi)
- "Amentest", 7" Single, 2014, Dais Records
- "Opfer Unter Uns", LP, 2015, Steinklang Industries
- "Elegietroniche", CD, 2016, 4iB Records

Collaborations

- "Chaotische Fraktale", CD-R, 2003, CPS, with Frequency In Cycles Per Second
- "Letzte Technologie", CD-R, 2004, CPS, with Frequency In Cycles Per Second
- "Final Signal", CD, 2005, CPS, with Frequency In Cycles Per Second
- "Zehn Tage/Touka", CD, 2004, Afe, with Telepherique
- "Junkyo", CD, 2005, Noctovision, with Aube
- "Mectpyo Saisei", CD, 2005, Para Disc, with Aube
- "Psychoneurose", CD, 2005, Manifold, with Land Use
- "Secluded Truths", CD, 2005, Silentes, with NIMH
- "Together's Symphony", CD, 2005, Silentes, with NIMH
- "Arkaeo Planum", CD, 2006, Small Voices, with TH26
- "The House Of Mourning", CD, 2006, Radiotarab/Coldcurrent, with Telepherique
- "Endokraniosis", CD-R, 2006, Tibprod, with Siegmar Fricke
- "Genologic Technocide", CD-R, 2006, Spatter/Pagan Moon, with MDT
- "The Epidemic Symphony No. 9", CD, 2006, Octpia, with Nobu Kasahara and Hitoshi Kojo
- "Stroma-Konkret", CD, 2006, Monochrome Vision, with Siegmar Fricke
- "Environmental Meditations", CD, 2006, Topheth Prophet, with Maor Appelbaum
- "Regolelettroniche", CD, 2007, Baskaru, with Emanuela de Angelis
- "Micromal Sonorities", CD, 2007, Artecnico Inc., with Saverio Evangelista
- "Chaotische Fraktale/Letzte Technologie", 2CD, 2007, Silentes, with F.I.C.P.S.
- "Electrostatic Deflection", CD, 2007, Silentes, with Maor Appelbaum
- "Der Abgrund", CD, 2007, Silentes, with Frequency In Cycles Per Second
- "Neural Frequencies", 3" CD, 2007, Steinklang Industries, with Land Use
- "Erimos", CD, 2007, Digitalis Industries, with Hue and Fhievel
- "Nefelodhis", CD, 2007, Musica di un Certo Livello/Cold Current, with Sparkle in Grey
- "PU 94", CD-R, 2007, Simple Logic, with Craig Hilton
- "Primordium", CD-R, 2007, The Eastern Front, with Siegmar Fricke
- "TSE-K", LP, 2007, Small Voices, with Land Use
- "Paradoxos", CD-R, 2008, Tibprod, with Cheapmachines
- "M. Plus T.", CD, 2008, Silentes, with Atrax Morgue
- "Alienation", CD, 2008, Finalmuzik, with Claudio Rocchetti
- "Innervation", CD-R, 2008, Afe, with Maor Appelbaum
- "Makrokosmikro", CD-R, 2009, Menstrualrecordings, with Siegmar Fricke
- "Azazel", CD, 2009, Silentes, with Crìa Cuervos
- "Mene Teqel Farsin", CD, 2009, Silentes, with Maor Appelbaum
- "Kapnos", CD, 2009, Afe/Grey Sparkle/ctrl+alt+canc, by Meerkat (just liner notes by MB)
- "Invocalizations", CD-R, 2009, Menstrualrecordings, with Patrizia Oliva
- "As Strong As Death Is", Cassette, 2012, Robert & Leopold, with Ryan Martin
- "Isometrie Sonore", Vinyl, 2013, ozky e-sound & Arte Nel Rumore & Dischi Gatto Alieno, with Xxena, Massimo Croce, D.B.P.I.T.
- "Artemisio", TAPE, 2013, ozky e-sound & Arte Nel Rumore & Dischi Gatto Alieno, with Xxena, Massimo Croce, D.B.P.I.T.
- "Amalgamelody (with Merzbow), CD, 2015, Old Europa Cafe
- "LoopKlangeNoise” (with Magnetica Ars Lab/Arnaldo Pontis), CD, 2013, Final Musik

== Books ==
- The Art of Duration and Resonance, by Philippe Blache, 2010. Exhaustive essay about the genesis and development of Italian experimental electronic music that grew up in collaboration with MB
