= Come Back Baby (disambiguation) =

"Come Back Baby" is a 1940 song written by Walter Davis. The name may also refer to:

- "Come Back Baby", a 1965 song by Bluesology
- "Come Back Baby", a song from John Fahey's 1965 album The Transfiguration of Blind Joe Death
- "Come Back Baby", a song from Kate and Anne McGarrigle's 1978 album Pronto Monto
- "Come Back Baby", a song from Pusha T's 2018 album Daytona
- "Come Back Baby", a song from Sawyer Brown's 2002 album, Can You Hear Me Now
- "Come Back Baby", a song from 1999 re-release of Reminiscing (Buddy Holly album)
- "Come Back Baby", a pre-Steely Dan song by Walter Becker and Donald Fagen appearing on Found Studio Tracks among other compilations
- "Come Back Baby" (Dan Reed Network song), a 1990 single by Dan Reed Network

== See also ==
- Baby Come Back (disambiguation)
- Baby (disambiguation)
- Come (disambiguation)
- Back (disambiguation)
