= Compadre =

Relationship between the parents and godparents of a child

The term compadre (Spanish: [komˈpaðɾe], Portuguese: [kõˈpaðɾɨ], literally "co-father" or "co-parent") denotes the relationship between the parents and godparents of a child and is an important bond that originates when a child is baptised. It is widespread in Iberian, Latin American, Filipino Christian and Indian Goan Christian Brahmin families, as well as in some countries of Eastern Europe, such as Russia and Ukraine.

The abstract nouns compadrazgo (Spanish and Filipino) and compadrio (Portuguese), both meaning "co-parenthood," are sometimes used to refer to the institutional relationship between compadres.

At the moment of baptism, the godparents and natural parents become each other's compadres (the plural form compadres includes both male and female co-parents). The female equivalent of compadre is comadre (Spanish: [koˈmaðɾe], Portuguese: [kuˈmaðɾɨ]). Thus, the child's father will call the child's godmother "comadre," while she will call him "compadre," and so on.

In Portugal, the term is colloquially also used to refer to the parents of both parts of a couple.

== In Western Europe and Latin America ==
From the moment of a baptism ceremony, the godparents (godfather and godmother, padrino and madrina in Spanish, padrinho and madrinha in Portuguese, ninong and ninang in Filipino) share the parenting role of the baptised child with the natural parents. By Catholic doctrine, upon the child's baptism, the godparents accept the responsibility to ensure that the child is raised according to the dictates of the Catholic faith and to ensure the child pursues a life of improvement and success (through education, marriage, personal development, and so forth).

Traditionally, among Iberians and Latin Americans, this relationship formalizes a pre-existing friendship which results in a strong lifelong bond between compadres. In its original form, the compadre relationship is among the strongest types of family love soon after one's nuclear family. In many Latin American societies, lifelong friends or siblings who have always spoken to each other informally (using the informal Spanish second-person pronoun tú) may mark their new compadre relationship by using respectful or formal speech (using the formal Spanish second-person pronoun usted).

A number of other ritual occasions are considered to result in a compadre relationship in various Latin American societies. These may include ritual sponsorship of other Catholic sacraments (first communion, confirmation, and marriage); sponsorship of a quinceañera celebration; and, in Peru, sponsorship of a ritual first haircut ceremony that normally takes place when a child turns three years old.

Compadrazgo has its roots in medieval European Catholicism. The Doge of Venice Pietro II Orseolo worked all his life for creating solid contacts with the contemporary monarchs, achieving good relationships with the Byzantine Empire. On the other hand, he approximated to Otto III, Holy Roman Emperor and eventually named him literally with the title of compadre, which meant "the co-father of the Venetian Doge's children". Otto specially liked this, and became the children's godfather.

The classic Spanish novel Don Quixote (1605–1615) contains several references to compadres; however, the compadre relationship has much less formal meaning in modern Spain, where it is a reference both to a godfather/padrino or just to a best friend, with no reference to any ritual. The expression is in use particularly in southern Spain. In medieval England, parents and godparents called each other "godsibs" (that is, "God siblings"). The only trace of this old Catholic English practice in modern English is the word gossip, presumably a reference to the propensity of close companions such as compadres to chat and gossip with one another. In Spanish, the verb comadrear (from comadre) similarly means "to gossip," as does the French cognate commérage (from commère).

The term compadre has been extended in some regions, such as Brazil, to describe a common relationship between two good friends. In the Alentejo region of Portugal, compadre is a term used as an informal manner of address between any two, usually elderly, male acquaintances. In Argentina and Paraguay, the word is used in popular speech (especially in the diminutive, compadrito) to mean "braggart, loud-mouth, bully." However, among more traditional Latin American and Hispanic/Latino families, the word retains its original meaning and symbolism, and for its members, to be asked to be a padrino or compadre is a great, lifelong honor.

== See also ==
- Human bonding
- Bro (subculture)
- Kum (godfather)

== Bibliography ==
- Alum, R., 1977, "El Parentesco Ritual en un Batey Dominicano [Ritual Kinship in a Dominican Batey]," Revista Eme-Eme. Santiago de los Caballeros, Dominican Republic: Universidad Católica Madre y Maestra; V (26): 11-36.
- Berruecos, L., 1976, El Compadrazgo en América Latina; Análisis Antropológico de 106 Casos. México: Instituto Indigenista Interamericano.
- Foster, G., 1953, “Cofradia and compadrazgo in Spain and Spanish America,” Southwestern Journal of Anthropology; 9:1-28.
- Gudeman, S.; & S. B. Schwartz, 1984, Cleansing Original Sin; Godparenthood and Baptism of Slaves in 18th-Century Bahia; IN: R. T. Smith, ed.; Kinship Ideology and Practice in Latin America. Chapel Hill: University of North Carolina Press; pp. 35–58.
- Nutini, Hugo, and Betty Bell, 1980, Ritual Kinship: The Structure of the Compadrazgo System in Rural Tlaxcala. Princeton: Princeton University Press.
- Nutini, Hugo, 1984, Ritual Kinship: Ideological and Structural Integration of the Compadrazgo System in Rural Tlaxcala. Princeton: Princeton University Press.
- Ossio, J., 1984, Cultural Continuity, Structure, and Context; Some Peculiarities of the Andean Compadrazgo; IN: R. T. Smith, ed.; Kinship Ideology and Practice in Latin America. Chapel Hill: University of North Carolina Press; pp. 118–46.
- Velez‐Calle, A., Robledo‐Ardila, C., & Rodriguez‐Rios, J. D. (2015). On the influence of interpersonal relations on business practices in Latin America: A comparison with the Chinese guanxi and the Arab Wasta. Thunderbird International Business Review, 57(4), 281-293.
