= Epinette =

Epinette can refer to:

- Chardonnay, a wine grape that is also known as Epinette
- Saint-Pierre Doré, another wine grape that is also known as Epinette
- Epinette des Vosges, a diatonic fretted zither from the Vosges region of France
- Spinet, small keyboard instrument
- Épinettes, a district in the 17th arrondissement of Paris
