= Mauthausen Orchestra =

- Origin: Italy
- Genres: Power electronics
- Years active: 1982–1986, 1997–2010
- Labels: Aquilifer Sodality
- Past members: Pierpaolo Zoppo

Mauthausen Orchestra is a musical group founded by Pierpaolo Zoppo, Italian noise musician of the early industrial and power electronics school from the 1980s. Along with Maurizio Bianchi he was one of the pioneers of Italian noise.

Zoppo's work explored morbid subjects, usually extreme sex, perversion, nazism, tortures and disease. The sound was a brutal collage of noise, electronics distortions and very high pitched vocals. The original Mauthausen Orchestra albums were published on Zoppo's own label, Aquilifer Sodality. The original phase of Mauthausen Orchestra ended in 1986, but reformed in 1997 to release new material. Between 1986 - 1997, there was also a Mauthausen Orchestra track called "Kill The P.A.S.T." from "Power To Destroy", an early 90s comp on a label owned by The Grey Wolves. This was credited to simply "Mauthausen". Following a brief return to music in 2008 to work on Ambient music, on June 16, 2012, Pierpaolo died.

== Discography ==
=== Albums ===
- Mauthausen Orchestra - 1982 (Private tape, limited to 10 copies)
- 2nd Movement - 1983
- Dedicated To J. Goebbels - 1983
- Necrofellatio - 1983
- Conflict - 1983
- Vernichtung Lebenunwerten Leben - 1983
- Uneasiness - 1984
- Mafarka - 1984
- Bloodyminded - 1984
- Anal Perversions - 1985
- They Never Learn - 1985
- Host Sodomy - 1986
- Raising Vapors - 1997
- Where Are We Going? - 2008
- From Unhealthy Places (with Nimh) - 2009
- Digression - 2010
- Material Modulations (with Maurizio Bianchi) - 2012
- Dramatisch - 2012
- Spiritual Noises (with Maurizio Bianchi) - 2012
