= Baby Come Back =

Baby Come Back may refer to:

== Music ==
- "Baby Come Back", a 1957 song by Johnny Rivers
  - "Santa Bring My Baby Back (To Me)", a Christmas-themed rewrite of the Johnny Rivers song, made popular by Elvis Presley
- "Baby, Come Back" (The Equals song), 1967
  - Baby, Come Back (album), 1968 album by The Equals
- "Baby Come Back" (Player song), a 1977 song
- "Baby Come Back", a 1984 song by Billy Rankin from the album Growin' Up Too Fast
- "Baby Come Back", a 1995 song by Worlds Apart
- "Baby Come Back", a 2000 songs from Casino by Alcazar

== Other uses ==
- "Baby Come Back", a RocketLab spaceflight mission on 18 July 2023; see List of Electron launches

== See also ==
- Come Back Baby (disambiguation)
- Baby Come Back to Me (disambiguation)
- Baby (disambiguation)
- Come (disambiguation)
- Back (disambiguation)
