= Ramleh (band) =

British experimental music group

- Origin: United Kingdom
- Genres: Power electronics; noise; death industrial; noise rock; psychedelic rock
- Years active: 1982–1984; 1987; 1989–1997; 2009–present
- Labels: Broken Flag; Pure; Sympathy for the Record Industry; Minus Habens
- Members: Gary Mundy; Anthony di Franco; Stuart Dennison
- Past members: Bob Strudwick; Stefan Jaworzyn; Matthew Bower; Sarah Froelich; Stuart Rossiter; Philip Best; Martin Watts; Jerome Clegg
- Website: www.brokenflag.com

Ramleh are a British experimental music group formed by musician Gary Mundy in 1982. The current line-up of the band includes Gary Mundy, Anthony di Franco and Stuart Dennison. Originally a part of the English power electronics and industrial music scene in early 1980s, Ramleh experimented with a more traditional rock format in their later releases.

== History ==
The group was formed by Mundy in 1982 as a part of the power electronics scene in early 1980s, which included artists such as Whitehouse and Sutcliffe Jugend. The band's 21/5/62/82 cassette was released in 1982 and was titled as a reference to the execution of Nazi war criminal Adolf Eichmann. Ramleh recorded four more cassette releases in 1982: Onslaught, Live to Theresienstadt, Live New Force, and Live Phenol. Live McCarthy, Live at Moden Tower 12/10/1983, and Live at Prossneck 1/10/83, A Return to Slavery and The Hand of Glory EPs were added to the band's catalogue in 1983. This was followed by a string of cassette releases in 1983. Although Ramleh disbanded in 1984, Mundy's own record label Broken Flag continued releasing Ramleh material.

After releasing Hole in the Heart cassette and a few records under the Ramleh alias in 1987, Mundy reformed the band in 1989 with Philip Best. The reunion was followed by Grudge for Life LP in 1989. Inspired by Mundy's experimental rock band Skullflower, the band began to incorporate rock influences in their records, starting with Blowhole in 1991. After releasing Caught From Behind, a split with Italian artist M.T.T, and Crystal Revenge, the band added Skullflower members Anthony di Franco on bass and Stuart Dennison on drums to its line-up. The new line-up released Homeless in 1994. The band continued releasing rock records in late 1990s, which included Adieu, All You Judges and Be Careful What You Wish For in 1995, and Works III in 1996. After releasing Boeing, Mundy disbanded Ramleh for the second time.

In 2009, Mundy and di Franco reformed Ramleh with drummer Martyn Watts. In that year, the band also returned to its original power electronics aesthetics with Valediction LP, although Mundy states that the band will be performing in both rock and electronic genres. In 2015, Stuart Dennison returned to drum with Ramleh and played on the US west coast tour in January 2016.

== Musical style and imagery ==
Early recordings of Ramleh were labeled as power electronics and noise music. Nevertheless, in the 1990s, the band started to experiment with more traditional rock music structures. The band's more traditional works were commonly labeled as "noise rock." Frances Morgan of The Quietus described the band’s music during this era as "a brutal, abject strand of dark psychedelic rock," while albums such as Works III and Boeing were labeled as "heavy psych-noise rock." Skullflower and Butthole Surfers were influences on these works. Ramleh's first album after the 2009 reunion expressed a revival of the band's original power electronics genre and was compared to the works of Japanese noise musician Merzbow, while the band retained its rock music instrumentation during this era, performing on both genres.

In its early days, Ramleh flirted with Nazi and fascist imagery for its shock value, like other bands in the industrial music scene. Nevertheless, Mundy and Best since discontinued this practice and disavowed it, denying any affiliations with hate groups.

== Band members ==
Current members

- Gary Mundy – vocals, guitar, keyboards, electronics (1982–1984, 1987, 1989–1997, 2009–present)
- Anthony di Franco – bass, keyboards, electronics, vocals (1993–1997, 2009–present)
- Stuart Dennison – drums (1993–1997, 2015–present)
- Martyn Watts – drums (2009–present)

Past members

- Bob Strudwick – vocals, bass, electronics (1982–1983)
- Jerome Clegg – vocals, electronics (1983–1984)
- Stefan Jaworzyn – guitar (1988)
- Matthew Bower – guitar, electronics (1987–1988)
- Philip Best – vocals, keyboards, electronics (1989–1997, 2019)
- Stuart Rossiter – second guitar (1994–1995)
- Sarah Froelich – keyboards, electronics (2019)

== Discography ==
Studio albums and LP records

- A Return to Slavery (1983)
- Grudge for Life (1989)
- Blowhole (1991)
- Caught From Behind (1990)
- Crystal Revenge / Paid In Full (1991)
- Shooters Hill (1992)
- Homeless (1994)
- Adieu, All You Judges (1995)
- Be Careful What You Wish For (1995)
- Boeing (1997)
- Valediction (2009)
- Live Valediction (2013)
- Circular Time (2015)
- The Great Unlearning (2019)
- Hyper Vigilance (2025)

Demo albums and cassette tapes

- Onslaught (1982)
- 31/5/62/82 (1982)
- Live to Theresienstadt (1982)
- Live New Force (1982)
- Live Phenol (1982)
- Live Prossneck, 1/10/83 (1983)
- Live at Moden Tower, 12/10/983 (1983)
- Live McCarthy (1983)
- As I Have Won (1984)
- Nerve (1986)
- Hole in the Heart (1987)
- Pumping (1987)
- Tomorrow We Live
- A Penis Tense Not Penitence
- Soundcheck Changeling (1994)
- Airborne Babel (1995)

Extended plays and singles

- The Hand of Glory EP (1983)
- "Slammers" (1990)
- "Loser Patrol" (1992)
- "Say Fuck" (1993)
- "8 Ball Corner Pocket" (1993)
- "Welcome" (1994)
- "Dicey Opera" (1995)
- "Switch Hitter" (2009)
- Guidelines EP (2011)

Compilation albums

- 104 Weeks (1984)
- Awake! (1985)
- We Created It, Let's Take It Over Vol. I (1995)
- We Created It, Let's Take It Over Vol. II (1995)
- We Created It, Let's Take It Over Vol. III (1995)
- Live 1983 (1995)
- Works III (1996)
- Too Many Miles (2002)
