= Eriston =

Ancient town in Tenos, Greece

Eriston (Ancient Greek: Ἤριστον), or Eristus or Eristos (Ἠρίστῳς), was an ancient inland town on the island of Tenos. It is mentioned in ancient inscriptions.

Its site is unlocated, but may be the same as Come.
