= Kym =

Kym or KYM may refer to:

- River Kym, in Cambridgeshire, England
- Kym (singer) (born 1983), or Jin Sha, Chinese singer and actress
- Know Your Meme, an internet meme documentation blog
- Kpatili language's ISO 639 code

== People with the given name ==
- Kym Bonython (1920–2011), member of Adelaide society
- Kym Dillon, sports presenter for Nine News Adelaide
- Kym Gyngell (born 1952), Australian comedian and film, television and stage actor
- Kym Hampton (born 1962), American basketball player
- Kym Hodgeman, former Australian rules footballer
- Kym Howe (born 1980), Australian athlete
- Kym Karath (born 1958), American actress
- Kym Johnson (born 1976), Australian professional ballroom dancer and television performer
- Kym Lomas (born 1976), English actress and former singer
- Kym Mazelle (born 1960), American dance-pop, Hi-NRG, soul and house singer
- Kym Ng, Singaporean actress and television host
- Kym Richardson (born 1958), Australian politician
- Kym Sims (born 1966), American singer
- Kym Valentine (born 1977), Australian actress
- Kym Whitley (born 1961), American actress and comedian
- Kym Wilson (born 1973), Australian actress

== People with the surname ==
- Jérôme Kym (born 2003), Swiss tennis player

== Fictional characters ==
- Kym Buchman, main character in Rachel Getting Married, a 2008 American drama film

== See also ==
- Kim (disambiguation)
- Kum (disambiguation)
- Keum (disambiguation)
- Khim
- Jin (Chinese surname)
- Jin (Korean surname)
- Ghim
- Qin (surname)
