= Atrax Morgue =

Italian noise musician

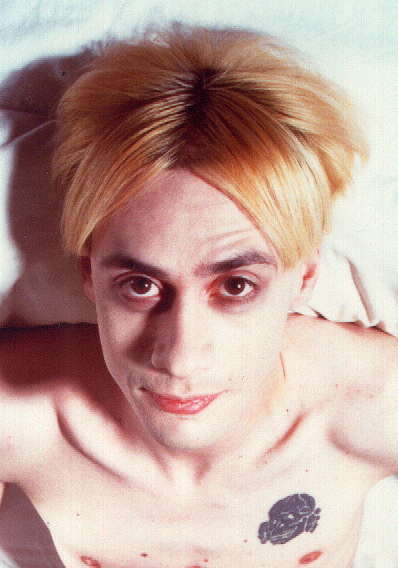

Background information
- Born: Marco Corbelli; 3 April 1970; Sassuolo, Italy
- Died: 6 May 2007 (aged 37) Castellarano, Italy
- Genres: Noise, industrial, dark ambient, power electronics

Marco Corbelli (also known as Marco Rotula; 3 April 1970 – 6 May 2007), better known professionally as Atrax Morgue, was an Italian noise musician. Relying primarily on the Sequential Circuits Six-Trak synthesizer to make noise music and drone music, he acquired an online cult following posthumously, in the 2010s. Much of Atrax Morgue's early sound material was released on audio cassette, as part of the industrial music/noise music 'cassette culture underground' of the early 1990s. Often these cassettes were released on Corbelli's own Slaughter Productions Records, some of which were reissued as CD-Rs.

Throughout the late 1990s, Atrax Morgue released numerous albums on prominent noise music labels, such as Relapse, Old Europa Cafe, RRRecords, Crowd Control Activities and Ars Benevola Mater. As a performer, on February 24, 2001, Corbelli took part in the Autopsia dell’opera d’arte vivente come vivisezione del corpo di dio performance art event in an art gallery in Viareggio. He was inspired by power electronics acts Whitehouse, Brighter Death Now and The Sodality.

Corbelli committed suicide by hanging on May 6, 2007, at the age of 37.

== Partial discography ==
- Black Slaughter (Cass) Slaughter Productions 1993
- In Search of Death (Cass) Slaughter Productions 1993
- Necrosintesi (Cass) Slaughter Productions 1993
- Collection in Formaldeide (Cass) Slaughter Productions 1994
- Necrophiliac Experience (Cass) Slaughter Productions 1994
- New York Ripper (Cass, S/Sided, C60) Slaughter Productions 1994
- Woundfucker (Cass) Slaughter Productions 1994
- Basic Autopsy Procedure (Cass, S/Sided) Slaughter Productions 1995
- Catch My Agony (Cass, Ltd, C30) Slaughter Productions 1995
- Esthetik of a Corpse (Cass, C60) Slaughter Productions 1995
- Exterminate (Cass) Slaughter Productions 1995
- Homicidal Texture (Cass) Slaughter Productions 1995
- Pathophysiology (Cass) Old Europa Cafe 1995
- Untitled (Cass) Slaughter Productions 1995
- Autoerotic Death (Cass, Ltd) BloodLust! 1996
- Cut My Throat (CD) Slaughter Productions 1996
- Extended Autoerotic Death (Cass, Ltd, C60) BloodLust! 1996
- Forced Entry / N.C.W. (Cass) SSSM 1996
- Lesion 22 (Cass, Ltd) Less Than Zero 1996
- Sickness Report (CD) Release Entertainment 1996
- Studio - Live Material 1996 (Cass) Slaughter Productions 1996
- Sweetly (Cass, S/Sided, Ltd) Murder Release 1996
- Aminobenzolmessias (LP) abRECt 1997
- James Oliver Huberty (7") Self Abuse Records 1997
- Slush of a Maniac (CD) Crowd Control Activities 1997
- DeathShow (with Morder Machine) CD (Slaughter Productions, 1998)
- Disconnected (CDr) Sin Organisation 1998
- Woundfucker (CD) AVA/ES1-Reset 1998
- Overcome (LP) Slaughter Productions 1999
- Esthetik of a Corpse (CDr) Slaughter Productions 2000
- Exterminate (CDr) Slaughter Productions 2000
- In Search of Death (CDr) Slaughter Productions 2000
- Paranoia (CD) Old Europa Cafe 2000
- Homicidal / Mechanic Asphyxia (CDr) Slaughter Productions 2001
- I Vizi Morbosi Di Una Giovane Infermiera (CDr) Slaughter Productions 2001
- Necrophiliac Experience / Necrosintesi (CDr) Slaughter Productions 2001
- New York Ripper (CDr) Slaughter Productions 2001
- Basic Autopsy Procedure / Homicidal Texture (CDr) Slaughter Productions 2002
- Collection in Formaldeide (CDr) Slaughter Productions 2002
- La Casa Dalle Finestre Che Ridono (CDr) Slaughter Productions 2002
- Pathophysiology (CDr) Transf/Order 2002
- Sweetly (CDr, Album) Spatter 2002
- Death - Orgasm Connector (CD) Slaughter Productions 2003
- No More (CD) Amplexus 2004
- Her Guts (7", Ltd, Whi) BloodLust! 2005
- No More (CD) Ars Benevola Mater 2005
- Claustrophobic Introduction (CDr, Ltd, 155) Mind Terrorism Productions 2006
- Frustration (CDr, B/card) En.mi.ty Records 2006
- Inorganic Introduction Pt.II (File, MP3) Radical Matters 2006
- Negative Frequencies (CDr) Slaughter Productions 2006
- Pathophysiology (CDr) Old Europa Cafe 2006
