= Come (British band) =

British noise music band

- Origin: United Kingdom
- Genres: Industrial; post-punk; industrial rock; noise
- Years active: 1979–1980; 1981
- Label: Come Organisation
- Past members: William Bennett; Daniel Miller; Peter McKay; J.G. Thirlwell

Come was a British noise music project, which was founded in 1979 by William Bennett. In the short time of its existence it had such prominent members as Daniel Miller and J. G. Thirlwell. Bennett would later end the project in 1980 in favor for his then newly formed power electronics project Whitehouse, however a second studio album under the Come moniker was released in 1981 titled I'm Jack. The independent record label Come Organisation was created as a result of the lack of interest other labels showed in the group's recordings. They never performed live.

While all of their material is largely out-of-print, most of their Rampton LP can be found on the Susan Lawly double disc compilation Anthology 1 Come Organisation Archives 1979-1980, and the entirety of I'm Jack is included on Anthology 2 Come Organisation Archives 2 1981-1982. Rampton was officially re-released through the digital music distribution platform Bandcamp on 20 March 2025.

== Discography ==
=== Studio albums ===
- Rampton (1979)
- I'm Jack (1981)

=== Singles ===
- "Come" (1979)

=== Compilation appearances ===
Album	Track(s)	Label	Year
The Second Coming	"In Country"	Come Organisation	1982
Anthology 1: Come Organisation Archives 1979-1980	"Come Sunday", "The Trenches", "Sex", "Rampton 1", "Rampton 2", "Shaved Slits 2", "In Country"	Susan Lawly	1998
Anthology 2: Come Organisation Archives 1981-1982	"President Your Prick's Stiff", "By God's Very Own Fuck"	Susan Lawly	2001

== See also ==
- Nurse with Wound list
