= Come Back to Me =

Come Back to Me may refer to:

== Film ==
- Come Back to Me (1944 film), a 1944 German film
- Doll Face, or Come Back to Me, a 1945 American musical romantic comedy
- Come Back to Me (1959 film), a South Korean film featuring Kim Seung-ho
- Come Back to Me (2014 film), a 2014 American film based on the book The Resurrectionist by Wrath James White

== Music ==
=== Songs ===
- "Come Back to Me", a song from the 1965 musical On a Clear Day You Can See Forever
- "Come Back to Me", a song by Uriah Heep on their album Fallen Angel, 1978
- "Come Back to Me", a song by X from Under the Big Black Sun, 1982
- "Come Back to Me" (Janet Jackson song), 1989
- "Come Back to Me" (Indecent Obsession song), 1990
- "Come Back to Me" (Ayreon song), 2005
- "Come Back to Me", a song by the Plain White T's from Every Second Counts, 2006
- "Come Back to Me" (Vanessa Hudgens song), 2006
- "Come Back to Me" (David Cook song), 2009
- "Come Back to Me" (Hikaru Utada song), 2009
- "Come Back to Me", a song by Liam Gallagher from As You Were, 2017

=== Albums ===
- Come Back to Me (album), by Peter One, 2023

== Other uses ==
- "Come Back to Me" (Desperate Housewives), an episode of Desperate Housewives

== See also ==
- Baby Come Back to Me (disambiguation)
