= Saint-Côme (disambiguation) =

Saint-Côme is the French spelling for Saint Cosmas and may also refer to:

== Places ==
It may refer to several communities around the world:

=== Canada ===
- Saint-Côme, Quebec, a parish municipality in the province of Quebec
- Saint-Côme–Linière, Quebec, a municipality in the province of Quebec

=== France ===
- Saint-Côme, a commune in the Gironde department in Aquitaine
- Saint-Côme-d'Olt, a commune in the Aveyron department
- Saint-Côme-de-Fresné, a commune in the department of Calvados in the Basse-Normandie region
- Saint-Côme-du-Mont, a commune in the Manche department in Normandy
- Saint-Côme-et-Maruéjols, a commune in the Gard department

== Other ==
- Saint Come, a wine label
