= Baby Come Back to Me =

Baby Come Back to Me may refer to:

- "Baby Come Back to Me", a 2018 song by Kane Brown from the album Experiment
- "It Was You (Baby Come Back to Me)", a 2016 song by Wild Belle from the album Dreamland
- "Baby Come Back to Me", a 2006 song by Vanessa Hudgens from her debut album V, later retitled "Come Back to Me" before release
- "Baby Come Back to Me", a 2000 song by Human Nature from their eponymous album Human Nature
- "Baby Come Back to Me", a 1998 song by 911 from the album Moving On
- "Baby Come Back to Me (The Morse Code of Love)", a 1984 song by The Manhattan Transfer from the album Bop Doo-Wopp
- "Baby Come Back to Me", a 1953 single by Tommy Hunt

== See also ==
- Come Back to Me (disambiguation)
- Baby Come Back (disambiguation)
