= Keum =

Keum may refer to:

== Name ==
- Keum (琴), Middle Chinese of string musical instruments, Qin (琴)
- Keum (琴), common of Kum (琴)
- Keum (琴), common of Kym (surname) the Cantonese of Qin (surname) (琴), Jin (surname) (金)
- Keum (琴 or 今), also spelled Geum, the romanization of the rare Korean surname 금.

== People ==
- Keum Na-na, (琴) Miss Korea 2002

== See also ==
- Qin (disambiguation)
- Kum (disambiguation)
