= Trevor Brown (artist) =

British artist (born 1959)

Trevor Brown (born 1959) is an English artist from London but based in Japan. His "occasionally shocking" work explores issues of paraphilia.

== Life and work ==
Brown was born in the London metropolitan area in 1959. After attending art school, he worked for graphic design studios and advertising agencies and was a freelance illustrator. In the mid-1980s, he began publishing booklets of his illustrations in the "industrial music culture" mail-order scene. Brown has been living and working in Japan since 1994.

His work explores paraphilias, such as lolicon, ero guro, BDSM, and other fetish themes. Innocence, violence, misogyny, and Japanese popular culture all collide in Brown's art.

Early features on Trevor Brown's art appeared in Adam Parfrey's Apocalypse Culture II, Shade Rupe's Funeral Party 2, and in Jim Goad's Answer Me! zine. Since then his interviews and art have been featured in numerous publications worldwide, most recently on the cover of the Gothic & Lolita Bible in Japan. His work also appears on a variety of book and record covers. He has illustrated for Coup de Grace an edition of Friedrich Nietzsche's The Antichrist. Brown has also had several books of his art published.

== Publications ==
- Evil (1996)
- Forbidden Fruit (1997)
- My Alphabet (1999)
- Temple of Blasphemy (1999)
- Medical Fun (2001)
- Li'l Miss Sticky Kiss (2004)
- Rubber Doll (2007)
- Babies Book (2007)
- Trevor Brown's Alice (2010)
- Girls War (2013)
- Pandora (2015)
- Trecos (2017)
- La Nursery Noire (2019)
- Pastel Poison (2023)

== Exhibitions ==
- 1995: "Evil", NG Gallery, Tokyo, Japan
- 1996: "Doll Hospital", Keibunsha Art Box, Kyoto, Japan
- 1996: "Evil Twin", NG Gallery, Tokyo, Japan
- 1997: "Japabon", Taco-che, Tokyo, Japan
- 1997: "Forbidden Fruit", Azzlo Gallery, Tokyo, Japan
- 1998: "Trevor Brown and Toshio Saeki", Merry Karnowski Gallery, Los Angeles
- 1999: "My Alphabet", Merry Karnowski Gallery, Los Angeles
- 2001: "Sexy Nurse", Taco-che, Tokyo, Japan
- 2001: "Rope, Rapture and Bloodshed" (with Antoine Bernhart), Mondo Bizzarro Gallery, Bologna, Italy
- 2001: "Medical Fun", Span Art Gallery, Tokyo, Japan
- 2002: "New World" (with Keiti Ota), Merry Karnowski Gallery, Los Angeles
- 2003: "Retrospective", Mondo Bizzarro Gallery, Bologna, Italy
- 2004: "Valentine Fair", Taco-che, Tokyo, Japan
- 2004: "Li'l Miss Sticky Kiss", Gallery Le Deco, Tokyo, Japan
- 2005: "Sakura", Taco-che, Tokyo, Japan
- 2007: "Rubber Doll", Gallery Le Deco, Tokyo, Japan
- 2007: "Rubber Doll", Subterraneans, Osaka, Japan
- 2007: "Babies Exhibition", Taco-che, Tokyo, Japan
- 2010: "Time of Alice" (with Yuriko Yamayoshi), Bunkamura Gallery, Tokyo, Japan
- 2012: "Toy Box", Span Art Gallery, Ginza, Tokyo (with Hippie Coco)
- 2013: "女の子戦争 (Girls War)", Bunkamura Gallery, Shibuya, Tokyo
- 2014: "ドローイング・ブック (Drawing Book)", parabolica-bis, Asakusa, Tokyo
- 2015: "トレヴァー・ブラウン / 三浦悦子 / 記念展示" (mini-exhibition), Sanseido Bookstore, Ikebukuro, Tokyo (with Etsuko Miura)
- 2015: "二つの聖餐 －闇から光へ－ (Holy Communion - From Darkness to Light)", Bunkamura Gallery, Shibuya, Tokyo (with Etsuko Miura)
- 2015: "Trajectory of Trevor Brown" (mini-exhibition), Span Art Gallery, Ginza, Tokyo (with Etsuko Miura)
- 2016: "Trevor Brown × 七菜乃", Span Art Gallery, Ginza, Tokyo (collaboration with Nananano)
- 2017: "Editions Treville 20th Anniversary", Merry Art Gallery, Yokohama (group show)
- 2018: "トレコス出版記念展" (Trecos Publication Commemoration), Span Art Gallery, Ginza, Tokyo (with Nananano & Mari Shimizu)
- 2019: "La Nursery Noire", Gallery le Deco, Shibuya, Tokyo
- 2023: "Pastel Poison", Gallery le Deco, Shibuya, Tokyo
- 2025: "Tarot", Gallery le Deco, Shibuya, Tokyo (1–5 October)
- 2026: "RED", Red Cube Gallery, Suginami City, Tokyo (4–15 April)

== Album and single covers ==
- Babuchan - SHIGO-NIKKI (2018)
- Bushpig Scat Butcher - The Art of Gore (2018)
- Che - Fully Loaded (2026)
- Che - Empty Clip (2026)
- Coil - The Unreleased Themes for Hellraiser (1987)
- Come Again II compilation (1993)
- Crystal Castles - Alice Practice (2006)
- The Dead Pop Stars - DPS (1997)
- Deicide - Once upon the Cross (1995)
- Despair - Beautiful Japanese Sight (2004)
- Extreme Music From Africa compilation (1997)
- GG Allin - Watch Me Kill (1991)
- Hoppy Kamiyama - ESP (1995)
- Jarboe - Beast (1998)
- John Zorn - The Gift (2001)
- Noise/Girl - Discopathology (2001)
- Noise/Girl - Darkroom
- The Sadist - Last Live 1990 (1992)
- Urbangarde - Syojo Ha Nido Shinu (Girls Only Live Twice) (2008)
- Venetian Snares - Doll Doll Doll (2001)
- Venetian Snares - Winter in the Belly of a Snake (2002)
- Venetian Snares - Find Candace (2003)
- Venetian Snares - Horse and Goat (2004)
- Whitehouse - Another Crack of the White Whip (1991)
- Whitehouse - Twice Is Not Enough (1992)
- Whitehouse - Halogen (1994)
- Whitehouse - Quality Time (1995)
- Whitehouse - "Just Like a Cunt" (1996)
- Various Artists - Eyelicker Compilation (2006)
