= Twice Is Not Enough =

Studio album by Whitehouse
- Released: January 1992
- Recorded: 1991
- Genre: Power electronics, dark ambient
- Length: 38:15
- Label: Susan Lawly
- Producer: Whitehouse, Steve Albini, Scorpio

Whitehouse chronology
Thank Your Lucky Stars (1990)	Twice Is Not Enough (1992)	Never Forget Death (1992)

Professional ratings
Review scores
Source	Rating
AllMusic	4/5 stars

Twice Is Not Enough is the eleventh studio album by power electronics band Whitehouse, released in 1991 through Susan Lawly. The album cover, depicting a dog sitting on a bed, was drawn by Trevor Brown, and references multiple different murders performed by serial killers. In 1999, the album was reissued as a special edition CD with bonus tracks, all of which originated from the band's 1992 album Never Forget Death, which was out-of-print by that point in time.

== Track listing ==
No.	Title	Writer(s)	Length
1.	"To Die"	W. Bennett	3:30
2.	"Neronia"	S. Albini, W. Bennett	5:15
3.	"Fanatics"	P. Sotos, W. Bennett	5:31
4.	"Heads You Lose"	W. Bennett	4:51
5.	"The White Whip"	S. Jaworzyn, W. Bennett	4:36
6.	"Masters of the Overviolence"	S. Jaworzyn, W. Bennett	6:13
7.	"Revolution"	W. Bennett	3:59
8.	"Twice Is Not Enough"	W. Bennett	4:20

Special Edition bonus tracks (Never Forget Death)
No.	Title	Length
9.	"Never Forget Death"	8:11
10.	"Now Is The Time"	7:39
11.	"Asking For It"	10:26
12.	"Torture Chamber"	6:33
Total length:		71:04

== Personnel ==
- William Bennett – vocals, synthesizers, production
- Peter Sotos – lyrics
- Dave Kenny – production
- Steve Albini – production (on "Neronia")
- Scorpio – production (on "Fanatics")
- Alan Gifford – graphic design
- Denis Blackham – mastering
- Trevor Brown – artwork
