= Ghim =

Ghim is a surname and given name. Notable people with this name include:

- Doug Ghim (born 1996), American golf player
- Yeap Ghim Guan (1941–2007), Malaysian politician
- Yeoh Ghim Seng (1918–1993), Singaporean politician
