= Kum (godfather) =

Slavic term for godfather

In Eastern Christianity of East Slavic cultures the ritual of baptism is seen as a rite of initiation, which makes the newborn part of the family and simultaneously designates the child as member of the Church of God. Kum (godfather) and kuma (godmother) serve as key participants of that ritual on par with the parents, midwife and the priest. In relation to the child the godparents (Ukrainian: хрещені/хресні батьки, Russian: крёстные родители) are known under the terms which can be literally translated as "baptismal father" and "baptismal mother" (Ukrainian: хрещений батько, хрещена мати; Russian: крёстные отец и мать) of the godchild (Ukrainian: хрещеник, Russian: крестник). In Galician dialect the child's godparents are also known as nanashko (нанашко) and nanashka (нанашка). A girl who had common godparents with another child would also be known as "baptized sister" (Ukrainian: хрещена сестра).

== Etymology ==
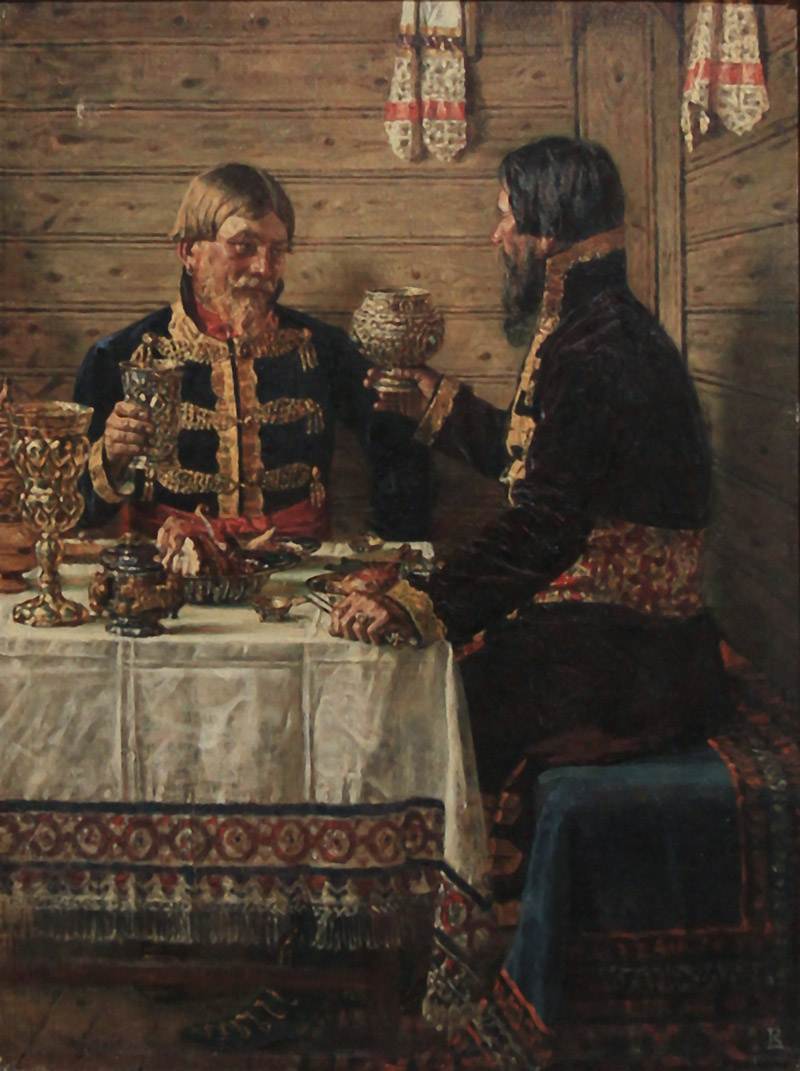
"Good Kums", by Vasily Vereshchagin

Kum (Russian and Ukrainian: кум, Ukrainian pronunciation: [kum] derives from Balkan Vulgar Latin cómmater - "godmother").

The corresponding relationship is known as kumovstvo (Russian: кумовство, Russian pronunciation: [kʊmɐfstˈvo]) or kumivstvo (Ukrainian: кумівство, Ukrainian pronunciation: [kʊˈmʲiu̯stwɔ]). The word is also used in the meaning of "nepotism".

The word "kum" is also used in the meaning of "good friend".

In the East Slavic folklore, "kum" is a traditional epithet for wolf and "kuma" for fox.

== History ==
Historically, in the traditional culture of Ukraine a number of rituals have existed to celebrate the bonds between people from different families. During the Green holidays women in Ukraine would engage in the tradition known as кумування (literally - "kuma-becoming"), during which a kerchief and coral jewelry would be given to a potential kuma. In Polesia girls would give each other birch wreaths and yellow-painted eggs, kissing and wishing for themselves to become kumas in the future. Godparents for one's child were usually chosen from among in-laws, people respected in the community or simply those with whom the family was befriended.

According to ethnographer Pavlo Chubynskyi, after a child was born, its father would visit the man he had chosen to be his kum with bread and salt, and take the host's bread in exchange. The same ritual was repeated when choosing the kuma. According to Ivan Ohienko, it was not allowed to refuse such a proposal. In the region of Kholm there was a special ritual where a man who had become kum for the first time would be put on a sledge covered with hay and driven from his house to the house of his parents with great honour. Many Ukrainian proverbs and sayings are dedicated to friendly relations between a person and their kum or kuma. After baptism, kum and kuma would serve as the child's "second parents". However, if the child died, its godparents would lose their status, and in this case the traditional way of finding kum or kuma for a new child was to ask the first person met on the way.

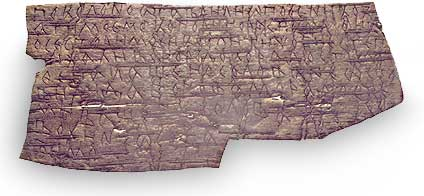
Birch bark letter from Veliky Novgorod, c. 1350, written by a certain Gavrila to his kum Grigory

In modern Russian language the terms kum and kuma do not always signify godparents of one's child, but can be used in respect to close friends of the family or best man and best maid during a wedding. In Russia until the 15th century there was a tradition of taking only one godparent for a child, but nowadays it is common to have two godparents - mother and father. They must belong to the same church as the family of the baptized child; it is not allowed for godparents to be each other's husband and wife. According to church law, biological parents cannot serve as their own child's godparents.

Kum and kuma played an important role in bringing up their godchild, would be invited to all family celebrations and received special attention. On the day of Saint Emilian (21 January) it was common to invite one's kum and kuma for a visit, during which they would present the hosts with soap and a towel, which had protected their godchild from evil eye and illness, after which a feast would be organized. Many Russian proverbs and songs are dedicated to the relations with kum and kuma. They are also mentioned in literary works by Nikolai Gogol, Alexander Pushkin, Leo Tolstoy, Nikolay Leskov, Ivan Bunin and other classics of Russian literature.

== See also ==
- Sandek
