= Come (Tenos) =

Ancient town on the island of Tenos

Come or Kome (Ancient Greek: Κώμη) was an ancient town on the island of Tenos. It is mentioned in ancient inscriptions.

Its site is tentatively located on Tenos.
