= Saint-Pierre Doré =

Variety of grape

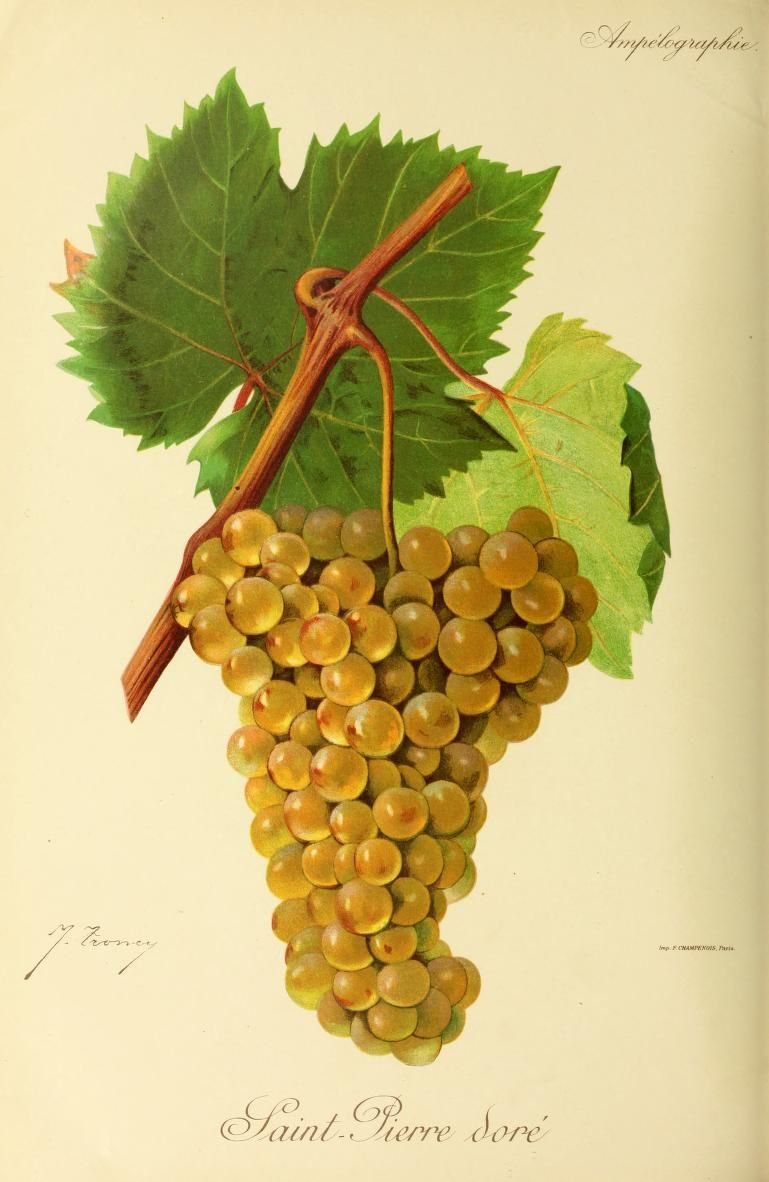
An illustration of the grape variety.

Saint-Pierre Doré (French pronunciation: [sɛ̃ pjɛʁ dɔʁe]) is a white French wine grape variety grown primarily around the Saint-Pourçain AOC in the Auvergne region of Central France. While the grape has a long history in the region of being very productive and producing high yields, its plantings have been steadily declining over the last century and now the variety is almost extinct.

DNA profiling has confirmed that it is one of several varieties descended from Gouais blanc, the French white grape variety that is also the mother vine to Chardonnay, Gamay and Melon de Bourgogne as well as several other varieties.

== Synonyms ==
Over the years Saint-Pierre Doré has been known under a variety of synonyms including Cerceau, Epinette, Epinette blanc, Epinette blanche, Firminhac, Lucane, Per Dore, Roussellou, Saint-Clair, Saint Come, Saint Pierre, San Per Dore and Saint-Pierre de l'Allier.
