= Whitehouse (band) =

British power electronics band

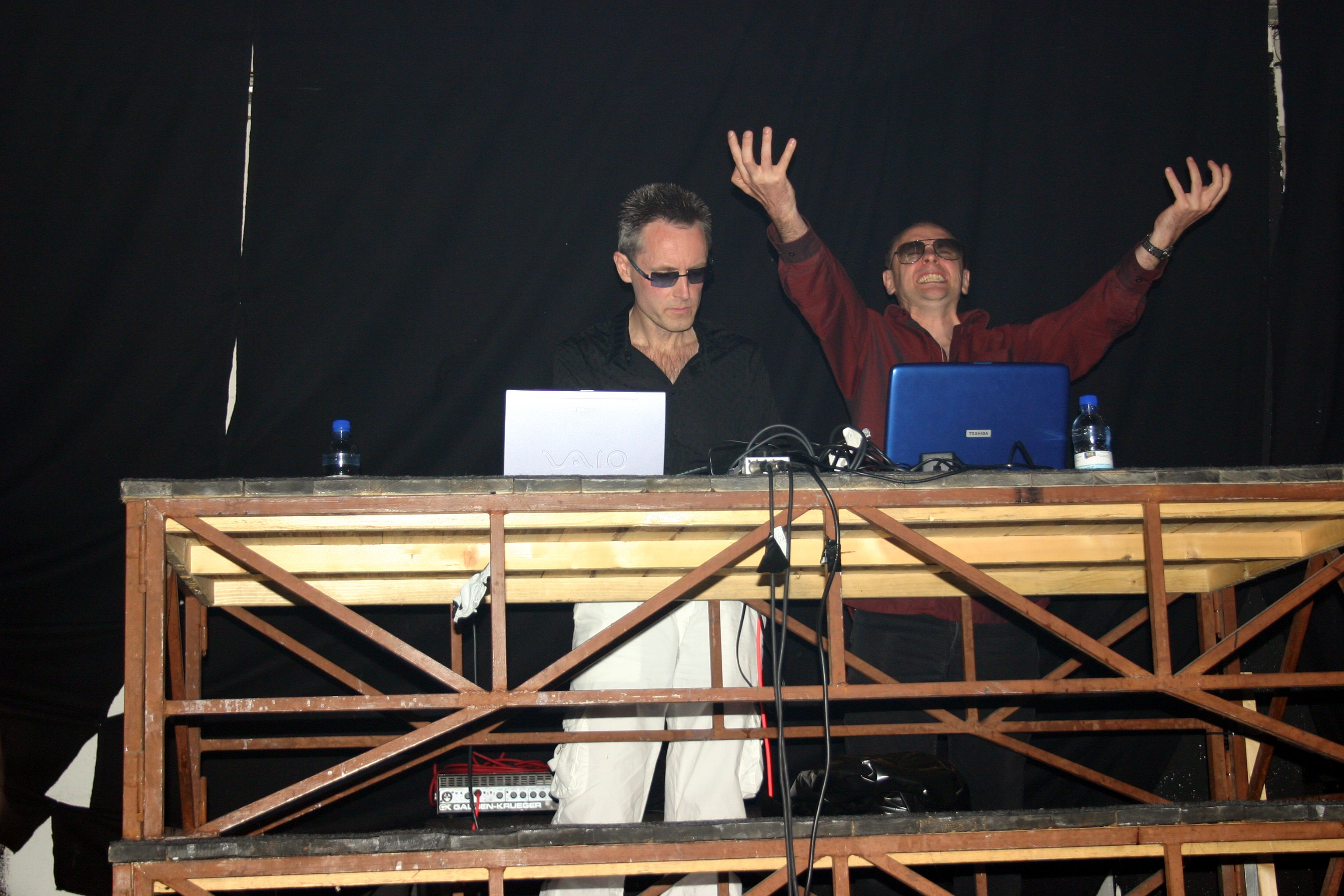
- Live at 2006's Consumer Electronics Festival. Pictured is William Bennett (left) and Philip Best.

Background information
- Origin: United Kingdom
- Genres: Power electronics; industrial; dark ambient; noise; experimental; avant-garde
- Years active: 1980–2008
- Labels: Come Organisation; Susan Lawly; Ramleh
- Members: William Bennett; Philip Best
- Past members: Peter Sotos; Kevin Tomkins; Glenn Michael Wallis; Peter McKay; Paul Reuter; John Murphy

Whitehouse were an English noise music band formed in 1980. The group is largely credited for the founding of the power electronics genre. Whitehouse was founded by vocalist William Bennett and ended as a duo consisting of Bennett and electronics player Philip Best; however, the group is perhaps best recognized for their 20-year tenure as a three-piece with synth player Peter Sotos, who joined the band in 1983 and left in 2003.

== History and personnel ==
The name Whitehouse was chosen both in mock tribute to the British morality campaigner Mary Whitehouse and in reference to a British pornographic magazine of the same name.

The group's founding member and sole constant was William Bennett. He began as a guitarist for Essential Logic. He wrote of those early years, "I often fantasised about creating a sound that could bludgeon an audience into submission." Bennett later recorded as Come (featuring contributions from the likes of Daniel Miller and J. G. Thirlwell) before forming Whitehouse in 1980. Bennett's first release as Whitehouse was Birthdeath Experience, released on his own Come Organisation label, which was immediately followed by the album Total Sex.

In 1981, Bennett released Erector, which was pressed on red vinyl and packaged in a shiny black sleeve with a photocopied picture of a penis. Erector deviated from the first two releases in experimenting with subsonic frequencies and contrasting low synth drones overlain with high-pitched screeches.

The group began performing live in 1982, with members Andrew McKenzie (The Hafler Trio) and Steven Stapleton (Nurse With Wound). In 2009, Bennett claimed that his pre-eminent inspiration was Yoko Ono: "Yoko's amazing music was by far the biggest influence on me, and Whitehouse, in the formative years (despite what some would have you believe)."

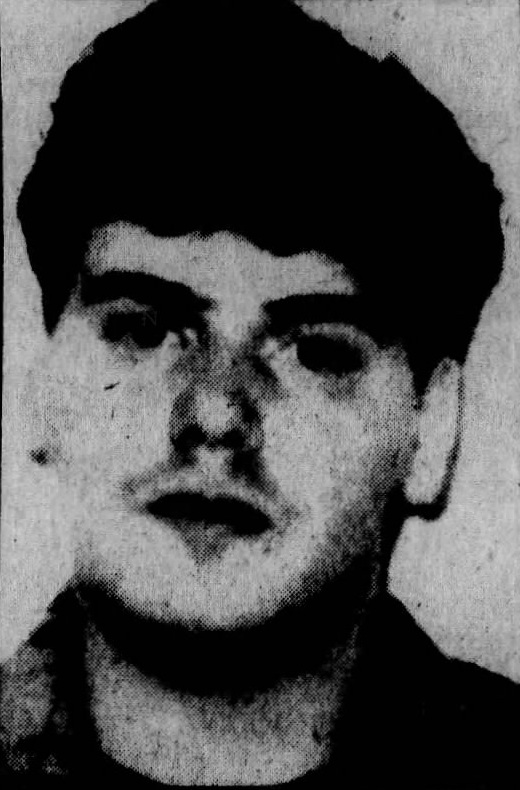
Former member Peter Sotos in 1985

Philip Best joined the group in 1982 at the age of 16, after running away from home. He was a member on and off ever since.

The group was inactive for the second half of the 1980s. A "special biographical note" on the Susan Lawly website states, "All members of Whitehouse went to live outside London for varying reasons and pursued separate lives. There was a feeling in the group that all that could be achieved had been realised."

Eventually, Whitehouse re-emerged with a series of albums, recorded by the American audio engineer, Steve Albini, beginning with 1990's Thank Your Lucky Stars. Albini worked with the band until 1998, when Bennett took over all production duties.

Through the 1990s the most stable line-up was Bennett, Best, and the writer Peter Sotos. Sotos left in 2002, leaving the band as a two-piece.

The band had numerous other members in the 1980s including Kevin Tomkins, Steven Stapleton, Glenn Michael Wallis, John Murphy, Stefan Jaworzyn, Jim Goodall and Andrew McKenzie, though many of these participated only at live performances, not on recordings.

Bennett terminated Whitehouse in 2008 to concentrate on his newly founded Cut Hands project. He also has found success as an Italo disco DJ under the name "DJ Benetti".

In 2026 the lineup of Bennett and Best was announced to be reuniting as part of the 2027 Never Surrender / Hospital Fest Volume II in Osaka, Japan.

== Music ==
Whitehouse specialized in self-described "extreme electronic music". They were known for their controversial lyrics and imagery, which portrayed sadistic sex and rape through the point of view of notorious serial killers such as Peter Kurten and Dennis Andrew Nilsen. Later works explored the psychology of eating disorders and child abuse amongst other forms of violence and abjection.

Whitehouse emerged as earlier industrial acts such as Throbbing Gristle and SPK were pulling back from noise and extreme sounds and embracing relatively more conventional musical genres. In opposition to this trend, Whitehouse wanted to take these earlier groups' sounds and fascination with extreme subject matter even further; as referenced on the sleeve of their first LP, the group wished to "cut pure human states" and produce "the most extreme music ever recorded". In doing so, they drew inspiration from some earlier experimental musicians and artists such as Alvin Lucier, Robert Ashley, and Yoko Ono as well as writers such as Marquis de Sade.

Whitehouse's early records heavily involved the use of the EDP Wasp synthesizer. The signature sonic elements included simple pulverizing electronic bass tones twinned with needling high frequencies, sometimes combined with ferocious washes of white noise, with or without vocals (usually aggressive frenzied screams alongside sinister whispers). In a 1990 interview, Bennett recalled: "I remember seeing an issue of that punk fanzine Sniffin' Glue and it said that all you needed to make music was to learn three chords, and I thought why do you even need to know three chords to make music? Why do you even need to use a guitar? The idea of thunderous extreme noises appealed to me."

Beginning on the controversial 1998 release Mummy and Daddy, the band phased out the analog equipment responsible for their prior sound, instead relying more heavily on computers. From 2003 onward, they began incorporating percussive rhythms of African instruments such as the djembe, both sampled and performed in-studio.

On November 29, 2008, a YouTube video titled "Whitehouse - Why You Never Became A Dancer" was uploaded. The video featured an image of Reiko Takemura, one of Kiyoshi Ōkubo's victims, edited to move in a disturbing manner while the song "Why You Never Became a Dancer" from the Whitehouse album Bird Seed played in the background. The video sparked a search for the identity of the woman, and in 2023, a Reddit post traced the image to a book about Ōkubo's crimes and identified the woman in the video as Takemura.

== Reception and influence ==
Whitehouse were a key influence in the development of noise music as a musical genre in Europe, Japan, the US, and elsewhere. The early music of Whitehouse is often credited with pioneering the power electronics genre (a term Bennett himself coined on the blurb to the Psychopathia Sexualis album) and noise genres.

Alternative Press included Whitehouse in their 1996 list of 100 underground inspirations of the past 20 years, opining that "many will argue [Whitehouse] have beaten Throbbing Gristle at their own game."

The band's 2003 album Bird Seed was given an 'honourable mention' in the digital musics category of Austria's annual Prix Ars Electronica awards.

As Nick Cain of The Wire put it,

By the end of the 1990s, power electronics was in a deep freeze. Fast forward a decade, and ... Whitehouse ... were enjoying an unlikely vogue, universally hailed by Noise makers from Peter Rehberg to Wolf Eyes ... and their work officially inducted into the avant garde canon through a collaboration with the German New Music ensemble Zeitkratzer.

== Discography ==
=== Studio albums ===
- Birthdeath Experience (1980)
- Total Sex (1980)
- Erector (1981)
- Dedicated to Peter Kürten (1981)
- Buchenwald (1981)
- New Britain (1982)
- Psychopathia Sexualis (1982)
- Right to Kill (1983)
- Great White Death (1985)
- Thank Your Lucky Stars (1990)
- Twice Is Not Enough (1992)
- Never Forget Death (1992)
- Halogen (1994)
- Quality Time (1995)
- Mummy and Daddy (1998)
- Cruise (2001)
- Bird Seed (2003)
- Asceticists 2006 (2006)
- Racket (2007)

=== Live albums ===
- Tokyo Halogen (1995)

=== Compilation albums ===
- Cream of the Second Coming (1990)
- Another Crack of the White Whip (1991)
- The Sound of Being Alive (2016)

=== Split albums ===
- The 150 Murderous Passions (1981)

=== Singles ===
- "Thank Your Lucky Stars" (1988)
- "Still Going Strong" (1991)
- "Just Like a Cunt" (1996)
- "Cruise (Force the Truth)" (2001)
- "Wriggle Like a Fucking Eel" (2002)
