= Philip Best =

British musician and author

- Born: 15 June 1966 (age 60)
- Occupations: Experimental musician; industrial musician; author; artist
- Years active: 1982–present

Philip Neil Best (born 15 June 1966) is an English industrial musician, visual artist, and author. A pioneer of power electronics, he formed the band Consumer Electronics in 1982.

Best joined the group Whitehouse in 1983. After a nine-year hiatus starting in 1984, Best rejoined and remained with the group until departing again in 2008.

== Career ==
=== Music ===
In the early 1980s, Best also ran his own DIY label Iphar, releasing compilations of power electronics. Through the circulation of these controversial cassettes he succeeded in promoting the burgeoning extreme noise genre. Among these cassette releases were On to 83, with Gary Mundy. Torture Music by Iphar Clinic, a solo project, and White Power, a fake neo-Nazi compilation album with artists such as Maurizio Bianchi, Sutcliffe Jugend, and Best's other project with Mundy, Consumer Electronics.

Best has been a frequent collaborator with Gary Mundy on projects such as Ramleh and Skullflower. In 1995, under the Consumer Electronics moniker, Best joined forces with Japanese noise musician Masami Akita – along with several Ramleh cohorts – to release Horn of the Goat.

Best continues to tour and release music as Consumer Electronics. The current line up includes Best, Russell Haswell and Best's wife Sarah Froelich. Their most recent LP, Airless Space was released by Harbinger Sound in 2019.

Philip Best discography
Date	Title	Project	Label
1982	Public Attack 3	Consumer Electronics	(Not on label)
1982	Leathersex	Consumer Electronics	Iphar
1983	On To 83	Male Rape Group	Broken Flag, Iphar
1995	Horn Of The Goat	Consumer Electronics / Merzbow	Freek Records
2007	Nobody's Ugly	Consumer Electronics	No Fun Productions
2009	Crowd Pleaser	Consumer Electronics	Hand To Mouth
2014	Estuary English	Consumer Electronics	Dirter Promotions
2015	Dollhouse Songs	Consumer Electronics	Harbinger Sound
2019	Airless Space	Consumer Electronics	Harbinger Sound

=== Writing ===
In 1998, Best completed a PhD in English Literature at Durham University with a thesis entitled Apocalypticism in the Fiction of William S. Burroughs, J. G. Ballard and Thomas Pynchon.

In 2016, a 60-page chapbook of writings by Best was published by Amphetamine Sulphate.

=== Art ===
In 2010, a collection of Best's artwork entitled American Campgrounds was published by Creation Books, with a foreword written by Peter Sotos.

In December 2016, Infinity Land Press published Alien Existence, a book of over 200 colour reproductions of original artwork by Best, as well as 40 pages of his creative writings, and an extensive interview conducted by Martin Bladh.
