= Come Organisation =

British record label

- Founded: 1979
- Founder: William Bennett
- Defunct: 1985
- Genre: Industrial, avant-garde, power electronics, noise
- Country of origin: United Kingdom
- Location: London, England

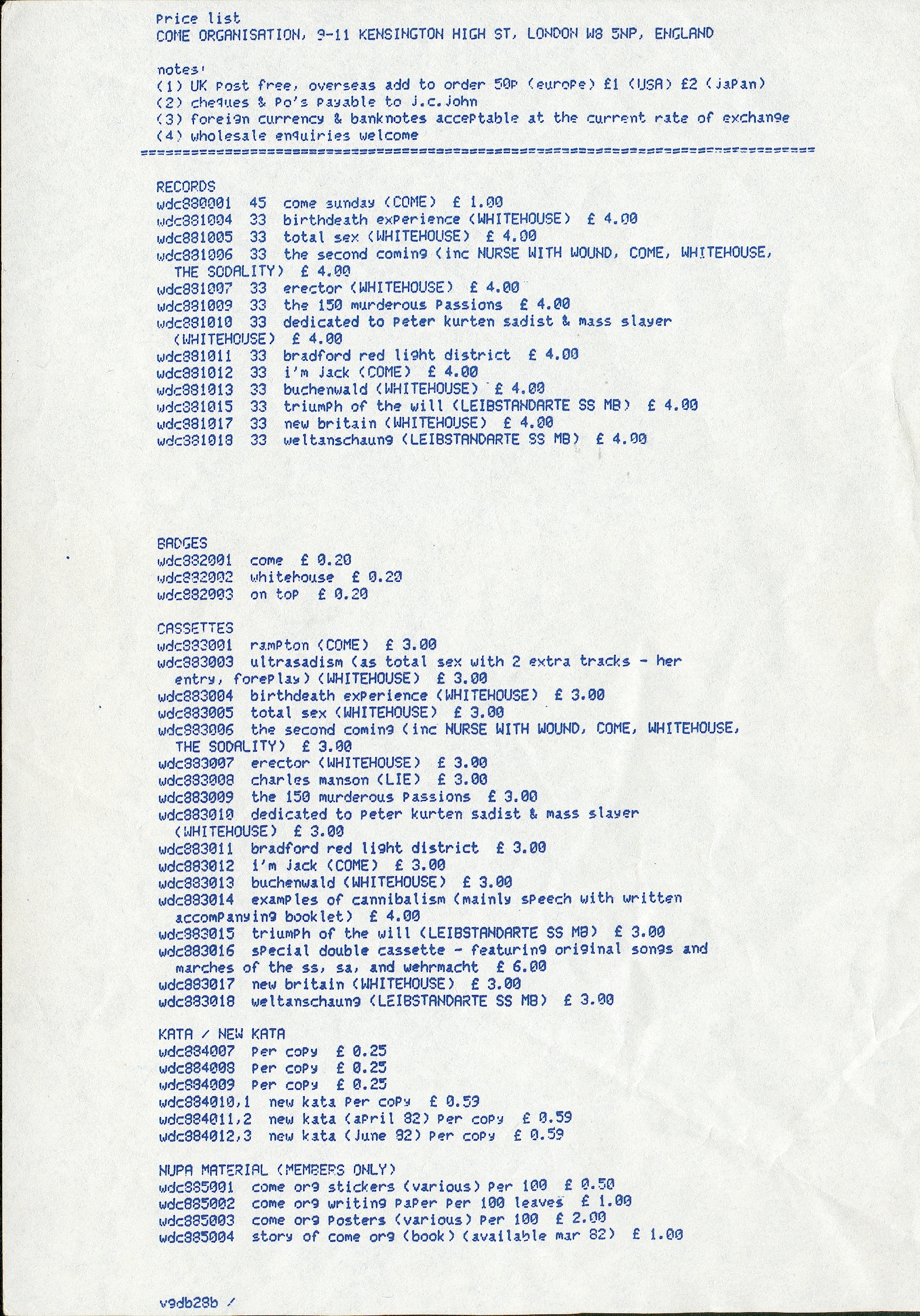
Come Org 1982 pricelist

Come Organisation was a record label started by William Bennett in 1979 as a way to release albums by his own band, Come, when he was unable to find a label willing to release them. It released the work of Bennett's subsequent band, Whitehouse.

The label's first release was the Come single "Come Sunday/Shaved Slits" in 1979. When Bennett dissolved Come in 1980 to form Whitehouse, Come Organisation continued to release his work, serving as the label for all of Whitehouse's albums from its inception through 1985's Great White Death. In addition, Bennett began to release albums by other controversial or extreme groups, including Sutcliffe Jugend, Maurizio Bianchi, Nurse With Wound and even Charles Manson.

When Whitehouse went on hiatus at the end of 1985, Come Organisation was dissolved. Bennett again created a label for his releases in 1988, but called it Susan Lawly rather than reviving Come Organisation.

== Catalog ==
See the Come Organisation discography for further information. Some artists with work on the label include:

- Charles Manson
- Come
- Dennis Andrew Nilsen
- Ed Kemper
- Leibstandarte SS MB
- Leni Riefenstahl
- Nurse With Wound
- Whitehouse

== See also ==
- Lists of record labels
