= George Peckham =

English record engineer also known as Porky (born 1942)

George "Porky" Peckham (born 29 October 1942) is an English mastering engineer. He has been responsible mastering projects for artists across genres such as Led Zeppelin, King Crimson, John Lennon as well as artists such as Underworld.

His master discs, and the records that were produced from them, often bear either the motto "A Porky Prime Cut" or a cryptic or humorous comment, etched onto the run-out grooves in his handwriting. Other inscriptions attributed to him include "Pecko" and "Pecko Duck".

One of his most technically demanding achievements was the so-called "three-sided" album, The Monty Python Matching Tie and Handkerchief (1973), mastered with two concentric grooves on side two, so that different material would be played depending on where the stylus was put down on the record's surface.

== Biography ==
Peckham was born in Blackburn, Lancashire and brought up in Liverpool. In school, he formed a band with friends called The Renegades, where he played guitar. The band later also enrolled his younger brother Derek on the bass guitar. Peckham started dabbling with audio electronics when he had to build a bass amplifier for Derek. According to Peckham, The Renegades played support to the Beatles, then an up-and-coming band. Paul McCartney, whose bass amplifier had failed, borrowed Derek's and afterwards offered to buy it.

Peckham later played and toured with The Pawns, which he knew from the music circuit, and the group recorded sessions for Decca. After a stint playing in Germany, Peckham returned to Britain, and was asked to join Billy Kelly's group, Earl Royce & The Olympics. Peckham was poached from Royce to join the Fourmost, where he replaced Mike Millward, who had health issues.

Keen on the recording side of the business, he joined Apple Studios when the Beatles acquired the property at 3 Savile Row where they would open their own studio. Peckham started his career in acetate disc cutting at Apple Studios in November 1968 before assuming the chief role there a year later. Whilst working at Apple, he began adding short messages on the run-out grooves of records he mastered. The messages, along with the phrase "A Porky Prime Cut", become his professional signature.

After various stints at other studios he established Porky's Mastering Services where he was responsible for cutting some of the most influential English records during the 1980s. This continued into the 1990s as dance music artists and labels such as No U-Turn Records also looked to his acetate cutting skills.
