= Peter Sotos =

American writer and musician (born 1960)

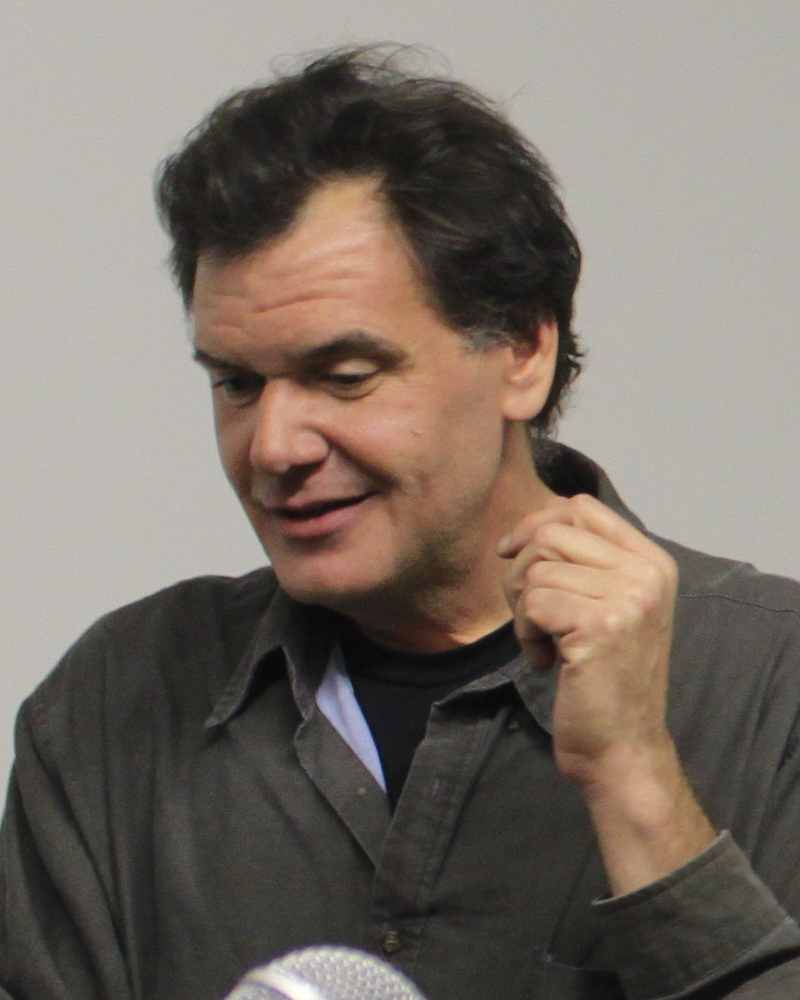
- Sotos in 2011
- Born: Peter Gus Sotos; April 17, 1960 (age 66); Chicago, Illinois, United States
- Occupations: Author; musician; visual artist

Peter Gus Sotos (born April 17, 1960) is an American author and musician. As an author, Sotos has 31 published books with several translated into foreign languages. In his books, Sotos writes about sadistic sexual criminals and sexually violent pornography in great detail, particularly involving children. His books tend to be first-person narratives, taking on the point of view of the sexual predator in order to portray sadistic and pedophilic sexual impulses.

Though controversial, his writings have been seen by some as potent social criticism highlighting the often hypocritical ways in which media deals with these issues. As a musician, Sotos is well known as a former member of the British noise music band Whitehouse. Sotos was arrested in 1985 on child pornography charges due to content that was published within an issue of his zine Pure.

== Career ==
In 1984, Sotos self-published a newsletter or "fanzine" named Pure, notable as the first zine dedicated to serial killer lore. Sotos was interviewed by Paul Lemos about Pure for Adam Parfrey's 1987 book Apocalypse Culture. After not writing for almost a decade, Sotos self-published 20 issues of Parasite from 1993 to 1995. Sotos had his first books published in 1998 – Index and Special. The following year he wrote Lazy, which examines the public fascination with sex crimes and their influence on art works such as the painting Myra by Marcus Harvey. He followed that with Selfish, Little in 2004, which recounts the murder of Lesley Ann Downey by British Moors murderers Ian Brady and Myra Hindley in 1964.

From 1983 to 2003, Sotos was a member of the British power electronics trio Whitehouse. During performances in America, Europe, and Japan, he performed using an EDP WASP synthesizer. In 1992, Sotos released the solo album Buyer's Market, which consisted of sound collages of spoken word samples from parents, law enforcement officers, and victims of sex crimes which included child sexual abuse. Sotos also released Proxy and Waitress. In 1999, Sotos contributed spoken word to a track by the band Chthonic Force, for a split 7" vinyl single. The track was later released on a "best of" Chthonic Force compilation in 2020. Peter Sotos also makes video collages. He notably presented Waitress I, II, and III at the Palais de Tokyo in April 2005.

In 2005, Sotos published two books; Predicate and Comfort and Critique. Predicate explores the Dunblane massacre in Scotland in 1996 and the motives and life of its perpetrator, Thomas Watt Hamilton. Other topics covered within Predicate include Operation Ore, Operation Cathedral, Russian orphanages, Megan's Law, and non-nude teen websites. In Comfort and Critique, Sotos explores the hidden motives of reporters and citizens as shown by their reactions to sexual crimes. He followed that with Show Adult in 2007, which investigates the experience of pornography. The book also analyzes the TV shows Supernanny and To Catch a Predator as publicly acceptable forms of child pornography. In 2008, Sotos dealt with sex offenders and the art of photography in the book Lordotics. Sotos wrote Pure Filth in 2012, which details transcripts of the gonzo movies porn star Jamie Gillis produced during the 1990s. Gillis added an introduction to each transcript. The book was completed a few days before Gillis died in February 2010. In 2012, Sotos joined Dennis Cooper for a lecture at the Centre Pompidou. He was set to give a reading at Pitchfork's BasilicaSoundScape festival at the Basilica Hudson in 2013. In 2014, he focused on the works of French photographer Antoine D'Agata in the book Desistance.

In 2018, Sotos wrote Ingratitude, which through the revisitation of a kept file of newspaper clippings, blended formative personal history with an exacting analysis of criminal and victim case reports to render a pornographically freighted study of sexual compulsion and desistance, restitution, and the perpetual churn of memory. 2021 saw Sotos join with Lionel Maunz in a collaboration with the titular contemporary artist. He wrote an afterword to the Feral House book The Gates of Janus, written by child murderer Ian Brady.

== Personal life ==
Sotos cites radical feminist Andrea Dworkin and French writer Marquis de Sade as his main literary influences.

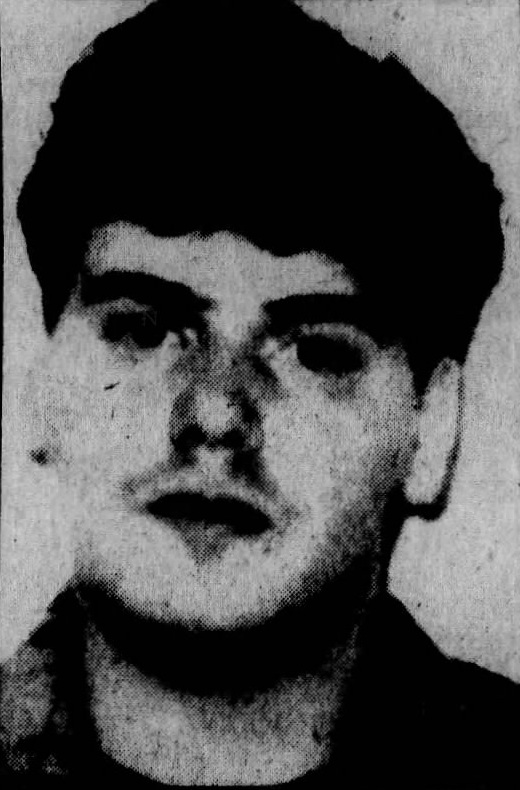
Sotos after his 1985 arrest

=== Legal issues ===
In 1984, while the day-care sex-abuse hysteria phenomenon was sweeping the nation and while attending the School of the Art Institute of Chicago, Sotos began producing the controversial magazine Pure, notable as the first zine dedicated to serial killer lore. The original publications are now collector's items.

In addition to offering many details about the crimes of serial killers and pedophiles, the text in the magazine praises them, describing them using such terms as "genius," "glorious," "exemplary," and "illustrious" and stating that child abuse is a "sublime pleasure." The text is juxtaposed with pictures and newspaper clippings relevant to the crimes discussed. A short manifesto introducing the first issue says the magazine "satiates and encourages true lusts."

A photocopy from a magazine of child pornography was used as the cover of issue #2 of Pure, which led to Sotos pleading guilty to possession of child pornography in 1985 and receiving a suspended sentence. A copy of the magazine was found by Scotland Yard in Edinburgh, in the home of a suspect in a series of child abductions, murders, and grave robberies, which led to Sotos' arrest. Sotos' case (combined with other defendants' cases) was appealed to the Supreme Court of Illinois. The appeal was denied.

== Influence ==
Steve Albini, who produced the album Buyer's Market for Sotos, described Sotos as a friend and a former influence while speaking to MEL Magazine in 2021. He said, "A lot of his writing is extremely difficult to read. It's repellent. You're brought into the mind of a sadist, pretty convincingly. And I feel like that experience, reading that stuff, is shocking to your core in the way that the horrors of the reality of those things should be." Jamie Stewart from Xiu Xiu has mentioned Sotos as an influence.

== Works ==
- Pure (1984–1985). Self-published and released two issues, with a third having been completed before controversy of publication led to a now-infamous trial.
- Parasite (1993–1995). Self-published twenty issues.
- Total Abuse: Collected Writings, 1984–1995: Pure, Tool, Parasite (1995, Goad to Hell Enterprises, ISBN 1-111-17832-1)
- Index (1996, Printed in 1998; Creation Books, ISBN 978-1840680225)
- Special (1998, Rude Shape, ISBN 978-1890528010)
- Lazy (1999, Creation Books, ISBN 978-1840680102). Examines the public fascination with sex crimes and their influence on art works such as the painting Myra by Marcus Harvey.
- Tick (2000, Creation Books, ISBN 978-1840680485)
- Selfish, Little: The Annotated Lesley Ann Downey (2004, Void Books, ISBN 978-0977799510). Recounts the murder of Lesley Ann Downey by British Moors Murderers Ian Brady and Myra Hindley in 1964.
- Proxy: Peter Sotos Pornography 1991–2000 (2005, Creation Books, ISBN 978-1840680805). A compendium of five of Sotos' works (Tool, Special, Tick, Index and Lazy). First edition, with CD by Sotos and Steve Albini.
- Comfort and Critique (2005, Void Books, ISBN 978-1616583484). Explores the hidden motives of reporters and citizens as shown by their reactions to sexual crimes.
- Predicate (2005, Creation Books, ISBN 978-1840681369). Explores the Dunblane massacre in Scotland in 1996 and the motives and life of its perpetrator, Thomas Watt Hamilton. Other topics covered include Operation Ore, Operation Cathedral, Russian orphanages, Megan's Law, and non-nude teen websites.
- Waitress (2005, Creation Books). Came as an extra for those who preordered a copy of Predicate from Creation Books.
- Show Adult (2007, Creation Books, ISBN 978-1840681499). Investigates the experience of pornography. The book also analyzes the TV shows Supernanny and To Catch a Predator as publicly acceptable forms of child pornography.
- Waitress (2007, Creation Books). Separate volume from the one included with Predicate. Came with orders of Show Adult in hardcover.
- Lordotics (2008, Creation Books, ISBN 978-1840681529). Deals with sex offenders and the art of photography
- Perfect: The Collected Peter Sotos Volume One, 2009 (Creation Books, ISBN 978-1840681550)
- Waitress (2009, Creation Books). Third in a series of additional material offered in limited editions from Creation. Came with pre orders of Perfect.
- Public: The Collected Peter Sotos Volume Two, 2009 (Creation Books, ISBN 978-1840681574)
- Waitress (2009, Creation Books) Fourth in a series of additional material offered in limited editions from Creation. Came with pre orders of Public.
- Private: The Collected Peter Sotos Volume Three, 2009 (Creation Books, ISBN 978-1840681581)
- Waitress (2009, Creation Books). Fifth in a series of additional material offered in limited editions from Creation. Came with pre orders of Private.
- Kept: The Collected Peter Sotos Volume Four, 2010 (Creation Books, ISBN 978-1840681642)
- Waitress (2010, Creation Books). Sixth in a series of additional material offered in limited editions from Creation. Came with pre orders of Kept.
- Mine (2011, Creation Books, reprinted in paperback by Nine-Banded Books in 2013, ISBN 978-0578112336)
- Pure Filth (2012, Feral House, ISBN 978-1936239313), with Jamie Gillis. Details transcripts of the gonzo movies Gillis produced during the 1990s. Gillis adds an introduction to each transcript. Completed a few days before Gillis died in February 2010.
- Tool (2013, Nine-Banded Books, ISBN 978-1616583491). First printing as a stand-alone volume.
- Home (2013, Kiddiepunk), with images by Michael Salerno.
- Desistance (2014, Nine-Banded Books, ISBN 978-0989697279). The book is focused on the works of French photographer Antoine D'Agata.
- Ingratitude (2018, Nine-Banded Books, ISBN 978-0990733584)
- Lionel Maunz Peter Sotos (2021, Nine-Banded Books & Amphetamine Sulphate, ISBN 978-1953559883), is a collaboration with the titular contemporary artist.
- Missed. Better Still. (2022, Amphetamine Sulphate, ISBN 978-1953559104). A collection of excerpts from Sotos's bibliography from 1996 onwards.
- 1. Obviates: Predicate, Show Adult (2004–2006) (2023, Amphetamine Sulphate, ISBN 978-1953559159). A compendium of two long out-of-print books.
- Kee MacFarlane (2024, Nine-Banded Books). Largely an analysis of the work of Vanessa Place.
- Instead Indices (2026, Nine-Banded Books)

== Discography ==
Year	Album name	Album details
1992	Buyer's Market	Label: AWB Recording; Format: CD
2005	Proxy	Label: Creation Books; Format: CD
2005	Waitress	Label: Creation Books; Format: CD
