= Power electronics (music genre) =

Music genre

- Other names: Heavy electronics
- Stylistic origins: Industrial; noise
- Cultural origins: Late 1970s to early 1980s, United Kingdom
- Typical instruments: Synthesizer; audio feedback

Fusion genres
- Death industrial

Power electronics (also known as heavy electronics) is a subgenre of noise and industrial music, characterized by static, screeching waves of feedback, analogue synthesizers, sub-bass pulses and high frequency squealing sounds.

== Etymology and characteristics ==
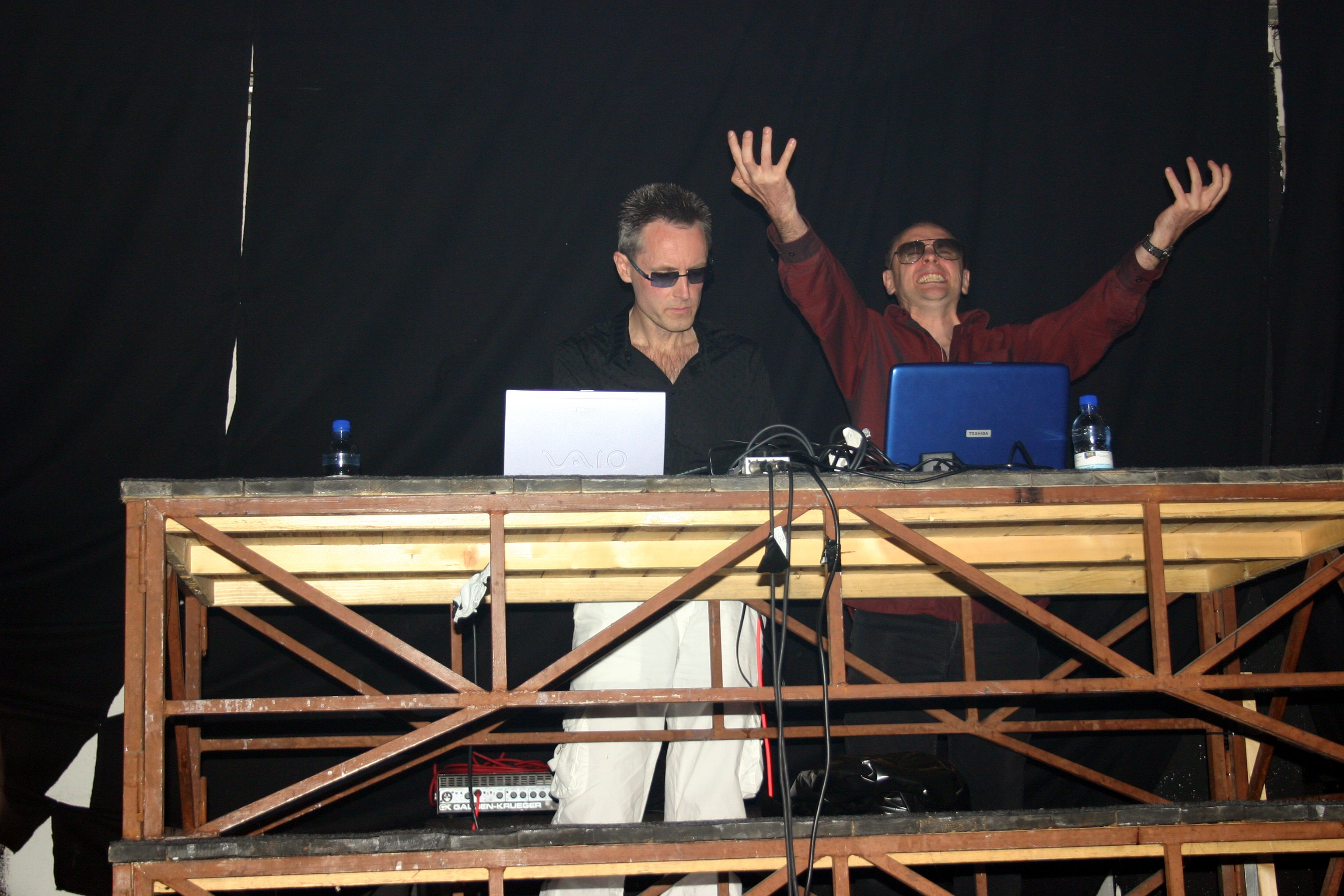
English noise band Whitehouse are credited with pioneering power electronics

The name of the genre was coined by William Bennett of Whitehouse as part of the sleeve notes to their 1982 album Psychopathia Sexualis. Tellus Audio Cassette Magazine produced a compilation compact cassette tape called Power Electronics in 1986 that was curated by Joseph Nechvatal.

Power electronics is generally atonal and, like most noise music, features a lack of conventional melody or rhythm. To match its sonic excess, it often includes thematic and visual content that might be considered extreme, whether in lyrics, artwork, or live performance. The genre sometimes involves screamed, distorted vocals, alongside the use of analogue synthesizers, and static screeches of feedback. It has been known to invite visceral reactions from both listeners and critics. Power electronics is related to the early Industrial Records scene, but later releases had more in common with noise music.

== Related genres ==
=== Death industrial ===
Death industrial (also known as dark noise) is a subgenre of power electronics characterized by a dense atmosphere, low-end drones, harsh loops and screamed and/or distorted vocals. It can be differentiated from power electronics by a slower, more atmospheric and less abrasive sound reminiscent of dark ambient. Notable acts described as death industrial include Brighter Death Now, Atrax Morgue and Genocide Organ.

== See also ==
- EAI
- Experimental music
- Sonology
- Post-Industrial music
