= Cadaverous Condition =

Austrian extreme metal band

- Origin: Graz, Austria
- Genres: Death metal, folk metal, death/doom
- Years active: 1990–present
- Labels: Lethal Records, Serpent Qui Danse, Teutonic Existence, Perverted Taste, Oak Knoll, Fuck Off & Di, Klanggalerie, Starry
- Members: Wolfgang Weiss; René Kramer; Peter Droneberger; Paul Droneberger
- Past members: Jürgen Weinhofer; Manfred Bayer; Klaus Gaischeg
- Website: www.cadaverouscondition.com

Cadaverous Condition are an extreme metal band from Austria, founded in 1990 by René Kramer and Wolfgang Weiss. Their style ranges from old school death metal to acoustic guitar songs with typical death metal growl vocals the band themselves describe as "Death Folk".

== Members ==
- Wolfgang Weiss
- René Kramer
- Peter Droneberger
- Paul Droneberger

== Discography ==
=== Albums ===
- In Melancholy (1993)
- "For Love" I Said (1995)
- The Lesser Travelled Seas (2001)
- To The Night Sky (2006)
- Burn Brightly Alone (2011)
- Never Arrive, Never Return (2024)

=== Live albums ===
- Live (2002, CDr)

=== Compilations ===
- Nostalgia (diary 1990-1999) (2001, tape)
- The Past Is Another Country (2004, CDr)
- Songs For The Crooked Path (2007)

=== Splits ===
- Tryst (1997, split CD with Todd Dillingham)
- Time (2004, split 10" vinyl with CHANGES)

=== EPs ===
- Eisbär 90210 (1995, CD EP)
- What The Waves Were Always Saying (2003, CDr)

=== Remix album / Collaboration ===
- Destroying The Night Sky (2008, remix album featuring Thighpaulsandra, Andrew Liles, Nocturnal Emissions, Product 8, Colin Potter, Nurse with Wound, Gjöll, Holy McGrail, Asmus Tietchens, Controlled Bleeding, Ali Helnwein)
