= Rapoon =

British experimental and ambient music project

- Origin: Newcastle upon Tyne, England
- Genres: Ambient; Electronic; Experimental
- Years active: 1992–present
- Labels: Staalplaat; Soleilmoon; Ewers Tonkunst; Lens; Aquarellist; Relapse
- Spinoff of: Zoviet France
- Members: Robin Storey
- Website: rapoon.org

Rapoon is a musical project of Robin Storey, a former member of Zoviet France, who has released material on notable independent labels such as Staalplaat, Soleilmoon, Manifold, Beta-Lactam Ring, and Lens Records.

Storey began Rapoon in 1992, after the break up of Zoviet France, a group that he had been with since 1980. He used Rapoon as an opportunity to explore "ethnic musics" and other techniques that he didn't feel he could explore with his former band. Storey chose the band name from a mispronunciation of his first name, "Robin", by his (then) 2-year old nephew.

Most recordings during the 1990s were released on Staalplaat and Soleilmoon, but during a tour in the United States in 1996, Storey met Matt Jacobson of Relapse Records which resulted in the release of The Fires of the Borderlands on the Relapse imprint, Release Entertainment.

== Selected discography ==
- Dream Circle, CD, 1992, DOVentertainment (DOVeCD244)
- Raising Earthly Spirits, CD, 1993, Staalplaat (S.T. CD 063); CD, 1999, Soleilmoon (SOL 65 CD)
- Vernal Crossing, CD, 1993, Staalplaat (S.T. CD 082)
- Fallen Gods, CD, 1994, Staalplaat (S.T. CD 086)
- The Kirghiz Light, 2CD, 1995, Staalplaat (S.T. CD 097)
- Recurring (Dream Circle), CD, 1996, Soleilmoon (SOL 11 CD)
- Errant Angels, CD, 1996, Soleilmoon (SOL 34 CD)
- Darker by Light, CD, 1996, Soleilmoon (SOL 36 CD)
- Easterly 6 or 7, CD, 1997, Staalplaat (S.T. CD 117)
- Messianic Ghosts, CD, 1997, Syntactic (Sophie 17) Klanggalerie (2002, gg24), Aquarellist (2011, aquarel 18-11)
- Tin of Drum, CD, 1998, Staalplaat (S.T. CD 130)
- The Fires of the Borderlands, CD, 1998, Relapse Records/Release Entertainment (RR 6978-2)
- Just Say the Faith, LP, 1998, Soleilmoon (SOLV 6); CD, 2001, Soleilmoon (SOL 107 CD)
- Navigating by Colour, CD, 1999, Soleilmoon (SOL 71 CD)
- What Do You Suppose? (The Alien Question), CD, 1999, Staalplaat (S.T. CD 141)
- Rapoon vs. Kinder Atom (with Kinder Atom), CD, 2000, Klanggalerie (gg17)
- Cold War: Drum n Bass, 2CD, 2001, Caciocavallo (CAD 7)
- Pell Mell, 2002, CD, Staalplaat (S.T. CD 155)
- Rhiz, 2002, CD, Klanggalerie (gg59)
- Tribryd Installation Soundtracks (Various Artists), 2003, CD, Beta-Lactum Ring Records
- I Am a Foreigner CD, 2003, Caciocavallo (CAD 26)
- My Life as a Ghost, 2004, CD, Klanggalerie (gg49)
- Alien Glyph Morphology DVD, 2005, Caciocavallo (CAV 30); 2x10", 2006, (CAL 30)
- Church Road CD, 2006, Tantric Harmonies (TANTRA X37)
- From Shadows Sleep, 2006, CD, Essence Music (ESS006)
- Time Frost CD, 2007, Glacial Movements (GM 003)
- Obscure Objects of Desire, 2008, CD, Vivo (vivo2008039CD)
- The Library of the Dead, 2008, CD, Ewers Tonkunst (HHE 018 CD), Indiestate Distribution (IST 059 CD)
- Dark Rivers, May 2009, CD, Lens Records (LENS0102)
- Melancholic Songs of the Desert, 2009, CD, Soleilmoon (SOL 166 CD)
- Wasteland Raga, 2009, CD, Aquarellist (aquarel 11-09)
- The Bush Prophet, 2010, CD, Ewers Tonkunst (HHE 029 CD), Indiestate Distribution (IST 079 CD)
- Media Studies, 2011, CD, Aquarellist (aquarel 17-11)
- Disappeared Redux, 2012, CD, Zoharum (ZOHAR 029-2)
- Stray, 2012, CD, Soleilmoon (SOL 181 CD)
- Cultural Forgeries, 2014, CD, Alrealon Musique (ALRN058)

== Side projects ==
- Oedipus Brain Foil 3xCD (with Randy Greif and Nigel Ayers), 1998, Soleilmoon (SOL 66 CD)
- The World Turned Gingham CD (with Nigel Ayers, released under the name Hank & Slim) (Caciocavallo, 2000)
- About Breathing CD (with Victor Nubla), 2002, Caciocavallo (CAD 24)
- New Cult of the Sun Moon 2CD (with Black Faction), 2002, Soleilmoon (SOL 122 CD)
