= Nigel Ayers =

English multimedia artist (born 1957)

Nigel Ayers (born 1957 in Tideswell, Derbyshire) is an English multimedia artist. His sound art has included numerous audio releases and live performances through his group Nocturnal Emissions.

His sound art collaborations includes work with Bourbonese Qualk, C.C.C.C., Andrew Liles, Lustmord, Randy Greif, Robin Storey, Expose Your Eyes, Stewart Home, Z'EV, and Zoviet France.

In 1979, he co-founded the record label Sterile Records with Caroline K, releasing the first records by John Balance, Maurizio Bianchi and Lustmord, among many others. In 1987 he formed the Earthly Delights (record label).

In the early 1990s, he performed live soundtracks for the Butoh performances of Poppo & the Go Go Boys. His visual art has been exhibited in the Tate, ICA, and worn by the soccer legend Diego Maradona.

In 2022, Electronic Resistance - a large format anthology of Ayers's visual work was published by Amaya Productions.

== Sound art ==
Ayers' sound art work is rooted in assemblage and collage. Years before digital sampling became commonplace, his recordings used thousands of edited "found" and specially recorded sound samples. His interest in the psychological effects of sound, and in particular the recombination of sound to affect perception of time and space is reflected in CD titles such as Practical Time Travel where sound functions as snapshots of memory forming new associations as it passes into a simulated dream world.

He is also interested in eroding the concept of individualised artistic personality using digital technologies to enable multiple authorship. This is exemplified in the remixable sound sample libraries he has released as a sound developer in the commercially released sample libraries for Sony's ACID Pro and Propellerhead's Reason (software).

In his sound installations, such as Soul Zodiac (2006) and The Planetarium Must Be Built (2007) he has explored the possibilities of digital remixes in both time and space, using everyday equipment such as multiple CD boomboxes.

== Sample libraries ==
- Myths of Technology (Sony)
- Organic Chemistry (Zero G)
- Loop Noir – Paranormal Sound Design (Sony)

== Bibliography ==
- "Sound, Health, Radio and the News" in Radiotext(e) Neil Strauss (Ed), David Mandl (Ed) (Semiotext(e) 1993) p259 ISBN 0936756942
- "Where's Wally? A personal account of a multiple-use-name entanglement" in Transgressions: A Journal of Urban Exploration #2/3 (Salamander Press, London, 1996) p89-94
- "Ludd's Measure" in Mind Invaders: A Reader in Psychic Warfare, Cultural Sabotage And Semiotic Terrorism Stewart Home Ed. (Serpent's Tail London, 1997). ISBN 978-1852425609
- Bodmin Moor Zodiac (2007).
- The Control You Gain. The Power You Rule. (2009).
- NETWORK NEWS (Nocturnal Emissions, 2009).
- Lusitania (Earthly Delights, 2010).
- S. Alexander Reed Assimilate: A Critical History of Industrial Music (Oxford University Press USA, 2013). ISBN 0199832609 ISBN 978-0199832606
- Electronic Resistance (Amaya Productions, 2021). ISBN 0578978202 ISBN 978-0578978208
