= Dara Kass =

American emergency medicine physician

- Born: Dara Ann Gitlin; September 6, 1977 (age 48); Brooklyn, NY
- Education: University of Maryland, College Park, BS, 1998; SUNY Downstate Medical Center, MD, 2003
- Known for: COVID-19 response
- Children: 3
- Scientific career
- Fields: Emergency medicine
- Workplaces: Columbia University; New York-Presbyterian Hospital
- Website: https://www.darakass.com

Dara Ann Kass (born September 6, 1977) is an American emergency medicine physician, healthcare policy consultant, and equity advocate. She is a Professor of the Practice at the Brown University School of Public Health and an attending emergency physician at NYC Health + Hospitals, Lincoln. Kass is a longtime advocate for gender equity and advancing the careers of women in medicine. During the Coronavirus disease (COVID-19) pandemic, she served as a prominent public health communicator, frequently sharing her clinical experiences after contracting the virus. Following the Dobbs v. Jackson Women's Health Organization Supreme Court decision, her work has focused extensively on reproductive healthcare policy and protecting access to sterilizing care within the emergency department setting.

== Early life and education ==
Kass was born and raised in Brooklyn, New York. Inspired by her mother, who worked as an emergency medicine nurse at Brookdale Hospital, she pursued a career in medicine. She attended the University of Maryland, College Park, receiving a Bachelor of Science degree in neurobiology and physiology in 1998. She earned her Doctor of Medicine degree from SUNY Downstate Medical School in 2003, and subsequently completed her residency training at SUNY Downstate Kings County Hospital from 2003 to 2007.

== Clinical and Academic Career ==
Kass began her post-residency career as an attending physician at Staten Island University Hospital from 2007 to 2013, where she assisted in establishing the hospital's emergency medicine residency program. In 2013, she joined the faculty at NYU Langone Medical Center, serving as the director of undergraduate medical education and managing medical school programs within the emergency department at Bellvue Hospital.

From 2018 until 2021, Kass served as an Associate Professor and Director of Equity and Inclusion for the Emergency Department at the Columbia University Irving Medical Center. Following her period of federal public service, she returned to clinical practice in New York City as an attending emergency physician at NYC Health + Hospitals, Lincoln Medical Center in the Bronx.

=== FemInEM and Equity Advocacy ===
In September 2015, Kass founded FemInEM, an open-access online platform and organization dedicated to supporting women in emergency medicine and advocating for gender equity. Under her leadership, the platform addressed critical workforce issues such as gender bias, pay disparities, and work-life balance, while expanding to host annual national conferences, publish research, and foster mentorship.

Beyond career advancement, FemInEM served as an educational repository for women's health. Under Kass's direction, the platform integrated a heavy focus on reproductive health education, publishing resources and clinical guidelines tailored for emergency providers. This included content designed to improve the emergency department management of complex early pregnancy complications, miscarriage care, contraception access, and intimate partner violence screening.

Kass was also a founding member of Time's Up Healthcare, an initiative established in 2019 to address sexual and gender harassment within the medical field. She has written extensively about the harassment women in medicine experience from both systemic structures and patients. In addition to equity work within her specialty, Kass collaborated with other healthcare leaders to address firearm injury prevention, co-authoring public health advocacy pieces detailing gun violence as a medical crisis.

=== COVID-19 Pandemic Response ===
While working as a frontline physician in New York City during the onset of the Covid-19 Pandemic, Kass contracted SARS-CoV-2 in March 2020. During her recovery and subsequent isolation, she utilized her public platform to highlight the systemic pressures facing emergency departments, including critical shortages of personal protective equipment (PPE) and ventilators, as well as the mental health strain on healthcare workers.

Throughout the pandemic, she appeared regularly as a medical expert on national cable news networks, including MSNBC. She was publicly critical of the Trump administration's initial handling of the crisis, citing a lack of federal coordination and insufficient response to early epidemiological warnings.

=== Government Service ===
In November 2021, Kass was appointed by the Biden administration to serve as the Regional Director for Region 2 of the U.S. Department of Health and Human Services (HHS), overseeing public health initiatives and intergovernmental affairs for New York, New Jersey, Puerto Rico, the U.S. Virgin Islands, and eight Tribal Nations. During her tenure, which lasted until 2024, she focused on federal vaccine outreach, public health communication, and explaining the healthcare benefits of the Inflation Reduction Act. Following the 2022 Dobbs decision, Kass worked within HHS to help shape federal policy protecting reproductive healthcare access.

=== Brown University and the AIM Lab ===
In 2025, Kass joined the faculty at the Brown University School of Public Health as a Professor of the Practice. She serves as the Co-Director of the Advancing Impact on Maternal and Reproductive Health (AIM) Lab alongside Liz Tobin-Tyler. The AIM Lab focuses on translating public health data and reproductive health research into actionable policy and community-level solutions, centering on protecting and optimizing reproductive care pathways and expanding strategic public health communication models.

Additionally, she serves on the board of Americans for Contraception.

== Awards and honors ==
  - Nominee, Early Faculty Award, Academy of Women in Academic Emergency Medicine (AWAEM), 2011
  - Awardee, Top Poster, Council of Residency Directors in Emergency Medicine (CORD), 2015
  - Awardee, Momentum Award, Academy of Women in Academic Emergency Medicine (AWAEM), 2015
  - Nominee, Mentor of the Year Award, American Association of Women Emergency Physicians (AAWEP), 2016
  - Awardee, Mentor of the Year Award, American Association of Women Emergency Physicians (AAWEP), 2018
  - Awardee, Advancement of Women in Academic Emergency Medicine Award, Society for Academic Emergency Medicine (SAEM), 2019
  - Awardee, Advancing Emergency Care Award, New York American College of Emergency Physicians (NYACEP), 2019
  - Awardee, EMRA 45under45, Emergency Medicine Residents' Association, 2019
  - Awardee, Willoughby Award, American College of Osteopathic Emergency Physicians (ACOEP), 2019
  - Awardee, Stand With Her Award, Champion of Women in Medicine, 2019
  - Awardee, The Tamara O’Neal Health Justice Service Award, The University of Illinois-Chicago, 2021
  - Awardee, Outstanding Mother Award, The National Mother's Day Council, 2021
  - Honoree, Jonas Salk Scholarship Awards Ceremony, City College of New York, 2022
  - Awardee, Dean's Social Mission Award, CUNY School of Medicine PA Program, 2024
  - Awardee, Ailanthus Award, SUNY Downstate College of Medicine, 2024

== Personal Life and Organ Donation Reform ==
Kass is a mother of three children: Hannah, Charlie, and Sammy. Her youngest son, Sammy, was diagnosed as an infant with alpha-1 antitrypsin deficiency, a rare genetic condition causing severely impaired liver function. When his condition worsened, Kass acted as a living donor, successfully donating a portion of her liver to him. She chronicled the experience publicly in The New York Times and other outlets to raise awareness for living organ donations. This experience led her to join the board of the non-profit organization ORGANIZE, where she works to reform, modernize, and advocate for federal policy changes to the U.S. organ donation system.
