= Richard D. Segal =

American investor and philanthropist

Richard D. Segal is an American investor and philanthropist. Segal is chairman and chief executive officer of the Seavest Investment Group, a private investment firm with holdings in both venture capital and managed real estate. He also serves as chairman and co-founder of Rethink Capital Partners, a venture capital firm that invests in technological solutions providing social impact to local and global communities.

Segal founded Seavest in 1981. In 2001, the firm narrowed its real estate activities to focus on the acquisition, development, and management of out-patient medical facilities, operating under its Seavest Healthcare Properties subsidiary. He launched Seavest's venture arm Rethink VC in 2012 to invest in early- and growth-stage companies with an impact lens primarily in the education, healthcare, environmental sustainability, and financial inclusion.

Segal previously served as chairman of the board of directors of SchoolNet Inc., a provider of software solutions for public school systems that was acquired by Pearson in 2011 for $230 Million. He was also on the board of directors of Wireless Generation previous to its $400 million acquisition by NewsCorp., and of Smarterer Inc. before its acquisition by Pluralsight. He serves as chairman of the boards of BEGiN, Civitas Learning and Cinematic Healthcare Education, Inc.

== Philanthropy ==
Segal has sat on the board of trustees of New York-Presbyterian Hospital of since 2009. He also serves the New York Academy of Art, and the Whitney Museum of American Art, where he serves as treasurer.

He is also president of the A. L. Mailman Family Foundation, a charitable foundation focused on progressive advocacy and early childhood education. He is also founding chairman emeritus of Publicolor, a not-for-profit arts and education institution serving the needs of the most challenged New York City Public Schools, as well as a Trustee Emeritus of the Big Apple Circus.

Previously, Segal served as chairman of the board of Rye Country Day School in Rye, New York, as well as chairman of the board of SeriousFun, an international camp-based program established by actor Paul Newman to create positive recreational experiences for children with serious illnesses. He also formerly served as member of the board of advisors of the Nasher Museum at Duke University, having helped with the fundraising for and construction of the museum, and is a former trustee of the Neuberger Museum of Art.

== Personal life ==
He is the son of Marilyn Mailman Segal. He lives in Rye, New York with his wife, Monica. Segal graduated with a BA in English from Wesleyan University.

Segal received a heart transplant in 2009, after which his son, Greg Segal, co-founded the non-profit ORGANIZE to drive reform in the organ donation system. ORGANIZE received an Innovator in Residence position in the Office of the US Secretary of Health and Human Services and co-hosted the 2016 White House Organ Donation Summit in partnership with Obama Presidential Administration. Segal, a lifelong Boston Red Sox fan, received the honor of throwing the ceremonial first pitch at Fenway Park on August 14, 2015, as part of a Red Sox Organ Donation Awareness night.
