= ORGANIZE =

US-based non-profit organization

Organize
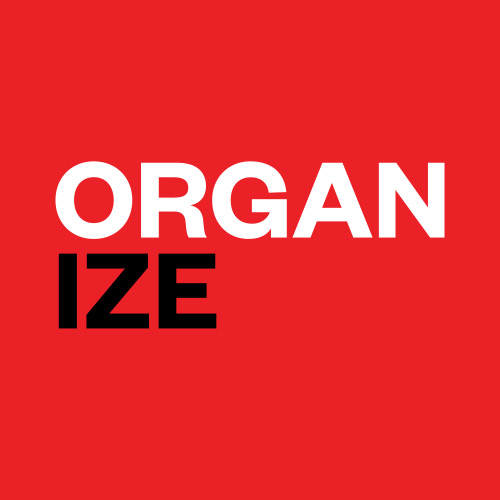
- Founder: Jenna Arnold, Greg Segal
- Board of directors: Bryan Sivan, Reggie Love, Dara Kass
- Website: www.organize.org

Organize is a US-based non-profit focused on bringing reform to the organ donation system. Organize was co-founded by Greg Segal and Jenna Arnold in late 2013 after Segal's father, Rick Segal, was forced to wait five years to undergo a heart transplant. In 2015, Organize received an Innovator in Residence position in the Office of the US Secretary of Health and Human Services and was a featured presenter the 2016 White House Organ Donation Summit.

== Awards and recognition ==
Organize has been profiled in the New York Times, Washington Post, Forbes, Slate, and Fast Company. Orrganize received the $1MM First Prize in the Verizon Powerful Answers Award, the Inaugural Stanford MedX Health Care Design Award, a Tribeca Disruptive Innovation Award, and the Classy Award as one of the top 10 social change organizations in the world. The New York Times called Organize one of 2016's "Biggest Ideas in Social Change", and Organize's co-founders have been honored in Inc Magazine's "35 Under 35 List" and Oprah's list of 100 Super Soul Influencers.
