= Time's Up =

Time's Up may refer to:

== Books ==
- Time's Up (book), a 2010 non-fiction book by Susan Murphy-Milano
- Time's Up, a novel in the Beacon Street Girls series for girls

== Music ==
- Time's Up (Living Colour album), 1990, or the title track
- Time's Up (K-Solo album), 1992
- Time's Up, by Allure, 2010
- Time's Up, by Buzzcocks, 2000
- Time's Up, by Thee Majesty, 1999
- Time's Up Live, a live DVD by Psychic TV

=== Songs ===
- "Time's Up" (Jadakiss song), 2004
- "Time's Up" (O.C. song), 1994
- "Time's Up" (Southern Pacific and Carlene Carter song), 1989
- "Time's Up", by Ashley Tisdale from her album Guilty Pleasure, 2009
- "Time's Up", by Sycco, 2021

== Organizations ==
- Time's Up!, a cycling and environmental advocacy group in New York City
- Time's Up (artist group), an interactive media and machine arts group in Linz, Austria
- Time's Up (organization), an organization of Hollywood women to support lower-income women fighting sexual abuse and harassment
- Time's Up Legal Defense Fund, an organization that provides legal and media assistance to individuals facing workplace sexual discrimination and harassment

== Other uses ==
- "Time's Up" (CSI: NY episode)
- Time's Up! (game), a commercial variant of the parlour game Celebrity

== See also ==
- Time Is Up, a 2011 album by Havok
