= Andrew Liles =

Musical artist (born 1969)

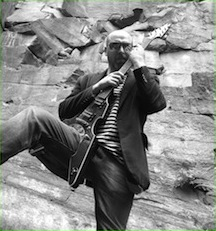

Background information
- Birth name: Andrew Liles
- Born: 11 March 1969 (age 56)
- Origin: England
- Genres: Industrial, hard rock, avant-garde, experimental, dub reggae, drone
- Years active: 2000 - Present
- Website: andrewliles.com

Andrew Liles (born 11 March 1969) is a British sound artist and multi-instrumentalist. He has released recordings since the mid-1980s, covering a variety of styles as experimental music, dark ambient music, progressive rock and hints of hard rock.

Along with his solo work he has worked with artists including Bass Communion, Steven Stapleton, Darren Tate, The Hafler Trio, Karl Blake, Faust, Unsong, Nurse With Wound, Daniel Menche, Band of Pain, Lord Bath, Sion Orgon, Andrew King, Nick Mott, Current 93, Paul Bradley, Aaron Moore, Nigel Ayers, Irr. App (Ext), Jonathan Coleclough, Tony Wakeford, Frans De Waard, Freek Kinkelaar, Danielle Dax, Rose McDowall, Edward Ka-spel, Kommissar Hjuler & Mama Baer, Vidna Obmana, ruse (British artist) and Ernesto Tomasini.

== Discography ==
=== Releases ===
- An Un World (Infraction, 2001)
- Love Song (Macrophonies Org, 2002)
- Miscellany (Pipkin, 2002)
- All Closed Doors (Infraction, 2003)
- Anal Aura Gram (Macrophonies Org, 2003)
- Aural Anagram (Macrophonies Org, 2003)
- Interpolations (Pipkin, 2003)
- Miscellany – Deluxe (Pipkin, 2003)
- Drone Works No. 7 (Twenty Hertz, 2004)
- My Long Accumulating Discontent (Nextera, 2004)
- New York Doll (Infraction, 2004)
- The Gazogene Machines, Seidlitz Powders, Bruising Roots & Rhizomes EP (Klanggalerie, 2004)
- Vital Static (Macrophonies Org, 2004)
- Four Compositions Created for an Imaginary Performance by the Legendary John Fare (Pipkin, 2005)
- Mother & Son (Starfiresun, 2005)
- Mother Goose's Melody Or Sonnets for the Cradle (ICR, Klanggalerie, 2005)
- The Astronomical Entomologist (Beta-lactam Ring Records, 2005)
- Without Season (Twenty Hertz, 2005)
- Eggs (Important Records, 2006)
- In My Father's House Are Many Mansions (Fourth Dimension Records, 2006)
- The Astronomical Entomologist (Beta-lactam Ring Records, 2006)
- The Dead Submariner (A Concerto For Bowed Guitar And Reverberation in Three Movements) (Beta-lactam Ring Records, 2006)
- The Dying Submariner (A Concerto For Piano And Reverberation in Four Movements) (Beta-lactam Ring Records, 2006)
- The Dying Submariner (Amalgamation, Codicil And Appendix) (Beta-lactam Ring Records, 2006)
- Tubercular Bells (Somnambulance To Dream General) (Pipkin, 2006)
- Black Paper (Beta-lactam Ring Records, 2006)
- Black Beauty (Beta-lactam Ring Records, 2007)
- Black End (Beta-lactam Ring Records, 2007)
- Black Hole (Beta-lactam Ring Records, 2007)
- Black Mamba (Beta-lactam Ring Records, 2007)
- Black Market (Beta-lactam Ring Records, 2007)
- Black Out (Beta-lactam Ring Records, 2007)
- Black Panther (Beta-lactam Ring Records, 2007)
- Black Pool (Beta-lactam Ring Records, 2007)
- Black Sheep (Beta-lactam Ring Records, 2007)
- Black Widow (Beta-lactam Ring Records, 2007)
- Black Sea (Beta-lactam Ring Records, 2007)
- Iron Lung – Glass Bones (Twisted Knister, 2007)
- Torch Songs (Die Stadt, 2007)
- Auto Manipulator (1st, 2nd, 3rd, 4th, 5th, 6th, 7th & 8th Degree) (Lumberton Trading Company, 2008)
- Burn (Not on Label, 2008)
- Fini! (Dirter Promotions, 2008)
- Gone Every Evening (Die Stadt, 2008)
- No Birds Do Sing (Dirter Promotions, 2008)
- Ostinato 23 (Oral, 2008)
- Ouarda (The Subtle Art of Phyllorhodomancy) (Dirter Promotions, 2008)
- Somnambulance To Dream General (Klanggalerie, 2008)
- The Progeny of Flies (Beta-lactam Ring Records, 2008)
- Miscellany Deluxe (Souvenirs Perdus D'antan) (Vinyl on Demand, 2009)
- Anal Aura Gram(ophone) (Beta-lactam Ring Records, 2010)
- Aviatophobia (Sound of Break Up – Sound of Impact) (Not on Label, 2010)
- Monster Munch E.P. (Tourette, 2010)
- Miraculous Mechanical Monster (Dirter Promotions, 2010)
- Mind Mangled Trip Monster (Dirter Promotions, 2010)
- Honey Monster (Quasi Pop, 2010)
- As If Punk Rock Never Happened (Dirter Promotions, 2011)
- First Aid Box (Ultra Mail Prod., 2011)
- Muldjewangk, Morgawr & other Monsters (Tourette, 2011)
- Schmetaling Monster of Rock (Dirter Promotions, 2011)
- Murderers, Maniacs, Madmen & Monsters (Merzbild, 2013)

=== Remixes ===
- Bass Communion: Ghosts On Magnetic Tape (Headphone Dust, 2003)
- Nurse with Wound: Natal Moonies (track Rock'n Roll Station (Lost Bottle Mix)) (United Jnana, 2006)
- Cadaverous Condition: Destroying The Night Sky (tracks Defiled (At The Crossroads) and Degraded (Fireship)) (Klanggalerie, 2008)
- Current 93: Dawn (as Dusk) (Durtro, Jnana Records, 2008)
- Current 93: Dogs Blood Rising (as Dogs Blood Ascending) (Durtro, Jnana Records, 2008)
- Current 93: In Menstrual Night (as The End of Red Dreams) (Durtro, Jnana Records, 2008)
- Current 93: Live at Bar Maldoror (as Dead at Bar Maldoror) (Durtro, Jnana Records, 2008)
- Current 93: Nature Unveiled (as Nature Revealed) (Durtro, Jnana Records, 2008)
- Pantaleimon: Heart Of The Sun (track All The Birds (Melting Canvas)) (Durtro, Jnana Records, 2008)
- Current 93: Faust/I Have A Special Plan For This World (as Haunt Invocation (Apadno.)) (Dirter Promotions, 2010)
- Current 93: Where the long Shadows Fall (Dirter Promotions, Pipkin, 2010)
- Sutekh Hexen: Breed in Me the Darkness (Aurora Borealis, Merzbild, and Pesanta Urfolk 2013)
- Kommissar Hjuler und Frau: Commendatori/House Arrest (Psych. kg 093, 2013)

=== Mix ===
- Current 93: Birth Canal Blues (Durtro, Jnana Records, 2008)
- Current 93: Birth Canal Blues (Coptic Cat, 2008)
- Current 93: Birth Canal Blues Live (EP) (Coptic Cat, 2008)

Appears On:

- The Harbinger Of The Decaying Mind (Old Europa Cafe, 2004)
- ScatterBrain JukeBox 1 (Statutory Tape, 2005)
- The Accidental (Elsie & Jack Recordings, 2005)
- Soundpooling (ICR, 2006)
- Black Ship In The Underworld (Durtro, Jnana Records, 2007)
- Amfetamin (Cold Spring, 2008)
- Aspiring To An Empty Gesture Volume 1 (Errata In Excelsus, 2008)
- Birth Canal Blues (Durtro, Jnana Records, 2008)
- Birth Canal Blues (Coptic Cat, 2008)
- Birth Canal Blues Live (Coptic Cat, 2008)
- Huffin' Rag Blues (Dirter Promotions, 2008)
- Tall Trees (Abaton Book Company, 2008)
- The Bacteria Magnet (Dirter Promotions, 2008)
- Aleph At Hallucinatory Mountain (Coptic Cat, 2009)
- May The Fleas Of A Thousand Camels Infest Your Armpits (United Dairies, 2009)
- Monohallucinatory Mountain (Coptic Cat, 2009)
- Schiphorst 2008 (Salamanda 2009)
- The Surveillance Lounge / The Memory Surface (United Dirter, 2009)

Tracks Appear On:

- First (CD)
- A Certain Step (Operative Records, 2001)
- Il Programma Di Religione (CD)
- Benedict XV (1914–1922)
- Boyarm, (Slight Record, 2005)
- Sampler 1 Fall/Winter 2005–2006 (CDr, Smplr, Promo, Ltd)
- Journeys (Infraction, 2005)
- ScatterBrain JukeBox 1 (DVDr, DVD-V, Comp)
- Away All Boats (Extract) (Statutory Tape, 2005)
- Appliance 4 (LP)
- The Time Work Manageme... (Appliance Japan, 2006)
- Breaking Down The Barriers 1995–2005, Ten Years Of Afe (File, MP3, Comp)
- Hippopotamus (Afe Records, 2006)
- Mind The Gap Volume 63 (CD, Comp)
- Reis (Gonzo Circus, 2006)
- Swarm (2xCD, Car)
- Sea Man Or Giordano Gi... (Cold Spring, 2006)
- Danza De La Vida – Rest In Peace, Again, Syntactic (CD, Ltd)
- In This Vegetable Glas... (Klanggalerie, Syntactic, 2007)
- Mental Mood Music (CD, Smplr)
- As On A Dung Hill (Beta-lactam Ring Records, 2007)
- Moraines II (CD, Album, Car)
- Moraines (A Sysyphus E... (SmallVoices, 2007)
- Rough Trade Shops – Counter Culture 06 (2xCD, Comp, Mixed)
- Orville's Engastrimyth... (V2 Records, Inc. 2007)
- Brainwaves 2008 (3xCD, Ltd, Comp)
- Burnt (Brainwashed Recordings, 2008)
- Mind The Gap Volume 73 (CD, Comp)
- Onion Cordial (Gonzo Circus, 2008)
- Mind The Gap Volume 76 (CD, Comp)
- The Drummer Is on Valium (Gonzo Circus, 2008)
- Peace (For mother) (2xCD, Comp, Car) (Brainwashed Recordings, 2008)
- Resonant Embers (CD, Comp, Ltd)
- The Relentlessly Banal... (Edition Sonoro, 2008)
- Rough Trade Shops – Counter Culture 07 (2xCD, Comp)
- VTR (Counter Culture Records, 2008)
- Mind The Gap Volume 78 (CD, Comp)
- Swamp Thing Gonzo Mix (Gonzo Circus, 2009)
- Ød Lot (CD, Comp)
- The Tadpole Variations... (United Dairies, 2009)
- The Machine Started To Flow into A Vein (Vol.3) (CD, Comp)
- Camberwick Green (Moontrix, 2012)
