= Marilyn Mailman Segal =

American psychologist

Marilyn Mailman Segal (Marilyn Segal; died 2014) was an American developmental psychologist, author and educator specializing in early childhood. She is the founder and dean emeritus of the Family Center at Nova Southeastern University in Fort Lauderdale, Florida. Her numerous books include the five volume "Your Child at Play" series.

She received a B.A. from Wellesley College in 1948, a B.S. in social work from McGill University in 1949, and a Ph.D. in social psychology from Nova University in 1970. She established a doctoral program in early childhood education in 1972 and founded the Family Center in 1975. In 2002 it was renamed the Mailman Segal Institute for Early Childhood Studies.

Her businessman father, Abraham Mailman, was the founder of the Mailman Foundation with his brother Joseph Mailman. She is chair emeritus of the A. L. Mailman Family Foundation (named after her father) and is a trustee of the University of Miami.

A family gift of Old Master paintings to Duke University has been named in her honor. She died on November 19, 2014. Richard D. Segal is her son.

== Selected writing ==
- Marilyn Segal, Your Child at Play: Birth to One Year : Discovering the Senses and Learning About the World, (Your Child at Play Series), Newmarket Press, 2nd edition 1998 ISBN 1-55704-334-5
