= Caroline K =

English singer, songwriter and artist/producer

- Born: Caroline Kaye Walters; 1957
- Died: 12 July 2008 (aged 50) Pisa, Italy
- Genre: Experimental
- Occupations: Singer-songwriter, musician, artist
- Instruments: Vocals, tape loops, keyboards, bass guitar
- Years active: 1979–2008
- Labels: Sterile Records, Earthly Delights, Klanggalerie
- Formerly of: Nocturnal Emissions; Class War

Caroline Kaye Walters (1957 – 12 July 2008), known as Caroline K, was an English singer, songwriter, and artist/producer. She was a founding member of the UK based experimental/industrial music group Nocturnal Emissions in the 1980s. She co-founded Sterile Records with Nigel Ayers in London in 1980.

In 1986 she played piano on the Class War 7 inch EP single Better Dead Than Wed! released on Mortarhate Records.

She released her solo LP Now Wait for Last Year in 1987 (the first release on the Earthly Delights label). The album's title was taken from a Philip K. Dick book of the same name. She also performed as SM Andrews. She lived in Garfagnana, Italy.

Caroline K died on 12 July 2008 in Pisa, Italy, from leukemia complications.

== Reception and legacy ==
In 2019, Mannequin Records released "Don't Believe It's Over" (a Caroline K track which originally appeared on the Nocturnal Emissions cassette Duty Experiment in 1988) as a 12" single with additional remixes.

In 2021, a previously unreleased Caroline K track "Mirrorball" recorded in 1983 was released as a 12" picture disc by Mannequin Records. In the same year, the NoiseExtra podcast dedicated an episode to Caroline K and her Now Wait for Last Year album.

A 2025 review of Now Wait for Last Year for the Discipline Mag website stated: "The album’s enduring power lies in its ability to create genuine psychological transformation through sustained listening—a reminder that music’s highest purpose involves changing how we perceive our relationship with time, space, and consciousness itself. In remembering Caroline K and her remarkable achievement, we acknowledge not only a lost artist but also alternative futures for electronic music that await rediscovery."

== Discography ==
=== Solo ===
- S.M. Andrews - "In a Box" on Standard Response (cassette tapezine) Sterile Records, 1979.
- Now Wait for Last Year (LP, Album) Earthly Delights 1987 (re-released in 2010 in CD format by Klanggalerie with bonus tracks)
- "Tracking with Close-Ups" on Funky Alternatives Three (CD, various artists compilation) Concrete Productions, Pinpoint Records 1989
- Don't Believe It's Over" (12") Mannequin Records 2019
- Mirrorball (12" picture disc) Mannequin Records 2021

=== Production/Co-production ===
- Nocturnal Emissions - Tissue of Lies (LP) Sterile Records 1980
- "Di Lui Non Si Sa Più Nulla", "Fanfare For The Meat Generation" and "Live Blister Bump" on Various Artists - Traxtra (LP, Album) Trax 1982
- Nocturnal Emissions - Shake those Chains Rattle those Cages (LP) Sterile Records 1985
- Nocturnal Emissions - Songs of Love and Revolution (LP) Sterile Records 1985 (re-released in CD format by Dark Vinyl Records in 1992, and by Klanggalerie in 2007)
- "Shankini Nadi" credited to Nocturnal Emissions on Various Artists - Project One (LP) The Produkt Korps 1987
- Nocturnal Emissions - Beyond Logic, Beyond Belief (LP) Earthly Delights 1990
- Nocturnal Emissions - Tissue of Lies: Revised (CD) Dark Vinyl Records 1990 (re-released by Klanggalerie in 2008)
- Nocturnal Emissions - Befehlsnotstand (CD) Dark Vinyl Records 1992
- "Never Give Up" credited to Nocturnal Emissions on Various Artists - Must Be Musique 2 (CD) Dark Vinyl Records 1993
- Nocturnal Emissions - Befehlsnotstand / Shake those Chains (CD, Album, Ltd) Klanggalerie 2007
