= Nocturnal Emissions =

English industrial music band

- Origin: London, England
- Genres: Industrial, dark ambient, post-industrial, ambient, experimental, noise, dub
- Years active: 1980–present
- Labels: Sterile Records, Staalplaat, Soleilmoon, Earthly Delights, Klang Galerie, Dark Vinyl, Illuminated Records, Vinyl On Demand
- Members: Nigel Ayers
- Past members: Danny Ayers; Caroline K Reg Sailyne; Steve Tanza; Fiona Virtue
- Website: Earthly Delights

Nocturnal Emissions is Nigel Ayers's sound art project that has released numerous records and CDs in music styles ranging from electro-acoustic, musique concrète, hybridised beats, sound collage, post-industrial music, ambient and noise music. Their sound art has been part of an ongoing multimedia campaign of guerrilla sign ontology utilizing video art, film, hypertext and other media, particularly collage.

== History ==
The project was initiated in Derbyshire in the late 1970s by Nigel Ayers (b. 1957), a former art student who, during the period, lived in London, together with collaborators Danny Ayers (b. 1964) and Caroline K (1957–2008). Since 1984 Nocturnal Emissions has continued mainly as Nigel Ayers' solo project.

There were many collaborations on animated films with Charlotte Bill. Bill was never an official member of Nocturnal Emissions but admits to being one of the legion of members of The Fall.

In 1990–92, Nocturnal Emissions collaborated on Butoh dance performances in Europe and the United States, with the Japanese choreographer Poppo Shiraishi. Around this time Nocturnal Emissions' Situationist-influenced practice became increasingly informed by magick, stone circles, techno–shamanism, neo-paganism, animism and Fortean research.

== Record labels ==
In 1979, Nocturnal Emissions founded Sterile Records. Sterile Records’ approach was a combination of the experiments of musique concrète and Fluxus combined with the critical eye of conceptual art and the spontaneity and energy of punk rock. The dark humour of industrial music and the writings of various ultra-leftist political fractions were an essential part of the mix. Sterile Records used both commercial and non-commercial media to deliver anti-capitalist messages, multi-coloured noise and information overload.

The label was effectively dissolved in 1986, when Ayers founded the Earthly Delights label.

== Reception ==
In 2013, Drowning In A Sea Of Bliss was ranked #58 in Fact magazine's "The 100 Best Albums of the 1980s".

Nocturnal Emissions were depicted by the novelist Stewart Home.

== Partial discography ==
- Tissue of Lies LP (Emiss, 1981) (Tissue of Lies Revised CD (Dark Vinyl, 1990)
- Fruiting Body LP (Sterile, 1981)
- Drowning in a Sea of Bliss LP (Sterile, 1983; cassette reissued by Touch, 1985; CD reissued by Soleilmoon, 1993)
- Viral Shedding LP (Illuminated, 1983)
- Befehlsnotstand LP (Sterile, 1983)
- Chaos (Live at the Ritzy) LP (Cause For Concern, 1983)
- Dyskinesia (Sterile, 1983)
- The Fight Goes On cassette (Staalplaat, 1984)
- No Sacrifice 12" (Sterile, 1984)
- Shake Those Chains Rattle Those Cages LP (Sterile, 1985)
- Songs of Love and Revolution LP (Sterile, 1985; CD re-issue from Dark Vinyl, 1992)
- The World is my Womb LP (Earthly Delights, 1987; Soleilmoon cassette, 1989; Soleilmoon CD, 1999)
- Duty Experiment 1982–1984 LP (Earthly Delights, 1988; CD reissue Soleilmoon, 1995)
- Spiritflesh LP (Earthly Delights, 1988; Soleilmoon cassette, 1989)
- Stoneface LP (Parade Amoureuse, 1989; CD reissue from Staalplaat, 1994 with Spiritflesh)
- Da Dum 7" (Parade Amoureuse, 1989)
- Invocation of the Beast Gods CD (Staalplaat, 1989)
- Beyond Logic, Beyond Belief LP (Earthly Delights, 1989)
- Mouth of Babes LP (Earthly Delights, 1990; CD reissue from Soleilmoon, 1991)
- Energy Exchange LP (Earthly Delights, 1991)
- Cathedral CD (Musica Maxima Magnetica, 1991)
- Blasphemous Rumours CD(Staalplaat, 1992)
- The Seminal Works –12 tape box set (Earthly Delights, 1992)
- Magnetized Light CD (Musica Maxima Magnetica, 1993)
- The Quickening LP (Earthly Delights, 1993)
- Glossalalia CD (Soleilmoon, 1994)
- Holy of Holies – 4-hour DAT (Soleilmoon, 1994)
- Binary Tribe CD (Staalplaat, 1994)
- Imaginary Time LP (Soleilmoon, 1995)
- Autonomia CD (Soleilmoon, 1996)
- Friction And Dirt CD (Staalplaat, 1996)
- Tharmuncrape An'goo CD (Soleilmoon, 1997)
- Sunspot Activities CD (Soleilmoon, 1997)
- Omphalos CD (Soleilmoon, 1998
- Futurist Antiquarianism CD (Soleilmoon, 2000)
- Collateral Salvage CD (Soleilmoon, 2003)
- Nightscapes LP (Small Voices, 2006)

== Collaborations ==
- The Beauty of Pollution (with C.C.C.C.) (Endorphine Factory, 1996)
- From Solstice to Equinox (with Barnacles) (Klanggalerie, 2023)
- Nocturnal Emissions were associated with the Kernow section of the Association of Autonomous Astronauts.
- Oedipus Brain Foil 3xCD (with Randy Greif and Robin Storey) (Soleilmoon, 1998)
- Mesmeric Enabling Device CD (with John S. Everall and Mick Harris) (Soleilmoon, 1999)
- The World Turned Gingham CD (with Robin Story, released under the name Hank & Slim) (Caciocavallo, 2000)
- Transgenic CD (Solo album released under the name Transgenic) (Soleilmoon, 2000)

== Selected video works ==
- Bleeding Images (1982)
- The Foetal Grave of Progress (1983)

== Soundtracks ==
- The Three Trials – Adventures in Psychotica (Randy Greif dir.)

== Books ==
- ELECTRONIC RESISTANCE, Nigel Ayers, Amaya Publishing (Oakland, CA) ISBN 9780578978208

== See also ==
- Scratch video
