= Skin Chamber =

American industrial metal band

- Skin Chamber c. 1991: Paul Lemos and Chris Moriarty

Background information
- Origin: Boston, Massachusetts, U.S.
- Genres: Industrial metal; sludge metal; extreme metal; noise
- Years active: 1991–1993
- Label: Roadrunner
- Members: Paul Lemos; Chris Moriarty

Skin Chamber was a short-lived industrial metal band formed by Controlled Bleeding members Paul Lemos and Chris Moriarty as a side project. The band issued the studio albums Wound (1991) and Trial (1993), and disbanded after the latter.

== History ==
Lemos and Moriarty formed Skin Chamber after Controlled Bleeding entered a hiatus due to a dispute with label Wax Trax! Records. Unlike Controlled Bleeding, Skin Chamber had a guitar-based sound similar to early Swans, cited by the band as their main influence. The music was also influenced by extreme metal and grindcore. Skin Chamber resembled the band's other side projects, Fat Hacker and Joined at the Head.

== Discography ==
Studio albums

- Wound (1991; Roadracer)
- Trial (1993; Roadrunner)
