= 88Kasyo Junrei =

Japanese rock band

88Kasyo Junrei 八十八ヶ所巡礼
- Also known as: 88Kasyo
- Origin: Tokyo, Japan
- Genres: Progressive, psychedelic, alternative, hard rock, heavy metal
- Years active: October 8, 2006–present
- Label: PPR (Psychedelic Progressive Revolution)
- Members: Margarette Hiroi; Katzuya Shimizu; Kenzo
- Website: 88kasyo.com

88Kasyo Junrei (Japanese: 八十八ヶ所巡礼, Hepburn: Hachi-jū Hachi Kasho Junrei) is a Japanese rock band formed on August 18, 2006. They consist of vocalist and bassist Margarette Hiroi, guitarist Katzuya Shimizu and drummer Kenzo. The name, which means "pilgrimage to eighty-eight places," is reminiscent of the Shikoku Pilgrimage. Their music combines elements of jam band, heavy metal, alternative, psychedelic and progressive rock styles. All lyrics are written by Hiroi and often contain references to religion, such as Buddhism or Shinto, and different yōkai. All albums are released through their own label, PPR.

The mascot character, who appears on numerous album covers, was created by Japanese animator Takashi Taniguchi and nicknamed "pilgrim" (オヘンロさん, o-henro-san).

They performed outside of Japan for the first time at Eurockéennes Music Festival in France, on July 7, 2019. On August 18, 2026, the band commemorated their 20th anniversary with a first-ever performance at the Nippon Budokan.

== Members ==
=== Current ===
- Margarette Hiroi (マーガレット廣井) – vocals, bass and lyrics (2006–present)

Described on the official site as "the bassist, singer and the gang's mastermind" (Ba.と歌と主犯格)
A native of Yoshida (now Uwajima, Ehime).
He started playing the bass in junior high school, describing that time as "practicing until midnight and listening to music all night long."
Briefly played in Green Milk from the Planet Orange until their disbandment in 2008. Also provided bass for the track "Alice" on the 2017 album Bootleg by Kenshi Yonezu.
Has named Ningen Isu as one of his artistic influences; the two bands have also performed together once in 2014. His other favorite artists include King Crimson and Eastern Youth.
His notable bass guitar design used in most of the band's first videos is a custom-made "Alien" model, crafted by Japanese guitar maker Nobuaki Hayashi (Atlansia).

- Katzuya Shimizu – guitar (2006–present)

Described on the official site as "the guitarist, staff officer and acting coach" (Gt.と参謀と演技指導)
Learned classical piano as a child and started playing the guitar at age 15. Cites Steve Vai and Van Halen as the main influences on his playing style.
Outside of band activities, he is giving guitar lessons and participating in recordings of other projects. Has provided guitar for the soundtracks of Nights of Azure and various Atelier video games by Gust.

- Kenzo (賢三) – drums (2006–present)

Described on the official site as "the drummer, gangster and the one who chuckles" (Dr.と極道と含み笑い)
A native of Ehime prefecture, Shikoku island.
Started playing the drums in 5th grade. Named X Japan as having been one of the favorite bands to play to during his high school years.
Briefly played in a band named Girigiri no Kagiri (限り限りの限り) in 2019.

== Discography ==
=== Studio albums ===
List of albums, with selected chart positions
Title	Album details	Track listing	Peak positions
Title	Album details	Track listing	JPN Oricon
Hachi tasu Hachi (八+八; "8 plus 8")	Released: August 18, 2010 (JPN); Label: PPR; Formats: CD (PPR-1004)	16 tracks: 1. "Gugenka-chū" (具現化中; "Materializing"); 2. "Nihon" (日本; "Japan"); 3. "Butsumetsu Torishunā" (仏滅トリシュナー; "Unlucky Day's Trishna"); 4. "Memeshī Onna" (女々しい女; "Effeminate Woman"); 5. "Ukiyo Dēto" (浮世デェト; "Ukiyo Date"); 6. "Hachi-jū Hachi-patsu" (八十八発; "Eighty Eight Shots"); 7. "Oyakōkō" (親孝行; "Filial piety"); 8. "Butt's Trip Bar" (BUTT'S TRIP BAR); Bonus tracks: 1. "Ai wa Sanmoji" (愛ハ三文字; "Love Is Three Letters"); 2. "Josei Mondai to Kake Gorufu" (女性問題ト賭ケゴルフ; "The Female Issue and Golf Betting"); 3. "O-henro-san" (ohenro3; "Pilgrim"); 4. "9.17" (9.17); 5. "Nō wa Netenai" (脳ハ寝テナイ; "Sleepless Brain"); 6. "Taiyō o Nusunda Otoko" (太陽ヲ盗ンダ男; "The Man Who Stole the Sun"); 7. "Sappūkei Gurōbaru Gurūvu" (殺風景グローバルグルーヴ; "Boring Global Groove"); 8. "O-nobori-san 2006" (オノボリサン2006; "Country Bumpkin 2006")	27
Syg88 (SYG88)	Released: August 18, 2011 (JPN); Label: PPR; Formats: CD (PPR-1006)	8 tracks: 1. "Anoyo Love (Album Version)" (ano世love(Album ver.); "Love from the Afterlife"); 2. "Satori+time" (悟ri+time; "Enlightenment Time"); 3. "Palama Jipang" (PALAMA・JIPANG); 4. "Syg88" (SYG88); 5. "Ikinari" (粋NALI; read as "Without Warning", spelled with a character for "chic"); 6. "Carrousel Matsuro" (Carrousel末路; "Carousel of the End"); 7. "Delusion Moguro" (delusion喪黒; "Delusion" and lit. "black mourning"); 8. "Yūbē no Yūtsu" (幽兵衛no幽鬱; read as "Last Night's Dejection")	188
○△□	Released: August 8, 2012 (JPN); Label: PPR; Formats: CD (PPR-1008)	8 tracks: 1. "Bō Daburyū no Yoru" (某WN☮夜; "A Certain W's Night"); 2. "Reikai Nūbō" (霊界ヌ〜ボ〜♨; "Spirit World Nouveau"); 3. "Miren" (((未練)); "Regret"); 4. "A & N & D" (A&N&D); 5. "Ikai Ikō" (☞異界逝コウ☜; "Leave for the Otherworld"); 6. "Madō Wakusei" (⌘惑う惑星⌘; "Perplexing Planet"); 7. "Gokuraku Izuko" (極樂いづこ; "Where Is Paradise"); 8. "Shukusei no Yoake" (⇔粛正の夜明け⇔; "Dawn of Correction")	76
0088	Released: September 11, 2013 (JPN); Label: PPR; Formats: CD (PPR-1009)	8 tracks: 1. "Kuru Kuru Nenbutsu" (苦苦★念仏; "Dukkha Dukkha Prayer," also a pun on kuru kuru); 2. "Bōbaku Meido Sō" (茫漠冥途草; "Vast Fields of Hell"); 3. "Shikkoku no Tokimeki" (漆・黒・の・と・き・め・き; "Darkest Palpitations"); 4. "Akuyami Kirishima" (惡闇霧島; lit. "Fog Island of Darkness and Evil"); 5. "Hyakkien" (◎百鬼園◎; lit. "One Hundred Demon Garden"); 6. "Junrei Jigoku" (巡礼地獄♨; "Hell Journey"); 7. "Guchi Guchi Akuma" (愚痴×愚痴×悪魔; "Grumbling Devil"); 8. "Uchū no Mattan" (宇宙の末端☆彡; "Edge of the Universe")	89
Kōgeki-teki Kokumin-teki Ongaku (攻撃的国民的音楽; "Aggressive National Music")	Released: August 8, 2014 (JPN); Label: PPR; Formats: CD (PPR-1011)	8 tracks: 1. "Akai Shōdō RIP" (赤い衝動-R.I.P-; "Red Impulse RIP"); 2. "Imi Nai" (IMNY; read as "No Meaning"); 3. "Kōgeki-teki Kokumin-teki Ongaku" (攻撃的国民的音楽; "Aggressive National Music"); 4. "Chōkankaku-teki Uchū" (-超感覚的宇宙-; "Extrasensory Universe"); 5. "Violet Purple Bible" (Violet Purple Bible); 6. "Tokai no Makai" (都会の魔界; "Urban Demon World"); 7. "Yūrei Doraivu" (ユーレイ・ドライヴ; "Ghost Drive"); 8. "Eito Bīto na Hitobito" (エイトビイトな人々; "Everyone Is 8-Beat")	64
Nihon (日本; "Japan")	Released: August 18, 2015 (JPN); Label: PPR; Formats: CD (PPR-1013)	9 tracks: 1. "Prologue" (prologue); 2. "Bōgatsu Bōjitsu" (亡月亡日; read as "X Day of X Month", spelled with a character for "deceased"); 3. "Zetsumyō Sigma" (絶妙Σ; "Exquisite Sigma"); 4. "Kiteretsu Rejа̄" (奇天烈レジャ〜; "Bizarre Leisure"); 5. "Ginga no Haji" (銀河の恥…; "Galactic Shame"); 6. "Taian Naito" (大安ナイト; "Taian Night"); 7. "Yūsei yori Ai o Komete" (幽星より愛を込めて; read as "From Another Planet with Love", spelled with a character for "dark"); 8. "Urutora Hevun" (ウルトラ・ヘヴン; "Ultra Heaven"); 9. "Nō ga Torokeru Machi 888" (脳がとろける街888; "Melting Brain Street 888")	45
Tōkyō (凍狂; "Tokyo")	Released: August 18, 2018 (JPN); Label: PPR; Formats: CD (PPR-1014)	9 tracks: 1. "Kyomu Kyomu" (虚夢虚夢; lit. "Empty Dream", can also be read as "nothingness"); 2. "Kindonichi" (金土日; "Friday, Saturday, Sunday"); 3. "Nō no Ōkoku" (脳の王国; "Kingdom of the Mind"); 4. "Yūrakuchō-sen" (幽楽町線; "Purgatory City Line", same reading as Yūrakuchō Line); 5. "Tōkyō" (凍狂; read as "Tokyo", spelled with characters for "cold" and "crazy"); 6. "Getto" (月斗); 7. "Shikō" (紫光; "Violet Light"); 8. "Ei Ō Āru" (永・凹・阿阿瑠; "AOR"); Bonus track: 1. "Kaikan Ryokō" (怪感旅行; "Fantastical Journey")	30
Genma Taisai (幻魔大祭; "Grand Festival of Demons")	Released: August 18, 2021 (JPN); Label: PPR; Formats: CD/DVD (PPR-1015)	9 tracks: 1. "Jove Jove" (JOVE JOVE; romanized onomatopoeia of jabu jabu, "With a Splash"); 2. "Dokidoki" (怒喜怒気; a pun on doki doki, spelled with characters for "joy" and "wrath"); 3. "M.O.Eight" (M.O.8; can also be read as "M.O.Ya", a pun on moya moya); 4. "Oh! Soji!" (OH!SOJI!); 5. "Keikō" (慧光; lit. "Enlightenment Light"); 6. "It's a Ma-Day" (IT'S a 魔DAY); 7. "Kami @ Netsu" (神@熱); 8. "Kyōkan Dekinai" (狂感できない; read as "Cannot Sympathize"); Bonus track: 1. "Genma Taisai (Album Version)" (幻魔大祭(Album Version))	19
Hachi tasu Kyū (八+九; "8 plus 9")	Released: May 2, 2025 (JPN); Label: PPR; Formats: CD (PPR-1019~20)	19 tracks "Butsumetsu Side" (仏滅SIDE; "Unlucky Side"): 1. "Brain Damage" (脳騒曲, Nōsōkyoku; could be a pun on kyōsōkyoku); 2. "Yaoyoroz" (YAOYOROZ; romanized yaoyorozu); 3. "Dischord" (不狂音, Fukyōon; could be a pun on fukyōwaon); 4. "Dancing in the Dark" (近頃どうしてる？, Chikagoro Dō Shiteru?; "What have you been up to?"); 5. "Light in the Darkness" (幽光, Yūkō; lit. "Faint Light"); 6. "Instrumental 1" (因素音①, Insuon 1); 7. "Ale.!!" (Ale.!!); 8. "Shout!" (絶狂NOW!, Zekkyō NOW!; a pun on zekkyō, spelled with characters for "peerless" and "crazy"); 9. "Nirvana" (浮楽浮楽, Furafura; a pun on fura fura, spelled with characters for "float" and "happiness"); "Taian Side" (大安SIDE; Lucky Side): 1. "Instrumental 2" (因素音②, Insuon 2); 2. "Hells Bells" (奈落サブウーファー (Album Version), Naraku Sabuūfā (Album Version)); 3. "The Dark Side of the Moon" (鬼畜, Kichiku; "Brute"); 4. "Dusty Springfield" (泥春, Deishun; lit. "Muddy Springtime"); 5. "Paradise City" (沙羅魔都, Saramato; a pun on salamat); 6. "Desert Moon" (不浄と我楽多の砂漠, Fujō to Garakuta no Sabaku; "Desert of Impurity and Rubbish"); 7. "A Love Supreme" (摩訶摩訶摩訶, Maka-maka-maka; could be a pun on mahā and a SNES video game Maka Maka); 8. "Silly Love Songs" (HOTOTOGISU♡; "Lesser Cuckoo"); 9. "Desire" (魔炎, Maen; "Demon Flame"); 10. "8989" (八苦八苦, Hakku Hakku; "Eight Sufferings")	27
"—" denotes items that did not chart.

=== Live albums ===
List of video albums, with selected chart positions
Title	Album details	Peak positions
Title	Album details	JPN Oricon
1010 (-1010-)	Released: 2014 (JPN); Label: PPR; Formats: СВ (PPR-1010)	—
0567 (0567; can be read as "ko-ro-na")	Released: 2020 (JPN); Label: PPR; Formats: CD (PPR-0567)	—
"—" denotes items that did not chart.

=== Extended plays ===
List of extended plays, with selected chart positions
Title	Album details	Track listing	Peak positions
Title	Album details	Track listing	JPN Oricon
1st E.P (ファーストE.P)	Released: April 29, 2009 (JPN); Label: PPR; Formats: CD (PPR-1001)	4 tracks: 1. "Sappūkei Gurōbaru Gurūvu" (殺風景グローバルグルーヴ; "Boring Global Groove"); 2. "Taiyō o Nusunda Otoko" (太陽ヲ盗ンダ男; "The Man Who Stole the Sun"); 3. "O-nobori-san" (オノボリサン; "Country Bumpkin"); 4. "Hachi-jū Hachi Ginkō" (八十八銀行; "Bank Eighty Eight")	—
1st mini album (ファースト・ミニ・アルバム)	Released: August 8, 2009 (JPN); Label: PPR; Formats: CD (PPR-1002)	6 tracks: 1. "Bukkyō" (仏狂; spelled as "Buddha" and "crazy", read as "Buddhism"); 2. "Josei Mondai to Kake Gorufu" (女性問題ト賭ケゴルフ; "The Female Issue and Golf Betting"); 3. "O-henro-san" (ohenro3; "Pilgrim"); 4. "9.17" (9.17); 5. "Nō wa Netenai" (脳ハ寝テナイ; "Sleepless Brain"); 6. "Petenshi to Ato no Matsuri" (ペテン師ト後ノ祭リ; "Too Late for the Swindler")	—
"—" denotes items that did not chart.

=== Singles ===
List of singles, with selected chart positions
Title	Album details	Track listing	Peak positions
Title	Album details	Track listing	JPN Oricon
"1st maxi single" (ファースト・マキシ・シングル)	Released: October 28, 2009 (JPN); Label: PPR; Formats: CD (PPR-1003)	3 tracks: 1. "Ai wa Sanmoji" (愛ワ三文字; "Love Is Three Letters"); 2. "Ukiuki" (浮き浮き; "Cheerfully"); 3. "Bonus Track" (Bonus track)	—
"Armageddon Fest." (幻魔大祭)	Released: May 1, 2020 (JPN); Label: PPR; Formats: Digital	1 track: 1. "Armageddon Fest." (幻魔大祭, Genma Taisai; lit. "Grand Festival of Demons")	—
"The Dark Side of the Moon" (鬼畜)	Released: April 16, 2022 (JPN); Label: PPR; Formats: Digital	1 track: 1. "The Dark Side of the Moon" (鬼畜, Kichiku; "Brute")	—
"Hells Bells" (奈落サブウーファー)	Released: August 6, 2022 (JPN); Label: PPR; Formats: Digital	1 track: 1. "Hells Bells" (奈落サブウーファー, Naraku Sabuūfā; "Hellish Subwoofer")	—
"Dancing in the Dark" (近頃どうしてる？)	Released: December 3, 2023 (JPN); Label: PPR; Formats: Digital	1 track: 1. "Dancing in the Dark" (近頃どうしてる？, Chikagoro Dō Shiteru?; "What have you been up to?")	—
"A Love Supreme" (摩訶摩訶摩訶)	Released: July 27, 2024 (JPN); Label: PPR; Formats: Digital	1 track: 1. "A Love Supreme" (摩訶摩訶摩訶, Maka-maka-maka; could be a pun on mahā and a SNES video game Maka Maka)	—
"Brain Damage" (脳騒曲)	Released: September 17, 2024 (JPN); Label: PPR; Formats: Digital	1 track: 1. "Brain Damage" (脳騒曲, Nōsōkyoku; could be a pun on kyōsōkyoku)	—
"Yaoyoroz" (YAOYOROZ)	Released: March 15, 2025 (JPN); Label: PPR; Formats: Digital	1 track: 1. "Yaoyoroz" (YAOYOROZ; romanized yaoyorozu)	—
"Cold and Ugly" (正怒)	Released: August 1, 2026 (JPN); Label: PPR; Formats: Digital	1 track: 1. "Cold and Ugly" (正怒, Seidō; lit. "righteous wrath")	—
"—" denotes items that did not chart.

=== Videos ===
==== Video albums ====
List of video albums, with selected chart positions
Title	Album details	Peak positions
Title	Album details	JPN Oricon
Kōgeki-teki Kokumin-teki Ongakusai (攻撃的国民的音楽祭; "Aggressive National Music Festival")	Released: 2015 (JPN); Label: PPR; Formats: DVD (PPR-1012)	—
"—" denotes items that did not chart.

==== Music videos ====
Song	Director	Releases
"Butsumetsu Torishunā" (仏滅トリシュナー)		YouTube: Released: August 17, 2010 (INT)
"Palama Jipang" (PALAMA・JIPANG)		YouTube: Released: August 17, 2011 (INT)
"Reikai Nūbō" (霊界ヌ〜ボ〜♨)		YouTube: Released: June 3, 2012 (INT)
"Kuru Kuru Nenbutsu" (苦苦★念仏)	Takashi Taniguchi	YouTube: Released: September 11, 2013 (INT)
"Kōgeki-teki Kokumin-teki Ongaku" (攻撃的国民的音楽)	Taro Maruyama	YouTube: Released: July 9, 2014 (INT)
"Zetsumyō Sigma" (絶妙Σ)	Taro Maruyama	YouTube: Released: August 17, 2015 (INT)
"Shikō" (紫光)	Taro Maruyama	YouTube: Released: December 9, 2016 (INT)
"Kindonichi" (金土日)	Mani Kato	YouTube: Released: February 3, 2017 (INT)
"Yūrakuchō-sen" (幽楽町線)	Taro Maruyama	YouTube: Released: July 21, 2017 (INT)
"Tōkyō" (凍狂)	Mani Kato	YouTube: Released: December 26, 2017 (INT)
"Nō no Ōkoku" (脳の王国)	Taro Maruyama	YouTube: Released: June 26, 2018 (INT)
"Jove Jove" (JOVE JOVE)	Mani Kato	YouTube: Released: July 5, 2019 (INT)
"M.O.Eight" (M.O.8)	Taro Maruyama	YouTube: Released: November 15, 2019 (INT)
"Kyōkan Dekinai" (狂感できない)	Mani Kato	YouTube: Released: December 24, 2019 (INT)
"Genma Taisai (Album Version)" (幻魔大祭(Album Version))	Mani Kato	YouTube: Released: July 2, 2021 (INT)
"Deishun" (泥春)	Mani Kato	YouTube: Released: February 23, 2023 (INT)
"Saramato" (沙羅魔都)	Mani Kato	YouTube: Released: May 21, 2023 (INT)
"Maka-maka-maka" (摩訶摩訶摩訶)	Mani Kato	YouTube: Released: July 26, 2024 (INT)
"Nōsōkyoku" (脳騒曲)	Takashi Taniguchi	YouTube: Released: September 20, 2024 (INT)
"Yaoyoroz" (YAOYOROZ)	Mani Kato	YouTube: Released: March 15, 2025 (INT)
"Dischord" (不狂音)	Takayuki Kojima	YouTube: Released: December 6, 2025 (INT)
"Cold and Ugly" (正怒)	Takayuki Kojima	X: Released: August 1, 2026 (INT)

=== Guest appearances ===
Track	Release	Release artist
"Shikō" (紫光; "Purple Light") feat. Margarette (摩阿訶烈音) from 88Kasyo Junrei: Lyrics: Margarette Hiroi; Music: DJ Rokugatsu (DJ6月)	Batten Shāku (バッテンシャーク; "X Shark"): Released: June 17, 2015 (JPN); Label: Low High Who?; Format: CD (LHWCD-0031), digital download	DJ Rokugatsu
"Pilgrim" (ピルグリム) by 88Kasyo Junrei: Lyrics and music: The Band Apart	Tribute to The Band Apart (tribute to the band apart): Released: September 19, 2018 (JPN); Label: Pony Canyon; Format: CD (PCCA-04705), digital download; Peaked at 22 on the Oricon Albums Chart	Various
"Kata Kamuna!" (肩噛むな！; "Don't Bite My Shoulder!") by Ie no Mae de Gorira ga Shinderu (家の前でゴリラが死んでる; "A Dead Gorilla In Front Of Your House"): Lyrics: Satoshi Miki; Music and arrangement: 88Kasyo Junrei	Onryо̄ o Agete Kike Tako!! Onryо̄ o Agero Tako! Nani Utatten no ka Zenzen Wakannē n da yo!! Original Compilation Album (音量を上げて聴けタコ!! ～音量を上げろタコ！なに歌ってんのか全然わかんねぇんだよ!! オリジナルコンピレーションアルバム～): Released: October 3, 2018 (JPN); Label: Kioon Music; Format: CD + DVD (KSCL-3110/1), CD (KSCL-3112), digital download; Peaked at 56 on the Oricon Albums Chart	Various
"Ao no Sekai" (青の世界; "World of Blue") by 88Kasyo Junrei: Lyrics: Atsushi Sakurai; Music: Hisashi Imai	Parade III -Respective Tracks of Buck-Tick- (PARADE III ～RESPECTIVE TRACKS OF BUCK-TICK～): Released: January 29, 2020 (JPN); Label: Victor Entertainment; Format: CD (VICL-70243)	Various

== Acting performances ==
- Louder! Can't Hear What You're Singin', Wimp!(音量を上げろタコ！なに歌ってんのか全然わかんねぇんだよ!!; "Onryо̄ o Agero Tako! Nani Utatten no ka Zenzen Wakannē n da yo!!")

Appeared as a fictional band Ie no Mae de Gorira ga Shinderu (家の前でゴリラが死んでる), with singer Mayako Shimizu (清水麻八子) as the vocalist
