= Tex La Homa =

British post-rock project

- Also known as: Matthew Shaw
- Origin: Sandbach, England
- Genres: Electronica, post-rock, folk, ambient, experimental
- Years active: 2001-present
- Labels: Acuarela, Talitres, Grey Sparkle, Black Fading, Superglider, Moonpalace, Melodic, Painted Sky Discs, Foehn, Chat Blanc, &
- Members: Matthew Shaw
- Website: Official Website

Tex La Homa is a Dorset, UK-based post-rock project formed in the year 2000 by Matthew Shaw (guitar, keyboards, vocals, other instruments). The music combines "soft vocals with sort of distortion, surrounded by soft melodies, guitars and a bit of electronics to create almost pop-like modern ballads".

== History ==
Tex La Homa released their first album in 2001 (Dazzle Me with Transience).

The second Tex La Homa album, If Just Today Were to Be My Entire Life was released on Talitres records and on Hydrid Electric Records in the USA. Tex La Homa toured in late 2003 and into 2004 in the England, Denmark, USA, France, Spain, Switzerland, Ireland and Scotland.

In 2008 Acuarela released the acclaimed album Little Flashes of Sunlight on a Cold Dark Sea.

In 2010 Tex La Homa collaborates with the Italian band Sparkle in Grey for a split release on Grey Sparkle, Black Fading and Musica di Un Certo Livello. The LP is entitled Whale Heart, Whale Heart.

== Interviews ==
"Interview to Matt Shaw" (Moonpalace Fanzine)

"Interview to Matt Shaw" (Denis Monopsone, Autres Directions)

== Selected discography ==
- You the Listener (2001, Superglider Records, CD)
- If Just Today Were to Be My Entire Life (2004, Talitres records - EU, 2003 Hybrid Electric - USA & Japan)
- Dazzle Me with Transience (2000, Painted Sky Discs - Japan, Superglider Records - UK)
- Oh Peace! Get a Little! (2005, EP Moon Palace Records, CD-R)
- Into Timeless Shadows (2006, Acuarela, CD)
- Some Lost Bliss & Apport (2007, & Records in Japan, All is Number Records in USA and Europe)
- Little Flashes of Darkness on a Cold Dark Sea (2008, Acuarela, CD)
- Driebergen Zeist (2010, Sonic Oyster, 2010)
- Whale Heart, Whale Heart, with Sparkle in Grey (2010, Black Fading/Grey Sparkle/MCL, LP)
