= Joseph Mailman =

- Born: Joseph Lawrence Mailman; 1901 or 1902; Utica, New York
- Died: July 9, 1990 (aged 88); Manhattan, New York
- Education: Syracuse University
- Occupations: Businessman, philanthropist

Joseph Lawrence Mailman was an American businessman, investor, and philanthropist.

Mailman was born in Utica, New York, the son of Jewish immigrants, and attended Syracuse University. Along with his brother Abraham Mailman, Joseph founded the Utica Knife and Razor Company in 1920, which was later incorporated into the Mailman Corporation and was one of the first conglomerates to have been formed. He and his brother founded the Persona Blade Company in 1928, the British Rubber Company in 1934, and was chairman of Air Express International.

In addition to his successful business career, he engaged in numerous philanthropic pursuits, especially health and education causes. He was a leading fundraiser for the Federation of Jewish Philanthropies. He also assisted families escaping horrors of Nazi Germany. With his brother, he established the Mailman Foundation in 1943, which continues his charitable work. In recognition of a 33-million-dollar gift from the foundation, the School of Public Health at Columbia University was named the Columbia University Mailman School of Public Health in his honor.

He died of lymphoma on July 9, 1990, at his home in Manhattan the age of 88.

== See also ==
- Marilyn Mailman Segal, daughter of his brother Abraham
