= Jenna Arnold =

American activist and businesswoman (born 1981)

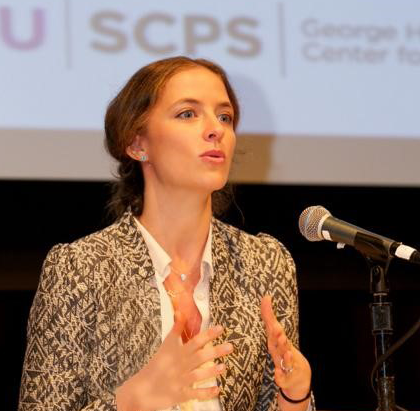
- MedX New York Popup, NYU
- Born: Jennifer S Arnold; July 1, 1981 (age 45); Elkins Park, Pennsylvania, U.S.
- Education: University of Miami (BS); Columbia University (MA)
- Occupations: Activist, Author, Entrepreneur, Political strategist
- Political party: Democratic
- Spouse: Jeremy Goldberg (m. 2008)
- Children: 2

Jenna Arnold (born Jennifer S Arnold on July 1, 1981) is an American activist, entrepreneur and author of Raising Our Hands (2020). She is known as the co-founder of ORGANIZE, for her work at the United Nations and MTV, and was a national organizer for the 2017 Women's March on Washington. Oprah Winfrey has called Arnold one of the "100 Awakened Leaders who are using their voice and talent to elevate humanity". She is a frequent contributor on the subjects of American identity, politics and foreign policy on Fox News, CNN, and MSNBC.

== Early life ==
Arnold was born and raised in Elkins Park, outside Philadelphia, Pennsylvania, where she attended Abington Friends School. She received a bachelor of science in education with a minor in astrophysics from University of Miami in 2003 and a master of arts in international education development from Columbia University Teachers College in 2005.”

== Career ==
Arnold began her career as an elementary school teacher in Miami-Dade County Public Schools and the Los Angeles Unified School District.

While an education and media specialist at the United Nations, Arnold created multi-platform programming with such A-list celebrities as Jay-Z and Angelina Jolie.

Arnold founded PressPlay, a strategic advising agency focusing on global issues. Arnold's most high-profile show, Exiled, was predicated on uprooting sheltered, affluent American teenagers to live with indigenous communities throughout Kenya, Thailand, Panama, Namibia, Brazil, India, Vanuatu, Norway, and Peru. Exiled aired in over one hundred countries and was sold to MTV, where Arnold became one of Viacom's youngest executive producers.

Arnold is the co-founder of ORGANIZE, a non-profit organization focused on reforming the US organ donation system and increasing patient access to lifesaving transplants. The organization's work is projected to lead to 7,300 more organ transplants a year, save Medicare at least $1 billion in kidney dialysis costs annually, and increase transplant equity. ORGANIZE produced advocacy campaigns, which the New York Times called one of the year's "Biggest Ideas in Social Change", built the first centralized organ donor registry, and was an Innovator in Residence in the Office of the Secretary in the U.S. Department of Health and Human Services (HHS), which led to groundbreaking research. This led to an executive order signed by the Trump Administration that proposed a new HHS rule that received bi-partisan support from the Senate Finance Committee; the House Committee on Oversight and Reform; and Senators Warren (D-MA), Blumenthal (D-CT), Grassley (R-IA), and Young (R-IN). Arnold was a featured presenter at the White House Organ Donation Summit, which also included major partnership announcements with Facebook, Twitter, Instagram, and NASA, and a $300 million bioengineering investment from the United States Department of Defense.

Arnold was a national organizer for the 2017 Women's March on Washington. She was a contributor to the best-selling book about organizing the march, Together We Rise: Behind the Scenes at the Protest Heard Around the World.

Arnold was the Chief Impact Officer for Rethink Capital Partners, an impact investing platform working to solve some of the world's most complex problems: equitable education, food distribution, climate sustainability, community growth, and empowering women and minority populations.

Arnold's first book, Raising Our Hands: How White Women Can Stop Avoiding Hard Conversations, Start Accepting Responsibility, and Find Our Place on the New Frontlines (2020), debuted on a series of bestseller lists, as well as Forbes’ "Anti-racism Resources for White People" list. The bookseller Porchlight called it “one of the white privileged voices we should be reading right now”.

Arnold was a surrogate for the Biden 2020 presidential campaign and continues to serve as a political and social voice on Fox News, MSNBC, as well as international outlets. She continues to write, speak and be a source on American identity, allyship, conflict resolution, and civic engagement.

Arnold sits on the Sesame Workshop Leadership Council, is a member of the Council on Foreign Relations, and is an emeritus of the World Economic Forum's Global Shapers community.

== Awards and recognition ==
In the 2021 Independent Publisher Book Awards, Raising Our Hands was named a finalist in the Women's Issues category.

Arnold was honored at the EMILY's List gala along with two other national organizers of the Women's March. In November 2017, Arnold was among the organizers of the Women’s March who were honored as Glamour Women of the Year.

Inc. magazine named Arnold one of its "35 Under 35" in 2014, and one of its "20 Most Disruptive Innovators" in 2016. Arnold also received a TriBeCa Disruptive Innovator Fellowship.

Arnold's work has also been featured in The New York Times, The Washington Post, The Wall Street Journal, Associated Press, Forbes, Slate, Fast Company, CNN, Politico, Axios, U.S. News & World Report, USA Today, and Full Frontal with Samantha Bee. ORGANIZE's work to modernize living donation technology infrastructure was also featured on the May 14, 2017 episode of HBO's Last Week Tonight with John Oliver. An ESPN article recounts a story of Arnold negotiating with the Boston Red Sox during the 15th hour of labor during her first pregnancy.

== Personal ==
In 2008, Arnold married social entrepreneur Jeremy Goldberg, President of LeagueApps, at the Seeds of Peace Camp in Maine. She is the daughter of healthcare executive Lauren Arnold and artist/architect Michael Arnold, who currently resides in Dubai with Jenna's brother Tom Arnold. Her daughter, Ever Alula, was born in 2015, and son, Atlas Oz, 2017.

Her paternal grandfather, William Cahan, founded the anti-tobacco movement, and her step-grandmother, Grace Mirabella, was editor-in-chief of Vogue from 1971 to 1988, and founder of Mirabella magazine.
