= Charlotte Bill (filmmaker) =

British filmmaker and musician

Charlotte Bill is a British filmmaker and musician.

== Films ==
Directed by Charlotte Bill include:

- Windmill Mural Re-Vamp (2017)
- The Last Clarion House (2018)
- Versailles 1919 Return of the Dangerous Women (2019)
- Nuclear Dawn Rising (2021)
- Right to Roam (2023)

== Music ==
Charlotte Bill performs flute, oboe and other instruments on:

- The Fates: Furia (1986)
- The Fall: Extricate (1990)
- Nocturnal Emissions: Reliquary (1992)
- Nocturnal Emissions: Blasphemous Rumours (1992)
- Nocturnal Emissions: Magnetized Light (1993)
- Nocturnal Emissions: Glossolalia (1994)
- Nocturnal Emissions: Binary Tribe (1994)
- Nocturnal Emissions: Friction and Dirt (1996)
- The Blue Orchids: Mystic Bud (2004)
- The Blue Orchids: The Battle of Twisted Heel (2016)

== Bibliography ==
- David Simpson, The Fallen: Life In and Out of Britain's Most Insane Group (Canongate Books, 2009), ISBN 1847671446
- Clapham Film Unit, The Collected Works (Clapham Film Unit, 2020) ISBN 978-1-9999483-1-3
