= Staalplaat =

Dutch independent record label

Staalplaat is an independent record label that is located in Amsterdam with a separate store in Berlin. Founded in 1982, the company's founding mission was to create a sound forum for sound artists, who write and perform new and experimental music.

== Staalplaat artists ==
- Alvin Lucier
- Asmus Tietchens
- Autopsia
- Big City Orchestra
- Charlemagne Palestine
- Deutsch Nepal
- Edward Ka-Spel
- Francisco López
- Gregory Whitehead
- Hafler Trio
- Heimir Björgúlfsson
- In Slaughter Natives
- Jaap Blonk
- John Duncan
- Laibach
- Lustmord
- M'lumbo
- Machinefabriek
- Mark Templeton
- Muslimgauze
- Nocturnal Emissions
- O Yuki Conjugate
- People Like Us
- Pimmon
- Randy Greif
- Rapoon
- The Legendary Pink Dots
- The Tape-beatles/Public Works
- Time's Up
- Tom Cora
- Troum
- Z'EV
- Zoviet France

== Mort Aux Vaches ==
Mort aux Vaches is the name of a series of albums released by the Staalplaat record label in collaboration with the Dutch radio station VPRO. The name translates literally from French as “Death to Cows,” with “cows” being French slang for cops—it is equivalent to “Death to Pigs” in English. Each album in the series is a live session by a particular artist, recorded in the VPRO studios. The releases keep to the principles of Staalplaat by being packaged in a peculiar and interesting way, including using sand paper and copper. Each release is limited to around 1,000 copies. Most artists who contribute to the series make electronic music, with a particular bias toward experimental and ambient electronica. Other genres are also represented, such as metal and noise music.

== See also ==
- List of record labels
- List of independent record labels
