= Mr Russia =

- Origin: Chicago, Illinois, United States
- Genres: Indie; Alternative rock Punk; Garage rock
- Labels: Lens Records
- Members: Ivan; Josh
- Website: www.mrrussia.net

Mr Russia is an American garage rock band from Chicago, Illinois, on Lens Records. The band is made up of Ivan (Vocals/Bass) and Josh (Drums). Excluding guitar from the band's instrumentation, Mr Russia has a unique sound notably drawing inspiration from Bob Haggart's Big Noise From Winnetka. Mr Russia has been compared to modern guitar free band Death from Above 1979, as well as hard-to-pinpoint sources such as XTC and Magazine.

Mr Russia have shared the stage with The Reverend Horton Heat, Girl in a Coma, Von Iva, Thrones, Two Ton Boa, 31 Knots, Earl Greyhound, The Prairie Cartel and Chewing Pics (featuring Naima Mora). They have also toured on their own.

== Discography ==
=== Albums ===
- Teething (Lens Records) (2009)
- Training for the Gameshow Host (Lens Records) (2009)

=== Singles ===
- "Bang Bang Romance" / "Princess Harming" (2015)
- "XOXO" / "Pretty Girls" (Lens Records)

=== Compilations ===
- "Boys Keep Swinging" - .2 Contamination: A Tribute to David Bowie (FTC Records) (2007)
- "Wild World" - Eye For an Eye: A Tribute to Nick Cave (FTC Records) (2008)
- "The National Anthem" - Every Machine Makes A Mistake : A Tribute To Radiohead (FTC Records) (2009)

=== Videography ===
- "Bang Bang Romance" directed by John Weaver
- "Skipping Hearts" directed by Bill Holland
- "The New Standard" performed on Chic-a-go-go
- "The National Anthem" directed by Scott Fedor
- "Wild World" utilizing footage from Carnival of Souls directed by Scott Fedor
