= Lens Records =

Independent record label

- Founded: 1999
- Founder: Robert Hyman
- Distributors: Morphius Records; Cargo Records; Arabesque Distribution
- Genre: Various
- Country of origin: United States
- Location: Chicago, Illinois
- Official website: http://www.lensrecords.com

Lens Records is a Chicago-based record label founded by Robert Hyman. The label has released a variety of work in different genres.

== Artist roster ==
- Ahab Rex
- Avagami
- Beehatch
- Dead Voices on Air
- Delicate Noise
- The Division
- Emulsion
- Encomiast
- Melter
- Miss Autopsy
- Mr Russia
- Press
- Rapoon
- Reptilica
- Robert Scott Thompson
