= Green Milk from the Planet Orange =

Japanese band

Green Milk from the Planet Orange are a Japanese band from Tokyo formed in 2001 after the breakup of the band No Rest for the Dead. Their music combines elements of psychedelic rock, prog-rock and punk.

The band had several line-up changes, but was always centered on members A (drums, synth), dead k (guitar) and various bassists (T, Benjian and Margarette H).

In May 2007 their clip "Demagog" was number one of Google Videos "Top 100 Videos - United States" ranking.

The band got considerable attention for an experimental band with a small, but devoted cult following outside Japan, until it announced its breakup in October 2008, due to artistic differences between members A and dead K.

The band regrouped on February 28, 2012, with A, T, and dead k playing a single show at Kichijoji GOK Sound Studio.

According to the City Calls Revolution liner notes, the following instruments are used by the band:

- Korg MS-2000
- Fender Jazz Bass
- Gibson SG

== Discography ==
- The Shape of Rock to Come, 2001, Ancient
- Birth of the Neo Trip, 2002, Ancient
- He's Crying "Look", 2004, Beta-Lactam Ring
- City Calls Revolution, 2005, Beta-Lactam Ring
- Pirate Radio (digital only), 2006, Beta-Lactam Ring
- Kuruurew vs. Gmfpto (split), 2006, Beta-Lactam Ring
- You Take me to the World, 2007, Beta-Lactam Ring
- Third, 2019, Inferior Planet
- Let's Split (裂けても) (split), 2024, Silver Current
