= Controlled Bleeding =

American experimental music group

- From L-R: Paul Lemos, Chris Moriarty, Joe Papa

Background information
- Also known as: Joined at the Head; In Blind Embrace; The Art Barbecue; Body Sink
- Origin: Boston, Massachusetts, U.S.
- Genres: Industrial; power electronics; ambient; experimental; free jazz; post-punk; harsh noise; industrial rock; dub
- Years active: 1978–2020
- Labels: Vinyl On Demand; Wax Trax!; Third Mind; MVD Audio; Roadrunner; Off Records; Old Bicycle Records; Dossier
- Spinoffs: Skin Chamber; Breast Fed Yak
- Past members: Paul Lemos; Joe Papa; Chris Moriarty; Stephanie Trang Dinh; Tony Meola; Michael J. Bazini; Chvad SB; Michael Larocca; Gary Pecorino; Craig Berry; Tim Smith
- Website: controlledbleeding.com

Controlled Bleeding was an experimental music group based in Massapequa, New York, United States. The group was founded by Paul Lemos, the group's only consistent member. Most of Controlled Bleeding's released recordings feature two main collaborators, Chris Moriarty and vocalist Joe Papa, who both died in the late 2000s. In February 2020, Lemos announced that the band had dissolved.

Since their first full-length release in 1983, Controlled Bleeding released over 30 albums spanning several different genres, many of which were released on notable independent labels. Their cross-genre approach combined with the out-of-print status of many of the group's releases is reminiscent of the work of other experimental and cross-genre groups of the 1980s and 1990s such as Coil and Swans.

== Recorded output ==
Controlled Bleeding have been highly prolific since 1983, putting out more than 30 full-length releases on labels such as Dossier, Wax Trax!, Subterranean, Soleilmoon, and Roadrunner. Due to the broad musical interests of the main collaborators, as well as the influence of the band's relationships with genre-focused labels like Wax Trax! and Roadrunner, Controlled Bleeding's total recorded output spans many different genres including harsh noise, dub, progressive rock, industrial dance, metal, gothic, darkwave, classical, sacred music, ambient, free jazz improvisation, and musique concrète. Through the 80s and 90s, the group jumped from genre to genre; they would often release two or more full-length albums of music in the same year featuring radically different musical styles.

Controlled Bleeding's music is difficult to categorize, not only because of the experimental and varied nature of their work, but also because of the confusing ways in which their music has been released over the years. Some of the band's releases are made of remixed earlier material from multiple other releases, sometimes with new or missing song titles. The band's full-length releases occasionally contain material that jumps abruptly between multiple disparate genres; most strikingly, tracks of harsh noise appear on releases that are otherwise not noise-based. Additionally, in some cases, later CD issues of their original LPs are renamed, heavily remixed, or feature different tracks altogether, due to the group's desire to "improve" earlier material.

== 1978–1980: Early trio ==
Controlled Bleeding was formed in Boston around 1978 by Paul Lemos, Jack Salerno and Dave Southerland. Later, returning to Massapequa, New York, Lemos formed a group with old school friends, Gary Pecorino (organ) and Tony Meola (drums), and released a 7-inch EP called Wall of China Love Letter in 1980. This early incarnation played a kind of progressive-influenced art rock.

Music from these early years was issued on several of Controlled Bleeding's later releases. An LP called Lung Ties which documented some of this trio's live and studio recordings was released on Eksakt Records in 1985 under the band name "Body Sink". The 1994 reissue of Songs from the Ashes includes three bonus tracks of live recordings of the Lemos/Pecorino/Meola trio playing at the New York City club CBGB. In 2008, Controlled Bleeding released Before the Quiet, which consists of many of the Lung Ties LP tracks along with more 1978–1981 archive material. Some of this material is also included on the 4-LP box set Songs from a Sewer of Dreams, released in 2007.

== 1982–1983: Experimental phase ==
By 1982 or 1983, Pecorino and Meola had left the group, and were replaced by two new musical collaborators: Joe Papa, a "300-pound scat-singing eccentric", and Chris Moriarty, a neighbor of Paul who originally filled in on drums. Paul Lemos met Joe Papa after putting an ad in a local music paper in search of a singer. From late 1983 until Moriarty's departure in 1994, all Controlled Bleeding releases featured at least Papa or Moriarty, and usually both.

The next four years of Controlled Bleeding's output strayed from the previous trio's art rock leanings into more experimental areas. During 1983 and 1984, the band released a series of live-to-two-track cassettes via labels like Inner-X-Musick, Broken Flag, and Ladd-Frith which featured layered, harsh industrial noise, sometimes mixed with guitar and Joe Papa's vocal work. In February 1985, the band's first full-length LP, Knees and Bones, was released by Hans Fahlberg on his Sweden-based record label Psychout Productions, featuring a particularly harsh wall of sound similar to the work of other American and Japanese harsh noise artists.

Their second LP, Body Samples, was completed in April 1985 and released on Germany's Dossier Records. Although most of the tracks on the album featured harsh sounds similar to their first LP, Body Samples also had more layered, textural moments, including melodic synthesizer-based ambience and primal drumming. According to the liner notes in the 1990 CD reissue of Body Samples, the layered approach on some tracks was due to the group's acquisition of a four-track reel-to-reel recorder, which gave the band more freedom than their previous live-to-cassette recording methods. Also during 1985, the band released Feet Hacked Rails on Dossier under the pseudonym "The Art Barbeque", which strayed further from noise into more melodic and rhythmic territory; some of the material from Feet Hacked Rails appears on the 1990 CD reissue of Body Samples, along with some tracks from the earlier cassette-only release Shitslipper.

In 1986 and 1987, Controlled Bleeding released five more full-length LPs: Curd (1986, Dossier), Headcrack (1986, Sterile Records), Between Tides (1986, Multimood), Core (1987, Subterranean), and Songs from the Drain (1987, Dossier). Paul Lemos has stated that these releases contain music made by the band throughout 1984–1987, so an exact chronology of the material made during this time period is not known. Beginning with Curd, the band left the distortion-heavy noise of their previous releases behind in favor of a more varied experimental approach. Core is notable as the first Controlled Bleeding vinyl LP to be released by a label based in the United States, although some of the group's early cassettes and compilations were released stateside a few years earlier.

Headcrack is the first record released by Controlled Bleeding that demonstrates the classical/medieval/sacred music influences which would reappear throughout their discography, and the album features Joe Papa's wordless vocals more prominently than any previous release. A similar sound to Headcrack was also featured on Music for Stolen Icons, a 12-inch EP released by the band on Sub Rosa in 1986 under the name "Paul Lemos & Joe Papa".

In 1988 and 1989, the band released two LPs on the Belgian label Sub Rosa, Music from the Scourging Ground (1988) and Music for Gilded Chambers (1989). These LPs continued the band's exploration of medieval and sacred music and mixed it with soundtrack-like ambient passages. Also, most notably, these were the first two Controlled Bleeding albums to feature songs with lyrics. These two releases were remixed and combined for the US CD-only release Songs from the Ashes (C'est La Mort, 1990).

=== Availability on CD ===
Some of the band's first nine LPs were later issued on CD in various forms. Some of the original tracks were not included in the CD versions, and some material was remixed and/or edited.

Album	LP issue	CD reissue	Notes
Knees and Bones	1985, Dossier	1997, Dossier	Remastered with the original LP as one long track, and includes two outtakes.
Body Samples	1985, Dossier	1990, Dossier	Mastered with a majority of the original side A and side B as tracks 2 and 3, and includes material from Feet Hacked Rails and other extra material on tracks 1 and 4. Missing "Intro. In the Factory" and "Bulges Fakes" from the vinyl version, and also missing the music material at the end of side A.
Curd	1986, Dossier	1991, Dossier	The reissued version contains some remixed and edited tracks from Curd, interspersed with 3 tracks from Core and 3 previously unreleased tracks.
Headcrack	1986, Sterile	1994, Dark Vinyl (as Songs from the Vault)	9 of the original 11 tracks from Headcrack were heavily edited and remixed, interspersed with the Music for Stolen Icons 12-inch ep and two unreleased tracks, and released as Songs from the Vault. Tracks 5 and 10 from Headcrack were not included.
Between Tides	1986, Multimood	1998, Multimood	Remixed and includes bonus material. Track titles on the CD version are in correct order but the track numbering is off by one after track 3. As of 2011, the group consider the CD version to be "ruined" and prefer the original vinyl version.
Core	1987, Subterranean	-	Other than the three tracks included on the 1991 reissue of Curd and the two tracks included on the Gag compilation, Core was not issued on CD.
Songs from the Drain	1987, Dossier	1994, Dossier	Remixed and remastered, with three introductory bonus tracks and three bonus tracks of the band live at CBGB, 1979 or 1980.
Music from the Scourging Ground	1988, Sub Rosa	1989, KK Records	The CD version is remixed and resequenced, and features one bonus track, the complete version of "In Drowning Hands". The remixed versions also appear on Songs from the Ashes.
Music for Gilded Chambers	1989, Sub Rosa	1990, C'est La Mort (as Songs from the Ashes)	Six of the original nine tracks were remixed and included on Songs from the Ashes; the other three tracks re-appeared on Trudge and Gag.

== 1989–1993: Industrial dance and metal phase ==
=== Industrial dance ===
From 1988 to 1990, Controlled Bleeding made another strong stylistic shift and recorded several releases of metal-tinged industrial dance music which were released on Wax Trax! Records. Thanks to the label's large advertising budget and a favorable critical response, this material provided the highest record sales of the band's career thus far, and gave the band a worldwide reputation as an industrial dance act. The first EP in this style, Songs from the Grinding Wall (1989), was heavily promoted by the label, and was followed by a full-length release, Trudge (1989), which the label promoted further by issuing 12-inch singles for the album tracks "The Fodder Song" and "Words (of the Dying)".

In addition to a heavier use of MIDI sequencing and sampling, these were the first Controlled Bleeding recordings to prominently feature Chris Moriarty's vocals, and Moriarty and Lemos shared lead vocal duties throughout. They also used lyrics a lot more often, signaling a departure from the often wordless vocals provided by Joe Papa on previous releases. Lemos and Moriarty later released a side project EP, Joined at the Head (1990, Wax Trax!), which blended Trudge sounds with more metal and thrash influences. These Wax Trax! releases were later reissued on the CD compilation Buried Blessings (1993, Cleopatra), although "Healing Time" and "Christ Said" from Trudge were omitted.

Two of the J.A.T.H. tracks would later appear on their next industrial dance album Penetration (1992, Third Mind Records), which introduced a slight hip hop influence along with updated electronic rhythms.

=== Skin Chamber ===
Between Trudge and Penetration, Lemos and Moriarty recorded a collection of grindcore demos in their home studio under the band name "Fat Hacker" and sent them to the A&R at Roadrunner Records, not expecting much of a response. To their surprise, the label showed interest, and the duo spent several months refining their metal experiments into an album, now working under the name Skin Chamber. The resulting album, Wound (1991), was influenced heavily by industrial metal bands such as Swans and Godflesh, and was relatively commercially successful. Skin Chamber's second album, Trial (1993, Roadrunner), was recorded with a larger budget, and although it displayed a wider variety of influences and sonic textures as well as an inspired vocal appearance by Joe Papa, it was not received as favorably by fans or critics.

=== Compilations and other releases ===
In addition to the five releases mentioned above, Controlled Bleeding found the time to release even more music during this five-year period. In 1990, compilations of songs from their career thus far were released in Italy (Gag, Material Sonori Records) and the United States (Hog Floor (A Fractured View), Subterranean). The band also issued the aforementioned reworked CD versions of Body Samples and Curd during this time.

Two harsh noise releases would also appear during this time; an archival release of outtakes from the 1983 Knees and Bones recording sessions called Phlegm Bag Spattered (1990, Dark Vinyl), and a mixed release of new and archival noise recordings on Japan's Vanilla Records called Bladder Bags and Interludes (1992).

In 1989, the first solo album by Paul Lemos, Sludge (1989, Dossier) was released, displaying strong industrial dance influences on side A and dark ambient/soundtrack work on side B. Lemos later released another solo album, Phlegm Dive (1992, Dossier) which was composed largely of demo and alternate versions of previously released tracks.

Although the industrial dance and metal releases were mainly a collaboration between Paul Lemos and Chris Moriarty, Lemos and Joe Papa split off to write and record two new albums of ambient and medieval-influenced music during this same time period on two new record labels: Golgotha (1991, Staalplaat) and Music for Stolen Icons II (1993, Artware, released as "Paul Lemos & Joe Papa"). One track from Golgotha, "Awakened Beneath the Ground", would also appear at the end of Penetration.

== 1994–1997: Dark ambient and dub ==
After the cooler-than-expected reception of the second Skin Chamber album, Paul Lemos became disenchanted with industrial dance and metal, and perhaps as a result, his collaborations with Chris Moriarty slowed considerably at this time. The next Controlled Bleeding album, The Drowning (1994, Dark Vinyl) clearly signalled Lemos's intent to return to more experimental waters: the 40-second industrial dance track that begins the album makes a sudden, unexpected transition to eight minutes of some of the harshest noise sounds that Controlled Bleeding ever recorded. The rest of the album was filled with dark ambience, noise, and cavernous rhythms, unaccompanied by lyrics and using very few vocal sounds.

The Drowning would be the last time in Controlled Bleeding's catalog that Moriarty would be listed as a band member on a collection of new music. He went on to release a solo album, Grip Life, the next year under the band name "Body Clock", a mixed collection of musical styles which featured guest appearances by Lemos on guitar and Chris's friend Stephanie Trang Dinh on vocals.

Later in 1994, the band released two more reissues of earlier albums. Songs from the Vault, released on Dark Vinyl Records, was a collection of remixed tracks from Headcrack and Music for Stolen Icons I. The second reissue, Songs from the Drain (Dossier), began with three newly recorded tracks, the first of which was a demonstration of a brand new sound for Controlled Bleeding: dub music. Lemos and Papa would focus and refine their brand of dub on their next full-length, Dub Songs from a Shallow Grave (1995, Dossier), which was composed almost completely of electronic dub songs with Papa on vocals.

The next official album by the band was a two-CD set on Hypnotic records called Inanition. The first disc was entirely new music, and was composed of two new dub tracks sandwiched between two very long pieces of ambient music, in a style and pacing reminiscent of many of Bill Laswell's ambient dub projects. Stephanie Trang Dinh, who was a guest on Moriarty's solo album, also made her first appearance with the group here on vocals. The second disc was a compilation of ambient tracks from their entire career, dating as far back as 1986's Curd.

Also in 1996, Lemos and Papa released Songs from the Shadows on Death Factory/Cold Meat Industries under the pseudonym "In Blind Embrace", which was a more gothic-sounding album that harkened back to the songs featured on Songs from the Ashes; appropriately, the album featured a guest appearance by vocalist Rozz Williams. This album was later re-released in 2008 on MVD Audio under the name "Controlled Bleeding - In Blind Embrace".

The last two albums of this period were released in 1997. Gilded Shadows (Hypnotic) was another full-length electronic dub effort, once again featuring both Joe Papa and Stephanie Trang Dinh on vocals. Their final album of this period, The Poisoner (Soleilmoon), consisted of two long dark ambient tracks, was the most soundtrack-like of any Controlled Bleeding release and featured San Diego experimental composer Guy Lohnes on processed guitar, as well as Stephanie Trang Dinh on vocals. These two albums, although falling into different genres, were both carefully recorded over a longer period of time than most previous albums by the group, and were very stylistically consistent; as such, they received some of the best reviews of Controlled Bleeding's career.

== 1997–2002: Inactivity ==
After the release of Gilded Shadows and The Poisoner in 1997, Lemos took a break from making music, and put Controlled Bleeding on hold. According to later interviews, this break was due to a lack of musical inspiration that set in after working so hard on the last two releases.

In 1999, a two-CD "best-of" collection was released on Cleopatra Records called Rest in Peace: The Best of Controlled Bleeding. The first disc, "Hard Rhythms and Noise", was a retrospective of the band's industrial dance, metal, and noise periods, and the second disc, "Dark Voices and Instrumentals", focused on the band's sacred music, gothic, and dark ambient work. Furthermore, the liner notes announced that Controlled Bleeding was officially deactivated as a musical project.

The next year, a compilation of dub music from Dub Songs from a Shallow Grave, Inanition, and Gilded Shadows called Our Journey's End was released on Material Sonori. This release also included a cover of "The Talking Drum" by King Crimson, which also appeared on the Rest in Peace compilation, and featured Chris Moriarty on drum programming. Although this release was a compilation of previously released tracks, no song titles were included, and the liner notes did not state that the material was previously released. Slightly surprisingly, this release was credited to "The Controlled Bleeding", and was the first time that "The" appeared before the band name on any release.

== 2002–2009: Revival ==
After a five-year hiatus, Controlled Bleeding released an album of new music entitled Can You Smell the Rain Between (2002, Tone Casualties), once again using the name "The Controlled Bleeding". Straying again from the cohesion of their 1997 releases, Lemos and Papa included tracks of ambient music, dub, and free jazz-inspired live improvisation. The album includes remixes of material from The Poisoner featuring guitarist Guy Lohnes, and Tatsuya Yoshida of Ruins makes a guest appearance on drums on the track "Felch Space Scan". The release includes a cover of "Here Come the Warm Jets" by Brian Eno.

In early 2003, the trio of Lemos, Papa, and Yoshida released a full-length free jazz-inspired effort under the project name Breast Fed Yak called Get Your Greasy Head Off the Sham. This release expands upon the sounds and ideas of the more chaotic, improvisational tracks on their 2002 album, and is based entirely on live instrumentation and Joe Papa's unusually rapid scat singing.

Although no new material was released after their 2003 album, Papa and Lemos made some live appearances as Breast Fed Yak in 2006, featuring Kim Abrams and Ron Anderson of PAK.

=== Compilations ===
Many reissues of older Controlled Bleeding material in various forms has appeared more recently. Shanked and Slithering (2005, Hospital Productions) is a compilation of previously released and unreleased noise material mostly from 1983 to 1986 which has been entirely remixed and remastered.

In November 2007, the vinyl-only label Vinyl on Demand issued a limited 4-LP set composed of unreleased live and studio archive material called Songs from a Sewer of Dreams. There is a full LP of brand new music included with this box, as well as 3 LPs of recent and older archive material.

Before the Quiet (2008, MVD Audio) collects a full-length CD of material from the Lemos/Meola/Pecorino trio lineup of 1978–1981.

Finally, a 4-CD compilation on Hong Kong label Ultra Mail Productions called Gibbering Canker-Opera Slaves was released in 2009, featuring both remastered cassette-only tracks and a large amount of new and old unreleased material; the track selection on this CD box set slightly overlaps the material on the LP box set Songs from a Sewer of Dreams. The box set is limited to 400 copies, 200 of which include a bonus 5th disc and are signed by Paul Lemos.

Although Chris Moriarty and Paul Lemos had begun talking about reforming Skin Chamber, Moriarty died in Phoenix, Arizona on March 22, 2008. Joe Papa died on November 23, 2009.

== Current status ==
Beginning in early 2010, Lemos began improvisational collaborations with Ron Anderson of PAK and Weasel Walter, and began preparing EPs of new material for Soleilmoon and Rich Black's label Winged Disk. Black compiled a series of short videos to go along with the group's short, layered pieces entitled "Bees (1-6)", which was posted on YouTube. (Bees (1-6) video)

In 2011, Lemos formed a new trio with original drummer Tony Meola (who played drums in the very early years) and keyboardist Mike Bazini of Dystopia One, and recorded a new set of material with producer Martin Bisi (Swans, The Young Gods), which was released as "Odes to Bubbler" (Winged Disk / Soleilmoon, 2011). The new trio played several live dates in the NYC area in that year, including shows at Cake Shop NYC and Silent Barn in Bushwick, Brooklyn.

In 2012 Paul Lemos with Meola, Bazini and also Chvad SB set up a new band that released a split album with the Italian experimental band Sparkle in Grey ("Perversions of The Aging Savant", Off Records / Old Bicycle Records, 2015) and a full record titled "Larva Lumps and Baby Bumps" (Artoffact Records, 2016).

As of 2019, Lemos is a high-school English Literature teacher on Long Island, New York.

In 2018 Controlled Bleeding added new drummer Michael Larocca to the band. The new line-up consisting of Lemos, Bazini, Chvad SB and Larocca performed at the Deathfests Days of Darkness festival in Baltimore, MD. in October 2018.

On February 11, 2020, Lemos announced the end of the band, citing frustrations with live performances. While admitting the band has plenty of unreleased music, there is no certainty as to if or when it will ever be released.

== Partial discography ==
- Wall of China Love Letter (SoupTime, 1981)
- Lung Ties (as Body Sink), (Eksakt Records, 1985)
- Body Samples (Dossier, 1985)
- Feet Hacked Rails (as The Art Barbeque), (Dossier, 1985)
- Knees & Bones (Psychout Productions, 1985)
- Between Tides (Multimood, 1986)
- Core (Subterranean Records, 1986)
- Curd (Dossier, 1986)
- Halved (split LP with Maybe Mental) (Placebo Records, 1986)
- Headcrack (Sterile Records, 1986)
- Music from the Scourging Ground (Sub Rosa, 1987)
- Songs from the Drain (Dossier, 1987)
- Music for Gilded Chambers (Sub Rosa, 1988)
- Songs from the Ashes (C'est La Mort, 1989)
- The Fodder Song (Wax Trax, 1989)
- Songs from the Grinding Wall (Wax Trax, 1989)
- Gag (Materiali Sonori, 1990)
- Hog Floor (A Fractured View) (Subterranean Records, 1990)
- Phlegm Bag Spattered (Dark Vinyl Records, 1990)
- Trudge (Wax Trax, 1990)
- Golgotha (Staalplaat, 1991)
- Bladder Bags and Interludes (Vanilla Records, 1992)
- Penetration (Third Mind Records, 1992)
- Pets for Meat / The Gylsboda Snake (Musical Tragedies, 1994)
- Songs from the Vault (Dark Vinyl Records, 1994)
- The Drowning (Dark Vinyl Records, 1994)
- Dub Songs from a Shallow Grave (Nuclear Blast, 1995)
- Inanition (Hypnotic, 1996)
- Songs from the Shadows (as In Blind Embrace), (Death Factory, 1996)
- Night Shadows (split LP with Dive) (Fast forward Recordings, 1996)
- Gilded Shadows (Hypnotic, 1997)
- The Poisoner (Soleilmoon, 1997)
- Our Journey's End (Materiali Sonori, 2000)
- Can You Smell the Rain Between (Tone Casualties, 2000)
- Shanked and Slithering (Hospital Recordings, 2005)
- Songs from a Sewer of Dreams (Vinyl On Demand, 2007)
- Before the Quiet (MVD Audio, 2008)
- In Blind Embrace: Songs from the Shadows (MVD Audio, 2008)
- Gibbering Canker-Opera Slaves (Studies in Meditation and Evisceration) Volume One (Ultra Mail Production, 2009)
- Odes to Bubbler (Winged Disk / Soleilmoon, 2011)
- Perversions of the Aging Savant with Sparkle in Grey (Off Records / Old Bicycle Records, 2015)
- Larva Lumps and Baby Bumps (Artoffact Records, 2016)
- Carving Songs (Artoffact Records, 2017)

== See also ==
- List of ambient music artists
