= Time's Up (O.C. song) =

Single by O.C.

from the album Word...Life
- B-side: "Time's Up (Buckwild Remix)"
- Released: July 19, 1994
- Recorded: 1993–1994
- Genre: Hip hop
- Length: 3:26
- Label: Wild Pitch
- Songwriters: Omar Credle; Anthony Best
- Producer: Buckwild

O.C. singles chronology
"Time's Up" (1994)	"Born 2 Live" (1994)

Music video
- "Time's Up" on YouTube

"Time's Up" is the debut single by American rapper O.C., released on July 19, 1994 as the lead single from his debut studio album Word...Life (1994). Produced by Buckwild, it samples Les DeMerle's cover of "A Day in the Life" by the Beatles and "Hey Young World" by Slick Rick.

== Background ==
The song was originally intended for rapper Pharoahe Monch. Another producer had played the loop in the song's beat for him. When O.C. heard the beat, he decided to rap over it since Monch did not use it. By the time he completed Word...Life, O.C. shared the loop with Buckwild and they subsequently created the final track together.

== Composition ==
In the song, O.C. addresses the state of the hip-hop industry. Over production composed of droning bass guitar, some hi-hats and snares, and piano, he denounces rappers in general for being dishonest about their lifestyles in their songs for commercial gain. He notably declares that he would "rather be broke and have a whole lot of respect" and points out that most mainstream rappers only rap about committing crime or sex. The chorus features the sample of "Hey Young World". The remix samples "Dolphin Dance" by Ahmad Jamal Trio.

== Reception ==
The song was well-received by music critics. In a review of the single, The Source described it as a "much needed wake-up call for hip-hop's ignorant masses", adding "When O.C. opens with, 'You lack the minerals and vitamins / Irons and the niacins / Fuck who that I offend / Rappers sit back I'm 'bout to begin...' - you're immediately pulled into his sphere of influence. O manipulates words to create multi-layer meanings, reflective quotables, and an ominous aura of invincibility." Matt Jost of RapReviews lauded its message and production, writing in regard to the latter, "As heavy as Buckwild's beat, a skeletal but full-sounding track consisting of a distinctive bassline lead, subtle snares and a sparsely administered, sharply snapping guitar lick. The scratched Slick Rick line (not the standard "La-Di-Da-Di" or "The Show" quote) topping it off was all the hook this track ever needed." Jeff "Chairman" Mao of The Source commented the song "not only spoke to the problems plaguing contemporary hip-hop but also provided its own relentlessly dope musical remedy"; he described it as "the rare single that led by example", as it "sounded the impeding death knell for 'those who pose original but really ain't true.'" Sha Be Allah of The Source called it a "timeless indictment that still hits hard three decades later" and "Hip Hop oath, a lyrical measuring stick, and a class in authenticity delivered in three minutes."

In 2012, O.C. considered the second verse of "Time's Up" to be the "proudest verse" of his career during an interview with HipHopDX.

== In popular culture ==
The instrumental of "Time's Up" was used in the movie 8 Mile, starring rapper Eminem, in a rap battle scene. The song was a scathing accusation, pointed at thug-posturers who were flooding the hip-hop scene at the time.

== Charts ==
Chart (1994)	Peak position
US Hot Dance Music/Maxi-Singles Sales (Billboard)	34
