= Sparkle in Grey =

Italian electronica and post-rock project

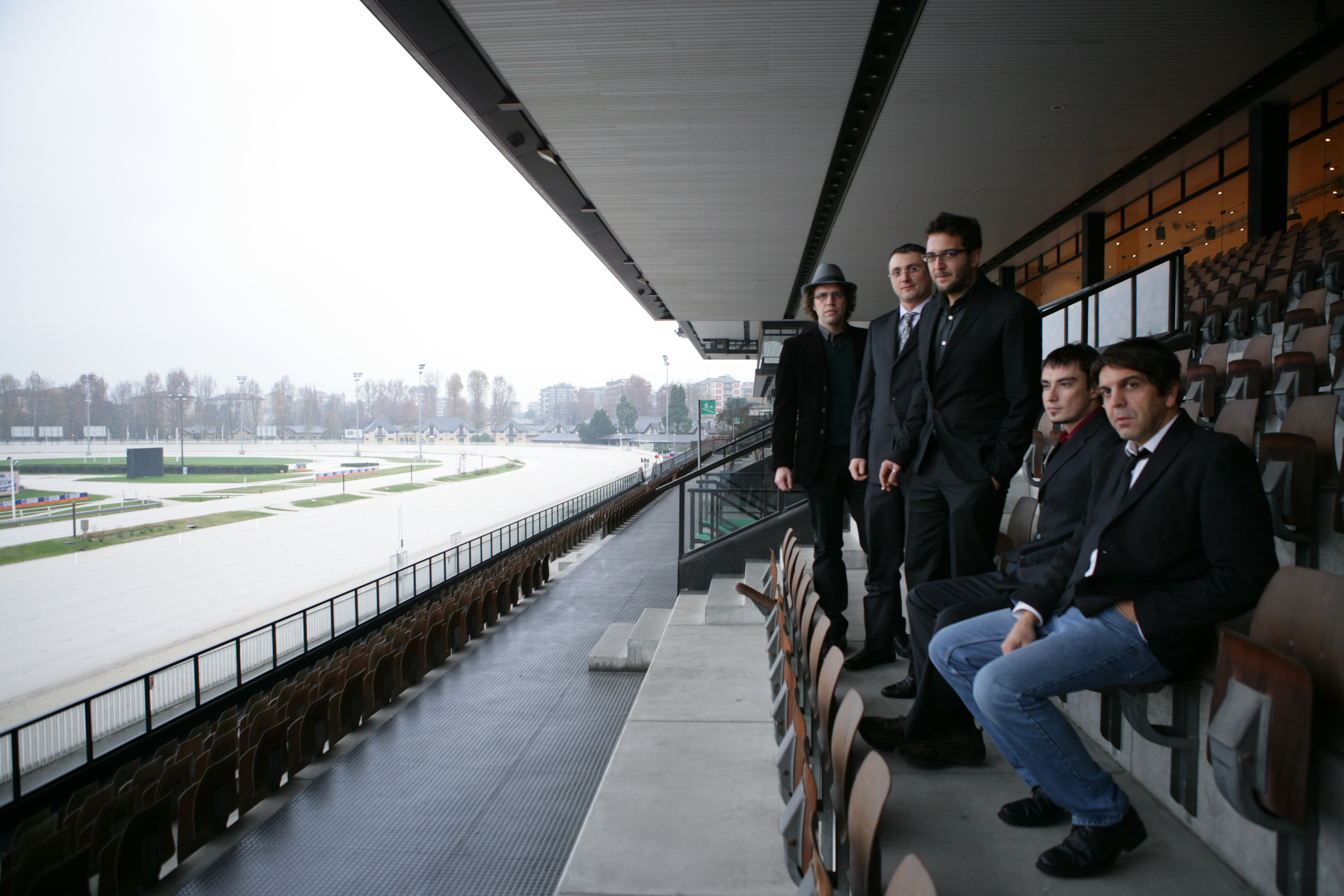
- Sparkle in Grey in Milan, 2010

Background information
- Origin: Milan, Italy
- Genres: Electronica; Post-rock; Folk; Ambient; Experimental
- Years active: 1999-present
- Labels: ADN, stella*nera, Ol Bicycle, Lizard, Off Records, Disasters By Choice, Grey Sparkle, Afe, Moving Records, Black Fading, Musica di un Certo Livello, Show Me Your Wounds, Cold Current
- Members: Matteo Uggeri, Alberto Carozzi, Cristiano Lupo, Franz Krostopovic
- Past members: Simone Riva, Osvaldo Arioldi Schwartz, Deborah Arnold, Andrea Serrapiglio, Luca Serrapiglio, Lucija Krostopovic, Yan Jun, Zacharia Diatta
- Website: Official Website

Sparkle in Grey is a Milan, Italy-based electronica and post-rock project formed in 1999 by Matteo Uggeri (laptop, electronics and field recordings). In 2005 two new members joined the project: Cristiano Lupo (guitar and drums), who was also in previous new-wave/industrial band Norm with Uggeri, and Alberto Carozzi (bass and guitar), from the post rock band Yakudoshi. In 2006 Franz Krostopovic joined the band with violin and then keyboards.

== History ==
Sparkle in Grey, as a solo project, was an electronic beat and melodies based assembly in a Morr Music/Warp style. The first record, The Echoes of Thiiings contains thirteen tracks and was released by the Italian label Afe Records. A second record titled Fadiiing Echoes contains remixed versions of the original tracks by other musicians including Nicola Ratti, Telepherique, and Pleo.

In 2007, the group collaborated with industrial musician M.B./Maurizio Bianchi for the album Nefelodhis. The group's second album, A Quiet Place was released in 2008. The band's next collaboration was in 2010 with Cristiano Santini) and Tex La Homa for the album Whale Heart, Whale Heart.

In 2011 a group of Italian and Swiss labels publishes "Mexico", an album that mixes the previous influences (post-rock and electronics) with dub, new wave and other genres. It was recorded by Cristiano Santini, mixed by Giuseppe Ielasi and mastered by Andrea Serrapiglio (which collaborates with Carla Bozulich). One of the strange characteristics of the album is the inclusion of a sample by Salvatore Borsellino, brother of Paolo Borsellino, who was killed by the mafia in 1992. It's one of the first political act of the band, that will get deeper into this topics with the following album.

In 2013 "Thursday Evening" was issued as a cooperative effort by two Swiss labels (Old Bicycle Records and Show Me Your Wounds) and two Italian ones (Lizard and Grey Sparkle, the label of the band itself).

In 2014 they released "The Calendar", a mostly acoustic record that includes a booklet with a picture for every month of the year.

In 2015 they released an (anti)split album with the American band Controlled Bleeding entitled "Perversions of the Aging Savant" on the Belgian label Off Records, owned by the occasional drummer of Tuxedomoon, Alain Lefebvre. At the end of the same year they released on their own label Grey Sparkle, "Prohibido Es Cantar", a sort of live celebration of their decade-long career.

راديو إزداغ ( "Brahim Izdag" ) is their 2016 work, in which the 'ethnic influences' already present in previous works became more insistent. The album feats guests such as Osvaldo Arioldi Schwartz, Andrea Serrapiglio, the 'chinoiser' Yan Jun and the Senegalese singer Zacharia Diatta.

The band kept incorporating word music elements, publishing in 2018 a 7" " Mevlanian Ears ", with vocal contribution, in Arabic, by the Egyptian singer Reem Soliman. The B side features the other Italian group Le Forbici di Manitù.

In the same year they published "Milan", dedicated to the city of the band, in which they find new balance between the multiple influences of the four musicians (defined by the magazine Mucchio Selvaggio "the paladins of the non-genre") and to the Italian songwriting tradition. Among the covers we can find the English groups of And Also the Trees and Throbbing Gristle, to reconfirm the steady wave and industrial roots of some of the group members, Uggeri in particular, which recently launched a new project named Barnacles.

A characteristic of the group is also the use of drawings instead of photographs, where the four components are depicted as a funny little men from round shapes ('Roundmen'), with whom they have also realized the video of the song " Goose Game ".

“The music of Sparkle in Grey is always well balanced and extremely intense. “ Denis ‘Monopsone’ (Autres Directions)

“The profound bass-line and the classical violin have something in common with Tuxedomoon, but Sparkle in Grey show they have already achieved a personal and very poetic style.” Vittore Baroni (Rumore)

== Interviews ==
"Metamorfosi industriale", Blow Up, July/Aug 2008

"Gli intona(r)umori", ''Rockerilla, June/July 2008

== Radio transmissions ==
“A blend of electronic and post-rock music, where the acoustics tune in perfectly with the crackling of electronics." Nicola Catalano (Battiti, Radio3)

"Delusion Song: here’s an example of a perfect song." Renato Scuffietti (Radio Popolare)

== Selected discography ==
- Two Sing, Too Swing (2021, Dischi di Plastica, stella*nera, Grey Sparkle, Moving Records & Comics, CD)
- Milano (2018, stella*nera/ADN/Grey Sparkle/Moving Records & Comics, CD)
- Mevlanian Ears (2018, Grey Sparkle, 7")
- ﺭﺍﺩﻳﻮ ﺇﺯﺩﺍﻍ (2016, Grey Sparkle/Moving Records & Comics/Old Bicycle, CD)
- Es Prohibido Cantar - LIVE 2005-2015 (2015, Grey Sparkle, CD)
- Perversions of the Aging Savant, with Controlled Bleeding (2015, Off Records/Old Bicycle, limited edition CD)
- The Calendar, (2014, Grey Sparkle/Old Bicycle/Lizard/Moving Records and Comics, Gattolino, CD with book)
- Thursday Evening, (2013, Grey Sparkle/Old Bicycle/Lizard/SMYW, CD with peeble)
- Goose Game, (2011, Grey Sparkle, CD-R/free download)
- Mexico, (2011, Lizard/Grey Sparkle/MCL/Afe/Old Bicycle, CD)
- Whale Heart, Whale Heart, with Tex La Homa (2010, Black Fading Records/Grey Sparkle/MCL, LP)
- A Quiet Place (2008, Disasters By Choice, CD)
- Nefelodhis, with M.B./Maurizio Bianchi (2007, Musica di un Certo Livello/Cold Current, CD)
- The Echoes of Thiiings/Fadiiing Echoes (2005, Afe, CD-R)
- The Coldest January (2004, ctrl+alt+canc/sine3pm, mp3)
