= Time's Up (artist group) =

Artist collective based in Linz

Time's Up is an international group of artists founded in 1996 in Linz on the Danube, Austria, and based in the port area. The "Laboratory for Experimental Situations" (self-definition) develops a wide variety of spatial installations, some of which can be classified as interactive and others as mechanical art. Older works of the group mainly refer to questions, aspects and interactions of human perception, control and biomechanics. The more recent works of the group are characterized by a distinct narrative character. Accordingly, fictional or semi-fictional characters, stories and the design of the environment play a correspondingly important role in their current narrative productions and installations. Time's Up's oeuvre has been presented in Europe, the United States, Africa, Asia and Australia.

== Work Series ==
Time's Up has shown a large number of works as individual objects and as complete environments internationally. The exhibitions fall into four main phases:

- Hyperfitness Studio (1997-2004), media machines for the whole body.
- Spherical Projection Interface SPIN (2000-2006), premiered at the Ars Electronics Festival 2000 achieved artistic and technical attention.
- Sensory Circus (2002-2006).
- Since 2007 main works have been around narrative and living environments.

The group has been involved in an extensive network of European projects, working closely with groups such as FoAM, M-ITI and ATOL. Matt Heckert worked closely with the group in the first year, members of the group have worked closely with Chico MacMurtrie within the Amorphic Robot Works.

== Publications ==
The Anchortronic series of residencies culminated in the release of the same named DVD on the Dutch-German label Staalplaat. The book "PARN: Physical and Alternate Reality Narratives" was published in 2012 at the end of the project with the same name. The books "Futurish" and "Turtles and Dragons" were created using the book sprint methodology and published in short runs on demand.
