= Greg Segal =

American entrepreneur

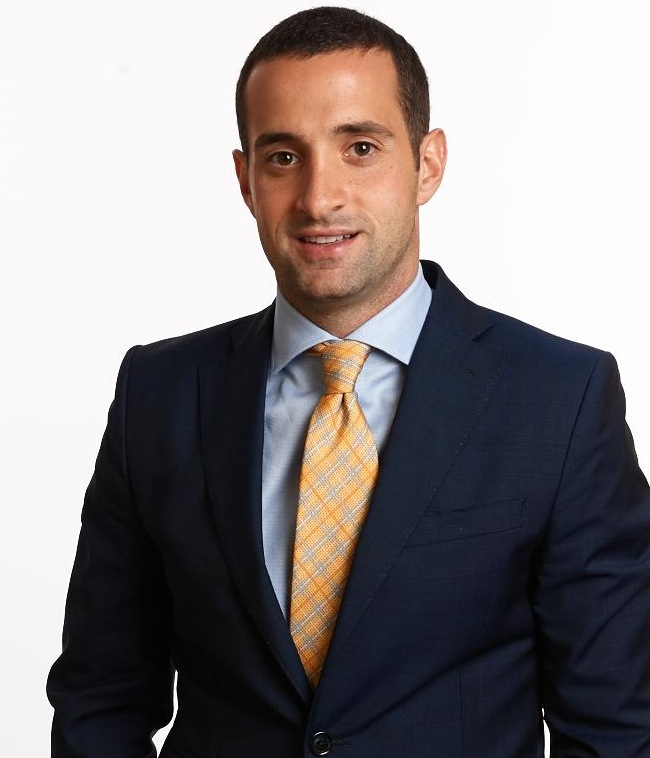
- Greg Segal in 2014
- Born: Gregory Lyons Segal; June 13, 1984 (age 42); United States
- Education: Duke University
- Occupations: Entrepreneur, healthcare/social-impact leader
- Years active: 2006–present
- Known for: Co-founder and CEO of Organize (non-profit reforming organ donation system)
- Board member of: Board of Advocates, Human Rights First

Gregory Lyons Segal (born June 13, 1984) is an American entrepreneur. He is best known for founding the non-profit Organize to address the US organ donation shortage after his father waited five years for a heart transplant.

== Career ==
Segal began his career at Rethink Education, an education technology venture capital firm. In 2013 he co-founded the non-profit Organize to address the US organ donation shortage after his father waited five years for a heart transplant.

Segal's research has been heavily cited through four separate congressional investigations from the Senate Finance Committee, the House Energy & Commerce Committee, the House Ways and Means Committee, and the House Oversight Committee into failures and abuses in the U.S. organ donation system, and has led to regulatory reforms projected by the U.S. Department of Health and Human Services to save more than 7,200 lives every year.

In July 2023, Congress unanimously passed legislation to support the break up of the Organ Procurement and Transplantation Network monopoly and Segal was invited to a small bill signing ceremony in the Oval Office. Segal also provided expert and whistleblower testimony at a bipartisan House Energy and Commerce Committee hearing in September 2024.

== Recognition ==
For his work at Organize, Segal was named to the Inc Magazine 35 Under 35 List and Oprah's 100 SuperSoul Influencers, and was awarded a Tribeca Disruptive Innovation Award and a 2016 Classy Award.

He was a keynote presenter at the 2015 Stanford MedX Conference, where Organize was honored with the Inaugural Stanford MedX Health Care Design Award. Organize won the $1 Million 1st Prize in the 2014 Verizon Powerful Answers Award as the top healthcare start-up of the year and was awarded the Innovator in Residence position at the Office of the Secretary of the US Department of Health and Human Services. Inc Magazine called Segal one of the top 20 Disruptive Innovators of 2016.

Segal has been covered by The Wall Street Journal, Bloomberg, The New York Times, which called Organize one of 2016's "Biggest Ideas in Social Change", as well as the Washington Post, Slate and FastCompany, and his work at Organize was highlighted on HBO's Last Week Tonight with John Oliver. Segal graduated from Duke University.
