= Beta-lactam Ring Records =

American record label

- Founded: 2000
- Founder: Chris McBeth
- Genre: Experimental
- Country of origin: U.S.
- Location: Portland, Oregon

Beta-lactam Ring Records is an American independent record label founded by Chris McBeth in 2000. The label relocated from its founding city of Austin, Texas to Portland, Oregon in 2001.

The aesthetic focus of the label is psychedelic and experimental music with a global roster of artists representing these genres including Legendary Pink Dots (including solo work by members of the band such as Edward Ka-Spel), Nurse with Wound, Current 93, Green Milk from the Planet Orange, LSD March, Volcano the Bear, Daniel Menche, Eyeless in Gaza, and Vas Deferens Organization.

The label specializes in elaborately packaged releases including vinyl albums on 180 to 220 gram high quality vinyl, and cds with highly artistic sleeves and box sets. There have been few if any BLR Records releases in traditional plastic CD jewel cases.
