= Randy Greif =

- Born: 25 September 1957 (age 69)
- Genres: Noise, Alternative, Sound art, Noise Music
- Occupation: Music Composer
- Labels: Soleilmoon, Bandcamp, SoundCloud, Swinging Axe Productions, RRR, Staalplaat

Randy Greif is a noise music composer who often incorporates electronic music and musique concrete collage with spoken word and field recordings.

== Early career ==
Since the mid-1970s, Greif has composed electronic music, musique concrete and computer-generated music and in 1983 he started the DIY label Swinging Axe Productions (SAP) to release his own work and those of like-minded artists. The various alias names Greif has recorded under include Screaming Dukduks and Shadowbug 4. During the first few years of his career, only a handful of cassette-only releases were available, including those by Sound of Pig, Controlled Bleeding, Merzbow, Illusion of Safety and If, Bwana. In 1988 a long 8 minute track by Greif called The Rift In The Earth was selected to appear on the Tellus Audio Cassette Magazine issue #20 Media Myth, which brought further international attention to his work.

== Swinging Axe Productions ==
In 1985 Swinging Axe Productions released on cassette tape a collaboration between Randy Greif and writer Alva Svoboda titled Easy Green Proof that used Svoboda's disturbing poems in which his readings were manipulated and set against electronic atmospheres. Also released was location recordings from Papua New Guinea which featured not only indigenous music but folk stories, theater and a church meeting in Pidgin English. This was the first of several such releases, the other two being from Amazonia and Thailand.

== RRR label ==
The first album done for another label was his Bacteria and Gravity for the RRR label in 1987 on which the second side is one long piece filled with tribal rhythms, other-worldly voices and odd sounds such a bullfrog and car horn. Shortly after this release, Greif teamed up with Mikhail Bohonus of WarWorld to form Static Effect, who performed improvisational music. They toured North America and Canada and released a number of cassettes and vinyl before disbanding in 1990.

== Staalplaat label ==
In 1990 Greif had begun work on his most ambitious project to date: a 6-hour musical and textural setting for Lewis Carroll's Alice in Wonderland. The spoken text is often deconstructed into phonemes of pure sound and then returned to recognizable words. This project took 5 years and the CDs were released serially on the Staalplaat label in special packaging.

The next CD, The Barnacles Inside, also on the Staalplaat label, was released in 1994. Although most tracks on this CD incorporate manipulated voices, there is no discernible text. About this same time Greif began a project with Dan Burke of Illusion of Safety, which after a year of collaborating by exchanging sequences, sounds, and tapes through the mail resulted in Fragment 56. The intention of this project was to use environmental sounds, voices, and atmospheres to create the feeling of a memory or a dream not wholly remembered. Shortly after this release, a split CD with Greif and Illusion of Safety came out titled In Our Little Bodies. Greif's material here was closer to song structure but that definitely does not mean conventions such as melody, choruses, and harmonies. They are highly claustrophobic and obsessive shorter pieces, some of which again feature the voice of Alva Svoboda, sampled and manipulated.

== Soleilmoon label ==
Randy Greif's Verdi's Requiem was released on the Soleilmoon label in Nov. 1997. This is an attempt to abstract the events of Verdi's life in terms of music. The events, however, are all imagined by Greif, and actually did not happen.

In subsequent years, Greif participated with a group called His Masters Voice (or alternately Stylus) which released a CD on Manifold and are featured on a CD from Freedom in a Vacuum / Swinging Axe called Globus and Decibel. Greif's work also appeared on numerous compilations, notably To Step Outside And Keep Walking which has approximately 20 minutes of exclusive material.

=== Three-CD set ===
In 1999, Soleilmoon released a 3-CD set wherein Greif collaborated with Robin Storey (of Rapoon/Zoviet France) and Nigel Ayers (of Nocturnal Emissions). This CD explores a very ambient side of their work, but retains a disturbing edge. For one of the 3 CDs, Randy used Nigel's source material, a second was created by Robin using Randy's, and the third had Nigel using Robin's material.

=== Shadowbug 4 ===
Randy Greif also released a CD on Soleilmoon in 1999 under the name of Shadowbug 4, titled Tiny Voices of Love And Fear. These lean more towards song structure, although the instrumental tracks push the limits of that definition. The only vocals used are extremely chopped up and manipulated electronically. The long out-of-print 5-CD set of Alice in Wonderland was re-issued on Soleilmoon in 2000 with new artwork as well as a set of Alice in Wonderland trading cards that were published in conjunction with the release.

=== War of the World ===
2001 saw the release of Randy Greif's War of the World on Soleilmoon. As a follow-up to his 6-hour electro-psycho adaptation of Alice in Wonderland, Greif returned to putting classic literature through the sonic meat-grinder. This time around, though, the work was far more abstracted, and used the novel as more of a springboard for contemporary ideas relating to war—on a global level, a psychological level, and our own resistance to evolving from organic to digital beings.

Even more than the novel itself, Greif incorporated the Orson Welles radio-drama hoax to explore the realm of disinformation and scrambled information, as well as the audience reaction of fear, even to the point of suicide, when faced with the unknown. War of the World is subtitled "an emergency broadcast" as its overall effect was to approximate the feeling of listening to radio transmissions in an emergency situation (inspired during the Northridge earthquake). The feeling is sometimes a jumbled confusion of reports, snippets of speech with interference, electronic noises, and other mysterious bits and pieces. Then, later, to actually meld into the emergency drama itself complete with (non-musical) soundtrack.

=== Second Shadowbug 4 CD ===
Also in 2001, Randy Greif released the second Shadowbug 4 CD, titled We Are Beginning Our Descent, and continued his themes of depression and angst by way of dark ambience, slow beats, glitchy electronics and cut-up voices. The album also features orchestral arrangements

== Feature film ==
During the years between 2001 and 2006, Greif wrote and directed the feature film The Three Trials with the following description: "Catherine, a nun with a unique form of narcolepsy, attempts to lose herself in the worlds of religion, adolescent fantasy, and finally masochistic devotion to a man. Her husband accommodates her masochism with increasingly extreme and bizarre rituals. With an experimental and ground-breaking format, The Three Trials incorporates surreal narrative, music video, and abstract imagery. The viewer is left to interpret what is real, what is dream, and what is false narrative in this feverish, pitch-black comedy with a smorgasbord of sexual fetishes." The film incorporates his own music along with many of his collaborators and like-minded artists from industrial music such as: Nurse With Wound, SPK, Rapoon, Controlled Bleeding, Lustmord, Illusion of Safety, Muslimgauze, Shadowbug 4, Skin Chamber

In 2007 Greif released Narcoleptic Cells on the Thisco label from Portugal. The album is entirely created from spoken word, but is abstracted into sonic atmospheres rather than as a verbal narrative. Also in 2007 a CD in collaboration with Anna Homler, Brad Cooper and Adam Smith (under the name of Drift) was released on his own Swinging Axe label entitled Bypass Through The Sky. The same year, and also on the Swinging Axe label, a third Shadowbug 4 CD was released called A Thousand Hits Later. In 2009, Greif was featured in the documentary film Grindstone Redux discussing the cassette culture underground of the 1980s. Alice In Wonderland was released in its 3rd edition, with different packaging and artwork, in 2010 on the Soleilmoon label.

"Dirt Crawl Blues" was released as a cassette in 2014 on the Banned Productions label and features tracks that are thick, noisy and more beat oriented than his other recent releases.

Also released in 2014 via streaming platforms on Greif's Swinging Axe label is "Ten Lost Objects" -- a collection of collection of "songs" (though hardly traditional) featuring beats, electronics, cut-up voices and processed real-world sounds. Occasionally veering into a dreamy ambience.

2019 saw two releases --

One, titled "Rolling Electrical Storm With Transmissions", is a 20-minute recording of a rare live performance done in Santa Monica as part of Kim Cascone's Drone Film Festival. Released on the Silent Music label through online streaming platforms.

The second full-length release from Swinging Axe Productions is "Improbable Landscapes" and features a mix of surrealistic, and sometimes turbulent, electronics and processed sounds. One lengthy track, bearing the album's title, was created for an art installation at UCLA by Robert Gero called Infinity Structures.

Between 2020 and 2023 Greif released four albums -- one each year on streaming platforms, each a progression of dreamy, abstract sounds often meant to inspire altered states of consciousness: "In The Court of Ubu Roi" 2020 "Before and After Language" 2021 "Half-Forgotten" 2022 "A Shift in the Frequency" 2023

Beginning in 2024, Tribe Tapes began re-releasing on CD Greif's early cassettes from the early to mid 1980's: "Lost Contact" 1983 "Golden Joy Club" 1985 "Easy Green Proof" (with Alva Svoboda) 1985 "The Shadow Traders" 1987 "It's in a Box" 1983

In 2025, Greif re-released via streaming platforms the obscure album, originally released on the Tesla label in 2007, titled "Narcoleptic Cells". (see above)

== Discography and filmography ==
=== Cassettes ===
- 1983 - It's In A Box
- 1983 - Screaming Dukduks
- 1983 - Primitive Missiles
- 1983 - Seizure Boys/Max and Mel
- 1984 - Fuck the Dog
- 1984 - Lost Contact
- 1985 - Wireless Spine Review
- 1985 - Easy Green Proof
- 1986 - Golden Joy Club
- 1987 - Live In L.A.
- 1988 - Tower Of Iron
- 1989 - Dead Game In Any Weather
- 1990 - Siamese Twin Reflex
- 1990 - Static Effect Live
- 1991 - In A Foreign Tongue
- 2014 - "Dirt Crawl Blues"

=== LPs ===
- 1987 - Bacteria And Gravity
- 1989 - Certain Random Firings

=== CDs ===
- 1990–92 - Alice in Wonderland 1-5
- 1994 - To Step Outside And Keep Walking
- 1994 - The Barnacles Inside
- 1995 - Fragment 56
- 1995 - In Our Little Bodies
- 1997 - Globus And Decibel
- 1997 - Singing The Boundaries
- 1997 - Verdi's Requiem
- 1997 - Oedipus Brain Foil
- 1999 - Shadowbug 4 - Tiny Voices Of Love And Fear
- 2001 - War Of The World
- 2001 - Shadowbug 4 We Are Beginning Our Descent
- 2007 - Shadowbug 4 A Thousand Hits Later
- 2007 - (with Drift) -- Bypass Through The Sky
- 2007 - Narcoleptic Cells
- 2024 - "Lost Contact" 1983 (re-release)
- 2024 - "Golden Joy Club" 1985 (re-release)
- 2025 - "Easy Green Proof" (with Alva Svoboda) 1985 (re-release)
- 2025 - "The Shadow Traders" 1987 (re-release)
- 2026 - "It's in a Box" 1983 (re-release)

=== Streaming ===
"Ten Lost Objects" 2014

"Rolling Electrical Storm With Transmissions" 2019

"In The Court of Ubu Roi" 2020

"Before and After Language" 2021

"Half-Forgotten" 2022

"A Shift in the Frequency" 2023

"Hyperbolic" 2025

=== Film ===
- 2006 - The Three Trials
