= Old Europa Cafe discography =

This is a discography for Old Europa Cafe records.

- Il Sogno Mediterraneo Di - De Fabriek OECD 001 (1985)
- Manifesto Industriale Italiano - Various Artist 4X Cassette OEC 100
- Aurora - Ain Soph CD OECD 053 & OECD 053-X (2003)
- A Silent Siege - Deutsch Nepal CD OECD 045 (2002)
- The Berlin Requiem - Autopsia OECD 084 (2006)
- The Impossibility of Silence - Black Sun Productions double CD OECD 086 (2006)
- Via Occulta - Dead Man's Hill CDr OECDR 037 (2009)
- The Sun - Brume CD OECD 109 (2008)
- Siege (1999-2009) - Death Pact International CD, Comp + Box, Ltd OECD 108 (2009)
- Emergence & Immersion - Voice Of Eye CDx2 OECD 123 (2009)
- Laetitia - Circus Joy CD OECD 124 (2009)
- Suicide Box - Djinn 3CDr OECDR 038 (2009)
- Supernova - Satanismo Calibro 9 CDr OECDR 039 (2009)
- PanAeonic Glyphs - Aossic S'lba CDr OECDR 040 (2009)
- VI Congresso Post Industriale - Various Artist CD OECD 115 (2009)
- Evolution - Nordvargr CDx2 OECD 116 (2009)
- Tetraphobia - K. Meizter CD OECD 117 (2009)
- Pain Implantations - Stratvm Terror CD OECD118 (2009)
- Tempus Null - Gnomonclast CD OECD 125 & OECD 125/SE (2010)
- Ortodox - Folkstorm CD OECD 126 (2010)
- VII Congresso Post Industriale - Various Artist CD OECD 127 (2010)
- Experimentum Solaris -Watch CD OECD 128 (2010)
- Ere I Perish - Luftwaffe CD OECD 129 (2010)
- 2012 - John Zewizz CD OECD 130 (2010)
- Marmo - Merzbow CD OECD 131 (2010)
- Mr. Nightbird Hates Blueberries - Albireon CD OECD 132 (2010)
- Ready For 69 -Dead Body Love / Toby Dammit / Splinter Vs. Stalin Fecalove Cassette OEC101 (2010)
- Misery Is A Shemale Lover - Satanismo Calibro 9 Cassette OEC 102 (2010)
- Kali Yuga A Go-Go - Teatro Satanico 10" single OEMP 015 (2010)
