= Nordvargr discography =

The discography of artist musician Henrik Nordvargr Björkk consists of many projects and collaborations, commonly known as Nordvargr.

== Discography ==
=== Henrik Nordvargr Björkk ===
Description: dark ambient, experimental, drone

Some of the below were released under the name of Nordvargr only.

- Awaken (CD 2002, CD 2003, CD 2011 as Re-Awaken, digital 2014 as Awaken (2014 Complete Version)) – both 2011 and 2014 editions are revamped, remixed, remastered and expanded
- Enter Nordvargr (2×CD 2002) – compilation
- On Broken Wings Towards Victory (CD 2003)
- Rektal_dist 1.4 (CDR 2003)
- Sleep Therapy (Electroencephalography Technology) (8×CD box set 2003) – limited to 300 copies
- I End Forever (CD 2004)
- Partikel (CD 2004) – collaboration with Merzbow
- Enter Nordvargr 2 (digital 2005) – free download compilation from Nordvargr's official site
- The Dead Never Sleep (CD 2005)
- Vitagen (CD & box set 2005) – CD limited to 800 copies. Box set limited to 99 copies
- Semen (CD 2006) – collaboration with Hentai
- Hypergenome666 (2×CD & 2×CD + 2×3″CD + Book 2006) – collaboration with Beyond Sensory Experience and Kenji Siratori
- In Oceans Abandoned by Life I Drown... To Live Again as a Servant of Darkness (CD & box set 2007)
- For the Blood Is the Life (CD & CD+CD3″ 2007)
- Partikel II (CD 2007) – collaboration with Merzbow
- Dronevessel (CDR 2008)
- Helvete (Digipack CD 2008)
- Interstellar (CD 2008)
- Pyrrhula (CD 2008)
- Evolution (2×CD 2009)
- Untitled Navigations 1 (wooden box CD 2009, digital 2014 as Untitled Navigations Revisited)
- Interstellar 2 (CD 2009)
- Avart – Music for Movement: The Complete Sessions (CD 2009)
- A Wilderness of Cloades (CD 2010) – collaboration with Surachai
- Resignation 2 (CDR 2010)
- The Walls Are Closing In (cassette 2010)
- Tyglad Best (LP 2011)
- Otyglad Best (digital 2011)
- Murkhr (LP/CD/cassette 2012)
- Music for N,N-Dimetyltryptamin (digital 2012)
- Uncertainties (digital EP 2012)
- Sirius Carmanor (12″ 2012)
- Partikel III (CD 2013) – collaboration with Merzbow
- The Missing Link (digital 2013)
- The Dromopoda Transmissions (CD+DVD 2013)
- Artifacts from a Broken Core (digital 2013) – compilation
- Wermland Atonal 1 (digital 2014)
- rEVOLUTION (digital 2014)
- For the Blood Is the Life – The Second Strain EP (digital 2014)
- Final Preparations (digital 2014) – rehearsals for the Nordvargr live experience
- Originome (digital 2015)
- Partiklar (digital 2015) – collaboration with Merzbow
- Set / Setting (digital 2015) – alternate version of the vinyl companion to the Murkhr release
- Anima Nostra (CD 2016) – collaboration with Margaux Renaudin
- Atra Acham (CD 2017)
- Totem (2018)
- Metempsychosis (2018)
- Daath (2019)

=== Pouppée Fabrikk ===
Description: EBM

- Rage (LP & CD 1990, CD 1994)
- Portent (LP & CD 1991)
- Betrayal (CD5″ 1992)
- Crusader (CD 1992)
- I Want Candy (CD5″ 1993)
- We Have Come to Drop Bombs (CD 1994)
- Djävulen (CD 1998)
- Your Pain – Our Gain (CD 1999)
- Elite Electronics (CD5″ 2001)
- The Dirt (2013)
- Armén (2020)

=== Mz.412 ===
Description: black industrial with strong anti-Christian context.

- Malfeitor (LP 1989, CD 2001)
- Macht Durch Stimme (CD 1990, CD 1994, 2×LP 2002, CD 2003, CD 2008)
- In Nomine Dei Nostri Satanas Luciferi Excelsi (CD 1995)
- Burning the Temple of God (LP & CD 1996)
- Nordik Battle Signs (LP & CD 1999)
- Legion Ultra (7″ 2000)
- Domine Rex Inferum (CD 2001)
- Steel Night 29.11.01 (4×CD box 2003)
- Live Ceremony (CD 2004)
- Infernal Affairs (CD 2006)
- Svartmyrkr (CD/DLP 2019)

=== Folkstorm ===
Description: power electronics with emphasis on political/historical issues.

- Information Blitzkrieg (CD 1999, CD 2000)
- Noisient (10″ 1999)
- Hurtmusic (CD 2000)
- The Culturecide Campaigns (enhanced CDR & digital 2000, CD 2010 as Archive Series 5 – The Culturecide Campaigns)
- Victory or Death (CD 2000, remastered CD 2009)
- Folkstorm vs. Goat (split 7″ 2001)
- Archive Series Volume 1 (CDR 2001)
- Archive Series Volume 2 (CDR 2001)
- Archive Series Volume 3 (CDR 2001)
- For the Love of Hate (CD 2002)
- Sweden (CD 2004, remastered CD 2009)
- Live Ceremony (CD 2004, remastered CD 2015)
- Folkmusik (CD & CD+CD3″ 2005)
- The Forgotten Tapes (Archive Series 4 1997–2000) (CD & CD3″, CD & 2×CD3″ box set 2008)
- Ortodox (CD & box set 2009)
- Folksongs (CD & CD3″ box set 2011)
- Live at Tower Transmissions III (digital 2013)
- Nihil Total (CD-2019)

=== Econocon ===
Description: noise

- Business Solutions for the Active Terrorist (CD 2000)

=== Toroidh ===
Description: militant, sound landscapes of WWII

- Those Who Do Not Remember the Past Are Condemned To Repeat (LP & CD 2001)
- Europe Is Dead (LP & CD 2001)
- Toroidh Box (CDR EP 2001) – box set with an exclusive T-shirt and a card. The box is limited to 10 copies
- Europe Is Dead.6.Extended (picture 7″ 2001)
- For the Fallen Ones (7″ & box set 2002)
- The Return of Yesterday (10″ 2002) – split with Solaris
- Start Over (2×7″ 2003)
- Testament (LP & CD 2003, remastered CD 2006 as The Final Testament)
- Offensiv! (CD 2004) – compilation
- United in Blood (CD 2004) – collaboration with Arditi
- European Trilogy (3×CD box set 2006)
- Toroidh (7″ 2007)
- Segervittring (Digipack CD & box set 2007)
- Eine Kleine Marschmusik (CDR 2009) – compilation
- In Memoriam – Karl Ohlén (digital 2011)
- Alliance Proditorum (7″ 2014)
- Etos (digital 2015) – compilation

=== Hydra Head Nine ===
The last two albums were released under the name of HH9

Description: noise

- Kod (CD 2002)
- Power Display (CD 2002)
- Heat (CD 2004)

=== Nordvargr / Drakh ===
Description: dark ambient

- Cold Void of Nothing (CD 2002)
- Northern Dark Supremacy (LP 2003)
- Infinitas in Aeternum (CD 2004)
- The Betrayal of Light (CD 2007)
- The Less You Know, the Better (CD 2008) – collaboration with Klier

=== Thee Maldoror Kollective ===
- New Era Vital Order (CD 2002)
- A Clockwork Highway (CD 2004)
- 23 Miles Back on the Clockwork Highway (CD 2005)
- Knownothingism （CD 2014）

=== Muskel ===
- Seven Days of Pain (CD 2003)

=== Naer Mataron ===
Description: Greek black metal

- River at Dash Scalding (CD 2003)
- Discipline Manifesto (CD 2005)
- Aghibasiin-Lessons on How to Defeat Death (2×LP 2006)
- Praetorians (CD 2008)

=== Incinerator International ===
- Head On (CD 2004)

=== L/A/B ===
- Psychoacoustics (CD 2004)

=== Goatvargr ===
Description: blackened noise

- Goatvargr (CD 2006) – limited to 1000 copies
- Black Snow Epoch (CD 2010)

=== Vargr ===
Description: satanoise

- Wehrmacht Satanas (CD 2007)
- Northern Black Supremacy (CD 2007)
- The Twice High Holy Secret of Constant Generation (demo CDR 2008)
- Storm of Northern Evil (CD 2008)
- Aldebaran (CDR 2009)
- Orsic Descending / Ave Maria (2×CDR 2009)
- The Maria Orsic Trilogy (digital 2009, digital 2015)
- Armatus / Vargr (7″ 2010) – split with Armatus
- Mors Omnia Solvit (CDR 2010)

=== Marvargr ===
Description: satanoise

- Likstank (CD 2008, digital 2015) – CD is limited to 666 copies

=== Körperwelten ===
Description: avant garde noise with SM attitude

- Avatars of Rape and Rage (Digipak CD 2008, digital 2015)

=== All Hail the Transcending Ghost ===
- All Hail the Transcending Ghost (CD 2009, digital 2015)

=== Resignation ===
- 1897 (CD 2009)

=== Nexus Kenosis ===
- Elsewhen (CD 2012, CD & CDR EP 2012)
- Further (digital EP 2013) – featuring Labanna Babalon

=== Angst ===
- Tar Ner Skylten (CD 2014)

=== Kongo ===
Collaboration with Peter Nyström

- Blubber (CD 2016)

=== Anima Nostra ===
- Atraments (CD 2017, cassette 2018)
