= Berlin Requiem =

Berlin Requiem may refer to:

- The Berlin Requiem (Weill), 1928 composition by Kurt Weill to poems by Bertolt Brecht
- The Berlin Requiem (album), an album by Autopsia
