= Awaken in Oblivion =

Compilation album by Naer Mataron
- Released: 2004
- Genre: Black metal
- Length: 1:34:57
- Label: Black Lotus Records

Naer Mataron chronology
Aghibasiin-Lessons on How To Defeat Death (2004)	Awaken in Oblivion (2004)	Discipline Manifesto (2005)

Awaken in Oblivion is the second compilation album, and sixth album overall, by the black metal band Naer Mataron. It was released in 2004 on Black Lotus Records. It was limited to 2000 copies.

== Track listing ==
=== Disc 1 ===
1. The Chosen Son - 2:35
2. Faethon - 6:17
3. Zephyrous - 5:33
4. Ta en Eleusini Mysteria - 4:07
5. Zeus (Wrath of the Gods) - 4:05
6. The Silent Kingdom of Hades - 6:40
7. The Great God Pan - 6:16
8. Equimanthorn (Bathory Cover) (bonus track) - 3:38

=== Disc 2 ===
1. ... And Bloodshed Must Be Done - 2:55
2. Diastric Fields of War - 6:42
3. Iketis - 5:39
4. Skotos Aenaon - 4:59
5. Astro-Thetis-Kosmos - 8:39
6. Hyperion - 6:14
7. Wolf of Ions - 7:53
8. In Honour of the Wolf - 6:43
9. Winter War Memorial - 6:02
