= Sleep Chamber =

- Sleep Chamber logo

Background information
- Genre: Industrial
- Years active: 1981–present
- Labels: Inner-X-Musick; FünfUndVierzig; Musica Maxima Magnetica; Klanggallerie; Old Europa Cafe; Vinyl on Demand
- Website: sleepchamber.info

Sleep Chamber (aka ꓢꓡꓰꓱꓑ ꓚꓧꓮꓟꓐꓰꓣ (original name) and SLEEPCHAMBER) is an American industrial noise band fronted by John Zewizz that he formed in 1981 with Eugene Difrancisco and Phil Brosseau as ꓢꓡꓰꓱꓑ ꓚꓧꓮꓟꓐꓰꓣ. The Sleep Chamber lineup has changed many times over the years with John Zewizz remaining the sole permanent member. Previous members of Sleep Chamber have included Thomas Thorn, Michael Moynihan, Jonathan Briley and Elaine Walker. Since the beginning, Zewizz has stated that the constant lineup changes are because Sleep Chamber is not a "band", but rather a "concept".

Sleep Chamber (ꓢꓡꓰꓱꓑ ꓚꓧꓮꓟꓐꓰꓣ) is known for using S&M, bondage and Magical/Magickal references in the art imagery on their covers, during their live performances, and within their lyrics.

From 1982 to 1999, Sleep Chamber released over 70 recordings and participated in over 35 various artists compilation releases). After an extended absence, Sleep Chamber returned in 2008 with a new lineup, a number of new releases, and a revised name, SLEEPCHAMBER.

== 1981–1990 ==
Difrancisco and Brosseau had fronted a band called The Product; Zewizz produced their sole single. When The Product folded, Difrancisco and Brosseau began a band called Daze of Trance. Zewizz occasionally helped out with Daze of Trance, even playing on an audio cassette release as part of the band. Sometime between 1981 and 1982, ꓢꓡꓰꓱꓑ ꓚꓧꓮꓟꓐꓰꓣ came into existence, with Zewizz as the frontman. Their earliest works were electronic/industrial in charector. Early concerts featured Zewizz in different combinations with Difrancisco, Brosseau, Thorn, Moynihan and also Malcolm Smith (with whom Zewizz collaborated in the bands Dokument and Hidious in Strength), Darlene Victor, and Richard Gellar. These live ꓢꓡꓰꓱꓑ ꓚꓧꓮꓟꓐꓰꓣ performances were described as resembling a Black Mass, with smoke (containing a special blend of incense) billowing out of smoke machines. The band wore black bondage hoods while performing on stage and these concerts concerned some local club owners, prompting them to ban ꓢꓡꓰꓱꓑ ꓚꓧꓮꓟꓐꓰꓣ from playing there again. Some local music reviewers accused the band of being Satanic, but Zewizz, over the years, has denied the Satanism accusation.

== 1990–2001, Sleep Chamber and The Barbichuettes ==
During the 1990s, Zewizz incorporated bondage-fetish dancers called The Barbitchuettes into Sleep Chamber's live performances. During live shows, the Barbitchuette dancers would perform fetish and sadomasochism acts on the stage as well as caress and dance with other Barbitchuettes. During the Barbitchuettes heyday with Sleep Chamber, it was not uncommon for the band to travel with up to 11 Barbitchuette dancers.

1990's Sleep, or Forever Hold Your Piece started off that decade as Sleep Chamber's biggest hit yet. This new popularity also resulted in wider distribution for their music. Sleep Chamber saw their material expand from Inner-X-Musick to overseas and domestic distribution by the Italian label Musica Maxima Magnetica, the German label FünfUndVierzig, and Cleopatra Records in Los Angeles. Along with bigger sales came bigger opportunities. Sleep Chamber's local gigs required ever bigger venues. The increased popularity also allowed Sleep Chamber to do two quick tours of Texas in the late 1980s and early 1990s. These tours featured Zewizz along with Briley, Tione, Difrancisco, and Arthur PW. At the end of the Texas tour, Zewizz found himself again looking for a new collaborator with the departure of Arthur PW and Briley.

Elaine Walker entered the picture in 1991–92 to fill that void. Walker's band DDT had frequently played with Sleep Chamber at local venues around the Boston area. Walker was a Berklee College of Music graduate and impressed Zewizz with her abilities. Zewizz and Walker, together with the help of Ashley Swanson, began working on the CD Siames Succubi. Sales of this record were even better than Sleep, or Forever Hold Your Piece. A successful tour of California resulted, featuring Zewizz, Walker, Swanson and longtime friend and collaborator Difrancisco. Although pleased with the lineup, Zewizz was aware that Walker's commitment was to her other projects and that she did not plan to stay with Sleep Chamber. Additionally, by the end of the California LEATHER & LUST tour, friction arose between Zewizz and Difrancisco. Upon returning to Boston, both Arthur Woznic and Difrancisco left the band.

Zewizz then introduced another Sleep Chamber lineup, including new drummer Jay Keegan and songwriting duo Andrew Woolf and Craig Wien, as well as help from previous guitar sideman Swanson. This lineup was the last recording version of Sleep Chamber, performing on several releases, including Some Godz Die Young and Sonorous Invokations ov Brian Jones – the latter being solely Zewizz and Woolf. However, drug addiction, personal problems, and constant touring had ceased Zewizz's steady flow of new music by the end of 1995.

Real problems began earlier in 1995, when Zewizz was questioned regarding the murder of Karina Holmer, a Swedish au pair living in Boston. Holmer's body was found in a dumpster not far from Zewizz's home. The police considered Zewizz a suspect, but no charges were ever brought. The accusation, coupled with a growing heroin addiction, quickly began to destroy the band and drove Zewizz away from bandmates and friends.

Despite those problems, Sleep Chamber took on its most ambitious project to date in 1997, a tour of Germany. Unable to get commitments from the current lineup of Sleep Chamber, Zewizz took on two new members (Scott Walker and Tyler Newman) for the German tour, as well as Barbitchuette dancer "Lulu". The latter's job during the tour included dancing during the shows as well as recruiting dancers from local strip clubs. From the USA, Woolf organized the booking of the German tour. Many stories exist of Zewizz's escalating drug addiction during the tour, and although the band were deceived by the promoters, the shows were well received and the seeds for a large European fanbase were set because of the tour. Seeing his life beginning to spiral out of control, friends of Zewizz tried to help him when he returned from the German tour, putting on a benefit concert.

Despite the problems, releases continued on Musica Maxima Magnetica and FünfUndVierzig. Between 1995 and 1997, three more Sleep Chamber albums were released. Sopor, Sacrosanct and Sirkus kept up the appearance of productivity without any new material being recorded. After the German tour, Sleep Chamber only performed two more times. The first was a 1997 benefit concert (with Zewizz, Newman, and Walker, sans Barbitchuettes), followed by a last Sleep Chamber show on December 31, 2000 (featuring Zewizz and new collaborator Bob Avakian as well as Barbitchuette dancer Semiramis). The final blow to Zewizz came in 2001 when Zewizz's girlfriend and Barbitchuette dancer Laura Graff died of an apparent drug overdose. Zewizz was questioned by police in the suspicious death before it was ruled an accidental heroin overdose.

== 2001–present: SLEEPCHAMBER ==
Although out of the public eye, Zewizz never stopped recording. In 2004, he was able to overcome his heroin addiction and began remixing and recording Sleep Chamber material with a new enthusiasm. In 2004, he released a limited-edition CD titled Sleepsirkle. In 2007, Zewizz changed the band name to SLEEPCHAMBER and announced a new lineup featuring Gimmie Sparks and longtime collaborator Bob Avakian, featured on the 2009 release Stolen Sleep. Since 2009, SLEEPCHAMBER has released over five CDs (on Klanggalerie, Old Europa Cafe, and Zewizz's own label Inner-X-Musick), a four-LP box set with a 7-inch single and booklet titled SixSixSix (on Vinyl on Demand), and participated in several compilations. Unpublished but recorded was a solo project in 2014 titled VAMPYRESS. John Zewizz & Bob Avakian did 6 demos with singer Madam Peacock. Due to issues between Zewizz & Peacock the project stopped. In 2019 John Zewizz started the so-called 'last' Sleep Chamber release. Working with Spike Devitt Eugene Difrancisco, Tick and Bob Avakian. Premiered on YouTube on Sleep Chamber facebook page were "Succubus" and "The Badge".

SLEEPCHAMBER performed its first live concert in nearly 10 years with a live-on-air show on WBRS Radio One on January 1, 2010. The resulting recording was featured on the Stratocast CD. This first live performance featured Zewizz, Avakian, and Sparks, along with percussionist Tick and backing vocalist Zora. In 2009 Sleep Chamber released "Soundtrax" a collection of Soundtrack pieces, also from Austria Label Klang Galleries "Sorcery Spells and Serpant Charms". Panic Machine-(USA) released "Seremony" with the first 100 containing a deck of Tarot Cards. The last 2 SleepChamber performances were at: East Boston warehouse (where Zewizz lived) 12/31/12. (24 hour bash) The last was at Crazy Castle-Allston-Mass-10/3/14

== Discography ==
Year	Title	Format, label, catalogue number
1982	Breath for Brian	Cassette, Inner-X-Musick (XXX 02)
1982	Speak in Tongues	7-inch EP, Inner-X-Musick (XXX 03 & XXX 04)
1983	Dream Distillate	Cassette, Inner-X-Musick (XXX 05 and XXX C1)
1983	Untitled	Cassette, Inner-X-Musick (XXX Cass-Promo 01)
1983	Phonesexual	Cassette, Inner-X-Musick (XXX 09)
1983	Live at Newburyport	Cassette, Inner-X-Musick (XXX C7)
1984	Musick for Mannequins	Cassette, Inner-X-Musick (XXX C4)
1985	Sleep Chamber	LP, Inner-X-Musick (XXX LP-3)
1985	Sigil 23	Cassette, Inner-X-Musick (XXX 23)
1985	"Warm Leatherette"/"Fetish"	7-inch single, Inner-X-Musick (XXX-SEX-3)
1985	Live at the Air Station	Cassette, Staalplaat (STOOB/CDr); reissued 2010, Inner-X-Musick (XXX 74)
1985	Weapons ov Magick	Cassette, Inner-X-Musick (XXX 014)
1985	Submit to Desire	LP, Inner-X-Musick (XXX XXX LP-5 and XXX-LP-3-Pro LP)
1985	Admit to Desire	Cassette, Inner-X-Musick
1985	Icons & Ov	Cassette, Inner-X-Musick (XXX 33)
1986	Trance	Cassette, Inner-X-Musick (XXX 29)
1986	Best of the Rest	Box set (12 cassettes), Inner-X-Musick
1986	Flesh on Flesh	Cassette, Inner-X-Musick (XXX 37)
1986	Babylon	12-inch EP, Inner-X-Musick (XXX-EP-1-DJ LP and XXX EP-1)
1986	Live At The Rat Club 12:18:85	Cassette, Inner-X-Musick
1986	Live on WZBC 11/5/86	Cassette, Inner-X-Musick
1987	Live at TT The Bears 7-8-87	Cassette, Inner-X-Musick (XXX 50)
1987	Spellbondage	LP, Inner-X-Musick (XXX LP 9)
1987	Sexmagick Ritual	Cassette, Inner-X-Musick
1987	Sleep Sanatorium	Cassette, Inner-X-Musick (XXX 23)
1988	Sleep Sequence	Cassette, Inner-X-Musick (XXX 46)
1988	Fetish Garden	Cassette, Inner-X-Musick (BOX-C-1)
1988	Sacred and Surreal	LP, Trinity Records (TRINITY 0002886); reissued on CD 1992, Fünfundvierzig (Fünfundvierzig 52)
1988	Satanic Sanction	12-inch EP, Musica Maxima Magnetica (EEE 02); expanded/reissued on CDr 1999, Inner-X-Musick (XXX-PROMO-05); expanded/reissued on CD 2010, Klanggalerie (gg138)
1988	Sins ov Obsession	LP/CD, FünfUndVierzig (Fünfundvierzig 31)
1989	Sharp Spikes & Spurs-Complete Concert	Cassette, Inner-X-Musick (XXX 47)
1989	Sharp Spikes & Spurs	LP, Inner-X-Musick (XXX LP-10)
1990	Sleep, or Forever Hold Your Piece	LP, Inner-X-Musick (XXX-LP-11 and XXX-LP-11-DJ); reissued on CD 1991, Fünfundvierzig (Fünfundvierzig 51)
1990	"Justify My Love"	12-inch single, Inner-X-Musick (XXX-SEX-6)
1990	Sirkle Zero	CD/LP, Musica Maxima Magnetica (EEE 06)
1991	Stop Being Silly and Go to Sleep (Live in Texas 1990)	Box set (two cassettes and booklet), Inner-X-Musick (INNER-X BOX-C-2 CASS)
1991	Spellbound Submission	CD, Fünfundvierzig (Fünfundvierzig 49)
1992	Secrets ov 23	LP, Inner-X-Musick (XXX-LP-12); expanded/reissued CD 1993, Musica Maxima Magnetica (EEE 14).
1992	Siamese Succubi	CD, Fünfundvierzig (Fünfundvierzig 58)
1992	"Catwoman"	12-inch single, Inner-X-Musick (XXX-SEX-7 and XXX- SEX-7-Prom)
1993	Sweet Dreams Sweet	Cassette, Inner-X-Musick (XXX 60)
1993	Symphony Sexualis	CD, Fünfundvierzig (Fünfundvierzig 59)
1994	Sleeping Sickness	CD, Fünfundvierzig (Fünfundvierzig 75)
1995	Shadowplay	Cassette, Inner-X-Musick (XXX 61)
1995	"Cuckoo Cock"/"Reality Revealed"	7” single, Syntactic (SCHLAF18)
1995	Some Godz Die Young	CD EP, James Reality; expanded/reissued CD 1997, Fünfundvierzig (Fünfundvierzig 93)
1995	Seduction: Through the Past... Darkly	CD, Fünfundvierzig (Fünfundvierzig 66)
1995	Sopor	CD, Fünfundvierzig (Fünfundvierzig 89)
1995	Sonorous Invokations ov Brian Jones	10-inch EP, Manhood Records (RRR-SC) and cassette, HEXagone (HEX 3); reissued CD 1998, Fünfundvierzig (Fünfundvierzig 96)
1996	Seduction Thru the Past Darkly	Cassette, Inner-X-Musick (XXX 62)
1996	Sacrosanct	CD, Musica Maxima Magnetica (EEE 34)
1997	Liez in the Skyz	7” single, Klanggalerie (gg02)
1997	Sirkus	CD, Daft Records (D1024 CD)
1999	Sentinel Serenade	CD, Cleopatra Records (CLP 0480-2)
2000	"Kum Kleopatra"/"Nessus"	7-inch single, Membrum Debile Propaganda (MDP 6000-44)
2004	SleepSirkle	CDR, Inner-X-Musick
2009	Soundtrax	CD, Inner-X-Musick (XXX 001 DVD)
2009	Sorcery, Spells & Serpent Charms	CD, Klanggalerie (gg132)
2009	Stolen Sleep	CD, Inner-X-Musick (IX-001)
2009	Species Interruptus Vol. 1 (The Best of the German 97 Tour)	CDr, Inner-X-Musick (XXX 002)
2010	Stratocast	CDr, Inner-X-Musick (XXX 68)
2010	Live at the Limelight	DVDR, Inner-X-Musick (DVD XXX 05)
2010	SixSixSix	Box set (4 LPs, 7-inch, booklet), Vinyl on Demand (VOD79)
2010	Stolas: Live at Chets Last Call 10/03/1984	CDr, Inner-X-Musick (XXX 66)
2010	Silver Star/Merry X-Mas	CDr EP, Inner-X-Musick (XXX X01)
2011	"Vinyl Venom Vixen"	Digital single, Inner-X-Musick (XXX-DLPROMO-2011.1, XXX-FD02)
2011	"The Sun May Speak of Pleasures"	Digital single, Inner-X-Musick (XXX-DLPROMO-2011.2, XXX-FDO3)
2011	Sacrifice Vol. 1	CDr, Inner-X-Musick (XXX X65)
2011	Striptease	CDr, Inner-X-Musick (XXX X59)
2011	"Scopolamine Doses"	Digital single, Inner-X-Musick (XXX-DLPROMO-2011.3)
2011	Sleeping Sickness #2	DVDR, Inner-X-Musick (DVD XXX 06)
