= Colonia (Autopsia album) =

2002 studio album

Studio album by Autopsia
- Released: May 2002
- Recorded: 1991–1996, at Prague
- Genre: Minimal music, Industrial, Neoclassical, Soundscape
- Length: 64:45
- Label: Staalplaat (STCD158)
- Producer: Autopsia,

Autopsia chronology
| Secret Block For A Secret Person In Ireland (1999) | Colonia (2002) | The Berlin Requiem (2006) |

Professional ratings
Review scores
| Source | Rating |
|---|---|
| fluxeuropa.com | (not rated) |

Colonia is a compilation album by Autopsia, released by Staalplaat in Amsterdam, 2002.

== Track listing ==
1. Je suis la Resurrection, the main theme from The Pillow Book (film)
2. The Fortress Europe
3. King og heretics
4. Welt ist won Ertz
5. Car Dieu a tant aime le monde
6. Abfall und Aufsteig
7. The secret block for a secret person in Ireland
8. Wom Jasagen
9. Blue of Noon
