= Discipline Manifesto =

Studio album by Naer Mataron
- Released: 2005
- Genre: Black metal
- Length: 59:13
- Label: Black Lotus Records

Naer Mataron chronology
Awaken in Oblivion (2004)	Discipline Manifesto (2005)	Praetorians (2008)

Professional ratings
Review scores
Source	Rating
Metal Temple review	4/5 stars

Discipline Manifesto is the fourth full-length studio album, and seventh album overall, by the black metal band Naer Mataron. It was released in 2005 on Black Lotus Records.

== Track listing ==
1. Extreme Unction - 9:43
2. Blessing of Sin - 7:51
3. For the New Man - 3:04
4. Arrival of the Cesar - 5:58
5. Blast Furnace - 4:54
6. The Day Is Breaking - 7:00
7. The Last Loyal - 5:27
8. Land of Dreams - 6:01
9. Last Man Against Time - 9:15
