= Hirsute Pursuit =

American band

- Origin: New York, New York, United States
- Genres: Industrial, EDM, trip hop, experimental, electronic
- Years active: 2007-present
- Labels: Cold Spring, Up & Coming Records, Old Europa Cafe
- Members: Harley Phoenix, Bryin Dall

Hirsute Pursuit is an American industrial/EDM music group from New York City, formed by Bryin Dall and Harley Phoenix in 2006-2007. They frequently collaborate with artists such as Peter Christopherson (before his death in 2010) and Boyd Rice. Thematically, they focus on homosexuality, gay sex, and the gay bear subculture. Due to the controversial and explicit nature of many of their songs, their videos have frequently been removed from YouTube. They are known for their cover of David Bowie's 1979 song Boys Keep Swinging with Boyd Rice on vocal.

== Live performances ==
Hirsute Pursuit's live performances often contain overt displays of bondage and sex acts, with Phoenix usually dressed in full leather gear, including mask. Explicit and pornographic images are usually projected behind them.

== Discography ==
=== Studio albums ===
- That Hole Belongs To Me (2007)
- Tighten That Muscle Ring (July 10, 2012)
- Revel In Your Ability To Accessorize My Pleasure (2013)

=== EPs ===
- Boyd Keeps Swinging (September 16, 2012)
