= The Pillow Book (film) =

1996 erotic drama film

- Theatrical release poster
- Directed by: Peter Greenaway
- Written by: Peter Greenaway
- Produced by: Kees Kasander
- Starring: Vivian Wu; Ewan McGregor; Ken Ogata; Yoshi Oida; Hideko Yoshida; Judy Ongg
- Cinematography: Sacha Vierny
- Edited by: Peter Greenaway; Chris Wyatt
- Music by: Brian Eno
- Production companies: Alpha Films; Channel Four Films; Delux Productions; Kasander & Wigman Productions; Le Studio Canal+; Woodline Films
- Distributed by: PolyGram Filmed Entertainment (Netherlands); FilmFour distributors (United Kingdom); Pyramide Distribution (France)
- Release dates: 12 May 1996 (Cannes); 8 November 1996 (United Kingdom); 15 January 1997 (France); 20 October 1997 (Netherlands)
- Running time: 126 minutes
- Countries: Netherlands; United Kingdom; France; Luxembourg
- Languages: English; Cantonese; Italian; Japanese; Mandarin; French
- Box office: $2.4 million

The Pillow Book is a 1996 erotic drama art film written and directed by Peter Greenaway, which stars Vivian Wu as Nagiko, a Japanese model in search of pleasure and new cultural experience from various lovers. The film is a melding of dark modern drama with idealised Chinese and Japanese cultural themes and settings, and centres on body painting.

== Plot ==
The film's title, "The Pillow Book", refers to an ancient Japanese diary written by Sei Shōnagon, whose actual name is believed to have been Kiyohara Nagiko, from whence the protagonist's name in the film.

The film is narrated by Nagiko, a Japanese-born model living in Hong Kong. Nagiko seeks a lover who can match her desire for carnal pleasure with her admiration for poetry and calligraphy. The roots of this obsession lie in her youth in Kyoto, when her father would write characters of good fortune on her face. Nagiko's father celebrates her birthday retelling the Japanese creation myth and writing on her flesh in beautiful calligraphy, while her aunt reads a list of "beautiful things" from Sei Shōnagon's Pillow Book. Nagiko's aunt tells her that when she is twenty-eight years old, the official book of observations will be officially 1000 years old, and that she, Nagiko, will be the same age as Sei Shōnagon when she had written the book (in addition to sharing her first name). Nagiko also learns around this time that her father is in thrall to his publisher, "Yaji-san", who demands sexual favours from her father in exchange for publishing his work.

=== Early chapters ===
The publisher arranges Nagiko's wedding to his young apprentice. Her husband, an expert archer, resents Nagiko's love for books and her desire to read, in spite of his apprenticeship. He also refuses to indulge in her desires for pleasure, refusing to write on her body. When he discovers and reads Nagiko's pillow book, he is extremely resentful, setting it on fire and thus setting fire to their marital home, an event which Nagiko describes to be the 'first major fire of [her] life.' Insulted and enraged, Nagiko leaves him for good.

Hiding from her husband, Nagiko moves to Hong Kong. In spite of her aversion to the practice, she learns how to type to find work. Outside her apartment, a group of activists regularly protest the publishing industry for the depletion of forests due to the need to make paper.

After working as a secretary in the office of a Japanese fashion designer for a while, Nagiko's employer takes a liking to her and makes her one of his models. As a successful fashion model, Nagiko hires a maid, as she now finally has the opportunity to explore her sexual desires of being written on. However, after several affairs, she feels dissatisfied with them all: either they have great penmanship and are lousy lovers, or vice versa.

One day, at the Cafe Typo, Nagiko's favourite haunt, she meets Jerome, a British translator. Intrigued by his knowledge, they go to a private space where she has Jerome write on her body in various languages. In spite of her interest, Nagiko dislikes Jerome's handwriting and orders him out. Jerome totally shocks Nagiko, however, when he asks her to teach him, offering her to write on his body. Opening his shirt, he offers Nagiko to "Use my body like the pages of a book. Of your book!". Nagiko has never considered this aspect in her desires before: her lovers always write on her body. When she backs out and runs, Jerome laughs at her.

Frightened but very intrigued by Jerome's suggestion, Nagiko has several one-night stands in which she experiments writing on their bodies. One of the activists, admirer Hoki, a Japanese photographer who adores her, begs Nagiko to take him as a lover. She explains she can't, as his skin's no good for writing: whenever she writes on him, the ink smears and runs. Hoki, not wanting Nagiko to keep carrying on like she is, suggests she try writing a book, offering to take it to a renowned publisher he freelances for. Nagiko likes this idea and writes her first book.

Nagiko's book is returned, being told the book is "not worth the paper it's written on!". Insulted, Nagiko follows the address on the envelope to confront the publisher. Nagiko is shocked to discover that the publisher who rejected her work is in fact Yaji-san, her father's old publisher. What's more, the publisher has a young lover: Jerome.

Devising a plan, Nagiko decides that she will get to the publisher through Jerome. Meeting up with Jerome again, Nagiko discovers he has learned a few more languages, and his penmanship has greatly improved. Nagiko and Jerome spend several weeks exploring this, writing on each other and making love. Nagiko soon realises that, in Jerome, she has found the perfect lover she has been searching for: the partner with whom she can share her physical and her poetic passion, using each other's bodies as tablets for their art.

=== Writing of books 1 – 6 ===
Nagiko tells Jerome the truth and the whole story with the publisher. Jerome comes up with an idea: Nagiko will write her book on Jerome's body and Jerome will take it to the publisher. Nagiko loves the idea and writes Book 1: The Book of The Agenda, in intricate characters of black, red, and gold, on Jerome, keeping her identity anonymous. The plan is a success: Jerome sees the publisher and exhibits the book on his nude body, and the impressed publisher has his scriveners copy down the text.

After telling Nagiko of the plan's success, Jerome tells Nagiko that he'll return to her as soon as the publisher, who was extremely aroused by the experience, lets him go. However, during his time with the publisher, Jerome appears to lose track of time and doesn't return to Nagiko. Nagiko, jealous, impatient, and angry, searches for Jerome, eventually finding him making love with the publisher. Nagiko takes this as rejection and betrayal of the worst kind, and immediately plots revenge.

On two Swedish tourists, Nagiko writes Book 2: The Book of The Innocent and Book 3: The Book of the Idiot. Shortly afterwards, an old man is running naked through the streets from the publisher's shop, bearing Book 4: The Book of Impotence/Old Age. Book 5: The Book of the Exhibitionist is delivered by a boorish, fat, hyperactive American (Tom Kane; who was actually more interested in Hoki than Nagiko).

Nagiko's revenge is a success. Jerome is furiously jealous and comes to Nagiko's home to confront her. Nagiko refuses to meet him, however, and won't let Jerome in. Jerome's outrage soon turns to desperation as he begs her to talk to him, but she won't.

Jerome sinks into deep depression and meets with Hoki at the Cafe Typo, desperate to find a way to get Nagiko to forgive him. Hoki suggests that he "scare" Nagiko by faking suicide, similar to the fake death scene in Romeo and Juliet and gives Jerome some pills.

Arriving at Nagiko's home while she is away, Jerome takes some of the pills, then writes a page, as if writing a book. Each time he takes some pills, he writes another page, keeping track of how many pills he takes on each page. As the pills take effect, Jerome can write no more and lies on the bed, naked, holding a copy of Sei Shōnagon's the book of observations.

The plan is a success: when Nagiko returns home and finds Jerome, she rushes to him, eager to renew their relationship and continue their plans. However, the plan has worked too well: Jerome has overdosed on the pills and is dead. Nagiko is devastated and realises how much she loved him. On his dead body, Nagiko writes Book 6: The Book of the Lovers.

At Jerome's funeral, his mother, a snobbish, upper-class woman, tells Nagiko that Jerome always loved things that were "fashionable". When she suggests that was probably why Jerome loved Nagiko, Nagiko strikes her.

Nagiko burns her possessions and moves back to Japan. After the funeral, the publisher secretly exhumes Jerome's body from the tomb and has Jerome's skin, still bearing the writing, flayed and made into a grotesque pillow book of his own. Nagiko learns of the publisher's actions and becomes distraught and outraged. She sends a letter to the publisher, still keeping her identity a secret, demanding that particular book from the publisher's hands in exchange for the remaining books. The publisher, now obsessed with his mysterious writer and her work, agrees.

=== Writing of books 7 – 13 ===
Nagiko, now pregnant with her and Jerome's child, writes Book 7: The Book of The Seducer on a male messenger. The writing on him is almost destroyed and undecipherable when the publisher accidentally leaves the messenger out in the rain. Book 8: The Book of Youth is delivered as a series of photographs. A young Buddhist monk then arrives bearing Book 9: The Book of Secrets written on all his "secret" spots: in between his fingers and toes, the insides of his thighs, etc.; the book is presented in the form of riddles. When the next messenger arrives, he is completely bare: no writing at all. The publisher and staff search for any hint of writing on the messenger's naked body. As the publisher dismisses him as a hoax, the man sticks out his tongue, bearing Book 10: The Book of Silence.

The activists' protests come to an end when their truck hits a young wrestler bearing Book 11: The Book of The Betrayed, right outside the publisher's office. The next messenger (Masaru Matsuda) simply drives by the office, giving little time to copy down Book 12: The Book of False Starts.

Finally, Book 13: The Book of the Dead arrives on the body of a Sumo wrestler. In the book writing on the body of the messenger, which the publisher carefully reads, Nagiko finally reveals her identity, confronting the publisher with his crimes: blackmailing and disgracing her father, "corrupting" her husband, as well as Jerome, and what he's done to Jerome's corpse. The publisher, greatly shamed and humbled by being confronted with his guilt, hands the pillow book made of Jerome's skin to the messenger, then has the messenger slit his throat.

Upon recovering the book made out of Jerome's skin, Nagiko buries it under a Bonsai tree and life goes on. She has given birth to Jerome's child and is shown in the epilogue writing on her child's face, like her father used to do when she was young and quoting from her own pillow book. It is now Nagiko's 28th birthday.

Nagiko's bi-cultural heritage plays a key role in this film. As a half-Chinese and half-Japanese woman, Nagiko navigates her dual cultures through physical and psychological exploration. Greenaway portrays this exploration subtly by mixing and switching Asian iconography.

== Cast ==
- Vivian Wu as Nagiko
  - Miwako Kawai as young Nagiko
  - Chizuru Ohnishi as young Nagiko
  - Shiho Takamatsu as young Nagiko
  - Aki Ishimaru as young Nagiko
- Ewan McGregor as Jerome
- Yoshi Oida as The Publisher
- Ken Ogata as The Father
- Hideko Yoshida as The Aunt / The Maid
- Judy Ongg as The Mother
- Ken Mitsuishi as The Husband
- Yutaka Honda as Hoki
- Barbara Lott as Jerome's mother
- Lynne Frances Wachendorfer as Jerome's sister
- Phil Sherry as Support role
- Helen Davison as a tourist

== Reception ==
The film was screened in the Un Certain Regard section at the 1996 Cannes Film Festival. Andrew Johnston stated: "Most of Greenaway's signature visual devices (elaborate title cards, superimposed images) are employed here; but accompanied by U2 songs and traditional Asian music, instead of a Michael Nyman score, they seem fresher and more dynamic than before. The actors are required to submit completely to Greenaway's mechanics, but there isn't one bad performance. McGregor and Oida (as a venal publisher) are especially fine."

Reviews were mixed to positive. On the review aggregator website Rotten Tomatoes, 68% of 56 critics' reviews are positive, with an average rating of 6.9/10. The website's consensus reads: "The Pillow Book is undeniably sensual and visually ravishing, but the film's narrative lacks the hypnotic pull of its imagery." Metacritic, which uses a weighted average, assigned the film a score of 64 out of 100, based on 20 critics, indicating "generally favorable" reviews.

The film opened on 12 screens in the UK (including 6 in London), grossing £70,458 in its opening weekend and finishing in 14th place but with the highest per-screen average of £5,872. In London, it was the second highest-grossing film for the weekend behind Michael Collins with a gross of £53,925. In the US, the film opened on 7 screens and grossed $105,922, for a large per-screen average of $15,132 and went on to gross $2.4 million.

== Soundtrack ==
- Autopsia-Colonia CD Including main theme from The Pillow Book film, Staalplaat
- "Offering to the Saviour Gompo", Performed by Buddhist Lamas & Monks of the Four Great Orders, Courtesy of Lyrichord Disks New York
- "A Buddhist Prayer", Performed by Buddhist Lamas & Monks of the Four Great Orders, Courtesy of Lyrichord Disks New York
- "Invocations of Gompo", Performed by Buddhist Lamas & Monks of the Four Great Orders, Courtesy of Lyrichord Disks New York
- "Ranryo Ou", Court music of Japan, Performed by Tokyo Gakuso, Courtesy of Victor Entertainment
- "Nasori", Court music of Japan, Performed by Tokyo Gakuso, Courtesy of Victor Entertainment
- "Manzairaku", Court music of Japan, Performed by Tokyo Gakuso, Courtesy of Victor Entertainment
- "Wedding Song", Performed by A Village Ensemble, Aqcha, Afghanistan, Courtesy of Topic Records Lrd
- "Blonde", Performed by Guesch Patti & E. Daho, Courtesy of EMI Music Publishing France SA
- "La Marquise", Performed by Guesch Patti & Dimitri Tikovoi, Courtesy of EMI Music Publishing France SA
- "La Chinoise", Performed by Guesch Patti & Dimitri Tikovoi, Courtesy of EMI Music Publishing France SA
- "Taimu-Mashin no nai Jidai", Performed by Cawai Miwako, Courtesy of Fun house Publishers, Inc
- "Daddy's Gonna Pay For Your Crashed Car", Written by U2, Performed by U2, Courtesy of Polygram International
- "Sinfonia Concertante in A Fur Violine, Viola, Violoncello und Orchester", Written by Wolfgang Amadeus Mozart, reconstructor Shigeaki Saegusa, Performed by Mozarteum Orchester Salzburg, conductor Hans Graf, Courtesy of May Music, Japan
- "Valse", extract from The First String Quartet "La Théorie", Written by Walter Hus, Performed by Quadro Quartet, Courtesy of Het Gerucht / Uncle Dan's
- "Je suis la resurrection", Performed by Autopsia, Courtesy of Hypnobeat Records
- "Ai no Meguriai", Performed by Judy Ongg, Courtesy of Nichion
- "Qui Tolis", Extract from "Rome", Written by Patrick Mimran, Performed by James Bowman, Courtesy of Wisteria Publishing, Amsterdam
- "Rose, Rose, I Love You", Performed by Yao Lee, Courtesy of EMI SE Asia Ltd
- "Teki wa Ikuman", Performed by Ichiro Wakahara, Courtesy of King Records
- "Aiba Shingun-ka", Performed by Hachiro Kasuga, Courtesy of King Records
- "Chicken Bandit-The-Blistered-Corn", Performed by Lam Man Chun and Eric Tsang, Courtesy of New Melody Publishing/Bird and Child Ltd
- "Suiren", Performed by Yasuaki Shimizu, Courtesy of Nippon Columbia Berlin

== See also ==
- Body painting
- Nudity in film (East Asian cinema)
