= Naer Mataron =

Greek black metal band

- Also known as: Nar Mataron
- Origin: Athens, Greece
- Genre: Black metal
- Years active: 1994–2020
- Labels: Black Lotus Records; Season of Mist
- Members: Warhead; Kaiadas; Indra
- Past members: Efialtis; Morfeas; Vicotnik
- Website: http://www.naermataron.eu/

Naer Mataron is a Greek black metal band which draws on imagery from Greek mythology. The band was formed in 1994 after splitting from Nar Mataron, and was soon signed to Black Lotus Records, with whom they released four studio albums. Moving through numerous line-ups, the band has seen influences from other genres of music, including a traditional black metal release and songs featuring elements of melodic black metal and industrial music.

In 2007, the band signed with Season of Mist, with whom they released their most recent album. The current line-up includes founding member bassist Kaiadas, former DHG vocalist Vicotnic, and drummer Warhead.

The band has been labeled as part of the National Socialist black metal scene, although it is not typically labeled as such. The connection to the scene is drawn chiefly due to the activities of Kaiadas, real name Giorgos Germenis, who was formerly a member of the National Socialist black metal band Der Stürmer and who held a seat in the Greek parliament as a member of the far-right and neo-fascist criminal organization Golden Dawn. In 2017, the band performed at the festival Asgardsrei.

== History ==
Naer Mataron was formed in 1994 from Nar Mataron. Nar Mataron had formed earlier that year, and after the release of two demos, Tales of the Twelve Gods and The Awakening of Ancient Greece, the band split in two. The vocalist, Lord Alatoth, carried on with Nar Mataron, while guitarist/bassist Morpheas, with fellow Naer Mataron member Kaiadas, formed Naer Mataron, leading to accusations from Lord Alatoth that Naer Mataron had stolen his songs and band name. Naer Mataron refers to this early period in its history by saying there were "line up changes and personal conflicts" before its first release. Morpheas took on vocal duties, and the band's first promo, "The Great God Pan", was released in 1997, leading to a deal with Black Lotus Records. Before the release of the band's first album the following year, Aither joined the band as the vocalist/drummer, and then Aither and Morpheas each left the band. Naer Mataron's first full-length album, Up from the Ashes, featured Efialtis on vocals, Kaiadas on bass and Lethe (session) on drums. Aither subsequently rejoined the band as vocalist, appearing on the 2000 release Skotos Aenaon (which translates from Ancient Greek as "endless darkness"), and then took on drumming duties (moving Lethe to keyboards) when Morpheas returned to the band. Despite the line-up changes, Naer Mataron remained extremely active in terms of performances, and opened for several major black metal acts, including Mayhem and Rotting Christ.

In 2001, the band produced a 7-inch vinyl EP named A Holocaust in Front of God's Eyes in a one-off deal with Aphelion Productions. The release was limited to 500 copies, and the band intended it to be "old school black metal", in contrast with their usual style. This was followed by 2003's River at Dash Scalding, recorded at Praxis Studio, featuring faster and heavier drum work from official drummer Warhead. Warhead has been credited as "the fastest drummer on the continent", and has been described by the band as "an inspiration" with "inexhaustible talent". The album was given 2.5 out of 5 by Eduardo Rivadavia of Allmusic, who said that "Naer Mataron are bound to convert a few additional fans to their cause, but casual metal fans are likely to emerge from this aural lambasting somewhat nonplussed." Following the release, Naer Mataron performed with bands including Rotting Christ and Gorgoroth.

2004 saw several releases. Aghibasiin-Lessons on How To Defeat Death was a collection of demos and unreleased tracks compiled by Shadow Face Records, limited to 1000 copies, while Up from the Ashes and River at Dash Scalding both saw limited edition rereleases. 2004 also saw performances with Dissection, and the headlining of the Winter Storm Festival in Bulgaria. In early 2004, Nordvargr, who had previously written music for River at Dash Scalding, joined the band. The band then recorded Discipline Manifesto, both in Athens, Greece and Oslo, Norway. Released by Black Lotus Records, the album was described as "amazing, absolutely amazing" by Vampire Magazine, with the atmosphere, vocals and music all being praised.

In May 2006, Morpheas left the band and moved to Norway, and was replaced by DHG's Vicotnik, who had previously worked with the band on Discipline Manifesto. In March 2007, it emerged that the band had signed with Season of Mist, and Naer Mataron was quote by Blabbermouth.net as saying-

The last period was really victorious for NAER MATARON. We composed the harshest and most extreme music we ever had for our new album. So the next big step was taken, as we are now proud to announce our signing to Season of Mist. We are more strong and enthusiastic than ever before and feel that we are also supported henceforth in the same spirit. To this point, we wish to extend our salute to the hordes that supported our black metal war machine throughout the last 13 years and especially thank Michael and Season of Mist for giving us the chance to deliver what will be the most extreme and uncompromising work of NAER MATARON to date.

Naer Mataron's first release with Season of Mist, Praetorians, was released in 2008. The album was received positively, with Roel De Haan of Lords of Metal saying it "is tightly executed, has an icy production, the works", but that the album is lacking punch and truly memorable moments", giving the album a score of seventy out of one hundred.

The current line-up is Kaiadas on bass, Warhead on drums, Vicotnik as vocalist and Indra on guitars.

Since the Greek legislative election of May 2012, Kaiadas, or Giorgos Germenis from his real name, has been elected as a member of the Greek Parliament with the nationalist far-right Golden Dawn party. He was taken to custody in January 2014 on charges of joining and directing a criminal organization. He was released in the summer of 2015. On the 7th of October 2020, Kaiadas was sentenced to 10 years in prison for being a member of the neo-fascist criminal organization Golden Dawn.

== Musical style ==
Naer Mataron play extreme black metal with strong lyrical influences from Greek mythology, which has led to their style being referred to as "Hellenic Black Metal". The band's music uses instruments standard to black metal- with guitars, bass guitars, drums and keyboards all used. Unusually, some of the band's vocals are made up of "clean" singing, as well as the more usual death grunts. Certain songs have also shown elements of melodic black metal, and industrial elements reminiscent of singer Vicotnik's previous band, Dødheimsgard.

== Band members ==
Final lineup

- Georgios Germenis – bass (1994–2020) vocals (2007, 2012–2020
- Sotiris S. – guitar (2003–2020)
- Jonathan Garofoli – drums (2009–2020)

Previous members

- Michael Siouzios – guitar (1994–2006) vocals (2000–2006)
- Nikos Tsovilis – vocals (1998, 2000) drums (2000–2003)
- Terry Eleftheriou – drums (2003–2009)
- Henrik Lennart Nordvargr Björk – keyboard (2004–2012)
- Yusaf Parvez – vocals (2006–2012)

== Discography ==
- 1994 – Tales of the Twelve Gods (demo, as Nar Mataron)
- 1995 – The Awakening of Ancient Greece (demo, as Nar Mataron)
- 1996 – The Great God Pan (promo)
- 1998 – Up from the Ashes (studio album, Black Lotus Records)
- 2000 – Skotos Aenaon (studio album, Black Lotus Records)
- 2001 – A Holocaust in Front of God's Eyes (EP, Aphelion Productions)
- 2003 – River at Dash Scalding (studio album, Black Lotus Records)
- 2004 – Aghibasiin-Lessons on How to Defeat Death (compilation album, Shadow Face Records)
- 2004 – Awaken in Oblivion (compilation album, Black Lotus Records)
- 2005 – Discipline Manifesto (studio album, Black Lotus Records)
- 2006 – Voice of Hate/Naer Mataron (split 7-inch EP, Temple of Darkness Records)
- 2008 – Praetorians (studio album, Seasons of Mist)
- 2012 – Εγώ ειμί το φώς του κόσμου (ep, World Terror Committee)
- 2012 – ΖΗΤΩ Ο ΘΑΝΑΤΟΣ (studio album, Witching Hour Productions)
- 2013 – Και ο λόγος σάρξ εγένετο (special album, Blackseed Productions)
- 2013 – Naergal (split 7-inch EP, Supreme Music Creations)
- 2016 – Nacht der drohenden Schatten
- 2018 – Lucitherion "Temple of the Radiant Sun"
