= Marmo =

Marmo is a surname. Notable people with the surname include:

- Alejandro Marmo, Argentine artist
- Malia Scotch Marmo (born 1955), American screenwriter and teacher,
- Philip Marmo (born 1951), Tanzanian politician and diplomat

== See also ==
- Colle Marmo
- Marble
- Burmantofts Pottery
