= Bisenti =

- Comune
- Comune di Bisenti
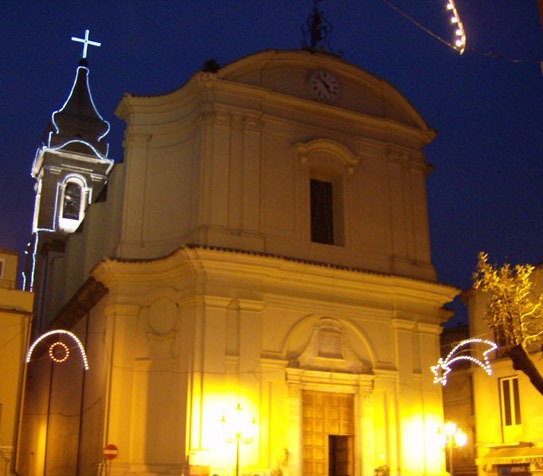
- Church of Santa Maria degli Angeli

- Coat of arms

- Location within Italy Location within Abruzzo
- Coordinates: 42°32′N 13°48′E
- Country: Italy
- Region: Abruzzo
- Province: Province of Teramo (TE)
- Frazioni: Acquadosso (aka Acquaddosso), Bivio Castelli (known locally as Cazzetti), Chioviano Alto, Chioviano Basso, Colle Marmo, Piedifinati, Rufiano, San Martino, San Nicola, San Pietro, Scipione, Troiano, Falone

Area
  - Total: 30 km^{2} (12 sq mi)
- Elevation: 274 m (899 ft)
- Highest elevation: 702 m (2,303 ft)

Population (1 January 2007)
  - Total: 2,061
  - Density: 69/km^{2} (180/sq mi)
- Time zone: UTC+1 (CET)
  - Summer (DST): UTC+2 (CEST)
- Postal code: 64033
- Dialing code: 0861
- Patron saint: Saint Pascal Baylon
- Saint day: 17 May
- Website: Official website

Bisenti (Bisentino: Bisìndë; Latin: Bisemptum or Biseptum) is a town and comune in Teramo province in the Abruzzo region of southern Italy.

== Church ==
The old face of Bisenti is still preserved in the streets and squares of the historic center, which holds the colorful atmosphere typical of a medieval village.

The Piazza Vittorio Emanuele overlooks the parish church of Santa Maria degli Angeli, which houses a majestic bell tower and the house badiale. According to tradition, the church is related to the Franciscan order. It was once considered one of the major basilicas of Abruzzo during the 15th-16th century. It can also be seen in a corner of the mosaic floor of the Basilica of St. Peter in Rome.

=== Legend ===
There is an old tradition linking the birthplace of Pontius Pilate to the village of Bisenti, Samnite territory, in today's Abruzzo region of Central Italy. There are ruins of a Roman house known as "The House of Pilate." Angelo Paratico wrote a chapter describing his birthplace and Pilate's meeting with Longinus every Easter.

== Frazione ==
- Colle Marmo

== Gallery ==
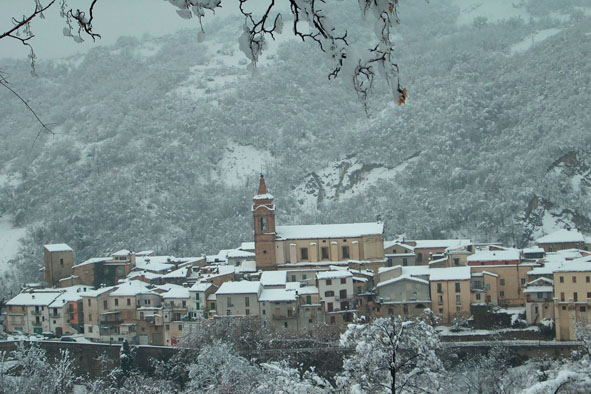
Bisenti south panorama

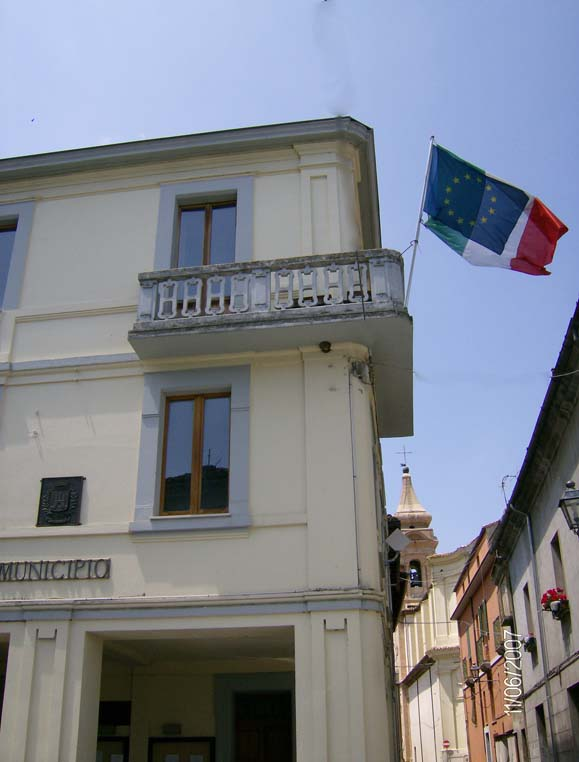
Bisenti Municipality

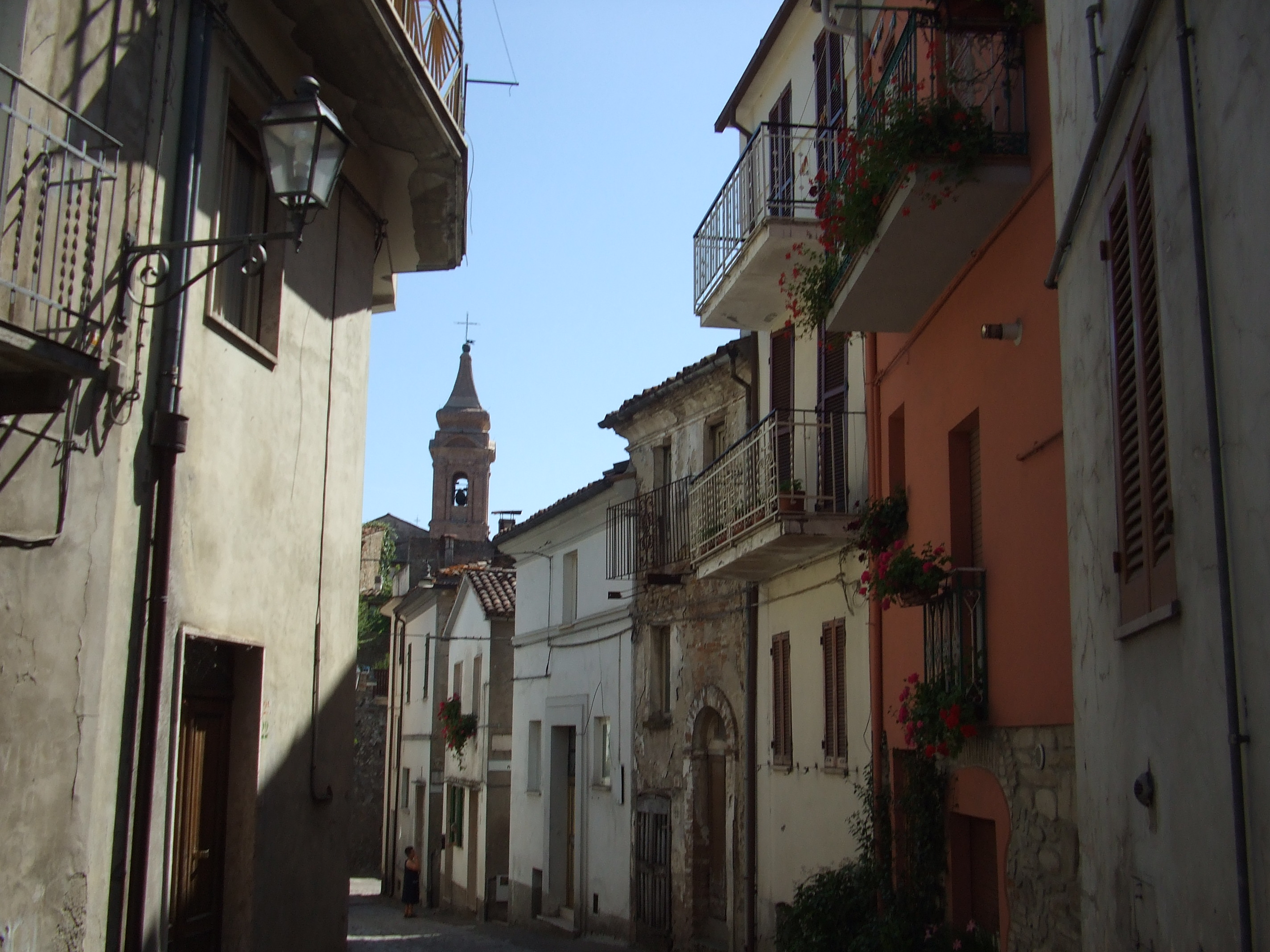
Church of Santa Maria degli Angeli
