= Autopsia =

European art project

Background information
- Origin: London, England; Ruma, Serbia, Yugoslavia; Prague, Czech Republic
- Genres: Experimental; electronic; contemporary classical
- Years active: 1978–present
- Labels: Produkcija Slovenija; Sound of Pig; Korm Plastics; Staalplaat; Flash and Bones Rec.; Gymnastic Records; Hypnobeat; Hyperion; Illuminating Technologies; Projekt; Old Europa Cafe
- Members: Karl Rossman; Jan Kruml; I.n. Cognito; V. Kapsa
- Past members: Dušan Đorđević-Mileusnić; Zlatko Sakulski; R. Milinković
- Website: autopsia.net

Autopsia is a European art project focused on music and visual production, gathering authors of different professions in the realization of multimedia projects. Its art practice began in London in the late 1970s and continued during the 1980s in the former Yugoslavia. Since 1990, Autopsia has been based in Prague, Czech Republic.

At the beginning of its activity, Autopsia issued dozens of mini-recordings. In the period after 1989, twenty CDs were issued, at first for Staalplaat, then for German label Hypnobeat and London's Gymnastic Records. One of its compositions is a part of the soundtrack for Peter Greenaway's The Pillow Book (1996).

== Discography ==
=== Studio albums ===
- Autopsia (1985)
- Oscularum Infame (1987)
- In Vivo 1981-1983 (1985)
- In Vivo (1988)
- International Aeterna (1988)
- Death Is the Mother of Beauty (1990)
- Palladium (1991)
- The Birth of the Crystal Power (1993)
- Humanity Is the Devil 1604–1994 (1995)
- Mystery Science (1996)
- The Berlin Requiem (2006)
- Radical Machines Night Landscapes (2008)
- Autopsia: Karl Rossmann Fragments (2008)
- Damnatio Memoriae (2017)
- Apophenia (2018)
- Innenräume (2020)
- Public Lesson in History (Exhibition Soundtrack) (2023)

=== EPs ===
- The Knife (1989)
- Requiem Pour un Empire (1991)
- Waldsinfonie: The Silence of the Lamb (1993)
- White Christmas (1994)
- Secret Christmas History (1995)
- The Secret Block For a Secret Person in Ireland (2002)
- Reconstructed EP Vol.1 (2020)
- Reconstructed EP Vol.2 (2020)
- Reconstructed EP Vol.3 (2020)
- Reconstructed EP Vol.4 (2020)
- Reconstructed EP Vol.5 (2020)
- God Has Come Again in the Form of an Oil Tank (2023)
- Resurrection Machines (2023)

=== Compilations ===
- Wound (1991)
- Prager Kodex (1995)
- In Vivo 1984–1992 (1998)
- Colonia (2002)
- Le Chant de la Nuit (2005)
- Factory Rituals (2008)
- Weltuntergang (2011)
- Metal (2015)
- In Vivo (2016)

=== Singles ===
- "Radical Machine /1.0/" (2005)
- "Silently the Wolves are Watching" (2007)

=== Other appearances ===
- "Song of Hate" (Swallowing Scrap Metal; 1984)
- "Lebensherrgabe" (SNX; 1985)
- "Lebensherrgabe" (Sounds Beyond the Grave – International Compilation; 1986)
- "The Eleventh Key" (19 Keys 19 Bands; 1986)
- "Relax" (Notre Dame; 1987)
- "Lebensherrgabe" (The Second Slovene Wave; 1987)
- "Kissing Jesus In The Dark, Part I" / "Kissing Jesus in the Dark, Part II" (Yugoslavian Sound Poetry; 1987)
- "Oh No! Hopeless!" (The Cassette Played Poptones; 1988)
- "Does the Knife Cry When It Enters the Skin" (Journey Into Pain; 1989)
- "Scars of Europe" (La Révolution... Électroacoustique; 1990)
- "Show Me Your Wound (Live)" (Mjölnir; 1990)
- "War in Heaven" (The Lamp of the Invisible Light; 1991)
- "Does the Knife Cry When It Enters the Skin"(Journey Into Pain; 1992)
- "His Secret Sin" (Made in Yugoslavia; 1992)
- "Erwachen Des Waldes" (Chang'e – Hyperium Asia Compilation; 1993)
- "Prologue" (Zauber of Music Volume II; 1995)
- "In Hora Mortis No.12 (Autopsia Arrangement)" / "Crowd Together and Work Up at the Sky" (Prager Kodex; 1995)
- "Damned" (Knights of Abyss; 1995)
- "Stille Nacht (g)RAVE Remix" (Excelsis – A Dark Noël; 1995)
- "Erwachen Des Waldes" (Hypnobeats; 1995)
- "Je suis La Resurrection" (The Pillow Book OST; 1996)
- "Erwachen Des Waldes" (Hyperium New Classics Vol. 1; 1997)
- "Erwachen Des Waldes" (Hypnotic & Hypersonic; 1998)
- "Stille Nacht (g)RAVE Remix" (Excelsis; 2001)
- "Nachtlandschaft" (Statement 1961; 2004)
- "Space Conquerer" (Энергия; 2007)
- "Fragment II" (OEC 100; 2008)
- "Pannonien" (Klangpostkarten Aus Südosteuropa; 2010)
- "Hudci" (Unite – A Gathering Of Strangers; 2010)

== Books ==
- Autopsia written by Vladimir Mattioni, published by The Museum of Contemporary Art of Vojvodina in Novi Sad (2012) ISBN 978-86-84773-97-7
- Apocrypha written by Autopsia, published by UPI2M Zagreb (2013) ISBN 978-953-7703-17-2
- Thanatopolis written by Alexei Monroe, published by Divus London (2016) ISBN 978-80-86450-91-9

== Videography ==
- The Czech Book of the Dead (Illuminating Technologies; 2006)
- Flamme (Illuminating Technologies; 2006)
- Factory Rituals (Illuminating Technologies; 2009)
- Karl Rossmann Fragments (Illuminating Technologies; 2010)
- Autopsia Short Films (Illuminating Technologies; 2010)
