= Praetorians (album) =

Studio album by Naer Mataron
- Released: 2008
- Genre: Black metal
- Length: 59:16
- Label: Season of Mist

Naer Mataron chronology
Discipline Manifesto (2005)	Praetorians (2008)

Professional ratings
Review scores
Source	Rating
Lords of Metal Review	70/100

Praetorians is the fifth full length studio album, and eighth album overall, released by the black metal band Naer Mataron. It was released on the Season of Mist label in 2008, the first album by Naer Mataron on this label.

== Track listing ==
1. Anti-Celestial Campaign – 1:09
2. Ostara – 5:52
3. Sun Wheel – 7:50
4. Death Cast a Shadow over You – 5:46
5. Secret Heritage – 7:20
6. Astral Anthology – 0:43
7. Sol Invictus – 4:59
8. Incarcerating Gallantry – 4:44
9. The Eternal Pest – 6:51
10. Eagle's Nest – 4:44
11. Praetorians – 9:18
