= Old Europa Cafe =

Italian independent record label

- Founded: 1983
- Founder: Rodolfo Protti
- Genre: Electronic, industrial, ambient
- Country of origin: Italy
- Location: Pordenone
- Official website: www.oldeuropacafe.com

Old Europa Cafe is an Italian independent record label and mail order service specializing in ambient music, noise music, electronic music, and industrial music. It is based in Pordenone. Originating in the early 1980s Old Europa Cafe began as a small cassette label. Some of the original Old Europa Cafe artists included De Fabriek, Mauro Teho Teardo, and Brume. According to founder Rodolfo Protti, Old Europa Cafe has two guidelines for musick it releases—uncompromising industrial sounds and esoteric dark ambient styles.

== Notable artists ==
- ᚾᛟᚢ ᛁᛁ // ᚦᛟᚦ ᚷᛁᚷ
- Peter Andersson
- Atomine Elektrine
- Atrax Morgue
- Aube
- Aural Rage
- Autopsia
- Bad Sector
- Vittore Baroni
- Maurizio Bianchi
- Big City Orchestra
- Black Leather Jesus
- Bøltorn
- C-Drík
- Monty Cantsin
- Joe Carnation
- A Challenge of Honour
- Cleaners from Venus
- Coil
- Tony Conrad
- Deutsch Nepal
- DG 307
- Drool
- Econocon
- Electric Sewer Age
- Endura
- Folkstorm
- The Gaz (Plyn)
- Gen Ken Montgomery
- Randy Greif
- Grismannen
- Grunt
- The Haters
- Hirsute Pursuit
- Hydra Head 9
- Incapacitants
- Incinerator International
- Intrinsic Action
- GX Jupitter-Larsen
- Kapotte Muziek
- Mikael Karlsson
- Konstruktivits
- The Legendary Pink Dots
- Macronympha
- Maeror Tri
- Mauthausen Orchestra
- MCH Band
- Merzbow
- Mz.412
- Naevus
- Nebulon
- Necrophorus
- Nocturnal Emissions
- Nordvargr
- Nordvargr / Drakh
- Nurse with Wound
- Edward ODowd
- Genesis Breyer P-Orridge
- Panzar
- Psychic TV
- Psychonaut 75
- Raison d'être
- Richard Ramirez
- Rapoon
- Graeme Revell
- Boyd Rice
- Sabled Sun
- Sacher-Pelz
- Sigillum S
- Sixth Comm
- Mark Solotroff
- Spiritual Front
- SPK
- Stratvm Terror
- Svenska Likbrännings Föreningen
- Mauro Teho Teardo
- Trepaneringsritualen
- Troum
- Voice of Eye
- John Zewizz

== See also ==
- List of record labels
- List of electronic music record labels
- Old europa cafe discography
