= The Berlin Requiem (album) =

2006 album

Studio album by Autopsia
- Released: June 2006
- Recorded: Spring 2006, at Prague
- Genres: Industrial, experimental, minimalism, soundscapes
- Length: 41:11
- Label: Old Europa Cafe (OECD 084)
- Producers: Autopsia, Mustakillah

Autopsia chronology
Radical Machine (2005)	The Berlin Requiem (2006)	Night Landscapes (2008)

Professional ratings
Review scores
Source	Rating
heathenharvest.com	link
side-line.com	link
connexionbizarre.net	link

The Berlin Requiem is an album by Autopsia, a Czech industrial/experimental music group.

== Track listing ==
1. "Funeral Music I" – 7:32
2. "Retorten Genese" – 9:41
3. "Funeral Music II" – 6:51
4. "Radical Machine 3.0" – 2:52
5. "Funeral Music III" – 4:08
6. "Sounds for Remembering Death" – 10:07

== Personnel ==
All tracks composed by Autopsia.

Musical

Performed by Dämmerung Orchestra

Technical

- Mustakillah Studio, Prague – engineering, mastering
- Cover design IkkONA
