= Voice of Eye =

American experimental music duo

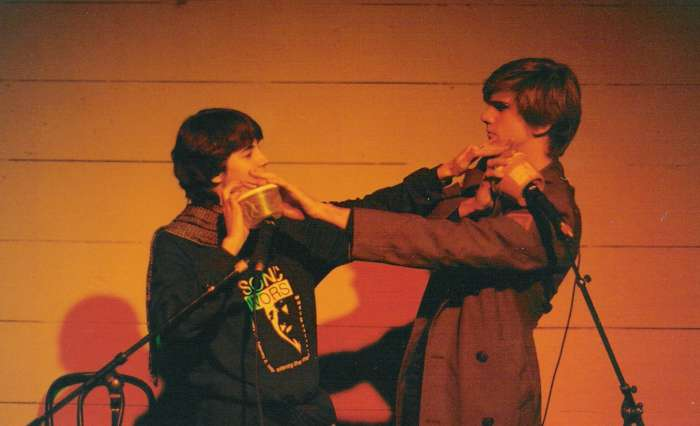

Background information
- Origin: Houston, Texas; Taos, New Mexico, U.S.
- Genres: Ambient; drone; ritual ambient; experimental; tribal; noise
- Years active: 1989-present
- Labels: Cyclotron Industries; Conundrum Unlimited; Transgradient Records; Vinyl On Demand; Taalem; Old Europa Cafe; Manifold Records
- Members: Bonnie Mcnairn: Jim Wilson
- Past members: Marlon Porter aka Elf Tranzporter; Ure Thrall; Paul Valsecchi
- Website: voiceofeye.com

Voice of Eye is a Taos, New Mexico based experimental ambient music duo whose members are Bonnie McNaim and Jim Wilson. Formed in 1989 in Houston, Texas, their sound is one that blends electronic soundscapes, dark ambient, drone, and world music, particularly with Middle Eastern overtones, and tends to evoke an atmospheric or shamanistic quality. Many of the instruments used are home-made or heavily modified. Using this "odd palette of instrumentation," their music has been described as "largely indescribable, but totally inviting."

A ten-year musical hiatus began in 1997 as the duo shifted their focus from music to building an off-the-grid sustainable earthship and studio in New Mexico. They returned to touring and recording music in 2007.

== History ==
Bonnie McNairn and Jim Wilson first began performing together in the experimental band Cruor with Ure Thrall and Tim Sternat in 1988. Ure Thrall and Jim Wilson originally formed Cruor in 1987 with a revolving lineup of members based on who had a PA system. Following the crucifixion of Ure Thrall, Sternat, Wilson and McNairn formed Esoterica Landscapes 7. This was an industrial noise band based around the embrace of chaos and "majik". Eventually the embrace of these elements took its toll and Voice of Eye was formed as a vehicle to explore profound aspects of consciousness using music as a shared tool for entering different states of being. "The motivation behind forming Voice of Eye was for us to connect to a deeper truth we first sensed within our music. This unformed presence first revealed itself to us through music and has continued to manifest, taking shape throughout our life’s journey and leading to profound mystery."

== Method ==
Voice of Eye process real-time acoustic events through electronic devices and digital manipulation to achieve their signature sonic atmospheres. They invent and construct many of the instruments heard on their recordings. The use of non-traditional, found, misappropriated, primal, and world instruments also play a prominent role in their music.

McNairn and Wilson feel that the physical translation of movement and breath into sound cannot be equaled. "To literally touch the vibration, to feel it in your body, is a magical feedback to the source of all sound, the timeless vibration of the Universe."

== Discography ==
- 2024, Falling, Digital Release, Conundrum Unlimited
- 2021, Anthology Three 1996–1998, Double CD, Double Cassette, Hand painted wooden box, amulet, ritual items, Black Mara Records, Russia
- 2021, Hearts in Darkness, Digital Release, Conundrum Unlimited
- 2021, IAMINDUST2008, Digital Release, Conundrum Unlimited
- 2021, The Hungry Void, Volume Three: Earth, Life Garden and Voice of Eye, Digital Release
- 2012, The Unveiling of Darkness, Voice of Eye and Thomas Dimuzio, CD, 6-Panel Digipack, Record Label Records RLR-35, USA
- 2011, Anthology Two 1992–1996, Double CD, Transgredient Records
- 2010, Anthology One 1989–1991, Double LP, Vinyl On Demand
- 2010, The Portland Improvisations, Conundrum Unlimited
- 2010, Fire of the Unitive Path::the three rivers::, NVVOE: Nux Vomica and Voice of Eye, CD, Full Color Artwork, Auricular Records auricd41 and Conundrum Unlimited cu4, USA
- 2010, Primaera, Voice of Eye, Mini CDr, Full Color Disc, Taalem alm62, France
- 2010, Emergence & Immersion, Voice of Eye, Double CD, Color 4-page Digifolder, Old Europa Cafe OECD123, Italy
- 2009, Invivo, Nux Vomica and Voice of Eye, Auricular Records, Digital Release
- 2009, Actualization, Troum / AsiaNova / Voice of Eye Also: Troum / S.Q.E. / Ure Thrall, CD, Live Collaborations 2007 and 2001, Discorporeality Recordings CD2, USA
- 2009, Seven Directions Divergent, CD, color Digipack, Conundrum Unlimited
- 2009, Substantia Innominata, 10" record, 39 minutes, clear vinyl with golden speckles, Limited Edition of 500, Drone Records
- 2007, Nicht-Wissen, Voice of Eye and Asia Nova, mini CDR, special edition of 100 for 2007 Tour, Old Europa Cafe
- 2007, Emergence: Improvisations Volume 1, CDR, special edition of 100 for 2007 Tour, Conundrum Unlimited
- 2007, Immersion: Improvisations Volume 2, CDR, special edition of 100 for 2007 Tour, Conundrum Unlimited
- 1999, The Nature of Sand, Illusion of Safety, Life Garden and Voice of Eye, CD, Manifold Records
- 1997, Live LASF, LP, Anomalous Records
- 1996, Narratives: Music for Fiction, Paul Schutze, Robert Rich and Voice of Eye, CD, Manifold Records
- 1995, Transmigration, CD, Cyclotron Industries
- 1995, Tryst #8, Big City Orchestra and Voice of Eye, Cassette, (Special Packaging of Many Things), UBUIBI
- 1995, The Hungry Void, Volume Two: Air, Life Garden and Voice of Eye, CD, Agni Music and Cyclotron Industries
- 1995, The Hungry Void, Volume One: Fire, Life Garden and Voice of Eye, CD, Agni Music and Cyclotron Industries
- 1995, Sprocket, 7" vinyl, Drone Records
- 1994, Vespers, CD, Cyclotron Industries
- 1992, Mariner Sonique, CD, Cyclotron Industries
- 1992, Resonant Fields/Hot Gypsy Fink, 90 minute Cassette, Cyclotron Industries
- 1991, Voice of Eye, 90 minute Cassette, Cyclotron Industries
- 1990, Isolation, 90 minute Cassette, Cyclotron Industries

== See also ==
- List of ambient music artists
