= Aghibasiin-Lessons on How to Defeat Death =

Aghibasiin-Lessons on How To Defeat Death

Compilation album by Naer Mataron
- Released: 2004
- Genre: Black metal
- Length: 44:37
- Label: Shadowface Releases

Naer Mataron chronology
River at Dash Scalding (2003)	Aghibasiin-Lessons on How To Defeat Death (2004)	Awaken in Oblivion (2004)

Aghibasiin-Lessons on How To Defeat Death is the first compilation album, and fifth album overall, by the black metal band Naer Mataron. It was originally released on Shadowface Releases in 2004 and limited to 1000 hand-numbered copies, but was later re-released on Anti-Xtian Terror Records and limited to 300 hand-numbered copies. The re-released version contains two bonus tracks.

== Track listing ==
1. Alchemist – 9:12
2. Zeus (Wrath Of The Gods) – 4:22
3. Zephyrous – 5:12
4. Winter War Memorial – 7:03
5. Iketis – 5:12
6. A Holocaust In Front Of God's Eyes – 4:54
7. Steppe – 6:10
8. Kalki The Avenger – Lightning And The Sun (Death) – 2:32
9. Iketis (bonus live video)
10. Diastric Fields Of War (bonus live video)
11. Faethon (bonus live video)
12. Skotos Aenaon (bonus live video)
13. Wolf Of Ions... (bonus live video)
