= Colle Marmo =

Coordinates: 42.5472°N 13.8019°E

- Frazione
- Interactive map of Colle Marmo
- Country: Italy
- Region: Abruzzo
- Province: Teramo
- Commune: Bisenti
- Time zone: UTC+1 (CET)
  - Summer (DST): UTC+2 (CEST)

Colle Marmo (Bisentino: Colli Màrme) is a frazione of Bisenti in the Province of Teramo in the Abruzzo region of Italy.
