= John Zewizz =

American industrial music performer (born 1955)

- Birth name: John McSweeney
- Also known as: Green Sex, Ze Wizz Kidz, Hidious in Strength, Women of the SS, Noizeclot, Cult Ov The Womb
- Born: August 15, 1955; Essex, England, UK
- Genres: Industrial
- Occupation(s): Musician, singer, songwriter
- Instrument(s): Vocals, violin, keyboards
- Years active: 1979–present
- Labels: Inner-X-Musick; FünfUndVierzig; Musica Maxima Magnetica; Klanggallerie; Old Europa Cafe
- Member of: Sleep Chamber
- Website: www.sleepchamber.info

John McSweeney, commonly known by his stage name John Zewizz, is a British-born American industrial music performer. Since the late 1970s, Zewizz has recorded hundreds of cassettes, LPs, vinyl, and CD releases. He has also worked as a video director, magazine publisher, and record label owner (Inner-X-Musick).

== Early life ==
John McSweeney was born in Essex, England on August 15, 1955. His family moved to the United States when McSweeney was an infant. McSweeney's love and knowledge of music grew through his high school years. Friends remember him as "the definitive rock and roll Impresario. If John didn't have the record, you didn't need to hear it.", During the 1970s McSweeney was the president of a Rolling Stone fan club called "Smooth". It was in the late 1970s McSweeney began listening to bands like Throbbing Gristle. This was a huge influence on his musical direction.

McSweeney began his musical career in the late 1970s performing as "John Cage" in various bands. In 1978, he recorded under the alias "Green Sex". The output was limited and by 1981 "Green Sex" ceased to exist. During this time John began going by the name John Zewizz (or John Ze'Wizz), and even briefly fronted a band called Ze Wizz Kidz in 1979 with friends Aero Cixal and Robert Catalono.

== Career ==
John Zewizz is the sole permanent member of the band Sleep Chamber. He has also recorded under the name "Green Sex", "Ze Wizz Kidz", "Hidious in Strength", "Women of the SS", "Noizeclot", "Cult Ov The Womb" as well as recording under his own name "John Zewizz". He has produced recordings by "Sleep Chamber", "Dokument", "The Product", "Daze OF Trance" and "Women of Sodom". Between 1981 and 2000, Zewizz released close to 100 recordings as the driving force behind Sleep Chamber. Sleep Chamber fell silent in 2000 as a result of Zewizz's drug addiction, but in 2007 Sleep Chamber reformed (now known as SLEEPCHAMBER) and began recording again.

During the early to mid-1980s Zewizz published a magazine called "The Other Sound". The magazine was used primarily as a propaganda vehicle for Inner-X-Musick artists, and music that was for sale in Zewizz 's record shop "Innersleeve Records". The magazine ran from late 1983 through 1986. Only 8 issues were made before the zine stopped production. A 9th issue was to be produced, but Zewizz could not finance the printing. The material was given to a third party who published them under the magazine name "Issue #9".

Zewizz has released 2 solo recordings during his career. In 1987 he released a solo cassette on Inner-X-Musick titled Passion Ov Pan, and in 2010 on the Old Europa Cafe label he released the CD 2012.

== Drug addiction ==
Zewizz admits that drugs played a large role in his life from the age of 14. During the 1990s he was addicted to heroin and by 2001 his music career had all but stopped because of this addiction. According to himself he was able to get clean in 2004 through use of "magick". Zewizz claims, "I had to use magick to break the bonds that drugs had on me. It waz part ov my being. Drugs became my world and everything in it. Only magick waz strong enough to focus my will and to direct my will into power."

== Murder investigation ==
In 1996, Zewizz was questioned for the murder of Karina Holmer, a Swedish au pair living in Boston. Karina's body was found in a dumpster not far from Zewizz's home. The police considered John a suspect, but no charges were ever brought. The accusation, coupled with a growing heroin addiction, quickly began to destroy the band and to lead Zewizz away from band mates and friends.

== Discography ==
As John Zewizz

Year	Title	Format Special Notes
1987	Passion Ov Pan	Cassette released on by Inner-X-Musick Catalog no. XXX 42
1988	Briley Zewizz	Cassette (split with Jonathan Briley) released on by Inner-X-Musick No Catalog no.
2010	2012	CD released on by Old Europa Cafe Catalog no. OECD 130

As a member Of Sleep Chamber (See Sleep Chamber)

As Hidious in Strength

Year	Title	Format Special Notes
1982	Soundtrack To Forever	Cassette released on by Inner-X-Musick Catalog no. XXX 07
1982	Line of Souls	Cassette released on by Inner-X-Musick Catalog no. XXX 08
1983	Industrial Suffocation	Cassette released on by Inner-X-Musick Catalog no. XXX-C2
1983	Nun with a Gun	Cassette released on by Inner-X-Musick Catalog no. XXX-C3
1983	As Recorded Live	Cassette released on by Inner-X-Musick Catalog no. XXX-C5
1984	Stranger Days	Cassette released on by Inner-X-Musick Catalog no. XXX 15
1984	Eyes See To This	Cassette released on by Inner-X-Musick No Catalog no.
1984	Slow & Painful Sex	Cassette released on by Inner-X-Musick No Catalog no.
1984	Nun with a Gun/Gut Grip	7" Single released on by Tuff Enuff Catalog no.TE 0816
1985	Cold Dark Tales A Smell of Death	Cassette released on by Inner-X-Musick No Catalog no.
1985	Within Wires	Cassette released on by Inner-X-Musick Catalog no. XXX 41
1985	Mahcanik	Cassette released on by Inner-X-Musick Catalog no. XXX 32
1985	An Anthology	Cassette released on by Inner-X-Musick No Catalog no.

As Women of the SS

Year	Title	Format Special Notes
1984	Women of the SS	Cassette released on by Inner-X-Musick Catalog no. XXX 09
1985	Women of the SS #2 (AKA Woman Iz Beast)	Cassette released on by Inner-X-Musick Catalog no. XXX 20
1985	Possession of the Matrix	7 Inch Single released on by Inner-X-Musick Catalog no. XXX-SEX-1
1985	Rigor Romance	Cassette released on by Inner-X-Musick Catalog no. XXX 25
1985	Women of the SS	Cassette X 2 released on by Inner-X-Musick Catalog no. XXX 20
1986	The Call To All Women	Cassette released on by Inner-X-Musick Catalog no. XXX 43
1988	Ov Pure Blood	Cassette released on by Inner-X-Musick No Catalog no.
1991	SS Orgy/SS Bitch	7 Inch Single released on by Inner-X-Musick Catalog no. U30912M
1991	Women of the SS	Picture Disc released on by RRRecords Catalog no. RRR-XXX
1991	Untitled (AKA Themes)	7 Inch Single released on by RRRecords No Catalog no.
1999	John Zewizz Presents His Infamous Women of the SS	CD released on by RRRecords Catalog no. RRR-CD-07/2005 released on by RRRecords No Catalog no./2009 released on by Inner-X-Musick Catalog no.XXX 73

As Noiseclot

Year	Title	Format Special Notes
1984	Music For Torture, Bondage & Leather Sex	Cassette released on by Inner-X-Musick Catalog no. XXX 10
1985	Beyond Agony	Cassette released on by Inner-X-Musick Catalog no. XXX 22
1985	Bloodclot	Cassette with Controlled Bleeding released on by Inner-X-Musick Catalog no. XXX 24
1985	Death Dokument	Cassette released on by Inner-X-Musick Catalog no. XXX 31

As Cult Ov Womb

Year	Title	Format Special Notes
19846	Cult of the Womb	Cassette released on by Inner-X-Musick Catalog no. XXX 32
19856	Cult Ov The Womb	Cassette released on by Inner-X-Musick Catalog no. XXX 36
