= The Berlin Requiem (Weill) =

1928 musical composition by Kurt Weill

The Berlin Requiem (German: Das Berliner Requiem) is a 1928 cantata for tenor, baritone, and choir of three male voices and orchestra by Kurt Weill to poems by Bertolt Brecht. The work had been commissioned by the Reichs-Rundfunk-Gesellschaft who intended to broadcast the work on all its stations. However Brecht failed to abide by his contractual obligation to show the poems to the commissioning body for advance approval and the content, some of it a memorial to Rosa Luxemburg, led to several stations banning the performance.

Weill took a commission from Radio Frankfurt, producing the Berlin Requiem based on some of Brecht's poems. A specific theme of the chosen texts is the forgotten dead, "faceless war casualties, or victims of violent crime whose bodies are disposed of in an undetected location", according to one writer. Some of the musical portion is quite spartan, with, for example, much of "Ballade vom ertrunkenen Mädchen" accompanied solely by guitar.

== Movements ==
1. Grosser Dankchoral: Lobet die Nacht (Great Chorale of Thanksgiving)
2. Ballade vom ertrunkenen Mädchen: Als sie ertrunken war und hinunterschwamm (Ballad of the Drowned Girl)
3. Marterl: Hier ruht die Jungfrau Johanna Beck (memorial tablet)
4. (alternate to 3) Grabschrift 1919: Die rote Rosa schon lang verschwand (Epitaph 1919)
5. Erster Bericht über den unbekannten Soldaten: Wir kamen von den Gebirgen (First Report on the Unknown Soldier)
6. Zweiter Bericht über den unbekannten Soldaten: Alles, was ich euch sagte (Second Report on the Unknown Soldier)
7. Zu Potsdam unter den Eichen (To Potsdam under the Oak Trees)

Source: AllMusic
