= Black Lotus Records =

Black Lotus Records was an independent record label based in Greece that specialized in metal. After acquiring licenses for several new artists, Black Lotus Records has filed for bankruptcy, resulting in an indefinite hold on all announced titles.

== See also ==
- List of record labels
